= String Quartet No. 6 (Villa-Lobos) =

1938 work by Heitor Villa-Lobos

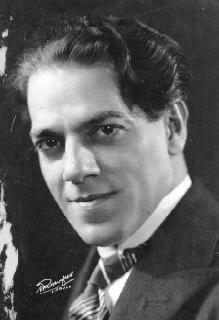
Heitor Villa-Lobos

String Quartet No. 6 ("Brazilian") is one of 17 works in the genre by the Brazilian composer Heitor Villa-Lobos, and was written in 1938, in between his early and late periods. Villa-Lobos considered naming it "Quartet Popular No. 2" as opposed to "Brazilian," and while the work is indeed one of his more nationalist pieces, it also bears direct connections to the Viennese tradition of string quartet composition.

A typical performance lasts approximately 24 minutes.

== History ==
Villa-Lobos composed his Sixth Quartet in 1938 in Rio de Janeiro, where it was first performed by the Quarteto Haydn on 30 November 1943, on the same programme as the premiere of the Seventh Quartet. The published score bears no dedication, but the manuscript is dedicated to the violist Orlando Frederico, who many years earlier had participated in the premieres of both the Second and Third Quartets.

The composition of this quartet followed his time spent living in Paris (1923–1930). It is with this quartet that the references to the quartets of Haydn, which continue throughout the composer's later quartets, become clear for the first time. While in Paris, Villa-Lobos was immersed in the Parisian and broader European musical traditions of the day.

However, while there are Haydnesque and also Beethovenian influences that appear in this quartet, it is an oversimplification to conclude that his time living in Paris and closer connection with the music of these composers brought changes to his compositional style. Villa-Lobos himself remained adamant that his works were entirely his own; he believed firmly in the superiority of his work and took pride in his independence from the European tradition. Indeed, the Sixth Quartet is regarded as the most nationalistic of all Villa-Lobos's string quartets. This work, along with the Fifth Quartet, is marked by a deliberate move toward a more "popular" style, incorporating elements of Brazilian popular music. Villa-Lobos originally planned to designate this work as the second "popular quartet" (the Fifth Quartet is subtitled "Quarteto popular no. 1"), but in the end abandoned the idea of such a series.

== Analysis ==
This composition, like all of Villa-Lobos's quartets except the first, consists of four movements:

1. Poco animato
2. Allegretto
3. Andante, quasi adagio
4. Allegro vivace

Instead of the usual sonata-allegro form, the first movement presents a sectional structure. Four contrasting sections (with transitions between the first and second, and between the third and fourth) are followed by a recapitulation of the first section, and an extended coda. There is no development section. In keeping with the references to Brazilian popular music, Villa-Lobos begins with a shorter motive that he then expands in length and by increasing the variety in the rhythmic syncopations, which alludes to the Brazilian popular music after which Villa-Lobos titles the quartet.

The second movement is in a three-part, ABA song form in the character of the Brazilian improvised serenade known as the choro. The A section is homophonic, while the central B section features imitative textures and a xangô-like theme in common time held by the cello, set against a syncopated accompaniment of continuous pizzicato quarter-note triplets in the upper three voices.

The third movement is also in ternary form, but with a variation. The A section falls into two parts, which are reversed in order when A is recapitulated after the central B section. The tonal language and textural features (such as rhythmic combination, doubling, portamento, and open fifths) of the outer sections resemble those of the Bachianas Brasileiras, especially parts of the first movement of Bachianas No. 5. The middle section features a fugato on a subject related to the cantilena (xangô) motive from the second movement. This passage is the first occurrence of the atonal, chromatic, legato style found often in Villa-Lobos's subsequent quartets

The finale is similar in structure to the first movement, consisting of three successive, contrasting sections and a recapitulation of the first, concluding with a short coda. Unlike the first movement, however (and unlike all of the composer's earlier quartets), there is a certain thematic kinship amongst the sections, with a recurrence of a falling-third figure and the use of pseudo-Indian motifs influenced by Antonín Dvořák's "American" Quartet

== Discography ==
Chronological by date of recording.

- Heitor Villa-Lobos: Quartet no. 6 in E (Quartetto brasileiro no. 2). Stuyvesant String Quartet (Sylvan Shulman, Bernard Robbins, violins; Ralph Hersh, viola; Alan Shulman, cello). Recorded at the Majestic Theatre, New York City, 7 May 1947. Standard groove, 3 discs: 12 in., 78 rpm, monaural. International Records 301. International Master Series. New York: International Records, [1947]. Reissued on LP, 1 disc: 12 33⅓ rpm, monaural. Concert Hall CHC-19. New York, N.Y.: Concert Hall, 1949. Reissued on CD with quartets by Paul Hindemith and Quincy Porter. Parnassus PACD 96026. Woodstock, NY: Parnassus Records, 2000.
- William Walton: String Quartet in A Minor; Heitor Villa-Lobos: String Quartet No. 6. Hollywood String Quartet (Felix Slatkin, Paul Shure, violins; Paul Robyn, viola; Eleanor Aller [Slatkin], cello). Recorded between 1951 and 1953. LP recording, 1 disc: analog, 33⅓ rpm, monaural, 12 in. Record Society 6010. Melbourne: Record Society, [195?]. Villa-Lobos also issued as part of:
  - Heitor Villa-Lobos: String Quartet No. 6; Zoltán Kodály: String Quartet No. 2, Op. 10. Hollywood String Quartet. LP recording, 1 disc: analog, 33⅓ rpm, monaural, 12 in. Capitol P 8472. Hollywood: Capitol Records, 1959.
- Radamés Gnatalli: Quarteto popular; César Guerra-Peixe: Quartet No. 2; Alceo Bocchino: Seresta suburbana; Heitor Villa-Lobos - Quarteto nº 6. Quarteto Brasileiro da UFRJ (Santino Parpinelli and Henrique Morelenbaum, violins; Jacques Nirenberg, viola; Eugen Ranevsky, cello). LP recording.
  - Reissued on CD, CID 02027. 1999.
  - Reissued on CD, Albany TROY 420. [S.l.]: Albany Records, 2001.
  - Villa-Lobos quartet (only) reissued as part of Heitor Villa-Lobos: String Quartets nos. 1, 6, and 17. Quarteto Brasileiro da UFRJ. CD recording, 1 sound disc: digital, 12 cm, stereo. [S.l.]: Albany Records, 2005.
- Hollywood String Quartet. Maurice Ravel: Introduction and Allegro; Claude Debussy: Danse sacrée et danse profane; Joaquín Turina: La oración del torero, Op. 34; Villa-Lobos: String Quartet No. 6; Paul Creston: String Quartet, Op. 8. Ann Mason Stockton, harp (Ravel and Debussy); Arthur Gleghorn, flute (Ravel); Mitchell Lurie, clarinet (Ravel); Concert Arts Strings, Felix Slatkin, conductor (Debussy); Hollywood String Quartet. CD recording, 1 disc: 12 cm, monaural. [England]: Testament, 1994.
- Heitor Villa-Lobos: String Quartets Nos. 4, 6 and 14. Danubius Quartet (Judit Tóth and Adél Miklós, violins; Cecilia Bodolai, viola; Ilona Wibli, cello). Recorded at the Hungaroton Studios in Budapest, 18–19, 22–25 April, and 20–23 May 1991. CD recording, 1 disc: digital, 12 cm, stereo. Marco Polo 8.223391. A co-production with Records International. Germany: HH International, Ltd., 1992.
- Villa-Lobos: String Quartets, Volume 1. Quartets Nos. 6, 1, 17. Cuarteto Latinoamericano (Saúl Bitrán, Arón Bitrán, violins; Javier Montiel, viola; Alvaro Bitrán, cello). Recorded at the Troy Savings Bank Music Hall in Troy, NY, April 1994. Music of Latin American Masters. CD recording, 1 disc: digital, 12 cm, stereo. Dorian DOR-90205. Troy, NY: Dorian Recordings, 1995.
  - Reissued as part of Heitor Villa-Lobos: The Complete String Quartets. 6 CDs + 1 DVD with a performance of Quartet No. 1 and interview with the Cuarteto Latinoamericano. Dorian Sono Luminus. DSL-90904. Winchester, VA: Sono Luminus, 2009.
  - Also reissued (without the DVD) on Brilliant Classics 6634.
- Villa-Lobos: Quatuors a Cordes Nos. 4/5/6. Quatuor Bessler-Reis (Bernardo Bessler, Michel Bessler, violins; Marie-Christine Springuel, viola; Alceu Reis, cello). Recorded at Studios Master in Rio de Janeiro, June–August 1987. CD recording, 1 disc: digital, 12 cm, stereo. Le Chant du Monde LDC 278 901. France: [S.n.], 1988.
  - Also issued as part of Villa-Lobos: Os 17 quartetos de cordas / The 17 String Quartets. Quarteto Bessler-Reis and Quarteto Amazônia. CD recording, 6 sound discs: digital, 12 cm, stereo. Kuarup Discos KCX-1001 (KCD 045, M-KCD-034, KCD 080/1, KCD-051, KCD 042). Rio de Janeiro: Kuarup Discos, 1996.

== Filmography ==
- Villa-Lobos: A integral dos quartetos de cordas. Quarteto Radamés Gnattali (Carla Rincón, Francisco Roa, violins; Fernando Thebaldi, viola; Hugo Pilger, cello); presented by Turibio Santos. Recorded from June 2010 to September 2011 at the Palácio do Catete, Palácio das Laranjeiras, and the Theatro Municipal, Rio de Janeiro. DVD and Blu-ray (VIBD11111), 3 discs. Rio de Janeiro: Visom Digital, 2012.
