= 1915 in music =

This is a list of notable events in music that took place in the year 1915.

== Specific locations ==
- 1915 in British music
- 1915 in Norwegian music

== Specific genres ==
- 1915 in jazz

== Events ==
- March–December – The ukulele becomes popular as a result of its appearance in the Hawaiian Pavilion at the Panama–Pacific International Exposition in San Francisco.
- May 15 – Tom Brown's band from New Orleans begin performing in Chicago, Illinois and start advertising themselves as a "Jass Band".
- May 23 – Japanese composer Kōsaku Yamada conducts the premiere of his Overture in D major at the Imperial Theatre in Tokyo, performed by the Tokyo Philharmonic Society.
- April 21 – Sibelius sees sixteen swans over Lake Tuusula which immediately inspires him to write the theme that becomes the finalé to his Symphony No. 5.
- Summer – Claude Debussy composes at Pourville on the French Channel coast.
- October 28 – Richard Strauss's symphonic poem An Alpine Symphony (Eine Alpensinfonie) is premiered by the orchestra of the Dresden Hofkapelle in Berlin under the composer's baton.
- November 13 – First concert devoted to the work of Brazilian composer Heitor Villa-Lobos.
- December 8 – Jean Sibelius conducts the world première of his Symphony No. 5 in Helsinki at a birthday concert for him.
- December – Claude Debussy becomes one of the first people to receive a colostomy.
- Composer Alban Berg enters service with the Austro-Hungarian Army.
- Composer Herbert Howells is given six months to live, and becomes the first person in the UK to receive radium treatment (he will live on until 1983).
- William Penfro Rowlands's hymn tune "Blaenwern" is first published in Henry H. Jones' Cân a Moliant.
- Marie and Edward M. Zimmerman's suffrage anthem "Votes for Woman, Suffrage Rallying Song" is published.

== Published popular music ==
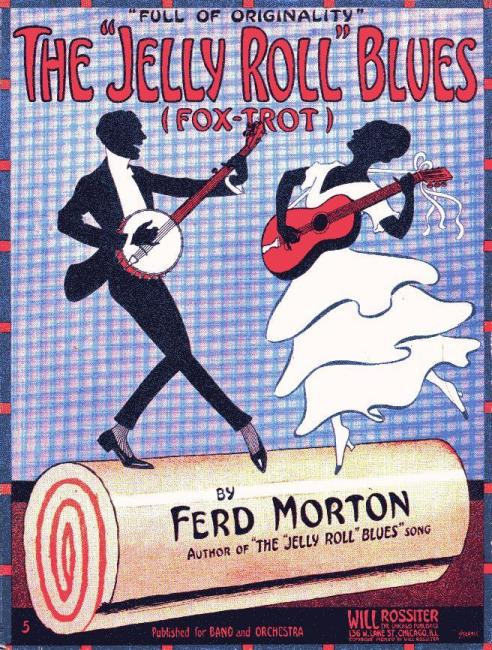
"The Jelly Roll Blues" by Jelly Roll Morton

- "Agitation Rag" by Robert Hampton
- "Alabama Jubilee" w.m. Jack Yellen & George L. Cobb
- "All For You" w. Henry Blossom m. Victor Herbert
- "Along The Rocky Road To Dublin" w. Joe Young m. Bert Grant
- "America, I Love You" w. Edgar Leslie m. Archie Gottler
- "Araby" w.m. Irving Berlin
- "Are You From Dixie?" w.m. Jack Yellen & George L. Cobb
- "Are You The O'Reilly? (Blime Me, O' Reilly, You Are Lookin' Well)" Rooney, Emmett
- "Auf Wiedersehen" w. Herbert Reynolds m. Sigmund Romberg, from the musical The Blue Paradise
- "Babes In The Wood" w. Schuyler Greene & Jerome Kern m. Jerome Kern
- "Baby Shoes" w. Joe Goodwin & Ed Rose m. Al Piantadosi
- "Beatrice Fairfax, Tell Me What To Do" w.m. Grant Clarke, Joseph McCarthy, & James V. Monaco
- "Belgium Put the Kibosh on the Kaiser" w.m. Mark Sheridan
- "Blame It On The Blues" Doc Cooke
- "Canadian Capers" w. Earl Burnett m. Gus Chandler, Bert White & Henry Cohan
- "Close To My Heart" by Andrew B. Sterling
- "Dear Old-Fashioned Irish Songs, My Mother Sang To Me" Bryan, Von Tilzer
- "Don't Take My Darling Boy Away" w. Will Dillon m. Albert Von Tilzer
- "Down In Bom-Bombay" w. Ballard MacDonald m. Harry Carroll
- "Everything In America Is Ragtime" w.m. Irving Berlin
- "Fascination" w.m. Harold Atteridge & Sigmund Romberg
- "The Girl On The Magazine Cover" w.m. Irving Berlin
- "Hello Frisco!" w. Gene Buck m. Louis A. Hirsch
- "Hello, Hawaii, How Are You?" w. Bert Kalmar & Edgar Leslie m. Jean Schwartz
- "The Hesitating Blues" w.m. W. C. Handy
- "I Can Beat You Doing What You're Doing Me" w.m. Clarence Williams & Armand J. Piron
- "I Didn't Raise My Boy To Be A Soldier" w. Alfred Bryan m. Al Piantadosi
- "I Love a Piano" w.m. Irving Berlin
- "I Wish I Was An Island In An Ocean Of Girls" w. Henry Blossom m. Victor Herbert
- "I'd Rather Be A Lamp-Post On Old Broadway" Benjamin Hapgood Burt
- "If I Can't Sing The Words, You Must Whistle The Tune" Herman Darewski
- "If We Can't Be The Same Old Sweethearts" w. Joe McCarthy m. James V. Monaco
- "I'm Simply Crazy Over You" w. William Jerome & E. Ray Goetz m. Jean Schwartz
- "In a Monastery Garden" m. Albert William Ketèlbey
- "Ireland Is Ireland To Me" w. Fiske O'Hara & J. Keirn Brennan m. Ernest R. Ball
- "It's Tulip Time In Holland" w. Dave Radford m. Richard A. Whiting
- "I've Been Floating Down the Old Green River" w. Bert Kalmar m. Joe Cooper
- "I've Gotta Go Back To Texas" Irving Berlin
- "Just Try To Picture Me (Back Home In Tennessee)" w. William Jerome m. Walter Donaldson
- "Keep the Home Fires Burning" w. Lena Guilbert Ford m. Ivor Novello (2nd edition, first under this title)
- "The Ladder Of Roses" w. R. H. Burnside m. Raymond Hubbell
- "The Little House Upon The Hill" w. Ballard MacDonald & Joe Goodwin m. Harry Puck
- "Love Is The Best Of All" w. Henry Blossom m. Victor Herbert
- "Love, Here Is My Heart" w. Adrian Ross m. Lãu Silésu
- "The Magic Melody" w. Schuyler Greene m. Jerome Kern
- "Memories" w. Gustave Kahn m. Egbert Van Alstyne
- "M-O-T-H-E-R" w. Howard Johnson m. Theodore F. Morse
- "My Little Girl" w. Sam M. Lewis & William Dillon m. Albert Von Tilzer
- "My Mother's Rosary" w. Sam M. Lewis m. George W. Meyer
- "My Sweet Adair" w.m. L. Wolfe Gilbert & Anatole Friedland
- "Neapolitan Love Song" w. Henry Blossom Jr m. Victor Herbert
- "Nola" m. Felix Arndt
- "Norway" by Joe McCarthy
- "On The Beach At Waikiki" w. G. H. Stover m. Henry Kailimai
- "Pack Up Your Troubles in Your Old Kit-Bag" w. George Asaf m. Felix Powell
- "Paper Doll" w.m. Johnny S. Black
- "The Perfect Song" w. Clarence Lucas m. Joseph Carl Breil
- "Please Keep Out Of My Dreams" w.m. Elsa Maxwell
- "Ragging The Scale" w. Dave Ringle m. Edward B. Claypole
- "Ragtime Pipe of Pan" w. Harold J. Atteridge m. Sigmund Romberg from the revue A World of Pleasure
- "Railroad Jim" by Nat H. Vincent
- "Ritual Fire Dance" m. Manuel de Falla
- "She's The Daughter Of Mother Machree" w. Jeff T. Branen m. Ernest R. Ball
- "Siam" w. Howard Johnson m. Fred Fisher
- "Some Little Bug Is Going To Find You" w. Benjamin Hapgood Burt & Roy Atwell m. Silvio Hein. Introduced by Roy Atwell in the musical Alone at Last.
- "Some Sort Of Somebody" w. Elsie Janis m. Jerome Kern
- "Song Of The Islands" w.m. Charles E. King
- "That Hula Hula" w.m. Irving Berlin
- "There Must Be Little Cupids in The Briny" Jack Foley
- "There's a Broken Heart For Every Light On Broadway" w. Howard Johnson m. Fred Fisher
- "There's a Little Lane Without A Turning On The Way To Home Sweet Home" w. Sam M. Lewis m. George W. Meyer
- "Underneath the Stars" w. Fleta Jan Brown m. Herbert Spencer
- "We'll Have a Jubilee in My Old Kentucky Home" w. Coleman Goetz m. Walter Donaldson
- "Weary Blues" m. Artie Matthews
- "When I Get Back to the USA" w.m. Irving Berlin
- "When I Leave the World Behind" w.m. Irving Berlin
- "When You're in Love with Someone" w.m. Grant Clarke & Al Piantadosi
- "You Can't Mend a Broken Heart" by Shelton Brooks
- "You Know And I Know" w. Schuyler Greene m. Jerome Kern
- "You'll Always Be the Same Sweet Girl" w. Andrew B. Sterling m. Harry Von Tilzer

== Hit recordings ==
- "Carry Me Back to Old Virginny" by Alma Gluck
- "It's a Long Way to Tipperary" by John McCormack
- "I Didn't Raise My Boy to be a Soldier" by Morton Harvey
- "Keep the Home Fires Burning" by James F. Harrison

== Classical music ==
- Béla Bartók
  - Romanian Folk Dances
  - Sonatina
- Alban Berg – Three Pieces for Orchestra (Drei Orchesterstücke; first performed 1923/30)
- Frank Bridge
  - Novelletten, H.44 (first published, composed 1904)
  - String Quartet No.2, H.115
  - Lament, H.117
- Harry Thacker Burleigh
  - 5 Songs of Laurence Hope
  - Ethiopia Saluting the Colors
- John Alden Carpenter
  - Adventures in a Perambulator (first performed)
  - Concertino for piano and orchestra
  - Impromptu for piano
  - Polonaise Américaine for piano
- Claude Debussy
  - En blanc et noir for two pianos
  - Études for solo piano (two books of 6)
  - Sonata for cello and piano in D minor
  - Sonata for flute, viola and harp (first performed 1916)
- George Enescu – Orchestral Suite No. 2 in C major, Op. 20
- Edward Elgar – Polonia, op.76 (Overture)
- Manuel de Falla
  - El amor brujo (gitanería version for cante flamenco, actors and chamber orchestra)
  - Nights in the Gardens of Spain (Noches en los jardines de España; first performed 1916)
- Enrique Granados – 2 Danzas Españolas, Op.37
- Jesús Guridi – Así cantan los chicos
- Charles Ives
  - Piano Sonata No. 2, Concord, Mass., 1840–60 (first published 1919)
  - String Quartet No. 2 (first performed 1946)
- Zoltán Kodály – Sonata for Solo Cello, Op. 8
- Egon Kornauth – Phantasie Op.10
- Federico Mompou – L'Hora Gris ("Grey Hour")
- Manuel Ponce – Balada Mexicana
- Sergei Prokofiev – Scythian Suite (first performed 1916)
- Sergei Rachmaninoff – All-Night Vigil (Всенощное бдѣніе, Vsénoshchnoye bdéniye)
- Max Reger
  - Variationen und Fuge über ein Thema von Beethoven, Op. 86
  - 3 Cello Suites, Op. 131c
  - 3 Viola Suites, Op. 131d
  - Violin Sonata No.9, Op.139
  - String Trio No. 2 in D minor, Op. 141b
  - Requiem, Op. 144b
- Camille Saint-Saëns – Cavatine, Op. 144
- Jean Sibelius
  - Impromptu, Op. 78
  - Jäger March (Jääkärien marssi), Op. 91a, for male chorus and symphony orchestra
  - Symphony No. 5 in E-flat major, Op. 82
- Charles Villiers Stanford – Piano Concerto No.2, Op.126, premiered June 3 in Norfolk, Connecticut
- Wilhelm Stenhammar – Symphony No. 2 in G minor
- Richard Strauss – An Alpine Symphony
- Karol Szymanowski
  - Métopes, for piano
  - Mythes, for violin and piano
  - Songs of a Fairy-Tale Princess, for voice and piano
  - 3 Songs on Words by Dmitri Davydov, for voice and piano
- Gabriel Verdalle – Impromptu No.2
- Heitor Villa-Lobos
  - Cello Concerto no. 1
  - Danças Características Africanas for piano
  - Desesperança – Sonata Phantastica e Capricciosa No. 1 for violin and piano
  - Elégie for orchestra
  - Suíte graciosa (revised in 1946 as String Quartet No. 1)
  - String Quartet No. 2
  - Trio for piano and strings No. 2
- Siegfried Wagner – Violin Concerto
- Heinrich Weinreis – Es kommt ein Schiff, geladen
- Géza Zichy – Liebestraum

== Opera ==
- Rutland Boughton – Bethlehem
- Umberto Giordano – Madame Sans-Gene
- Emmerich Kálmán – Die Csárdásfürstin premiered November 17 in Vienna

== Musical theater ==
- Alone at Last Broadway production opened at the Shubert Theatre on October 14 and ran for 180 performances
- Betty London production opened at Daly's Theatre on April 24 and ran for 391 performances
- The Blue Paradise Broadway production opened at the Casino Theatre on August 5 and ran for 356 performances.
- Bric-A-Brac London production opened at the Palace Theatre on September 18.
- 5064 Gerrard London revue opened at the Alhambra Theatre on March 19.
- Hip-Hip-Hooray Broadway revue opened at the Hippodrome Theatre on September 30 and ran for 425 performances.
- Maid in America Broadway production opened at the Winter Garden Theatre on February 18 and ran for 108 performances.
- The Only Girl London production opened at the Apollo Theatre on September 25 and ran for 107 performances.
- The Passing Show Of 1915 Broadway revue opened at the Winter Garden Theatre on May 29 and ran for 145 performances.
- Shell Out London production opened at the Comedy Theatre on August 24 and ran for 315 performances.
- Stop! Look! Listen! Broadway production opened at the Globe Theatre on December 25 and ran for 105 performances.
- Tonight's The Night London production opened at the Gaiety Theatre on April 18 and ran for 460 performances.
- Very Good Eddie Broadway production opened at the Princess Theatre on December 23 and ran for 341 performances
- A World of Pleasure Broadway revue opened at the Winter Garden Theatre on October 14 and ran for 116 performances.
- Ziegfeld Follies Of 1915 Broadway revue opened at the New Amsterdam Theatre on June 21 and ran for 104 performances

== Births ==
- January 1 – Fulgencio Aquino, Venezuelan harpist and composer (d. 1994)
- January 6 – Bob Copper, English folk singer (d. 2004)
- January 25 – Ewan MacColl, English folk singer and songwriter (d. 1989)
- January 27 – Jack Brymer, English clarinettist (d. 2003)
- January 29 – John Serry, Sr., US concert accordionist, composer & arranger (d. 2003)
- January 30 – Dorothy Dell, actress and singer (d. 1934)
- January 31 – Alan Lomax, US folklorist and musicologist (d. 2002)
- February 4 – Ray Evans, US songwriter (d. 2007)
- February 18 – Marcel Landowski, French composer, biographer and arts administrator (d. 1999)
- March 4 – Carlos Surinach, Spanish composer (d. 1997)
- March 10 – Charles Groves, English conductor (d. 1992)
- March 14 – Alexander Brott, Canadian conductor and composer (d. 2005)
- March 20
  - Sviatoslav Richter, pianist (d. 1997)
  - Sister Rosetta Tharpe, gospel singer (d. 1973)
- March 25 – Dorothy Squires, Welsh singer (d. 1998)
- March 27 – Robert Lockwood, Jr., US Delta blues guitarist (d. 2006)
- March 28 – Jay Livingston, songwriter (d. 2001)
- March 29 – George Chisholm, Scottish-born jazz trombonist and comedian (d. 1997)
- April 4 – Muddy Waters (born McKinley Morganfield), African American blues musician (d. 1983)
- April 7 – Billie Holiday (born Eleanora Fagan), African American blues singer (d. 1959)
- April 12 – Hound Dog Taylor, African American blues guitarist (d. 1975)
- April 29 – Donald Mills, US singer of the Mills Brothers (d. 1999)
- May 5 – Alice Faye, US actress and singer (d. 1998)
- May 8 – Nan Wynn, US singer (d. 1971)
- May 25 – Ginny Simms, US singer (d. 1994)
- May 27
  - Esther Soré, Chilean musician (d. 1996)
  - Midge Williams, African American jazz singer (d. 1952)
- June 1 – Bart Howard, composer and pianist (d. 2004)
- June 9 – Les Paul, US musician, inventor of the solid body electric guitar (d. 2009)
- June 12 – Priscilla Lane, US singer and actress (d. 1995)
- June 17 – David "Stringbean" Akeman, US country musician (d. 1973)
- June 18 – Vic Legley, Dutch composer (d. 1994)
- June 19 – Mária Gyurkovics, Hungarian soprano (d. 1973)
- June 22 – Randolph Henning Hokanson, pianist (died 2018)
- June 28 – David Honeyboy Edwards, US blues musician (d. 2011)
- July 1 – Willie Dixon, US blues musician (d. 1992)
- July 9 – David Diamond, classical composer (d. 2005)
- July 15 – Frankie Yankovic, polka musician (d. 1998)
- July 22 – Armando Renzi (it), composer (died 1985)
- July 23 – Emmett Berry, jazz trumpeter (d. 1993)
- July 28 – Frankie Yankovic, accordionist and polka musician (d. 1998)
- July 31 – George Forrest, musical theatre writer (d. 1999)
- August 6 – Jacques Abram, American pianist (d. 1998)
- August 9 – Haim Alexander, Israeli composer (d. 2012)
- August 24 – Wynonie Harris, American singer (d. 1969)
- August 25 – Walter Trampler, German-born American violist (d. 1997)
- August 26 – Humphrey Searle, English composer (d. 1982)
- August 30 – Robert Strassburg, American classical composer (d. 2003)
- September 3
  - Knut Nystedt, Norwegian classical composer (d. 2014)
  - Memphis Slim (born John Chatman), African American blues musician (d. 1988)
- September 5 – Florencio Morales Ramos, singer, trovador and composer (d. 1989)
- September 12 – Billy Daniels, US singer (d. 1988)
- September 23 – Julius Baker, flautist (d. 2003)
- September 24 – Ettore Gracis, conductor (d. 1992)
- October 10 – Sweets Edison, American jazz trumpeter (d. 1999)
- October 12 – José Bragato, Italian-born Argentine cellist, composer, conductor and arranger (d. 2017)
- October 31 – Jane Jarvis, American jazz pianist and composer (d. 2010)
- November 2 – Kay Armen, American singer (d. 2011)
- November 5 – Myron Floren, American accordionist (d. 2005)
- November 9 – Hanka Bielicka, Polish singer and actress (d. 2006)
- November 14 – Billy Bauer, American cool jazz guitarist (d. 2005)
- November 26 – Earl Wild, American pianist (d. 2010)
- November 29 – Billy Strayhorn, American jazz composer, pianist, arranger, lyricist and collaborator with Duke Ellington (d. 1967)
- November 30 – Brownie McGhee, American Piedmont blues musician (d. 1996)
- December 12 – Frank Sinatra, US singer and actor (d. 1998)
- December 14 – Dan Dailey, US singer and actor (d. 1978)
- December 16 – Georgy Sviridov, Russian/Soviet composer (d. 1998)
- December 17 – André Claveau, singer (d. 2003)
- December 19 – Édith Piaf, French singer (d. 1963)
- December 25 – Pete Rugolo, Italian-born US pianist and bandleader (d 2011)

== Deaths ==
- January 2
  - Karl Goldmark, Hungarian composer (b. 1830)
  - Bertha Tammelin, Swedish mezzo-soprano singer and actress (b. 1836)
- January 5 – Jeanne Gerville-Réache, French operatic contralto (b. 1882)
- January 21 – Louis Gregh, French composer and publisher (b. 1843)
- January 22 – Anna Bartlett Warner, songwriter (b. 1827)
- January 25 – Rudolf Tillmetz, flute virtuoso, pedagogue and composer (b. 1847)
- February 5 – Paul Collin, translator and lyricist (born 1843)
- February 12
  - Fanny Crosby, hymn-writer (b. 1820)
  - Emile Waldteufel, composer (b. 1837)
- March 12 – Heinrich Schülz-Beuthen, composer (b. 1838)
- March 19 – Franz Xaver Neruda, cellist and composer (b. 1843)
- April 27 – Alexander Scriabin, composer (b. 1872) (sepsis)
- May 7 – Charles Frohman, Broadway producer (b. 1856) (drowned in sinking of the RMS Lusitania)
- June 2 – Botho Sigwart, composer (born 1884)
- June 9 – Enrico Rocca, violin maker (b. 1847)
- June 10 – William Hayman Cummings, organist and singer (b. 1831)
- June 19 – Sergei Taneyev, pianist and composer (b. 1856)
- June 25 – Rafael Joseffy, pianist and composer (b. 1852)
- June 30 – Billy Kersands, African American dancer (b. c. 1842)
- September 15 – Isidor Bajić, composer (b. 1878)
- September 29 – Rudi Stephan, composer (b. 1887) (killed in action)
- October 2 – Russell Alexander, entertainer and composer (b. 1877)
- October 5
  - Otto Malling, organist and composer (b. 1848)
  - José María Usandizaga, Spanish Basque composer (b. 1887) (tuberculosis)
- October 22 – Adèle Isaac, operatic soprano (b. 1854)
- October 26 – August Bungert, German composer and poet (b. 1845)
- November 12 – Jean-Charles Delioux, French composer (born 1825)
- November 14 – Teodor Leszetycki, pianist and composer (b. 1830)
- November 27 – Sigismund Zaremba, Russian composer (b. 1861)
- c. December 1 – Henry Hart, African American entertainer and composer (b. 1839)
- December 3 – Lewis F. Muir, American composer of ragtime (born 1883)
- December 4 – Gustav Hollaender, German composer (b. 1855)
- December 10 – David Jenkins, Welsh choral composer (b. 1848)
