= String Quartet No. 4 (Villa-Lobos) =

Composition by Heitor Villa-Lobos

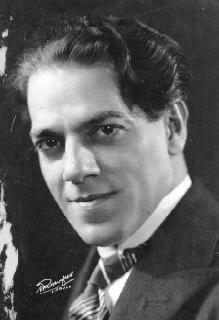
Heitor Villa-Lobos

String Quartet No. 4 is the fourth of 17 works in the genre by the Brazilian composer Heitor Villa-Lobos. Villa-Lobos composed his Fourth Quartet in 1917, in Rio de Janeiro, but the work remained unperformed until 1949, at which time the composer revised the score. This version was premiered by the Borgerth String Quartet (also known as the Carioca Quartet) on 8 October 1949 in Rio de Janeiro. The score is dedicated to Frederico Nascimento Filho.

A typical performance lasts approximately 23 minutes.

== Analysis ==
The quartet consists of four movements:

1. Allegro con moto
2. Andantino (tranquillo)
3. Scherzo (Allegro vivace)
4. Allegro

The Fourth Quartet marks the end of Villa-Lobos's early period of exploration of the form. It is somewhat simpler than its three predecessors, and the parts move more independently and expressively. The main theme of the first movement strongly recalls the opening measures of the First and Second Quartets, but the second movement introduces a Brazilian character with a cello melody that avoids the second scale degree, like the Afro-Brazilian Xangô tunes.

== Discography ==
In order of dates of recording.

- Villa-Lobos: Quatuors a Cordes Nos. 4/5/6. Quatuor Bessler-Reis (Bernardo Bessler, Michel Bessler, violins; Marie-Christine Springuel, viola; Alceu Reis, cello). Recorded at Studios Master in Rio de Janeiro, June–August 1987. CD recording, 1 disc: digital, 12 cm, stereo. Le Chant du Monde LDC 278 901. France: [S.n.], 1988.
  - Also issued as part of Villa-Lobos: Os 17 quartetos de cordas / The 17 String Quartets. Quarteto Bessler-Reis and Quarteto Amazônia. CD recording, 6 sound discs: digital, 12 cm, stereo. Kuarup Discos KCX-1001 (KCD 045, M-KCD-034, KCD 080/1, KCD-051, KCD 042). Rio de Janeiro: Kuarup Discos, 1996.
- Heitor Villa-Lobos: String Quartets Nos. 4, 6 and 14. Danubius Quartet (Judit Tóth and Adél Miklós, violins; Cecilia Bodolai, viola; Ilona Wibli, cello). Recorded at the Hungaroton Studios in Budapest, 18–19, 22–25 April, and 20–23 May 1991. CD recording, 1 disc: digital, 12 cm, stereo. Marco Polo 8.223391. A co-production with Records International. Germany: HH International, Ltd., 1992.
- Villa-Lobos: String Quartets, Volume 6. Quartets Nos. 4, 9, 11. Cuarteto Latinoamericano (Saúl Bitrán, Arón Bitrán, violins; Javier Montiel, viola; Alvaro Bitrán, cello). Recorded at the Sala Blas Galindo of the Centro Nacional de las Artes in Mexico City, 31 July – 3 August 2000. Music of Latin American Masters. CD recording, 1 disc: digital, 12 cm, stereo. Dorian DOR-93229. Troy, NY: Dorian Recordings, 2001.
  - Reissued as part of Heitor Villa-Lobos: The Complete String Quartets. 6 CDs + 1 DVD with a performance of Quartet No. 1 and interview with the Cuarteto Latinoamericano. Dorian Sono Luminus. DSL-90904. Winchester, VA: Sono Luminus, 2009.
  - Also reissued (without the DVD) on Brilliant Classics 6634.

== Filmography ==
- Villa-Lobos: A integral dos quartetos de cordas. Quarteto Radamés Gnattali (Carla Rincón, Francisco Roa, violins; Fernando Thebaldi, viola; Hugo Pilger, cello); presented by Turibio Santos. Recorded from June 2010 to September 2011 at the Palácio do Catete, Palácio das Laranjeiras, and the Theatro Municipal, Rio de Janeiro. DVD and Blu-ray (VIBD11111), 3 discs. Rio de Janeiro: Visom Digital, 2012.
