= String Quartet No. 12 (Villa-Lobos) =

Villa-Lobos in June 1952

String Quartet No. 12 is the part of a series of seventeen works in the genre by the Brazilian composer Heitor Villa-Lobos. Villa-Lobos began composing the quartet in New York in 1950, during a stay in Memorial Hospital following kidney surgery, completing the score at the Hotel Weston on 15 September.

According to the catalogue published by the Museu Villa-Lobos, it was first performed by the Quarteto Haydn in the Auditório do MEC, Rio de Janeiro, on 3 November 1951. According to another authority, the first performance was given that same year by the São Paulo Quartet. The score is dedicated to Mindinha (Arminda Neves d'Almeida), the composer's companion for the last 23 years of his life.

A typical performance lasts approximately 22 minutes.

== Analysis ==
As in all of Villa-Lobos's string quartets except the first, there are the traditional four movements:

1. Allegro
2. Andante malinconico
3. Allegretto leggiero
4. Allegro ben ritmato

Departing from the traditional sonata-allegro form, Villa-Lobos casts the opening movement of this quartet in a simple ABA ternary form. Each section is 32 bars in length, subdivided into sixteen-, eight-, and four-bars segments, and this main body of the movement is followed by a 16-bar coda. An interesting detail of the manuscript score is that Villa-Lobos uses the Portuguese tempo marking Alegro, instead of the Italian spelling which is his normal habit. The middle, B section is marked meno, and is in the rhythm of a modinha. The composer's biographer, Eero Tarasti, regards this as a regression to Villa-Lobos's earlier, clumsier style of quartet writing, and finds the texture "considerably more complicated than in previous quartets and the sound lacks transparency". Juan José Gutiérrez, on the contrary, views the quartet as relatively simple and concise, marking the beginnings of a neoclassical concern with balance and symmetry of structure in the composer's late period.

Like the opening movement's central section, the second, slow movement has the character of a modinha. Like the first movement, it is also in an ABA ternary form, in this case preceded by a 32-bar introduction.

The third movement is a scherzo (explicitly marked as such in the manuscript, but not in the printed score). At rehearsal number 5, the cello introduces a quotation from Villa-Lobos's 1940 cantata Mandú-Çárárá, played in parallel fifths.

The finale is once again a ternary ABA form, with a 21-bar coda. The composer described one theme from this movement as being "à la Spanish".

== Discography ==
- Villa-Lobos: Quatuors a Cordes Nos. 12–13–14. Quatuor Bessler-Reis (Bernardo Bessler, Michel Bessler, violins; Marie-Christine Springuel, viola; Alceu Reis, cello). Recorded at Multi Studio in Rio de Janeiro, June–July 1991, and at Studio Master in Rio de Janeiro, July 1989. CD recording, 1 disc: digital, 12 cm, stereo. Le Chant du Monde LDC 278 1066. France: [S.n.], 1991.
  - Also issued as part of Villa-Lobos: Os 17 quartetos de cordas / The 17 String Quartets. Quarteto Bessler-Reis and Quarteto Amazônia. CD recording, 6 sound discs: digital, 12 cm, stereo. Kuarup Discos KCX-1001 (KCD 045, M-KCD-034, KCD 080/1, KCD-051, KCD 042). Rio de Janeiro: Kuarup Discos, 1996.
- Heitor Villa-Lobos: String Quartets Nos. 5, 9 and 12. Danubius Quartet (Gyöngyvér Oláh and Adél Miklós, violins; Cecilia Bodolai, viola; Ilona Ribli, cello). Recorded at the Rottenbiller Street Studio in Budapest from 18 to 23 May 1992. CD recording, 1 disc: digital, 12 cm, stereo. Marco Polo 8.223392. A co-production with Records International. Germany: HH International, Ltd., 1993.
- Villa-Lobos: String Quartets, Volume 4. Quartets Nos. 2, 12, 16. Cuarteto Latinoamericano (Saúl Bitrán, Arón Bitrán, violins; Javier Montiel, viola; Alvaro Bitrán, cello). Recorded at the Sala Blas Galindo of the Centro Nacional de las Artes in Mexico City, November and December 1998. Music of Latin American Masters. CD recording, 1 disc: digital, 12 cm, stereo. Dorian DOR-93179. Troy, NY: Dorian Recordings, 1998.
  - Reissued as part of Heitor Villa-Lobos: The Complete String Quartets. 6 CDs + 1 DVD with a performance of Quartet No. 1 and interview with the Cuarteto Latinoamericano. Dorian Sono Luminus. DSL-90904. Winchester, VA: Sono Luminus, 2009.
  - Also reissued (without the DVD) on Brilliant Classics 6634.

== Filmography ==
- Villa-Lobos: A integral dos quartetos de cordas. Quarteto Radamés Gnattali (Carla Rincón, Francisco Roa, violins; Fernando Thebaldi, viola; Hugo Pilger, cello); presented by Turibio Santos. Recorded from June 2010 to September 2011 at the Palácio do Catete, Palácio das Laranjeiras, and the Theatro Municipal, Rio de Janeiro. DVD and Blu-ray (VIBD11111), 3 discs. Rio de Janeiro: Visom Digital, 2012.
