= String Quartet No. 13 (Villa-Lobos) =

Brazilian composed work

Villa-Lobos in June 1952

String Quartet No. 13 is one of a series of seventeen works in the medium by the Brazilian composer Heitor Villa-Lobos.

According to the catalog published by the Museu Villa-Lobos, the Thirteenth Quartet was composed in New York, but details of the occasion of the first performance are unknown Another source says it was composed in Rio de Janeiro and first performed in 1953. Both sources agree the year of composition was 1951 and that the score is dedicated to the Quarteto Municipal de São Paulo.

A typical performance of it lasts approximately 20 minutes.

== Analysis ==
Like most of Villa-Lobos's works in the medium, the quartet consists of four movements:

1. Allegro non troppo
2. Scherzo (Vivace)
3. Adagio
4. Allegro vivace

All four movements of this quartet are in ternary form (ABA).

In the first movement, the return of the A section is restricted to its first half, the remainder being replaced with a ten-bar coda.

The second movement is a scherzo, concluding with a coda made from material taken from the central, B section.

The third, slow movement exhibits subtle features of modinha rhythms in 6/4 time. The main theme of this movement has been criticised as "exceptionally shapeless" (Tarasti 1995, p. 317).

The finale is very similar to the opening movement, and uses as its main theme a subject connected by its intervallic structure to that of the fugato that opens the first movement. Eero Tarasti finds this theme "surprisingly feeble" (Tarasti 1995, p. 317).

== Discography ==
Chronological, in order of dates of recording.

- Villa-Lobos: Quatuors a Cordes Nos. 12–13–14. Quatuor Bessler-Reis (Bernardo Bessler, Michel Bessler, violins; Marie-Christine Springuel, viola; Alceu Reis, cello). Recorded at Multi Studio in Rio de Janeiro, June–July 1991, and at Studio Master in Rio de Janeiro, July 1989. CD recording, 1 disc: digital, 12 cm, stereo. Le Chant du Monde LDC 278 1066. France: [S.n.], 1991.
  - Also issued as part of Villa-Lobos: Os 17 quartetos de cordas / The 17 String Quartets. Quarteto Bessler-Reis and Quarteto Amazônia. CD recording, 6 sound discs: digital, 12 cm, stereo. Kuarup Discos KCX-1001 (KCD 045, M-KCD-034, KCD 080/1, KCD-051, KCD 042). Rio de Janeiro: Kuarup Discos, 1996.
- Heitor Villa-Lobos: String Quartets Nos. 1, 8 and 13. Danubius Quartet (Judit Tóth and Adél Miklós, violins; Cecilia Bodolai, viola; Ilona Wibli, cello). Recorded at the Hungaroton Studios in Budapest, 10–19 October 1990. CD recording, 1 disc: digital, 12 cm, stereo. Marco Polo 8.223389. A co-production with Records International. Germany: HH International, Ltd., 1992.
- Villa-Lobos: String Quartets, Volume 5. Quartets Nos. 5, 10, 13. Cuarteto Latinoamericano (Saúl Bitrán, Arón Bitrán, violins; Javier Montiel, viola; Alvaro Bitrán, cello). Recorded at the Sala Blas Galindo of the Centro Nacional de las Artes in Mexico City, 24–28 January 2000. Music of Latin American Masters. CD recording, 1 disc: digital, 12 cm, stereo. Dorian DOR-93211. Troy, NY: Dorian Recordings, 2000.
  - Reissued as part of Heitor Villa-Lobos: The Complete String Quartets. 6 CDs + 1 DVD with a performance of Quartet No. 1 and interview with the Cuarteto Latinoamericano. Dorian Sono Luminus. DSL-90904. Winchester, VA: Sono Luminus, 2009.
  - Also reissued (without the DVD) on Brilliant Classics 6634.

== Filmography ==
- Villa-Lobos: A integral dos quartetos de cordas. Quarteto Radamés Gnattali (Carla Rincón, Francisco Roa, violins; Fernando Thebaldi, viola; Hugo Pilger, cello); presented by Turibio Santos. Recorded from June 2010 to September 2011 at the Palácio do Catete, Palácio das Laranjeiras, and the Theatro Municipal, Rio de Janeiro. DVD and Blu-ray (VIBD11111), 3 discs. Rio de Janeiro: Visom Digital, 2012.
