= String Quartet No. 14 (Villa-Lobos) =

Villa-Lobos in June 1952

String Quartet No. 14 is the one of a series of seventeen works in the medium by the Brazilian composer Heitor Villa-Lobos. Villa-Lobos composed this quartet in Rio de Janeiro in 1953 on a commission from the University of Michigan for the Stanley Quartet (Gilbert Ross and Emil Raab, violins; Robert Courte, viola; Oliver Edel, cello), to whom the score is dedicated.

The Stanley Quartet gave the first performance in Ann Arbor as part of the 69th concert of the University of Michigan School of Music's 1953–54 season on Tuesday, 9 March 1954. It was preceded on the programme by Haydn's Quartet in C Major, Op. 74, No. 1, and followed by Beethoven's Quartet in B♭ major, Op. 130.

A typical performance lasts approximately 17 minutes.

== Analysis ==
As with most of Villa-Lobos's quartets, there are four movements:

1. Allegro
2. Andante
3. Scherzo (Vivace)
4. Molto allegro

All four movements of this quartet are in ternary, ABA form.

The second movement is nostalgic in manner, opening with a sixteen-bar, desolate, chromatic, and atonal fugato. The central section is strongly contrasted, using a theme in a tonal, popular-music style.

== Discography ==
Chronological, by date of recording.

- Heitor Villa-Lobos: String Quartets Nos. 4, 6 and 14. Danubius Quartet (Judit Tóth and Adél Miklós, violins; Cecilia Bodolai, viola; Ilona Wibli, cello). Recorded at the Hungaroton Studios in Budapest, 18–19, 22–25 April, and 20–23 May 1991. CD recording, 1 disc: digital, 12 cm, stereo. Marco Polo 8.223391. A co-production with Records International. Germany: HH International, Ltd., 1992.
- Villa-Lobos: Quatuors a Cordes Nos. 12–13–14. Quatuor Bessler-Reis (Bernardo Bessler, Michel Bessler, violins; Marie-Christine Springuel, viola; Alceu Reis, cello). Recorded at Multi Studio in Rio de Janeiro, June–July 1991, and at Studio Master in Rio de Janeiro, July 1989. CD recording, 1 disc: digital, 12 cm, stereo. Le Chant du Monde LDC 278 1066. France: [S.n.], 1991.
  - Also issued as part of Villa-Lobos: Os 17 quartetos de cordas / The 17 String Quartets. Quarteto Bessler-Reis and Quarteto Amazônia. CD recording, 6 sound discs: digital, 12 cm, stereo. Kuarup Discos KCX-1001 (KCD 045, M-KCD-034, KCD 080/1, KCD-051, KCD 042). Rio de Janeiro: Kuarup Discos, 1996.
- Villa-Lobos: String Quartets, Volume 2. Quartets Nos. 3, 8, 14. Cuarteto Latinoamericano (Saúl Bitrán, Arón Bitrán, violins; Javier Montiel, viola; Alvaro Bitrán, cello). Recorded at the Troy Savings Bank Music Hall in Troy, NY, March 1995. Music of Latin American Masters. CD recording, 1 disc: digital, 12 cm, stereo. Dorian DOR-90220. Troy, NY: Dorian Recordings, 1996.
  - Reissued as part of Heitor Villa-Lobos: The Complete String Quartets. 6 CDs + 1 DVD with a performance of Quartet No. 1 and interview with the Cuarteto Latinoamericano. Dorian Sono Luminus. DSL-90904. Winchester, VA: Sono Luminus, 2009.
  - Also reissued (without the DVD) on Brilliant Classics 6634.

== Filmography ==
- Villa-Lobos: A integral dos quartetos de cordas. Quarteto Radamés Gnattali (Carla Rincón, Francisco Roa, violins; Fernando Thebaldi, viola; Hugo Pilger, cello); presented by Turibio Santos. Recorded from June 2010 to September 2011 at the Palácio do Catete, Palácio das Laranjeiras, and the Theatro Municipal, Rio de Janeiro. DVD and Blu-ray (VIBD11111), 3 discs. Rio de Janeiro: Visom Digital, 2012.
