= String Quartet No. 15 (Villa-Lobos) =

Villa-Lobos in June 1952

String Quartet No. 15 is one of a series of seventeen works in the medium by the Brazilian composer Heitor Villa-Lobos. Villa-Lobos composed his Fifteenth Quartet in 1954, working on it at the Tamanaco Hotel in Caracas and completing the score in New York.

It was first performed by the Juilliard String Quartet (Robert Mann and Isidore Cohen, violins; Raphael Hillyer, viola; Claus Adam, cello) on 19 April 1958 in the Coolidge Auditorium of the Library of Congress, Washington, D.C., as part of the Inter-American Festival of Music. The score is dedicated to the New Music String Quartet "após a leitura excepcional desse quarteto na residência dos Embaixadores A. Berle em New York".

A typical performance lasts approximately 19 minutes.

== Analysis ==
Like most of Villa-Lobos's works in this medium, the quartet consists of the traditional four movements:

1. Allegro non troppo
2. Moderato
3. Scherzo (Vivace)
4. Allegro

The final, Allegro movement opens with a fugato section, with the voices entering at the unusual intervals of a seventh, a third, and a fourth above the first statement in the cello.

== Discography ==
Chronological, in order of recording dates.

- Villa-Lobos: Quatuors a Cordes Nos. 15/16/17. Quatuor Bessler-Reis (Bernardo Bessler, Michel Bessler, violins; Marie-Christine Springuel, viola; Alceu Reis, cello). Recorded at Studios Master in Rio de Janeiro, August–November 1988. CD recording, 1 disc: digital, 12 cm, stereo. Le Chant du Monde LDC 278 948. [S.l.]: [S.n.], 1989.
  - Also issued as part of Villa-Lobos: Os 17 quartetos de cordas / The 17 String Quartets. Quarteto Bessler-Reis and Quarteto Amazônia. CD recording, 6 sound discs: digital, 12 cm, stereo. Kuarup Discos KCX-1001 (KCD 045, M-KCD-034, KCD 080/1, KCD-051, KCD 042). Rio de Janeiro: Kuarup Discos, 1996.
- Heitor Villa-Lobos: String Quartets Nos. 3, 10 and 15. Danubius Quartet (Gyöngyvér Oláh [Quartets 3 and 10], Judit Tóth [Quartet 15] and Adél Miklós, violins; Cecilia Bodolai, viola; Ilona Ribli, cello). Recorded at the Rottenbiller Street Studio in Budapest, 15–19 June and 1–2 July 1992. CD recording, 1 disc: digital, 12 cm, stereo. Marco Polo 8.223393. A co-production with Records International. Germany: HH International, Ltd., 1993.
- Villa-Lobos: String Quartets, Volume 3. Quartets Nos. 7 and 15. Cuarteto Latinoamericano (Saúl Bitrán, Arón Bitrán, violins; Javier Montiel, viola; Alvaro Bitrán, cello). Recorded at the Sala Nezahualcóyotl in Mexico City, September 1996. Music of Latin American Masters. CD recording, 1 disc: digital, 12 cm, stereo. Dorian DOR-90246. Troy, NY: Dorian Recordings, 1997.
  - Reissued as part of Heitor Villa-Lobos: The Complete String Quartets. 6 CDs + 1 DVD with a performance of Quartet No. 1 and interview with the Cuarteto Latinoamericano. Dorian Sono Luminus. DSL-90904. Winchester, VA: Sono Luminus, 2009.
  - Also reissued (without the DVD) on Brilliant Classics 6634.

== Filmography ==
- Villa-Lobos: A integral dos quartetos de cordas. Quarteto Radamés Gnattali (Carla Rincón, Francisco Roa, violins; Fernando Thebaldi, viola; Hugo Pilger, cello); presented by Turibio Santos. Recorded from June 2010 to September 2011 at the Palácio do Catete, Palácio das Laranjeiras, and the Theatro Municipal, Rio de Janeiro. DVD and Blu-ray (VIBD11111), 3 discs. Rio de Janeiro: Visom Digital, 2012.
