= String Quartet No. 16 (Villa-Lobos) =

Villa-Lobos in June 1952

String Quartet No. 16 is the penultimate of seventeen quartets by the Brazilian composer Heitor Villa-Lobos. Villa-Lobos composed his Sixteenth Quartet in Paris in 1955.

It was first performed by the Rio de Janeiro String Quartet (also known as the Iacovino Quartet) on 3 September 1958 in Rio de Janeiro. The first British performance was given at the College of Further Education Hall, as part of the Bromsgrove Festival of Music, on 25 February 1964.

A typical performance lasts approximately 20 minutes.

== Analysis ==
The quartet consists of the traditional four movements:

1. Allegro non troppo
2. Molto andante (quasi Adagio)
3. Vivace (Scherzo)
4. Molto allegro

For its voice leading and tonal balance, the Sixteenth Quartet is regarded as one of the composer's best, particularly the first movement.

== Discography ==
Chronological, by date of recording.

- Villa-Lobos: String Quartet No. 16; Radamés Gnattali: Four Nocturnes, for piano and string quartet; José Vieira Brandão, Miniatura; César Guerra-Peixe: String Quartet No. 2. Quarteto Brasileiro (Santino Parpinelli and Jacques Nirenberg, violins; Henrique Nirenberg, viola; Eugen Ranevsky, cello). LP recording. CBS 60041. Brazil: CBS, 1966. Reissued on CD as Brazilian String Quartet. 1 disc: digital, 12 cm, stereo. Albany TROY420. Albany, NY: Albany Records, 2000.
- Villa-Lobos Concurso Internacional de Quarteto de Cordas, 1966. Quartet No. 11 (Quarteto Mario Andrade), Quartet No. 16 (Quarteto Rio de Janeiro). Recorded live at Sala Cecília Meireles, Rio de Janeiro. LP recording, 1 disc: 12 in., 33⅓ rpm, stereo. Museu Villa-Lobos MEC/DAC/MVL-013. Disco é cultura. Rio de Janeiro: Tapecar Gravações, 1975.
- Heitor. Villa-Lobos: String Quart No. 16; Henrique Oswald: Quarteto Brasileiro in E Minor, Op. 39. Quarteto Brasileiro da UFRJ. LP recording, 1 disc: analog, 33⅓ rpm, 12 in., stereo. CBS 160174. [S.l.]: CBS, 1971.
- Concurso Internacional de Quarteto de Cordas (1977: Rio de Janeiro). Heitor Villa-Lobos: String Quartets Nos. 16 and 17. Quarteto de Cuerdas de la Universidad Nacional de La Plata; Audubon Quartet. Recorded live at the Sala Cecília Meireles, Rio de Janeiro. LP recording, 1 sound disc: analog, 33⅓ rpm, 12 in. Tapecar MEC/DAC/CFC/MVL 020. Rio de Janeiro: Tapecar Gravações, 1977.
- Villa-Lobos: Quatuors a Cordes Nos. 15/16/17. Quatuor Bessler-Reis (Bernardo Bessler, Michel Bessler, violins; Marie-Christine Springuel, viola; Alceu Reis, cello). Recorded at Studios Master in Rio de Janeiro, August–November 1988. CD recording, 1 disc: digital, 12 cm, stereo. Le Chant du Monde LDC 278 948. [S.l.]: [S.n.], 1989.
  - Also issued as part of Villa-Lobos: Os 17 quartetos de cordas / The 17 String Quartets. Quarteto Bessler-Reis and Quarteto Amazônia. CD recording, 6 sound discs: digital, 12 cm, stereo. Kuarup Discos KCX-1001 (KCD 045, M-KCD-034, KCD 080/1, KCD-051, KCD 042). Rio de Janeiro: Kuarup Discos, 1996.
- Heitor Villa-Lobos: String Quartets Nos. 11, 16 and 17. Danubius Quartet (Judit Tóth and Adél Miklós, violins; Cecilia Bodolai, viola; Ilona Wibli, cello). Recorded at the Hungaroton Studios in Budapest, 15–16 October 1990, 28–30 January, and 11–15 February 1991. CD recording, 1 disc: digital, 12 cm, stereo. Marco Polo 8.223390. A co-production with Records International. Germany: HH International, Ltd., 1992.
- Villa-Lobos: String Quartets, Volume 4. Quartets Nos. 2, 12, 16. Cuarteto Latinoamericano (Saúl Bitrán, Arón Bitrán, violins; Javier Montiel, viola; Alvaro Bitrán, cello). Recorded at the Sala Blas Galindo of the Centro Nacional de las Artes in Mexico City, November and December 1998. Music of Latin American Masters. CD recording, 1 disc: digital, 12 cm, stereo. Dorian DOR-93179. Troy, NY: Dorian Recordings, 1998.
  - Reissued as part of Heitor Villa-Lobos: The Complete String Quartets. 6 CDs + 1 DVD with a performance of Quartet No. 1 and interview with the Cuarteto Latinoamericano. Dorian Sono Luminus. DSL-90904. Winchester, VA: Sono Luminus, 2009.
  - Also reissued (without the DVD) on Brilliant Classics 6634.

== Filmography ==
- Villa-Lobos: A integral dos quartetos de cordas. Quarteto Radamés Gnattali (Carla Rincón, Francisco Roa, violins; Fernando Thebaldi, viola; Hugo Pilger, cello); presented by Turibio Santos. Recorded from June 2010 to September 2011 at the Palácio do Catete, Palácio das Laranjeiras, and the Theatro Municipal, Rio de Janeiro. DVD and Blu-ray (VIBD11111), 3 discs. Rio de Janeiro: Visom Digital, 2012.
