= String Quartet No. 5 (Villa-Lobos) =

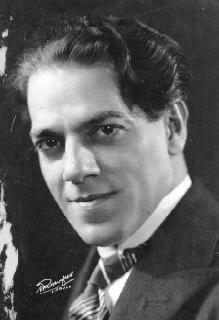
Heitor Villa-Lobos

String Quartet No. 5 ("Quarteto popular no. 1") is the fifth of 17 works in the genre by the Brazilian composer Heitor Villa-Lobos. Villa-Lobos composed his Fifth Quartet in São Paulo in 1931. The manuscript bears a dedication to João Alberto Lins de Barros the federally appointed Governor (Interventor) of the State of São Paulo from 26 November 1930 to 25 July 1931, though his name does not appear in the published score. The circumstances of the quartet's first performance are not recorded.

The Quarteto popular is the first of a pair of quartets written in the 1930s, and marks a return by Villa-Lobos to the string quartet after a hiatus of 14 years. Its composition also coincides with the composer's return to Brazil after a lengthy period spent mainly in Paris, and its marked turn to nationalism is associated with the political programme of the Getúlio Vargas regime. The subtitle, "Quarteto popular", likely refers to the use of actual popular Brazilian melodies. Villa-Lobos himself declared that this quartet is among his weaker compositions.

A typical performance lasts approximately 17 minutes.

== Analysis ==
This quartet, like all of Villa-Lobos's quartets except the first, consists of four movements:

1. Poco andantino
2. Vivo e energico
3. Andantino – Tempo giusto e ben ritmato
4. Allegro

The Fifth Quartet is unusual in Villa-Lobos's works in this genre for using genuine folk material, albeit in modified form.

Over the course of the first movement, the tempo changes many times, ranging from Lento to Presto. The long Lento section in b. 90 to 136 is characterised by lyrical melodic writing in the first violin accompanied by a complex rhythmic pattern in the other instruments.

The second movement's predominantly fast tempo is also interrupted after 11 bars by a Lento section featuring double stops in all four instruments and sul ponticello tremolo effects in the two violins. After eight bars, the opening tempo is resumed for the remainder of the movement, save for a concluding Molto lento coda of five bars.

The third movement inverts the relationship found in the first two movements by interrupting a predominantly slow tempo after only two bars with a fast and light-hearted section (Tempo giusto e ben ritmato) of sufficient length to make the opening material sound merely like a slow introduction. After 23 bars, however, a slow tempo (Adagio) is resumed, eventually giving way to the original Andantino. The short opening Andantino motive, played in unison, is one that Villa-Lobos often uses to suggest Indian music.

The finale, in contrast to the earlier movements, maintains a steady Allegro tempo throughout. After a brief introduction in parallel fourths, the main theme from the first movement returns, at double its original tempo but in the same key. A series of children's themes taken from Villa-Lobos's collection, Guia prático, provides the substance for the rest of the movement. The central section is based on the song "O Bastão ou mia gato" ("The Stick or a Cat's Meow"), played in harmonics in all four instruments, after which the opening section, minus the introduction, is repeated to create an ABA ternary form.

== Discography ==
In chronological order, by date of recording.

- Heitor Villa-Lobos: Brazilian Quartet No. 5. Quarteto Carioca (Borgeth [i.e. Oscar Borgerth?], first violin; Barraca, second violin; Orlando, viola; Iberé [i.e. Iberê Gomes Grosso?], cello). 2 sound discs: analog, 78 rpm, monaural, 12 in. Victor 11212, 11213. Red Seal Record. Camden, N.J.: Victor, [193-?]
- Heitor Villa-Lobos: Quarteto de cordas No. 1; Quarteto de cordas no. 5. Quarteto Bessler. LP recording, 1 disc: 33⅓ rpm, stereo, 12 in. EMI Angel 31C 051 422878. Brazil: EMI Angel, 1980.
- Villa-Lobos: Quatuors a Cordes Nos. 4/5/6. Quatuor Bessler-Reis (Bernardo Bessler, Michel Bessler, violins; Marie-Christine Springuel, viola; Alceu Reis, cello). Recorded at Studios Master in Rio de Janeiro, June–August 1987. CD recording, 1 disc: digital, 12 cm, stereo. Le Chant du Monde LDC 278 901. France: [S.n.], 1988.
  - Also issued as part of Villa-Lobos: Os 17 quartetos de cordas / The 17 String Quartets. Quarteto Bessler-Reis and Quarteto Amazônia. CD recording, 6 sound discs: digital, 12 cm, stereo. Kuarup Discos KCX-1001 (KCD 045, M-KCD-034, KCD 080/1, KCD-051, KCD 042). Rio de Janeiro: Kuarup Discos, 1996.
- Heitor Villa-Lobos: String Quartets Nos. 5, 9 and 12. Danubius Quartet (Gyöngyvér Oláh and Adél Miklós, violins; Cecilia Bodolai, viola; Ilona Ribli, cello). Recorded at the Rottenbiller Street Studio in Budapest from 18 to 23 May 1992. CD recording, 1 disc: digital, 12 cm, stereo. Marco Polo 8.223392. A co-production with Records International. Germany: HH International, Ltd., 1993.
- Villa-Lobos: String Quartets, Volume 5. Quartets Nos. 5, 10, 13. Cuarteto Latinoamericano (Saúl Bitrán, Arón Bitrán, violins; Javier Montiel, viola; Alvaro Bitrán, cello). Recorded at the Sala Blas Galindo of the Centro Nacional de las Artes in Mexico City, 24–28 January 2000. Music of Latin American Masters. CD recording, 1 disc: digital, 12 cm, stereo. Dorian DOR-93211. Troy, NY: Dorian Recordings, 2000.
  - Reissued as part of Heitor Villa-Lobos: The Complete String Quartets. 6 CDs + 1 DVD with a performance of Quartet No. 1 and interview with the Cuarteto Latinoamericano. Dorian Sono Luminus. DSL-90904. Winchester, VA: Sono Luminus, 2009.
  - Also reissued (without the DVD) on Brilliant Classics 6634.

== Filmography ==
- Villa-Lobos: A integral dos quartetos de cordas. Quarteto Radamés Gnattali (Carla Rincón, Francisco Roa, violins; Fernando Thebaldi, viola; Hugo Pilger, cello); presented by Turibio Santos. Recorded from June 2010 to September 2011 at the Palácio do Catete, Palácio das Laranjeiras, and the Theatro Municipal, Rio de Janeiro. DVD and Blu-ray (VIBD11111), 3 discs. Rio de Janeiro: Visom Digital, 2012.
