= String Quartet No. 1 (Villa-Lobos) =

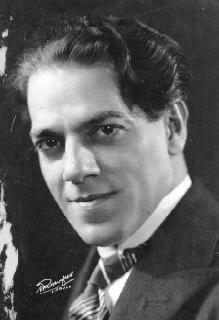
Heitor Villa-Lobos

String Quartet No. 1 is the first of 17 works in the genre by the Brazilian composer Heitor Villa-Lobos, originally written in Nova Friburgo in 1915 and extensively revised in 1946.

Villa-Lobos composed his First Quartet in Nova Friburgo, Brazil in 1915, originally under the title Suíte de Quartetos de Corda: Suíte Graciosa and in just three movements: "Cantilena" (Andante), "Cançonetinha Grega" (Allegretto), and "Brinquedo". This version, the manuscript of which is dated 5 March 1915, was given its first performance privately at the home of the Brazilian composer, pianist, and teacher Homero de Sá Barreto (1884–1924), on 3 December 1915. The score of this version, which was never given a public performance, is dedicated to the Quarteto de Friburgo, for whom it was written.

In 1946, believing the original manuscript to have been lost, Villa-Lobos rewrote the score, adding three movements and retitling the work, String Quartet No. 1. This version was performed in Rio de Janeiro for the first time by the Iacovino Quartet on 7 August 1946.

A typical performance lasts approximately 18 minutes.

== Analysis ==
The quartet consists of six movements:

1. "Cantilena" (Andante)
2. "Brincadeira" (Allegretto scherzando)
3. "Canto lírico" (Moderato)
4. "Cançoneta" (Andantino quasi allegretto)
5. "Melancolia" (Lento)
6. "Saltando como um Saci" (Allegro)

The six short movements of this quartet take the form of a suite, alternating cantabile and dance movements.

The lively and humorous second movement, titled "Brincadeira" (Joke), features effects of pizzicato, battendo coll'arco (striking the strings with the back of the bow), and harmonics, both natural and artificial.

Throughout the third movement the melodic material is confined entirely to the viola and first violin. The composer describes this movement as "a deliberate and elevated caricature of romantic arias, transcending the delicious idea of a romanza sung by a baritone accompanied by a small provincial orchestra".

The fourth and fifth movements suggest passages in the Bachianas Brasileiras, particularly the violin melody in "Melancolia" resembles the "Canto do capadócio" from Bachianas No. 2.

== Discography ==
In order of date of recording:

- Heitor.Villa-Lobos: Na música de câmara. Quartets Nos. 1 and 17. Quarteto Rio de Janeiro. LP recording, 1 disc: analog, 33⅓ rpm, 12 in., stereo. [Rio de Janeiro]: Caravelle, [196-]
  - Reissued as part of: Heitor Villa-Lobos: String Quartets nos. 1, 6, and 17. Quarteto Brasileiro da UFRJ. CD recording, 1 sound disc: digital, 12 cm, stereo. [S.l.]: Albany Records, 2005.
- Heitor Villa-Lobos: Quarteto de cordas No. 1; Quarteto de cordas no. 5. Quarteto Bessler. LP recording, 1 disc: 33⅓ rpm, stereo, 12 in. EMI Angel 31C 051 422878. Brazil: EMI Angel, 1980.
- Villa-Lobos: Quatuors a Cordes Nos. 1–2–3. Quatuor Bessler-Reis (Bernardo Bessler, Michel Bessler, violins; Marie-Christine Springuel, viola; Alceu Reis, cello). Recorded at Studios Master in Rio de Janeiro, July 1988 and September – December 1989. CD recording, 1 disc: digital, 12 cm, stereo. Le Chant du Monde LDC 278 1052. [S.l.]: [S.n.], 1991.
  - Also issued as part of Villa-Lobos: Os 17 quartetos de cordas / The 17 String Quartets. Quarteto Bessler-Reis and Quarteto Amazônia. CD recording, 6 sound discs: digital, 12 cm, stereo. Kuarup Discos KCX-1001 (KCD 045, M-KCD-034, KCD 080/1, KCD-051, KCD 042). Rio de Janeiro: Kuarup Discos, 1996.
- Heitor Villa-Lobos: String Quartets Nos. 1, 8 and 13. Danubius Quartet (Judit Tóth and Adél Miklós, violins; Cecilia Bodolai, viola; Ilona Wibli, cello). Recorded at the Hungaroton Studios in Budapest, 10–19 October 1990. CD recording, 1 disc: digital, 12 cm, stereo. Marco Polo 8.223389. A co-production with Records International. Germany: HH International, Ltd., 1992.
- Villa-Lobos: String Quartets, Volume 1. Quartets Nos. 6, 1, 17. Cuarteto Latinoamericano (Saúl Bitrán, Arón Bitrán, violins; Javier Montiel, viola; Alvaro Bitrán, cello). Recorded at the Troy Savings Bank Music Hall in Troy, NY, April 1994. Music of Latin American Masters. CD recording, 1 disc: digital, 12 cm, stereo. Dorian DOR-90205. Troy, NY: Dorian Recordings, 1995.
  - Reissued as part of Heitor Villa-Lobos: The Complete String Quartets. 6 CDs + 1 DVD with a performance of Quartet No. 1 and interview with the Cuarteto Latinoamericano. Dorian Sono Luminus. DSL-90904. Winchester, VA: Sono Luminus, 2009.
  - Also reissued (without the DVD) on Brilliant Classics 6634.

== Filmography ==
- Villa-Lobos: A integral dos quartetos de cordas. Quarteto Radamés Gnattali (Carla Rincón, Francisco Roa, violins; Fernando Thebaldi, viola; Hugo Pilger, cello); presented by Turibio Santos. Recorded from June 2010 to September 2011 at the Palácio do Catete, Palácio das Laranjeiras, and the Theatro Municipal, Rio de Janeiro. DVD and Blu-ray (VIBD11111), 3 discs. Rio de Janeiro: Visom Digital, 2012.
