= String Quartet No. 7 (Villa-Lobos) =

1942 work by Heitor Villa-Lobos

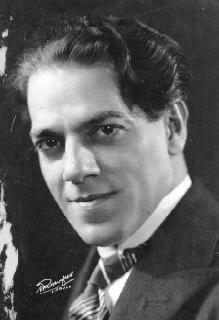
Heitor Villa-Lobos

String Quartet No. 7 is the seventh of 17 works in the genre by the Brazilian composer Heitor Villa-Lobos. Villa-Lobos composed his Seventh Quartet in Rio de Janeiro in 1942. The Quarteto Borgerth, to whom the score is dedicated, gave the first performance on 30 May 1945, at the Theatro Municipal in Rio de Janeiro.

With a typical performance lasting approximately 37 minutes, it is the longest of Villa-Lobos's string quartets.

== Analysis ==
The quartet consists of four movements:

1. Allegro
2. Andante
3. Scherzo (Allegro vivace)
4. Allegro giusto

Because of the exceptional virtuosity called for in all four movements, the composer suggested the Seventh Quartet might be called the "Concertante Quartet". The first movement is a conscious updating of sonata form in accordance with a broad conception of post-tonal organization. It may be described, therefore, as a neoclassical work.

== Discography ==
Chronological by date of recording.

- Heitor Villa-Lobos: String Quartets Nos. 2 and 7. Danubius Quartet (Mária Zs. Szabó and Adél Miklós, violins; Ágnes Apró, viola; Ilona Ribli, cello). Recorded at the Rottenbiller Street Studio in Budapest, 12–16 November 1992. CD recording, 1 disc: digital, 12 cm, stereo. Marco Polo 8.223394. A co-production with Records International. Germany: HH International, Ltd., 1994.
- Heitor Villa-Lobos: Quartetos de cordas 7, 8, 9, 10, 11. Quarteto Amazônia. CD recording, 2 discs: digital, 12 cm, stereo. Barcelona: Discmedi D.L., 2000.
  - Also issued as part of Villa-Lobos: Os 17 quartetos de cordas / The 17 String Quartets. Quarteto Bessler-Reis and Quarteto Amazônia. CD recording, 6 sound discs: digital, 12 cm, stereo. Kuarup Discos KCX-1001 (KCD 045, M-KCD-034, KCD 080/1, KCD-051, KCD 042). Rio de Janeiro: Kuarup Discos, 1996.
- Villa-Lobos: String Quartets, Volume 3. Quartets Nos. 7 and 15. Cuarteto Latinoamericano (Saúl Bitrán, Arón Bitrán, violins; Javier Montiel, viola; Alvaro Bitrán, cello). Recorded at the Sala Nezahualcóyotl in Mexico City, September 1996. Music of Latin American Masters. CD recording, 1 disc: digital, 12 cm, stereo. Dorian DOR-90246. Troy, NY: Dorian Recordings, 1997.
  - Reissued as part of Heitor Villa-Lobos: The Complete String Quartets. 6 CDs + 1 DVD with a performance of Quartet No. 1 and interview with the Cuarteto Latinoamericano. Dorian Sono Luminus. DSL-90904. Winchester, VA: Sono Luminus, 2009.
  - Also reissued (without the DVD) on Brilliant Classics 6634.

== Filmography ==
- Villa-Lobos: A integral dos quartetos de cordas. Quarteto Radamés Gnattali (Carla Rincón, Francisco Roa, violins; Fernando Thebaldi, viola; Hugo Pilger, cello); presented by Turibio Santos. Recorded from June 2010 to September 2011 at the Palácio do Catete, Palácio das Laranjeiras, and the Theatro Municipal, Rio de Janeiro. DVD and Blu-ray (VIBD11111), 3 discs. Rio de Janeiro: Visom Digital, 2012.
