= String Quartet No. 2 (Villa-Lobos) =

Composition for string quartet by Heitor Villa-Lobos

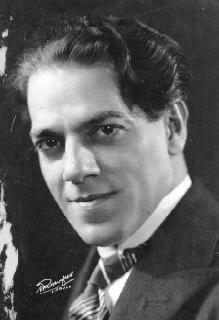
Heitor Villa-Lobos

String Quartet No. 2 is the one of a series of 17 works in the genre by the Brazilian composer Heitor Villa-Lobos.

Villa-Lobos composed his Second Quartet in 1915, either in Rio de Janeiro or Nova Friburgo. It was first performed on 3 February 1917 by a quartet consisting of Judith Barcellos and Dagmar Noronha Gitahy, violins, Orlando Frederico, viola, and Alfredo Gomes, cello. The published score bears the indication "Op. 56".

A typical performance lasts approximately 20 minutes.

== Analysis ==
As in all of Villa-Lobos's quartets except the first, there are four movements:

1. Allegro non troppo
2. Scherzo: Allegro
3. Andante
4. Allegro deciso – Presto – Prestissimo final

One writer, however, regards the Prestissimo final as a separate, fifth movement.

This early quartet in Villa-Lobos's catalogue is composed according to the cyclic principles developed by César Franck and Vincent d'Indy. Franck and Debussy were two of the most important influences on Villa-Lobos's early style, and he had studied d'Indy's 1912 textbook, Cours de Composition Musicale.

The composer describes the scherzo as a novelty, played in harmonics, "whose harmonies involve a syncopated melody in a context that suggests small bamboo rustic flutes (a sort of Panpipe played using the nose by the Pareci Indians of Mato Grosso)".

== Discography ==
In order of date of recordings:

- Villa-Lobos: Quatuors a Cordes Nos. 1–2–3. Quatuor Bessler-Reis (Bernardo Bessler, Michel Bessler, violins; Marie-Christine Springuel, viola; Alceu Reis, cello). Recorded at Studios Master in Rio de Janeiro, July 1988 and September – December 1989. CD recording, 1 disc: digital, 12 cm, stereo. Le Chant du Monde LDC 278 1052. [S.l.]: [S.n.], 1991.
  - Also issued as part of Villa-Lobos: Os 17 quartetos de cordas / The 17 String Quartets. Quarteto Bessler-Reis and Quarteto Amazônia. CD recording, 6 sound discs: digital, 12 cm, stereo. Kuarup Discos KCX-1001 (KCD 045, M-KCD-034, KCD 080/1, KCD-051, KCD 042). Rio de Janeiro: Kuarup Discos, 1996.
- Heitor Villa-Lobos: String Quartets Nos. 2 and 7. Danubius Quartet (Mária Zs. Szabó and Adél Miklós, violins; Ágnes Apró, viola; Ilona Ribli, cello). Recorded at the Rottenbiller Street Studio in Budapest, 12–16 November 1992. CD recording, 1 disc: digital, 12 cm, stereo. Marco Polo 8.223394. A co-production with Records International. Germany: HH International, Ltd., 1994.
- Villa-Lobos: String Quartets, Volume 4. Quartets Nos. 2, 12, 16. Cuarteto Latinoamericano (Saúl Bitrán, Arón Bitrán, violins; Javier Montiel, viola; Alvaro Bitrán, cello). Recorded at the Sala Blas Galindo of the Centro Nacional de las Artes in Mexico City, November and December 1998. Music of Latin American Masters. CD recording, 1 disc: digital, 12 cm, stereo. Dorian DOR-93179. Troy, NY: Dorian Recordings, 1998.
  - Reissued as part of Heitor Villa-Lobos: The Complete String Quartets. 6 CDs + 1 DVD with a performance of Quartet No. 1 and interview with the Cuarteto Latinoamericano. Dorian Sono Luminus. DSL-90904. Winchester, VA: Sono Luminus, 2009.
  - Also reissued (without the DVD) on Brilliant Classics 6634.

== Filmography ==
- Villa-Lobos: A integral dos quartetos de cordas. Quarteto Radamés Gnattali (Carla Rincón, Francisco Roa, violins; Fernando Thebaldi, viola; Hugo Pilger, cello); presented by Turibio Santos. Recorded from June 2010 to September 2011 at the Palácio do Catete, Palácio das Laranjeiras, and the Theatro Municipal, Rio de Janeiro. DVD and Blu-ray (VIBD11111), 3 discs. Rio de Janeiro: Visom Digital, 2012.
