= Winifred Bambrick =

Canadian musician and novelist

- Born: Winifred Estella Bambrick; February 21, 1892; Ottawa, Ontario, Canada
- Origin: New York City, New York, United States
- Died: April 11, 1969 (aged 77) Montreal, Canada
- Genre: Classical music
- Occupations: harpist, novelist
- Instrument: Harp
- Years active: 1913–1937

Winifred Estella Bambrick (February 21, 1892 – April 11, 1969) was a Canadian classical musician and novelist. She won the Governor General's Award for English-language fiction in 1946 for her book Continental Revue.

== Early life ==
Bambrick was born in Ottawa, Ontario. Her father was John Bambrick, a grocer and her mother was Catherine Corbett, John's second wife. She was the youngest of three children all of whom were musically inclined. However, Winifred showed the most promise. She began harp lessons at the Rideau Street Convent. She performed with the Ottawa Symphony Orchestra in 1910 and 1911, but soon left to study harp in New York City.

== Career ==
Bambrick made her debut as a harpist at New York City's Aeolian Hall on October 22, 1913. The following year, she recorded a number of selections for Edison Records' Diamond Disc series, including Robert Ambrose's "One Sweetly Solemn Thought", Gabriel Verdalle's "Vision" and Angelo Francis Pinto's "Tarantelle". She subsequently played in John Philip Sousa's band from 1920 to 1930, and then spent the 1930s performing as a solo artist and with a circus orchestra in Europe. It was during one of these European tours where she drew inspiration for her only published book, Continental Revue. In 1939, she was on tour with the circus in Leipzig when she narrowly escaped internment when World War II began. She was travelling with her mother and the travelled west on the last train where they made it to England and eventually back to Canada.

Her experience in Europe, which coincided with the events that would lead to World War II, inspired the novel "Continental Revue", which was published in 1946. She gave a recital in Ottawa and began a concert tour which took her across Canada to places such as Winnipeg, Regina, Edmonton, Calgary and Vancouver. However, the tour ended in time for her to receive the Governor General's Award for English-language fiction at the Canadian authors Association Convention, which took place the summer of 1947. When attending the Canadian authors Association Convention, Bambrick confessed in an interview "I had planned on going to Vancouver anyway, but at the time I made my reservations I never dreamed I'd go out to receive any award."

Her prize winning novel, which is based on her concert tours through Europe before the war, took one year to write. She stated, "there were more than 1,000 pages of it at first, but I managed to cut it down to a little over 400." In the end she had to cut her story in half. Entire chapters were left out and "some of my favourite ones at that," she said. There is some evidence that the book was co-written or ghost-written by another author, Edmund Fancott, but his name was not included in the published edition. Continuously, some of the left over material from her first novel, eventually turned into short stories. Her second novel, "The Lasting Spring", was reportedly completed in 1947 which tells another story about her music career but, was never published.

Suffering from emphysema, she gave up public performance around 1960, and spent the remainder of her life living in Montreal and Sept-Îles.
