= 1915 in British music =

This is a summary of 1915 in music in the United Kingdom.

== Events ==
- March – The Musical Times publishes an appreciation of Frederick Delius by the composer Peter Warlock (Philip Heseltine).
- December – Having been invalided out of the armed forces, composer Havergal Brian and his family move to Erdington, Warwickshire.
- date unknown
  - Composer Herbert Howells is given six months to live, and becomes the first person in the UK to receive radium treatment (he will live on until 1983).
  - William Penfro Rowlands's hymn tune "Blaenwern" is first published in Henry H. Jones' Cân a Moliant.
  - The Band of the Welsh Guards is formed, simultaneously with the establishment of the regiment.

== Popular music ==
- Albert William Ketèlbey – "In a Monastery Garden"
- T. W. Conner – "A Little Bit of Cucumber"
- George Henry Powell & Felix Powell – "Pack Up Your Troubles in Your Old Kit-Bag"

== Classical music: new works ==
- Granville Bantock – Hebridean Symphony
- Frank Bridge – Lament
- Dora Bright – A Dancer's Adventure (ballet)
- Frederick Delius – Double Concerto for violin, cello and orchestra
- Edward Elgar – Incidental music for The Starlight Express
- Gustav Holst – Japanese Suite
- John Ireland – Preludes for Piano
- Percy Pitt
  - Sakura suite No. 2 (Suite de Ballet)
  - Ballet Egyptien
  - Suite pour petite orchestre

== Opera ==
- Rutland Boughton – Bethlehem

== Musical theatre ==
- 24 April – Betty, with lyrics by Adrian Ross and music by Paul Rubens, opens at Daly's Theatre, starring Winifred Barnes.
- 28 April – Tonight's the Night, with lyrics by Percy Greenbank and music by Paul Rubens, opens at Daly's Theatre, featuring George Grossmith and Leslie Henson.

== Births ==
- 11 January – Harry Lewis, musician and composer (died 1998)
- 25 January – Ewan MacColl, folk singer and songwriter (died 1989)
- 4 February – Norman Wisdom, comedian, singer and actor (died 2010)
- 10 March – Charles Groves, conductor (died 1992)
- 19 March – Nancy Evans, operatic mezzo-soprano (died 2000)
- 25 March – Dorothy Squires, singer (died 1998)
- 29 March – George Chisholm, jazz trombonist and comedian (died 1997)
- 26 August – Humphrey Searle, composer (died 1982)
- 28 November – Pamela Harrison, pianist and composer (died 1990)

== Deaths ==
- 15 January – Florence Everilda Goodeve, composer and lyricist, 53
- 4 June – William Denis Browne, pianist, organist and composer, 26 (killed in action)
- 6 June – William Hayman Cummings, tenor, organist and composer, 83
- 10 December – David Jenkins, composer, 66

== See also ==
- 1915 in the United Kingdom
