= Blame It On The Blues =

1914 American jazz song

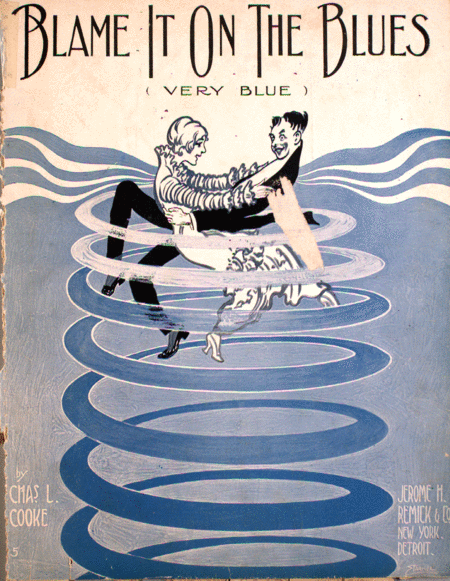
Sheet music cover, 1915

Blame It On The Blues is an American jazz song composed by Charles L. Cooke in 1914. It was written as a piano rag. The song is not a blues song despite its title.

The song has been recorded by Ken Colyer, Sidney Bechet, Claude Luter, the Wilbur DeParis Band and the New Black Eagle Jazz Band, among others.
