= Morton Harvey =

American singer-songwriter

- Born: 1886; Omaha, Nebraska, U.S.
- Died: August 15, 1961 (aged 74/75); Los Gatos, California, U.S.
- Occupations: Vaudeville performer, singer, photographer
- Spouse: Betty Baxter
- Musical career
- Also known as: Gene Rogers
- Genres: Blues, Protest
- Years active: 1914–1917
- Labels: Victor Records; Columbia Records; Emerson Records

Morton Harvey (1886 – August 15, 1961) was an American vaudeville performer and singer who had a moderately successful recording career during the mid-1910s.

== Career ==
Harvey was born in Omaha, Nebraska. His family wanted him to become a minister, but he had theatrical ambitions, and was able to secure a position in a traveling show while on a trip to Chicago, Illinois. He eventually gained a recording contract, just a few years after records began to become popular. Though most of his recordings were not best sellers, he is notable for being the first singer to record a blues song, the "Memphis Blues" by W.C. Handy which he recorded on October 2, 1914. Harvey later stated: "[A]lthough the orchestra that accompanied me...was composed of symphonic players, it wasn't their fault that they didn't get a 'blues' quality into the record. The 'Blues' style of singing and playing, which became so familiar later, was just about to be born. Even the dance records of 'The Memphis Blues' made during that period were played as straight one-steps. However, there were a few good old-fashioned 'trombone smears' in the orchestral effects of my 'Memphis Blues' record."

Harvey is also notable for recording the antiwar protest song “I Didn't Raise My Boy to Be a Soldier” in 1915. The song became a hit as, at the time, the majority of Americans wanted the United States to stay out of World War I. The song fell out of favor when, in 1917, the United States joined the war effort. Shortly thereafter, Harvey stopped recording, as the sentiments of ”I Didn't Raise My Boy to Be a Soldier” and other protest songs came to be considered unpatriotic. Many documentaries about World War I contain the song, however, and it is still on this song that Harvey's voice is heard by the most people. There is some dispute as to whether he was a baritone or tenor.

== Later years and death ==
Harvey remained a vaudeville performer through the mid-1920s, often as half of a duet. He also performed with his new wife, Betty Baxter, on occasion. After his retirement from show business, he moved to Oklahoma where he managed a radio station. In 1941 after the outbreak of World War II, he moved to San Francisco, California, where he served as director of job relations at the War Manpower Commission, and then as personnel director of an Army hospital. In 1946 he opened a photography studio in Los Gatos, California and photographed the Santa Clara Valley. Even after he moved onto other careers, he still continued to sing and write songs in his spare time.

Harvey died in Los Gatos, California on August 15, 1961.
