= Fulgencio Aquino =

Venezuelan musician and composer (1915–1994)

Background information
- Also known as: King of the Tuyera Harp
- Born: January 01 1915; Sabaneta, Miranda state, Venezuela
- Died: July 21, 1994 Caracas, Venezuela
- Genre: Central Joropo
- Occupations: musician, harpist, composer
- Instrument: Tuyera Harp
- Years active: 1925–1992

Fulgencio Aquino (January 1, 1915 – July 21, 1994), was a Venezuelan musician and popular composer, the author of the song El gato enmochilao.

== See also ==
- Venezuelan music
