= Gabriel Verdalle =

French harpist and composer (1847–1918)

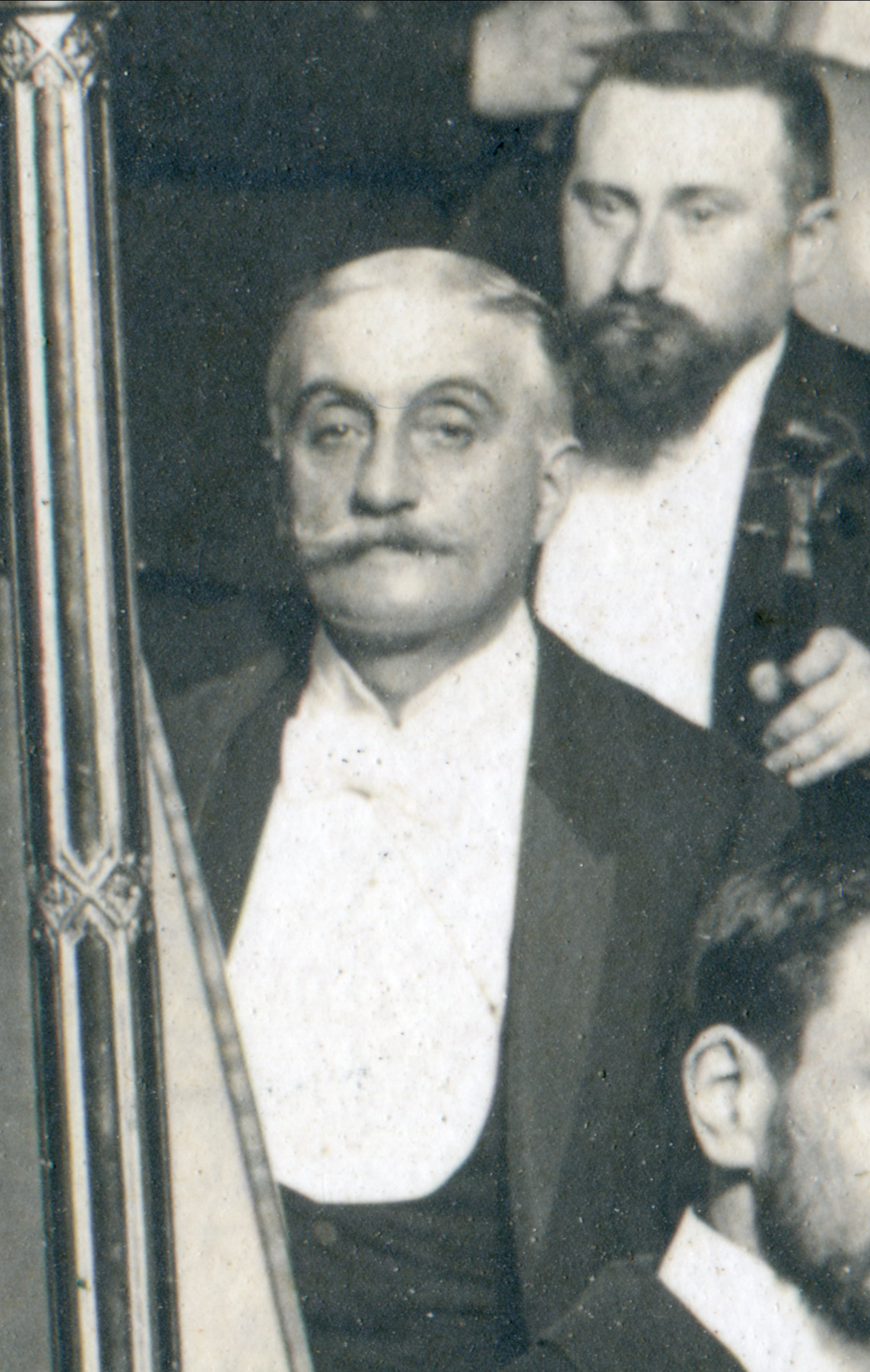
Gabriel Verdalle

Gabriel Verdalle (1847–1918) (Note: Some authority control records give his year of death as 1915. See, e.g., VIAF 58324843.) was a French virtuoso harpist and composer who held the position of Principal Harp at the Paris Opera for most of his career.

He wrote numerous pieces for solo harp and duets with harp. Most of his compositions were published by Carl Giessel Jr in Bayreuth between 1898 and 1901 and a reprinted a few years later by Wilhelm Zimmermann in Leipzig.

== Works ==
=== With opus ===
All works are for solo harp unless specified.

- Op.1. Andante religioso
- Op.2. L'oiseau-mouche
- Op.3. Petite marche
- Op.4. Aubade
- Op.5. Sérénade
- Op.6. Romance sans paroles
- Op.7. Adagio
- Op.8. Valse-Caprice
- Op.9. Mazurka
- Op.10. Barcarolle
- Op.11. Ballade
- Op.12. Caprice original
- Op.13. Prière
- Op.14. Air de ballet
- Op.15. Bébé dort!
- Op.16. Canzonetta (1898)
- Op.18. Méditation pour violoncelle et harpe (cello and harp)
- Op.20–22. Trois Romances sans Paroles No. 1. Op. 20 in F. No. 2. Op. 21 in D#. No.3 Op. 22 in F.
- Op.20 (bis) Larghetto pour violon et harpe en sol (1898) (violin and harp)
- Op.23. Saltarelle
- Op.24. Rêverie pour violon et harpe (violin and harp)
- Op.26. Cantilène pour violon et harpe (violin and harp)
- Op.27. Sevillana
- Op.29. Chant d'Amour pour violon et harpe (violin and harp)
- Op.30. Mélancolie pour violon et harpe (violin and harp)
- Op.32. Larmes et Rires pour violon et harpe (violin and harp)
- Op.33. Invocation
- Op.34. Doux songe
- Op.39. Lucciola
- Op.40. Danse slave
- Op.41. Légende bretonne
- Op.42. Remembrance
- Op.43. Recueillement
- Op.45. Childish March
- Op.46. Leggenda d'amore
- Op.67. Primavera
- Op.73. Badinage
- Op.76. Amoroso
- Op.77. Serpoletta
- Op.79. Berceuse
- Op.84. Fantasia pour harpe en fa majeur (published by Izzo, 1901)
- Op.87. Scherzetto
- Op. 89 Impromptu

=== Without opus ===
- Air de ballet No.4
- Butterflies, morceau caractéristique
- A Capri
- Capricciosa, valse lente
- Impromptu No.2
- Vision
- 6 Morceaux pour harpe
- Ninetta, sérénade andalouse pour piano (1904)
- Divertissement pour piano (1902)
- Sous l'olivier, mélodie pour voix et harpe (lyrics by Jacques Linerais)
- On the Lake
