= Laranjeiras Palace =

Official residence of the Governor of Rio de Janeiro, Brazil

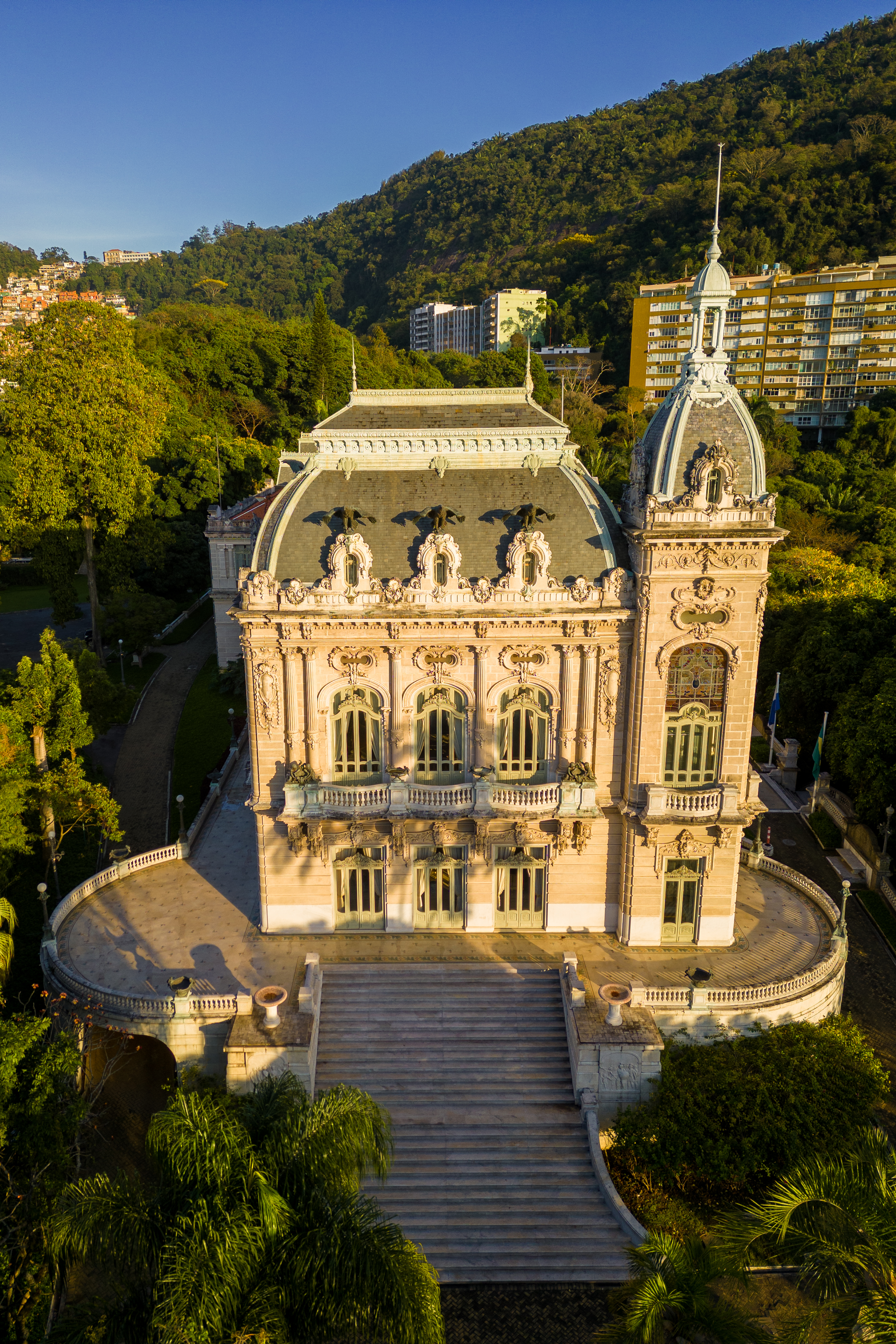
- Palácio Laranjeiras
- Interactive map of the Laranjeiras Palace area

General information
- Location: Rio de Janeiro, Brazil
- Construction started: 1909

The Laranjeiras Palace (Portuguese: Palácio das Laranjeiras; literally "Palace of the Orange Trees") is the official residence of the Governor of the State of the Rio de Janeiro, Brazil. The palace is located within Eduardo Guinle Park, a park in the Laranjeiras neighborhood of the city of Rio de Janeiro. It should not be confused with Guanabara Palace, located in the same neighborhood (at Pinheiro Machado Street), which is the official seat of the government of the State of Rio de Janeiro.

== History ==
Formerly the residence of one of the wealthiest Brazilian families, the palace was purchased by the Brazilian Federal Government in 1947 to host visitors, such as foreign heads of state or heads of government. At that time, the city of Rio de Janeiro was the capital of Brazil. In 1974, the Federal Government ceded ownership of the palace to the former State of Guanabara.

Before becoming the official residence of the state governor, the palace was a presidential residence. Its use as an official residence began in the presidency of Jucelino Kubitschek, who opted to use the seat of the presidency, the Catete Palace, solely as a workplace. President Kubitschek used the Laranjeiras Palace as his main residence until the transfer of the Federal capital to Brasília.

From the transfer of the seat of the Government to the new capital city of Brasília in 1960 until 1974, when it was ceded to the Rio de Janeiro State Government, the Laranjeiras Palace remained an official palace of the Presidency of the Republic, for use as a residence and workplace of the nation's chief executive when the president was in Rio de Janeiro.

During the first decade after the founding of Brasília it was very common for presidents to travel to Rio de Janeiro and to spend a considerable amount of time in there, as although no longer the capital, in the 1960s Rio de Janeiro was still home to all foreign embassies. Brasília was not regarded as a good place to live, as many services had not yet been established in the new capital, so during the sixties, several important official acts of Government took place in Laranjeiras Palace. In the 70's, use of the Palace by the presidency declined as the city of Brasília grew, leading to the decision by the Federal Government to hand over the palace to the State Government of Rio de Janeiro.

== Timeline ==
1909 to 1913 - Built to serve as a residence for the family of Eduardo Guinle, it received the designation as Eduardo Guinle Palacete.

1947 - During the government of President Dutra it was purchased by the Federal Government to host Heads of State and other distinguished visitors who were visiting the capital of Brazil.

1956 - After the death of President Vargas (who committed suicide in the Palace of Catete), his successor, Jucelino Kubitschek, began using the Laranjeiras Palace as his residence. The Catete Palace was retained only as the President's workplace.

1960 - With the change of the capital to Brasília, the Palácio Laranjeiras remained the official residence of the presidents when in Rio de Janeiro and still received distinguished guests.

1968 - President Costa e Silva signed in the palace library the famous AI-5.

1969 - It was the seat of the Federal Government under the military junta that ruled the country.

1974 - After merging the states of Guanabara and Rio de Janeiro, President Geisel gave the Laranjeiras Palace to the new state, with the intention to only serve as residence for their governors.

1983 - It was declared a heritage site by the Institute of National Historical and Artistic Heritage - IPHAN.

1975 to the present - Official residence the governors of the State of Rio de Janeiro. Guanabara Palace (where Governors of the former State of Guanabara both worked and resided until 1975) retained solely as the Governor's workplace.

== Gallery ==
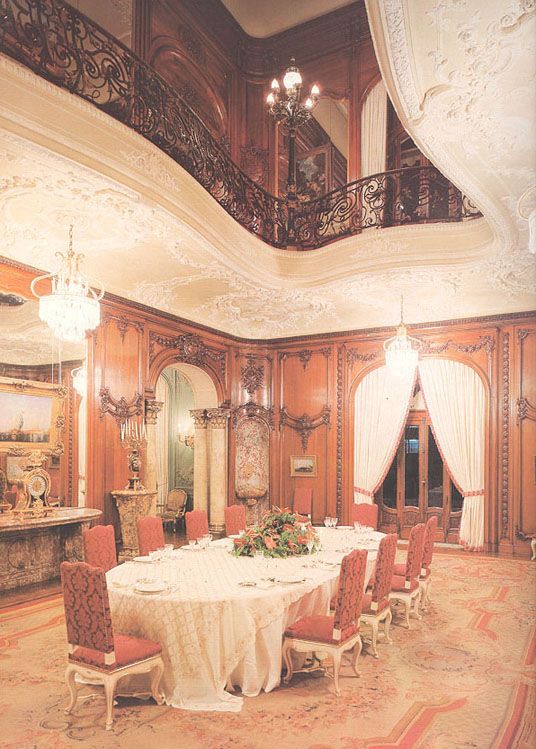
Dining room

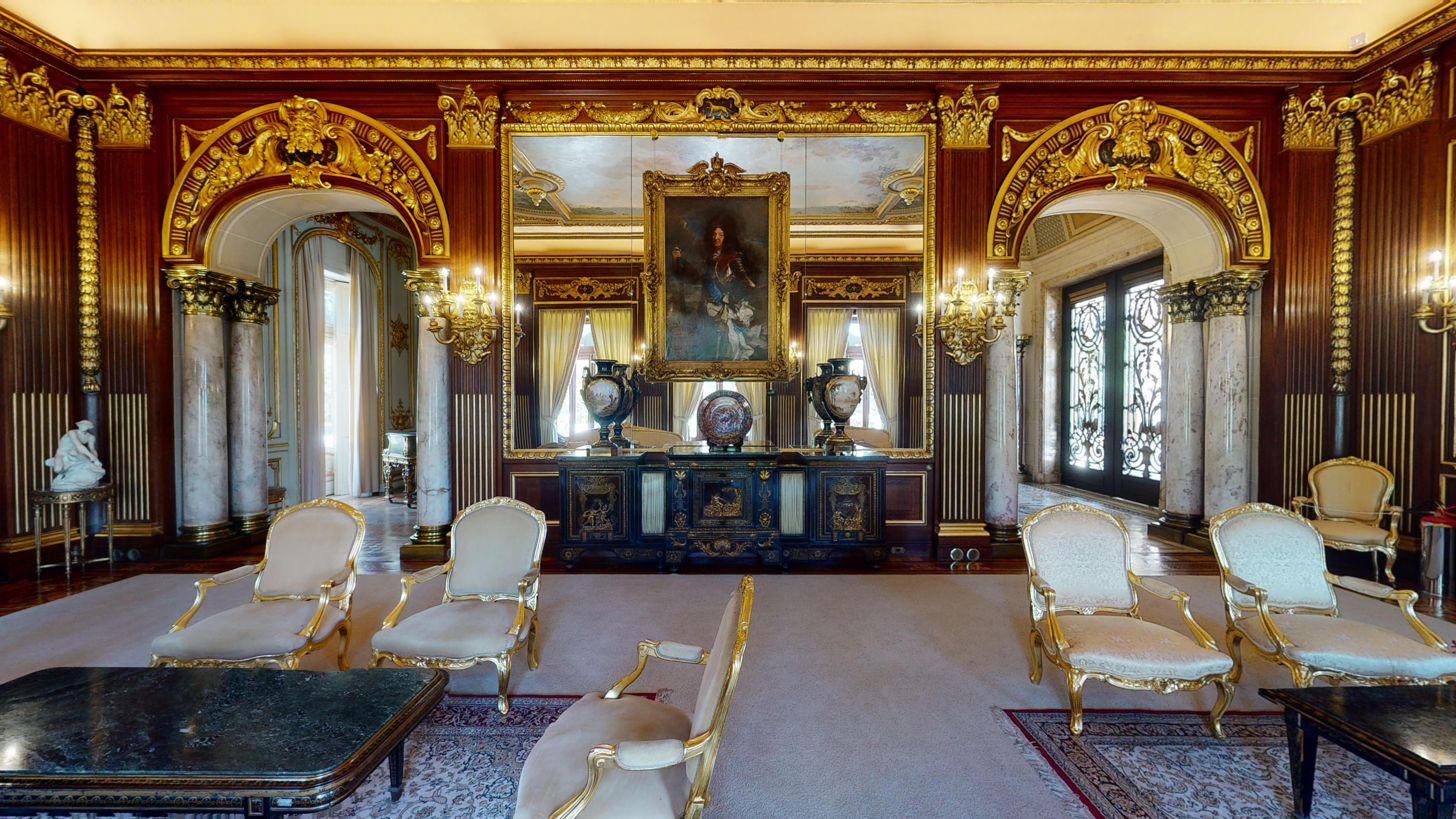
Louis XIV Hall

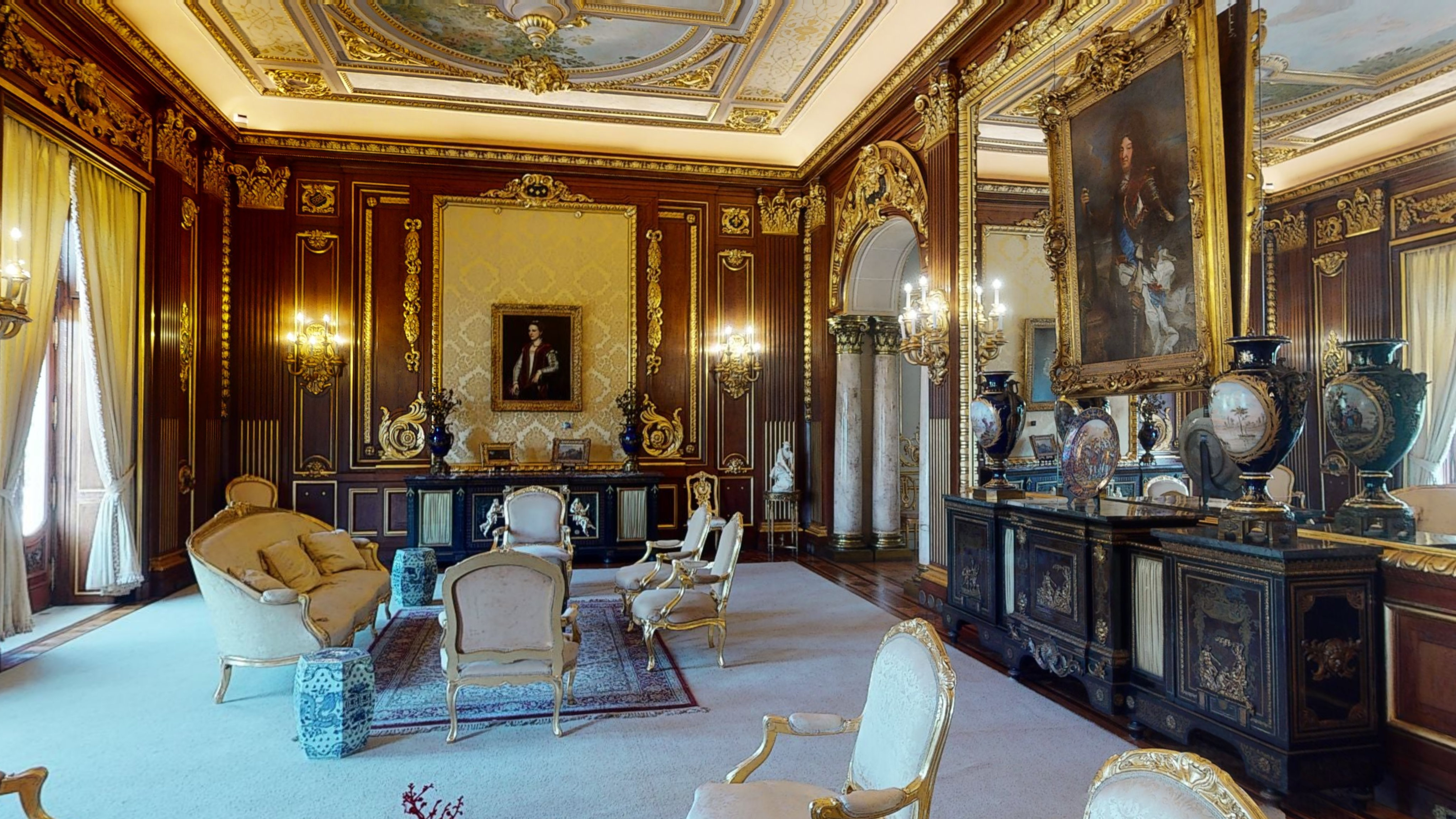
Louis XIV Hall

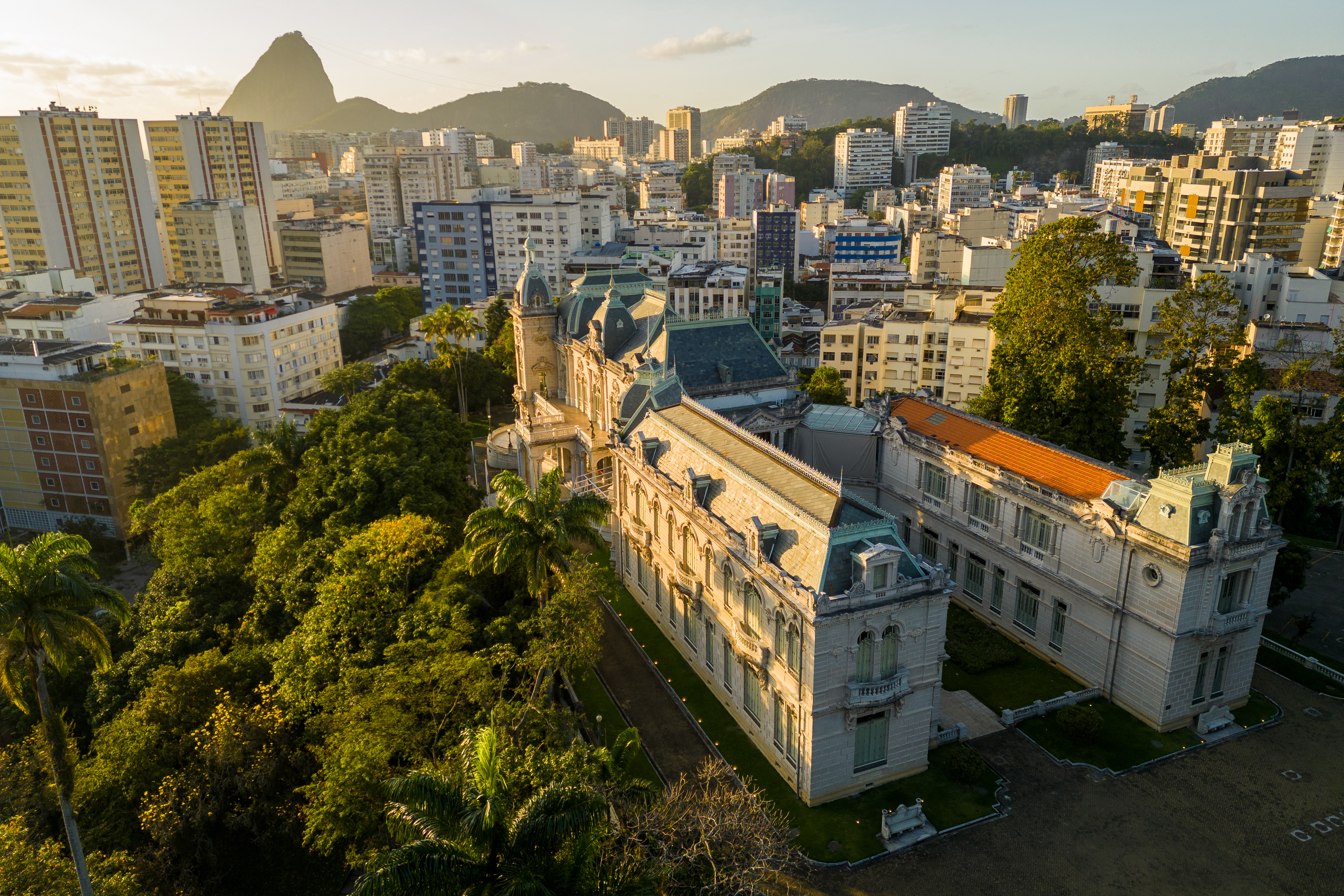
Surroundings with Sugarloaf Mountain in the background

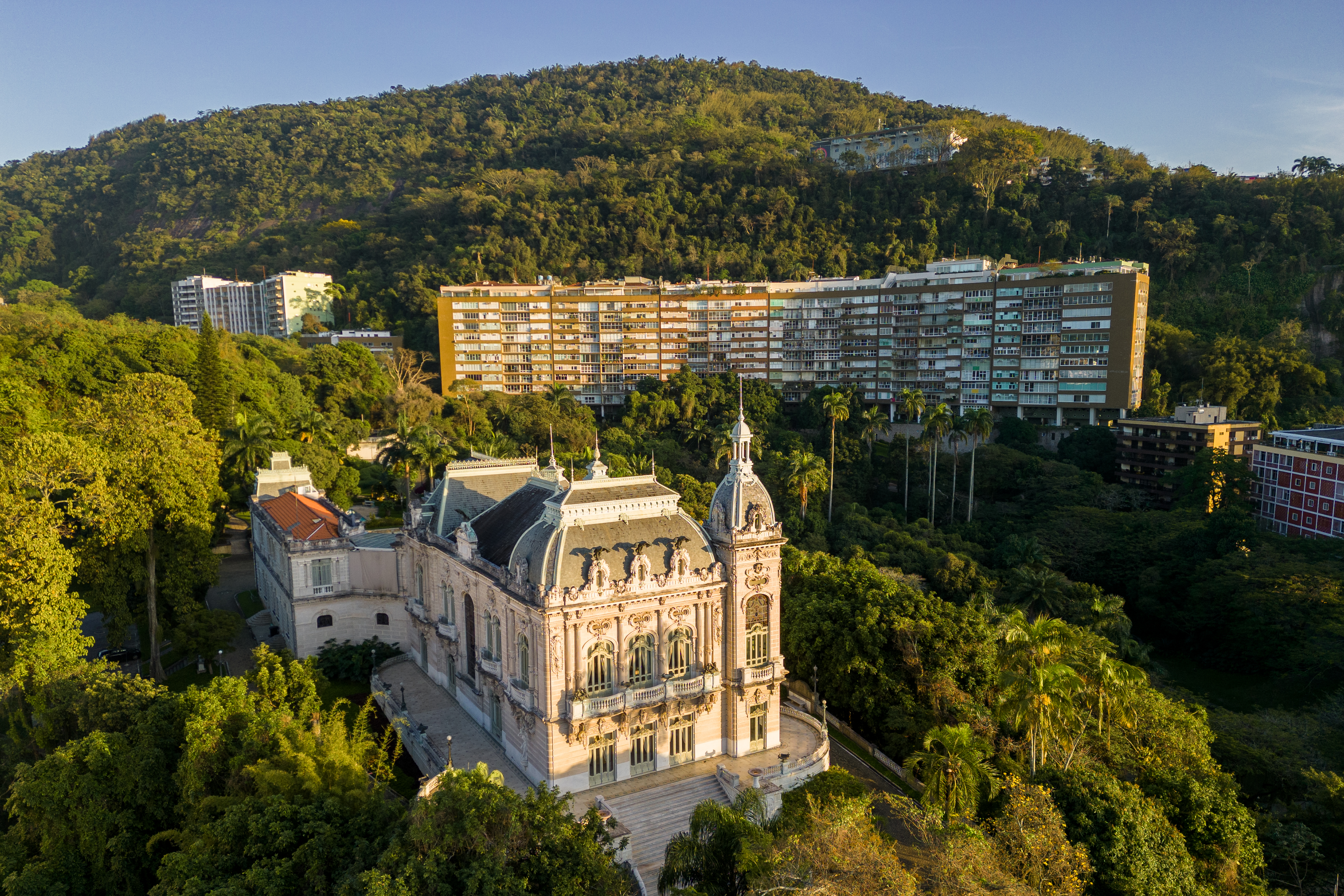
Surroundings

== See also ==
- Palácio da Alvorada
