= Bernardo Bessler =

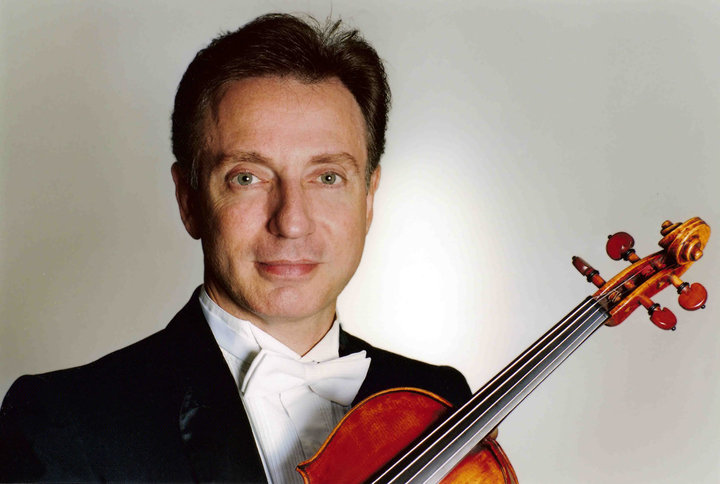
- Bernardo Bessler

Background information
- Born: May 24, 1954 (age 70); Rio de Janeiro, Brazil

Bernardo Bessler (born 24 May 1954) is a Brazilian violinist, conductor, teacher, and producer.

Bessler was born in Rio de Janeiro, Brazil. He is among the leading musicians of his country. His recordings have won for five consecutive years the Sharp Award for best classical album, highlight the New York Times among "the best of the year awards" and critics awards from the French magazines Répertoire, Le Monde and Gramophone, among others. Born in Rio de Janeiro, he began his violin studies at age five with Paulina D'Ambrosio. Later he studied with Yair Kless in Israel (Rubin Academy in Jerusalem) and with Andre Gertler in Belgium.

He plays a violin made in 1735 by Domenico Montagnana. As a producer has created dozens of series of concerts and shows with an educational basis, directed and produced music festivals across the country, and created socially relevant projects for poor communities.

He has been performing since 1985 as first violin of the Bessler (later Bessler-Reis) Quartet, notably in the recording of the string quartet compositions of Heitor Villa-Lobos.

The earlier Quarteto Bessler-Reis consisted of:

- Bernardo Bessler, first violin
- Michel Bessler, second violin
- Christine Springuel, viola
- Alceu Reis, cello

Bessler has performed in Belgium, Spain, Netherlands, France, Germany, Finland, Italy, Denmark, Bolivia, Israel, Canada, Colombia, United States and Japan. He participated in several recordings alongside dozens of the greatest popular artists of Brazilian music, especially the performances beside Tom Jobim, Caetano Veloso, Egberto Gismonti, Gilberto Gil, Gal Costa, Chico Buarque etc. and as a soloist in concerts, and DVDs with Jane Duboc, Maria Bethânia, Cassia Eller, Marisa Monte, among hundreds of others.

Bessler also recorded for tracks for movies, Brazilian soap operas, theater and ballets.
