= Danubius Quartet =

The Danubius Quartet was formed in Hungary in 1983.

Its personnel comprise the violinists Judit Tóth (formerly Mária Szabó) and Adél Miklós, violist Cecilia Bodolai (formerly Agnes Apró) and cellist Ilona Ribli, under the artistic direction of the violinist Vilmos Tátrai. The quartet won a number of awards in the earlier years of its foundation, and has recorded, among other works, the String Quartet No. 1 of Reményi for Hungaroton, the complete String Quartets of Villa-Lobos for Marco Polo and for Naxos the Mozart and Brahms Clarinet Quintets, the Boccherini Guitar Quintets and Spohr's Op. 33 String Quintets.
