= Catete Palace =

Former Brazilian presidential palace

- Palácio do Catete
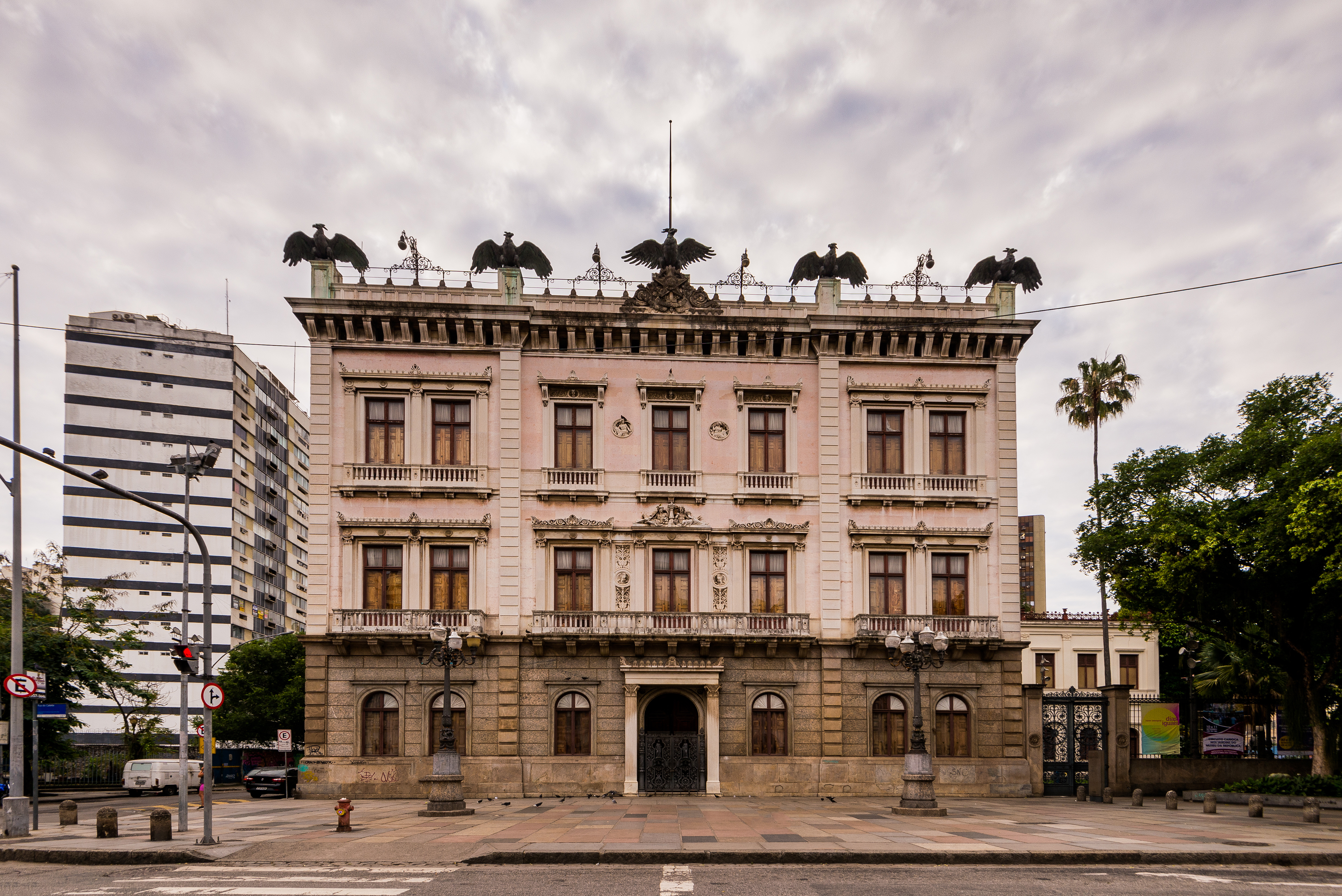
- Former Presidential Palace; now Republic Museum

- Location within Rio de Janeiro

General information
- Status: museum
- Architectural style: Neoclassical
- Location: Flamengo, Rua do Catete, 153, Rio de Janeiro, Brazil
- Coordinates: 22°55′33″S 43°10′34″W
- Current tenants: Ministry of Culture (Museu da República)
- Construction started: 1854
- Completed: 1867
- Renovated: 1883
- Client: António Clemente Pinto, Baron of Nova Friburgo
- Owner: Brazilian government

Technical details
- Floor count: 3

Design and construction
- Architect: Carl Friedrich Gustav Waehneldt

Website
- museudarepublica.org.br

National Historic Heritage of Brazil
- Designated: 1938
- Reference no.: 153

The Catete Palace (Portuguese: Palácio do Catete, IPA: [paˈlasju du kaˈtetʃi]) is an urban mansion in the Flamengo neighborhood of Rio de Janeiro, Brazil. The property stretches from Rua do Catete (Catete Street) to Praia do Flamengo (Flamengo Beach). Construction began in 1858 and ended in 1867. It was Brazil's presidential palace from 1897 to 1960, and the site of Getúlio Vargas' suicide. It now houses the Museu da República (Republic Museum) and a theatre. The Catete underground rail station is adjacent.

== History ==
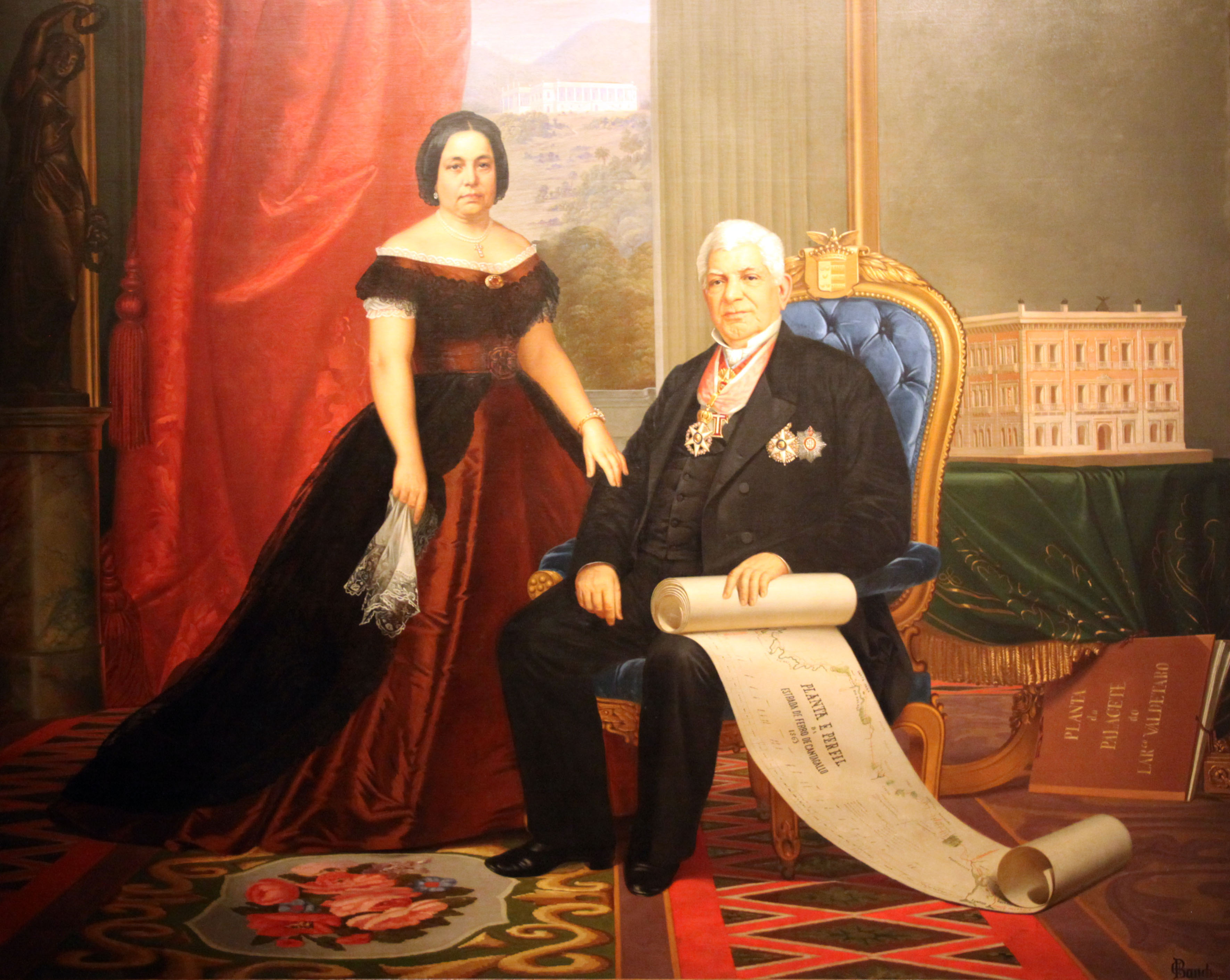
The Baron and Baroness of Nova Friburgo with a model of the Catete Palace in the background (undated)

The building was built as the residence of the family of the Portuguese-born Brazilian coffee producer António Clemente Pinto, Baron of Nova Friburgo, in the then capital of the Empire of Brazil. It was called the Palace of Largo Valdetaro and Palace of Nova Friburgo.

With the design of German architect Carl Friedrich Gustav Waehneldt, dated 1858, the work began with the demolition of the old house. The construction officially ended in 1866, but the finishing works still continued for over a decade.

After the death of the Baron and the Baroness, their son Antônio Clemente Pinto Filho, the Count of São Clemente, sold the property in 1889, shortly before the Proclamation of the Republic of Brazil, to an investor group, who founded the Companhia Grande Hotel Internacional (Grande Hotel Internacional Company). This development, however, did not succeed in turning the palace into a luxury hotel. Due to the economic crisis in the late 1880s and early 1890s (The Encilhamento), the venture went bankrupt, and its titles acquired by counselor Francisco de Paula Mayrink. Five years later, Mayrink paid off debts to the Bank of Brazil.

The seat of the executive branch of Brazil was the Itamaraty Palace in Rio de Janeiro. In 1897, President Prudente de Morais became ill and Vice President Manuel Vitorino took office as interim. He acquired the Catete Palace and over there installed the seat of government. Officially, the palace was the seat of the Federal Government from 1897 until 1960, when the capital and the Federal District were transferred to Brasília.

Various historical events happened in the palace halls, such as the death of President Afonso Pena in 1909; the signing of the declaration of war against the German Empire and its allies in 1917, during World War I; the visit and hosting of Cardinal Eugenio Pacelli, the future Pope Pius XII, in 1934; the declaration of war against the Axis in World War II in 1942; the suicide of President Getúlio Vargas in 1954, with a shot in the heart, in his bedroom on the third floor of the palace; among others.

== Gallery ==
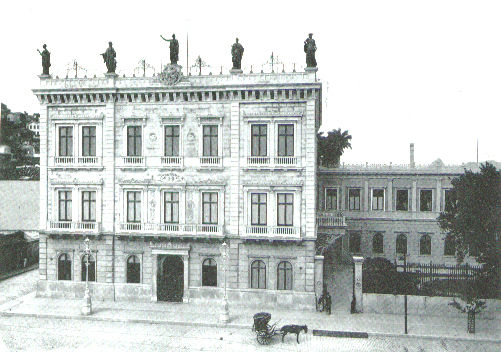
Main façade of the Catete Palace with statues of the Muses at the top, 1897.

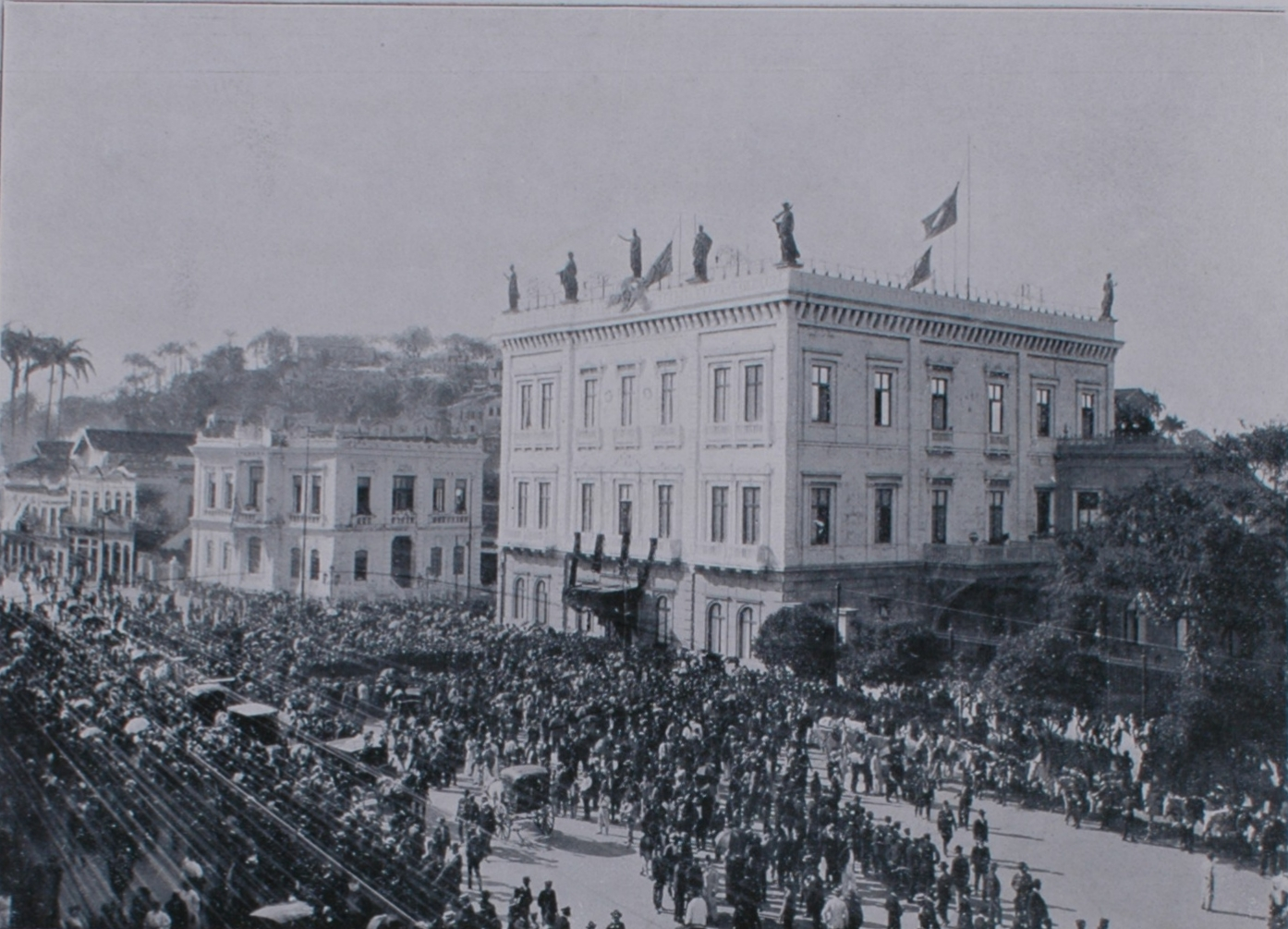
The palace during the funeral of President Afonso Pena, 15 June 1909

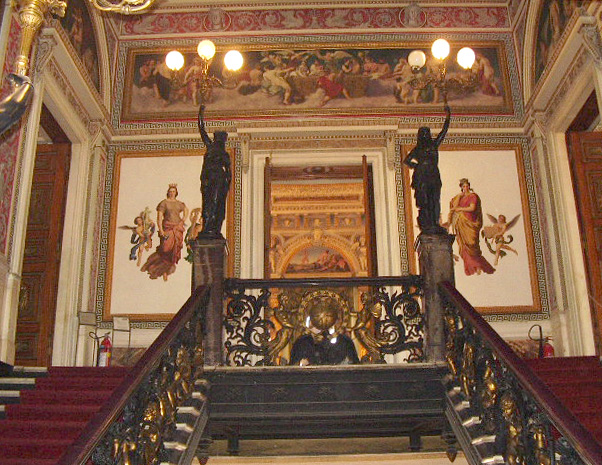
The main staircase of the former Presidential Palace

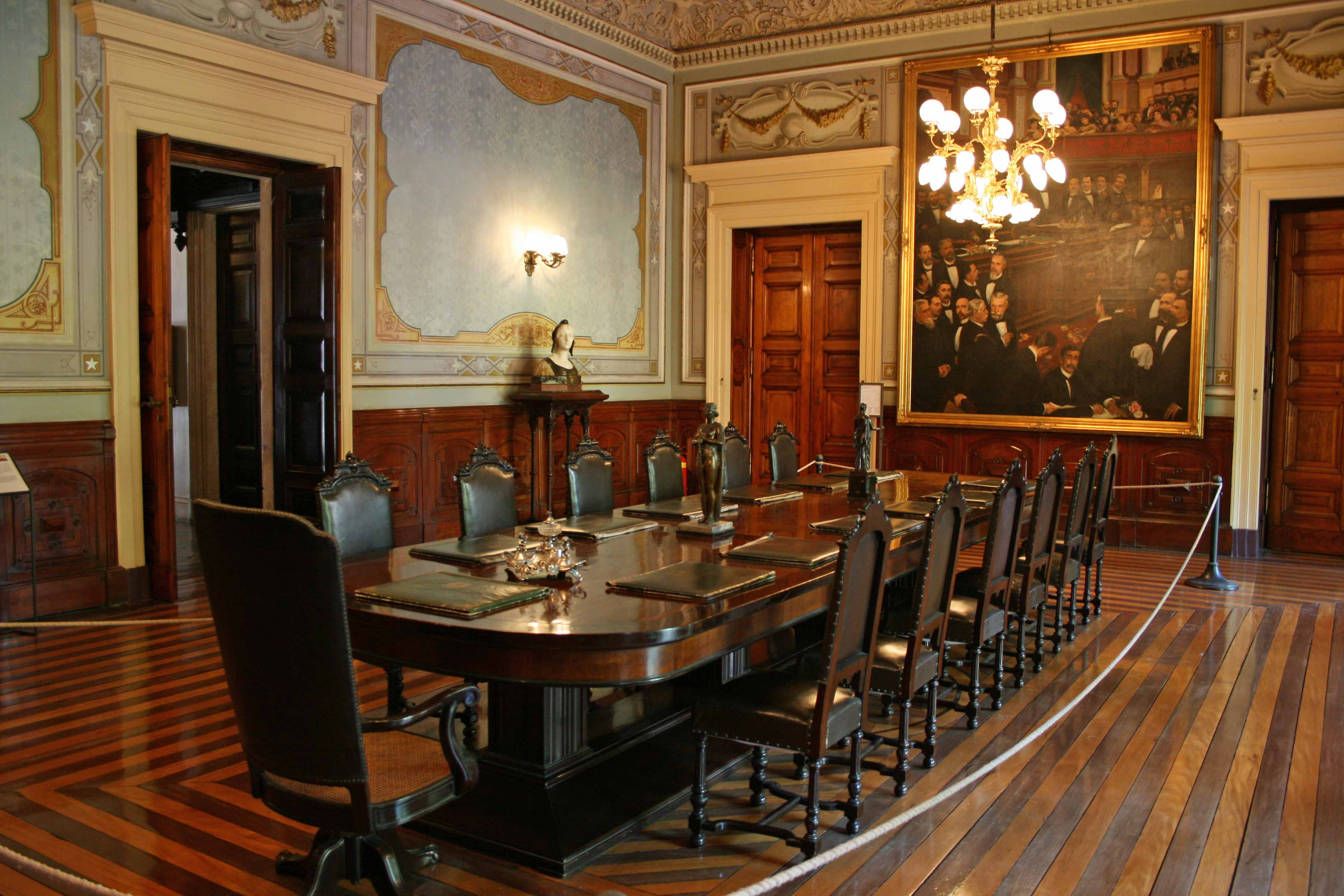
The Ministerial Room

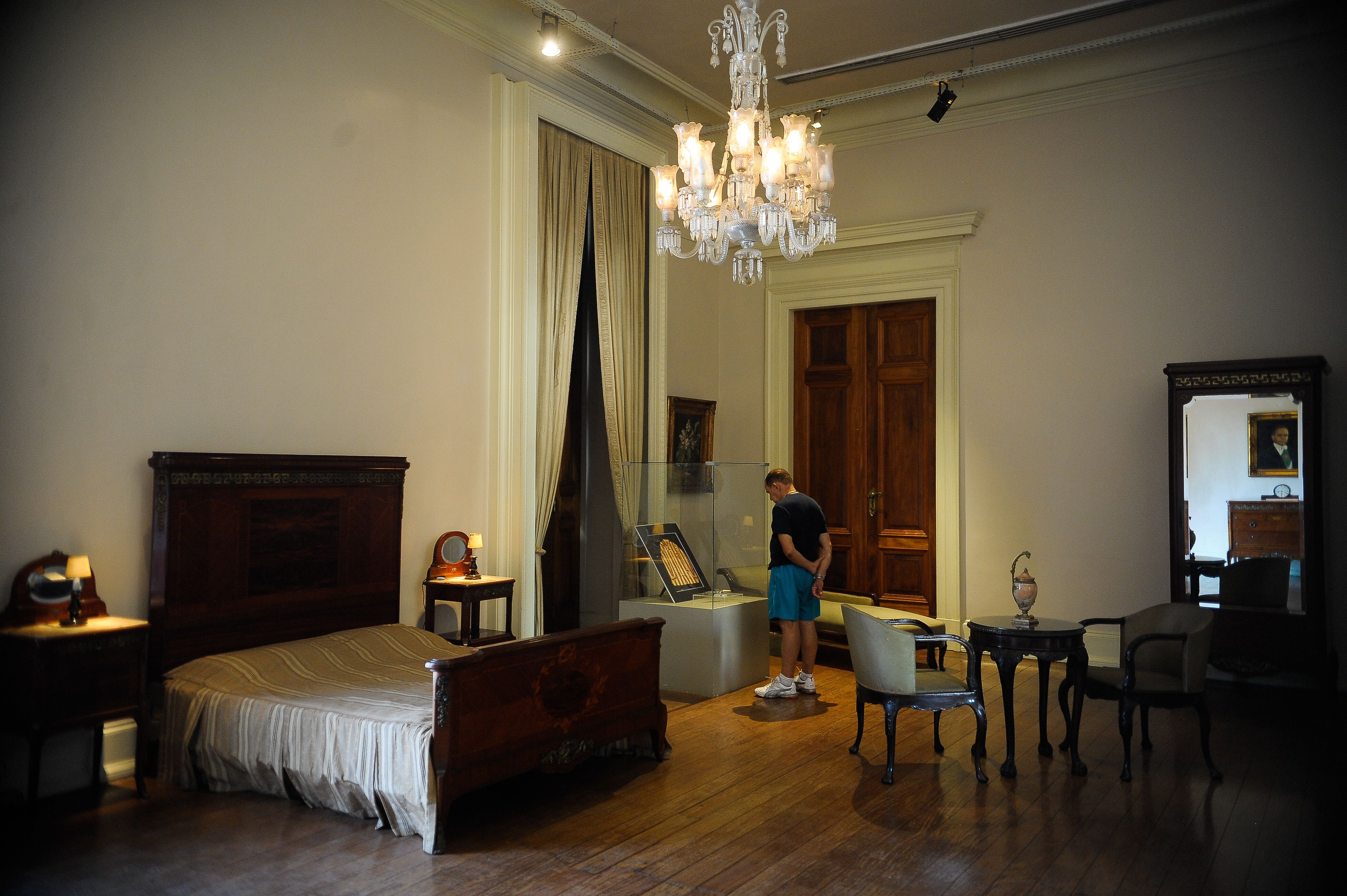
President Vargas' bedroom

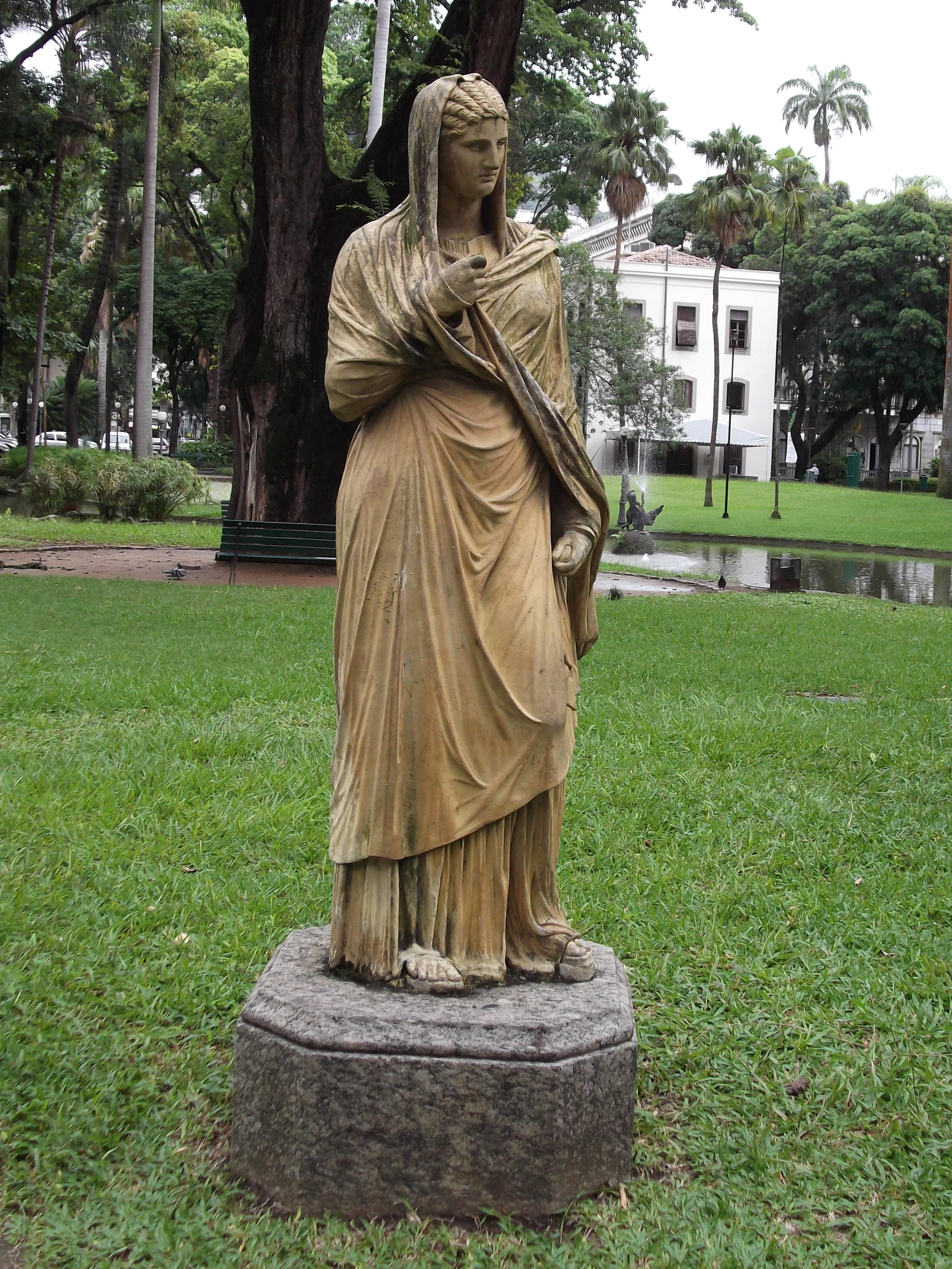
Allegorical sculpture

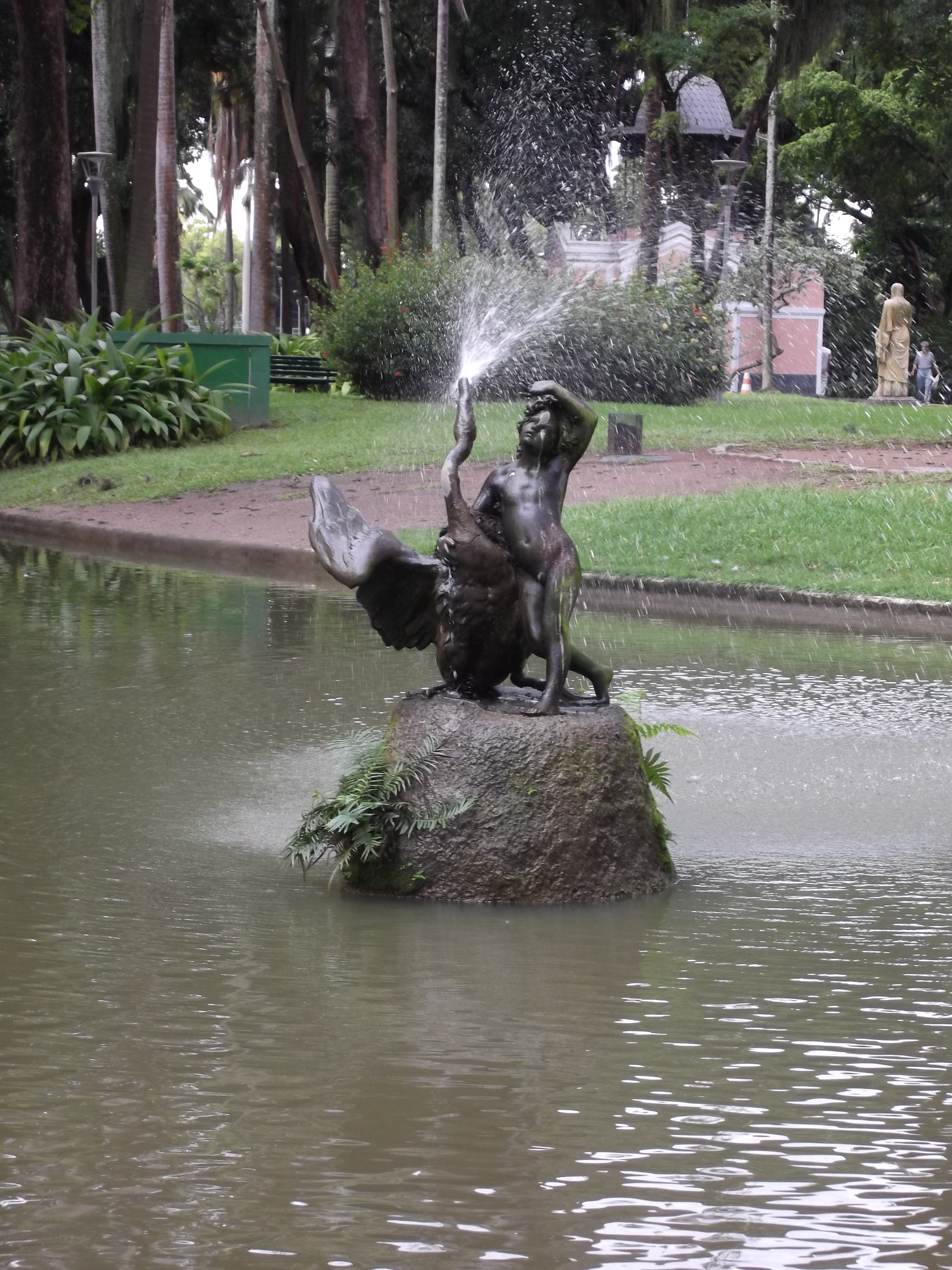
Statue on the lake

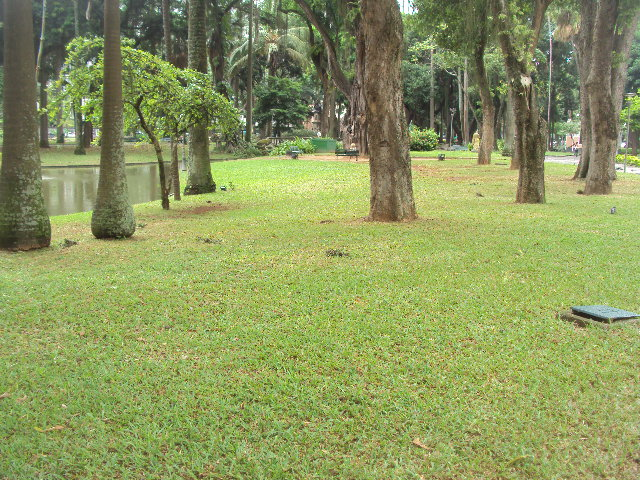
Palace grounds

== See also ==
- Catetinho
- Palácio do Planalto
- Palácio da Alvorada
