= Marilyn Duke =

Marylin Duke
- Born: Manfrey Lecta Duke; October 3, 1916; Jackson, Georgia
- Origin: Atlanta, Georgia
- Died: August 7, 1995 (aged 78) Clayton County, Georgia
- Genres: Vocal jazz, jazz blues, torch songs, swing, blues, R&B
- Occupation: Singer
- Instrument: Vocals
- Years active: 1933–1966
- Labels: Bluebird; RCA Victor
- Website: www.vaughnmonroesociety.org Vaughn Monroe Appreciation Society (Note: The Vaughn Monroe Appreciation Society was founded in 2001; its website is maintained by Louis J. Kohnen, Jr., of East Rochester, New York, and Claire Schwartz of Dearborn, Michigan)

Marilyn (Marylin) Duke (née Manfrey Lecta Duke; October 3, 1916 Jackson, Georgia – August 7, 1995 Clayton County, Georgia), was an American singer from the swing era of the mid to late 1930s and early 1940s. She began as a soloist in 1933 on radio in Atlanta, then, beginning 1936, was carried on syndicated and network radio from New York City. In the first half of the 1940s, Duke traveled and recorded as a featured singer with big bands, notably with Vaughn Monroe. She distinguished herself as a rhythm singer – that is, a singer who swings. (Note: During the swing era, most big bands featured a female and male vocalist; generally one singer primarily sang straight renditions of ballads, while the other was more of a rhythm singer, someone who swung tunes and, as was the case with Marylin Duke, sang the blues (Bebop, by Scott Yanow, Miller Freeman, Inc., 2000, pg. 172; OCLC 47008488)) And, while with the Monroe Orchestra, she was acclaimed for having an engaging personality. Duke was a tall (Note: Marylin Duke was known as the tallest female singer in the business. Published accounts state that she was 5'9". But her maternal 1st cousin, Marilyn Howell, who cared for her during her final 5 years of life, stated that she was 6 feet tall. For reference, Howell, herself, is 5'10"; Howell also said that Duke was a heavy smoker and had problems, before her stroke, with alcohol; Marilyn smoked Camel Cigarettes, the brand that Vaughn Monroe promoted beginning 1946) brunette, and, according to journalists, attractive. As for her hair color, Duke was a blonde when she re-joined Monroe's band in 1944. After her career with big bands – after 1945 – and into the late 1960s, she performed on-and-off as a nightclub pianist-singer in the metropolitan areas of Boston, New York City, and Newport, Rhode Island. Her recorded hits with Vaughn Monroe include "There'll Be Some Changes Made" and "The Trolley Song" – the latter being a late-1944, post-Petrillo-ban, rush-to-market, swing band vocal duet with Monroe. (Note: "Disking Race: Victor Pushes, Col'mbia Easy" — "Post-Ban Disks Already Spinning," November 25, 1944, pps. 13 & 63)

== Career highlights ==
=== Growing up ===
Marilyn Duke learned to sing in a choir at her church, likely the Macedonia Baptist Church in Jackson, Georgia, a suburb of Atlanta. Though, according to a 1995 interview (the year she died) in the Atlanta Constitution, at an early age, she preferred the gospel music of a nearby black church.

=== Atlanta radio career ===
In 1933, under the product brand pseudonym of "Miss Seiberling," Duke performed on broadcast radio WGST, Wednesdays, 7:15 pm. The radio name was that of the Seiberling Rubber Company, a national tire manufacturer distributed by the Brooks-Shatterly Company, Inc., of Atlanta. (Note: Brooks-Shatterly Company, Inc., was an Atlanta distributor of Seiberling Tires, automobile accessories, and hardware; the company name reflected its two key executives, Everett Clinton Shatterly (1893–1959), president, and Harry H. Brooks (né Henry Harrison Brooks; 1894–1954), secretary-treasurer) In 1934, Duke, under her birth name, Manfrey Duke, sang regularly on WSB radio in Atlanta.

=== New York radio career ===
After winning a radio audition contest around 1934, Duke headed to New York City, where, from December 30, 1934, to 1936 (and later), she sang regularly on NBC radio and the Mutual Broadcasting Company. She was billed as a blues singer and contralto. Her radio broadcasts included performances with the orchestras of Leon Brusiloff (1898–1973) and his brother Nathan Brusiloff (1904–1951) (Note: Leon Brusiloff (1898–1973), a violinist, is not the same person as Leon Brusilow (1897–1968), father of violinist, conductor, and music educator Anshel Brusilow; likewise, Nathan Brusiloff (1904–1951) — Leon Brusiloff's brother, also a violinist – is not the same person as Anshel Brusilow's brother, Nathan Brusilow (1920–2004), the late notable classical clarinetist from Philadelphia) and Paul Whiteman. In 1935, her broadcast performances were sometimes with the Charioteers, a male choral quartet. Beginning December 30, 1934, Duke sang on WOR two or three times a week – typically Tuesdays, Thursdays, and Saturdays at 5:15 pm. She sang 15-minute segments, usually. The WOR broadcasts were carried on the Mutual Network.

=== Early dance orchestra career ===
From Mid to late-1930s, Duke, as vocalist, was the star attraction for Manny Gates (né Emanuel Getzholtz; 1894–1957) Orchestra in Miami (Note: Mannie Gates (né Emanuel Getzholtz; 1894–1957) led an orchestra in Miami) She joined Jolly Coburn's (né Frank Harry Coburn; 1900–1964) (Note: Jolly Coburn (né Frank Harry Coburn; 1900–1964) grew up in Binghamton, New York; and, upon graduating from Binghamton High School in 1919, received an appointment to the U.S. Naval Academy (admission date was June 13, 1919 — Midshipman class of 1923). But he resigned January 13, 1920. (Annual Register of the United States Naval Academy; 1919–1920) He flourished as a danceband leader in the mid- to late-1930s; Coburn sometimes used the pseudonyms "Frank Ferris" and "Wally Bishop") Orchestra, a society band, around July 1937 (Note: Joseph Henabery directed a short film about "Jolly Coburn") after playing a piano stint at a Boston nightclub. Duke also sang with the Shep Fields Orchestra in 1937 (in Philadelphia).

=== Joined Vaughn Monroe's Orchestra in 1940 ===
On New Year's Eve 1940, at age twenty-four – 11 months, 2 weeks and 5 days after the death of her father – Duke debuted with the Vaughn Monroe Orchestra at the Statler Hotel Boston, eight months after Monroe founded the orchestra. Her father died January 8, 1940, of injuries as a pedestrian struck by a truck. Monroe formed his orchestra April 1940 in Miami at the urging and sponsorship of band agent Willard Alexander (1908–1984) (Note: Willard Alexander (né Willard Herman Alexander; 1908–1984) left MCA in 1937 to start a band booking division at the William Morris Agency, and ran it until 1947, when he left to form his own agency, Willard Alexander, Inc., based in New York City; he was known for having been an influential exponent of big band jazz during its heyday, and long after, until his death) and New England–based band leader Jack Marshard (né Jacob Marshard; 1910–1948), who saw an opportunity when offered two simultaneous bookings. Marshard became his manager. Marylin Duke was Monroe's first female vocalist. She had been working as a pianist-singer at a Boston nightclub; but because an infected finger interrupted her playing, she auditioned for Vaughn Monroe and was promptly signed. Her notoriety rose rapidly during her tenure with Vaughn Monroe and his Orchestra as a featured singer.

=== Departure from Vaughn Monroe's Orchestra in 1943 ===
She left the Monroe Orchestra around June 1943 to join the WAAC, but instead, continued performing, which included a two-month stint with Tommy Dorsey. That same year (1943), Duke also sang with Will Osborne and His Orchestra. Filling the void, Monroe hired Phyllis Lynne (Note: Phyllis Lynne (born 1919, Alameda, California) was a featured vocalist with Russ Morgan (1941–1943), Chico Marx (pre-cinema entertainment at the Orpheum Theatre in Los Angeles (1943); Vaughn Monroe (1943–1944), Frankie Carle (1944–1945), and Bob Crosby (1945–1946); in line with her having done screen tests in Hollywood, Lynne left Crosby late 1946 to accept a role in the musical comedy Toplitzky of Notre Dame (George Marion, Jr., book and lyrics; Sammy Fain, music) which had pre-Broadway tryout performances (beginning October 31, 1946) in Boston at the Shubert Theatre and (beginning December 2, 1946) in Philadelphia at the Forrest Theatre, then went to the New Century Theatre on Broadway, where it ran for 60 performances over 7 weeks; at some point, Lynne also was a featured vocalist with Tex Williams ... and also Freddy Martin; Lynne quit show business to raise dalmatians, but found that her hobby was so expensive that she returned to singing, joining Carl Cotner (né Carl Benjamin Cotner; 1916–1986), Gene Autry's musical director, as vocalist with his band; also in 1950, Lynne sang on ABC from San Francisco in a show called Melody Promenade, with Phil Bavero (né Philip Martin Bavero; 1908–1985) and His Orchestra; Lynne got her first job in 1939 on the West Coast as soloist with Paul Pendarvis (né Paul Plumley Pendarvis; 1907–1987) (de) — before that, Lynne was in a trio called "The Boys and a Blonde;" Lynne was blonde, blue-eyed, and 5 ft. 1/2 in. tall; Lynne received her primary and secondary education at Sarah Dix Hamlin School (founded 1863) in San Francisco (through mid-11th grade) and graduated from Beverly Hills High School around 1937; she attended UCLA for 1 year) July 31, 1943, in Los Angeles, to replace Duke. Monroe gave Lynne her East Coast debut on September 14, 1943, in New York City at the Paramount.

=== Rejoined Vaughn Monroe's Orchestra in 1944 ===
Around June 1944, Duke began a 10-week solo engagement at the Frolic Club (aka, the Frolic Theatre Restaurant), (Note: The Frolic Theatre and Restaurant operated as a bar until the Harry Della Russo (1907–1973) and Cella (James, 1892–1962; and Michael, 1895– ) families acquired it in the 1930s, turning it into a world-class entertainment complex. (Revere by William J. Craig, Arcadia Publishing, 2004; OCLC 57495324)) in Revere, Massachusetts, at 155 Revere Beach Boulevard. (Note: "In And Around Philly," June 3, 1944, pg. 13) But, apparently before finishing, she was back with Vaughn Monroe by mid-July 1944, replacing Del Parker. (Note: Del Parker (née Ida Pikus; 1921–2000), also known in her youth as Adele Ethel Pikus, and known while singing with Jimmy Dorsey as Dee Parker, had been a singer with Ed Wynn and Jimmy Dorsey; she became known as Auntie Dee, on The Auntie Dee Show, a TV show from the 1950s; she sang a year with Vaughn Monroe and two years with Jimmy Dorsey; for her professional career, she changed her surname to Parker; Parker married Phillip M. Brestoff (1909–1967) in Chicago on June 3, 1943; he was the leader of a dance orchestra that she had been singing with; Brestoff later became a radio station executive; they moved to Hollywood in 1956; In 1968, after Brestoff's death, Dee married Guy Cherney (1917–1989)) (Note: "Paramount, New York" (review), by Paul Secon, August 19, 1944, pg. 25, cols. 1 & 2) In September 1944, she married Peter O'Brien, a Boston amusement park owner.

She then permanently left the orchestra around January 1945. Yet, on April 14, 1945, Vaughn Monroe and His Orchestra featured Duke, with Bobby Ricky, in Dayton, Ohio, at the Lakeside Park Ballroom.

A large part of Vaughn Monroe's repertoire featured the singing of Monroe, himself, as well as Marilyn Duke, Ziggy Talent, (Note: Ziggy Talent (né Zigmund James Talent; 1912–1997) was a saxophonist and featured vocalist; he was from Boston) The Murphy Sisters, and The Moonmaids.

=== On and off solo career ===
In December 1945, she was performing at the Music Box in Boston.

== Popularity ==
=== Polls ===
- 1942: Billboard's "Collegiate Choice of Female Vocalists," Duke received votes for first and second choice. (Note: "Collegiate Choice of Female Vocalists," May 2, 1942, pg. 21)
- April 12, 1942: A swing magazine presented Marilyn Duke with an award during Vaughn Monroe's final performance, after a long engagement, at the Commodore Hotel in New York (Note: "On The Air; Vaughn Monroe," April 25, 1942, pg. 25)
- The February 1942 issue of Big Song Magazine, Vol. 2, No. 2 (OCLC 19509187), Vaughn Monroe, Marilyn Duke, and Sammy Kaye were on the cover.
- In January 1945, Duke's rendition of "The Trolley Song," became a top-ten hit. That song, and the one on the flip side, "The Very Thought of You," were recorded Sunday, November 12, 1944, at Victor's studio in New York, 18 hours after the 27-month Petrillo Ban had been lifted. The session represented Victor's first since the ban. Both songs were pressed and on sale only 24 hours later. Victor Victor distributed 160,000 copies throughout the country before the week was out. (Note: "Record Snatches and Catches," by Bobby Steely, The Flat Hat, Vol. 34, No. 10, December 6. 1945, pg. 3) (Note: "Trolley Song No. 1," November 18, 1944, pg. 63)

Billboard
Week; Ending	Reviewed	Record; Sales	Juke; Box	Radio; Plugs	BB; Issue	Page(s)
'"There'll Be Some Changes Made"
1941	Daniel Richman				February 15, 1941	13
"The Trolley Song"
December 9, 1944	Maurie Orodenker				December 9, 1944	21
December 7, 1944			15		December 16, 1944	19
December 14, 1944			10		December 23, 1944	19
December 21, 1944		8	9		December 30, 1944	12
December 28, 1944		4	14		January 6, 1945	20–21
January 4, 1945		4	12		January 13, 1945	18–19
January 11, 1945			12		January 20, 1945	18–19
January 18, 1945				7	January 27, 1945	16
Cashbox — "Disk-Hits Box Score" (weekly)
Week; Ending	Weekly Singles; Ratings	Artist(s)			Disc(s)
December 11, 1944	1	Pied Pipers; Vaughn Monroe			Capitol 168; Victor 20-1605
December 18, 1944	1	Pied Pipers; Judy Garland; Vaughn Monroe			Capitol 168; Decca 23361; Victor 20-1605
December 25, 1944	2	Pied Pipers; Judy Garland; Vaughn Monroe			Capitol 168; Decca 23361; Victor 20-1605
January 1, 1945	2	Pied Pipers; Vaughn Monroe; Judy Garland			Capitol 168; Victor 20-1605; Decca 23361
January 8, 1945	2	Pied Pipers; Vaughn Monroe; Judy Garland			Capitol 168; Victor 20-1605; Decca 23361
January 15, 1945	4	Vaughn Monroe; Pied Pipers; Judy Garland			Victor 20-1605; Capitol 168; Decca 23361
January 22, 1945	5	Vaughn Monroe; Pied Pipers; Judy Garland			Victor 20-1605; Capitol 168; Decca 23361
January 29, 1945	7	Vaughn Monroe; Pied Pipers; Judy Garland			Victor 20-1605; Capitol 168; Decca 23361
February 5, 1945	8	Vaughn Monroe; Pied Pipers; Judy Garland			Victor 20-1605; Capitol 168; Decca 23361
February 16, 1945	16	Vaughn Monroe; Pied Pipers; Judy Garland			Victor 20-1605; Capitol 168; Decca 23361
"The Very Thought of You"
Cashbox — "Disc-Hits Box Score" (weekly)
Week; Ending	Weekly Singles; Ratings	Artist(s)			Disc(s)
December 25, 1944	14	Ray Noble; Vaughn Monroe			Columbia 36546; Victor 20-1605
January 1, 1945	10	Ray Noble; Vaughn Monroe			Columbia 36546; Victor 20-1605
January 8, 1945	16	Ray Noble; Vaughn Monroe			Columbia 36546; Victor 20-1605

== Selected discography ==
=== Jolly Coburn and His Orchestra ===
1. "Foolin' Myself" (fox trot)
  Recorded June 24, 1937, New York City
  Jack Lawrence (w&m)
  Peter Tinturin (1910–2007) (w&m)
  (audio on YouTube)
  Jolly Coburn and His Orchestra
  Marilyn Duke (vocalist)
  Side A (matrix 11114): Bluebird B-7041-A

=== Wally Bishop (pseudonym of Jolly Coburn) and His Band ===
2. "Foolin' Myself" (fox trot)
  Recorded June 24, 1937, New York City
  Jack Lawrence (w&m)
  Peter Tinturin (1910–2007) (w&m)
  Marilyn Duke (vocalist)
  Side ? (matrix 11114): Regal Zonophone MR 2598

=== Vaughn Monroe and His Orchestra on Bluebird ===
3. "There'll Be Some Changes Made"
  Recorded January 13, 1941
  William Benton Overstreet (1888–1935) (music)
  Billy Higgins (né William Weldon Higgins; 1888–1937) (words)
  (audio on YouTube)
  Marylin Duke (vocalist)
  Bobby Nichols (né Robert J. Nichols; 1924–1975) (trumpet solo)
  Side A (matrix 060317=1): Bluebird B-11025-A
  OCLC 80421652
4. "My One Romance"
  Recorded January 13, 1941
  Olga Paul (words)
  Tschaikowsky (music)
  Helmy Kresa (arranger)
  Marylin Duke (vocalist)
  Side A (matrix 060318=1): Bluebird B-11045-A
  OCLC 244292622, 84490225
5. "Requestfully Yours"
  Recorded February 17, 1941
  Kay Werner (Kay Werner Kent) (w&m)
  Sue Werner (Sue Werner McCarthy) (w&m)
  (audio on YouTube)
  Marilyn Duke (vocalist)
  Frank Levine (alto sax solo)
  Nichols (trumpet solo)
  Side B (matrix 60650=1): Bluebird B-11070-B
  OCLC 82407821
6. "Just Plain Folks" (fox trot)
  Recorded February 17, 1941, New York City
  Tiny Hill (w&m)
  Mary Ray (w&m)
  Harold Dillon (w&m)
  Marilyn Duke (vocals)
  Side A (matrix 060652=1): Bluebird B-11085-A
  OCLC 84124275
7. "Thumbs Up" (fox trot)
  Recorded February 17, 1941, New York City
  Johnny Watson (Note: Johnny Watson (né John Kluczko; 1912–1977) (ASCAP Biographical Dictionary, 1980; OCLC 12259500)) (w&m)
  Marilyn Duke (vocals)
  Side A (matrix 060654=1): Bluebird B-11103-A
  OCLC 244442524
8. "G'Bye Now" (fox trot)
  Recorded March 31, 1941
  From the musical:
  Hellz-a-Poppin
  John S. Olsen (w&m)
  Clifford Johnson (w&m)
  Jay Levison (pseudonym of Jay Livingston) (w&m)
  Ray Evans (w&m)
  Marilyn Duke (vocalist)
  Side A (matrix 062793=1): Bluebird B-11114-A
  OCLC 62468093
9. "Music Makers"
  Recorded March 31, 1941
  Don Raye, Harry James Marilyn Duke (vocalist)
  Side B (matrix 062791=1): Bluebird B-11114-B
  OCLC 83466554
10. "Yours" ("Quieréme Mucho")
  Recorded April 21, 1941, New York City
  Jack Sher (English words)
  Agustin Rodriguez (Spanish words)
  Gonzalo Roig (music)
  (audio on YouTube)
  Marilyn Duke (vocalist)
  Side B: (matrix 063796=1): Bluebird B-11146-B
  OCLC 83668038
11. "Aurora"
  Recorded April 21, 1941, New York City
  Roberto Roberti
  Mário Lago (pt)
  English lyrics by Harold Adamson
  Spanish lyrics by Pedro Berriós
  Marilyn Duke (vocalist)
  The Bostonians (vocalists)
  Side A: (matrix 063795=1): Bluebird B-11160-A
12. "The Monkey on a String"
  Recorded April 21, 1941, New York City
  (audio on YouTube)
  Marilyn Duke (vocalist)
  Side B: (matrix 063794=2): Bluebird B-11160-B
13. "Love Me As I Am"
  Recorded May 19, 1941
  From the Paramount film:
  Caught in the Draft
  Marilyn Duke (vocalist)
  Side B (matrix 065630=2): Bluebird B-11173-B
  OCLC 78131897
14. "Daddy" (fox trot)
  Recorded May 19, 1941
  Robert W. Troup, Jr. (w&m)
  Marilyn Duke (vocalist)
  Side A (matrix 065626=1): Bluebird B-11189-A
  OCLC 80737103
15. "The Worm Who Loved The Little 'Tater-Bug'" (fox Trot)
  Recorded June 16, 1941
  Len Charles Conn (w&m)
  Marilyn Duke (vocalist)
  Side B (matrix 066109=1): Bluebird B-11207-B
  OCLC 81442242
16. "Love Me A Little" (fox trot)
  Recorded June 30, 1941
  Herbie Holmes (w&m)
  Howard Smith (w&m)
  Ellen Orr (pseudonym of Harry DeCosta) (Note: Harry DeCosta (né Harry Milton DeCosta; 1885–1964) (ASCAP Biographical Dictionary, 1980; OCLC 12259500)) (w&m)
  (audio on YouTube)
  Marilyn Duke (vocal refrain)
  Side A (066433=1): Bluebird B-11221-A
  OCLC 259959977, 83120490
17. "One, Two, Three O'Lairy"
  Recorded August 15, 1941
  Don Reid (Note: Don Reid (né Donald Reid; born 1915) (ASCAP Biographical Dictionary, 1980; OCLC 12259500)) (w&m)
  Max Chamiton (w&m)
  (Oh! My! Whoa! Mary!) (fox trot)
  (audio on YouTube)
  Marilyn Duke (vocalist)
  Vaughn Monroe (vocalist)
  Arnold Ross (1921–2000) (piano solo) (Note: Arnold Ross (ne Arnold Rosenberg; 1921–2000) was a prolific jazz pianist, organist, and arranger, and studio musician (ASCAP Biographical Dictionary, 1980; OCLC 12259500))
  Side A (067581=1): Bluebird B-11283-A
  OCLC 261400802
18. "The Window Washer Man"
  Recorded September 2, 1941
  Hugo Malanga (words)
  Marion Barry (music)
  (audio on YouTube)
  Ziggy Talent Marilyn Duke (vocalist)
  Side B (matrix 067734=1): Bluebird B-11303-B
  OCLC 725171423
19. "I Got It Bad and That Ain't Good"
  Recorded September 2, 1941
  From the 1941 musical revue:
  Jump For Joy
  Paul Webster (words)
  Duke Ellington (music)
  Marilyn Duke (vocalist)
  Side A (matrix 067732=1): Bluebird B-11310-A
  OCLC 62472084, 83383595, 83495336
20. "I Don't Want To Walk Without You"
  Recorded November 24, 1941
  From the 1942 film:
  Sweater Girl
  Frank Loesser (words)
  Jule Styne (music)
  Marilyn Duke (vocalist)
  Side A (matrix 068349=1): Bluebird B-11399-A
  OCLC 30434697, 876052838, 81829120 and OCLC 77990320
21. "Tica Ti-Tica Ta" (fox trot)
  Recorded November 24, 1941
  Louis Prima (w&m)
  (audio on YouTube)
  Marilyn Duke (vocalist)
  Ziggy Talent (vocalist)
  Chorus (vocals)
  Side B (matrix 068348=1): Bluebird B-11433-B
  OCLC 77611884
22. "Pretty Little Busybody"
  Recorded December 18, 1941
  Al Lewis (w&m)
  Larry Stock (w&m)
  Vincent Rose (w&m)
  Marilyn Duke (vocalist)
  Jack Fay (bassist and vocalist) Side B (matrix 068679=1): Bluebird B-11422-B
  OCLC 78456361
23. "Honey Dear" (fox trot)
  Recorded January 15, 1942, New York City
  Floyd Hunt, Lester Melrose (w&m)
  (audio on YouTube)
  Marilyn Duke (vocalist)
  Bobby Nichols (né Robert J. Nichols; 1924–1975) (trumpet solo)
  Side B (matrix 068886=1): Bluebird B-11454-B
  OCLC 79121196
24. "Somebody Nobody Loves" (fox trot)
  Recorded January 15, 1942, New York City
  Gus Kahn (w&m)
  George Hamilton (w&m)
  Marilyn Duke (vocalist)
  Side A (matrix 068885=1): Bluebird B-11445-A
  OCLC 255971938, 78182412
25. "My Little Cousin" (fox trot)
  Recorded February 24, 1942
  Yiddish version:
  Abe Schwartz (music)
  Hyman Prizant (1892–1947) (words)
  American swing version:
  Herbert ("Happy") Lewis
  Sam Braverman (1898–1960) (Note: Sam Braverman (né Sam William Braverman; 1898–1960) was a Russian-born American musician-songwriter and tenor from Rochester, New York; in the mid- to late 1920s, he sang on WHAM radio, and, from 1919 to 1959, he was associated with Neisner Bros., Inc., namely as head buyer of sheet music and records ("Braverman Dies at 61,", Billboard, April 18, 1960))
  Cy Coben
  Marilyn Duke (vocalist)
  Side A (matrix 071959=1): Bluebird B-11488-A
  OCLC 77820128

=== Vaughn Monroe and His Orchestra on Victor ===
Bluebird Records is a sub-label of RCA Victor. During the WWII years (and the recording ban), Victor reissued hundreds of jazz records from its Bluebird library. After World War II, the Bluebird label was retired and its artists were re-issued on the RCA Victor label.

26. "Requestfully Yours"
  Recorded February 17, 1941
  Kay Werner (Kay Werner Kent) (w&m)
  Sue Werner (Sue Werner McCarthy) (w&m)
  (audio on YouTube)
  Marilyn Duke (vocalist)
  Side B: Victor 20-2825-B
  OCLC 83385963
27. "G'Bye Now" (fox trot)
  Recorded March 31, 1941
  From the musical:
  Hellz-a-Poppin
  John S. Olsen (w&m)
  Clifford Johnson (w&m)
  Jay Levison (pseudonym of Jay Livingston) (w&m)
  Ray Evans (w&m)
  Marilyn Duke (vocalist)
  Re-issue
  Side B (matrix 062793=1): Victor 20-2644-B
  OCLC 14980059, 79337900
28. "Yours" ("Quieréme Mucho") (fox trot)
  Recorded April 21, 1941, New York City
  Jack Sher (English words)
  Agustin Rodriguez (Spanish words)
  Gonzalo Roig (music)
  (audio on YouTube)
  Marilyn Duke (vocalist)
  Side A: Victor 20-2984-A
  OCLC 174525696
29. "Doodle La Do Da" (fox trot)
  Recorded September 30, 1941
  John D. Watson (w&m)
  Marilyn Duke and chorus (vocals)
  Side B (matrix 071430=2): Victor 27892-B
  OCLC 900226181
30. "All I Need Is You" (fox trot)
  Recorded April 7, 1942
  Peter De Rose (w&m)
  Benny Davis (w&m)
  Mitchell Parish (w&m)
  Vaughn Monroe (trumpet); George "Spots" Esposito, Irving Goodman, Jack Hansen (trumpets); Ray Conniff, Art Dedrick, Ray Heath (trombones); Andrew Bagni (né Andrew Joseph Bagni; 1907–1984), Roy Anderson (alto saxes), Frank Levine, Johnny Turnbull, Ziggy Talent (tenor saxes); Arnold Ross (piano, arranger); Carmen Mastren (guitar), Jack Fay (bass); Harry Yaeger (drums), Marilyn Duke, Four Vees (vocals); Jimmy Mundy (arranger)
  Side A (matrix 073816=1): Victor 27910-A
  OCLC 900226262, 80793993
31. "You Were Never Lovelier"
  Recorded July 17, 1942
  From the 1942 film:
  You Were Never Lovelier
  Johnny Mercer (words)
  Jerome Kern (music)
  Marilyn Duke, Four Lee Sisters (vocals)
  (matrix: 075433=1): Victor 27958
  OCLC 900226334

27-month Petrillo Recording Ban
Began July 31, 1941
Ended November 11, 1944

32. "Happy-Go-Lucky" (1943)
  Used in the 1943 film:
  Happy Go Lucky
  Frank Loesser (words)
  Jimmy McHugh (words)
  Marilyn Duke (vocalist)
  Side B: Victor 20-1524-B
  OCLC 839934304
33. "How Blue The Night"
  Recorded around 1944
  Harold Adamson (words)
  Jimmy McHugh (music)
  (female vocalist uncredited)
  (likely Marilyn Duke)
34. "The Very Thought of You"
  Recorded November 12, 1944
  Victor Studios, New York City
  Released November 13, 1944
  From the 1944 film:
  The Very Thought of You
  Ray Noble (w&m)
  Marilyn Duke (vocalist)
  Side A: Victor 20-1605-A
  OCLC 62472718
35. "The Trolley Song" (fox trot) (1944)
  Recorded November 12, 1944
  Victor Studios, New York City
  From the 1944 M-G-M film:
  Meet Me in St. Louis
  Hugh Martin and Ralph Blane (w&m)
  (audio on YouTube)
  Vaughn Monroe and Marilyn Duke (vocal duet)
  Side B: Victor 20-1605-B
  OCLC 62472718

== Selected radio transcriptions ==
1. WOR's Dedication of the Fifty Kilowatt Transmitter, in Newark March 4, 1935, 8:00 pm
  A variety program from Carnegie Hall, as WOR, increases its power output to fifty-thousand watts
  Bert Lahr, Borrah Minevitch and the Harmonica Rascals, Deems Taylor (host), Eddie Dowling, Edward Bowes, Ethel Merman, Fannie Hurst, Gabriel Heatter, Harry Hershfield, Jack Pearl, Jan Peerce, Jean Goldkette, Lanny Ross, Pat Padgett (1898–1990), Pick Malone (né Andrew Pickens Maloney; 1893–1962), Ray Bolger, Sugar Kane (11-year-old "Sweetheart of the air"), the Charioteers, the Pickens Sisters, Victor Moore, Wee Willie Robine (William Robyn; 1894–1996), Tiny Ruffner (1899–1983), Harry Salter (1898–1984) (conductor), Harlan Eugene Reid, Gene Buck (President of ASCAP), Jack R. Poppele (1898–1986) (Chief Engineer of WOR), The WOR Orchestra, Fie Dudley, William Gaxton, Frances Williams, Mischa Violin (1899–1984), Monsignor LaVelle (né Michael Joseph Lavelle; 1856–1939), Jack Arthur (né Arthur E. Campbell; 1900–1980), The Hometown Boys, Alfred McCosker (1886–1959) (president of WOR), Eddie Brown (1895–1974) (violinist), (Note: Eddy Brown (1895–1974) had been a child prodigy violinist who, as a child, studied with Leopold Auer) Elsie Janis, Goeta Jungberg, George Schackley (WOR, musical director), Ben Bernie, The WOR Piano Quintet, John Gambling (does a satire of his gym-class program), Sandra Svenska, Joseph Weber (president of the American Federation of Musicians), The Moonbeams, Marilyn Duke, The Song Weavers, Jan Peerce
2. Broadcast
  Coca Cola Spotlight Bands
  Vaughn Monroe and His Orchestra
  Longacre Theatre, New York City
  January 13, 1942, 10:15 to 10:30 pm
  WOR: Mutual Broadcasting System
  Track 3: "Tica Ti-Tica Ta"
  Louis Prima (w&m)
  Marilyn Duke (vocalist)
  Gil Newsome (né Gilbert L. Newsome; 1916–1965) (announcer)
  OCLC 733771043, 407835965
3. Broadcast: Commodore Hotel, New York
  Opening Night: Vaughn Monroe and His Orchestra
  September 28, 1944
  Star Line SLC61105 (released 1987)
  Marilyn Duke (vocalist)
  Track 3: "Ten Days With Baby"
  From the 1944 film, Sweet and Low-Down
  Mack Gordon (words)
  James V. Monaco (music)
  Track 5: "I'm Makin Believe"
  From the 1944 film, Sweet and Low-Down
  Mack Gordon (words)
  James V. Monaco (music)
  OCLC 21730065
4. "Every Day of My Life" (1943–1944)
  Harry James (w&m)
  Billy Hays (né William Silas Hays; 1898–1972) (w&m)
  Morty Berk (né Marx Berkowitz; 1896–1955) (w&m)
  "Ten Days With Baby"
  From the 1944 film, Sweet and Low-Down
  Mack Gordon (words)
  James V. Monaco (music)
  Recorded at Liederkranz Hall, New York, July 10, 1944
  Marilyn Duke (vocalist)
  Lang-Worth transcription
  Circle CCD116
  OCLC 37209934

== Selected live performances ==
- April 14, 1943: Coca-Cola Victory Parade of Spotlight Bands (over 168 stations on the Blue Network), broadcast from MacArthur Stadium, Syracuse; Duke and Dick Shanahan (drummer) were featured guests with Will Osborne and His Hollywood Band.

== Selected compositions ==
1. "Darling I'm Dreaming of You"
  Marilyn Duke (w&m)
  E unpublished 175318
  Miami Beach, Florida: Jack Reynolds (Note: Jack B. Reynolds (born 1904) was a pianist at a hotel in Miami Beach owned by James Henry Brennan (1878–1960) (ASCAP Biographical Dictionary, 1980; OCLC 12259500))
  1st copy August 29, 1938

== Family ==
Parents

Manfrey Lecta Duke was born to William Franklin Duke, Jr. (1874–1940), and Gussie Mae Vaughn (maiden; 1895–1961) — William Duke's second of two wives. Gussie, after the death of William Franklin Vaughn, married John Richardson. Manfrey Duke had 2 brothers and 1 sister. She also had 2 half-sisters and 1 half-brother from her father's first marriage to Margaret L ("Maggie") Scarbrough (maiden; 1874–1910).

Husbands

Peter O'Brien

Sometime around the fall of 1944, Marylin Duke married Peter O'Brien, who – according to a syndicated press announcement of their marriage – was a Boston amusement park magnate. They adopted two sons, Michael and Patrick. Their marriage ended in divorce.

Benjamin Cushing Bowker

Marylin Duke was known as Manfred L. Bowker when she died August 7, 1995, in Clayton County, Georgia. She had been residing in Fayetteville, Fayette County, Georgia. She was the widow of Benjamin Cushing Bowker (1912–1968), a native of Quincy, Massachusetts, who died in an auto accident in Jackson County, Georgia. At the time of his death, they were residents of Dorchester, Massachusetts. Bowker was a 1933 alumnus of Harvard and 1934 alumnus of Boston Teachers College; early in his career, Bowker had been a journalist from Boston. He later worked in corporate public relations. Darren Bowker (born 1974), a grandson of Benjamin Bowker and Joan C. Valentas (1913–1979), Benjamin's first wife, is a winemaker with Serenity Vineyards in Penn Yan, in the Finger Lakes region of New York.

Death

Duke suffered a stroke in 1990 and was treated at Grady Memorial Hospital, Atlanta. Her maternal 1st cousin, Marilyn Jean Howell (née Vaughn), cared for her until her death August 7, 1995. Duke is buried in Crest Lawn Memorial Park, Atlanta, in the family plot of her maternal Aunt Clara Belle Tarrant (née Vaughn; 1899–1982)

== Images ==
- Marilyn Duke and Matty Principal at the Moulin Rouge Hotel, Las Vegas, June 5, 1955 (12 days after the hotel's official grand opening)

Original source: Nevada State Museum, Las Vegas, Jay Florian Mitchell (1900–1984) Photo Collection
Collection: The African American Experience in Las Vegas, UNLV Libraries

UNLV Libraries, Digital Collections: Images
LoC	OHR N°	Image N°
VR-410
VR-400-A	405	299-01
VR-400-B	406	299-02
VR-419
VR-400-F	414	300-01
VR-400-G	415	300-02

== Monroe personnel who worked with Duke ==
- Four V's (aka Four Vees), male quartet culled from the band
- 1942-194?: Four Lee Sisters (formerly known as Le Ahn Sisters), Jean, Miriam, Virginia, and Maree:

Jean
(née Jean Ahn; born 1918) left in 1944 to get married
Miriam
née Miriam Florence Ahn; January 27, 1920 Girard, Ohio – February 15, 1994 Chatsworth, California, married Francis Wendell Gross (1917–2001) in the Actors Chapel, Manhattan, New York City, June 16, 1946, and subsequently moved to the British-American Compound in Iran, where Gross was a warrant officer affiliated with the United States Foreign Service.
Virginia
(née Virginia Annabell Ahn; September 13, 1921 Delaware County, Ohio – January 23, 1986 Ventura County, California) eloped with John Weigel New Year's Eve 1944; They divorced in the mid-1960s; she then married Holcombe; after singing with the Four Lee Sisters, she sang with the Moonmaids, then spent a year with the Andrews Sisters, filling-in for Maxene Andrews; John Weigel was the founder of Weigel Broadcasting; The late Tim Weigel, a son, was a notable sportscaster; Rafer Weigel, a grandson (Tim's son), is a news anchor in St. Louis for KTVI Fox 2, Jenniffer Weigel, a granddaughter (Tim's daughter), is a Chicago-based TV personality

Virginia is buried at Rio Verde Memorial Gardens in Rio Verde, Arizona, where Maree's husband John Egers is buried

Maree
(aka Mary or Marie, née Maree L. Ahn; April 11, 1924 Delaware County, Ohio – 2016) currently one hundred and two years old, from Bellevue, Ohio, had been a singer with the Lee Sisters performing with Horace Heidt (beginning in 1940), Ted Lewis, Monroe, then as soloist with Dick Rogers (1912–1970), (Note: Dick "Stinky" Rogers (aka Dick Robertson; 1912–1970), not to be confused with Richard Rodgers, was a lyricist, vocalist, comedian, band leader, and pianist. He had been a pianist and vocalist with Will Osborne; Osborne gave up his band to go to Hollywood in the latter part of 1940, Rogers took over as leader and continued its high musical quality through 1945, thanks in part to fine arrangements by Jerry Bittick (né Gerald R. Bittick); Stan Getz, at age 15, made his professional debut with Dick Rogers at the Roseland Ballroom in December 1942, and shortly after getting his AFM Local 802 union card on January 14, 1943, a truant officer yanked him off the job; meanwhile also in 1942, Osborne formed a new big band, and, in 1946, recorded for the Black & White Records, featuring vocalist Eileen Wilson, then disbanded after his last return to the Edgewater Beach Hotel in Chicago in 1948; Rogers, as lyricist, and Earle Hagen, as composer, wrote "Harlem Nocturne," which, as an instrumental, became a jazz standard ("Rogers, Dick," ASCAP Biographical Dictionary, 1980; OCLC 12259500) ("Getz, Stanley 'Stan' (1927–1991)", The Later Swing Era, 1942 to 1955, by Lawrence McClellan, Jr. Greenwood Press (2004), pg. 210; OCLC 60590895) ("Stanley Getz," Inside Jazz, reprint of Inside Be-Bop, by Leonard Feather, Da Capo Press (1977), pg. 83; OCLC 3002272)) then with the Norton Sisters, then, after the Moonmaids (who replaced the Norton Sisters) had been working with Monroe, she joined the Moonmaids, turning it into a quintet. In addition to her ensemble roles, she had been Monroe's lead singer. Soon after two Moonmaid singers left to get married, the quintet became a quartet again, with Maree Lee filling the third spot, replacing Katie Myatt, and June Hiett filling the fourth. Lee left Monroe's band on December 20, 1952, to get married; and on December 21, 1952, she married Warren Edward Grafe (1921–1973); she also had been married to George William Eger, Jr. (1918–2002)

Maree is the co-author with Robert H. Mason of Verde Valley Lore (1997), a history of Verde Valley, Arizona

- 1942–194?: Ziggy Talent (1912–1997)

=== Miscellaneous ===
- Vaughn Monroe became the host for a radio show sponsored by Camel Cigarettes. Beginning July 1942, Monroe and his Orchestra aired 30 minutes, Monday's, at 8:30, Eastern time, on CBS Radio from the Rhodes Ballroom, Providence, Rhode Island. According to Marilyn Jean Howell (née Vaughn) — Marilyn Duke's maternal 1st cousin who cared for her during the last five years of her life – Duke was a chain smoker of Camel Cigarettes.
