= You Can't Ration Love =

1944 film

- Theatrical release poster
- Directed by: Lester Fuller
- Screenplay by: Val Burton; Hal Fimberg
- Story by: Muriel Roy Bolton
- Produced by: Walter MacEwen
- Starring: Betty Jane Rhodes; Johnnie Johnston; Marjorie Weaver; Johnnie Davis; Marie Wilson; Bill Edwards
- Cinematography: Stuart Thompson
- Edited by: Thomas Neff
- Music by: Werner R. Heymann
- Production company: Paramount Pictures
- Distributed by: Paramount Pictures
- Release date: February 28, 1944
- Running time: 78 minutes
- Country: United States
- Language: English

You Can't Ration Love is a 1944 American comedy film directed by Lester Fuller and written by Val Burton and Hal Fimberg. The film stars Betty Jane Rhodes, Johnnie Johnston, Marjorie Weaver, Johnnie Davis, Marie Wilson and Bill Edwards. The film was released on February 28, 1944, by Paramount Pictures.

== Cast ==
- Betty Jane Rhodes as Betty Hammond
- Johnnie Johnston as John 'Two Point' Simpson
- Marjorie Weaver as Marian Douglas
- Johnnie Davis as Kewpie
- Marie Wilson as Bubbles Keenan
- Bill Edwards as Pete Allen
- Roland Dupree as Pickles
- Christine Forsythe as Christine
- Alfonso D'Artega as Orchestra Leader
