= Astrophysical plasma =

Plasma outside of the Solar System

Lagoon Nebula is a large, low-density cloud of partially ionized gas.

Astrophysical plasma is plasma outside of the Solar System. It is studied as part of astrophysics and is commonly observed in space. The accepted view of scientists is that much of the baryonic matter in the universe exists in this state.

When matter becomes sufficiently hot and energetic, it becomes ionized and forms a plasma. This process breaks matter into its constituent particles which includes negatively charged electrons and positively charged ions. These electrically charged particles are susceptible to influences by local electromagnetic fields. This includes strong fields generated by stars, and weak fields which exist in star forming regions, in interstellar space, and in intergalactic space. Similarly, electric fields are observed in some stellar astrophysical phenomena.

Astrophysical plasma is often differentiated from space plasma, which typically refers to the plasma of the Sun, the solar wind, and the ionospheres and magnetospheres of the Earth and other planets.

== Terminology ==
Although gas and plasma are distinct states of matter, the term gas is frequently used by astronomers to refer to any astrophysical fluid that is in either the gas or plasma state of matter. The term ionized gas specifically refers to plasma.

== Observing and studying astrophysical plasma ==
Plasmas in stars can both generate and interact with magnetic fields, resulting in a variety of dynamic astrophysical phenomena. These phenomena are sometimes observed in spectra due to the Zeeman effect. Other forms of astrophysical plasmas can be influenced by preexisting weak magnetic fields, whose interactions may only be determined directly by polarimetry or other indirect methods. In particular, the intergalactic medium, the interstellar medium, the interplanetary medium and stellar winds consist of diffuse plasmas.

== Possible related phenomena ==
Scientists are interested in active galactic nuclei because such astrophysical plasmas could be directly related to the plasmas studied in laboratories. Many of these phenomena seemingly exhibit an array of complex magnetohydrodynamic behaviors, such as turbulence and instabilities.

In Big Bang cosmology, the entire universe was in a plasma state prior to recombination.

== Early history ==
Norwegian explorer and physicist Kristian Birkeland predicted that space is filled with plasma. He wrote in 1913:

It seems to be a natural consequence of our points of view to assume that the whole of space is filled with electrons and flying electric ions of all kinds. We have assumed that each stellar system through its evolution throws off electric corpuscles into space.

Birkeland assumed that most of the mass in the universe should be found in "empty" space.

== In popular culture ==
The 1959 album Space Songs contains the song Why Does the Sun Shine?, which incorrectly refers to the Sun as "a mass of incandescent gas." In 1993, They Might Be Giants released a cover version of this song in an EP entitled Why Does the Sun Shine? (The Sun Is a Mass of Incandescent Gas). The album Here Comes Science was released by They Might be Giants in 2009. Here Comes Science includes a recording of this song immediately followed by the song Why Does the Sun Really Shine? (The Sun is a Miasma of Incandescent Plasma) that correctly refers to the Sun as plasma.
