= Billboard year-end top singles of 1947 =

Ranking of recorded music

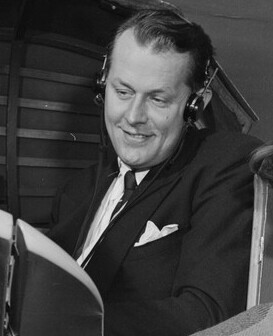
Vaughn Monroe had four songs on the top singles list, the most of any artist in 1947.

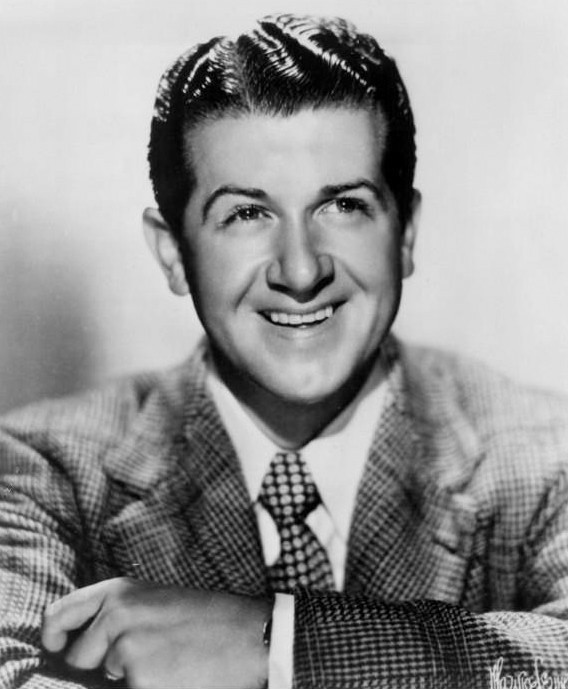
Eddy Howard had three songs on the top singles list.

This is a list of Billboard magazine's top popular songs of 1947 according to retail sales.

No. (Rank)	Title	Artist(s)
1 (1)	"Near You"	Francis Craig
2 (2)	"Peg o' My Heart"	The Harmonicats
3 (3)	"Heartaches"	Ted Weems
4 (4)	"Linda"	Ray Noble Orchestra and Buddy Clark
4 (5)	"Smoke! Smoke! Smoke! (That Cigarette)"	Tex Williams
5 (6)	"I Wish I Didn't Love You So"	Vaughn Monroe
6 (7)	"Peg o' My Heart"	The Three Suns
7 (8)	"The Anniversary Song"	Al Jolson
8 (9)	"Near You"	Larry Green Orchestra
9 (10)	"That's My Desire"	Sammy Kaye
10 (11)	"Ballerina"	Vaughn Monroe
11 (12)	"Managua, Nicaragua"	Freddy Martin
11 (12)	"Mam'selle"	Art Lund
12 (14)	"Chi-Baba, Chi-Baba (My Bambino Go to Sleep)"	Perry Como
12 (14)	"Temptation (Tim-Tayshun)"	Red Ingle and The Natural Seven and Jo Stafford
13 (16)	"I Wonder Who's Kissing Her Now"	Ted Weems and Perry Como
14 (17)	"Near You"	The Andrews Sisters
15 (18)	"The Old Lamp-Lighter"	Sammy Kaye
16 (19)	"When You Were Sweet Sixteen"	Perry Como
17 (20)	"How Soon"	Jack Owens and Eddie Ballantine
18 (21)	"Too Fat Polka"	Arthur Godfrey
19 (22)	"I Wonder, I Wonder, I Wonder"	Eddy Howard
19 (22)	"My Adobe Hacienda"	Eddy Howard
20 (24)	"Huggin' and Chalkin'"	Hoagy Carmichael
21 (25)	"(I Love You) For Sentimental Reasons"	King Cole Trio
21 (26)	"Ole Buttermilk Sky"	Hoagy Carmichael
22 (27)	"Mam'selle"	Dick Haymes
22 (27)	"You Do"	Vaughn Monroe
23 (29)	"The Anniversary Song"	Guy Lombardo
24 (30)	"The Anniversary Song"	Dinah Shore
24 (30)	"White Christmas"	Bing Crosby
25 (32)	"Across the Alley from the Alamo"	The Mills Brothers
26 (33)	"Civilization"	Danny Kaye and The Andrews Sisters with Vic Schoen
27 (34)	"The Old Lamp-Lighter"	Kay Kyser
28 (35)	"Open the Door, Richard!"	Count Basie
28 (35)	"Peg o' My Heart"	Art Lund
28 (35)	"You Do"	Margaret Whiting with Frank De Vol
29 (38)	"Feudin' and Fightin'"	Dorothy Shay
30 (39)	"Linda"	Charlie Spivak
31 (40)	"The Anniversary Song"	Tex Beneke with the Glenn Miller Orchestra
31 (40)	"Managua, Nicaragua"	Guy Lombardo
32 (42)	"How Soon"	Vaughn Monroe
32 (42)	"The Whiffenpoof Song"	Bing Crosby with Fred Waring
33 (44)	"Open the Door, Richard!"	Dusty Fletcher
34 (45)	"(I Love You) For Sentimental Reasons"	Eddy Howard
35 (46)	"Golden Earrings"	Peggy Lee with Dave Barbour
35 (46)	"Ole Buttermilk Sky"	Kay Kyser

== See also ==
- 1947 in music
- List of Billboard number-one singles of 1947
