= I Wish I Didn't Love You So =

1947 hit song

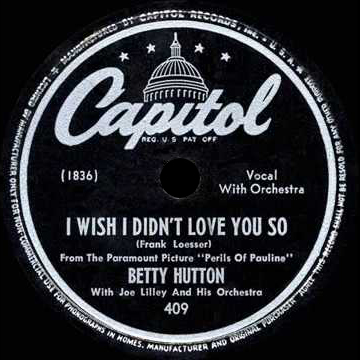
- Cover for the original Betty Hutton version

Single by Vaughn Monroe and His Orchestra and the Moon Maids
- A-side: "Tallahassee"; "How Soon"
- Released: April 1947
- Genre: Traditional pop; jazz
- Length: 2:45
- Label: RCA Victor
- Songwriter: Frank Loesser

Vaughn Monroe singles chronology
| "The Things We Did Last Summer" (1946) | "I Wish I Didn't Love You So" (1947) | "Kokomo, Indiana" (1947) |

Betty Hutton singles chronology
| "Poppa, Don't Preach to Me" (1947) | "I Wish I Didn't Love You So" (1947) | "(Where Are You?) Now That I Need You" (1949) |

"I Wish I Didn't Love You So" is a 1947 song written by Frank Loesser. It was originally performed by Betty Hutton for the 1947 Paramount Pictures film The Perils of Pauline, and was made famous by Vaughn Monroe and His Orchestra, who reached number 2 with the song in the United States, and number 1 in Canada.

The song is about how the narrator wishes he did not love his significant other, whose affection to him is "torture," and he wants to move on with someone else, but can not, because "something in [his] heart says no."

== Betty Hutton original ==
Hutton's version, backed by Joe Lilley, was nominated for Best Original Song at the 20th Academy Awards, losing to "Zip-a-Dee-Doo-Dah" by James Baskett. It was negatively reviewed by Billboard, as an "unfortunate attempt at ballad styling [that] should serve to discourage future desires for sweet warbling," while Cashbox called it "sensational and beautiful," "of the kind that romancers love to get up close to," and "one of the biggest events of the year."

Hutton's version charted on Billboard's Best Sellers in Stores chart for four weeks, peaking at number 6.

== Vaughn Monroe version ==
As previously mentioned, the biggest-selling version of the song was performed by Vaughn Monroe. Billboard highlighted the "characteristic chants" of the song, and called it "Vaughn's best singing chore in many a moon," while Cashbox called it a "beautiful romantic ballad, good for dancing."

Monroe's version charted for fifteen weeks on Billboard's Best Sellers in Stores chart, and peaked at number two, blocked by Francis Craig's "Near You". It was also the only version of the song to close out Billboard's year-end list for 1947, which it did at number five.

== Notable versions ==
- Amy Irving and Steve Earle in 2025
- Andrea Marcovicci in 2004
- Aretha Franklin in 1964 for Soft and Beautiful
- Bill Watrous & Carl Fontana in 1984
- Bing Crosby & the Andrews Sisters
- Bobby Hatfield in 1969
- Dick Farney
- Dick Haymes, whose version reached number 9 on the Best Sellers list.
- Dinah Shore, whose version reached number 8 on the Best Sellers list.
- Dinah Washington in 1960
- Eddy Arnold, recorded in the mid-to-late-60s
- Etta Jones in 1961 for So Warm
- Frankie Carle in 1950
- Frank Sinatra
- Four Freshmen in 1959 for Love Lost
- George Chisholm in 1968
- Hazel Scott in 1957
- Helen Forrest
- Jimmy Scott in 1962
- K.d. lang in 1988 for Shadowland
- Larry Birdsong & Jimmy Beck in 1959
- Lina Nyberg & Esbjörn Svensson in 1993
- Liz Callaway in 1993
- Marvin Gaye, originally in 1973 for Let's Get It On, but scrapped and re-recorded in 1977 for the posthumously released 1997 album Vulnerable
- Mel Carter in 1965
- Nancy Wilson in 1966 for Nancy – Naturally
- Peggy Lee in 1961 for If You Go
- Ray Conniff Singers in 1961 for So Much in Love
- Rebecca Kilgore & Dave Frishberg in 2008
- Seth MacFarlane in 2015 for No One Ever Tells You
- Shirley Horn in 1987 for I Thought About You
- Steve Conway and His Orchestra
- Steven Pasquale in 2009
- Sunny Gale
- Tab Hunter in 1958
- Tim McCarver in 2009
- Usko Kemppi in 1954
- Willie Nelson in 2013 for Let's Face the Music and Dance
