= Tom Glazer =

American folk singer and songwriter (1914–2003)

- Born: Thomas Zachariah Glazer; September 2, 1914; Philadelphia, Pennsylvania, United States
- Died: February 21, 2003 (aged 88) Rochester, New York, United States
- Occupation: Singer-songwriter
- Labels: Young People's Records (1940s), Kapp Records (1960s)

Thomas Zachariah Glazer (September 2, 1914 – February 21, 2003) was an American folk singer and songwriter known as a composer of ballads, including "Because All Men Are Brothers", recorded by The Weavers and Peter, Paul and Mary; "Talking Inflation Blues", recorded by Bob Dylan; "The Ballad of FDR" and "A Dollar Ain't A Dollar Anymore". He wrote the lyrics to the songs "Melody of Love" (1954), and "Skokian" (1954). He is perhaps best remembered as the writer of the classic children’s song “On Top of Spaghetti.”

== Life ==
Thomas Zachariah Glazer was born in Philadelphia on September 2, 1914, to Russian Jewish émigré parents from Minsk. His father, a carpenter in a shipyard, died during the 1918 flu pandemic, and Glazer was brought up by a series of relatives before being placed in the Hebrew Orphan Home in Philadelphia with his two brothers; his younger brother Sidney Glazier became a producer, most notably of Mel Brooks's The Producers. Their father's record collection influenced Glazer musically, and at school he learned to play the tuba, guitar and bass. At 17, he hitchhiked to New York, where he took night courses to complete his education while working at Macy's during the day. He subsequently attended City College of New York for three years.

Glazer moved to Washington, D.C., and began work at the Library of Congress. There he met Alan Lomax who worked for cataloging American folk songs, and who was a great influence. Glazer began performing as an amateur and was invited by Eleanor Roosevelt to perform at the White House for soldiers working there as guards. He made a successful professional début at The Town Hall, New York City, in January 1943 during a blizzard, and in 1945 had a radio show Tom Glazer's Ballad Box. His songs of the period, such as "A Dollar Ain't a Dollar Anymore", "Our Fight is Yours", "When the Country is Broke", and "Talking Inflation Blues" took strong social stands. Glazer's songs were recorded by Bob Dylan, Pete Seeger, Burl Ives, The Kingston Trio, Peter, Paul and Mary, Perry Como and Frank Sinatra. He was part of the strong folk music scene in New York in the 1940s, and with Lead Belly, Woody Guthrie, Pete Seeger and Josh White helped prepare for the commercially successful folk revival of the 1960s. "He wasn't fancy," Seeger reported after his death "He was just straightforward. He had a good sense of humor."

Glazer was married to Miriam Reed Eisenberg with whom he had two sons. The marriage ended in divorce in 1974.

Glazer recorded a number of children's records in the late 1940s and early 1950s with Young People's Records, Inc. In the 1960s he hosted a weekly children's show on WQXR radio in New York.

== Cinema ==
Glazer wrote the musical score for the Elia Kazan film A Face in the Crowd (1957). Glazer also wrote and sang the title song in the 1966 movie Namu, the Killer Whale starring Robert Lansing and Lee Meriwether.

== Children's songs ==
Glazer, with Dottie Evans, recorded three children's records in 1959 and 1960 that were part of a six-album set known as Ballads for the Age of Science. They contained songs intended to explain science concepts for young children, all of which were written by Hy Zaret (lyrics) and Lou Singer (music). One of these albums, Space Songs, included the song "Why Does the Sun Shine?" which was later covered by They Might Be Giants.

His greatest commercial success came with his original 1963 recording of the song parody "On Top of Spaghetti" to the tune of "On Top of Old Smoky", which he recorded for Kapp Records with the Do-Re-Mi Children's Chorus. The song was later included on an LP record that also included such numbers as one of the first cover versions of "Puff, the Magic Dragon", as well as "Battle Hymn of the Children" and other children's songs.

Glazer became ambivalent towards his creation, saying that "I'm standing in line before the Pearly Gates in the musicians' line, in which I stand last. When I'm asked what have I done in music and I say I wrote 'On Top of Spaghetti', I'm told, "Sorry, buster, you can't enter." In 2008, Smithsonian Folkways released Tom Glazer Sings Honk-Hiss-Tweet-GGGGGGGGGG and Other Children's Favorites, a collection of Glazer's live performances.

His work with Young Peoples Records, a subscription service that delivered vinyl 78 RPM records to subscribers about every six weeks, included: "Building a City", "The Circus Comes to Town", "The Men Who Come to Our House", "The Little Fireman", "On a Rainy Day", "Muffet in the City", "When I Grow Up", "Let's Play Zoo", "Going West: A Group of American Pioneer Songs", "Hooray! Today is Your Birthday", "When the Sun Shines Again", "The Little Gray Ponies", "Who Wants a Ride?", "The Chugging Freight Engine", "Everyday we Grow I-O", "Daniel Boone", and "Come to the Fair".

== Other hits ==
Glazer also adapted a German folk song, "Ich bin ein Musikante", into "The Musicians" (also known as "I Am a Fine Musician"), memorably performed in two episodes of The Dick Van Dyke Show.

== Death ==
Glazer died at his home in Rochester, New York on February 21, 2003, at the age of 88.

== See also ==
- Songs for Victory: Music for Political Action with the Union Boys (1944)
