= There I Go (1940 song) =

Single by Vaughn Monroe and his Orchestra

from the album Bluebird
- B-side: "Whatever Happened to You"
- Released: 1940
- Genre: Pop
- Label: Bluebird
- Songwriters: Hy Zaret, Irving Weiser

Vaughn Monroe and his Orchestra singles chronology
"There I Go"	"So You're the One"

"There I Go" is a song written by Hy Zaret and Irving Weiser. Recorded in 1940 by Vaughn Monroe and his Orchestra, it was a hit on the Billboard charts. The song was also recorded in 1941 by Will Bradley and his Orchestra.
