= Dick Farney =

Brazilian jazz pianist (1921–1987)

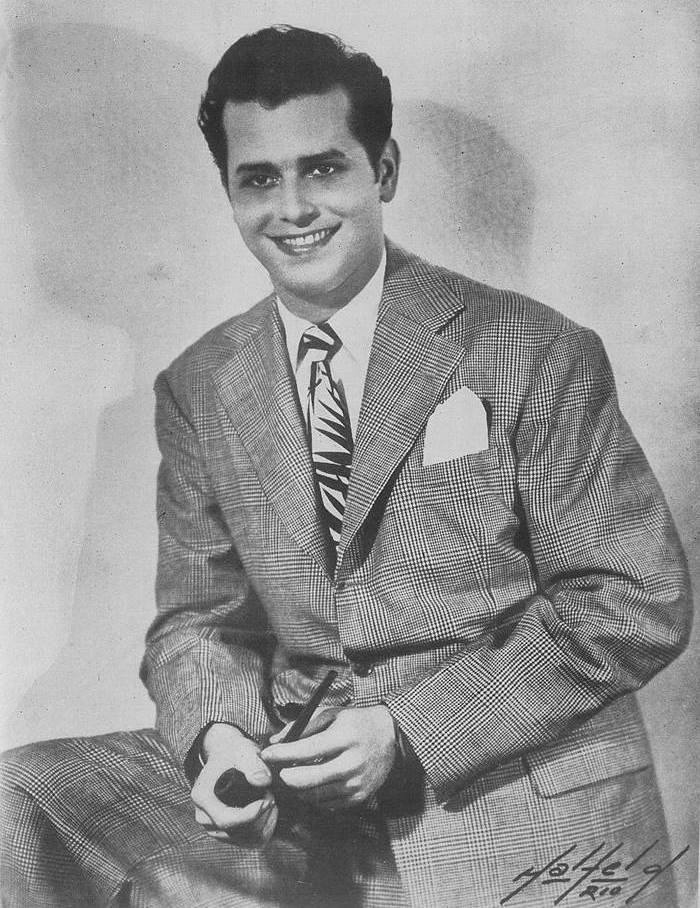
- Farney in 1947

Background information
- Born: 14 November 1921; Rio de Janeiro, Brazil
- Died: 4 August 1987 (aged 65) São Paulo, Brazil
- Genres: Bossa nova; Samba-canção; Jazz
- Instrument: Piano
- Years active: 1937–1987

Farnésio Dutra e Silva (14 November 1921 – 4 August 1987), better known as Dick Farney, was a Brazilian jazz pianist, composer, and singer who was popular in Brazil from the late 1940s to the mid-1970s and 1980s.

== Biography ==
He began playing piano as a child, as his father Eduardo Dutra taught him classical music and his mother taught him how to sing. In 1937, he debuted as a singer on the show Hora Juvenil of Radio Cruzeiro do Sul in Rio de Janeiro, performing the song "Deep Purple" composed by Peter DeRose. Farney was invited by César Ladeira to Radio Mayrink Veiga to host the program Dick Farney, the Voice and Piano. He then formed the group Os Swing Maniacos with his brother Cyll Farney on drums. The band accompanied Edu da Gaita for the recording of "Indian Song" by Nikolai Rimsky-Korsakov. From 1941 to 1944, Farney sang with the orchestra of Carlos Machado at the Casino da Urca when gambling was still allowed in Brazil.

In 1946, he was invited to the United States after meeting the arranger Bill Hitchcock and pianist Eddy Duchin at the Copacabana Palace Hotel. In November 1947, Farney had a Billboard chart hit with the song "I Wish I Didn't Love You So", which reached number 13. In 1947 and 1948, he appeared on many radio shows for NBC, particularly as a singer with The Milton Berle Show. In 1948, he performed at Vogue, a nightclub in Rio de Janeiro. In 1959 he had his own TV program, The Dick Farney Show, which was aired by TV Record Channel 7 in São Paulo. During the following year, he formed Dick Farney and His Orchestra and played at many events. In 1965, he hosted the Dick and Betty Show with Betty Faria on the newly created TV Globo Channel 4, Rio de Janeiro.

Farney was the owner of the nightclubs Farney's and Farney's Inn, both in São Paulo. He formed a trio with Sabá in 1971. From 1973 to 1978, he played piano and sang at the nightclub Chez Régine in Rio.

== Discography ==
- 1944 - "The Music Stopped" (fox) / "Mairzy doats" (fox-trot) - with the Ferreira Filho Orchestra - Gravadora Continental
- 1944 - "What's new?" (fox-trot) - crooner do conjunto Milionários
- 1944 - "San Fernando Valley" / "I love you"
- 1944 - "I don't want to walk without you"
- 1945 - "This love of mine" / "The man I love"
- 1946 - "Copacabana"/ "Barqueiro do rio São Francisco" - with Eduardo Patané
- 1946 - "Era ela" / "Ela foi embora"
- 1947 - "Worth Duckin'" (parody of the "Duckworth Chant", on A side of V-Disc 799, with Leroy "Slam" Stewart on bass and scat-singing)
- 1947 - "Just an Old Love of Mine" (Peggy Lee/Dave Barbour) / "For Once in My Life" (Fisher/Segal) with Paul Baron and his Orchestra
- 1947 - "Marina" / "Foi e não voltou"
- 1947 - "A Gal in Calico" / "For sentimental reasons"
- 1948 - "Ser ou não ser" / "Um cantinho e você"
- 1948 - "Meu Rio de Janeiro" / "A saudade mata a gente"
- 1948 - "Esquece" / "Somos dois..."
- 1949 - "Ponto final" / "Olhos tentadores"
- 1949 - "Junto de mim" / "Sempre teu"
- 1950 - "Não tem solução" / "Lembrança do passado - gravadora Sinter"
- 1951 - "Uma loira" / "Meu erro"
- 1951 - "Canção do vaqueiro" / "Nick Bar"
- 1952 - "Mundo distante" / "Não sei a razão"
- 1952 - "Luar sobre a Guanabara" / "Fim de romance"
- 1952 - "Sem esse céu" / "Alguém como tu"
- 1953 - "Perdido de amor" / "Meu sonho"
- 1953 - "Nova ilusão" / "João Sebastião Bach"
- 1953 - "April in Paris" / "All the things you are"
- 1953 - "Speak low" / "You keep coming back like a song"
- 1954 - "Copacabana" / "My melancholy baby"
- 1954 - "Tenderly" / "How Soon" - Majestic Records
- 1954 - "Somebody loves me" / "There's no sweeter word than sweetheart"
- 1954 - "Marina" / "For once in your life"
- 1954 - "Grande verdade" / "Você se lembra?"
- 1954 - "Outra vez" / "Canção do mar"
- 1954 - "Tereza da praia" / "Casinha pequenina" - with Lúcio Alves
- 1954 - Música romântica com Dick Farney
- 1954 - Sinfonia do Rio de Janeiro
- 1955 - A saudade mata a gente
- 1955 - "Foi você" / "Tudo isto é amor"
- 1955 - Dick Farney e seu Quinteto
- 1955 - "Bem querer" / "Sem amor nada se tem"
- 1955 - Dick Farney on Broadway
- 1956 - Jingle bells/White Christmas/Feliz Natal
- 1956 - Jazz Festival
- 1956 - Jazz after midnight
- 1956 - Meia-noite em Copacabana com Dick Farney
- 1956 - Dick Farney Trio
- 1957 - "Un argentino en Brasil" / "Nem fala meu nome"
- 1957 - "O ranchinho e você" / "Só eu sei"
- 1957 - "Toada de amor" / "O luar e eu..."
- 1959 - "Este seu olhar" / "Se é por falta de adeus"
- 1959 - "Esquecendo você" / "Amor sem adeus"
- 1959 - Atendendo a pedidos
- 1960 - Dick Farney em canções para a noite de meu bem
- 1960 - Dick Farney e seu jazz moderno no auditório de O Globo
- 1960 - Dick Farney no Waldorf
- 1961 - "Somos dois" / "Uma loura"
- 1961 - Dick Farney Jazz
- 1961 - Dick Farney Show
- 1961 - Jam Session
- 1962 - Dick Farney apresenta sua orquestra no auditório de O Globo - featuring Leny Andrade
- 1965 - Meia-noite em Copacabana
- 1967 - Dick Farney, piano e Orquestra Gaya
- 1972 - Penumbra e romance
- 1973 - Dick Farney
- 1973 - Concerto de Jazz ao vivo
- 1974 - Dick Farney e você
- 1974 - Um piano ao cair da tarde
- 1975 - Um piano ao cair da tarde II
- 1976 - Dick Farney
- 1976 - Tudo isso é amor - with Claudette Soares
- 1977 - Cinco anos de jazz
- 1978 - Dick Farney
- 1978 - Tudo isso é amor II
- 1979 - Dick Farney: o cantor, o pianista, o diretor de orquestra - série Retrospecto - gravadora RGE
- 1981 - Noite
- 1983 - Feliz de amor
- 1985 - Momentos
- 1987 - Dick Farney "ao vivo" (Arte do espetáculo)
