= The Perils of Pauline (1947 film) =

1947 film

- Theatrical release poster
- Directed by: George Marshall
- Screenplay by: P.J. Wolfson; Frank Butler
- Produced by: Sol C. Siegel
- Starring: Betty Hutton; John Lund; William Demarest
- Cinematography: Ray Rennahan
- Edited by: Arthur P. Schmidt
- Music by: Robert Emmett Dolan
- Production company: Paramount Pictures
- Distributed by: Paramount Pictures
- Release date: July 4, 1947
- Running time: 96 minutes
- Country: United States
- Language: English
- Box office: $3.8 million (US rentals)

PLAY full film; runtime 01:32:30

The Perils of Pauline is a 1947 American Technicolor musical comedy film directed by George Marshall and starring Betty Hutton, John Lund and William Demarest. It was produced and released by Paramount Pictures.

Although named after the 1914 film serial of the same name, it is not a remake of it. Rather, it is a fictionalized account of the rise to fame of silent film actress Pearl White, the star of the original serial.

A broad satire of silent-film production, the film is a musical-comedy vehicle for Hutton, who stars as White. The original songs by Frank Loesser include the standard "I Wish I Didn't Love You So", which received an Academy Award nomination for Best Original Song. Paul Panzer, who played the villain in the 1914 Perils of Pauline, has a very small part in this film, as do silent-comedy veterans Chester Conklin, Hank Mann, Snub Pollard, and James Finlayson.

The film is in the public domain today; all public-domain video releases are sourced from 16 mm television prints that have faded over the years. Universal Studios (through NBC Universal Television, successor-in-interest to EMKA, Ltd.) owns the original film elements.

== Plot ==
Pearl White is a frustrated garment worker who aspires to become a dramatic actress, although she really shines at singing and bantering with audiences. (Shoved on stage to do or die, she throws the tomatoes back at the hecklers.) She joins a touring theatrical troupe owned and managed by handsome but pompous Mike Farrington. Veteran actress Miss Julia Gibbs takes Pearl under her wing, as does Timmy Timmons, another member of the troupe. Farrington starts her off by putting her in charge of costumes and giving her walk-ons. Unable to suppress her natural rambunctiousness on stage, Pearl resorts to tying her hands together under an apron. Mike and Pearl fall in love, but neither confesses it. In a South Sea melodrama, Pearl is drenched with cold water, and shivers and sneezes so badly that she can't speak. Farrington berates and insults her; Pearl reads him the riot act and walks out. Julia follows her.

Pearl auditions for Julia's agents, singing "I Wish I Didn't Love You So." They like her, but there is no business in summer. The agent offers Julia a "grande dame" role in a "flicker." Julia scorns film actors, but her agent points out, "They always eat!"

At the studio, several pictures are being filmed at once. With no advance warning, Julia is barraged with pies. Furious, Pearl storms onto the set and retaliates, then helps her friend walk through several works in progress, shooing a lion out of the way. (She thought it was a dog.) The director, George "Mac" McGuire, offers her a $100 a week contract. "She's gonna be the biggest thing in pictures!" he declares. Pearl soon becomes world-famous as the star of the cliffhanging, tied-to-the-railroad-tracks serials known as The Perils of Pauline. Meanwhile, Farrington can't get work; the theaters are showing pictures.

Pearl is filming a pursuit alongside a train. She jumps onto a boxcar and meets a hobo: It's Timmy, who promptly joins Pearl's team as a villain. Later, Timmy finds Mike working as a barker in a sideshow. He tells Mike his new boss has a job for him. It is, of course, Pearl, who persuades him to become her leading man. His first lesson is that the kind of melodramatic gestures that he abhorred in Pearl are exactly what is needed in silent film. They are a success.

McGuire arranges a publicity stunt that sends Pearl and Mike off in a runaway balloon—without the balloonist who was supposed to sneak into the basket. The balloon is caught in a thunderstorm and they cling to each other. He tells her he loves her and promises to marry her.

The press announcement sidelines Mike, who feels he has lost his identity. His pride can't take it and he calls off the wedding. Then War is declared. Mike and Timmy join the Army; Pearl does benefits and makes war films. After the war ends, Mike comes home to find great success in the theater. Serials are on their way out, and Pearl and Timmy go to Paris to perform in a nightclub there. Farrington can't follow her until his play is over.

After 251 performance at the Casino de Paris, Pearl learns that Mike is coming. Elated, she falls during a stunt. The doctors tell her that she must have surgery immediately; even so, it might be one or two years before she can walk again. Instead, she goes to meet Mike. He begs her to marry him and come back to America. When she says she won't leave Paris, he replies that he will come to her. She tells him she doesn't love him anymore. Julia has followed them, and when Mike gets out of the car she beckons to him. A sorrowful Pearl gets Timmy to take her into a theater showing one of their films. Eyes on the screen, she hears Mike's voice saying, "You always were a rotten actress." They embrace, and he carries her out of the theater.

== Cast ==
- Betty Hutton as Pearl White
- John Lund as Michael Farrington
- Billy De Wolfe as Mr. Timmy Timmons
- William Demarest as George "Mac" McGuire
- Constance Collier as Julia Gibbs
- Frank Faylen as Mr. Joe Gurt
- William Farnum as Western Saloon Set Hero
- Chester Conklin as Comic Chef
- Paul Panzer as Drawing Room Gent (Panzer was the villain in the original serial)
- "Snub" Pollard as Western Saloon Set Propman
- James Finlayson as Comic Chef
- Creighton Hale as Marcelled Leading Man (Hale was the male lead in the original serial)
- Hank Mann as Comic Chef
- Francis McDonald as Western Saloon Set Heavy
- Bert Roach as Western Saloon Set Bartender
- Heinie Conklin as Studio Cop
- Ray Walker as Armistice Day Set Technician
- Ethan Laidlaw as Stagehand (uncredited)
- Lester Dorr as Reporter (uncredited)

== Soundtrack ==
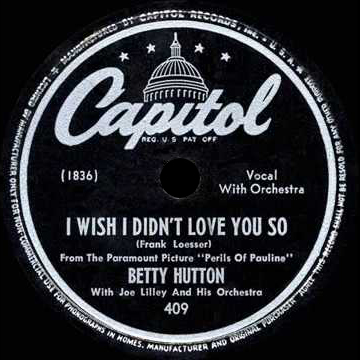
Introduced by Betty Hutton in The Perils of Pauline and released on Capitol Records, "I Wish I Didn't Love You So" received an Academy Award nomination for Best Original Song

- "Poor Pauline" (Written by Charles McCarron and Raymond Walker)
- Betty Hutton – "I Wish I Didn't Love You So" (Written by Frank Loesser)
- Betty Hutton – "The Sewing Machine" (Written by Frank Loesser)
- Betty Hutton – "Rumble, Rumble, Rumble" (Written by Frank Loesser)
- Betty Hutton – "Poppa, Don't Preach To Me" (Written by Frank Loesser)

== Reception ==
Bosley Crowther of New York Times wrote, "Paramount's The Perils of Pauline, which came sprawling and spluttering and crashing into the Paramount Theatre yesterday, is neither a reasonable facsimile of the silent ancient silent serial for which it is named, nor is it a rightful biography of the famous serial queen, Pearl White. Neither, for that matter, is it a valid reflection of the days of early movie-making which it loosely pretends to be".

A Variety review praised the comedy, cast, and silent film era nostalgia, calling the film "top entertainment for any situation" that "will register astoundingly at the [box office]".

== Awards ==
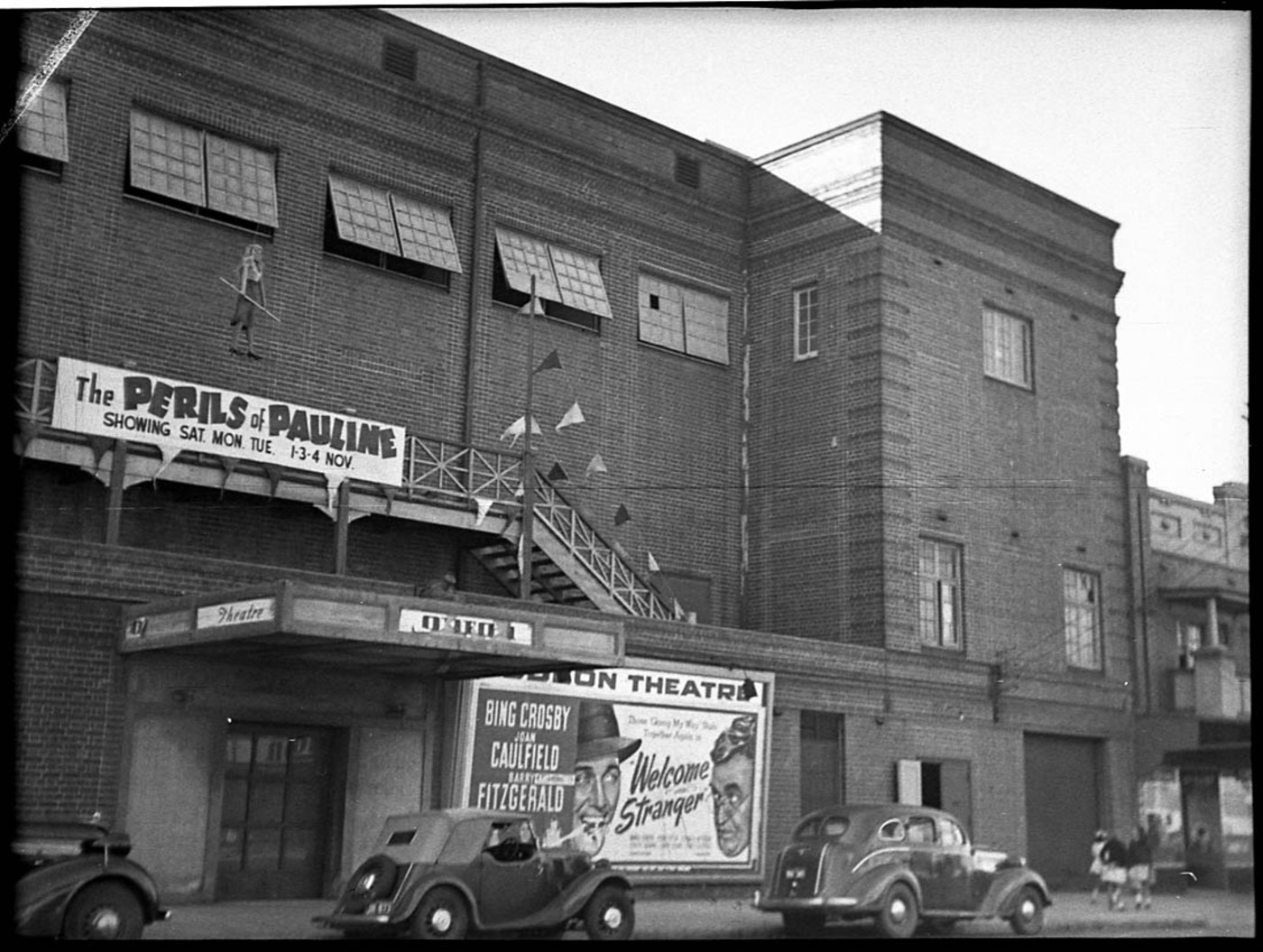
Billboard for the film during its initial run in Sydney, Australia

Frank Loesser was nominated for an Oscar in the category "Best Music, Original Song" for "I Wish I Didn't Love You So".

== See also ==
- The Perils of Pauline (1914), starring Pearl White
- The Perils of Pauline (1933), starring Evalyn Knapp and Craig Reynolds
- The Perils of Pauline (1967), starring Pamela Austin and Pat Boone
