= Space Songs =

Studio album
- Released: 1959
- Genre: Children's
- Label: Motivation Records

Space Songs is an album in the "Ballads For The Age of Science" or "Singing Science" series of scientific music for children from the late 1950s and early 1960s. Hy Zaret wrote the lyrics and Lou Singer wrote the music. Space Songs was released in 1959 by Hy Zaret's label "Motivation Records" (a division of Argosy Music Corp.) and was performed by Tom Glazer and Dottie Evans.

Other albums in the "Ballads for the Age of Science" series were: "Energy and Motion Songs," performed by Tom Glazer and Dottie Evans; "Weather Songs," performed by Tom Glazer and The Weathervanes; "Experiment Songs," performed by Dorothy Collins; "Nature Songs," and "More Nature Songs," both performed by Marais and Miranda.

== Track listing ==
No.	Title	Length
1.	"Zoom a Little Zoom"
2.	"What is the Milky Way?"
3.	"Constellation Jig"
4.	"Beep, Beep"
5.	"Why Does the Sun Shine?"
6.	"What is a Shooting Star?"
7.	"Longitude and Latitude"
8.	"It's a Scientific Fact"
9.	"Ballad of Sir Isaac Newton"
10.	"Friction"
11.	"Why Are Stars of Different Colors?"
12.	"Why Do Stars Twinkle?"
13.	"What is Gravity?"
14.	"Planet Minuet"
15.	"Why Go Up There?"

== In popular media ==
The alternative rock band They Might Be Giants recorded cover versions of two Space Songs, "Why Does The Sun Shine?", and "What Is A Shooting Star?", as well as a reply to the former called "Why Does the Sun Really Shine?" which corrects scientific errors in the original.

- Isaac Asimov wrote an essay called "Catskills in the Sky" which appeared in the August 1960 issue of The Magazine of Fantasy & Science Fiction. He tells an anecdote about his children receiving this album as a present. He liked the music so much, especially the song "Why Go Up There," that he appropriated the album for his own record collection. In the essay, he gave reasons as why mankind should "go up there."
- Japanese electronic music producer and DJ Yoshinori Sunahara sampled "Zoom a Little Zoom" in his song "Journey Beyond the Stars", which featured on his 1998 album Take Off and Landing.
- The song "Zoom a Little Zoom" has notably been used in the popular online vlog Rocketboom as its theme song.
- On the September 27, 2005 episode of Rocketboom, it featured the songs "Why Do Stars Twinkle?" and "Beep, Beep".
- In 2008, Chloé Leloup, Miss LaLaVox und Achim Treu reworked the album under the title "The Space Songs - Ballads for the Age of Science". The album was released on the label Sopot Records.
- The lyrics of the first stanza of "Why Does the Sun Shine?" also appear verbatim in the book Stars: A Golden Guide, apart from the omission of "its core is" before "a gigantic nuclear furnace".
