= The Arizona Raiders =

1936 film by James P. Hogan

- Theatrical release poster
- Directed by: James P. Hogan
- Written by: Zane Grey (novel Raiders of Spanish Peaks); Robert Yost (screenplay) and John W. Krafft (screenplay)
- Produced by: A.M. Botsford (producer); Daniel Keefe (associate producer)
- Starring: See below
- Cinematography: Leo Tover
- Edited by: Chandler House
- Distributed by: Paramount Pictures
- Release date: 1936
- Running time: 57 minutes
- Country: United States
- Language: English

The Arizona Raiders is a 1936 American Western film directed by James P. Hogan and starring Buster Crabbe and Marsha Hunt. It was based on the 1938 Zane Grey novel Raiders of Spanish Peaks and released by Paramount Pictures. The film is also known as Bad Men of Arizona (American reissue title).

== Plot ==
Nelson saves himself and Wilson from hanging. They acquire jobs at Lindsay's ranch and then foil horse thieves.

== Cast ==
- Buster Crabbe as "Laramie" Nelson
- Raymond Hatton as "Tracks" Williams
- Marsha Hunt as Harriett Lindsay
- Betty Jane Rhodes as Lenta Lindsay
- Johnny Downs as "Lonesome" Alonzo Q. Mulhall
- Grant Withers as Monroe Adams, Harriett's lawyer
- Don Rowan as Henchman Luke Arledge
- Arthur Aylesworth as Andy Winthrop
- Richard Carle as Boswell Albernathy, Justice of the Peace
- Herbert Heywood as First Sheriff at Hanging

== Soundtrack ==
- Betty Jane Rhodes - "My Melancholy Baby" (Written by Ernie Burnett, lyrics by George A Norton)
