= Unchained (film) =

1955 film by Hall Bartlett

- Directed by: Hall Bartlett
- Written by: Hall Bartlett
- Based on: Prisoners are People by Kenyon J. Scudder
- Produced by: Hall Bartlett
- Starring: Elroy Hirsch; Barbara Hale; Chester Morris; Todd Duncan; Johnny Johnston
- Cinematography: Virgil E. Miller
- Edited by: Cotton Warburton
- Music by: Alex North and Hy Zaret (song "Unchained Melody")
- Distributed by: Warner Bros. Pictures
- Release date: January 19, 1955
- Running time: 75 min.
- Country: United States
- Language: English

Unchained is a 1955 prison film written, produced and directed by Hall Bartlett (the first film directed by Bartlett) and starring Elroy Hirsch, Barbara Hale, Chester Morris, Todd Duncan, and Johnny Johnston. Based on the non-fiction book Prisoners are People by Kenyon J. Scudder, it is most remembered for its theme song, "Unchained Melody".

== Plot ==
Steve Davitt is held in a medium security prison and is struggling with a choice between two options: serving his full sentence and returning legitimately to his wife and family, or escaping and ending up on the run. Having received what he considers to be an unjust recommendation from the Adult Authority Board, he decides to escape. However, he is surprised by a trustee-inmate whom he has befriended, and a fist-fight ensues. Davitt wins the fight, and heading for the barbed-wire fence starts to climb. He hesitates twice, and looking back to see his friend on the ground decides against escaping after all. The scene ends with him turning round and heading back to the prison.

== Cast ==
- Elroy Hirsch as Steve Davitt
- Barbara Hale as Mary Davitt
- Chester Morris as Kenyon Scudder
- Peggy Knudsen as Elaine
- Jerry Paris as Joe Ravens
- John Qualen as Leonard Haskins

== Production ==
=== Development ===
The film was based on the career of Kenyon J. Scudder, former supervisor at Chino prison in California, as detailed in Scudder's book.

=== Casting ===
Former football player Elroy "Crazylegs" Hirsch played the lead character, while another inmate was played by Jerry Paris (later of The Dick Van Dyke Show), among others. Chester Morris portrayed reformist warden Kenyon J. Scudder, who authored the book the film is based on. Others in the cast included Peggy Knudsen and Barbara Hale, who appeared as women visiting the prisoners. Jazz musician Dexter Gordon has a small, uncredited role in the film, that of a saxophone player in the prison jazz band.

=== Filming ===
The film was shot at the prison in Chino, California, where Gordon was then serving time for possession of heroin.

=== Music ===
The theme song "Unchained Melody" was written by Alex North and Hy Zaret and performed by Todd Duncan. Todd Duncan played one of the prisoners and sang a shortened version of the song accompanied by another prisoner on guitar. The song was nominated at the 1955's Oscars for Best Song, but lost to "Love Is a Many-Splendored Thing".

Unchained Melody has since become a standard and one of the most recorded songs of the 20th century, most notably by the Righteous Brothers in 1965. Over 1,500 recordings of "Unchained Melody" have been made by more than 670 artists, in multiple languages. In 1955, three versions of the song charted in the Top 10 in the United States, and four versions appeared in the Top 20 in the United Kingdom simultaneously, an unbeaten record for any song. The song continued to chart in the 21st century.

== Awards and nominations ==
Award	Category	Nominee(s)	Result	Ref.
Academy Awards	Best Song	"Unchained Melody"; Music by Alex North; Lyrics by Hy Zaret	Nominated	
