= Dee Parker =

American actress

Dee Parker (died March 13, 2000) was an American model, singer, and actress best known for her work on local television in Detroit, Michigan. She also made recordings and performed in night clubs, with big bands, and with a symphony orchestra.

== Early years ==
A native of Chicago and the daughter of a Russian tailor, Parker went to Detroit in 1941 to begin her career as a singer. She originally performed as Del Parker but changed her name in 1945 to avoid being confused with another singer who had a similar name. Newspaper columnist Dorothy Kilgallen wrote in an article published on August 21, 1944, that Dell Parker, a showgirl on Broadway, was threatening to sue the singer for using that name.

== Career ==
Early in her career, Parker was a model with the John Robert Powers agency.

In the early 1940s, Parker sang in night clubs, performed with Phil Brestoff and his Michigan Theatre Orchestra, and had a program on CKLW radio.

Parker's work in night clubs included the 885 Club in Chicago and the Brass Rail and The Bowery in Detroit, where her performances included a variety of musical styles. A review of her performance at The Bowery in the trade publication Billboard described Parker as having "a clear, well-controlled but flexible voice, plus showmanship thru [sic] a directly-appealing versatility of expression ...".

In 1944, Parker sang with the Vaughn Monroe orchestra, but she left it to perform with the Star and Garter troupe in Chicago. Also in 1944, she was soloist with the Detroit Symphony Orchestra. On November 18, 1944, Parker was featured on the Blue Network's On Stage, Everybody program, which each week paired "a rising young starlet with an established performer." Parker's performing partner was Frank Sinatra. In 1948, she had a national radio program, Speaking of Songs.

In November 1945, she became the featured singer with Jimmy Dorsey and his orchestra.

Parker was best-known for The Auntie Dee Show, which she had on WXYZ-TV in Detroit from 1950 to 1956. The program was a showcase on which youngsters demonstrated their talents in singing and dancing. The show ended when the station replaced it with recorded programs from England. Parker and her husband tried to create a similar show on the West Coast, but child-labor laws limited the appearances of children without pay. Parker began doing commercials instead.

An item in the August 1, 1953, issue of Billboard described Parker as "the busiest woman in town" (Detroit), citing her "six half-hour commercial video shows ... and 25 five-minute shows weekly on radio."

She also acted in summer stock theatre in Indiana and in the Los Angeles area. TV shows on which she appeared included Line-Up, Day in Court, Rehearsal Call, and Woman's Diary.

== Personal life ==
Parker was initially married to Phil Brestoff, who died in 1967. In 1968, she married Guy Cherney, a childhood sweetheart, and they moved to San Francisco.

== Death ==
On March 13, 2000, Parker died at the Motion Picture & Television Country House and Hospital in Woodland Hills, California.

== Discography ==
| Song | Recording | Orchestra/ Vocal group |
|---|---|---|
| "Make Me Know It" (1946) | Decca 18923 | Jimmy Dorsey |
| "Quien Sabe? (Who Knows?)" (1947) | MGM 10010 | Jimmy Dorsey |
| “I’m Glad There Is You” (1946) | Decca18799 | Jimmy Dorsey |
| "Doin' What Comes Naturally" (1947) | Decca 18872 | Jimmy Dorsey |
| "Heartaches" (1947) | MGM 10001 | Jimmy Dorsey |
| "My Curly Headed Baby"/ "That's the Way He Does It" (1948) | Mercury 5149) | The Miniatures |
| "I'll Always Be in Love With You" (1948) | Decca 24363 | Jimmy Dorsey |
| "Doin' What Comes Natur'lly"/ "Ohl What a Beautiful Mornin'" (1950) | Decca 25487 | Jimmy Dorsey |
| "Quien Sabe? (Who Knows) (1952) | MGM 11230 | Jimmy Dorsey |
