= Vaughn Monroe Sings =

Studio album by Vaughn Monroe
- Released: 1948
- Label: RCA Victor

Vaughn Monroe chronology
Down Memory Lane (1948)	Vaughn Monroe Sings (1948)	Silver Lining (1949)

Professional ratings
Review scores
Source	Rating
Billboard	positive

Vaughn Monroe Sings is a studio album by American singer Vaughn Monroe, released in 1948 on RCA Victor.

== Release ==
The album was originally released as a set of four 10-inch 78-rpm phonograph records (cat. no. P-234). Later, it was made available on 45 rpm (four 7-inch records, cat. no. WP-234)

== Reception ==
Billboard perceived the album as having a big sales potential and picked it up for a review in the "Record Possibilities" column. The reviewer wrote: "With each passing year Vaughn Monroe appears to be getting warmer and truer with every tune his bottom-of-the-barrel pipes attack. [...] The songs are well selected standards and time-tested pops which are perfectly suited to his voice and which are lent additional appeal via tasty arranging and perfect tempos," singling out "The Whiffenpoof Song" (sung "in a simple and unpretentious manner") and "The Anniversary Song" ("equally simple and effective").

The album reached number one on Billboard's Best-Selling Popular Record Albums chart for two inconsecutive weeks in late January – early February 1949.

== Track listing ==
Set of four 10-inch 78-rpm records (RCA Victor P-234)

All the tracks except "Something Sentimental" are credited to Vaughn Monroe ans his orchestra. "Something Sentimental" also features The Norton Sisters.

20-3220-A
No.	Title	Writer(s)	Length
1.	"Begin the Beguine"	Porter

20-3220-B
No.	Title	Writer(s)	Length
1.	"The Moon Was Yellow"	Leslie–Ahlert

20-3221-A
No.	Title	Length
1.	"Anniversary Song"

20-3221-B
No.	Title	Writer(s)	Length
1.	"Something Sentimental"	Eaton—Ryerson—Monroe

20-3222-A
No.	Title	Length
1.	"Oh Promise Me"

20-3222-B
No.	Title	Length
1.	"Because"

20-3223-A
No.	Title	Writer(s)	Length
1.	"The Whiffenpoof Song"	Minnigerode—Pomeroy—Galloway

20-3223-B
No.	Title	Writer(s)	Length
1.	"Without a Song"	Rose—Eliscu—Youmans

== Charts ==
Chart (1949)	Peak position
US Billboard Best-Selling Popular Record Albums	1

== See also ==
- List of Billboard number-one albums of 1949
