= Down Memory Lane (album) =

Studio album by Vaughn Monroe
- Released: 1948
- Label: RCA Victor

Vaughn Monroe chronology
Vaughn Monroe's Dreamland (1946)	Down Memory Lane (1948)	Vaughn Monroe Sings (1948)

Professional ratings
On the Moonbeam / Down Memory Lane (CD, 2000)
Review scores
Source	Rating
AllMusic	4/5 stars

Down Memory Lane is a studio album by American singer Vaughn Monroe, released in 1948 on RCA Victor.

== Content ==
The album collects nostalgic songs.

== Release ==
The album was originally released as a set of four 10-inch 78-rpm phonograph records (cat. no. P-202).

== Reception ==
The album spent several weeks at number one on Billboard's Best-Selling Popular Record Albums chart in April–May 1948.

== Track listing ==
Set of four 10-inch 78-rpm records (RCA Victor P-202)

20-2717-A
No.	Title	Writer(s)	Length
1.	"Memory Lane"	DeSylva–Spier–Conrad

20-2717-B
No.	Title	Writer(s)	Length
1.	"Memories"	Gustave Kahn—Egbert Van Alstyne

20-2718-A
No.	Title	Writer(s)	Length
1.	"Memories of You"	Andy Razaf—Eubie Blake

20-2718-B
No.	Title	Writer(s)	Length
1.	"Just a Memory"	DeSylva—Brown—Henderson

20-2719-A
No.	Title	Writer(s)	Length
1.	"Remember"	Irving Berlin

20-2719-B
No.	Title	Writer(s)	Length
1.	"Thanks for the Memory"	Leo Robin—Ralph Rainger

20-2720-A
No.	Title	Writer(s)	Length
1.	"It's Easy to Remember"	Lorenz Hart—Richard Rodgers

20-2720-B
No.	Title	Writer(s)	Length
1.	"Roses for Remembrance"	Gus Kahn—Loyal Curtis

== Charts ==
Chart (1948)	Peak position
US Billboard Best-Selling Popular Record Albums	1

== See also ==
- List of Billboard Best-Selling Popular Record Albums number ones of 1948
