= So You're the One =

Single by Eddy Duchin And His Orchestra

from the album Columbia – 35812
- A-side: "So You're the One"
- B-side: "I Give You My Word"
- Released: 1940
- Genre: Pop
- Label: Columbia Records
- Songwriter(s): Alex Kramer, Hy Zaret, Joan Whitney

"So You're the One" is a song written by Alex Kramer, Hy Zaret and Joan Whitney. Recorded in 1940 by Eddy Duchin and his and his Orchestra, it peaked at number six on the Billboard charts.

Vaughn Monroe and his Orchestra also recorded the song in 1940 (Bluebird B-10901).
