= Paul Pendarvis =

Paul Pendarvis (born Paul Plumley Pendarvis; 2 December 1907 Enid, Oklahoma – 13 January 1987 Palmdale, California) was an American violinist and big band leader popular in the swing era.

== Career ==
Pendarvis was born in Enid, Oklahoma. After completing his junior year (11th grade) at Enid High School in 1924, he transferred to Santa Monica High School, graduating in 1925. He went on to attend the University of California, Los Angeles.

Pendarvis worked in business and had minor roles in silent films, then moved to Kansas City, Missouri, where he assembled a dance band that quickly found success. Pendarvis's band received radio airplay in the Kansas City area and worked regionally as a territory band in Kansas and the Midwest, including bookings at the Congress Hotel in Chicago. He also booked engagements in New York, and later in the decade moved the band to Los Angeles, playing venues on the California coast.

Early in the 1940s he dissolved the group and took a position directing a radio station in California.

== Recordings ==
Pendarvis recorded for Columbia Records from 1934 to 1935. His vocalists during this time included Patricia Norman, Eddie Scope, Jimmy Stewart and Marjorie Beatty. Later on, his vocalists included Marilyn Duke and Phyllis Lynne.

=== Discography ===
Title	Recording Date	Vocalist	Issue	Notes
A Little Angel Told Me So	November 9, 1934	Eddie Scope	Columbia 2974-D	From 1934 film, One Hour Late.
I’ve Got an Invitation to a Dance	November 9, 1934	Eddie Scope	Columbia 2974-D	
Mississippi Honeymoon	November 9, 1934	Eddie Scope	Columbia 2973-D	From the Carole Lombard film The Gay Bride. This is Pendarvis’ only Columbia recording to feature a violin, during the bridge of Scope’s vocal.
The Object of My Affection	November 9, 1934	Patricia Norman	Columbia 2973-D	
I’m in Love All Over Again	February 21, 1935	Patricia Norman	Columbia 3032-D	From 1935 film, “Hooray for Love”
Soon	February 21, 1935	Jimmy Stewart	Columbia 3025-D	From the 1935 film “Mississippi”.
It’s Easy to Remember	February 21, 1935	Jimmy Stewart	Columbia 3025-D	From the 1935 film “Mississippi”.
Would There Be Love?	February 21, 1935	Eddie Scope	Columbia 3032-D	
Thanks a Million	August 1935	Marjorie Beatty	Columbia 3082-D	From 1935 film, “Thanks A Million”
Page Miss Glory	August 1935	“Paul’s Playboys”	Columbia 3091-D	From Page Miss Glory (1935 film). “Paul’s Playboys” is a vocal trio including the voices of Eddie Scope, Jimmy Stewart and Marjorie Beatty.
Accent on Youth	August 1935	Jimmy Stewart	Columbia 3091-D	
I’m Sittin’ High on a Hill Top	August 1935	Eddie Scope	Columbia 3082-D	From 1935 film, “Thanks A Million”
