= Sweater Girl (film) =

1942 film by William Clemens

- Directed by: William Clemens
- Written by: Robert Blees; Beulah Marie Dix
- Starring: Eddie Bracken; June Preisser; Phillip Terry; Betty Jane Rhodes
- Cinematography: John J. Mescall
- Edited by: Alma Macrorie
- Music by: Victor Young
- Release date: 1942
- Country: United States
- Language: English

Sweater Girl is a 1942 American mystery and comedy film written by Robert Blees and Beulah Marie Dix, directed by William Clemens and starring Eddie Bracken, June Preisser, Phillip Terry, and Betty Jane Rhodes. It was released on July 13, 1942.

The film marked the debut of the classic World War II–era song, "I Don't Want To Walk Without You". The song was performed on-screen by actress Betty Jane Rhodes.

== Plot ==
While preparing for Midvale College's upcoming revue, which includes a trick shot with a gun, singer Susan Lawrence develops a romantic interest in Jack Mitchell, who also sings. Their friend Louise Menard is seeing Susan's brother, a professor. All are shocked when songwriter Johnny Arnold is strangled and school reporter Miles Tucker is poisoned with the glue from an envelope. McGill, a detective, begins an investigation into the murders.

One night, Jack volunteers to look after Louise's mother, a helpless invalid. Susan becomes worried and, when she arrives, Mrs. Menard is trying to help Jack, who has narrowly avoided being killed.

With help from Louise's father, a professor, McGill deduces that Mrs. Menard is holding a grudge from a previous child's death, which she blames on an initiation rite at the school. She has also secretly exchanged Susan's trick gun with a loaded one, which Susan unknowingly uses in the show. Everyone arrives too late, but Susan's aim is bad, Jack survives and all live happily ever after.

== Cast ==
- Eddie Bracken as Jack Mitchell
- Betty Jane Rhodes as Louise Menard
- June Preisser as Susan Lawrence
- Frieda Inescort as Mrs. Menard
- Charles D. Brown as Lt. McGill
- Kenneth Howell as Miles Tucker
- Johnnie Johnston as Johnny Arnold
- Nils Asther as Prof. Menard
- Phillip Terry as Prof. Martin Lawrence

== See also ==
- Sweater girl
