= Sound Off (The Duckworth Chant) =

Single by Vaughn Monroe and His Orchestra
- B-side: "Oh, Marry, Marry Me"
- Released: April 1951
- Recorded: March 7, 1951
- Genre: Traditional pop, march
- Length: 2:48
- Label: RCA Victor
- Songwriter(s): Willie Lee Duckworth

Vaughn Monroe and His Orchestra singles chronology
"On Top of Old Smoky" (1951)	"Sound Off (The Duckworth Chant)" (1951)	"Old Soldiers Never Die" (1951)

"Sound Off (The Duckworth Chant)" is a 1951 song written by Willie Lee Duckworth and performed by American singer Vaughn Monroe. It reached #3 on the Billboard Top 100 singles chart. It was also recorded by American country music duo Homer and Jethro.

== Weekly charts ==
Chart (1951)	Peak position
US Billboard Top 100	3
