= Salute for Three =

1943 film by Ralph Murphy

- Directed by: Ralph Murphy
- Written by: Doris Anderson; Charles Kenyon
- Produced by: Walter MacEwen
- Starring: Macdonald Carey; Betty Jane Rhodes; Dona Drake
- Cinematography: Theodor Sparkuhl
- Edited by: Arthur P. Schmidt
- Music by: Victor Young
- Color process: Black and white
- Production company: Paramount Pictures
- Distributed by: Paramount Pictures
- Release date: March 17, 1943
- Running time: 74 minutes
- Country: United States
- Language: English

Salute for Three is a 1943 American comedy musical film starring Macdonald Carey and Betty Jane Rhodes.

== Plot ==
The singer Judy Ames's agent thinks she might get some favorable and helpful publicity if he can arrange for her to appear to be in a new romance with Buzz McAlister, a war hero.

== Cast ==
- Betty Jane Rhodes as Judy
- Macdonald Carey as Buzz
- Marty May as Jimmy Gates
- Dona Drake as herself
- Noel Neill as Gracie O'Connor
- Cliff Edwards as Foggy

== Production ==
Jules Styne wrote some of the music.
