= The Auntie Dee Show =

1950s TV programme

The Auntie Dee Show was a 1950s television show in Detroit, Michigan. The show's host Dee Parker sang with Vaughn Monroe's orchestra from 1943 to 1944, with whom she recorded such songs as "One Too Often" and "When You Put On That Old Blue Suit Again" under the name "Del Parker". She changed her name to "Dee Parker" when she joined Jimmy Dorsey's band, with whom she recorded more than a dozen songs for Decca Records and MGM Records, before she found fame in Detroit [early 1950s] as TV kiddie talent show host, "Auntie Dee". She also hosted a short-lived variety show titled "Rehearsal Call" in 1949.

"Uncle Jimmy" (Stevenson) was the piano player on "The Auntie Dee Show." Parker moved to Los Angeles in 1956, where she continued her TV show and was a fixture at local supper clubs. She died in 2000. Among the performers on the show was 5 year old Mary Prevost, 7 year old composer/pianist Paul Schoenfield, and 14 year old Ursula Walker.[1]

The reward for performing was, depending on the episode's sponsor, a six-pack of Faygo Pop or a can of New Era potato chips.
