= Priorities on Parade =

1942 film by Albert S. Rogell

- Theatrical release poster
- Directed by: Albert S. Rogell
- Screenplay by: Art Arthur
- Produced by: Sol C. Siegel
- Starring: Ann Miller; Johnnie Johnston; Jerry Colonna; Betty Jane Rhodes; Barbara Jo Allen; Harry Barris; Eddie Quillan; Dave Willock
- Cinematography: Daniel L. Fapp
- Edited by: Arthur P. Schmidt
- Music by: Victor Young
- Production company: Paramount Pictures
- Distributed by: Paramount Pictures
- Release date: July 23, 1942
- Running time: 79 minutes
- Country: United States
- Language: English

Priorities on Parade is a 1942 American musical film directed by Albert S. Rogell and written by Art Arthur. The film stars Ann Miller, Johnny Johnston, Jerry Colonna, Betty Jane Rhodes, Barbara Jo Allen, Harry Barris, Eddie Quillan and Dave Willock. The film was released on July 23, 1942, by Paramount Pictures.

== Plot ==
During World War II, a dance band and other entertainers go to work in a munitions factory to help the war effort and stage a morale-boosting show.

== Cast ==
- Ann Miller as Donna D'Arcy
- Johnnie Johnston as Johnny Draper
- Jerry Colonna as Jeep Jackson
- Betty Jane Rhodes as Lee Davis
- Barbara Jo Allen as Mariposa Ginsbotham
- Harry Barris as Harvey Erkimer
- Eddie Quillan as Sticks O'Hara
- Dave Willock as Push Gasper
- Nick Cockrane as Frank
- Rod Cameron as Stage Manager
- Arthur Loft as E. V. Hartley
- The Debonnaires as Specialty Act
- William Forrest as Col. Reeves
- Warren Ashe as Psych. Test Administrator
- Lee Shumway as Jones
