= Betty Jane Rhodes =

American actress (1921–2011)

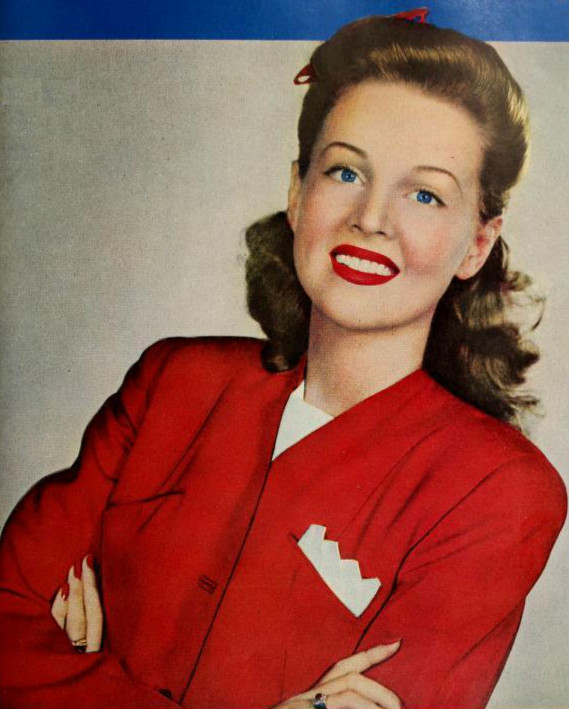
- Rhodes in 1942.
- Born: April 21, 1921; Rockford, Illinois, U.S.
- Died: December 27, 2011 (aged 90); Los Angeles, California, U.S.
- Other name: Jane Rhodes
- Occupations: Actress, singer

Betty Jane Rhodes (April 21, 1921 – December 27, 2011) was an American actress and singer, most active in film during the late 1930s and the World War II era. She was also known as Jane Rhodes.

== Early years ==
Rhodes was born in Rockford, Illinois on April 21, 1921. She began her broadcasting career when she was just eight years old.

== Career ==
=== Film ===
Before Rhodes appeared on screen, she worked in films as a ghost singer at RKO Pictures, earning $200 per week for supplying the voice for actresses who moved their lips, pretending to sing.

Paramount Pictures signed Rhodes to her first film contract as an actress at age 15. She made her screen debut in the 1936 film Forgotten Faces in which she was credited as Jane Rhodes. In Forgotten Faces, Rhodes played an adopted daughter whose father, portrayed by Herbert Marshall, is arrested for killing a man with whom his wife was having an affair.

This was followed by a co-starring role in the 1936 western The Arizona Raiders. The film, in which she played the younger sister of Marsha Hunt's character, marked the first time Rhodes sang in a movie.

By September 1936, Rhodes had signed a contract with Universal Pictures, which planned to have her play the lead female role in an upcoming Jungle Jim serial film. The six-year contract called for payments of $1,000 per week.

Rhodes was widely known to wartime movie audiences for her debut performance of the classic song, "I Don't Want To Walk Without You", in the 1942 film Sweater Girl. In 2012, Tom Vallance of The Independent wrote of Rhodes' performance, "Her place in the history of popular song is secured by her having introduced on screen one of the great songs of wartime longing, "I Don't Want To Walk Without You."

=== Radio ===
Rhodes first sang on the air on children's programs in Berkeley, California. When she was 12, she sang on The Laff Clinic on KHJ in Los Angeles and joined in the program's comedy elements. She also performed on several variety programs on KHJ. In 1934, she joined the staff of KFWB, also in Los Angeles. By August 14, 1934, she was top-billed on KWFB's Jubilee music and comedy program. In the summer of 1936, she sang on a program featuring Johnny Green and his orchestra.

Rhodes' first nationwide broadcast exposure came in the summer of 1940 when she sang on the Fred Allen Show during its three-week stay in Hollywood. She had her own weekly show Saturday nights on NBC during the 1950s. Her appearances, as well as other early television roles, earned her the nickname "The First Lady of Television." Rhodes also sang in cabaret until the 1960s.

Rhodes was the regular singer on the radio show Meet Me at Parky's, a series starring Harry Einstein as his character Parkyakarkas. She portrayed Betty, the singer at Parky's restaurant.

=== Nightclub ===
Rhodes sang at the Cocoanut Grove nightclub in Los Angeles when she was 14.

=== Recording ===
In its December 16, 1946 issue, Cashbox designated Rhodes' "You'll Always Be The One I Love" as "Sleeper of the Week". Charles Dant's orchestra accompanied Rhodes on the recording, which Cashbox said "has that trick of making you want to sit down and play the thing time and again."

== Personal life ==
In 1945, Rhodes married Willet Brown, co-founder of the Mutual Broadcasting System. She and Brown had one child during their marriage; their family also included Brown's three children from his previous marriage. Brown died in 1993.

Archeology was Rhodes' hobby. In 1937, she took a course at the University of Southern California, focusing on pottery and beads of early southwestern Americans.

== Death ==
Rhodes died December 27, 2011 at the age of 90.

== Selected filmography ==
Year	Title	Role	Notes
1936	Forgotten Faces	Sally McBride	
1936	The Arizona Raiders	Lenta Lindsay	
1937	Jungle Jim	Joan	
1942	Sweater Girl	Louise Menard	
1942	Priorities on Parade	Lee Davis	
1942	The Fleet's In	Diana Golden	
1943	Salute for Three	Judy	
