= Why Does the Sun Shine? (The Sun Is a Mass of Incandescent Gas) =

Why Does The Sun Shine? (The Sun Is a Mass of Incandescent Gas)

EP by They Might Be Giants
- Released: September 14, 1993
- Recorded: Excello Recording Studio, Brooklyn; Skyline Studio, Manhattan
- Genre: Alternative rock
- Length: 9:57
- Label: Elektra
- Producer: They Might Be Giants

They Might Be Giants chronology
Apollo 18 (1992)	''Why Does The Sun Shine? (The Sun Is a Mass of Incandescent Gas)'' (1993)	John Henry (1994)

Professional ratings
Review scores
Source	Rating
Allmusic	2/5 stars
Robert Christgau	(neither)

Why Does the Sun Shine? (The Sun Is a Mass of Incandescent Gas) is an EP by the American alternative rock band They Might Be Giants, released in 1993. It is the band's first release with a full-band line-up, rather than only the two original members, John Flansburgh and John Linnell, performing. It was also released as a single on 7-inch vinyl.

== Songs ==
The title song is a cover version of a song by Hy Zaret from Tom Glazer's 1959 album Space Songs. The lyrics for the refrain appear verbatim in the 1951 Golden Nature Guide Stars. They Might Be Giants re-arranged the song in an up tempo version for the 1998 live album, Severe Tire Damage, and the 2009 children's album, Here Comes Science, on which was added the self-written "Why Does the Sun Really Shine? (The Sun is a Miasma of Incandescent Plasma)", which corrects several factual inaccuracies in the original song. It was also included on the soundtrack to the children's game show Carmen Sandiego: Out of This World (1994) and was briefly heard in the Malcolm in the Middle episode "Malcolm Babysits".

The second track, "Jessica", was originally recorded by the Allman Brothers Band for the 1973 album Brothers and Sisters. The third track, "Whirlpool", is a song written by alternative rock band Meat Puppets on the 1991 album Forbidden Places. The fourth and final track, "Spy", is the only original composition on the EP. It was later re-recorded for the band's studio album, John Henry, released in 1994.

== Music video ==
A music video for the song directed by Maciek Albrecht was shown in an episode of the Nickelodeon television series KaBlam!. In the video, a group of students are listening to a scientist talk about the Sun, which makes its way to them and shines its brightest.

== Track listing ==
CD

No.	Title	Writer(s)	Length
1.	"Why Does the Sun Shine? (The Sun Is a Mass of Incandescent Gas)"	Hy Zaret, Lou Singer	2:53
2.	"Jessica"	Forrest Richard Betts	2:24
3.	"Whirlpool"	Curt Kirkwood	2:10
4.	"Spy"	John Flansburgh, John Linnell	2:30
Total length:			9:57

- The 7-inch vinyl release contains track 1 on side A and track 2 on side B.

== Personnel ==
- John Linnell – accordion, saxophone, bass clarinet, vocal
- John Flansburgh – electric guitar, vocal

Additional musicians

- Brian Doherty – drums, glockenspiel
- Kurt Hoffman – clarinet, saxophone
- Frank London – trumpet
- Graham Maby – bass guitar

Technical

- They Might Be Giants – producer
- Patrick Dillett – engineer, mixing
