= Lou Singer =

American songwriter, composer and arranger

Charles Louis Singer (26 February 1912 – December 1966), also known as Louis C. Singer and Lou Singer, was an American songwriter, composer, and arranger. He was known for his work with lyricist Hy Zaret, including the songs "One Meat Ball" and "It Could Be a Wonderful World", and for later music written for television animation.

== Early life ==
Singer was born in the Bronx, New York City, on 26 February 1912. He studied music at the Juilliard School, and also attended Columbia University and New York University. He was married to Rosalie Robin, and they had two daughters.

== Career ==
In the 1940s Singer worked in radio and popular music as a composer and arranger. With Hy Zaret he wrote "One Meat Ball", first published in 1944, and also wrote educational songs for the Little Songs series commissioned by WNEW. That series included "It Could Be a Wonderful World", which was later recorded by Pete Seeger.

He also wrote or co-wrote songs that were recorded by other performers, including "I Will Be Home Again" and "Am I a Toy or a Treasure".

With Paul Glass he also prepared a number of folk-song collections for Grosset & Dunlap, including Singing Soldiers: A History of the Civil War in Song and Songs of Hill and Mountain Folk.

In his later career, Singer composed music for television, including work on Gigantor and The Big World of Little Adam, both produced by his brother Al Singer.

== Death ==
Singer died at his home in Forest Hills, Queens, in late December 1966, aged 53.
