= Hy Zaret =

American Tin Pan Alley songwriter (1907–2007)

- Also known as: Hy Zaret
- Born: Hyman Harry Zaritsky; August 21, 1907; New York City
- Died: July 2, 2007 (aged 99) Westport, Connecticut, U.S.
- Occupation: Songwriter

Hy Zaret (born Hyman Harry Zaritsky; August 21, 1907 – July 2, 2007) was an American Tin Pan Alley lyricist and composer who wrote the lyrics of the 1955 hit "Unchained Melody", one of the most-recorded songs of the 20th century.

== Personal life ==
Zaret was born on August 21, 1907, in New York City to Jewish parents Max Zaritsky and Dora Shiffman, who had emigrated from Russia in the 1890s. He attended West Virginia University and Brooklyn Law School, where he received an LLB. He shortened his name legally from Zaritsky to Zaret in 1934. Zaret served in the Army's Special Services division during World War II.

Zaret had two sons, and was married to the former Shirley Goidel. He died at his home in Westport, Connecticut, on July 2, 2007, at the age of 99, a month before his 100th birthday.

== Career ==
He scored his first major success in 1936, when he teamed up with Saul Chaplin and Sammy Cahn to co-write the pop standard "Dedicated to You." The early 1940s brought some collaborations with Alex C. Kramer and Joan Whitney, including 1941's "It All Comes Back to Me Now" and the socially conscious, WWII-themed "My Sister and I." In 1941 Vaughn Monroe had a top 5 hit with the song "There I Go", which Zaret co-wrote with Irving Weiser.

Zaret wrote the lyrics for an English translation of the French Resistance song "La Complainte du Partisan" ("The Song of the French Partisan"). The song became popular after it was recorded by Leonard Cohen and others as "The Partisan". In 1944, he and Lou Singer wrote the popular hit novelty song "One Meatball", based on a song popular among Harvard undergraduates.

=== Military ===
Zaret wrote the lyrics for "Soldiers of God", the hymn of the United States Army Chaplain Corps, as well as the song of the Nurse Corps.

=== "Unchained Melody" ===
Zaret's co-wrote the song "Unchained Melody" with film composer Alex North for the 1955 prison film Unchained (hence the title), which was nominated for the Academy Award for Best Original Song. Three versions of the song – by Les Baxter, Al Hibbler, and Roy Hamilton – hit the U.S. Top Ten that year. The song was also recorded by Eddie Fisher, Jimmy Young and Liberace, and many others. The Righteous Brothers' 1965 version reached the U.S. pop Top Five; their recording was revived in 1990 thanks to its inclusion in the film, Ghost, reaching number 1 in the U.K. Elvis Presley, Sam Cooke, Cliff Richard, Roy Orbison and Donny Osmond also recorded versions of the song.

This song is unique in that it has made No.1 on the U.K. singles charts in four different guises by four different artists over a period of nearly fifty years: Jimmy Young (1955), The Righteous Brothers (1990), Robson & Jerome (1995) and Gareth Gates (2002). The latter three versions have all recorded certified sales in excess of one million copies in the U.K. alone.

=== Children's music ===
Zaret turned his attention to educational children's music in the late 1950s, collaborating with Lou Singer on a six-album series called Ballads for the Age of Science; different volumes covered space, energy and motion, experiments, weather, and nature. The records were quite successful, and the songs "Why Does the Sun Shine?" and "What is a Shooting Star?" were covered by alternative rock band They Might Be Giants in 1993 and 2000, respectively.

== See also ==
- Great American Songbook Foundation – where Hy Zaret's papers are housed. A collection guide can be found here.
