= Johnnie Johnston =

American actor and singer (1915–1996)

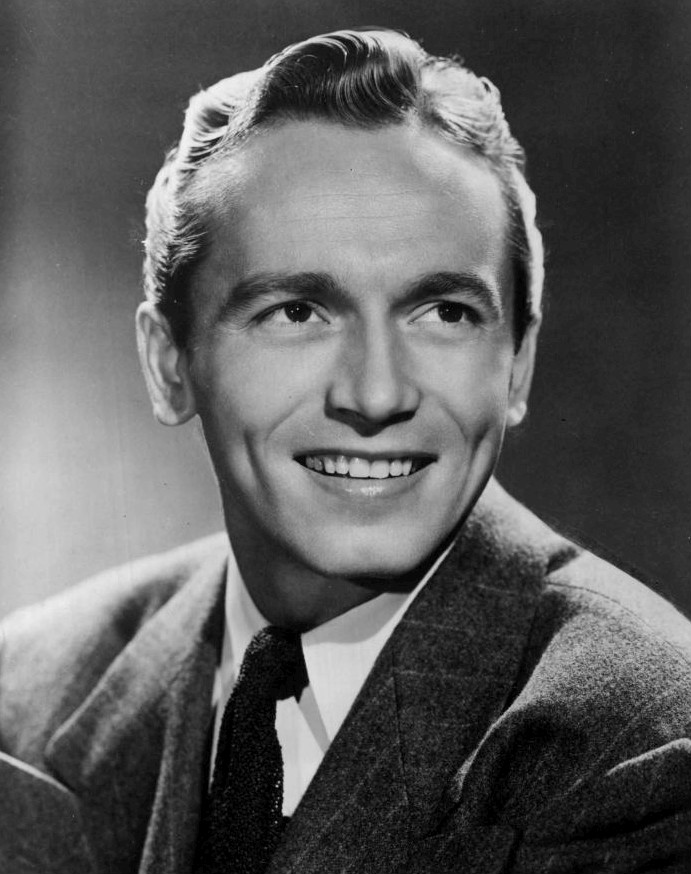
- Johnston in 1945
- Born: John Clifford Johnston; December 1, 1915; St. Louis, Missouri, US
- Died: January 6, 1996 (aged 80); Cape Coral, Florida, US
- Occupations: Actor; Singer
- Spouses: Dorothy Marubio; Kathryn Grayson (m. 1947; div. 1951) Shirley Carmel (m. 1952, divorced) Jacquelyn Sheresky Unger (m. 1961; sep. 1965) Beverley Markley (m. 1975)
- Children: 5
- Relatives: Kristin Towers-Rowles (granddaughter)

Johnny (or Johnnie) Johnston (December 1, 1915 – January 6, 1996) was an American singer and actor who was popular in the 1940s.

== Early years ==
He was born John Clifford Johnston in St. Louis, Missouri.

== Career ==
Johnston began his career in the late 1930s, performing in smaller nightclubs, and was soon hired to sing with Art Kassel and his Kassels in the Air orchestra. He regularly sang on radio programs, and for a while had his own show on the NBC network.

In 1942, Johnston signed with Capitol Records, one of the first of four artists signed by the company. He recorded That Old Black Magic, I Don't Want to Walk Without You, and other popular songs for the label. His 78rpm record of Laura sold more than a million copies in 1945.

Johnston's movie career began in 1942 with small singing roles (sometimes billed as Johnnie Johnston). During his first marriage, Johnston had an affair with MGM singing star Kathryn Grayson, whom he would later marry. At her urging, he was cast in the 1946 MGM musical, Till the Clouds Roll By. Their scenes together were ultimately cut from the film, though outtakes have survived.

He next appeared opposite Esther Williams in the MGM musical romance This Time for Keeps. Actor Van Johnson had originally been cast as Williams' co-star in the film, until Johnston stepped in to replace him.

After starring in a 1948 Eagle-Lion Western, The Man from Texas, with James Craig and Lynn Bari, Johnston appeared in only two more feature films, Unchained (1955) and Rock Around the Clock (1956).

A short-lived TV variety program, The Johnny Johnston Show, debuted on February 2, 1951, on the CBS network, and ended on February 9, 1951. Johnston sang and hosted the 45-minute show, which was broadcast on weekday afternoons.

In 1951, Johnston appeared with actress Shirley Booth in the Broadway musical production, A Tree Grows in Brooklyn, directed by George Abbott and choreographed by Herbert Ross. The show, based on the novel by Betty Smith, opened on April 19, 1951, at the Alvin Theatre, where it ran for 267 performances.

Throughout the 1950s and 1960s, Johnston continued to appear regularly in nightclubs, and occasionally on television variety programs. For a while, he also operated his own nightclub in New York City.

== Personal life and death ==
Johnston was married five times, and had five children.

He married his second wife, actress Kathryn Grayson, at an August 22, 1947 ceremony in Carmel, California. On October 7, 1948, the couple's only child, daughter, Patricia Kathryn "Patty Kate" Johnston, was born. Grayson and Johnston separated on November 15, 1950. On October 3, 1951, Grayson was given a divorce from Johnston on the grounds of mental cruelty.

Johnston's This Time for Keeps co-star, Esther Williams, claimed in her 1999 autobiography that while making the film, Johnston would read Grayson's intimate love letters aloud to the girls in his fan club, including the "all-too-graphic details concerning what she liked about love-making."

On July 31, 1952, Johnston married his third wife, Shirley I. Carmel, in Greenwich, Connecticut.

He died in 1996, in Cape Coral, Florida, aged 80.

== Hit recordings ==
Year	Single	US Chart position	label	catalog #
1945	(All of a Sudden) My Heart Sings	7	Capitol	186
1945	Laura	5	Capitol	196
1945	There Must Be a Way	9	Capitol	196
1946	One More Dream (and She's Mine)	13	Capitol	228

== Filmography ==
- Star Spangled Rhythm (1942)
- Priorities on Parade (1942)
- Till the Clouds Roll By (1946) (scenes deleted)
- This Time for Keeps (1947)
- The Man from Texas (1948)
- Unchained (1955)
- Rock Around the Clock (1956)
