= Moonmaids (vocal group) =

American vocal group

The Moonmaids (sometimes styled as two words: Moon Maids) were an American female jazz and popular vocal quartet that started out as college student entertainers under the name "North Texas Swingtet". As the Swingtet, they launched and performed with the Aces of Collegeland at the University of North Texas in 1943 and grew in popularity throughout the region. Vaughn Monroe hired the group, renamed it "The Moonmaids", and debuted them with his orchestra on April 11, 1946, at Loews Theater in Washington, D.C. The Moonmaids rapidly rose to national acclaim performing and recording with the Vaughn Monroe Orchestra for RCA Victor. Within four months of joining Monroe, the Moonmaids were on the cover of Down Beat (August 26, 1946) and featured in Radio Mirror (January 1947) With personnel changes now and then, the Moonmaids performed with Vaughn Monroe from 1946 to 1952.

== Members ==
	Founding members
Katie Myatt; 1943–1947	Katie Myatt (née Verda Kathryne Myatt; 1926–1965) — sang with the group for the initial 15-month engagement with the Monroe Orchestra, then returned from New York in July 1947 to marry Moddie Eugene Smith (1927-2015) on July 19, 1957, and re-enter college at North Texas as a senior that fall. At birth, she had been adopted by John Franklin Myatt (1888–1968) and wife, Lois "Nana" Myatt (née Denton; 1892–1959), who had taken her home from the hospital after her mother died giving birth to her. Her biological father's surname was McClendon. Moddie and Katie had two children, Steven Lynn Smith (born 1950) and April Smith (born 1952).
Hilda Tinker; Cunningham; 1943–19??	Tinker Cunningham (née Hilda Grace Cunningham; born 1928) married Bill Rautenberg (né William Guido Rautenberg; 1924–2004) on July 16, 1951, in Denton, Texas
Arline (Arlene) Truax; 1943–19??	Arline Truax (1927–1985) left to marry James Rex Meek (1926–1989). She was connected to music and North Texas through her father, Glen Truax (né Alvah Glen Truax; 1896–1968), who was a distinguished pioneer music educator at the high school and college levels in and around Canyon, Texas. He had been an orchestra director, double bassist, and swing band leader. His also had held short posts at West Texas A&M University (orchestra director and director of instrumental music around 1946) and had studied music during the summer at the North Texas (1944).
Mary Jo; Thomas; 1943–19??	Mary Joe Thomas (1927-2022) married singer Harrold Curtis Grogan (1920-2014) on April 7, 1951, in Dallas
	Other members
Maree Lee; 1947–1952	Before joining the Moonmaids, Maree Lee (née Ahn; 1924-2016) from Bellevue, Ohio, had been a singer with the Lee Sisters Quartet (aka Le Ahn Sisters, two of whom were her real sisters) performing with Horace Heidt (beginning in 1940), Ted Lewis, Monroe, then as soloist with Dick Rogers, then with the Norton Sisters, then, after the Moonmaids (who replaced the Norton Sisters) had been working with Monroe, she joined the Moonmaids, turning it into a quintet. In addition to her ensemble roles, she had been Monroe's lead singer. Soon after two Moonmaid singers left to get married, the quintet became a quartet again, with Lee filling the third spot (replacing Myatt) and June Hiett filling the fourth. Lee left Monroe's band on December 20, 1952, to get married. She was married to Warren Grafe (1921-1973) and George William Eger, Jr. (1918–2002).
June Hiett; 19??–19??	June Hiett (né Dorothy June Hiett; 1925-2019) married Ed Bratone (né Edmund John Braghittoni; 1910–1981), a violinist with Monroe’s orchestra, on January 6, 1951, in Arlington, Texas.
Lois Wilber; 19??–1953	Lois Wilber (née Lois Marguerite Wilber, 1928-2014), originally of Minneapolis, was a member of the Moonmaids for several years. In 1952, she married Ernie Johnson (né Ernest Eugene Johnson; 1921–1970), originally from Rockland, Maine, who played piano and arranged for the Vaughn Monroe Orchestra for 7 1/2 years, and later, for his own band.

== Selected discography ==
Eddie South

- The Eddie South Trio with Vaughn Monroe and His Orchestra, AB Fable Records (E)ABCD1-009 (CD) (2005) OCLC 79452953, 374048498

Trio: Hank Jones (piano), Eddie South (violin), Leonard Gaskin (bass)
Orchestra: Frank L. Ryerson (trumpet, arranger-1), James Messina, Richard Lasala, Fred Taylor, Ed Shedowsky (trumpet-1) or Sal Gianetina (trumpet-1), Sam Hyster, Bill Mustard, Joseph Conigliaro, Joseph Bennett (trombone-1), Andy Bagni (né Andrew Joseph Bagni; 1907–1984), Phil Olivella (né Philip R. Olivella; 1918–1995) (alto sax-1) or Louis Feldman (alto sax-1), Ziggy Talent, John West (tenor sax-1) or Vito Marasco (tenor sax-1), Michael Shelby (piano-1), Bucky Pizzarelli (guitar-1), Maurice Ancher, Ed Bratone (né Edmund John Braghittoni; 1910–1981), Sam Caplan, Seymour Berman, Irving Raymond (violin-1), John Pastore (cello-1) or Eduardo Sodero (cello-1) Jack Fay (bass-1), Edward Julian (drums-1), Vaughn Monroe (vocal)
Moonmaids: Kathryn Katie Myatt, Hilda Tinker Cunningham, Arlene Truax, Mary Joe Thomas, Mary Lee (vocals) — aka Mahree Ahm
Recorded during The Vaughn Monroe Show, WCBS CBS, New York, January 11, 1947

1. Daphne
2. I Can't Believe That You're In Love With Me, Vaughn Monroe and His Orchestra, Moonmaids

Vaughn Monroe and The Moon Maids

- 20-1920-A: "Just The Other Day" (audio clip), by Austem Croon-Johnson and Redd Evans

20-1920-B: "When The Angelus Is Ringing" (audio clip), by Joe Young & Bert Grant, RCA Victor (78 rpm) (1946) OCLC 83171033

- 20-1892-A: "Who Told You That Lie?" (audio clip), by Jack Segal, Eddie Cantor, and Bee Walker

20-1892-B: "It's My Lazy Day", by Smiley Burnette, RCA Victor (78 rpm) (1946) OCLC 319130496

- 20–2294–A: "I Wish I Didn't Love You So", RCA Victor (78 rpm)

20–2294–B: "Tallahassee"

- 20–2361–A: "You Do", RCA Victor (78 rpm)

20–2361–B: "Kokomo, Indiana"

- 20–2523–A: "How Soon (Will I Be Seeing You)?" RCA Victor (78 rpm)

20–2523–B: "True"

- 20–2573–A: "Passing Fancy", RCA Victor (78 rpm)
- 20–2671–B: "Someone Cares", RCA Victor (78 rpm) (1947)
- 20–2712–B: "Completely Yours", RCA Victor 12S1 (78 rpm) (1947)
- 20–2748–A: "It's The Sentimental Thing To Do", RCA Victor L-1S2-IV (78 rpm)

20–2748–B: "Like We Used To Do", RCA Victor L-15S4-IV (78 rpm)

- 20–2811–A: "What Do I Have To Do (To Make You Love Me)?" RCA Victor 8S (78 rpm)

20–2811–B: "A Little Imagination (It Only Takes)"

- 20-3606-A: "So This Is Love" ("The Cinderella Waltz") (audio clip), lyrics by Mack David, Al Hoffman, and Jerry Livingston (1949)

20-3606-B: "There's No One Here But Me", RCA Victor, DJ-816 (78 rpm) (1949) OCLC 83805995

- 20-3942-A: "A Marshmallow World" (audio clip), RCA Victor (78 rpm) (1950) OCLC 78595050

20-3942-B: "Snowy White Snow And Jingle Bells"

== Filmography ==
- Carnegie Hall (1947)

Moonmaids with the Vaughn Monroe Orchestra in the film were Mary Jo Thomas, Tinker Cunningham, Arline Truax, Katie Myatt, and Maree Lee.
