= How Soon (Will I Be Seeing You?) =

1947 song written by Jack Owens

Single by Jack Owens
- B-side: "Begin the Beguine"
- Released: July 1947
- Genre: Traditional pop; easy listening
- Length: 2:54
- Label: Tower Records
- Songwriters: Jack Owens; Carroll Lucas

Jack Owens with Eddie Ballantine and His Orchestra singles chronology
"How Soon (Will I Be Seeing You?)" (1947)	"I'm All Dressed Up With a Broken Heart" (1947)

Vaughn Monroe singles chronology
"Ballerina" (1947)	"How Soon (Will I Be Seeing You?)" (1947)	"Cool Water" (1948)

Bing Crosby singles chronology
"You Do" (1947)	"How Soon (Will I Be Seeing You?)" (1947)	"The Whiffenpoof Song" (1947)

Dinah Shore singles chronology
"Golden Earrings" (1947)	"How Soon (Will I Be Seeing You?)" (1947)	"In a Little Book Shop" (1947)

"How Soon (Will I Be Seeing You?)" is a 1947 song written by Jack Owens and Carroll Lucas, performed by Owens and backed by Eddie Ballantine's orchestra. It was originally made popular by Owens, and later Vaughn Monroe in the same year.

== Jack Owens original ==
The original song, released by Jack Owens in July 1947, runs for two minutes and fifty-four seconds, and is in the key of C sharp major, with a tempo of 98 beats per minute. The song is written about the narrator's eagerness to see his lover once again, "[hear] tender little love words," and "dance the way we used to".

According to Billboard issue of the week ending October 25, 1947,

The Owens waxing of "How Soon," his own tune, came about accidentally when the crooner-song-spinner did a promotional recording date for the Reynolds' Pen Company. On the A side of the platter, which was used in the pen firm's plant for broadcast to employees, was a tune about the Reynolds' rocket pen. Rather than leave the other side blank, Owens did his "How Soon" ditty. Eventually the platter was sent out to pen distributors and retailers, and reports came filtering back about the response on the Owens tune. After several orders for shipments of the Reynolds promotional platter came in from people who had heard it, the tune was cut by Dick Bradley, of Tower, who originally cut the Reynolds sides.

Billboard wrote in their review of the song, "Owens has a sneaker item in this recording, which is the first on a tune with good possibilities. Tune has lyrics with a message, plus a catchy melody. Ballantine's radio crew do nice backup job," and six weeks later, called it "another small label waxing that shows signs of causing some stir, written and performed on this disk in better than adequate fashion by tunesmith Jack Owens." Cashbox wrote, "Wailing in perfect, brilliant tones of subdued cupid melody, Jack makes the wordage sit up right close to you. Musical accompaniment offered by the Eddie Ballantine ork blends well with the crooner’s pitch to make the cake shine. Jack’s pleasing vocal efforts are sure to click with every phono op in the nation."

Owens' record charted for fourteen weeks on the Best Sellers in Stores chart, peaking at number 4, and ranking as Billboard's 17th biggest song of 1947. The song also peaked at number 5 in Canada.

== Vaughn Monroe version ==
Monroe's version, the most popular cover, was released in November 1947. At 3 minutes and 7 seconds, it shares a tempo of 98 beats per minute with the original, but this time in the key of B major.

Billboard wrote of it, "The fiddle section and trombones for the banks and bridges is a pairing that's tailor-made for the maestro's piping. Monroe sings it with a nice measure of tenderness, getting nice rhythmic support from the band and vocal assist from the Moon Maids." Cashbox highlighted the "slow, mellow vocal styling" which "boosts the platter as an item for the phonos," adding, "Vaughn’s heavy-throated vocal on this pop deck should gamer loads of play, especially so in those lush spots where the lights are low. Stuff is way down deep in the serious vein, with Vaughn and the combo chorus swelling throughout."

Monroe's version charted for thirteen weeks on the Best Sellers in Stores chart, peaking at number 5, and ranking as Billboard's 32nd biggest song of 1947.

== Bing Crosby version ==
Bing Crosby's version, released in August 1947, at two minutes and 56 seconds long, is in the key of C major with a tempo of 95 beats per minute. It was produced in collaboration with Carmen Cavallaro, who plays a heavy amount of piano throughout the track.

Billboard called it a "pleasant pattering of sentimentality, sung in his usual easy and relaxed ballad style, with Cavallaro's piano sparking the accompanying rhythm instruments to create a background of lyrical intimacy."

Crosby's cover charted for nine weeks on Billboard's Best Sellers in Stores chart, peaking at number 8.

== Other versions ==
- Dinah Shore, who charted for one week at number 14 with her cover for the week ending January 3, 1948. Both Billboard and Cashbox reviewed the record.
- John Laurenz, reviewed by Billboard (Note: See citation next to quote at top of page) and Cashbox.
- Dick Farney, reviewed by Cashbox.
- Guy Cherney, reviewed by Cashbox.
- Al Alberts in 1958
- Pat Boone in 1959
- Martha Wainwright in 2003
