= I Don't Want to Walk Without You =

1941 popular song

Song
- Published: 1941
- Genre: Traditional Pop
- Songwriter: Jule Styne
- Lyricist: Frank Loesser

"I Don't Want to Walk Without You" is a popular song. It was published in 1941. The music was written by Jule Styne with the lyrics by Frank Loesser.

== Background ==
Composer Irving Berlin was a huge admirer of the song. Berlin reportedly said that of all the songs by other composers he had heard, he would have been most proud to have written "I Don't Want to Walk Without You". Writing of Berlin's praise for the song, Loesser wrote in his diary, "Irving Berlin came in today and spent a solid hour telling me that 'Walk' is the best song he ever heard. He played and sang it over, bar by bar, explaining why it's the best song he ever heard. I was flattered like crazy."

A review in the trade publication Billboard called the composition "one of those natural songs with a down-to-earth story that boy sings to girl and vice versa, with a matching melody that makes it contagious on the first listen".

== 1942 recordings ==
- "I Don't Want to Walk Without You" became a number one pop hit for Harry James and his orchestra in 1942, with Helen Forrest as vocalist (Columbia 36478), *Both Bing Crosby and Dinah Shore.
- Tommy Tucker also recorded the song on December 2, 1941
- Vaughn Monroe recorded it on November 24, 1941 (Bluebird 11399).

== Later recordings ==
There have been several charting versions of this song during the rock era:

- Phyllis McGuire charted with her 1964 version, peaking at No. 13 on the Middle-Road Singles chart, and No. 79. on the Hot 100.
- Barry Manilow released a version of the song in early 1980. It was the third single released from his album One Voice (1979). His rendition reached No. 36 on the U.S. Billboard Hot 100 and No. 2 on the Adult Contemporary chart. Its best chart performance was in Canada, where it spent two weeks atop the Adult Contemporary chart.

== Popular culture ==
- "I Don't Want to Walk Without You" was first performed in the 1942 Paramount Pictures film, Sweater Girl, by actress Betty Jane Rhodes. In 2012, Tom Vallance of The Independent wrote of Rhodes' performance, "Her place in the history of popular song is secured by her having introduced on screen one of the great songs of wartime longing, "I Don't Want to Walk Without You"."
- Olive Oyl serenaded Popeye with this song in the 1946 Popeye the Sailor cartoon Klondike Casanova.
