= Vaughn Monroe =

American singer (1911–1973)

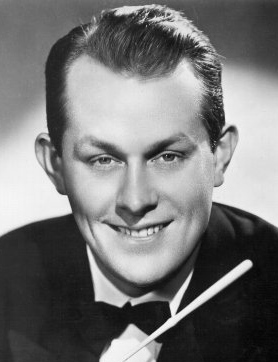

Background information
- Born: Vaughn Wilton Monroe; October 7, 1911; Akron, Ohio, U.S.
- Died: May 21, 1973 (aged 61) Stuart, Florida, U.S.
- Genres: Big band, traditional pop
- Years active: 1939–1965
- Labels: RCA, Dot
- Website: Vaughn Monroe Big Band Era Singer

Vaughn Wilton Monroe (October 7, 1911 – May 21, 1973) was an American baritone singer, trumpeter and big band leader who was most popular in the 1940s and 1950s. He has two stars on the Hollywood Walk of Fame, one for recording and another for radio performance.

== Early life ==
Monroe was born in Akron, Ohio, United States. He graduated from Jeannette High School in Pennsylvania in 1929.

== Career ==
Monroe formed his first orchestra in Boston, Massachusetts, in 1940 and became its principal vocalist. He began recording for RCA Victor's subsidiary label, Bluebird. That same year, Monroe built The Meadows, a restaurant and nightclub to the west of Boston on Massachusetts Route 9 in Framingham, Massachusetts. After he ceased performing, he continued running the club until his death in 1973.

The summer of 1942 brought a 13-week engagement on radio, as Monroe and his orchestra had a summer replacement program for Blondie on CBS.

Monroe hosted the Camel Caravan radio program from The Meadows, starting in 1946 and, during this time, was featured in a Camel cigarettes commercial. In 1952, Monroe and his orchestra had a weekly program on Saturday nights on NBC radio. Those programs originated on location from wherever the band happened to be touring. Each program featured a focus on a college in the United States.

Monroe was often described as "tall and handsome", a trait that reportedly boosted his career both in music and Hollywood. His appearance and distinctive baritone voice earned him the nicknames "the Baritone with Muscles", "the Voice with Hair on its Chest", and "Ol' Leather Tonsils".

Monroe recorded extensively for RCA Victor until 1956, and his signature tune was "Racing With the Moon" (1941). It sold more than one million copies by 1952, becoming Monroe's first million-seller, and was awarded a gold disc by the RIAA. Among his other hits were "In the Still of the Night" (1939), "There I Go" (1941), "There I've Said It Again" (1945), "Let It Snow, Let It Snow, Let It Snow" (1946), "Ballerina" (1947), "Melody Time" (1948), "Riders in the Sky" (1949), "Someday (You'll Want Me To Want You)" (1949), "Sound Off" (1951), and "In the Middle of the House" (1956). He also turned down the chance to record "Rudolph the Red-Nosed Reindeer".

Monroe's orchestra had a number of notable musicians, including Bucky Pizzarelli, who later became famous for his career in jazz guitar. While the orchestra's focus was largely on romantic ballads, they would also play swung jazz tunes at the end of the night. These performances were not recorded as frequently as their standard music, though they were enjoyed by patrons.

Monroe had some success in acting, and over his career appeared in Meet the People (1944), Carnegie Hall (1947), Singing Guns (1950), and Toughest Man in Arizona (1952). However, acting was not his main focus, so he “did not pursue a movie and television career with vigor.” Another non-music endeavour in his career was the co-authoring of The Adventures of Mr. Putt Putt (1949), a children's book about airplanes.

After leaving the performing end of show business, Monroe remained with RCA for many years as a television spokesperson, executive, and talent scout. Though neither party confirmed or denied this, some have credited Monroe's work as a talent scout for the discovery and fame of Neil Sedaka. He was awarded two stars on the Hollywood Walk of Fame, one for recording at 1600 Vine Street and one for radio at 1755 Vine Street in Hollywood, California.

== Television ==
Monroe hosted several musical television shows in the 1950s. In 1950 for one season he hosted the half-hour The Vaughn Monroe Show on CBS. He had two runs on NBC during the summers of 1954 and 1955 with the twice-weekly 15-minute The Vaughn Monroe Show,. During 1957 he hosted Air Time '57, a live musical variety series that aired on ABC.

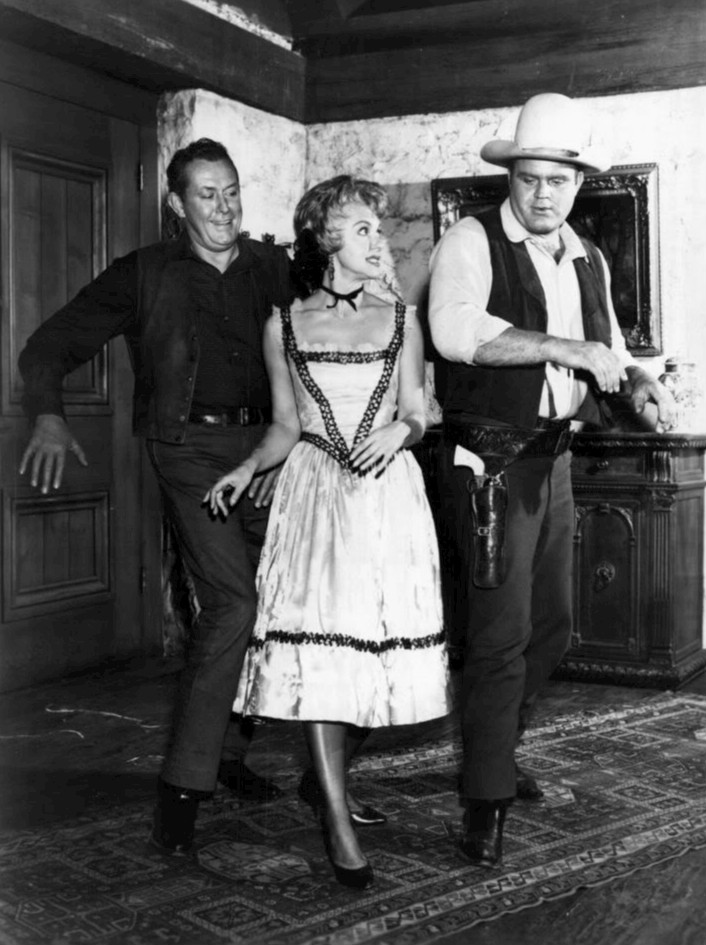
Monroe as a guest star in a 1962 Bonanza episode

He appeared on Bonanza, The Mike Douglas Show, The Ed Sullivan Show, Texaco Star Theatre, The Jackie Gleason Show, The Tonight Show Starring Johnny Carson, and American Bandstand. Monroe was a major RCA stockholder and appeared in print ads and television commercials for the company's television and audio products.

== Personal life ==
Monroe married Marian Baughman on April 2, 1940, in Jeannette, Pennsylvania, where they had met as high school students. They did not date during high school, but became romantically inclined toward each other when their paths crossed again in New York City, years after graduation. They returned to Jeannette for their wedding. They had two children, Candace and Christina. They remained married until Vaughn's death in 1973.

An avid railroad enthusiast, Monroe collected and built HO scale model trains. On concert tours he had a workshop that folded into a valise. Inside were hundreds of tools to build operating miniature locomotives, passenger and freight cars.

== Death ==
Monroe died on May 21, 1973, at Martin County Memorial Hospital in Florida, shortly after having stomach surgery for a bleeding ulcer.

== Monroe Orchestra personnel ==
- Moonmaids, a female vocal quartet (1946 to 1952)
- Frank L. Ryerson, arranger & trumpeter (1944)
- Ziggy Talent
- George Robinson, trombone (1944–1945)
- Andrew (Andy) Bagni, lead saxophone (1939–1958)
- Bucky Pizzarelli, guitar
- Joe Connie, lead trombone
- Johnny Watson, arranger, baritone saxophone
- Wedo Marasco, alto saxophone
- Red Nichols, jazz trumpet
- Mike Shelby, piano
- Maree Lee, vocalist (Moonmaids)
- Tinker Cunningham, vocalist (Moonmaids)
- Babe Feldman, tenor saxophone
- Jack Fay, string bass
- Gerry Bruno, string bass
- Mary Jo Grogan, vocalist (Moonmaids)
- Art Dedrick, trombone, arranger
- Ray Conniff, trombone
- Eddie Julian, drums
- Benny West, trumpet
- June Hiett, vocalist (Moonmaids)
- Arnold Ross, piano
- Don Costa, arranger
- Marilyn Duke, vocalist
- Betty Norton, vocalist (Moonmaids)
- Arlene Truax, vocalist (Moonmaids)
- Katie Myatt, vocalist (Moonmaids)
- Jerry Bruno, bassist
- Dino DiGiano, trumpet (1941–1945)
- Bobby Rickey, drums

== Discography ==
=== Selected albums ===
Year	Album	Peak positions
Year	Album	US BB
1945	On the Moonbeam	1
1946	Vaughn Monroe's Dreamland	2
1948	Down Memory Lane	1
1948	Vaughn Monroe Sings	1
1949	Silver Lining	3

==== Compilation albums ====
Year	Album	Peak positions
Year	Album	US BB
1967	The Best of Vaughn Monroe	

=== Singles ===
Year	Title	Chart positions			
Year	Title	US BB	Whitburn's Top 30	US BB Hot 100	US BB Bubbling Under
1940	"There I Go"	5	1		
	"Is It Love or Is It Conscription?"		26		
1941	"So You're the One"	18	16		
1941	"High on a Windy Hill"	15	13		
1941	"There'll Be Some Changes Made"	20	24		
1941	"Racing with the Moon"		25		
1941	"G'bye Now"	14	12		
1941	"The Worm Who Loved the Little Tater Bug"		22		
1941	"Yours (Quiereme Mucho)"	18	16		
1941	"If It's You"		23		
1942	"The Shrine of Saint Cecilia"	20	21		
1942	"Tangerine"	16	11		
1942	"Three Little Sisters"	18	13		
1942	"My Devotion"	5	1		
1942	"Hip, Hip, Hooray"		20		
1942	"When the Lights Go On Again"	2	1		
1943	"Let's Get Lost"	8	1		
1944	"The Trolley Song"	4	4		
1944	"Take It, Jackson"	20			
1944	"The Very Thought of You"	14	19		
1945	"Rum and Coca-Cola"	8	8		
1945	"There! I've Said It Again"	1	1		
1945	"Just a Blue Serge Suit"	17	17		
1945	"Something Sentimental"	12	12		
1945	"Fishin' for the Moon"	11	17		
1945	"Let It Snow! Let It Snow! Let It Snow!"	1	1		
1946	"Are These Really Mine?"	12	12		
1946	"Seems like Old Times"	7	7		
1946	"Who Told You That Lie?"	15	15		
1946	"It's My Lazy Day"	16	16		
1946	"The Things We Did Last Summer"	13	13		
1947	"You Can't See the Sun When You're Cryin'"		21		
1947	"Dreams Are a Dime a Dozen"		22		
1947	"I Wish I Didn't Love You So"	2	2		
1947	"Kokomo, Indiana"	10	10		
1947	"You Do"	5	5		
1947	"Ballerina"	1	1		
1947	"How Soon (Will I Be Seeing You?)"	3	3		
1947	"In a Little Book Shop"		21		
1948	"Passing Fancy"		24		
1948	"Matinee"		20		
1948	"Completely Yours"		22		
1948	"It's the Sentimental Thing to Do"		21		
1948	"Melody Time"		22		
1948	"Blue Shadows on the Trail"		26		
1948	"What Do I Have to Do?"		23		
1948	"Cool Water"	9	9		
1948	"The Maharajah of Magador"	19	19		
1948	"Ev'rday I Love You (Just a Little Bit More)"	22	22		
1948	"In My Dreams"	20	20		
1949	"Red Roses for a Blue Lady"	3	3		
1949	"Riders in the Sky: A Cowboy Legend" (Note: Peaked at No. 2 in Billboard Country singles.)	1	1		
1949	"Someday"	1	1		
1949	"That Lucky Old Sun"	6	6		
1949	"Vieni Su (Say You Love Me Too)"	29	29		
1949	"Mule Train"	10	10		
1950	"Bamboo"	4	4		
1950	"Thanks, Mister Florist"	20	20		
1951	"On Top of Old Smoky"	8	8		
1951	"Sound Off (The Duckworth Chant)"	3	3		
1951	"Old Soldiers Never Die"	7	7		
1951	"Meanderin'"	28	28		
1952	"Charmaine"	27	27		
1952	"Mountain Laurel"	22	22		
1952	"Lady Love"	18	18		
1952	"Idaho State Fair"	20	20		
1953	"Ruby"		27		
1954	"They Were Doin' the Mambo"	7	7		
1955	"Black Denim Trousers and Motorcycle Boots"			38	
1956	"Don't Go To Strangers"			38	
1956	"In the Middle of the House"			11	
1959	"The Battle of New Orleans"			87	
1965	"Queen of the Senior Prom"				132
