= 1944 in music =

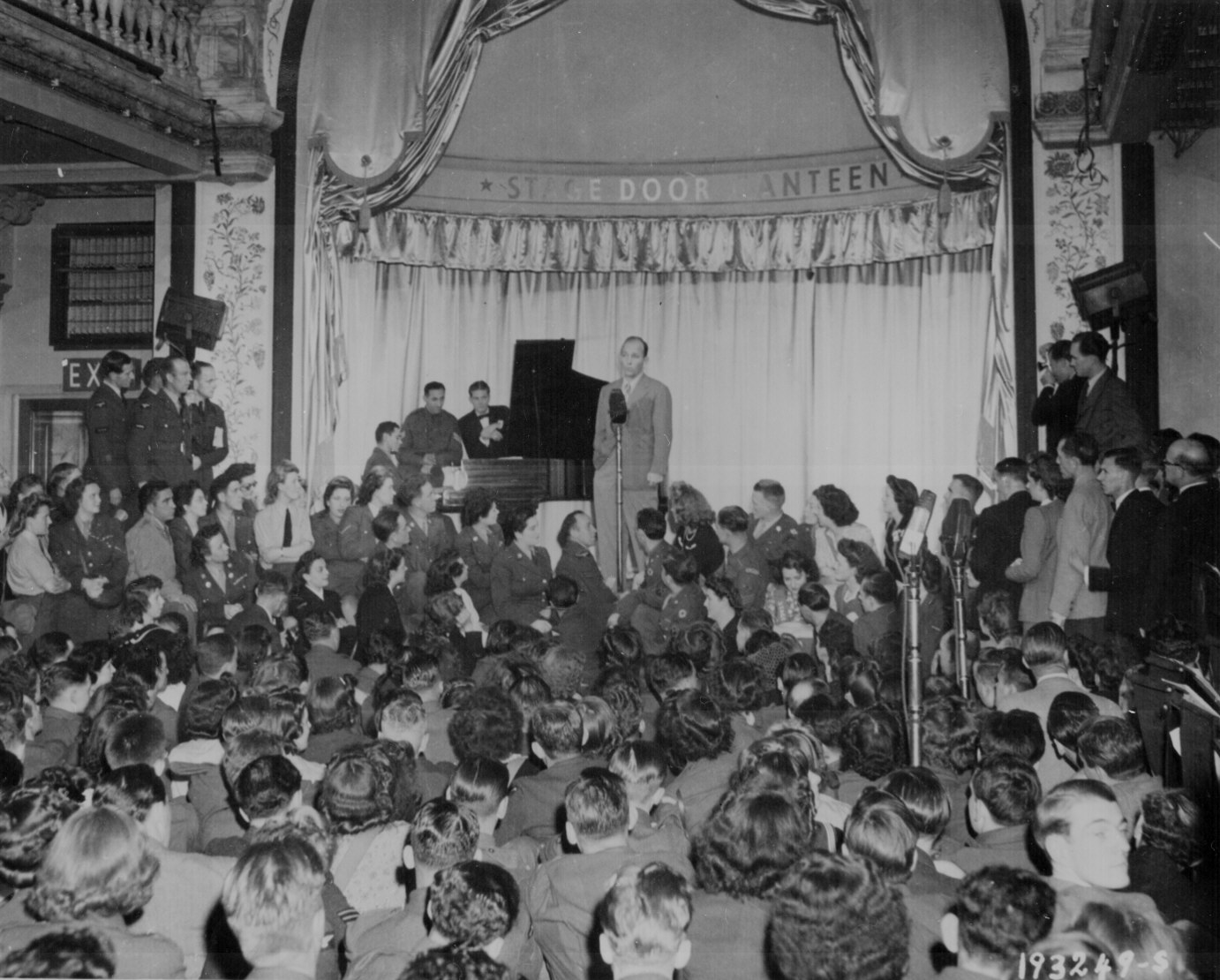
Singer Bing Crosby performing in London, 1944

This is a list of notable events in music that took place in the year 1944.

== Specific locations ==
- 1944 in British music
- 1944 in Norwegian music

== Specific genres ==
- 1944 in country music
- 1944 in jazz

== Events ==
- January 18 – The Metropolitan Opera House in New York City for the first time hosts a jazz concert; the performers are Louis Armstrong, Benny Goodman, Lionel Hampton, Artie Shaw, Roy Eldridge and Jack Teagarden.
- February – The Leipzig Gewandhaus Orchestra loses its concert hall in an Allied air raid.
- February 19 – The Billboard modifies its "Most Played Juke Box Records" chart to rank records (previously it had ranked songs, listing multiple records for each). The year-end "Top Disks" of 1944 will now be based on performance on the "Best Selling Retail Records" and "Most Played Juke Box Records" charts.
- July 28 – Sir Henry Wood, aged 75, conducts his last Promenade Concert, evacuated to Bedford.
- August 19 – Italian singers Lucia Mannucci and Virgilio Savona get married.
- September 20 – Yehudi Menuhin gives the first British performance of Béla Bartók's Second Violin Concerto in Bedford, in the opening concert of a tour with the B.B.C. Orchestra conducted by Sir Adrian Boult.
- Autumn – Peggy Guggenheim's The Art of This Century gallery on Manhattan releases a 78 rpm 3-record album containing Paul Bowles' Sonata for Flute and Piano and Two Mexican Dances with a cover by Max Ernst.
- October 25 – Notoriously bad amateur soprano Florence Foster Jenkins gives her only public recital, in Carnegie Hall, a month before her death.
- November 11 – AFM strike ends when Columbia, Victor and NBC "throw in the sponge" and agree to terms.
- December 15 – Glenn Miller is reported missing. The official explanation is that his plane went down somewhere over the English Channel, although many alternate theories have been suggested.
- Singer Billy Murray retires to Long Island.
- English contralto Kathleen Ferrier makes the first of her recordings of the aria "What is Life?" (Che farò) from Gluck's Orfeo ed Euridice which will rival sales by more popular singers over the next few years.
- Czech Jewish composer Hans Krása's children's opera Brundibár is performed many times in Theresienstadt concentration camp, where on October 17 the composer is killed.
- Flo Sandon's makes her stage debut, singing in a charity show.
- Jo Stafford launches her solo career.
- Frankie Laine cuts his first singles for the Beltone and Atlas labels.

== Albums released ==
- The Wayfaring Stranger – Burl Ives
- Girl Crazy – Judy Garland and Mickey Rooney
- Going My Way – Bing Crosby
- Boogie Woogie In Blue – Harry Gibson

== Top records ==
On August 1, 1942, a strike by the American Federation of Musicians ended all recording sessions. Record companies kept business going by releasing recordings from their vaults, but by mid-1943, alternate sources were running dry, as the strike continued. Decca was the first company to settle in September 1943, but RCA Victor and Columbia held on until November 11, 1944. It comes as no surprise that fifteen of the top twenty records of 1944 were released by Decca, with two more by Capitol, the second company to settle.

Beginning February 19, 1944, The Billboard modified its "Most Played Juke Box Records" chart to rank records (previously it had ranked songs, listing multiple records for each). The January 6, 1945, issue contained year-end top ten charts for "Best Selling Retail Records", "Most Played Juke Box Records" and "Top 10 Disks for 1944", the latter combining the scores of the former two charts. The chart below was compiled using Billboard's formula, but includes each record's full chart period, with weeks from 1943 and 1945 as needed. Details from "Most Played Juke Box Folk Records" (Hillbilly), "Harlem Hit Parade" (HHP) charts and the "American Folk Records" column late 1943-early 1944 were also considered. As always, numerical rankings are approximate.

Rank	Artist	Title	Label	Recorded	Released	Chart positions
1	Bing Crosby	"Swinging on a Star"	Decca 18597	February 7, 1944	April 1944	US BB 1944 #1, US #1 for 9 weeks, 28 total weeks, 1,000,000 sales
2	Bing Crosby and the Andrews Sisters	"Don't Fence Me In"	Decca 23364	July 25, 1944	November 1944	US BB 1944 #2, US #1 for 8 weeks, 21 total weeks, 1,000,000 sales
3	Harry James and His Orchestra (Vocal Dick Haymes)	"I'll Get By (As Long As I Have You)"	Columbia 36698	April 7, 1941	March 1944	US BB 1944 #3, US #1 for 6 weeks (Juke Box chart), 29 total weeks
4	The Mills Brothers	"You Always Hurt The One You Love"	Decca 18599	February 27, 1944	May 1944	US BB 1944 #4, US #1 for 5 weeks, 32 total weeks, US R&B 1944 #29, Harlem Hit Parade #5 for 3 weeks, 24 total weeks, 1,000,000 sales
5	Jimmy Dorsey and his Orchestra (vocals Bob Eberle and Helen O'connell)	"Besame Mucho"	Decca 18574	October 7, 1943	December 1943	US BB 1944 #5, US #1 for 7 weeks, 25 total weeks, 1,000,000 sales
6	Dinah Shore	"I'll Walk Alone"	Victor 20-1586	April 11, 1944	May 19, 1944	US BB 1944 #6, US #1 for 4 weeks, 26 total weeks, US R&B 1944 #44, Harlem Hit Parade #10 for 2 weeks, 2 total weeks, CashBox #1, USPop #1 for 5 weeks, 14 total weeks
7	Bing Crosby	"I'll Be Seeing You"	Decca 18595	February 17, 1944	April 1944	US BB 1944 #7, US #1 for 4 weeks, 28 total weeks
8	Glen Gray and the Casa Loma Orchestra	"My Heart Tells Me (Should I Believe My Heart?)"	Decca 18567	October 1, 1943	November 1943	US BB 1944 #8, US #1 for 5 weeks, 24 total weeks
9	Red Foley	"Smoke on the Water"	Decca 6102	May 4, 1944	June 13, 1944	US BB 1944 #57, US #7 for 1 week, 11 total weeks, US Hillbilly 1944 #2, MPJBFR #1 for 13 weeks, 27 total weeks
10	Bing Crosby	"I Love You"	Decca 18595	February 11, 1944	March 1944	US BB 1944 #9, US #1 for 5 weeks, 19 total weeks
11	Ella Fitzgerald & The Ink Spots	"I'm Making Believe"	Decca 23356	August 30, 1944	October 1944	US 1944 #10, US #1 for 2 weeks, 18 total weeks, CashBox #4, USPop #1 for 1 week, 24 total weeks, US R&B 1944 #18, Harlem Hit Parade #2 for 1 week, 14 total weeks
12	King Cole Trio	"Straighten Up and Fly Right"	Capitol 154	November 30, 1943	April 14, 1944	US BB 1944 #67, US #9 for 1 week, 12 total weeks, US R&B 1944 #2, Harlem Hit Parade #1 for 10 weeks, 24 total weeks, US Hillbilly 1944 #3, MPJBFR #1 for 5 weeks, 16 total weeks
13	Bing Crosby	"San Fernando Valley"	Decca 18586	December 29, 1943	February 1944	US BB 1944 #11, US #1 for 5 weeks (Juke Box chart), 24 total weeks
14	Ella Fitzgerald & The Ink Spots	"Into Each Life Some Rain Must Fall"	Decca 23356	August 30, 1944	October 1944	US BB 1944 #16, US #1 for 2 weeks (Juke Box chart), 19 total weeks, US R&B 1944 #1, Harlem Hit Parade #1 for 11 weeks, 21 total weeks, CashBox #14, USPop #9 for 1 week, 19 total weeks, 1,000,000 sales
15	The Andrews Sisters	"Shoo-Shoo Baby"	Decca 18572	October 5, 1943	November 1943	US BB 1944 #12, US #1 for 5 weeks (Juke Box chart), 22 total weeks
16	Louis Jordan and His Tympany Five	"G.I. Jive"	Decca 8659	March 15, 1944	April 1944	US BB 1944 #13, US #1 for 2 weeks (Juke Box chart), 22 total weeks, US R&B 1944 #4, Harlem Hit Parade #1 for 6 weeks, 26 total weeks
17	Merry Macs	"Mairzy Doats"	Decca 18588	December 13, 1943	January 1944	US BB 1944 #14, US #1 for 5 weeks (Juke Box chart), 14 total weeks, Decca Records' best-selling release of 1944
18	Helen Forrest and Dick Haymes	"Long Ago (and Far Away)"	Decca 23317	January 27, 1944	April 1944	US BB 1944 #15, US #2 for 1 week, 20 total weeks
19	The Pied Pipers	"The Trolley Song"	Capitol 168	May 19, 1944	September 1944	US BB 1944 #17, US #2 for 2 weeks, 15 total weeks
20	Bing Crosby and the Andrews Sisters	"Hot Time in the Town of Berlin"	Decca 23350	June 30, 1944	August 24, 1944	US BB 1944 #20, US #1 for 6 weeks (Juke Box chart), 15 total weeks

== Top race records ==
Rank	Artist	Title	Label	Recorded	Released	Chart positions
1	Ella Fitzgerald & The Ink Spots	"Into Each Life Some Rain Must Fall"	Decca 23356	August 30, 1944	October 1944	US BB 1944 #16, US #1 for 2 weeks (Juke Box chart), 19 total weeks, US R&B 1944 #1, Harlem Hit Parade #1 for 11 weeks, 21 total weeks, CashBox #14, USPop #9 for 1 week, 19 total weeks
2	King Cole Trio	"Straighten Up and Fly Right"	Capitol 154	November 30, 1943	April 14, 1944	US BB 1944 #67, US #9 for 1 week, 12 total weeks, US R&B 1944 #2, Harlem Hit Parade #1 for 10 weeks, 24 total weeks, US Hillbilly 1944 #3, USHB #1 for 5 weeks, 16 total weeks
3	Duke Ellington	"Do Nothin' Till You Hear From Me"	Victor 20-1547	March 15, 1940	December 1943	US BB 1944 #73, US #10 for 2 weeks, 23 total weeks, US R&B 1944 #4, Harlem Hit Parade #1 for 9 weeks, 18 total weeks
4	Louis Jordan and His Tympany Five	"G.I. Jive"	Decca 8659	March 15, 1944	April 1944	US BB 1944 #13, US #1 for 2 weeks (Juke Box chart), 22 total weeks, US R&B 1944 #4, Harlem Hit Parade #1 for 6 weeks, 26 total weeks
5	Lionel Hampton and His Orchestra	"Hampton's Boogie Woogie"	Decca 18613	August 30, 1944	August 1944	US R&B 1944 #5, Harlem Hit Parade #1 for 6 weeks, 23 total weeks

== Popular hit records ==
- "Amor" recorded by
  - Andy Russell
  - Bing Crosby
- "And Her Tears Flowed Like Wine" by Stan Kenton with Anita O'Day
- "Artistry In Rhythm" by Stan Kenton
- "Cherry" by Harry James
- "D-Day" by Nat King Cole
- "Don't Sweetheart Me" by Lawrence Welk
- "First Class Private Mary Brown" by Perry Como
- "Goodnight Irene" by Lead Belly
- "A Hot Time In the Town of Berlin" by Bing Crosby & the Andrews Sisters
- "Is You Is or Is You Ain't My Baby" performed by
  - The Andrews Sisters
  - Louis Jordan
- "It Could Happen To You" by Jo Stafford
- "It Had to Be You" by Dick Haymes and Helen Forrest
- "It's Love-Love-Love" by Guy Lombardo
- "Saturday Night (Is the Loneliest Night of the Week)" by Frank Sinatra
- "Speak Low" by Guy Lombardo
- "(There'll Be A) Hot Time in the Town of Berlin" by The Andrews Sisters
- "The Trolley Song" recorded by
  - Judy Garland
  - Vaughn Monroe and His Orchestra
- "Time Waits For No One" by Helen Forrest
- "There Goes That Song Again" by Russ Morgan

== Published popular music ==
- "Ac-cent-tchu-ate The Positive" words: Johnny Mercer, music: Harold Arlen
- "All of a Sudden My Heart Sings" w. (Eng) Harold Rome (Fr) Jean Marie Blanvillain m. Herpin
- "And Her Tears Flowed Like Wine" w. Joe Greene m. Stan Kenton & Charles Lawrence
- "As Long as There's Music" w. Sammy Cahn m. Jule Styne. Introduced in the film Step Lively by Frank Sinatra.
- "Bell Bottom Trousers" w.m. Moe Jaffe
- "The Boy Next Door" w.m. Hugh Martin & Ralph Blane
- "Candy" w. Mack David & Joan Whitney m. Alex Kramer
- "Can't Help Singing" w. E. Y. Harburg m. Jerome Kern
- "Dance with a Dolly" w.m. Terry Shand, Jimmy Van Eaton & David Kapp
- "Don't Explain" w. Billie Holiday m. Arthur Herzog Jr.
- "Don't Fence Me In" w.m. Cole Porter
- "Dream" w.m. Johnny Mercer
- "Fine Brown Frame" w.m. Guadalupe Cartiero & J. Mayo Williams
- "First Class Private Mary Brown" w.m. Frank Loesser
- "The Flaming Sword of Liberation" m. Glenn Miller
- "G.I. Jive" w.m. Johnny Mercer
- "Going My Way" w. Johnny Burke m. Jimmy Van Heusen
- "Have Yourself A Merry Little Christmas" w.m. Hugh Martin & Ralph Blane
- "A Hot Time in the Town Of Berlin" w. John De Vries m. Joe Bushkin
- "How Blue the Night" w. Harold Adamson m. Jimmy McHugh
- "How Little We Know" w. Johnny Mercer m. Hoagy Carmichael. Introduced by Lauren Bacall in the film To Have And Have Not.
- "I Begged Her" w. Sammy Cahn m. Jule Styne
- "I Didn't Know About You" w. Bob Russell m. Duke Ellington
- "I Dream of You (More Than You Dream I Do)" w.m. Marjorie Goetschius & Edna Osser
- "I Fall in Love Too Easily" w. Sammy Cahn m. Jule Styne
- "I Love You" w.m. Cole Porter
- "I'll Walk Alone" w. Sammy Cahn m. Jule Styne
- "I'm Beginning to See the Light" w.m. Duke Ellington, Don George, Johnny Hodges & Harry James
- "I'm Headin' For California" w.m. Glenn Miller & Artie Malvin
- "I'm Making Believe" w. Mack Gordon m. James V. Monaco
- "Into Each Life Some Rain Must Fall" w.m. Allan Roberts & Doris Fisher
- "It Could Happen to You" w. Johnny Burke m. Jimmy Van Heusen. Introduced by Dorothy Lamour and Fred MacMurray in the film And the Angels Sing
- "It's Love, Love, Love" w. Mack David m. Alex Kramer & Joan Whitney
- "Jealous Heart" w.m. Jenny Lou Carson
- "Keep a Sunbeam in Your Pocket" w.m. V. Guest & M. Sherwin from the film Bees in Paradise
- "Leave the Dishes in the Sink, Ma" w.m. Milton Berle, Gene Doyle & Spike Jones
- "Like Someone in Love" w. Johnny Burke m. Jimmy Van Heusen. Introduced by Dinah Shore in the film Belle of the Yukon.
- "A Little on the Lonely Side" w.m. Dick Robertson, Frank Weldon & James Cavanaugh
- "Long Ago (and Far Away)" w. Ira Gershwin m. Jerome Kern. Introduced by Martha Mears dubbing for Rita Hayworth in the film Cover Girl
- "Milkman, Keep Those Bottles Quiet" w.m. Don Raye & Gene De Paul
- "More and More" w. E. Y. Harburg m. Jerome Kern From the Universal film Can't Help Singing
- "My Dreams Are Getting Better All The Time" w. Mann Curtis m. Vic Mizzy
- "Nancy (With the Laughing Face)" w. Phil Silvers m. Jimmy Van Heusen
- "New York, New York" w. Betty Comden & Adolph Green m. Leonard Bernstein
- "Now I Know" w. Ted Koehler m. Harold Arlen
- "On the Atchison, Topeka and the Santa Fe" w. Johnny Mercer m. Harry Warren
- "One Meat Ball" w. Hy Zaret m. Lou Singer
- "Please Don't Say No" w. Ralph Freed m. Sammy Fain from the film Thrill of a Romance
- "Put It There Pal" w. Johnny Burke m. Jimmy Van Heusen
- "Rum and Coca-Cola" w.m. Morey Amsterdam, Paul Baron & Jeri Sullivan
- "Saturday Night" w. Sammy Cahn m. Jule Styne
- "Sentimental Journey" w. Bud Green m. Les Brown & Ben Homer
- "Seven-O-Five" m. Glenn Miller
- "Sleighride in July" w. Johnny Burke m. Jimmy Van Heusen. Introduced by Dinah Shore in the film Belle of the Yukon.
- "Someday (You'll Want Me to Want You)" w.m. Jimmie Hodges
- "Spring Will Be a Little Late This Year" w.m. Frank Loesser
- "Stella by Starlight" w. Ned Washington m. Victor Young
- "Swinging on a Star" w. Johnny Burke m. Jimmy Van Heusen
- "There Goes That Song Again" w. Sammy Cahn m. Jule Styne
- "There's A Fellow Waiting In Poughkeepsie" w. Johnny Mercer m. Harold Arlen
- "There's No You" w. Tom Adair m. Hal Hopper
- "This Heart of Mine" w. Arthur Freed m. Harry Warren
- "Till Then" w.m. Eddie Seiler, Sol Marcus & Guy Wood
- "Twilight Time" w.m. Buck Ram, Mortie Nevins & Artie Dunn
- "Umbriago" w.m. Irving Caesar & Jimmy Durante
- "You Always Hurt the One You Love" w.m. Allan Roberts & Doris Fisher
- "You Belong To My Heart" w. (Eng) Ray Gilbert m. Agustín Lara
- "You Can't Get That No More" w.m. Louis Jordan & Sam Theard
- "You're Nobody till Somebody Loves You" w.m. Russ Morgan, Larry Stock & James Cavanaugh

== Classical music ==
=== Premieres ===
Composer	Composition	Date	Location	Performers
Antheil, George	1942 (Symphony No. 4)	1944-02-13	New York City	NBC Symphony – Stokowski
Barber, Samuel	Capricorn Concerto	1944-10-08	New York City	Saidenberg Little Symphony – Saidenberg
Barber, Samuel	Symphony No. 2	1944-03-03	Symphony Hall, Boston	Boston Symphony Orchestra – Koussevitzky
Bartók, Béla	Concerto for Orchestra	1944-12-01	Boston	Boston Symphony – Koussevitzky
Bartók, Béla	Sonata for Solo Violin	1944-11-26	New York City	Menuhin
Bernstein, Leonard	Jeremiah (Symphony No. 1)	1944-01-28	Pittsburgh	Tourel / Pittsburgh Symphony – Bernstein
Carter, Elliott	Symphony No. 1	1944-04-27	Rochester, New York	Eastman-Rochester Symphony – Hanson
Copland, Aaron	Letter from Home	1944-10-17	New York City	Philco Radio Hour Orchestra – Whiteman
Copland, Aaron	Violin Sonata	1944-01-17	New York City	Posselt, Copland
Dallapiccola, Luigi	Liriche Greche III – Sex Carmina Alcaei	1944-11-10	Rome	Danco / RAI Symphony in Rome – Previtali
Ginastera, Alberto	Canciones populares argentinas	1944-07-17	Buenos Aires	Frías de López, Luzzatti
Ginastera, Alberto	Obertura para el Fausto criollo	1944-05-12	Santiago de Chile	Chile Symphony – Castro
Ginastera, Alberto	Preludios americanos	1944-08-07	Buenos Aires	Spivak
Hindemith, Paul	Symphonic Metamorphosis of Themes by Carl Maria von Weber	1944-01-20	New York City	New York Philharmonic – Rodzinski
Jolivet, André	Danses rituelles	1944-12-05	Paris	Paris Conservatory Concert Society Orchestra – Cluytens
Jolivet, André	Poèmes intimes	1944-04-04	Paris	Bernac / Paris Conservatory Concert Society Orchestra – Cluytens
Jongen, Joseph	Piano Concerto	1944-01-06	Brussels	Del Pueyo / Brussels Philharmonic – André
Khachaturian, Aram	Suite from Masquerade	1944-08-06	Moscow	USSR Radio Symphony Orchestra – Gorchakov
Moore, Douglas	In memoriam	1944-04-27	Rochester, New York	Eastman-Rochester Symphony – Hanson
Piston, Walter	Symphony No. 2	1944-03-05	Washington DC	USA National Symphony – Kindler
Prokofiev, Sergei	Piano Sonata No. 8	1944-12-30	Moscow	Gilels
Rainier, Priaulx	String Quartet	1944-07-03	London	Zorian Quartet
Schoenberg, Arnold	Ode to Napoleon Buonaparte	1944-11-23	New York City	Harrel, Steuermann / New York Philharmonic – Rodzinski
Schoenberg, Arnold	Piano Concerto	1944-02-06	New York City	Steuermann / NBC Symphony – Stokowski
Schoenberg, Arnold	Theme and Variations for Orchestra	1944-10-20	Boston	Boston Symphony – Koussevitzky
Schoenberg, Arnold	Variations on a Recitative (1941)	1944-04-10	New York City	Weinrich
Shostakovich, Dmitri	Piano Trio No. 2	1944-11-14	Leningrad	Tsiganov, Chirinsky, Shostakovich
Shostakovich, Dmitri	String Quartet No. 2	1944-11-14	Leningrad	Beethoven Quartet
Stravinsky, Igor	Norwegian Moods	1944-01-13	Cambridge, Massachusetts	Boston Symphony – Stravinsky
Stravinsky, Igor	Scherzo à la russe (band version)	1944-09-05	New York City	Whiteman Band
Stravinsky, Igor	Sonata for Two Pianos	1944-08-02	Madison, Wisconsin	Boulanger, Johnston
Tippett, Michael	A Child of Our Time, oratorio	1944-03-19	London	Cross, MacArthur, Pears, Lloyd / Morley College Choir / London Philharmonic – Goehr

=== Compositions ===
- George Antheil – Symphony No. 4
- Samuel Barber –
  - Capricorn Concerto, Op. 21, for flute, oboe, trumpet, and string orchestra
  - Excursions, Op. 20, for piano
  - Symphony No. 2, Op. 19
- Béla Bartók – Sonata for solo violin
- Arnold Bax –
  - A Legend, tone poem, for orchestra
  - To Russia, for choir with baritone solo
- Leonard Bernstein – Fancy Free (ballet)
- John Cage –
  - A Book of Music, for two prepared pianos
  - Four Walls, for piano and voice
  - The Perilous Night, suite for prepared piano
  - Prelude for Meditation, for prepared piano
  - Root of an Unfocus, for prepared piano
  - Spontaneous Earth, for prepared piano
  - Triple-Paced No. 2, for prepared piano
  - The Unavailable Memory Of, for prepared piano
  - A Valentine Out of Season, for prepared piano
- Julián Carrillo –
  - Himno a la paz, for two choirs and piano
  - Suite No. 4, for piano
- Elliott Carter –
  - The Difference, for soprano, baritone, and piano
  - The Harmony of Morning, for SSAA choir and small orchestra
  - Holiday Overture
- Carlos Chávez – La hija de Cólquide (ballet)
- Aaron Copland – Appalachian Spring (ballet)
- Henry Cowell –
  - Animal Magic of the Alaskan Esquimo, for band
  - Derwent and the Shining Sword, incidental music
  - Elegie for Hanya Holm, for piano
  - Manaunaun's Birthing, for orchestra
  - Hymn and Fuguing Tune No. 1, for band
  - Hymn and Fuguing Tune No. 2, for string orchestra
  - Hymn and Fuguing Tune No. 3, for orchestra
  - Hymn and Fuguing Tune No. 4, for soprano, alto, and bass recorders, woodwinds, and strings
  - Kansas Fiddler, for piano
  - Mountain Music, for piano
  - The Pasture, for voice and piano
  - Sonatina, for baritone, violin, and piano
- George Crumb – Two Duos for flute and clarinet
- David Diamond – Rounds
- Ernő Dohnányi – Symphony No. 2
- George Enescu – Piano Quartet No. 2 in D minor, Op. 30
- John Fernström – Symphony No. 10
- Vivian Fine – Concertante for Piano and Orchestra
- Gerald Finzi – Farewell to Arms
- Cecil Armstrong Gibbs – Westmoreland Symphony
- Camargo Guarnieri – String Quartet No. 2
- Alois Hába –
  - Milenci (The Lovers), song cycle for soprano and piano, Op. 57
  - Moravian Love-Songs (5), for mezzo-soprano with guitar or piano accompaniment, Op. 58
  - Sonata for chromatic harp, Op. 59
  - Sonata for diatonic harp, Op. 60
  - Suite, for quarter-tone trumpet and trombone, Op. 56
- Paul Hindemith – Hérodiade, ballet, for orchestra
- Vagn Holmboe – Symphony No. 5
- Alan Hovhaness –
  - Armenian Rhapsody No. 1, Op. 45, for percussion and strings
  - Armenian Rhapsody No. 2, Op. 51, for string orchestra
  - Elibris, Op. 50, concerto for flute and strings
  - Khrimian Hairig, Op. 49, for trumpet and strings
  - Lousadzak, Op. 48, concerto for piano and strings
  - Mazert Nman Rehan ("Thy Hair is Like Basil Leaf"), Op. 38, for piano
  - Varak, Op. 47a, for violin and piano
- Jacques Ibert
  - Trio, for violin, cello and harp
  - Petite suite en 15 images, for piano
  - Les Petites du quai aux fleurs, film score
- Joseph Jongen – Concerto for Harp No. 1
- Dmitry Kabalevsky –
  - Easy Pieces (24), Op. 39, for piano
  - Easy Variations, in D major (Toccata) and A minor, Op. 40, for piano
  - Preludes (24), Op. 38, for piano
- Aram Khachaturian –
  - Anthem of the Armenian SSR, for orchestra
  - Choreographic Waltz, for piano
  - Russian Fantasy, for orchestra
  - Suite from Masquerade, for orchestra
  - Symphony No. 2, "The Bell" (second version)
- Zoltán Kodály – Missa Brevis
- Frank Martin – Petite symphonie concertante
- Bohuslav Martinů –
  - Piano Quintet No. 2
  - Písničky na dvě stránky [Songs on Two Pages], for voice and piano
  - Sonata No. 3, for violin and piano
  - Symphony No. 3
  - Trio, for flute, cello, and piano
- Olivier Messiaen – Vingt regards sur l'Enfant-Jésus, for piano
- Darius Milhaud –
  - Air, Op. 242, for viola and orchestra
  - Le bal martiniquais, Op. 249, versions for orchestra and for two pianos
  - Borechou – Schema Israël (Bless Ye the Lord – O Hear, Israel), Op. 239, for cantor, chorus, and organ
  - Caïn et Abel, Op. 241, for reciter and orchestra
  - Jeux de printemps, Op. 243, ballet
  - La libération des Antilles, Op. 246, for voice and piano
  - La muse ménagère, Op. 245, for piano (also orchestrated)
  - Printemps lointain, Op. 253, for voice and piano
  - Sonata No. 1 "sur des thèmes inédits et anonymes de XVIIIe siècle", Op. 240, for viola and piano
  - Sonata No. 2, Op. 244, for viola and piano
  - Suite française, Op. 248, for band or for orchestra
  - Symphony No. 2, Op. 247
- Harry Partch –
  - Yankee Doodle Fantasy
  - Two Settings from Joyce's Finnegans Wake
- Francis Poulenc – Un soir de neige, for six-part choir
- Sergei Prokofiev –
  - Adagio, for cello and piano, Op. 97bis
  - Cinderella, Op. 87, ballet, for orchestra
  - March in B-flat, Op. 99, for band
  - Piano Sonata No. 8 in B-flat major, Op. 84
  - Pieces (6) from Cinderella, Op. 102, for piano
  - Russian Folksongs (12), Op. 104, for voice and piano
  - Symphony No. 5, in B-flat major, Op. 100
- Dmitri Shostakovich –
  - Trio for violin, cello and piano No. 2 E minor, Op. 67
  - String Quartet No. 2 in A major, Op. 68
- Igor Stravinsky –
  - Babel, for choir
  - Elegy, for solo viola
  - Scherzo à la russe, for orchestra
  - Scènes de ballet, for orchestra
- Stjepan Šulek – First Symphony
- Michael Tippett –
  - Plebs Angelica, motet for double choir
  - The Weeping Babe, motet for soprano and SATB choir
- Ralph Vaughan Williams – Oboe Concerto
- Heitor Villa-Lobos –
  - Bachianas Brasileiras No. 8, for orchestra
  - String Quartet No. 8
  - Symphony No. 2 Asenção (Ascension), revised or completed
  - Symphony No. 6 – Sobre a linha das montanhas do Brasil (On the Outline of the Mountains of Brazil)
- William Walton – Lai and Rondet de carol, for piano
- Grace Williams – Sea Sketches

== Film ==
- Erich Korngold – Between Two Worlds (1944 film)
- Sergei Prokofiev – Ivan the Terrible (1944 film)
- David Raksin – Laura (1944 film)
- Hilding Rosenberg - Torment
- Miklós Rózsa - Double Indemnity
- William Walton - Henry V

== Musical theater ==
- Bloomer Girl Broadway production opened at the Shubert Theatre on October 5 and ran for 654 performances.
- Follow The Girls Broadway production opened at the New Century Theatre on April 8 and ran for 882 performances.
- Jenny Jones London production opened at the London Hippodrome on October 2 and ran for 153 performances
- Mexican Hayride Broadway production opened at the Winter Garden Theatre on January 28 and transferred to the Majestic Theatre on December 18 for a total run of 481 performances
- A Night In Venice (Johann Strauss II) London production opened at the Cambridge Theatre on May 25
- On the Town (Leonard Bernstein, Betty Comden and Adolph Green) – Broadway production opened at the Adelphi Theatre (New York) on December 28, transferred to the 44th Street Theatre on June 4, 1945, and transferred to the Martin Beck Theatre on July 30, 1945, for a total run of 462 performances.
- Seven Lively Arts Broadway production opened at the Ziegfeld Theatre on December 7 and ran for 183 performances
- Song Of Norway Broadway production opened at the Imperial Theatre on August 21 and transferred to the Broadway Theatre on April 15, 1946, for a total run of 860 performances
- Sweeter And Lower London production

== Musical films ==
- Allergic to Love starring Noah Beery Jr., Martha O'Driscoll, David Bruce, Franklin Pangborn and Maxie Rosenbloom. Directed by Edward Lilley.
- And the Angels Sing starring Dorothy Lamour, Fred MacMurray and Betty Hutton. Directed by Claude Binyon.
- Babes on Swing Street starring Ann Blyth, Peggy Ryan and Andy Devine and featuring Marion Hutton and Freddie Slack & his Orchestra. Directed by Edward Lilley.
- Bees in Paradise released March 20 starring Arthur Askey, Anne Shelton, Ronald Shiner and Jean Kent
- Belle of the Yukon starring Randolph Scott, Gypsy Rose Lee, Dinah Shore and Bob Burns.
- Can't Help Singing starring Deanna Durbin, Robert Paige and Akim Tamiroff
- Carolina Blues starring Ann Miller and Kay Kyser & his band
- Champagne Charlie starring Tommy Trinder
- Cover Girl starring Rita Hayworth, Gene Kelly, Phil Silvers, Lee Bowman, Jinx Falkenburg, Otto Kruger and Eve Arden. Directed by Charles Vidor.
- Gharam Wa Intiqam, starring Asmahan
- Here Come the Waves starring Bing Crosby, Betty Hutton and Sonny Tufts.
- Hey, Rookie starring Ann Miller and Larry Parks
- Hollywood Canteen starring Jack Benny, Eddie Cantor, Joan Crawford, Bette Davis, Roy Rogers, Barbara Stanwyck and Jane Wyman and featuring The Andrews Sisters, Jimmy Dorsey & his Orchestra and Carmen Cavallaro & his Orchestra. Directed by Delmer Daves.
- Jam Session starring Ann Miller and featuring Louis Armstrong & his Orchestra, Alvino Rey & his Orchestra and Charlie Barnet & his Orchestra
- Knickerbocker Holiday starring Nelson Eddy and Charles Coburn
- Lady In The Dark starring Ginger Rogers and Ray Milland
- Lost in a Harem starring Bud Abbott, Lou Costello, Marilyn Maxwell and John Conte, and featuring Jimmy Dorsey & his Orchestra. Directed by Charles Reisner.
- Meet Me in St. Louis starring Judy Garland, Mary Astor, Tom Drake, Lucille Bremer and Margaret O'Brien. Directed by Vincente Minnelli.
- Meet Miss Bobby Sox starring Bob Crosby, Lynn Merrick and Louise Erickson and featuring Louis Jordan & His Tympany Five. Directed by Glenn Tryon.
- The Merry Monahans starring Donald O'Connor, Peggy Ryan, Jack Oakie, Rosemary DeCamp, Ann Blyth and Isabel Jewell
- Minstrel Man starring Benny Fields and Gladys George
- One Exciting Night starring Vera Lynn
- Pardon My Rhythm starring Gloria Jean, Patric Knowles and Mel Torme and featuring Bob Crosby & his Orchestra. Directed by Felix E. Feist.
- Rainbow Island starring Dorothy Lamour and Eddie Bracken
- Shine on Harvest Moon starring Ann Sheridan, Dennis Morgan and Jack Carson.
- Something for the Boys released November 1 starring Carmen Miranda, Phil Silvers, Vivian Blaine and Perry Como.
- Step Lively starring Frank Sinatra, Gloria DeHaven, George Murphy and Anne Jeffreys.
- Sweet and Low-Down starring Benny Goodman & his Orchestra, Linda Darnell, Jack Oakie and Lynn Bari
- Swing in the Saddle starring Jane Frazee, The Hoosier Hot Shots, Cousin Emmy and featuring The King Cole Trio and Jimmy Wakely & his Oklahoma Cowboys
- Take It Big starring Jack Haley, Harriet Hilliard, Mary Beth Hughes and Richard Lane and featuring Ozzie Nelson & his Orchestra. Directed by Frank McDonald.
- Time Flies starring Tommy Handley and Evelyn Dall
- Two Girls and a Sailor starring June Allyson, Gloria DeHaven and Van Johnson
- You Can't Ration Love starring Betty Jane Rhodes and Johnny Johnston. Directed by Lester Fuller.

== Births ==
- January 2 – Péter Eötvös, Hungarian composer, conductor and teacher (died 2024)
- January 3 – David Atherton, British conductor
- January 6 – Alan Stivell, French folk musician
- January 9
  - Jimmy Page, English guitarist (Led Zeppelin)
  - Scott Walker, American-born British singer (died 2019)
- January 10 – Frank Sinatra, Jr., American singer (died 2016)
- January 12 – Cynthia Robinson, American trumpeter and ad-lib vocalist (Sly and the Family Stone, Graham Central Station) (died 2015)
- January 16 – Jim Stafford, American singer-songwriter and musician
- January 17 – Françoise Hardy, French singer (died 2024)
- January 19 – Shelley Fabares, American actress and singer
- January 27 – Nick Mason, English rock drummer (Pink Floyd)
- January 28 – John Tavener, composer (died 2013)
- February 2 – Andrew Davis, conductor (died 2024)
- February 3 – Trisha Noble, singer and actress
- February 4 – Florence LaRue, American singer and actress (The 5th Dimension)
- February 5 – Al Kooper, musician, songwriter and record producer (Blood, Sweat & Tears)
- February 7 – Antoni Wit, Polish conductor and composer
- February 10
  - Rufus Reid, American bassist and composer (The Thad Jones/Mel Lewis Orchestra)
  - Clifford T. Ward, singer-songwriter (died 2001)
- February 12 – Moe Bandy, American singer and guitarist
- February 15 – Mick Avory, drummer (The Kinks)
- February 17 – Karl Jenkins, composer
- February 20 – Lew Soloff, jazz trumpeter, composer and actor (Blood, Sweat & Tears)
- February 22 - Mick Green
- February 23
  - Mike Maxfield, lead guitarist (The Dakotas)
  - Johnny Winter, blues guitarist, singer and producer (died 2014)
- February 24
  - Nicky Hopkins, keyboard player and session musician (died 1994)
  - Paul Jones, R&B singer, actor and broadcaster
- March 1
  - Mike d'Abo, English vocalist (Manfred Mann)
  - Roger Daltrey, English vocalist (The Who)
- March 2 – Leif Segerstam, Finnish composer and conductor (died 2024)
- March 4 – Bobby Womack, American singer-songwriter (died 2014)
- March 6
  - Kiri Te Kanawa, New Zealand operatic soprano
  - Mary Wilson, American singer (The Supremes) (died 2021)
- March 8 - Carole Bayer Sager, American lyricist, singer, songwriter
- March 17
  - Pattie Boyd, English sometime wife and muse of both George Harrison and Eric Clapton
  - John Lill, British pianist
  - John Sebastian, American songwriter and harmonica player (The Lovin' Spoonful)
- March 23
  - Michael Nyman, English composer
  - Ric Ocasek, American new wave singer-songwriter (The Cars) (died 2019)
- March 26 – Diana Ross, American singer
- March 29 – Terry Jacks, Canadian singer-songwriter, producer and environmentalist
- March 31 – Mick Ralphs, British rock guitarist and singer (Bad Company, Mott The Hoople) (died 2025)
- April 3 – Tony Orlando, singer
- April 5 – Crispian St. Peters, singer (died 2010)
- April 6
  - Felicity Palmer, operatic mezzo-soprano
  - Michelle Phillips, actress and vocalist (The Mamas & the Papas)
- April 12 – John Kay, singer-songwriter and guitarist (Steppenwolf)
- April 13 – Brian Pendleton, original member of The Pretty Things (died 2001)
- April 13 – Jack Casady, bass guitarist (Jefferson Airplane)
- April 15 – Dave Edmunds, rock singer and guitarist
- April 17 – Bobby Curtola, pop singer and teen idol (died 2016)
- April 18 – Skip Spence, singer-songwriter (Moby Grape) (died 1999)
- April 27 – Cuba Gooding Sr., lead singer (The Main Ingredient) (died 2017)
- May 9 – Richie Furay, country musician and singer (Buffalo Springfield)
- May 12 – James Purify, singer (died 2021)
- May 14 – Gene Cornish, guitarist (The Rascals)
- May 16 – Billy Cobham, Panamanian-American drummer, composer, and bandleader
- May 17 – Jesse Winchester, musician and songwriter
- May 20
  - Joe Cocker, English singer (died 2014)
  - Boudewijn de Groot, Dutch singer
- May 21 – Marcie Blane, singer
- May 23 – Tiki Fulwood, American R&B/funk/jazz drummer (died 1979)
- May 24 – Patti LaBelle, singer
- May 25 – Charlie Harper, singer, songwriter (U.K. Subs)
- May 26 – Verden Allen, British rock organist and singer (Mott The Hoople)
- May 28
  - Gladys Knight, singer
  - Billy Vera, singer, actor and writer
- June 2 – Marvin Hamlisch, songwriter and composer (died 2012)
- June 6 – Edgar Froese, electronic music pioneer (Tangerine Dream)
- June 7 – Clarence White (The Byrds), guitarist (Nashville West) (died 1973)
- June 8 – Boz Scaggs, singer-songwriter
- June 17 – Chris Spedding, guitarist and songwriter
- June 21 – Ray Davies, singer-songwriter (The Kinks)
- June 22 – Peter Asher, singer and record producer (Peter and Gordon)
- June 23 – Rosetta Hightower, singer (died 2014)
- June 24
  - Jeff Beck, rock guitarist (died 2023)
  - Arthur Brown, rock singer (The Crazy World of Arthur Brown)
  - Chris Wood, rock musician (Traffic) (died 1983)
- June 26 – Arthur Doyle, American singer-songwriter, saxophonist and flautist (died 2014)
- June 30 – Glenn Shorrock, singer-songwriter (Little River Band)
- July 6 – Byron Berline, American fiddler (The Flying Burrito Brothers)
- July 8
  - Jai Johanny Johanson, drummer (The Allman Brothers Band)
  - Michael Johnson, singer-songwriter and guitarist (died 2017)
- July 22 – Rick Davies, keyboardist (Supertramp)
- July 26 – Betty Davis, funk and soul singer
- July 27 – Bobbie Gentry, singer-songwriter
- July 30 – Jimmy Cliff, reggae singer and musician (died 2025)
- August 2 – Jim Capaldi, drummer and singer-songwriter (Traffic) (died 2005)
- August 3 – Nino Bravo, singer (died 1973)
- August 12 – Larry Troutman, R&B musician (Zapp) (died 1999)
- August 18 – Carl Wayne, vocalist (The Move) (died 2004)
- August 19 – Eddy Raven, country musician
- August 26 – Alan Parker, guitarist and composer
- August 27 – Tim Bogert, bass guitarist (Vanilla Fudge) (died 2021)
- September 1
  - Archie Bell, R&B singer-songwriter (Archie Bell & the Drells)
  - Leonard Slatkin, conductor (Detroit Symphony Orchestra)
- September 3 – Gary Leeds (The Walker Brothers)
- September 4 – Gene Parsons (The Byrds) (The Flying Burrito Brothers)
- September 12 – Barry White, soul singer-songwriter and record producer (died 2003)
- September 13 – Peter Cetera, vocalist (Chicago)
- September 16
  - Winston Grennan, drummer (died 2000)
  - Betty Kelly (Martha and the Vandellas)
- September 23 – Ivan Martin Jirous, poet and musician (The Plastic People of the Universe)
- September 29
  - Tommy Boyce, songwriter (died 1994)
  - Mike Post, TV theme composer
- October 7 – Judee Sill, singer-songwriter (died 1979)
- October 9
  - John Entwistle, bassist (The Who) (died 2002)
  - Nona Hendryx, singer-songwriter, author and actress
- October 13 – Robert Lamm, keyboardist and singer-songwriter (Chicago)
- October 16 – Patsy Watchorn, folk musician
- October 19
  - George McCrae, soul and disco singer
  - Peter Tosh, reggae musician (died 1987)
- October 24 - Bettye Swann, soul singer
- October 25 – Jon Anderson, lead singer (Yes)
- October 26 – Jim McCann, folk musician (died 2015)
- October 29 – Denny Laine, rock singer-songwriter, guitarist & multi-instrumentalist (The Moody Blues, Wings) (died 2023)
- October 30 – Kiril Marichkov, Bulgarian rock musician (died 2024)
- November 2 – Keith Emerson, keyboardist and composer (Emerson, Lake & Palmer) (died 2016)
- November 8 – Bonnie Bramlett, singer (Delaney & Bonnie)
- November 10 – Sir Tim Rice, lyricist
- November 11 – Jennifer Bate, concert organist (died 2020)
- November 12 – Booker T. Jones, musician, record producer, composer and arranger
- November 17 – Gene Clark, singer-songwriter (The Byrds) (died 1991)
- November 25 – Bev Bevan, drummer and vocalist (The Move) (Electric Light Orchestra), drummer (Black Sabbath)
- November 26 – Jean Terrell, singer
- November 28 – R. B. Greaves, singer
- December 1 – John Densmore, rock drummer (The Doors)
- December 3 – António Variações, Portuguese singer-songwriter (died 1984)
- December 4
  - Dennis Wilson, singer-songwriter and drummer (The Beach Boys) (died 1983)
  - Chris Hillman, country rock bassist (The Byrds, The Flying Burrito Brothers, The Desert Rose Band)
- December 6 – Jonathan King, singer-songwriter and record producer
- December 7 – Daniel Chorzempa, organist
- December 9
  - Shirley Brickley, R&B singer (The Orlons) (murdered 1977)
  - Neil Innes, singer-songwriter and comedian (died 2019)
- December 11 – Brenda Lee, singer
- December 12 – Rob Tyner, singer-songwriter and bass player (MC5) (died 1991)
- December 16 – John Abercrombie, jazz guitarist (died 2017)
- December 19
  - William Christie, harpsichordist and conductor
  - Alvin Lee, guitarist and singer (Ten Years After) (died 2013)
  - María Martha Serra Lima, ballad and bolero singer (died 2017)
  - Zal Yanovsky, guitarist and singer (The Lovin' Spoonful) (died 2002)
- December 20 – Bobby Colomby, drummer (Blood, Sweat & Tears)
- December 21 – Michael Tilson Thomas, conductor (died 2026)
- December 22 – Barry Jenkins, drummer (The Animals) (died 2024)
- December 25
  - Henry Vestine, guitarist (Canned Heat) (died 1997)
  - John Edwards, soul singer (The Spinners) (died 2025)
- December 27 – Mick Jones, guitarist, songwriter and record producer (Foreigner)

== Deaths ==
- January 9 – Johanna Beyer, pianist and composer (born 1888)
- January 25 – Luise Greger, pianist and composer (born 1862)
- January 29 – Carl Aeschbacher, choirmaster and composer (born 1886)
- February 4 – Yvette Guilbert, cabaret singer and actress (born 1865)
- February 7 – Lina Cavalieri, opera singer (born 1874)
- April 4 – Alma Rosé, violinist and composer (born 1906) (food poisoning or typhoid at Auschwitz concentration camp)
- April 13 – Cécile Chaminade, composer and pianist (born 1857)
- April 19 – Jimmie Noone, jazz musician (born 1895)
- April 23 – Marion Harris, jazz singer (born 1896) (hotel fire)
- May 6 – Carl Engel, composer (born 1883)
- May 9 – Dame Ethel Smyth, composer (born 1858)
- May 16 – Leone Sinigaglia, composer (born 1868)
- May 20 – Vincent Rose, Italian-born US bandleader and composer (born 1880)
- June 2 – Zikmund Schul, composer (born 1916) (tuberculosis)
- June 5 – Riccardo Zandonai, opera composer (born 1883)
- June 10 – Sylvio Lazzari, composer (born 1857)
- June 25 – Lucha Reyes, Mexican singer (born 1906) (suicide)
- July 4 – Alice Burville, singer and actress (born 1856)
- July 14 – Asmahan, Syrian singer and actress (born 1912) (drowned)
- July 19 – Will Marion Cook, violinist and composer (born 1869)
- August 1 – Cecil Mack, songwriter and music publisher (born 1883)
- August 7 – Agustin Barrios, composer (born 1885)
- August 8 – Aino Ackté, operatic soprano (born 1876)
- August 12 – James Simon, pianist, composer and musicologist (born 1880) (killed at Auschwitz concentration camp)
- August 19 – Sir Henry Wood, conductor (born 1869)
- September 24 – Olga Islar, operatic soprano (born 1865) (killed at Theresienstadt Ghetto)
- October 1 – Carlo Sigmund Taube, pianist, conductor and composer (born 1897) (killed at Auschwitz concentration camp)
- October 16 – Hans Krása, Czech-German composer (born 1899) (gassed in Auschwitz)
- October 17 – Pavel Haas, Czech composer (born 1899) (gassed in Auschwitz)
- October 18 – Orville "Hoppy" Jones, bass singer and cellist of The Ink Spots (born 1905) (dies in New York City)
- November 14 – Carl Flesch, violinist (born 1873)
- November 26 – Florence Foster Jenkins, soprano famous for her lack of musical ability (born 1868)
- November 27 – Margarete Dessoff, conductor, singer and voice teacher (born 1874)
- November 30 – Antoine Mariotte, conductor and composer (born 1875)
- December 2 – Josef Lhévinne, pianist (born 1874)
- December 15 – Glenn Miller, trombonist, composer and bandleader (born 1904) (missing in action)
- December 27 – Amy Beach, composer and pianist (born 1867)
- date unknown – Lalla Miranda, coloratura soprano (born 1874)
