= Scherzo à la russe =

Scherzo à la russe may refer to:

- Scherzo à la russe (Tchaikovsky) – a piano piece by Pyotr Ilyich Tchaikovsky
- Scherzo à la russe (Stravinsky) – a piece for jazz band (and later arranged for symphony orchestra) by Igor Stravinsky
- Scherzo à la Russe (ballet) – a ballet by George Balanchine
