= Ebony Concerto (Stravinsky) =

Composition for solo clarinet and jazz ensemble by Igor Stravinsky

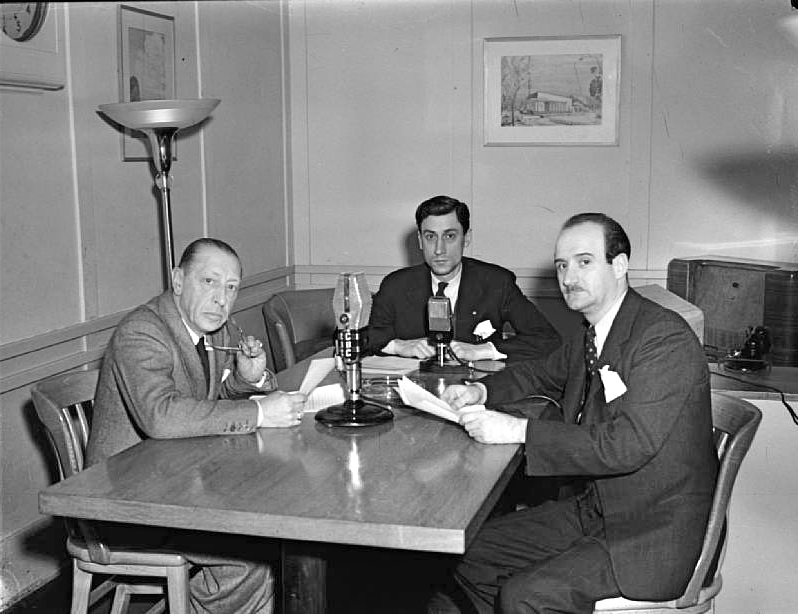
Stravinsky (left) in 1945

Ebony Concerto is a musical composition by Igor Stravinsky, commissioned by jazz musician Woody Herman and completed on December 1, 1945. It is one in a series of compositions requested by Herman for solo clarinetist and jazz ensemble and the score is dedicated to Herman. The composition was first performed on March 25, 1946, in Carnegie Hall in New York City, by Woody Herman's Band, conducted by Walter Hendl.

== History ==
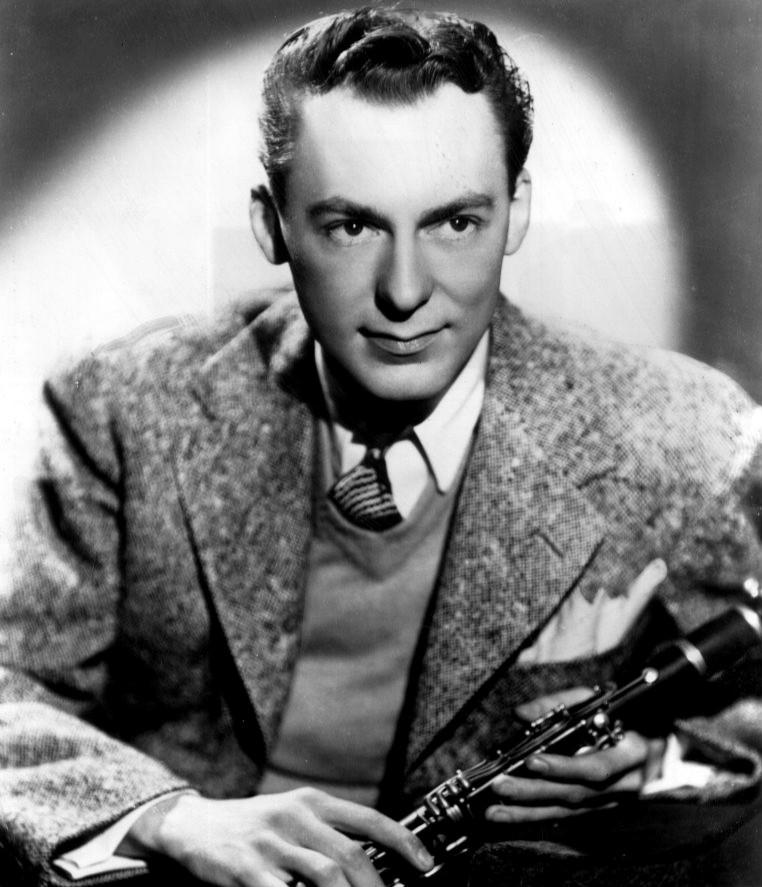
Woody Herman in 1943

Stravinsky's engagement with jazz dates back to the closing years of the First World War, the major jazz-inspired works of that period being L'histoire du soldat, the Ragtime for eleven instruments, and the Piano-Rag-Music. Although traces of jazz elements, especially blues and boogie-woogie, can be found in his music throughout the 1920s and 1930s, it was only with the Ebony Concerto that Stravinsky once again incorporated features of jazz into a composition on a far-reaching scale. The title was originally suggested to Stravinsky by Aaron Goldmark, of Leeds Music Corporation, who had negotiated the commission and suggested the form it should take. The composer explained that his title does not refer to the clarinet, as might be supposed, but rather to Africa, because "the jazz performers I most admired at that time were Art Tatum, Charlie Parker, and the guitarist Charles Christian. And blues meant African culture to me."

The official blurb published with the score says that Stravinsky had been so impressed with recordings of the Herman band, such as "Bijou", "Goosey Gander", and "Caldonia", that, when asked, he agreed to write a piece for them with a solo clarinet part for Herman. However, according to Herman's trumpeter and arranger Neal Hefti, this story may be somewhat embroidered. Hefti and his trumpeter colleague, Pete Candoli, were both great fans of Stravinsky's music, so after Hefti returned to the band after six months spent in California working in the film industry, Candoli wanted to know if he had met the great man. Hefti had not, but pretended he had done so, and he embellished his story by claiming, "I played him the records [of the Herman band], and he thinks they're great." The rumor quickly spread, and within two days the publisher Lou Levy of Leeds Music had arranged for Herman to contact Stravinsky (who probably had never heard the Herman band up to that point), and this led to the commission of the concerto.

Once having accepted the commission, Stravinsky decided to create a jazz-based version of a concerto grosso, with a blues as the slow movement. If he had not previously heard them, he now listened to recordings of the Herman band, and went so far as to consult a saxophonist in order to learn how the instrument is fingered. The project nearly foundered when a publicity story was published in September 1945, claiming a "collaboration" between Stravinsky and Herman. Stravinsky withdrew from the agreement until his lawyer, Aaron Sapiro, convinced him that no offense had been intended. The score of the first two movements was delivered to Herman on November 22, 1945, and the finale followed on December 10. In February 1946 the composer chose Walter Hendl, assistant conductor of the New York Philharmonic, to conduct the premiere at Carnegie Hall the following month, but Stravinsky himself first rehearsed the band—backstage at New York's Paramount Theatre, where they were appearing at the time.

Herman found the solo part frighteningly difficult, and did not feel that Stravinsky had really adapted his writing to the jazz-band idiom. Instead, he "wrote pure Stravinsky", and the band did not feel at all comfortable with the score initially. "After the very first rehearsal, at which we were all so embarrassed we were nearly crying because nobody could read, he walked over and put his arm around me and said, 'Ah, what a beautiful family you have.'"

== Instrumentation ==
The Ebony Concerto is scored for solo clarinet in B♭ and a jazz band consisting of two alto saxophones in E♭, two tenor saxophones in B♭, baritone saxophone in E♭, three clarinets in B♭ (doubled by first and second alto and first tenor saxophone players), bass clarinet in B♭ (doubled by second tenor saxophone), horn in F, five trumpets in B♭, three trombones, piano, harp, guitar, double bass, and drum set.

The horn and harp were additions to the normal make-up of the Herman band. Stravinsky's original plan was to include an oboe as well, but this instrument did not survive into the final version of the score.

== Structure ==
The piece has three movements:

1. Allegro moderato = 88
2. Andante = 84
3. Moderato = 84. Con moto = 132

The first movement is a sonata-allegro in B♭ major with a second subject in E♭ major. The second movement is a blues in F minor, turning to F major at the end. The finale is a theme and variations with a coda. The final variation, marked "Vivo", features the solo clarinet in one last virtuoso display.

Amongst Stravinsky's compositions using variation form, the concerto is unusual for several reasons. First, it employs this form as a finale. Second, the variation movement begins and ends in the same key (which would be normal for most composers, but not Stravinsky, who only adheres to this practice in one other composition, the Sonata for Two Pianos). Third, the second variation literally repeats the melodic theme, thus functioning as a sort of internal recapitulation and thereby suggesting a fusing of variation with rondo form.

== Recordings ==
On November 4, 1945, while still in the midst of composing the concerto, Stravinsky wrote a letter to Nadia Boulanger describing his progress as well as plans to make a recording with the Herman band in February 1946. This recording session was ultimately postponed but, at that time, Stravinsky foresaw its release on a 78-rpm disc, with the first two movements on one side and the theme and variations on the other. He expected the durations of the three movements to be just two-and-a-half, two, and three minutes.

On 19 August 1946, the day after performing the piece together on a "Columbia Workshop" national broadcast, Herman and Stravinsky recorded the concerto in Hollywood, California. Stravinsky felt that the jazz musicians would have a hard time with the various time signatures, as this was more than a decade before Dave Brubeck started using unusual time signatures in jazz performance and virtually all jazz was played in 4/4. Saxophonist Flip Phillips said that "during the rehearsal [...] there was a passage I had to play there and I was playing it soft, and Stravinsky said, 'Play it, here I am!' and I blew it louder and he threw me a kiss!'" In the late 1950s Herman made a second recording, in stereo, in the Belock Recording Studio at Bayside New York, calling it a "very delicate and a very sad piece".

On April 27, 1965, Stravinsky recorded it again with Benny Goodman and the Columbia Jazz Ensemble at the CBS Studio at 230 East 30th Street in New York, or possibly in Hollywood. A comparison of an earlier CD reissue of this recording (CBS MK 42227) with the version issued in 2007 as part of the Works of Igor Stravinsky 22-CD boxed set (Sony Classical 88697103112) suggests that, though both are oddly balanced, a remix has both reduced the clarity of the recording and resulted in a version in which "the gracious soloist appears gradually to fade from the spotlight".

Other conductors who have recorded this work include Pierre Boulez (1982), Simon Rattle (1987 and 2018), Vladimir Ashkenazy (1992), and Michael Tilson Thomas (1998).

== Ballet ==
In 1957, choreographer Alan Carter set the Ebony Concerto (along with Stravinsky's Circus Polka, Fireworks, and Ode) to a ballet titled Feuilleton, which was danced at the Bayerische Staatsoper in Munich. In 1960, the concerto was music for a ballet production by the New York City Ballet, with choreography by John Taras and costumes and décor by David Hays.

== Sources ==
- Anon. 1971. "New LP/Tape Releases". Billboard 83, no. 33 (August 14): 45.
- Clancy, William D., and Audree Coke Kenton. Woody Herman: Chronicles of the Herds, with a foreword by Steve Allen. New York: Schirmer Books; London: Prentice Hall International, 1995. ISBN 9780028704968.
- Gitler, Ira. 1985. Swing to Bop: An Oral History of the Transition in Jazz in the 1940s. Oxford University Press. ISBN 978-0-19-503664-0; ISBN 978-0-19-505070-7 (pbk.)
- Hollerbach, Peter. 1989. "The Genesis of Stravinsky's Ebony Concerto". Peabody Essays in Music History, no. 2 (February): 37–79.
- Hunkemöller, Jürgen. 1972. "Igor Strawinskys Jazz-Porträt". Archiv für Musikwissenschaft 29, no. 1:45–63.
- Maconie, Robin. 2013. Experiencing Stravinsky. The Listener's Companion. Lanham, Toronto, Plymouth: The Scarecrow Press. ISBN 978-0-8108-8430-4.
- Nelson, Robert U. 1962. "Stravinsky's Concept of Variations". Musical Quarterly 48, no. 3 (July): 327–39.
- Stuart, Philip. Igor Stravinsky: The Composer in the Recording Studio: A Comprehensive Discography. Studies in Historiography: Discographies 45. New York: Greenwood Press, 1991. ISBN 978-0-313-27958-4
- Stravinsky, Igor. 1982. Selected Correspondence, Volume 1, edited and with commentaties by Robert Craft. London: Faber and Faber; New York: Alfred A. Knopf. ISBN 0-394-51870-5
- Stravinsky, Igor. 1984. Selected Correspondence, Volume 2, edited and with commentaties by Robert Craft. London: Faber and Faber; New York: Alfred A. Knopf. ISBN 0-394-52813-1
- Stravinsky, Igor, and Robert Craft. 1968. Dialogues and a Diary. London: Faber and Faber. Expanded from the American edition, Garden City, NY: Doubleday, 1963.
- Stravinsky, Vera, and Robert Craft. 1978. Stravinsky in Pictures and Documents. New York: Simon and Schuster. ISBN 0-671-24382-9
- White, Eric Walter. 1979. Stravinsky: The Composer and His Works, second edition. Berkeley and Los Angeles: The University of California Press. ISBN 0-520-03985-8.
