= String Quartet No. 3 (Villa-Lobos) =

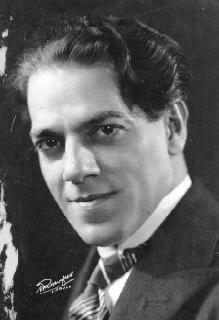
Heitor Villa-Lobos

String Quartet No. 3 ("Quarteto de pipocas"—"Popcorn" Quartet) is the third of 17 works in the medium by the Brazilian composer Heitor Villa-Lobos. Because of the persistent percussive pizzicato patter in the second, scherzo movement, Villa-Lobos gave it the onomatopoeic, alliterative nickname "pipocas e potócas" (popcorn and tall tales), and this nickname is also applied to the entire quartet.

Villa-Lobos composed his Third Quartet in Rio de Janeiro in March 1916. It was first performed on 2 November 1919 at the Theatro Municipal, Rio de Janeiro, by a quartet consisting of Pery Machado and Mario Ronchini, violins, Orlando Frederico, viola, and Newton Pádua, cello. The first North American performance took place on 16 January 1933 in Hollywood, by Samuel Albert and Doris Cheney, violins, Raymond Menhennick, viola, and Lysbeth LeFevre, cello. The UK premiere was given by the Stratton String Quartet (George Stratton and Carl Taylor, violins; Watson Forbes, viola; John Moore, cello) on 9 January 1934, at the Wigmore Hall, London.

A typical performance lasts approximately twenty-three minutes.

== Analysis ==
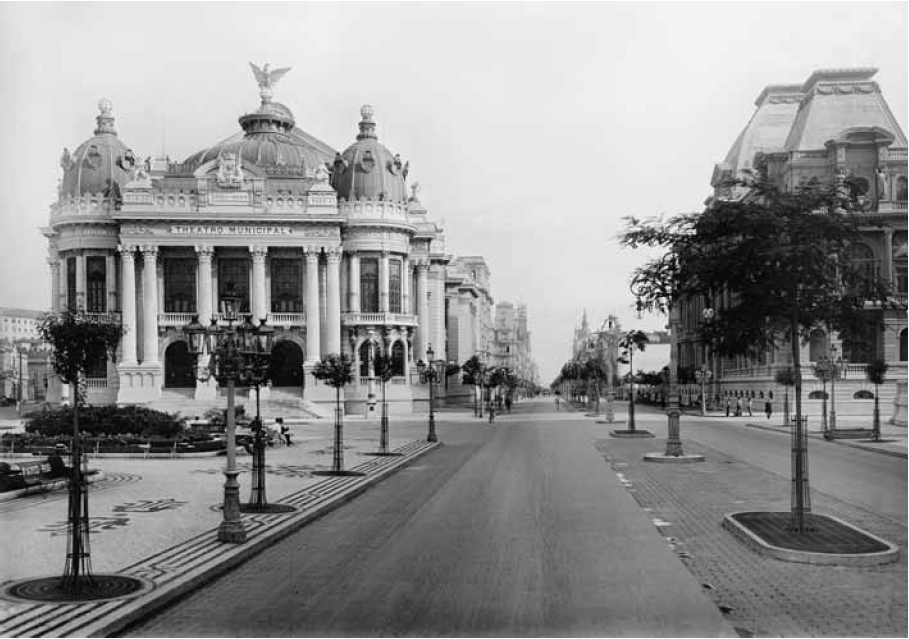
Theatro Municipal, Rio de Janeiro, venue for the Third Quartet's premiere

The quartet, like all but the first of Villa-Lobos's works in the medium, consists of four movements:

1. Allegro non troppo
2. Molto vivo
3. Molto adagio
4. Allegro con fuoco

The opening of the first movement establishes a motive that recurs throughout the quartet in various transformations. At first, it recalls Prokofiev or Shostakovich, but later is given a context more suggestive of Ravel. The generally pentatonic melodic contours and long ostinatos initially tend toward monotony and inexpressiveness, but the ostinatos give way to a more plastic and lively treatment later in the movement.

The second movement, Molto vivo, was listed in the programme for the premiere performance as "Scherzo satirico". Like the first movement, it is largely dependent on ostinatos, but in place of pentatonic melodies its thematic material utilizes the whole-tone scale. The third, slow movement, transforms the leitmotif into something resembling the theme of the piano piece Lenda do caboclo. The finale restates motives from all of the preceding parts, especially the main subject of the first movement, to produce a cyclic formal closure. However, despite this motivic cross-referencing, Villa-Lobos does not take advantage of the possibilities this offers for the kind of rich thematic development found in the Viennese classical masters.

Lisa Peppercorn agrees with Tarasti's assessment, stating that Villa-Lobos rarely develops his musical ideas, but instead uses them as stereotyped, repeated formulas, in contrast to composers who relate their different themes, or have evolved them all from a common germ cell. With specific reference to the Third Quartet, she finds the thematic material is "clearly stated and is obviously suitable for development", but that Villa-Lobos fails to provide this development, which is essential to sonata form, instead letting the themes "take their course through the instruments exactly as they were originally conceived". Paulo Salles, however, contests this view. According to his analysis, both of the main themes of the first movement are taken from the same germ motive, which permeates not only the exposition but the entire first movement of the quartet, "in a process of continuous variation", and compares this high thematic density to the music of Joseph Haydn.

Villa-Lobos emphasizes the beginning of the recapitulation in the first movement with a sudden change of register of the accompanying triplets. At bar 153 (rehearsal-number 12), over an augmentation of the first cyclic theme, he introduces for the first time a figuration evoking the call of a Brazilian bird called sabiá da mata (English name: cocoa thrush). This call occurs in several of Villa-Lobos's later works, including the Fourth and Eighth String Quartets, but most notably in the second movement (Dança: Martelo) of the Bachianas Brasileiras No. 5, where text by Manuel Bandeira names the bird. This is the only moment in this quartet where there is any hint of nationalism.

== Discography ==
Chronological, by date of recording.

- Villa-Lobos: Quatuors a Cordes Nos. 1–2–3. Quatuor Bessler-Reis (Bernardo Bessler, Michel Bessler, violins; Marie-Christine Springuel, viola; Alceu Reis, cello). Recorded at Studios Master in Rio de Janeiro, July 1988 and September –December 1989. CD recording, 1 disc: digital, 12 cm, stereo. Le Chant du Monde LDC 278 1052. [S.l.]: [S.n.], 1991.
  - Also issued as part of Villa-Lobos: Os 17 quartetos de cordas / The 17 String Quartets. Quarteto Bessler-Reis and Quarteto Amazônia. CD recording, 6 sound discs: digital, 12 cm, stereo. Kuarup Discos KCX-1001 (KCD 045, M-KCD-034, KCD 080/1, KCD-051, KCD 042). Rio de Janeiro: Kuarup Discos, 1996.
- Heitor Villa-Lobos: String Quartets Nos. 3, 10 and 15. Danubius Quartet (Gyöngyvér Oláh [Quartets 3 and 10], Judit Tóth [Quartet 15] and Adél Miklós, violins; Cecilia Bodolai, viola; Ilona Ribli, cello). Recorded at the Rottenbiller Street Studio in Budapest, 15–19 June and 1–2 July 1992. CD recording, 1 disc: digital, 12 cm, stereo. Marco Polo 8.223393. A co-production with Records International. Germany: HH International, Ltd., 1993.
- Villa-Lobos: String Quartets, Volume 2. Quartets Nos. 3, 8, 14. Cuarteto Latinoamericano (Saúl Bitrán, Arón Bitrán, violins; Javier Montiel, viola; Alvaro Bitrán, cello). Recorded at the Troy Savings Bank Music Hall in Troy, NY, March 1995. Music of Latin American Masters. CD recording, 1 disc: digital, 12 cm, stereo. Dorian DOR-90220. Troy, NY: Dorian Recordings, 1996.
  - Reissued as part of Heitor Villa-Lobos: The Complete String Quartets. 6 CDs + 1 DVD with a performance of Quartet No. 1 and interview with the Cuarteto Latinoamericano. Dorian Sono Luminus. DSL-90904. Winchester, VA: Sono Luminus, 2009.
  - Also reissued (without the DVD) on Brilliant Classics 6634.

== Filmography ==
- Villa-Lobos: A integral dos quartetos de cordas. Quarteto Radamés Gnattali (Carla Rincón, Francisco Roa, violins; Fernando Thebaldi, viola; Hugo Pilger, cello); presented by Turibio Santos. Recorded from June 2010 to September 2011 at the Palácio do Catete, Palácio das Laranjeiras, and the Theatro Municipal, Rio de Janeiro. DVD and Blu-ray (VIBD11111), 3 discs. Rio de Janeiro: Visom Digital, 2012.
