= Letter from Home =

Letter(s) from Home may refer to:

- Letters from Home (film), a 1996 short film by Mike Hoolboom
- "Letters from Home", a 1984 episode of Voltron
- Letters from Home, a book by Karen Joy Fowler
- Letters from Home, a novel by Kristina McMorris

== Music ==
- Letter from Home (Copland), wartime orchestral composition by Aaron Copland
- Letter from Home (album), a 1989 album by Pat Metheny Group
- Letters from Home (album), a 2004 album by John Michael Montgomery
- Letter from Home, a 2011 album by Junior Mance
- "Letters from Home" (song), a song by John Michael Montgomery
- "Letters from Home", a song by Kenny G from Heart and Soul
- "Letters from Home", a song by Johnny Cash from Johnny Cash Is Coming to Town
- "Letters from Home", a song by Bradley Joseph from Solo Journey

== See also ==
- Letters Home (disambiguation)
- A Letter from Home (disambiguation)
