= High on a Windy Hill =

Single by Gene Krupa and his Orchestra

from the album Okeh – 5883
- A-side: "High on a Windy Hill"
- B-side: "It All Comes Back To Me Now"
- Released: 1940
- Genre: Jazz
- Label: Okeh Records
- Songwriter(s): Alex Kramer, Joan Whitney

Gene Krupa and his Orchestra singles chronology
"High on a Windy Hill"	")"

"High on a Windy Hill" is the first hit song written by the songwriting team of Alex Kramer and Joan Whitney.

It was first recorded in November 1940 by the American singer Lanny Ross (Victor – 27254), and was also contemporaneously recorded by Gene Krupa and his Orchestra (Okeh – 5883), Will Bradley and his Orchestra (Columbia – 35912), Jimmy Dorsey and His Orchestra (Decca – 3585), Jack Hastings and His Orchestra (Viking – 105), Swing and Sway with Sammy Kaye (Victor – 27232), and Vaughn Monroe and his Orchestra (Bluebird – B-10976). The recording by Gene Krupa reached the second spot on Billboard's list of best selling retail records, while the versions by Jimmy Dorsey and Will Bradley peaked at number seven and nine respectively. Jimmy Dorsey's recording also ranked number 43 on Billboard's 1941 top songs list.
