= Love Somebody (1947 song) =

Single by Doris Day and Buddy Clark
- B-side: "Confess"
- Recorded: 1947
- Length: 3:04
- Label: Columbia Records
- Songwriters: Joan Whitney and Alex Kramer

Doris Day singles chronology
"The Christmas Song"	"Love Somebody"	"Confess"

"Love Somebody" is a pop standard recorded by Doris Day. The song was written by Joan Whitney and Alex Kramer and published in 1947.

Doris Day and Buddy Clark recorded the song on November 21, 1947. It was released by Columbia Records as catalog number 38174, with the flip side "Confess". It first reached the Billboard magazine Best Seller chart on May 28, 1948, peaking at #6 and lasting 24 weeks on the chart.

On the Billboard US Top 100 Pop chart, the song reached number one and remained there for five consecutive weeks, becoming a Gold record. The B-side, "Confess", was also a chart hit for Day and Clark, peaking at #16.

"Love Somebody" was the #16 pop song of 1948.

== Cover versions ==
In 1963, Hong Kong female singer Chang Loo (張露) (1932–2009), covered this song, under title name of "Love Somebody / 我中意你", in alternate English and Cantonese language, on her album An Evening With Chang Loo with EMI Columbia Records.

In 2010, Australian singer Melinda Schneider recorded the song as a duet with David Campbell for her Doris Day tribute album Melinda Does Doris.
