= Scherzo à la Russe (ballet) =

Ballet choreographed by George Balanchine

- Choreographer: George Balanchine
- Music: Igor Stravinsky
- Premiere: June 21, 1972; New York State Theater
- Original ballet company: New York City Ballet
- Design: Karinska; Ronald Bates
- Created for: Karin von Aroldingen; Kay Mazzo
- Genre: neoclassical ballet

Scherzo à la Russe is a ballet choreographed by George Balanchine to Stravinsky's music of the same name. The ballet was created for New York City Ballet's Stravinsky Festival, a tribute to the composer after his death, and premiered on June 21, 1972, at the New York State Theater, with the two lead roles originated by Karin von Aroldingen and Kay Mazzo.

== Production ==
Stravinsky and Balanchine collaborated for many years until the former's death in 1971. The latter then decided to have the New York City Ballet hold the week-long Stravinsky Festival to honor the composer. There were at least 20 premieres, seven of which were choreographed by Balanchine.

One of the ballets made for the festival is set to Scherzo à la Russe, which Stravinsky wrote in 1925, for a film project that was abandoned. The four-minute long ballet is performed by an all-female cast, with two principal dancers and a corps de ballet of sixteen. Karin von Aroldingen and Kay Mazzo originated the two lead roles. The choreography resembles Russian folk dance. Von Aroldingen described, "You feel like a child or a doll when you do it. The whole thing is a smile. It's over so fast. That surprise short ending – it just stops dead – shows Stravinsky's humor."

The costumes were designed by Karinska, with the dancers in white Russian style dresses and crown-like headdress. The original lighting was designed by Ronald Bates. The choreography of the ballet was revised in 1982.

== Performances ==
Scherzo à la Russe premiered on June 21, 1972, at the New York State Theater. In addition to the New York City Ballet, the ballet had also been performed by students of the School of American Ballet.

== Critical reception ==
Following the premiere, New York Times critic Clive Barnes commented that the ballet "is a slight joke but warm one." He added, "Balanchine has taken this easy, almost succulent music, and made, slightly irreverently, the kind of Nursemaids’ Dance that he feels that Fokine should have contributed to Petrushka. It is brief, clever and lightly betwitching."
