= Letters Home =

Letters Home may refer to:

- Letters Home: Correspondence 1950–1963, a collection of letters written by Sylvia Plath to her family
- Letters Home (News from Babel album), 1986
- Letters Home (The Soldiers album), 2010
- Letters Home (Defeater album), 2013

== See also ==
- Letters from Home (disambiguation)
