= Far Away Places =

1948 song

"Far Away Places" is an American popular song. It was written by Joan Whitney and Alex Kramer and published in 1948.

The recording by Bing Crosby & The Ken Darby Choir was recorded on November 25, 1948 and released by Decca Records as catalog number 24532. It first reached the Billboard magazine Best Seller chart on December 31, 1948, and lasted 18 weeks on the chart, peaking at #2. The recording by Margaret Whiting was released by Capitol Records as catalog number 15278. It first reached the Billboard magazine Best Seller chart on December 17, 1948, and lasted 15 weeks on the chart, peaking at #3. The recording by Perry Como was released by RCA Victor as catalog number 20-3316. It first reached the Billboard magazine Best Seller chart on January 7, 1949, and lasted 16 weeks on the chart, peaking at #6. The recording by Dinah Shore was released by Columbia Records as catalog number 38356. It reached the Billboard magazine Best Seller chart on January 28, 1949, at #28 on its only week on the chart.

== Recorded versions ==
- Tom Anderson
- Ray Anthony orchestra
- The Bachelors (1963)
- Benny Carter
- Don Cherry
- Perry Como (1949)
- Ray Conniff
- Sam Cooke
- Bing Crosby & The Ken Darby Choir (recorded November 25, 1948)
- Eddie & the Showmen
- Ed Ames
- Shelby Flint
- John Gary
- Engelbert Humperdinck
- Enoch Light
- Vera Lynn
- Dean Martin
- Willie Nelson
- Donald Peers, song with orchestra. Conductor: Peter Yorke. Recorded in London on March 26, 1949. It was released by EMI on the His Master's Voice label as catalogue number B 9763.
- Gene Pitney
- Dinah Shore (1949)
- Frank Sinatra
- Johnny Hammond Smith
- Kate Smith
- The Springfields
- Lawrence Welk
- Margaret Whiting (1949)
- Joe Wilder
- Young-Holt Unlimited
- Willie Nelson with Sheryl Crow (To All the Girls...)
