= A Letter from Home =

A Letter from Home may refer to:

- A Letter from Home (film), a 1941 British short documentary film directed by Carol Reed
- "The Old Castle's Other Secret or A Letter from Home", a 2004 Scrooge McDuck comics story by Don Rosa

== See also ==
- Letter from Home (disambiguation)
