= Karel Šejna =

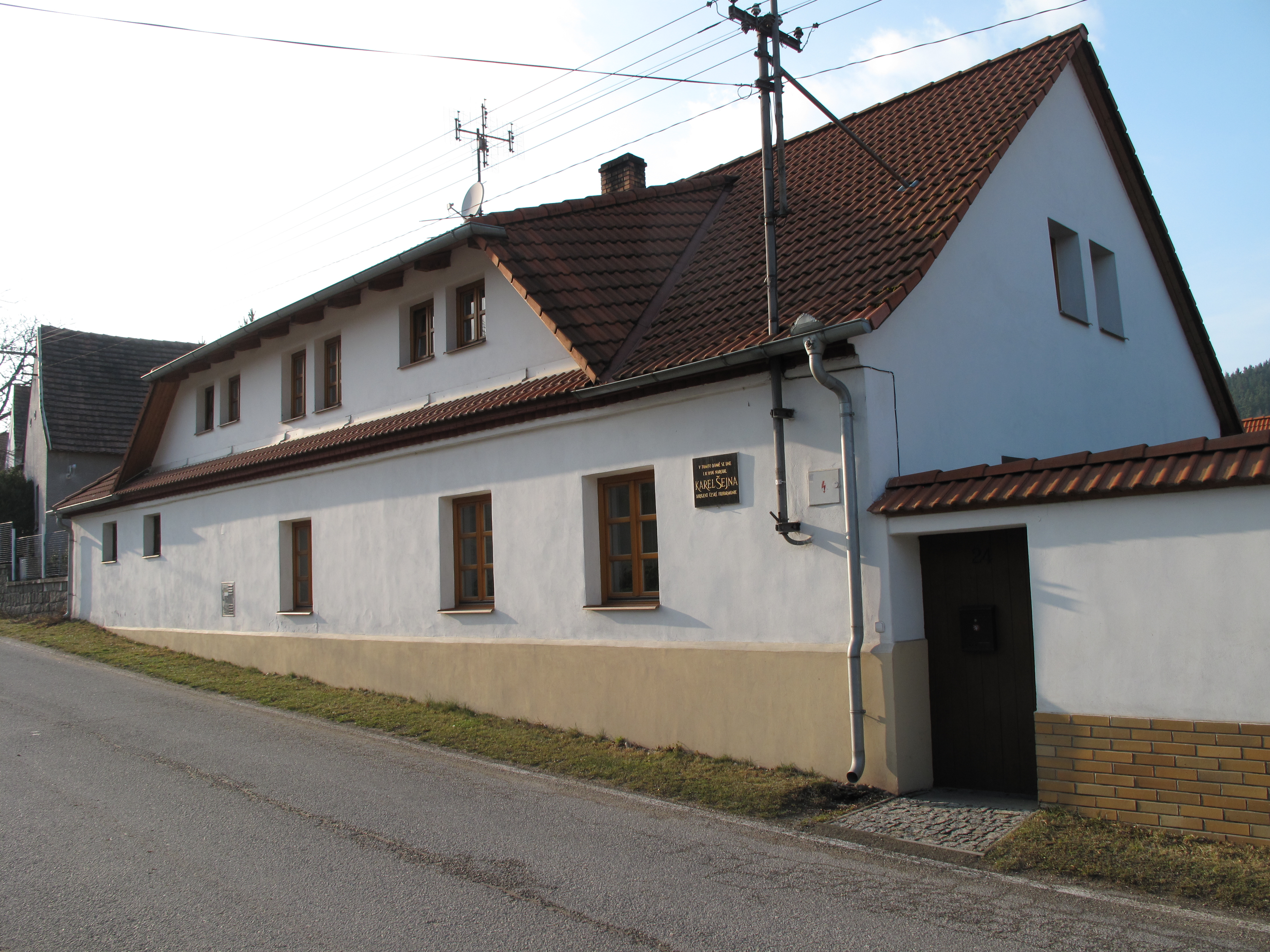
House in Zálezle. Prachatice District, Czech Republic.

Karel Šejna (1 November 1896, Zálezly – 17 December 1982, Prague) was a Czech double bassist and conductor, the principal conductor of the Czech Philharmonic Orchestra in 1950.

== Life and career ==
Šejna's musical studies were at the Prague Conservatory under Professor Černý (double-bass, 1914–20) and later with K. B. Jirák (composition). As a young man he gave several concerts in Egypt, and on his return to Czechoslovakia in 1921 he was appointed the first double-bassist of the Czech Philharmonic Orchestra, and shortly after (on 25 July 1922) also conducted the orchestra at a concert in Žofín Palace in Prague. Some compositions including a song-cycle and a string quartet date from this time.

He began to conduct on recommendation of the principal conductor of the Czech Philharmonic of that time, Václav Talich. Talich gradually entrusted him with more difficult tasks, and later recommended him to the post of conductor of the Czechoslovak Railway Workers Symphony Orchestra (1925–1936). From 1926 to 1938 Šejna worked also as choirmaster of the Hlahol Choir in Vinohrady, travelling with them to Yugoslavia and Vienna. In 1938 he was hired as the conductor of the Czech Philharmonic Orchestra. He conducted hundreds of concerts, notably romantic repertoire, but also the music of 20th century. (He performed the Prague premiere of Janáček's Glagolitic Mass). In 1937-38 Šejna was engaged as guest conductor of the Budapest Philharmonic Orchestra.

After the emigration of Rafael Kubelík, the post-war chief of the orchestra, Šejna was for a short time appointed as the principal conductor of the Czech Philharmonic, touring with the orchestra to East and West Germany and to the UK. He was a noted interpreter of the music of Hector Berlioz, César Franck, Richard Strauss and especially of Gustav Mahler. His last concert with the Czech Philharmonic took place on 11 February 1972, with Mahler's Symphony No. 4.

== Recordings ==
Šejna made more than 70 recordings, including Beethoven's Pastoral Symphony, Schubert's 8th symphony and Mahler's 4th symphony (soprano Maria Tauberová, recorded 1950) with Czech philharmonic. He was the first conductor to have recorded most of the works of Bedřich Smetana. He also recorded complete symphonies of Zdeněk Fibich and part of the work of Antonín Dvořák.

Conducting the Czech Philharmonic Orchestra, he made in 1949 the premiere recording of Martinů's Symphony No. 3 on Supraphon.

His 1959 recording of Dvořák's Slavonic Dances was awarded Cithare d´argent - Grand Prix de l´Association Française in Paris 1977.
