= Quartet Movement in B-flat major (Tchaikovsky) =

His 1st String Quartet

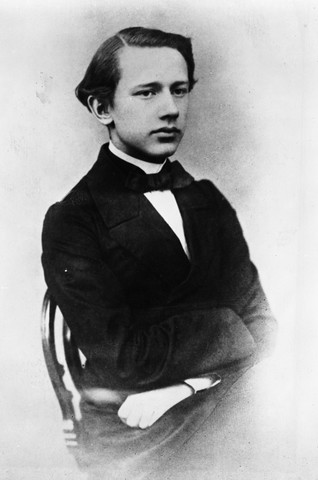
Tchaikovsky as a student at the St. Petersburg Conservatory in 1863

The Quartet Movement in B♭ major, TH 110, by Pyotr Ilyich Tchaikovsky is believed to be the only surviving movement of his first attempt to compose a string quartet in 1865. The composition consists of a single movement, marked Adagio misterioso – Allegro con moto, and typically lasts 12 or 13 minutes in performance. The movement was not published until 1940.

== Background ==
Tchaikovsky started work on the quartet in August 1865 at his brother-in-law's house in Kamenka, basing the first movement theme on a song he heard the gardeners singing. This theme was later recycled for the 1867 solo piano piece Scherzo à la russe Op.1, No. 1.

His brother Modest stated that he believed other movements had been composed, but destroyed by the composer.

The completed movement was premiered on 11 November 1865 at the Saint Petersburg Conservatory by a quartet composed of both faculty members and students (Konstantin Pushilov, Dmitry Panov, Vasily Bessel and Aleksandr Kuznetsov).

There has been much speculation as to why the work was apparently abandoned after the completion of the first movement, despite the comments by Modest Tchaikovsky mentioned earlier. One theory is that the composer either intended the work to be a single movement quartet or decided to complete it as such; another, similar to theories advanced about other unfinished works, is that the composer put the work aside and never went back to it.
