= Long Ago (and Far Away) =

1944 song

Song
- Published: 1944 by Crawford Music
- Songwriter: Ira Gershwin
- Composer: Jerome Kern

"Long Ago (and Far Away)" is a popular song with music by Jerome Kern, and lyrics about nostalgia by Ira Gershwin from the 1944 Technicolor film musical Cover Girl starring Rita Hayworth and Gene Kelly and released by Columbia Pictures. The song was nominated for the Academy Award for Best Original Song in 1944 but lost out to “Swinging on a Star”, from Going My Way. The song was published in 1944 and sold over 600,000 copies in sheet music in a year. In 2004 it finished #92 in AFI's 100 Years...100 Songs survey of top tunes in American cinema.

In the film it is sung by Rita Hayworth (dubbed by Martha Mears) to Gene Kelly, and later briefly reprised by Jinx Falkenburg. Charting versions were recorded almost simultaneously by Dick Haymes and Helen Forrest, Bing Crosby, Jo Stafford, and Perry Como.

The Dick Haymes-Helen Forrest recording was released by Decca Records as catalog number 23317. The record first reached the Billboard magazine charts on April 27, 1944 and lasted 11 weeks on the chart, peaking at #2.

The Jo Stafford recording was released by Capitol Records as catalog number 153. The record first reached the Billboard magazine charts on May 4, 1944 and lasted 12 weeks on the chart, peaking at #6.

The Perry Como recording was released by RCA Victor as catalog number 20-1569. The record first reached the Billboard magazine charts on May 11, 1944 and lasted three weeks on the chart, peaking at #8.

The Bing Crosby recording was released by Decca Records as catalog number 18608. The record first reached the Billboard magazine charts on June 29, 1944 and lasted four weeks on the chart, peaking at #5. The flip side, "Amor," also charted, making this a two-sided hit. The Crosby version of "Long Ago (and Far Away)" was used in the film Someone to Love (1987).

Johnny Desmond sang it in German with Glenn Miller and the American Band of the AEF during World War II. It was used as psychological warfare aimed at the German populace and especially the Wehrmacht.

The song was used in the film Till the Clouds Roll By (1946) when it was sung by Kathryn Grayson.

== Recorded versions ==
- John Abercrombie on 1996's Tactics
- Beegie Adair
- Ronnie Aldrich and his Orchestra
- Ambrose and his Orchestra
- Gene Ammons and Sonny Stitt on Boss Tenors in Orbit! (1962)
- Chet Baker (1955) Chet Baker Sings and Plays
- Tony Bennett and Bill Charlap
- Acker Bilk
- Paul Bley
- Pat Boone (1964)
- Connee Boswell
- Les Brown and his Orchestra (vocal: Doris Day) (1945)
- Dave Brubeck
- Benny Carter
- Frank Chacksfield and his Orchestra
- Richard Clayderman
- Rosemary Clooney (1979)
- Perry Como (1944)
- Bing Crosby (recorded May 3, 1944 and included in the album Bing Crosby – Jerome Kern.)
- Bob Crosby and his Orchestra
- Meredith d'Ambrosio (1996)
- Bobby Darin (1961)
- Tommy Dorsey
- Billy Eckstine
- Percy Faith and his Orchestra
- Michael Feinstein
- Eddie Fisher
- Helen Forrest and Dick Haymes (1944)
- The Four Freshmen
- The Four Lads (1956)
- Judy Garland (1945)
- Erroll Garner
- Lesley Garrett (1996)
- Ron Goodwin
- Eydie Gormé
- Robert Goulet (1965)
- Stephane Grappelli
- Johnny Hartman
- Dick Haymes
- The Hi-Lo's (1955)
- Michael Holliday
- Engelbert Humperdinck (1988)
- Leslie Hutchinson
- Joni James
- Salena Jones
- Shirley Jones and Jack Cassidy (1959)
- Bev Kelly (1960)
- Julie Kelly
- Stan Kenton and his Orchestra
- Peggy King (1984)
- Dorothy Kirsten
- Lee Konitz
- Kay Kyser and his Orchestra
- Jeanie Lambe (1998)
- Vicky Lane (1959)
- Mario Lanza (1951)
- Steve Lawrence (1964)
- Guy Lombardo and His Royal Canadians (vocal: Tony Craig) (1944)
- London Philharmonic Orchestra
- Vera Lynn
- Gloria Lynne (1960)
- Henry Mancini and his Orchestra
- Mantovani and his Orchestra
- Andrea Marcovicci
- Sally Martin
- Johnny Mathis (1965)
- Bob McCarroll (2010) That Old Feeling
- Sylvia McNair and André Previn (1994)
- Marian McPartland (1985)
- Martha Mears and Gene Kelly (Film Soundtrack, 1944)
- Bette Midler
- The Migil 5 (1964)
- Glenn Miller and The AAF Band (vocal: Johnny Desmond) (1944)
- Marion Montgomery
- Joan Morris and William Bolcom
- Marni Nixon (1988)
- Emile Pandolfi
- Jackie Paris (1960)
- Art Pepper
- Anthony Perkins (On A Rainy Afternoon)
- Oscar Peterson
- Jimmy Raney
- Johnnie Ray
- Cliff Richard (Love is Forever album, 1965)
- Amália Rodrigues
- Jo Stafford (1944)
- George Shearing
- Frank Sinatra (1944)
- Rod Stewart (2005)
- Richard Tauber (1944)
- Kiri Te Kanawa (1993)
- The Three Suns (Instrumental, 1944)
- Mel Tormé
- Elisabeth Welch (1989)
- Paul Weston and his Orchestra
- Margaret Whiting (1960)
- Phil Woods
