= Bob Eberle =

American politician (1934–2024)

Member of the Washington House of Representatives for the 30th district
- In office 1979–1983

Member of the Washington House of Representatives for the 34th district
- In office 1963–1964

Personal details
- Born: November 19, 1934 Missouri, United States
- Died: January 10, 2024 (aged 89)
- Party: Republican
- Occupation: Teacher, engineer

Robert D. Eberle (November 19, 1934 – January 10, 2024) was an American politician in the state of Washington. He served the 30th district and 35th districts in the House of Representatives.
