= Symphony No. 6 (Villa-Lobos) =

- Sobre a linha das montanhas do Brasil
- by Heitor Villa-Lobos
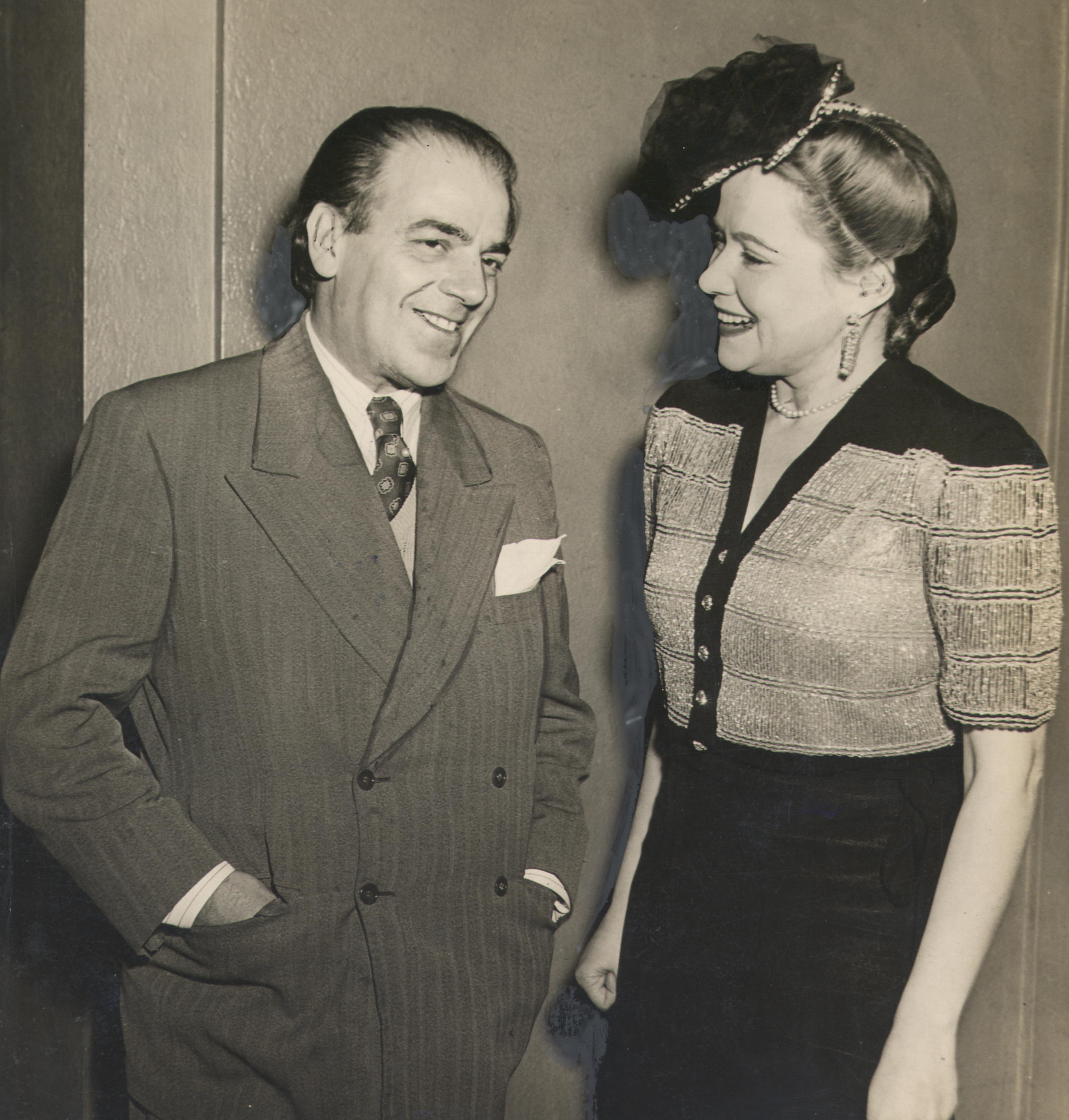
- Heitor Villa Lobos and Bidu Sayão in 1945
- English: On the Outline of the Mountains of Brazil
- Catalogue: W447
- Based on: "Millimetrization" of the outline of mountains at Belo Horizonte in Brazil
- Composed: 1944
- Dedication: Mindinha
- Published: 1955: New York
- Publisher: Belwin-Mills
- Duration: 25 mins
- Movements: Four

Premiere
- Date: 29 April 1950
- Location: Theatro Municipal, Rio de Janeiro
- Conductor: Heitor Villa-Lobos
- Performers: Orquestra Sinfônica do Theatro Municipal

Symphony No. 6, subtitled Sobre a linha das montanhas do Brasil (On the Outline of the Mountains of Brazil), is a composition by the Brazilian composer Heitor Villa-Lobos, written in 1944. The score is dedicated to Mindinha.

A typical performance lasts about 25 minutes.

== History ==
Villa-Lobos composed his Sixth Symphony in Rio de Janeiro in 1944. It was first performed in Rio de Janeiro on 29 April 1950 by the Orquestra do Theatro Municipal, conducted by the composer.

An early report, based on conversations with Villa-Lobos in Paris in 1928–29, said that a Sixth Symphony (subtitled Symphonie indienne and based on Brazilian indigenous themes) had been written shortly after the Fifth Symphony, at about the same time as Villa-Lobos's opera Malazarte (1921), but had never been performed. No reference to such a work is found in the official catalogue of the composer's works, however.

== Instrumentation ==
The symphony is scored for an orchestra consisting of 2 piccolos, 3 flutes, 2 oboes, cor anglais, 2 clarinets, bass clarinet, 2 bassoons, contrabassoon, 4 horns, 4 trumpets, 4 trombones, tuba, percussion (timpani, tam-tam, bass drum, large side drum, Indian drum, side drum, cymbals, and vibraphone), celesta, 2 harps, and strings.

== Analysis ==
The symphony consists of four movements:

1. Allegro non troppo
2. Lento
3. Allegretto quasi animato
4. Allegro

The main theme of the symphony was devised by projecting the outline of mountains at Belo Horizonte, Brazil, onto graph paper and transcribing the result as a melody. Villa-Lobos called this technique milimetrazação (graphing), sometimes rendered in English as "millimetrization". or "milmeterization". A harmonized version of this melody for piano, together with a similar treatment titled New York Skyline, was initially published in the October 1942 issue of New Music, devoted to works by Brazilian composers.

The first movement is in a slightly unconventional sonata-allegro form which, according to the composer's usual methods, omits the second theme from the recapitulation. The overall tonal centre is on C, with secondary key areas on D and G.

In the second movement, Villa-Lobos utilizes a technique of drawing attention to a pitch through its exclusion, in an arguably atonal passage in b. 33–47 where a clarinet solo weaves a long melody repeatedly using eleven chromatic notes, with the omission of the note G. This pitch is then introduced emphatically in the viola entrance at b. 47.
