= Symphony No. 3 (Martinů) =

- by Bohuslav Martinů
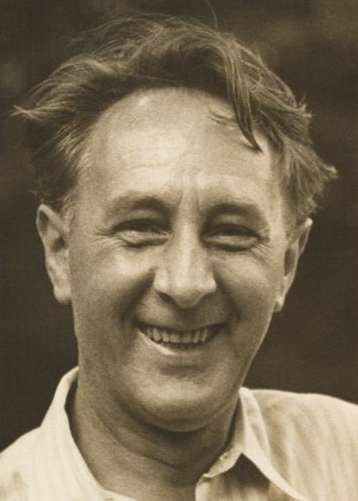
- Martinů c. 1942
- Catalogue: H. 299
- Composed: 1944
- Dedication: Serge Koussevitzky and the Boston Symphony Orchestra

Premiere
- Date: 12 October 1945
- Conductor: Serge Koussevitzky
- Performers: Boston Symphony Orchestra

The Symphony No. 3, H. 299, is an orchestral composition by the Czech composer Bohuslav Martinů.

== History ==
Martinů composed his Third Symphony during a summer retreat in Ridgefield, Connecticut, from 2 May to 14 June 1944. The composition was not the result of a commission, but rather was a spontaneous gesture, and is dedicated to Serge Koussevitzky and the Boston Symphony Orchestra, on the twentieth anniversary of their association. It was premiered in Boston, Massachusetts, on 12 October 1945 by the dedicatees.

The second movement is dated 26 May 1944, and so it is very probable that he was working on the finale when news was received of the Allied landing in Normandy on 6 June. Although this has sometimes been interpreted as an influence on the joyful turn taken in this movement, it is also possible that the overall design of the symphony had been established much earlier.

The second movement contains thematic and harmonic material identical to the slow movement of the Piano Quintet No. 2, which had been written immediately before the symphony.

== Music ==
The symphony is scored for two flutes, piccolo, two oboes, cor anglais, three clarinets, two bassoons, four horns, three trumpets, three trombones, tuba, timpani, percussion (three players: cymbals, tam-tam, triangle, bass drum, side drum), harp, piano, and strings.

The symphony is in three movements:

1. Allegro poco moderato
2. Largo
3. Allegro – Andante

The symphony begins in the dark key of E♭ minor and progresses to the bright sound of E major at the close of the finale.

== Discography ==
- Martinů: Symphony No. 3. Czech Philharmonic, conducted by Karel Šejna. Recorded in Prague, 21 October 1949. 78 rpm recording, 4 discs, mono. Supraphon 2057/60. [First recording of the work.] Re-issued 1995 on Supraphon SU1924-2.
- Martinů: Symphony No. 3. Brno State Philharmonic Orchestra conducted by Břetislav Bakala. Recorded in Warsaw, 1956. LP recording, 10 in., mono. Muza L0150. [Warsaw]: Polski Nagrania. [First LP recording of the work.].
- Martinů: Symphony No. 3; Symphony No. 4; Symphony No. 5. Czech Philharmonic, Václav Neumann, cond. 2-LP set, quadraphonic. Supraphon 1410 2771/2. Prague: Supraphon, 1979. Reissued as part of Martinů Symphonies. 3-CD set, stereo. Supraphon 110382. [Prague]: Supraphon, 1994.
- Martinů Symphonies No. 3, No. 6 "Fantaisies symphoniques". Czech Philharmonic, Václav Neumann, cond. Recorded 26–28 August 1982 (Symphony No. 3), and 14–20 June 1984 (Symphony No. 6), House of Artists, Prague. CD recording, stereo. Supraphon 33C37-7760. Tokyo: Nippon Columbia Co., Ltd., 1986.
- Martinů: Complete Symphonies. Bamberg Symphony Orchestra, Neeme Järvi, cond. 3-CD set. Recorded 1987 and 1988 at the Dominikanerbau, Bamberg. Bis 1371/2. [Sweden]: Bis, 2003. Reissued, 3-CD set. Brilliant Classics 8950. [N.p.]: Brilliant Classics, 2008.
- Martinů: Symphony No. 3; Symphony No. 4. Scottish National Orchestra, Bryden Thomson, cond. Recorded 6–7, September 1989, in the Henry Wood Hall, Glasgow. CD recording, digital, stereo, 4¾ in. Chandos CHAN 8917; Cassette tape, Chandos ABTD 1525. Colchester, Essex, England: Chandos, 1991.
- Martinů: Symphony No. 3; Symphony No. 4. Czech Philharmonic, Jiří Bělohlávek, cond. Recorded at Dvořák Hall of the Rudolfinum, Prague, 8–11 September 2003. CD recording, stereo. Supraphon SU 3631-2 031; Qualiton 099925363123; 675754697129. Prague: Supraphon, 2003.
- Martinů: Symphonies nos 1–6. Prague Radio Symphony Orchestra, Vladimír Válek, cond. Recorded Prague, Czech Radio, Studio A, 2006. 3-CD set. Supraphon SU 3940. Prague: Supraphon, 2008.
- Martinů: The 6 Symphonies. BBC Symphony Orchestra, Jiří Bělohlávek. Recorded live at the Barbican Hall, London, 3 October 3 (No. 1) and 9 October (No. 2), 2009; 19 February (No. 4), 19 March (No. 5), 17 April 17 (No. 3), and 8 May (No. 6), 2010. 3-CD set. Onyx 4061. [London]: Onyx Classics, 2011.
