= Symphony No. 1 (Carter) =

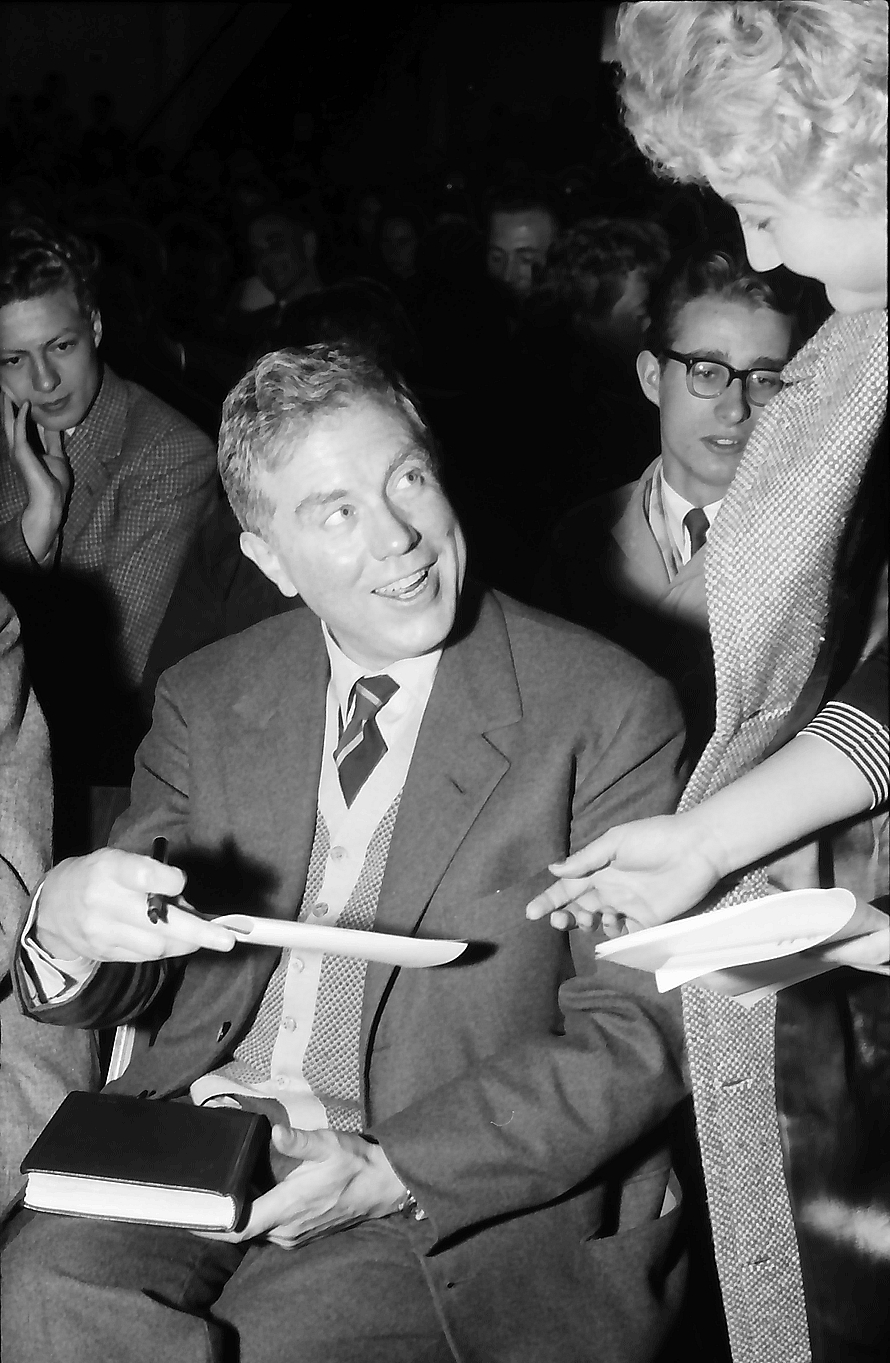
Elliott Carter at the Donaueschingen Festival in 1957

The Symphony No. 1 is a symphony for orchestra by the American composer Elliott Carter. The work was originally completed in Santa Fe, New Mexico on December 18, 1942, though Carter later revised the work in 1954. It was first performed on April 27, 1944, by the Eastman-Rochester Symphony under the direction of Howard Hanson at the fourteenth annual Festival of American Music. The piece is dedicated to Carter's wife.

== Composition ==
The Symphony has a duration of roughly 25 minutes and is composed in three movements:

1. Moderately, wistfully
2. Slowly, gravely
3. Vivaciously

=== Instrumentation ===
The work is scored for an orchestra comprising two flutes (second doubling piccolo), two oboes, two clarinets (first doubling E♭ clarinet), two bassoons, two horns, two trumpets, trombone, timpani, and strings.

== Reception ==
The Symphony No. 1 has been praised by music critics. Reviewing a 2003 recording of the work (among other Carter pieces), Arnold Whittall of Gramophone wrote:

The wartime muscularity of the Symphony No 1 (completed in 1942 but heard here in its 1954 revision) is clearest in passages which echo, or anticipate, Copland's more extrovert orchestral scores of the same period. But that triumphalist spirit is most productively on show in Carter's splendidly brash Holiday Overture (1944). The Symphony as a whole is less straightforward, more varied in style and character, and the slow movement in particular moves from hymnic meditation into more ambiguous regions of expression in a manner that might not be completely convincing. It is certainly distinctive, however, and fits well with the balance between restraint and exuberance that typifies the work as a whole.
