= Luise Greger =

German composer and pianist

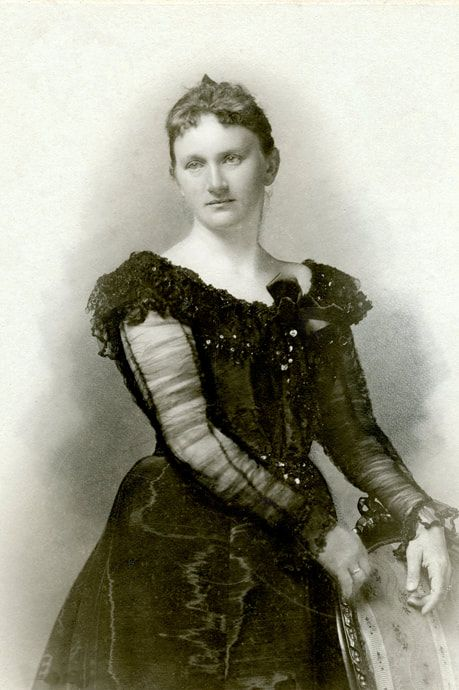
- Born: December 27, 1862; Greifswald, Germany
- Died: January 25, 1944 (aged 81); Merxhausen, Hesse, Germany
- Occupations: Composer; pianist
- Years active: 1865–1944

Luise Sumpf Greger (27 December 1862 – 25 January 1944) was a German composer and pianist.

== Life ==
Greger took lessons at five and at nine she played for the Tsar. She began composing at 11. While still in Berlin in the 1890s, Richard Strauss proclaimed her to be a composer. She continued composing into her seventies and in 1933-34 her musical Christmas fairytale "Goose Girl" was performed 13 times to much acclaim.

At an old age she was a resident of a nursing home. On December 2, 1943, she was taken to the Merxhausen State Institution because of “gradually increasing senile mental disorder”. There she died on January 25, 1944, from hunger as a victim of National Socialist euthanasia.

Decades later her family found some of her songs in a trunk and she has since been honored in many forums in Germany and the US.

Some of her descendants are American and it was through her music that they connected with their German family. The "Luise Greger International Women in Music Festival" started in Langley, on Whidbey Island, WA, celebrating her works and those of other talented local and international female composers from Washington state. The “father of Langley” Jacob Anthes was from Hesse, the state where Grefer lived and performed in the “Garden City” of Kassel, now a UNESCO heritage site.

== Compositions ==
In her lifetime, Luise Greger received great recognition as a chamber singer and songwriter in her home country of Germany and throughout Europe, but her work and life are barely recognised today.
