= 7-0-5 =

"7-0-5" appears on the 1996 RCA Victor collection Glenn Miller: The Secret Broadcasts.

"7-0-5" or "Seven-O-Five" or "705" is a big-band instrumental composed by Glenn Miller in 1943. It was performed by the Army Air Force Orchestra under his leadership in 1943-1944, and in 1945 under Jerry Gray.

Miller's written scores were assigned catalog numbers in a system that he and his arrangers had devised, and "7-0-5" is this score's number. Though it was once published as "Rock and Ride", and other titles were also used for it including "Goofin' Off" and "Jivin' the Blues", none of those titles was kept; its score number was used instead.

== Broadcasts and recordings ==
"7-0-5" was featured on the December 4, 1943 Uncle Sam Presents radio program as a "ride-out", and again on February 5, 1944. That program regularly featured an additional instrumental after the final main theme; they were recorded at the same session with the rest of the program. The Uncle Sam Presents programs were recorded at NBC for the Office of War Information (OWI) and were broadcast for allied service personnel on OWI's "Voice of America" shortwave service, as well as local OWI and Army radio globally.

"7-0-5" was performed, recorded, and broadcast on the I Sustain the Wings radio program, Program No. 15, on May 5, 1944, and again on November 10, 1945. The May 5, 1944 recording was later included on the 1996 album Glenn Miller: The Secret Broadcasts on RCA Victor, and on the 1995 compilation album Glenn Miller: The Missing Years. Volume One: American Patrol on the UK Avid Entertainment label. The November 10, 1945 recording appeared on the 1992 UK album Major Glenn Miller's Army Air Forces Overseas Orchestra: American Patrol, Vol. II on Magic Records (DAWE55), and on the 2012 CD and MP3 compilation album The Glenn Miller Band Honors US Troops by the WNTS Corporation. A V-Disc test pressing, matrix code VP 375 D7TC-7335, was also made from the 1945 recording.

Larry O'Brien and the Glenn Miller Orchestra recorded "7-0-5" on the 2006 album Steppin' Out. Wersiking recorded it in 2009 on a Wersi Helios and Yamaha Tyros. The Glenn Miller Orchestra Scandinavia performed it as part of the "Christmas Show with the Glenn Miller Orchestra" at Stockholm's Konserthus in Sweden in 2013. The Cornerstone Jazz Trio recorded it in 2003 and released it on the album One for the Road featuring Larry O'Brien and Nick Hilscher. The Glenn Miller Orchestra under Nick Hilscher performed "7-0-5" at the 44th Annual Glenn Miller Festival in Clarinda, Iowa held from June 6-9, 2019. Jean Viardot recorded it in Paris in 2022.

== Sources ==
- Simon, George Thomas. Glenn Miller and His Orchestra. NY: Crowell, 1974.
- Simon, George Thomas (1971). Simon Says. New York: Galahad. ISBN 0-88365-001-0.
- Flower, John. Moonlight Serenade: A Bio-discography of the Glenn Miller Civilian Band. New Rochelle, NY: Arlington House, 1972.
