= Joan Whitney Kramer =

American singer-songwriter

Joan Whitney Kramer (June 26, 1914 – July 12, 1990), also known as Zoe Parenteau and Joan Whitney, was an American singer and songwriter.

== Early years ==
Born as Zoe Parenteau in Pittsburgh, Pennsylvania on June 26, 1914, Parenteau received her early music training while singing in the choir of the church she attended.

She subsequently attended Finch College in New York City.

== Career, name change and marriage ==
Professionally, Parenteau pursued voice studies with Alex Kramer, with whom she later collaborated on multiple songs, including "Candy", "Ain't Nobody Here but Us Chickens" and "Far Away Places."

In 1934, while playing a showgirl in The Great Waltz on Broadway, Parenteau took the stage name Joan Whitney. She appeared in that production for two years. She also became known for her singing appearances with the bands of Will Osbourne and Leo Reisman.

In August 1944, she appeared in concert in Philadelphia, Pennsylvania, as part of the world premiere of "A Salute to the Composers of America's Popular Songs." The orchestra was conducted by Sigmund Romberg and the master of ceremonies was Oscar Hammerstein II. The list of participating performers included Romberg, Kramer and Richard Rodgers, as well as Harry Armstrong, Abel Baer, Peter DeRose, Milton Drake, Dorothy Fields, Ray Henderson, Al Hoffman, Herman Hupfeld, Jerry Livingston, Luckey Roberts, Nat Simon, Harry Tierney, and Charles Tobias.

Whitney subsequently married her mentor and collaborator, Alex Kramer. She and Kramer had one son, Doren, while living in Forest Hills, New York.

=== Honors ===
Joan Whitney Kramer and her husband, Alex, were nominated to the Songwriters Hall of Fame in 1982.

== Death ==
Kramer died on July 12, 1990, in Westport, Connecticut at the age of seventy-six from Alzheimer's disease.

== Songs written ==
=== with Alex Kramer ===
- "Ain't Nobody Here but Us Chickens" (1946)
- "Behave Yourself"
- "Comme Ci Comme Ca" -English lyrics by- Joan Whitney and Alex Kramer -music by- Bruno Coquatrix (1949)
- "Deep as the River" (recorded by Harry Belafonte in 1949)
- "Far Away Places" (1948)
- "High on a Windy Hill" (1940)
- "I Only Saw Him (You) Once" (1947)
- "Love Somebody" (1947)
- "Money Is the Root of All Evil (Take It Away Take It Away Take It Away)" (1945)
- "No Man Is an Island"
- "That's The Way It Is" (1945)
- "Why Is It?" (1940)

=== with Mack David and Alex Kramer ===
- "Candy" (1944)
- "Come With Me My Honey (The Song Of Calypso Joe)" (fox-trot rhumba), song featured by Bob Crosby and His Band in the film Meet Miss Bobby Socks (1944)
- "It's Love, Love, Love" (1943)

=== with Hy Zaret and Alex Kramer ===
- "I'm Not Afraid" (1952)
- "It All Comes Back To Me Now" (1940)
- "Got A Letter From My Kid Today" (1940)
- "My Sister and I" (1941)
- "So You're The One" (1940)
- "The Doll With A Sawdust Heart" (1951)
- "To Be Loved By You" (1952)
- "You'll Never Get Away" (1952)
- "Christmas Roses" (1952)
