= Alex Kramer =

Canadian songwriter

Alex Kramer (May 30, 1903 – February 10, 1998) was a Canadian songwriter.

He was born in Montreal, Quebec, Canada. His parents were Adolph and Freda Kramer. At age 17 he was hired as a pianist in a silent movie theater in Montreal. He traveled first to Palm Beach, Florida, joining the Meyer Davis Orchestra, and then to Paris and Cannes, before returning to New York City, where he became a radio bandleader. He also worked as an accompanist in nightclubs and in vaudeville.

One of his other musical activities was coaching vocalists in singing techniques, and one of his students was Joan Whitney, who eventually became both his wife and his songwriting partner. Their first hit as a songwriting team was "High on a Windy Hill," which became a No. 1 hit in 1941 for the Jimmy Dorsey orchestra.

In 1948, he and his wife started a song publishing firm. However, soon followed the end of the big band era, leading to the collapse of their publishing business. He eventually became associated with Bourne Co. Music Publishers. He also continued to lead an orchestra, conduct on the radio, and serve as an accompanist in night clubs and what remained of the vaudeville business.

== Death ==
In 1973 he moved to Westport, Connecticut, where he died at age 94.

== Songs written ==
=== with Joan Whitney ===
- "Ain't Nobody Here But Us Chickens" (1946)
- "Behave Yourself"
- "Deep as the River" (recorded by Harry Belafonte in 1949)
- "Far Away Places" (1948)
- "High on a Windy Hill" (1940)
- "Love Somebody" (1947)
- "Money Is the Root of All Evil" (1945)
- "No Man Is an Island"

=== with Mack David and Joan Whitney ===
- "Candy" (1944)
- "It's Love, Love, Love" (1943)

=== with Hy Zaret and Joan Whitney ===
- "My Sister and I" (1941)
- "The Doll With The Sawdust Heart" (1951)
