= Scherzo à la russe (Tchaikovsky) =

Scherzo by Tchaikovsky

Scherzo à la russe, Op. 1, No. 1, is part of the first published work of Pyotr Ilyich Tchaikovsky in 1867, Two Pieces for Piano, Op. 1. It is based on a Ukrainian folk tune in B♭ major, that the composer noted at Kamianka in 1865 and had earlier used in his first attempt to write a string quartet. It was first called Capriccio (Italian, "whim") but was later changed to "Scherzo à la russe". The other piece in the work is the Impromptu in E♭ minor, Op. 1, No. 2.
