= It's Love-Love-Love =

Song

"It's Love, Love, Love" is a popular song with music written by Joan Whitney and Alex Kramer, and with lyrics by Mack David, and published in 1943.

== Guy Lombardo recording ==
The best-known recording was by Guy Lombardo and his Royal Canadians (vocal by Skip Nelson). It was recorded on January 7, 1944, and released by Decca Records as catalog number 18589. It first reached the Billboard Best Seller chart on April 6, 1944 and lasted 10 weeks on the chart, peaking at No. 1.

== Other versions ==
Later in 1944, a recording was released by the King Sisters on Bluebird Records, a subsidiary of RCA Victor, and this too charted with a peak position of No. 4.

The Platters included the song on their album Song for the Lonely (1962).

== Popular culture ==
The song was included in the film Stars on Parade (1944).
