= String Quartet No. 8 (Villa-Lobos) =

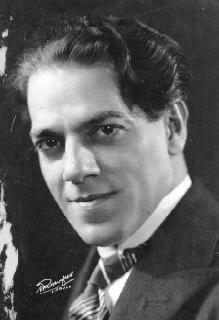
Heitor Villa-Lobos

String Quartet No. 8 is one of 17 works in the genre by the Brazilian composer Heitor Villa-Lobos. Villa-Lobos composed his Eighth Quartet in Rio de Janeiro in 1944. The name of the quartet that gave the premiere in the Auditório do MEC on 5 September 1946, Rio de Janeiro, is not certain. However, the score is dedicated to the Quarteto Iacovino.

A typical performance lasts approximately 25 minutes.

== Analysis ==
The quartet consists of four movements:

1. Allegro
2. Lento
3. Scherzo (Vivace)
4. Quasi allegro

According to the composer, the Eighth Quartet is systematically atonal throughout.

The first movement lacks the expected development section, while the slow, second movement displays the qualities of the Brazilian improvisational instrumental serenade called a choro. The finale is marked by a rhythmic pattern that is especially difficult from the performers' point of view.

== Discography ==
Chronological, by date of recording.

- Heitor Villa-Lobos: String Quartets Nos. 1, 8 and 13. Danubius Quartet (Judit Tóth and Adél Miklós, violins; Cecilia Bodolai, viola; Ilona Wibli, cello). Recorded at the Hungaroton Studios in Budapest, 10–19 October 1990. CD recording, 1 disc: digital, 12 cm, stereo. Marco Polo 8.223389. A co-production with Records International. Germany: HH International, Ltd., 1992.
- Villa-Lobos: String Quartets, Volume 2. Quartets Nos. 3, 8, 14. Cuarteto Latinoamericano (Saúl Bitrán, Arón Bitrán, violins; Javier Montiel, viola; Alvaro Bitrán, cello). Recorded at the Troy Savings Bank Music Hall in Troy, NY, March 1995. Music of Latin American Masters. CD recording, 1 disc: digital, 12 cm, stereo. Dorian DOR-90220. Troy, NY: Dorian Recordings, 1996.
  - Reissued as part of Heitor Villa-Lobos: The Complete String Quartets. 6 CDs + 1 DVD with a performance of Quartet No. 1 and interview with the Cuarteto Latinoamericano. Dorian Sono Luminus. DSL-90904. Winchester, VA: Sono Luminus, 2009.
  - Also reissued (without the DVD) on Brilliant Classics 6634.
- Heitor Villa-Lobos: Quartetos de cordas 7, 8, 9, 10, 11. Quarteto Amazônia. CD recording, 2 discs: digital, 12 cm, stereo. Barcelona: Discmedi D.L., 2000.
  - Also issued as part of Villa-Lobos: Os 17 quartetos de cordas / The 17 String Quartets. Quarteto Bessler-Reis and Quarteto Amazônia. CD recording, 6 sound discs: digital, 12 cm, stereo. Kuarup Discos KCX-1001 (KCD 045, M-KCD-034, KCD 080/1, KCD-051, KCD 042). Rio de Janeiro: Kuarup Discos, 1996.

== Filmography ==
- Villa-Lobos: A integral dos quartetos de cordas. Quarteto Radamés Gnattali (Carla Rincón, Francisco Roa, violins; Fernando Thebaldi, viola; Hugo Pilger, cello); presented by Turibio Santos. Recorded from June 2010 to September 2011 at the Palácio do Catete, Palácio das Laranjeiras, and the Theatro Municipal, Rio de Janeiro. DVD and Blu-ray (VIBD11111), 3 discs. Rio de Janeiro: Visom Digital, 2012.
