= Sonata for Two Pianos (Stravinsky) =

1944 composition by Igor Stravinsky

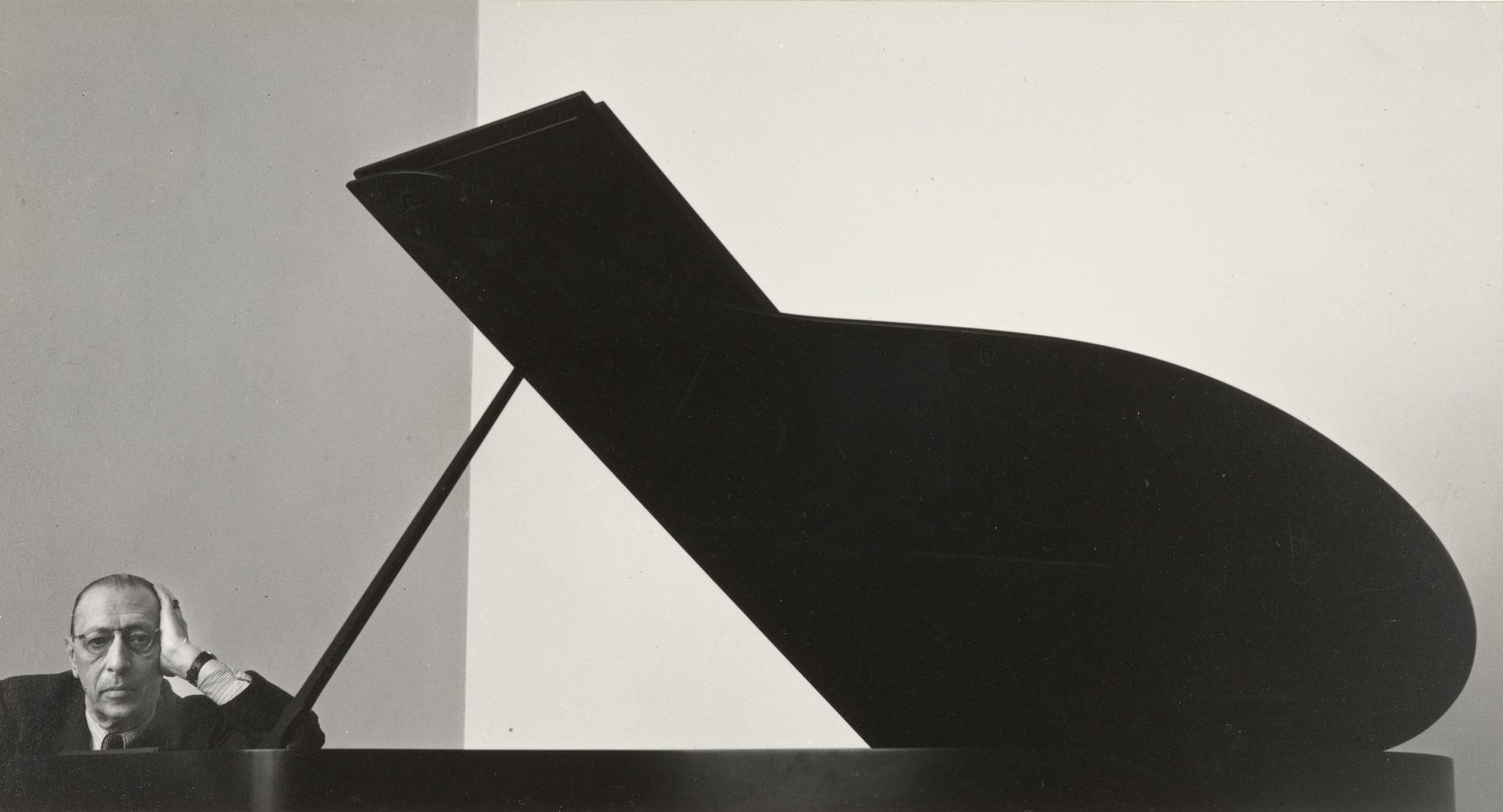
Photograph of Stravinsky by Arnold Newman

Sonata for Two Pianos is a composition by Russian composer Igor Stravinsky, premiered in 1944 by Richard Johnston and Nadia Boulanger. First conceived as a solo work, Stravinsky needed to write it for four hands to voice all four melodic lines clearly. It is considered one of Stravinsky's most important compositions for two solo pianos, together with Concerto for Two Pianos.

== Structure ==
The sonata is in three movements, though one CD recording indexes the theme and four variations of the second movement separately. However, it is in only three movements.

1. Moderato
2. Theme with Variations
  - Theme
  - Variation I
  - Variation II
  - Variation III
  - Variation IV. Conclusion
3. Allegretto
