= Scherzo à la russe (Stravinsky) =

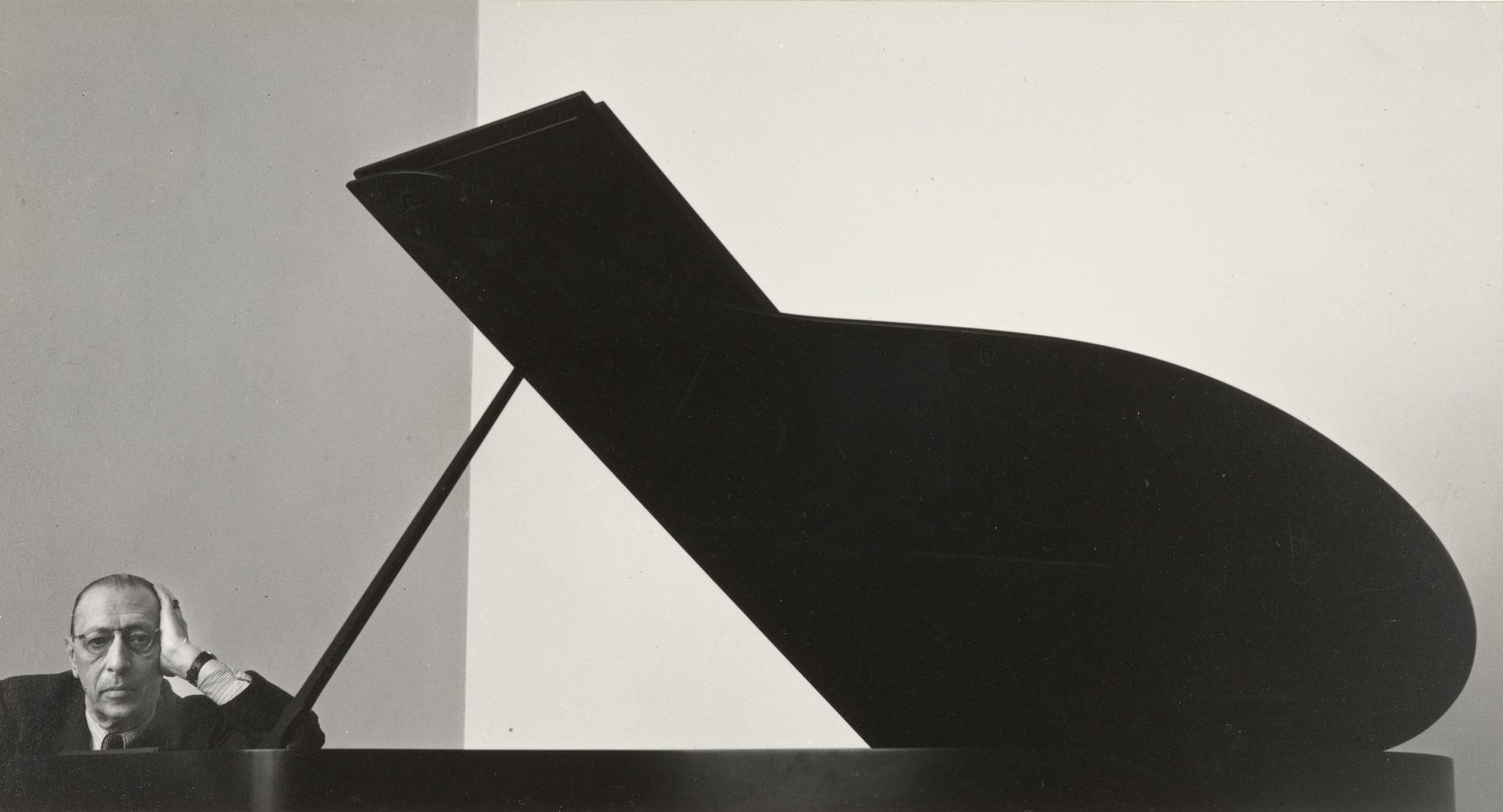
Photograph of Igor Stravinsky by Arnold Newman

Scherzo à la russe is a composition by Russian expatriate composer Igor Stravinsky. It was initially published by Chappell & Co. in 1945 and premiered in March 1946 by the San Francisco Symphony Orchestra, conducted by the composer himself. It was later published by Boosey & Hawkes.

== Composition ==
Stravinsky had been going through economical problems since he moved to America, partially because he lost the royalties from his works in Europe and had to compose more works to exploit them in America. The Scherzo à la russe was first conceived as a work for film use, as it was intended to be featured in The North Star. When the film project was aborted, Stravinsky decided to re-orchestrate it for Paul Whiteman Band. The only two conditions were: the piece had to be easy-listening and it had to fit on a 78 rpm disc. This version for jazz orchestra was premiered in 1944 by Blue Network but, according to Stravinsky scholar Eric Walter White, it didn't seem to be a success. Stravinsky decided to arrange it again in 1945 for symphony orchestra for it to be published and premiered in 1946 at San Francisco.

== Analysis ==
The work takes approximately 4 minutes to perform. It is commonly analysed as follows:

- Main theme: Presented in G major in 2/4. The tune groups itself into four-bar phrases. One of the most remarkable aspects is the use of accents all along this first section: notes go in couples with no accent on the first note and an accent on the second, which is tied to the first. This effect recalls the wheezing sound patterns of accordions.
  - Trio I: Presented in B major. Features a canon between the piano and the harp, while three muted violins play rapid semiquavers. The melodic material, both here and in Trio II, derive from Russian themes extracted from Stravinsky's Sonata for Two Pianos.
- Main theme: First section repeated.
  - Trio II: This section is in ternary form. It can be divided as:
    - (A): Presented in C major. Saxophones become more relevant in this section, while the flute and a solo violin play rapid ascending scales.
    - (B): Presented in E♭ major. Fortissimo drum beats accompany the previous tune, which is now transposed and modified.
    - (A′): Same structure as (A)
- Main theme: First section repeated, which concludes the piece.

== Instrumentation ==
=== Original jazz version ===
The symphony jazz orchestra proposed by Paul Whiteman was very atypical for jazz music: 6 saxophones, strings, winds, brass and percussion.

=== Symphony orchestra version ===
The piece is scored for a symphony orchestra with the following instrumentation.

Woodwinds

Piccolo
2 flutes
2 oboes
2 clarinets
2 bassoons

Brass

4 horns
3 trumpets
3 trombones
Tuba

Percussion

Timpani

Bass drum
Snare drums
Xylophone
Tambourine
Triangle
Suspended cymbal

Keyboards

Piano

Strings

Harp

Violin I
Violin II
Viola
Cello
Double bass

=== Other arrangements ===
Apart from the symphony version completed in 1945, Stravinsky also wrote a third version for two pianos in 1944; however, it is not so commonly performed.

== Notable recordings ==
Notable recordings of this composition include:

Orchestra	Conductor	Record Company	Year of Recording	Format	Version
RCA Victor Symphony Orchestra	Igor Stravinsky	Andante Records	1947	CD	Jazz Orchestra
Columbia Symphony Orchestra	Igor Stravinsky	CBS Records	1961	CD	Symphony Orchestra
London Symphony Orchestra	Antal Doráti	Deutsche Grammophon	1964	CD	Symphony Orchestra
Orchestre de la Suisse Romande	Ernest Ansermet	Decca Records	1964	CD	Symphony Orchestra
City of Birmingham Symphony Orchestra	Simon Rattle	EMI	1987	CD	Symphony orchestra
Philharmonia Orchestra	Eliahu Inbal	Teldec	1989	CD	Symphony orchestra
Danish Radio Symphony Orchestra	Dmitri Kitayenko	Chandos Records	1994	CD	Jazz orchestra
Orpheus Chamber Orchestra	—	Deutsche Grammophon	1996	CD	Jazz orchestra
Cincinnati Symphony Orchestra	Paavo Järvi	Telarc	2003	CD	Symphony orchestra
Budapest Festival Orchestra	Ivan Fischer	Channel Classics Records	2010	CD	Symphony orchestra
