= Richard Johnston (composer) =

Canadian composer, conductor, editor, folklorist and musician of American birth

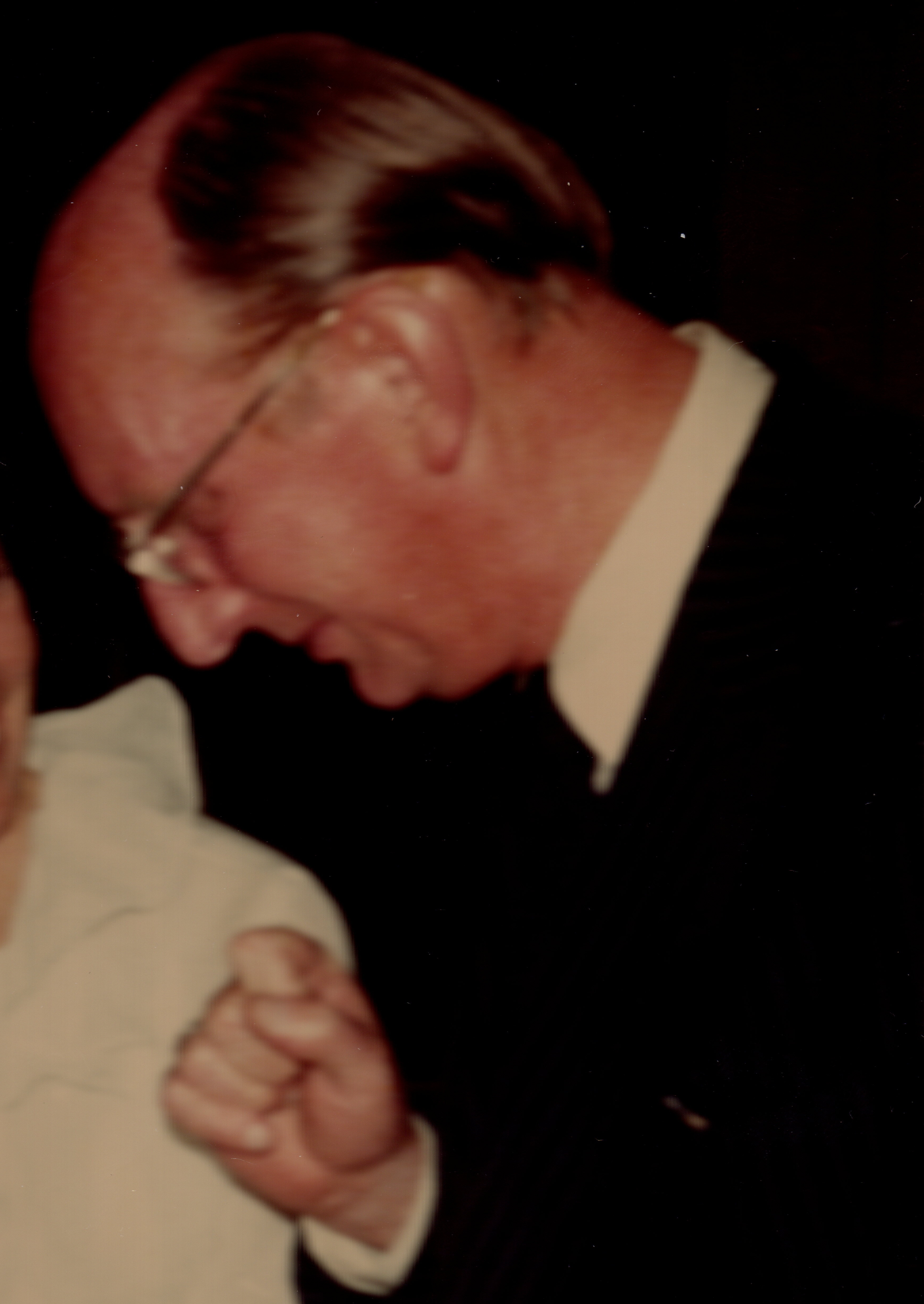
A profile photo of Dr. Richard Johnston, American/Canadian composer

Richard Johnston (7 May 1917 – 16 August 1997) was a Canadian composer, conductor, editor, folklorist, music critic, music educator, music producer, and university administrator of American birth. He became a naturalized Canadian citizen in 1957. An associate of the Canadian Music Centre, he was appointed a Member of the Order of Canada in February 1997. The library at the University of Calgary holds a substantial amount of his papers, manuscripts, and transcripts in its "Richard Johnston Canadian Music Archives Collection". His original fieldwork tapes and transcripts made during his research as a folklorist are part of the collection at the Canadian Museum of Civilization.

== Early life and education ==
Born Albert Richard Johnston in Chicago, he began his musical education with Ruth Crazier-Curtis. He entered Augustana College in Rock Island, Illinois in 1934 but left the school after just one year. He later matriculated to Northwestern University where he earned a Bachelor of Music in 1942. He briefly taught on the music faculty of Luther College in Wahoo, Nebraska before beginning private studies with Nadia Boulanger in Madison, Wisconsin in 1943–1944. With her he performed the world premiere of Igor Stravinsky's Sonata for Two Pianos (1944). He pursued graduate studies at the Eastman School of Music from 1944 to 1947 where he earned both a Master of Music and a Doctor of Philosophy in music. He later studied music education throughout Eastern Europe, notably with Zoltán Kodály in Hungary in 1965.

== Career ==
In 1947 Johnston immigrated to Canada to join the music faculty at the University of Toronto (UT). He taught at the school through 1968 during which time he taught classes in music theory and spent a few years as the school's choir conductor. One of his notable pupils at the UT was R. Murray Schafer. From 1954 to 1970 he was editor-in-chief of Songs for Today, a music publication for school music teachers. He served as president of the Ontario Music Educators' Association in 1958-1959 and in 1959 he helped establish the Canadian Music Educators' Association. From 1962 to 1968 he director of The Royal Conservatory of Music's Summer School where he also taught/supported courses in the Orff Schulwerk method and the Kodály Method of music education. He also was responsible for establishing the CAPAC-MacMillan lectures at the RCMT.

During the late 1940s through the 1960s, Johnston worked periodically for the Canadian Broadcasting Corporation as a composer, arranger, conductor, and commentator. On 12 October 1949 he conducted the chorus for the Canadian premiere of Benjamin Britten's Peter Grimes for the opening of the CBC Opera Company's second season with William Morton in the title role, Edmund Hockridge as Captain Balstrode, Frances James as Ellen Orford, Eric Tredwell as Swallow, and Gordon Wry as Bob Boles. The production was awarded the Best Music Program prize at the 1950 Canadian Radio Awards Competition. He was a commentator for the CBC Wednesday Night program Vienna, the Glorious Age (1951) and the radio series Folk Music, A Living Canadian Art (1958).

Johnston also had a lifelong interest in folk music; most notably collecting more than 200 previously un-published folksongs and Métis fiddle music from the Saskatchewan region in 1957 through the sponsorship of the Canadian Museum of Civilization and the Saskatchewan Arts Board. In 1956 he helped found the Canadian Society for Traditional Music. He worked extensively with Edith Fowke with whom he worked on the publications Folk Songs of Canada (Waterloo Music Company 1954), Folk Songs of Quebec (Waterloo 1957), Chansons canadiennes françaises (Waterloo 1964), and More Folk Songs of Canada (Waterloo 1967). He worked as a producer for two recordings with Joyce Sullivan: Folk Songs of Canada (for RCI, also with baritone Glenn Gardiner) and Folk Songs of Canada (Waterloo, also with Charles Jordan). The Ensemble Vocal Katimavik recorded his arrangement of the Canadian folk song J'ai cueilli la belle rose. In 1984 he served as editor-in-chief of Folk Songs North America Sings and worked in the same capacity for the Kodály Society of Canada's three volumes titled Kodály and Education in 1986.

In 1968 Johnston was appointed the Dean of Fine Arts at the University of Calgary (UC). He remained in that position until 1973, after which he taught on the UC's music faculty until his retirement from teaching in 1982. At the UC he notably established the composer archives and for many years managed their continual expansion. In 1971 he was a founding member of the Alberta Music Conference, serving as the group's first president from 1971 to 1973. From 1971 to 1974 he was the vice-president of the Canadian Music Council, later serving on the CMC's publications committee during the late 1970s. In 1973 he was editor-in-chief of the Western Board of Music piano series Horizons and in 1977 he became the Alberta Composers' Association's first president.

After Johnston's retirement from teaching, he continued to compose and remained active on the committees of the Canadian Music Centre and the Canadian Society for Traditional Music. He was named a professor emeritus at the UC in 1985 and the university presented a concert of his works on 16 October 1987 in honour of his 70th birthday and again in 1992 for his 75th birthday. He also occasionally gave guest lectures, the last of which was given in the year of his death at the 1997 Kodály Summer Program in Calgary. He died in Calgary at the age of 80. He was married for many years to the pianist Yvonne Guiguet who had died earlier in 1985.

== Selected works ==
- Suite for Bassoon and Piano. 1946 (orch 1946). Mel SMLP-4032 (Weait)
- Symphony No. 1. 1950. Orch. Ms
- 3 Suites for Piano. (No. 1, 2 1965, No. 3 1988). (No. 1) BMIC 1965, (No. 2) Ber 1969. (No. 2) CCM 1 (Cavalho)
- The Irish Book (S. O'Sullivan, A. O'Shaughnessy). 1971. High voice, piano. Wat 1971
- Portraits: Variations for Orchestra. 1972. Orch. Ms
- Answer Back (arr of folk songs). 1973. Bar, soprano, piano. Ms
- Folk Love Canadian Style (arr of folk songs). 1973. Med voice, piano. Ms
- Trio for Violin, Cello and Piano. 1978. Ms
- 5 Duo Concerti (1979–89). (No. 1) Vn, (2) bsn, (3) fl (piccolo), (4) trumpet, (5) saxophone; all with piano. Ms
- Poème for Orchestra. 1981. Orch. Ms
- Missa Brevis. 1984. Org. Ms
- Sextette. 1988. Woodwind quintet, piano. Ms
