= Letter from Home (Copland) =

1944 orchestral composition by American composer Aaron Copland

Letter from Home is a 1944 orchestral composition by Aaron Copland. The piece was commissioned as a patriotic work by Paul Whiteman for his Radio Hall of Fame Orchestra, and suggests the emotions of a soldier reading a letter from home. The music has been described as Copland's "most sentimental" and reflects his own homesickness in Mexico.

It is scored for flute, oboe, four saxophones, French horn, three trumpets, three trombones, tuba, guitar, piano, harp, percussion, and strings. The 1964 orchestral version is scored for two flutes, two oboes (oboe II is optional), two clarinets, optional bass clarinet, two bassoons (bassoon II is optional), two horns, two trumpets, two trombones, timpani, percussion (bells, suspended cymbal, triangle, bass drum), optional harp, optional piano, and strings.
