= Latin Grammy Award for Best Classical Album =

- Awarded for: Classical music albums recorded by Ibero-American composers, performers and/or directors.
- Country: United States
- Presented by: The Latin Recording Academy
- First award: 2000
- Currently held by: Isabel Dobarro and Javier Monteverde for Kaleidoscope - Contemporary Piano Music by Female Composers from Around The World (2025)
- Website: Latingrammy.com

The Latin Grammy Award for Best Classical Album is an honor presented annually at the Latin Grammy Awards, a ceremony that recognizes excellence and promotes awareness of cultural diversity and the contributions of Latin musicians in the United States and worldwide. The award is given every year since the 1st Latin Grammy Awards ceremony, which took place at the Staples Center in Los Angeles.

The description of the category at the 2020 Latin Grammy Awards states that "it encompasses movements of works that include from opera to compositions for symphony orchestras, instrumental or vocal soloists, chamber ensembles, choral music, electroacoustic music, etc." and includes classical music albums "in which participants are predominantly Latino composers, directors or performers in any of its forms: composition, performance, direction." The award is presented to solo artists, duos or groups, director, conductor, established orchestra/ensemble, producer(s), recording engineer(s) and mixing engineer(s) of 51% or more of the total playing time of the album.

Spanish singer and conductor Plácido Domingo is the most awarded artist in the category with four wins. He was also the first recipient of the award in 2000.

== Winners and nominees ==
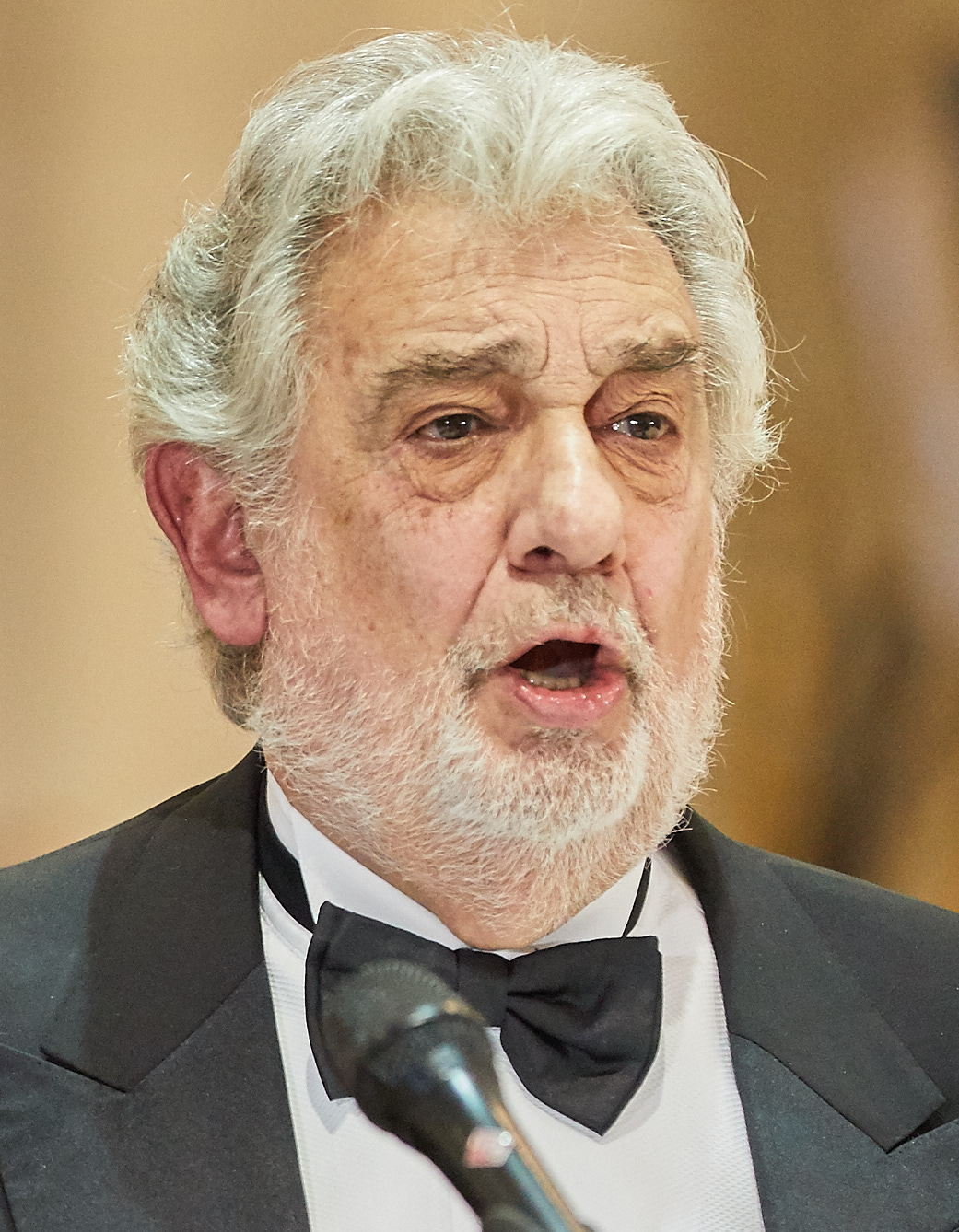
Spanish singer and conductor Plácido Domingo won the award in 2000, 2001, 2008 and 2014.

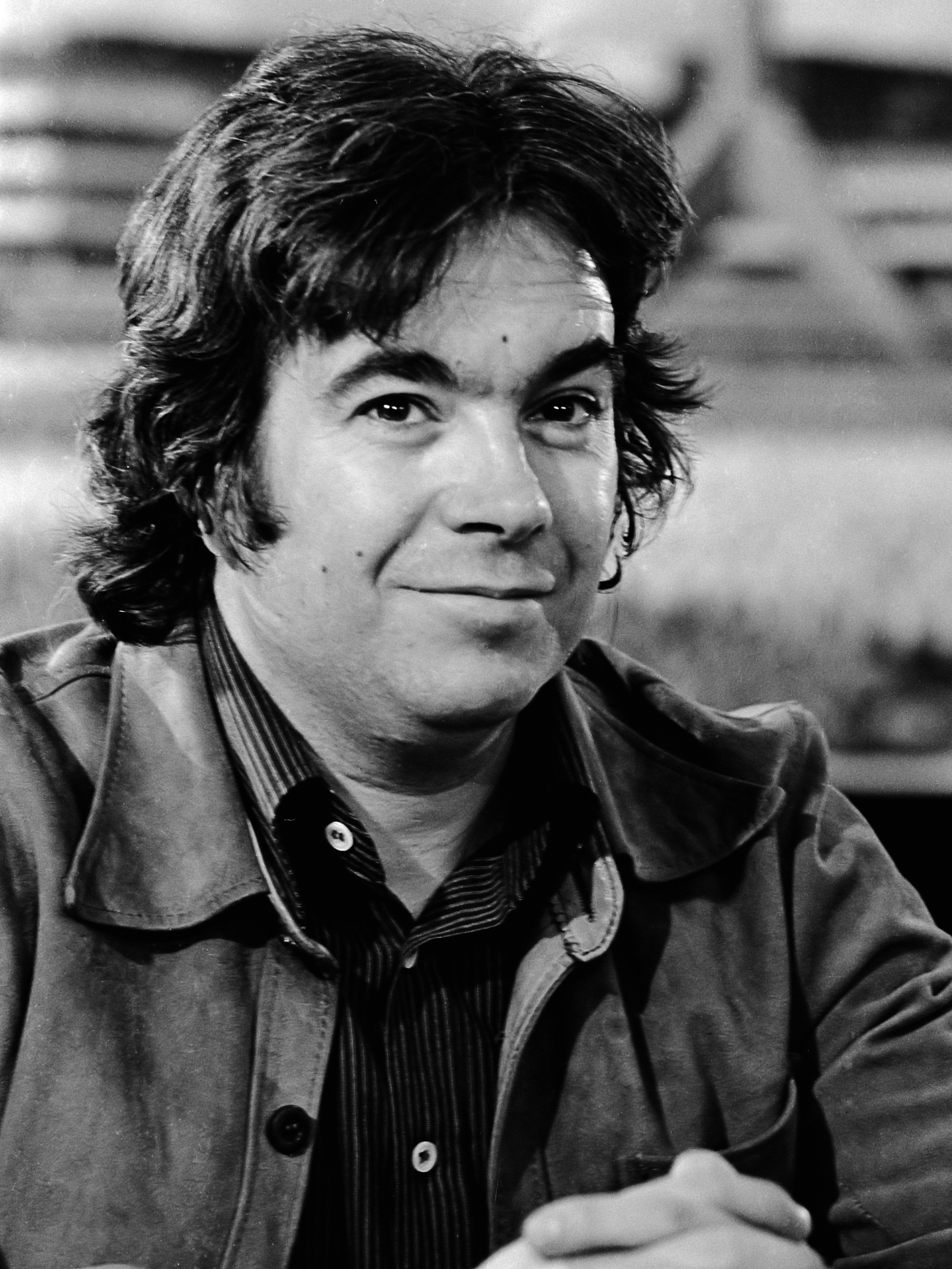
Spanish conductor Antoni Ros-Marbà was one of the inaugural winners in 2000.

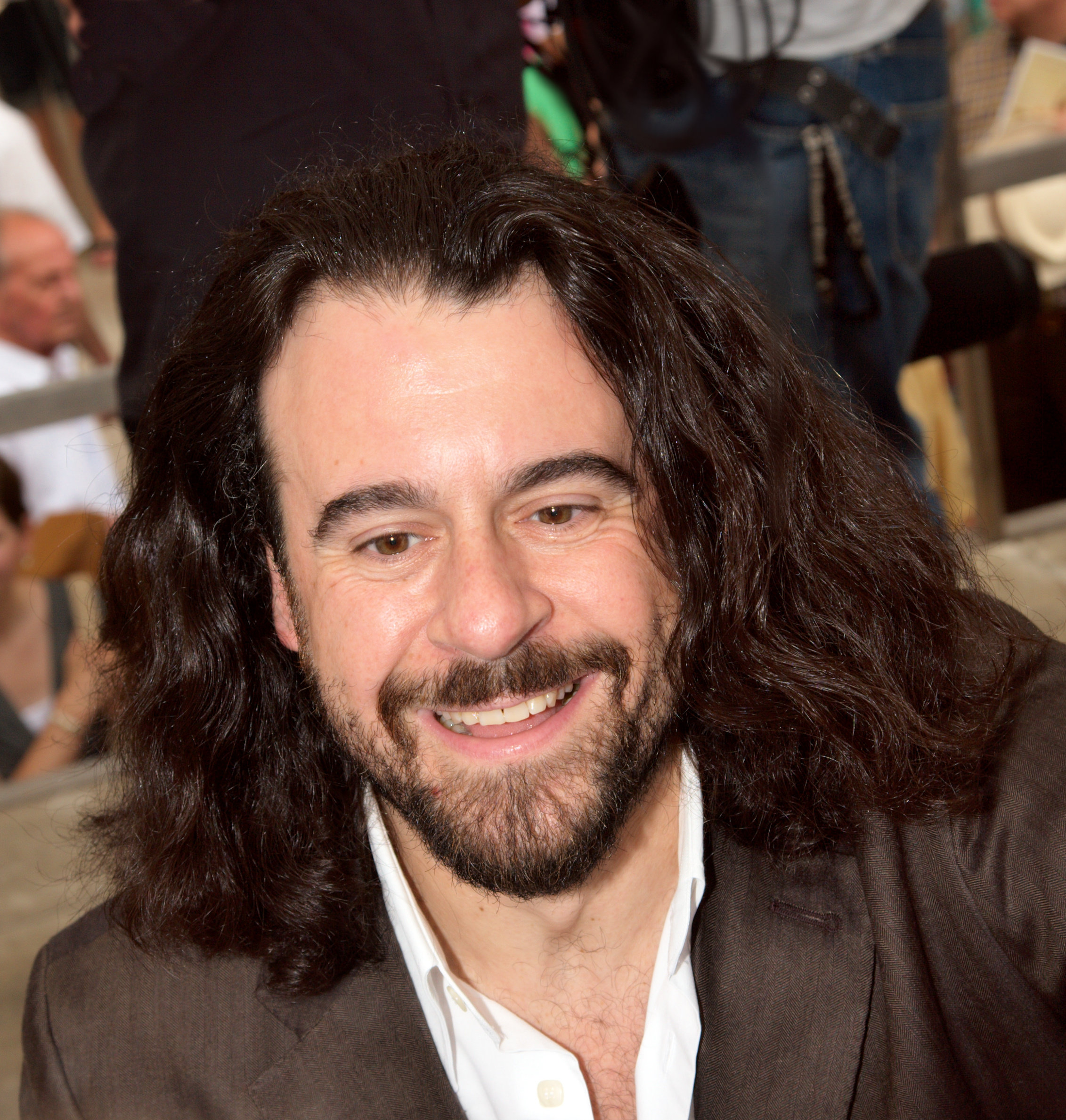
Spanish baritone Carlos Álvarez was one of the recipients of the award in 2001

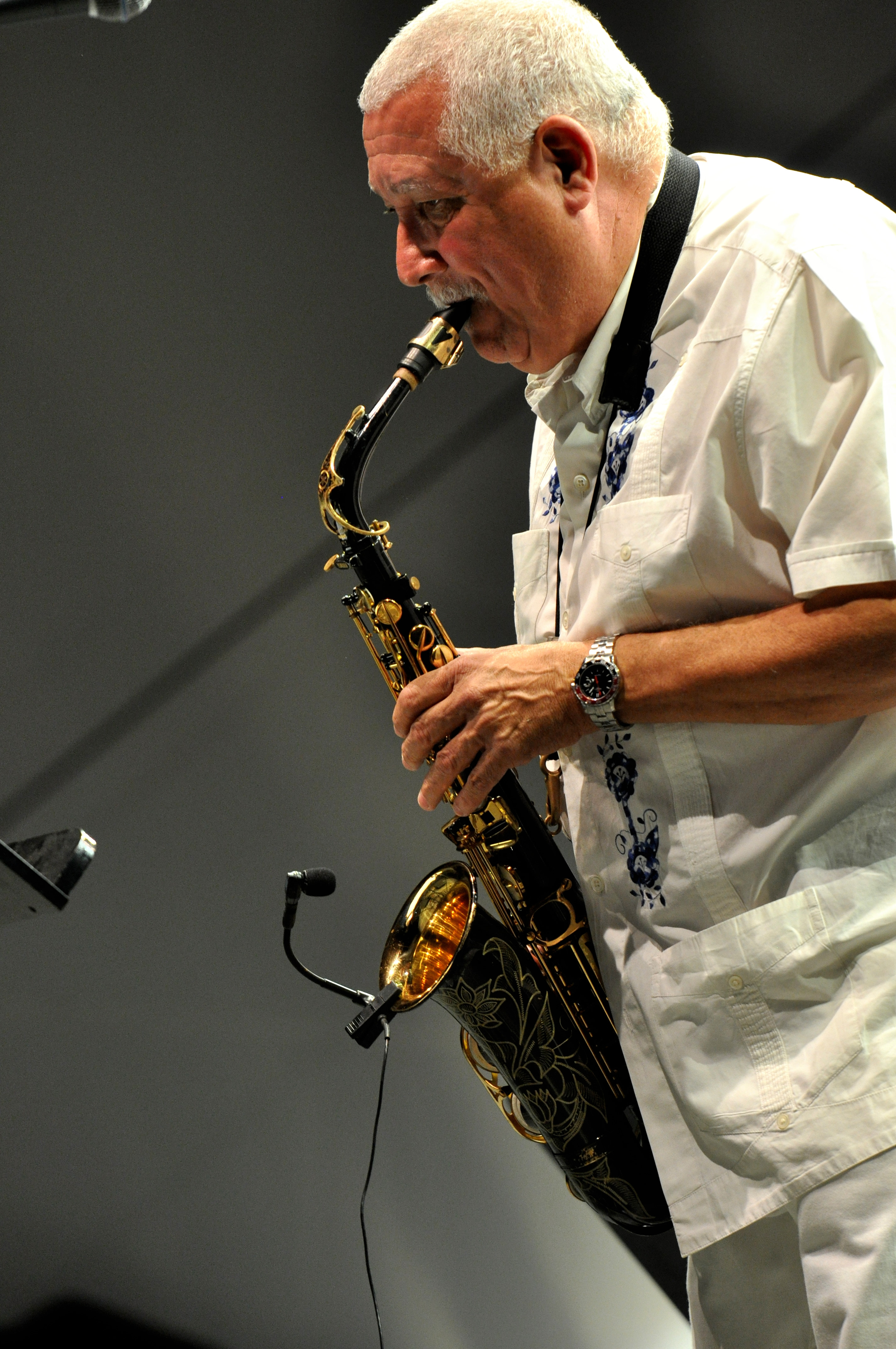
Cuban-American instrumentalist Paquito D'Rivera won the award in 2003 and 2005.

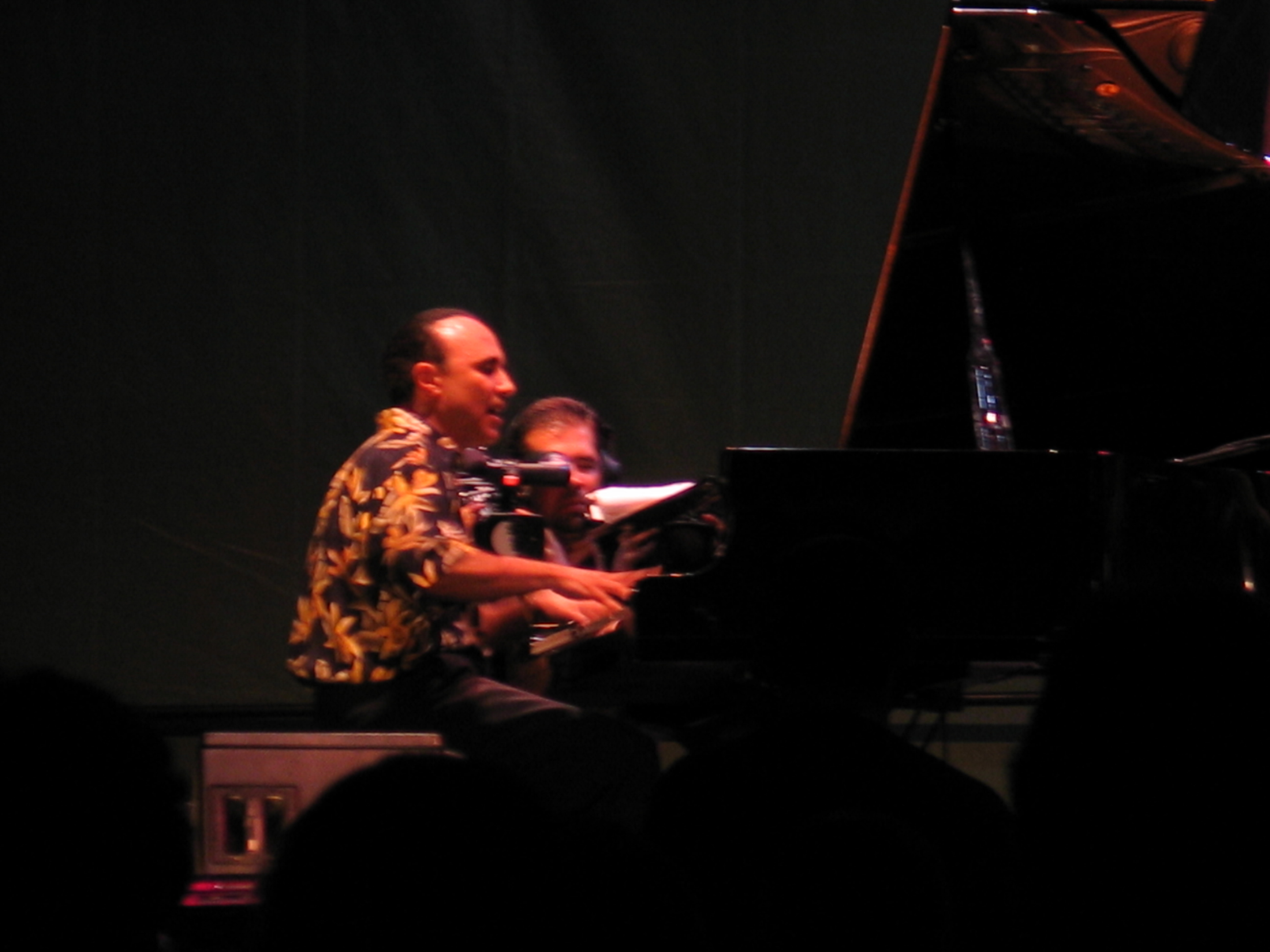
Dominican musician Michel Camilo won the award in 2006.

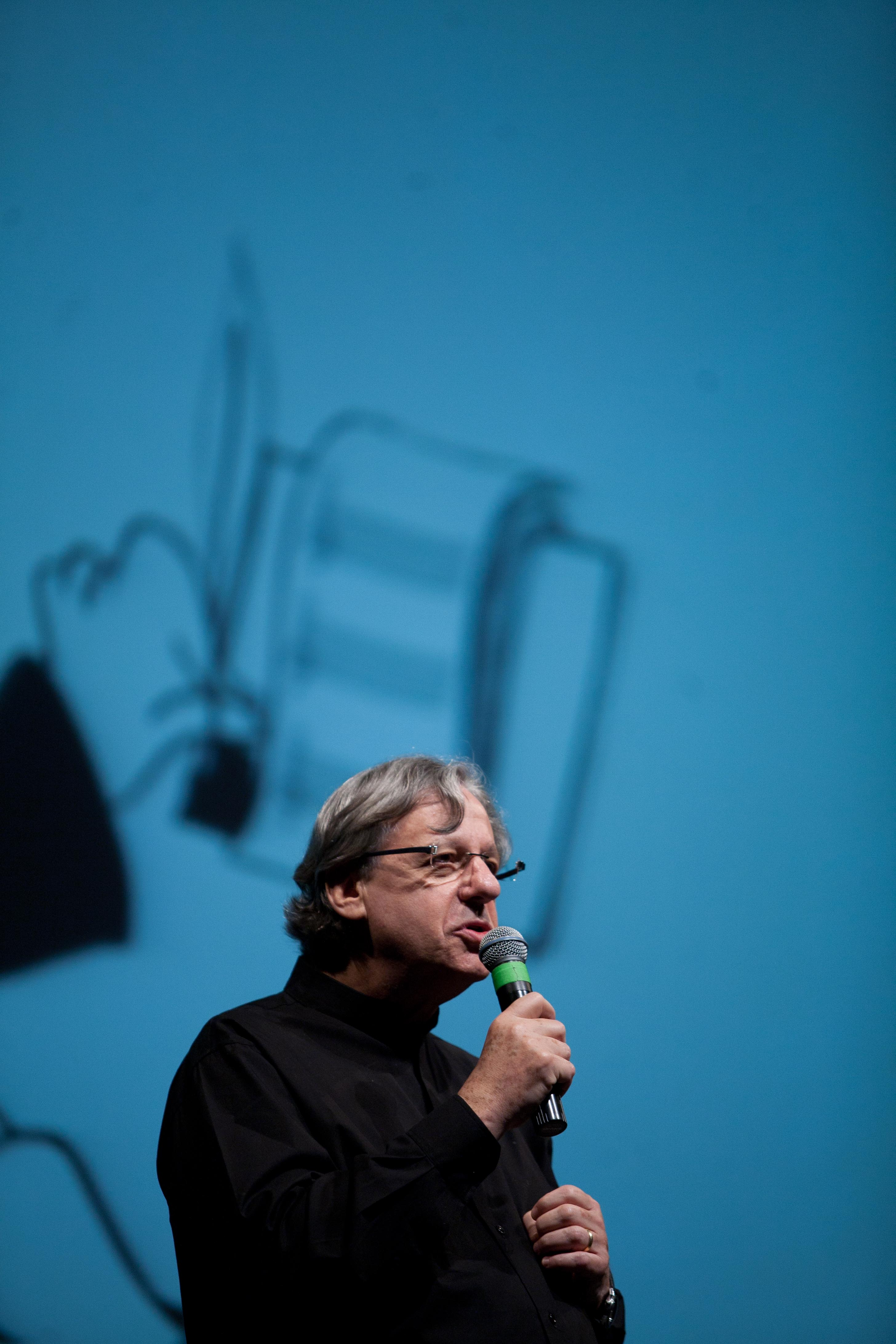
Brazilian conductor John Neschling won the award in 2007.

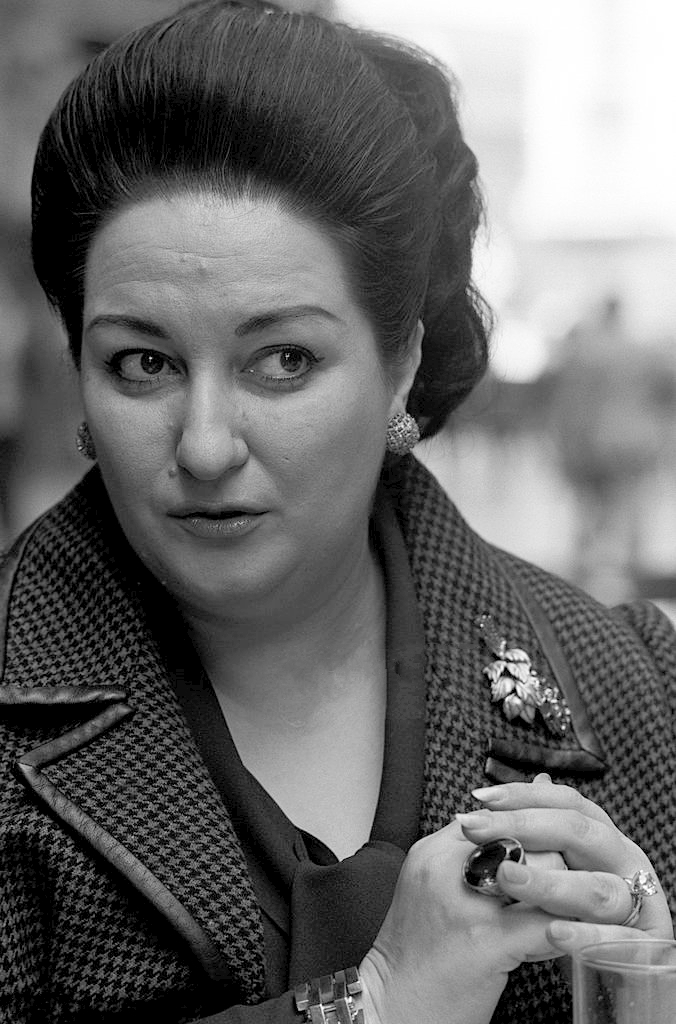
Spanish singer Montserrat Caballé won the award in 2007.

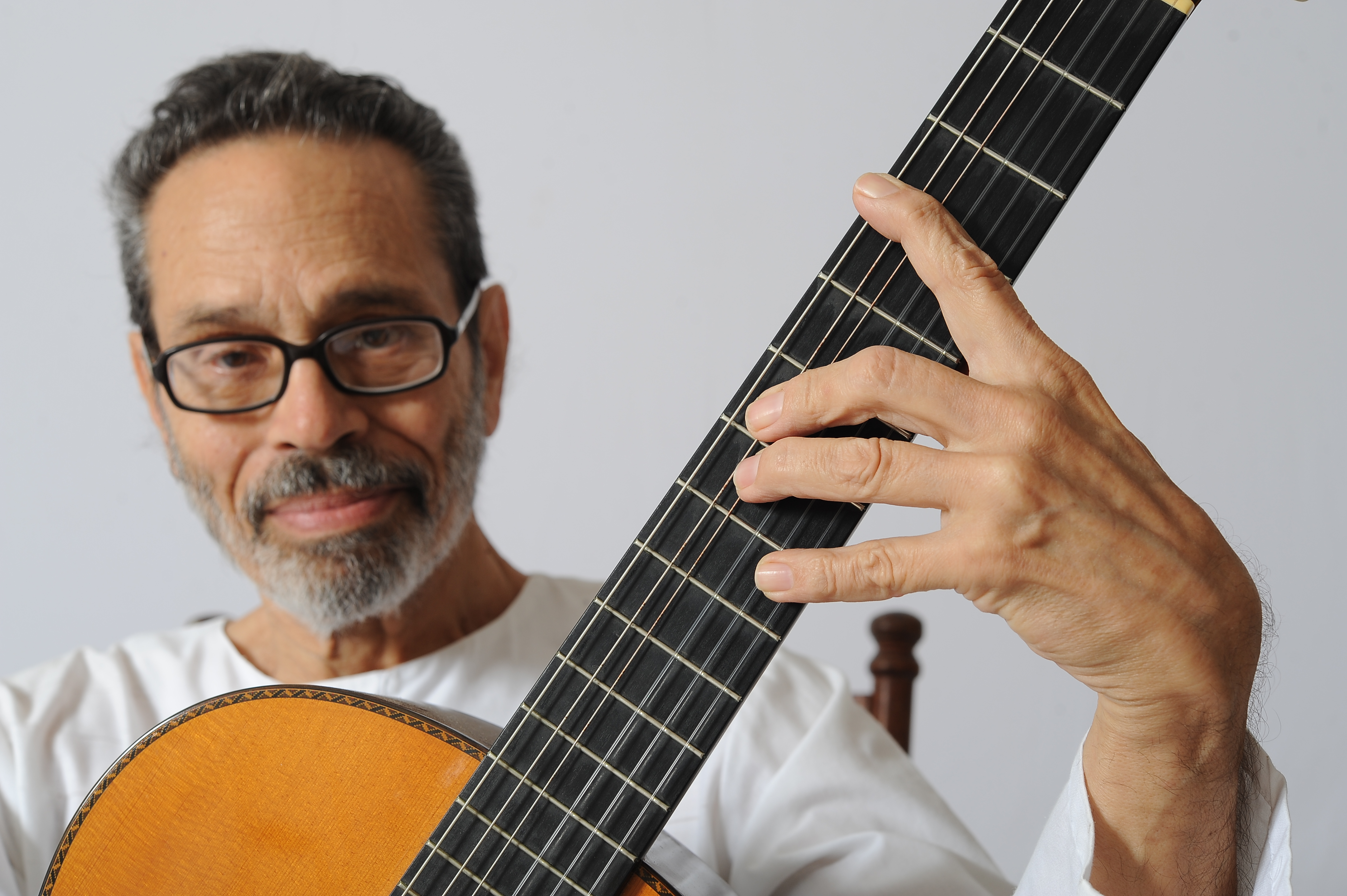
Cuban musician Leo Brouwer won the award in 2010.

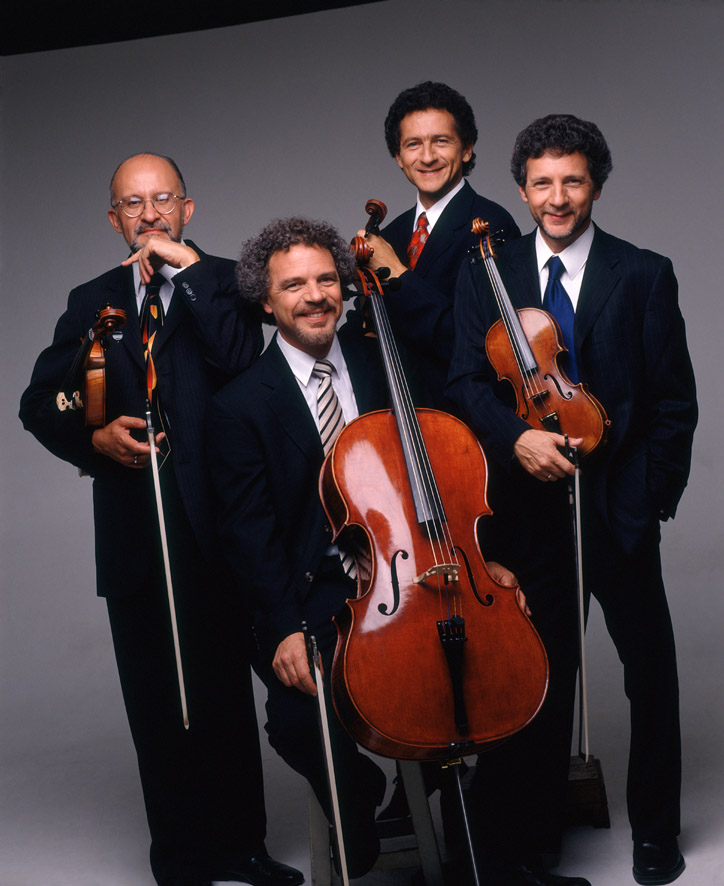
Mexican quartet Cuarteto Latinoamericano won the award in 2012 and 2016.

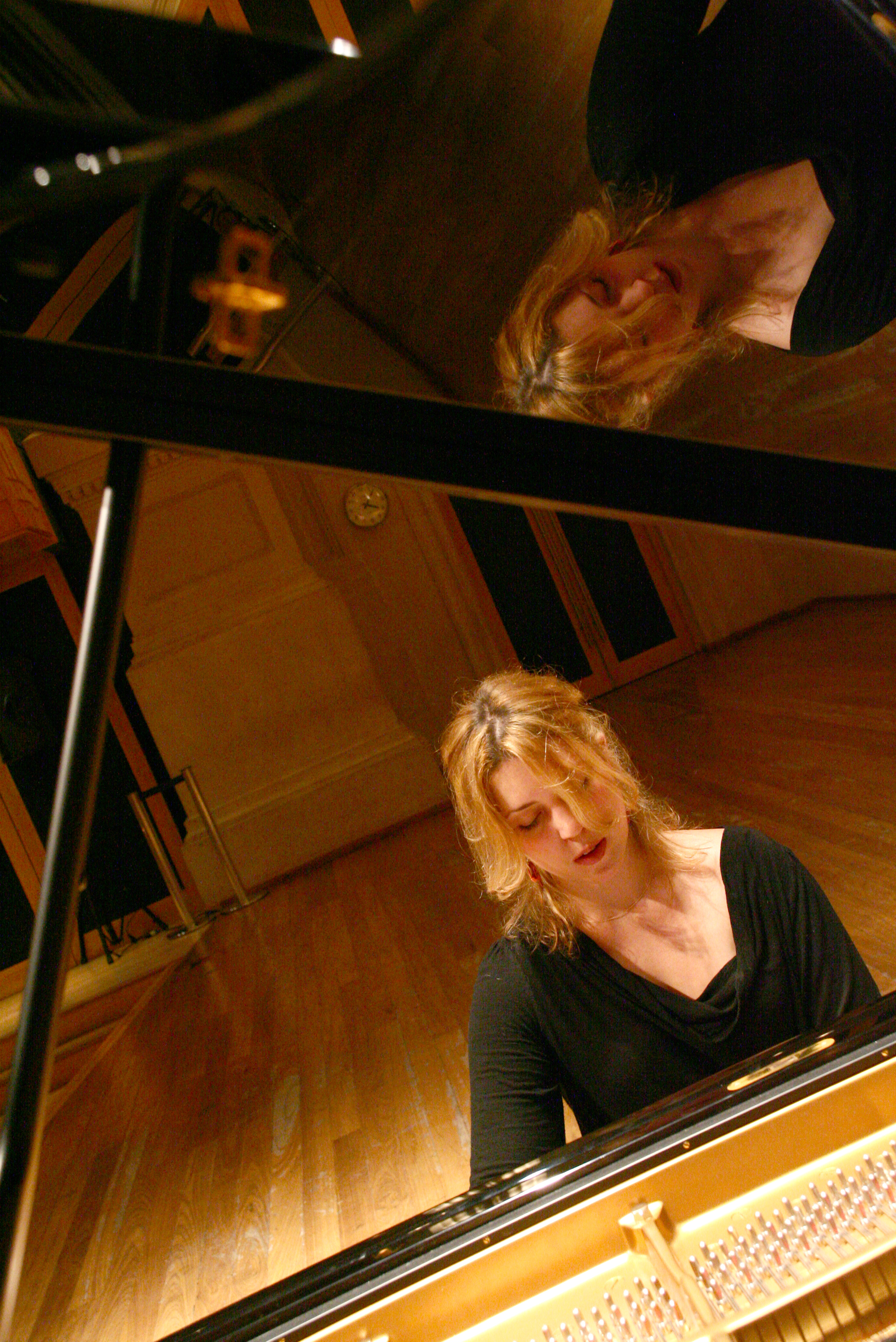
2015-winner, Venezuelan pianist Gabriela Montero.

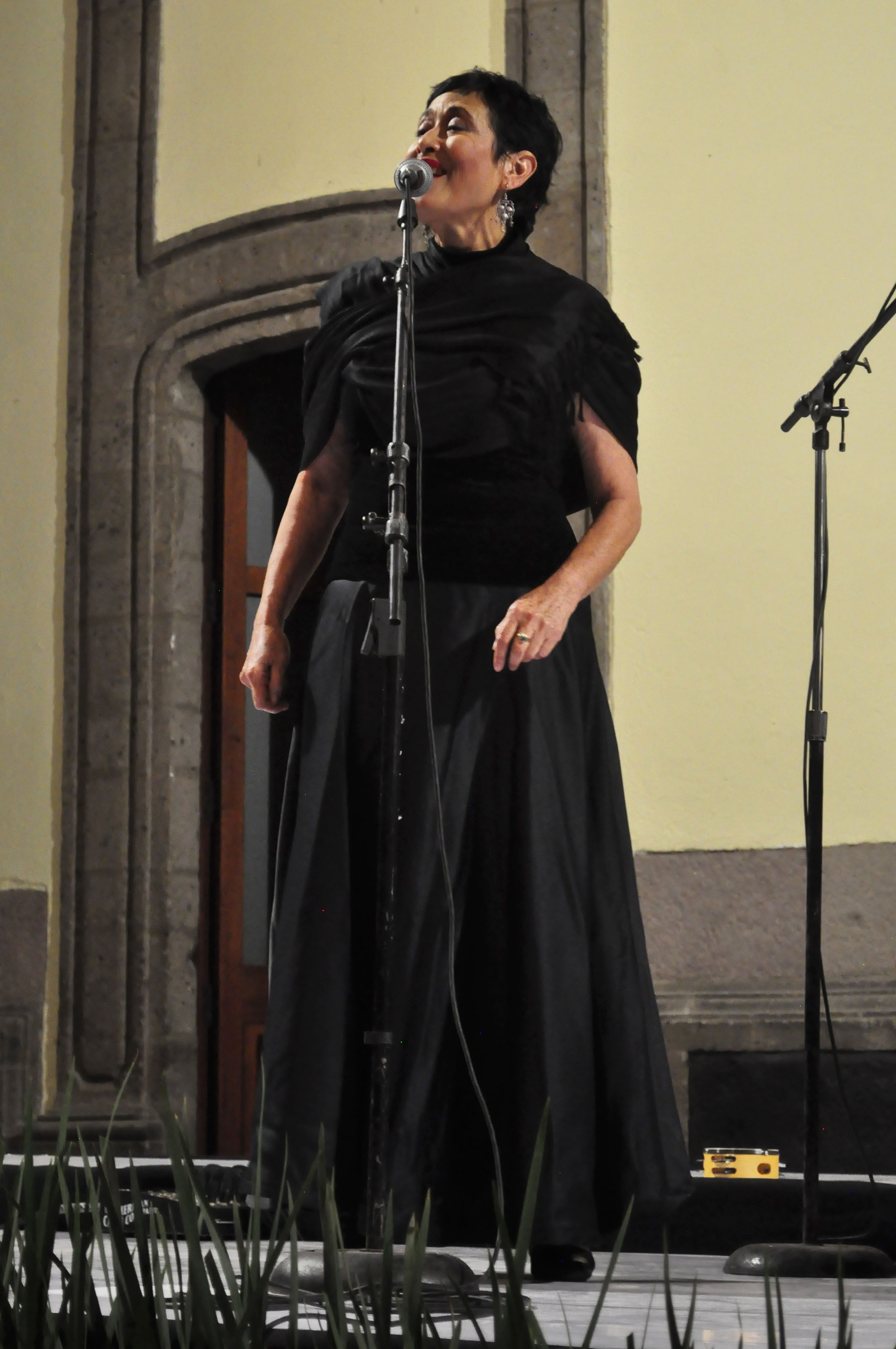
Mexican singer Jaramar won the award in 2016.

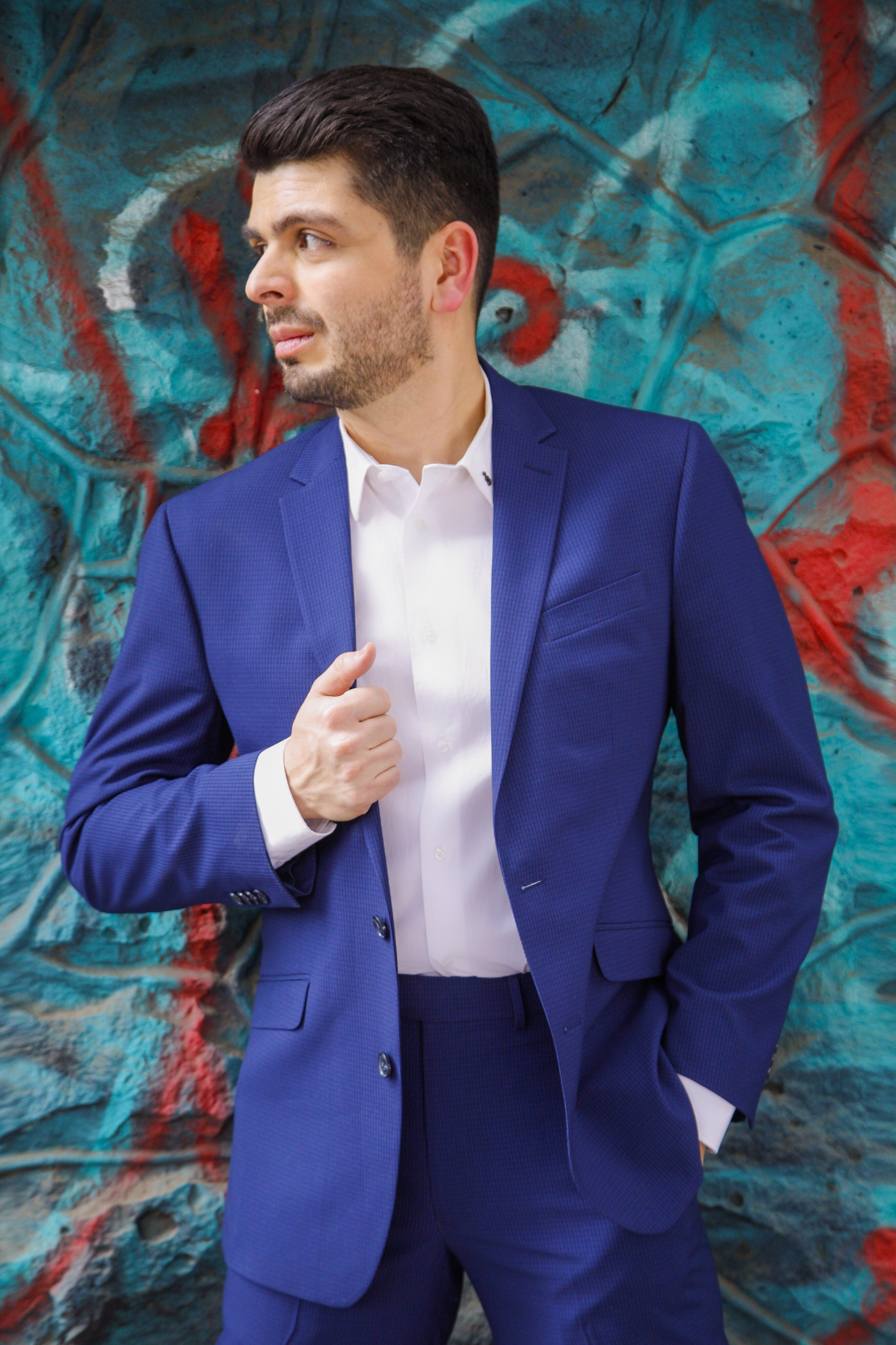
2021 winner, Venezuelan pianist Kristhyan Benítez.

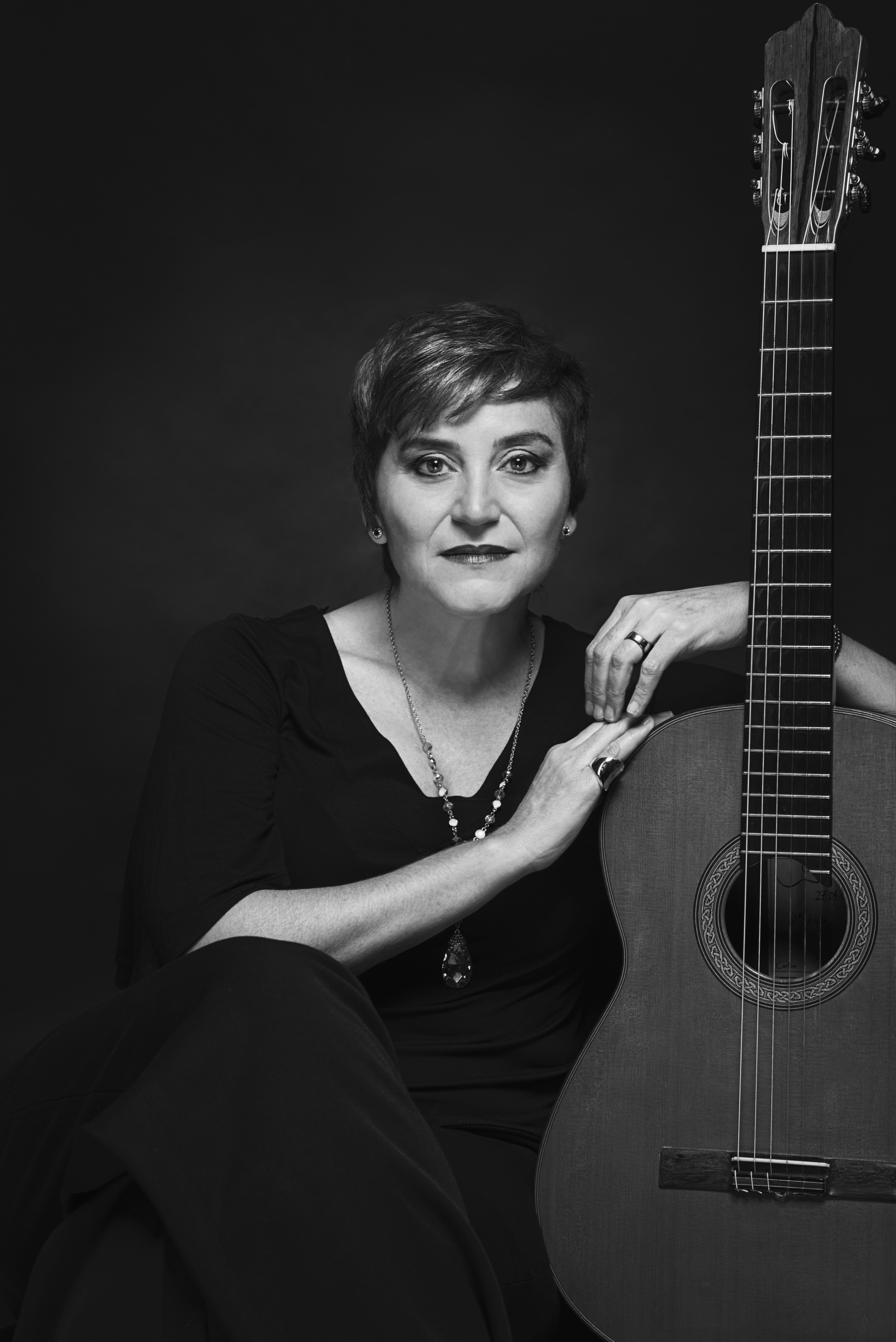
Paraguayan guitarist Berta Rojas won the award in 2022.

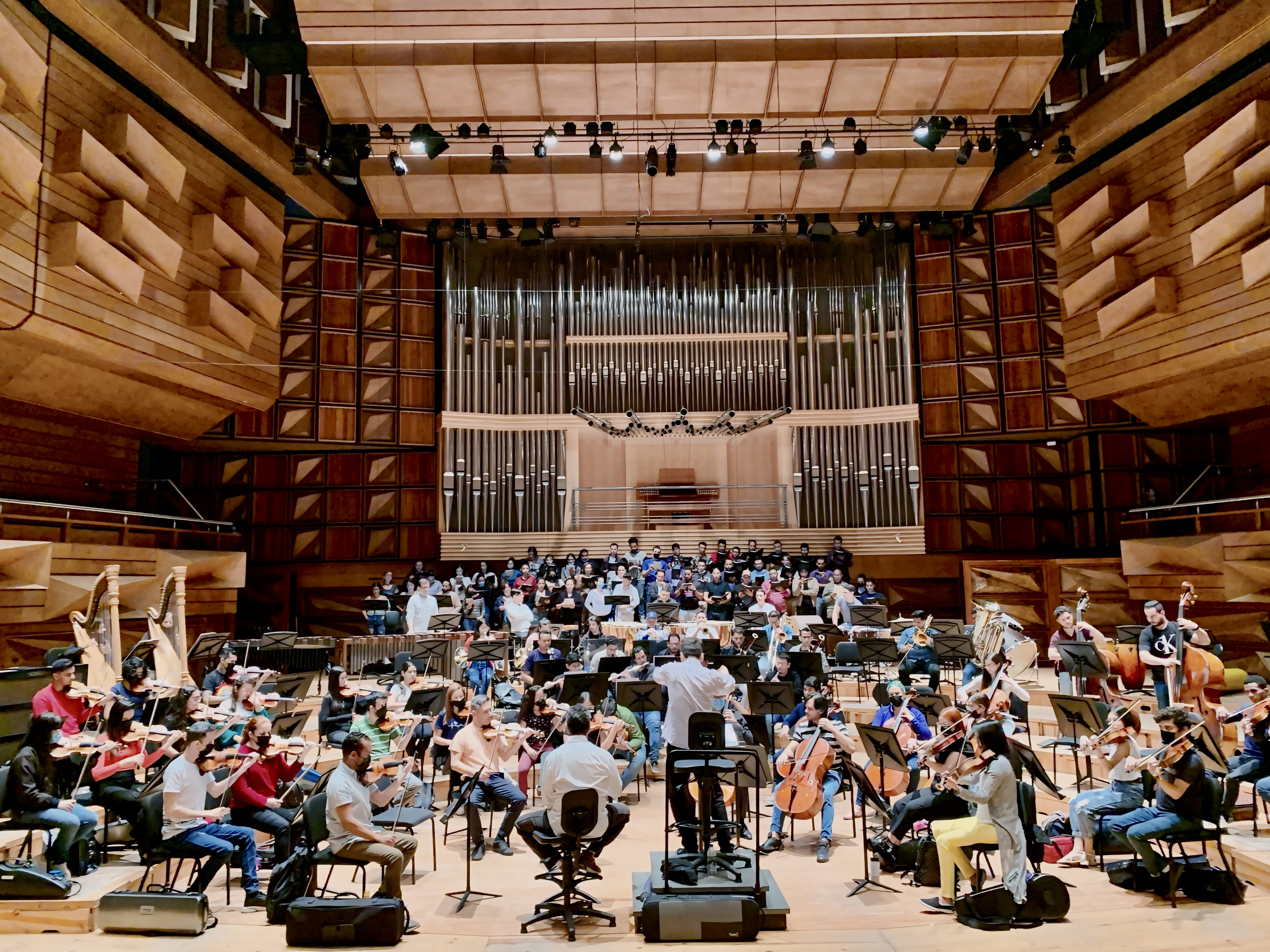
Simón Bolívar Symphony Orchestra & Simón Bolívar National Choir won the award in 2023.

Year	Recipient(s)	Work	Nominees	Ref.
2000	Tito Beltrán, Plácido Domingo, Manuel Lanza, Antoni Ros-Marbà & Elisabete Matos: Michael Haas, producer	La Dolores – Tomás Bretón	Aldo Antognazzi, Paquito D'Rivera and Brenda Feliciano (performers); Pablo Voitzuk & Diego Zapico (producers) – Música de dos Mundos; José María Vitier (performer); Ana Lourdes Martinez, Silvia Rodriguez Rivero & José María Vitier (producers) – Salmo de las Américas; Esa-Pekka Salonen (performer); David Mottley (producers) – Sensamayá: The Music of Silvestre Revueltas; Eduardo Diazmuñoz and La Filarmonica de la Ciudad de Mexico (performers); Eduardo Diazmuñoz & Ana Lara (producers) – Twentieth Century Mexican Symphonic Music, Vol. 1	
2001	Carlos Álvarez, Plácido Domingo, Jane Henschel, José De Eusebio and Ana María Martínez: Michael Haas, producer	Albeniz: Merlin	Myung-Whun Chung, Plácido Domingo and Ana María Martínez (performers); Lennart Dehn (producer) – Bacalov: Misa Tango; Benjamin Echenique (director); Marisa Canales (producer) – México Barroco/Puebla VIII – Maitines para Nuestra Señora de Guadalupe/Manuel Arenzana; Eduardo Diazmuñoz and Roberto Limon (performers); Eduardo Diazmuñoz & Alberto Núñez Palacio (producers) – Tango Mata Danzón Mata Tango; Alberto Cruzprieto, Mercedes Gómez, Roberto Kolb, Jaime Márquez & Jesús Medina (performers); Eugenio Toussaint (producer) – Toussaint: Gauguin	
2002	Quarteto Amazônia: Mario De Aratanha, producer	Adiós Nonino – Quarteto Amazônia Toca Astor Piazzolla	Pablo Roberto Diemecke and Jorge Federico Osorio (performers); Enrique Arturo Diemecke (conductor); Benito Alcocer (producer) – Chávez: Conciertos Para Violin y Piano; María Guinand (performer); Andres Priemer (producer) – Golijov: La Pasión Según San Marcos; Luiz de Moura Castro and María José Montiel (performers); Antonio Armet (producer) – Modinha – Brazilian Songs; Cuarteto Latinoamericano (performer); Bogdan Zawistowsky (producer) – Villa-Lobos: String Quartets, Vol. 6	
2003	Paquito D'Rivera: Dania Devora & Jose Luis Ruperez, producers	Historia del soldado	Jordi Savall and Capella Reial de Catalunya (performers); Nicolas Bartholomée (producer) – Biber: Requiem Á 15 Battalia Á 10; Maria Teresa Madeira (performer); Marcus Viana (producer) – Ernesto Nazareth 2 – Mestres Brasileiros Vol IV; Ángeles Blancas, Plácido Domingo, Elisabete Matos, García Navarro, Àngel Òdena, Stefano Palatchi, and María Rey-Joly (performers); José Luis Ramos Martín (producer) – Margarita La Tornera ....; Kronos Quartet (performer); David Harrington, Aníbal Kerpel, Gustavo Santaolalla & Judith Sherman (producers) – Nuevo	
2004	Various Artists: Mario Adnet & Paulo Jobim, producers	Jobim Sinfônico	Uakti (performer and producer) – Clássicos; Various Artists; Eugenio Toussaint (producer) – Eugenio Toussaint Música de Cámara; Trío Argentino (performer); Elías Gurevich, Fernando Pérez, Jorge Pérez Tedesco & Fabiola Russo (producers) – Schubert – Fauré; Joao Carlos Assis Brasil (performer and producer) – Villa-Lobos Bachianas Brasileiras Nº 4 e Cirandas João	
2004	Orquestra Simfònica de Barcelona I Nacional de Catalunya and José Serebrier: Robert Suff, producer	Carmen Symphony	Uakti (performer and producer) – Clássicos; Various Artists; Eugenio Toussaint (producer) – Eugenio Toussaint Música de Cámara; Trío Argentino (performer); Elías Gurevich, Fernando Pérez, Jorge Pérez Tedesco & Fabiola Russo (producers) – Schubert – Fauré; Joao Carlos Assis Brasil (performer and producer) – Villa-Lobos Bachianas Brasileiras Nº 4 e Cirandas João	
2005	Cuarteto de Cuerdas Buenos Aires and Paquito D'Rivera: Andrea Merenzón, producer	Riberas	Orquestra de Câmara Rio Strings (performer); David Chew & André Oliveira (producers) – Fantasia Brasileira; José Serebrier (performer); Tim Oldham (producer) – Glazunov Symphony Nº 5 / The Seasons; Leo Brouwer (performer); Leo Brouwer & Isabelle Hernández (producer) – Homo Ludens; Sharon Isbin (performer); José Serebrier (conductor); Tobias Lehmann (producer) – Rodrigo Concierto de Aranjuez/Villa Lobos: Concerto for Guitar / Ponce: Concierto del Sur	
2006	Michel Camilo and Ernest Martínez Izquierdo: Elaine Martone, producer	Rhapsody In Blue	Jeff von der Schmidt (conductor); Jan Karlin & Matthew Snyder (producers) – Chavez Complete Chamber Music, Vol. 3; Manuel Barrueco and Victor Pablo Pérez (performers); Martin Compton (producer) – Concierto Barroco; Edson Cordeiro (performer); José Ananias Souza Lopes (producer) – Contratenor; Eduardo Marturet conducting the Berliner Symphoniker (performers); Eduardo Marturet & Christian Feldgen (producers) – Encantamento; Mauro Senise and Jota Moraes (performers); Jota Moraes (producer) – Tempo Caboclo	
2007	John Neschling: John Neschling, conductor and producer	Beethoven Abertura Consagração Da Casa Sinfonia Nº 6	Southwest Chamber Music (performer); Jeff von der Schmidt (producer) – Chavez Complete Chamber Music, Vol. 4; Rolando Villazón (performer); Daniel Zalay (producer) – Gitano; Clara Sverner (performer); George Randolph (producer) – Mozart Volume 3	
2007	Montserrat Caballé: Carlos Caballé, producer	La Canción Romántica Española	Southwest Chamber Music (performer); Jeff von der Schmidt (producer) – Chavez Complete Chamber Music, Vol. 4; Rolando Villazón (performer); Daniel Zalay (producer) – Gitano; Clara Sverner (performer); George Randolph (producer) – Mozart Volume 3	
2008	Plácido Domingo: Sid McLauchlan, producer	Pasión Española	Gustavo Dudamel conducting the Simón Bolívar Youth Orchestra of Venezuela (performers); Sid McLauchlan (producer) – Fiesta; Sérgio and Odair Assad (performers); Françoise-Emmanuelle Denis (producer) – Jardim Abandonado; Sílvio Barbato and Turibio Santos (performers); Maria Clara Barbosa & Sérgio Barboza (producers) – Violão Sinfônico	
2009	Sonia Rubinsky: Nikolaos Samaltanos, producer	Villa-Lobos: Piano Music; Guia Pratico, Albums 10 and 11; Suite Infantil Nos. 1 and 2	Andrés Díaz (performer); Alan Bise (producer) – Bach: Cello Suites; Ricardo Kanji & Rosana Lanzelotte (performers); Anna Carolina Gomes (producer) – Cavaleiro Neukomm Criador Da Música De Câmara No Brasil; Ricardo Morales and the Pacifica Quartet (performers); Luis Enrique Juliá (producer) – Concierto De Aniversario	
2010	Leo Brouwer: Amado Del Rosario, producer	Integral Cuartetos de Cuerda	Yalil Guerra (performer and producer) – Old Havana. Chamber Music Vol. I; Camerata San Antonio (performer); Kenneth Freudigman & Ken David Masur (producers) – Salón Buenos Aires; John Neschling and Orquestra Sinfônica do Estado de São Paulo (performers); Uli Schneider (producer) – Tchaikovsky – Manfred; Southwest Chamber Music and Tambuco Percussion Ensemble (performers); Jan Karlin & Jeff von der Schmidt (producers) – William Kraft: Encounters	
2010	Fernando Otero: Fernando Otero, producer	Vital	Yalil Guerra (performer and producer) – Old Havana. Chamber Music Vol. I; Camerata San Antonio (performer); Kenneth Freudigman & Ken David Masur (producers) – Salón Buenos Aires; John Neschling and Orquestra Sinfônica do Estado de São Paulo (performers); Uli Schneider (producer) – Tchaikovsky – Manfred; Southwest Chamber Music and Tambuco Percussion Ensemble (performers); Jan Karlin & Jeff von der Schmidt (producers) – William Kraft: Encounters	
2011	Brazilian Guitar Quartet: Brazilian Guitar Quartet, producer	Brazilian Guitar Quartet Plays Villa-Lobos	Adonis González (performer); Rey Rodríguez (producer) – Adios A Cuba; Clara Sverner (performer); Jeffrey Ginn (producer) – Chopin; Francis Hime and Nelson Ayres (performers); Sylvia Medeiros (producer) – Concertino Para Percussão e Concerto Para Violão; José Serebrier (performer); Phil Rowlands (producer) – José Serebrier: Sinfonia No. 1; Manuel Barrueco (performer); Asgerdur Sigurdardottir (producer) – Tárrega!; Villa-Lobos Trio (performer); Markus Wallner (producer) – Villa-Lobos Trio Play: Heitor Villa-Lobos, Astor Piazzolla & Lucio Bruno-Videla	
2012	Cuarteto Latinoamericano: Dan Merceruio, producer	Brasileiro: Works of Francisco Mignone	Guillermo Figueroa, I Solisti di Zagreb and Pepe Romero (performers); Kresimir Seletkovic (producer) – Cordero: Caribbean Concertos for Guitar and for Violin; Javier Perianes (pianist); Josep Pons (conductor); BBC Symphony Orchestra; Martin Sauer (producer) – Da Falla: Noches en Los Jardines de España; José Serebrier (conductor); Bournemouth Symphony Orchestra; Phil Rowlands (producer) – Dvořák Symphony No. 7; In Nature's Realm, Scherzo Capriccioso; Gabriel Castagna (conductor); Orquesta Philarmonic De Württembergische Reutlingen; Reinhard Gelller & Die Tonaufnahme (producers) – Fiesta Criolla: Latin-American Orchestral Works; Quarteto Radamés Gnattali (performer); Sergio Roberto de Oliveira (producer) – Prelúdio 21: Quartetos das Ordas	
2013	Nelson Freire: Dominic Fyfe, album producer	Brasileiro	José Serebrier and St. Michel Strings (performers); Laura Heikinheimo (producer) – Adagio; Elaine Ortiz Arándes, Rafael Dávila, Manolo González, Guido Lebrón, Ilca López and Gil René (performers); Julio Bagué (producer) – Cofresí: Rafael Hernández; José Serebrier (performer); Phil Rowlands (album producer) – Dvořák Symphonies 3 & 6; Mario Adnet (performer and album producer) – Um Olhar Sobre Villa-Lobos; Isaac Karabtchevsky (performer); Ulrich Schneider (album producer) – Heitor Villa-Lobos Symphony No. 6 'On the Outline of the Mountains of Brazil'; Symphony No. 7	
2014	Plácido Domingo: Christopher Alder, album producer	Verdi	Facundo Ramírez (performer and album producer) – A Piazzolla A Ramírez; Allison Brewster Franzetti (performer); Carlos Franzetti (producer) – Alma – Piano Music Of Argentina; José Serebrier (performer); Alexander Van Ingen (album producer) – Dvorák: Symphony No. 2 – 3 Slavonic Dances; Manuel Barrueco (performer); Víctor Pablo Pérez (conductor); Martin Compton and Asgerdur Sigurdardottir (album producers) – Medea; Eddie Mora and Ana Catalina Ramirez (performers); Carlos Chaves & Leonardo Gell (album producers) – Musica de Compositores Costarricenses Vol.1; Berta Rojas (performer and album producer) – Salsa Roja	
2015	Débora Halász and Franz Halász: Marcelo Amaral, Debora Halász & Johannes Müller, album producers	Alma Brasileira	Fernando Otero (performer); Brian Forbes, Fernando Otero & Ruben Parra (album producers) – Ritual; Cuarteto Latinoamericano (performer); Dan Merceruio (album producer) – Ruperto Chapí: String Quartets 1&2; Iván Valiente (performer); Yalil Guerra (album producer) – Works for String Orchestra; José Serebrier (performer); Chris Hazel (album producer) – Dvorak-Serebrier Legends: Symphony No. 8	
2015	Gabriela Montero: Jonathan Allen, album producer	Rachmaninov: Piano Concerto No. 2, Op. 18 – Montero: Ex Patria, Op. 1 – Montero: Improvisations	Fernando Otero (performer); Brian Forbes, Fernando Otero & Ruben Parra (album producers) – Ritual; Cuarteto Latinoamericano (performer); Dan Merceruio (album producer) – Ruperto Chapí: String Quartets 1&2; Iván Valiente (performer); Yalil Guerra (album producer) – Works for String Orchestra; José Serebrier (performer); Chris Hazel (album producer) – Dvorak-Serebrier Legends: Symphony No. 8	
2016	Cuarteto Latinoamericano and Jaramar: Gerry Rosado, album producer	El Hilo Invisible (Cantos Sefaradíes)	Jordi Savall (performer); Manuel Mohino (album producer) – Biber: Baroque Splendor; Edith Peña (performer); Francisco Moya Castro (album producer) – Danzas En Todos Los Tiempos; A Corte Musical (performer); Rogerio Gonçalves & Eva Juárez (album producers) – Durón: Lagrimas, Amor. . .; Maximilian Hornung (cellist); José Serebrier (conductor); Philip Hobbs (album producer) – José Serebrier Conducts Samuel Adler	
2017	Eddie Mora directing The Orquesta Sinfónica Nacional de Costa Rica: Winnie Camila Berg, soloist; Carlos Chaves, album producer	Música de Compositores Costarricenses Vol. 2	Nathalie Peña Comas (performer and album producer) – Alta Gracia; Jordi Savall (performer and album producer) – Dixit Dominus: Vivaldi, Mozart, Handel; Horacio Gutiérrez (performer); Adam Abeshouse (album producer) – Horacio Gutiérrez Plays Chopin & Schumann; In-Hong Cha conducting The Orquesta Sinfónica de Venezuela (performers); Hildemaro Álvarez (album producer) – Textures from the North of South	
2018	Claudia Montero: José Manuel Domenech & Claudia Montero, album producers	Mágica y Misteriosa	Allison Brewster Franzetti and Carlos Franzetti (performers); James Fitzpatrick (producer) – Buenos Aires Noir; José Menor (performer); Francisco Moya Castro (album producer) – Enrique Granados: Goyescas; José Serebrier conducting Concerto Málaga String Orchestra; Juan Pablo Gamarro & José Manuel Gil De Gálvez (album producers) – José Serebrier Conducts Granados; Brasil Guitar Duo and David Amado conducting the Delaware Symphony Orchestra; Alan Jordan (album producer) – Leo Brouwer: The Book of Signs, Paulo Bellinati: Concerto Caboclo	
2019	Samuel Torres and La Nueva Filarmonía: Ricardo Jaramillo, conductor; Danilo Álvarez, Ricardo Jaramillo & Samuel Torres, producers	Regreso	Claudio Constantini (performer); Francisco Moya (album producer) – America; Edith Ruiz (performer and album producer) – Árboles De Vidrio; National Symphony Orchestra of Cuba (performer); Enrique Pérez Mesa (conductor); Aurelio De La Vega & Yalil Guerra (album producers) – Cuba: The Legacy; Orquesta Sinfónica de Heredia (performer); Eddie Mora (conductor); Jorge Castro, Carlos Pipo Chaves & Eddie Mora (album producers) – Solosh	
2020	Paulina Leisring & Domingo Pagliuca: Samuel Pilafian, album producer	Eternal Gratitude	Fabio Mechetti (conductor); Minas Gerais Philharmonic Orchestra & Sonia Rubinsky (soloist); Ulrich Schneider (album producer) – José Antônio de Almeida Prado: Piano Concerto No. 1 – Aurora – Concerto Fribourgeois; Ricardo Lorenz, Michigan State University Wind Symphony, Manuel Alejandro Rangel, Maracas & Kevin L. Sedatole (conductor); Sergei Kvitko & David Thornton (album producers) – King Mangoberry; Eddie Mora; Carlos Chaves & Eddie Mora (album producer) – La Voz del Ave; Elena Rivera y El Cuarteto Latinoamericano; Jc Vertti (album producer) – The Juliet Letters	
2021	Kristhyan Benitez: Jon Feidner, album producer	Latin American Classics	Jordi Savall & Le Concert des Nations (performers); Jordi Savall (conductor); Manuel Mohino (album producer) – Beethoven: Révolution, Symphonies 1 à 5; Ney Fialkow & Hugo Pilger (performers); Maria de Fátima Nunes Pilger & Hugo Pilger (album producers) – Claudio Santoro: A Obra Integral Para Violoncelo e Piano; Manuel Barrueco (performer); Asgerdur Sigurdardottir (album producer) – Music from Cuba and Spain, Sierra: Sonata para Guitarra; Héctor Infanzón (performer); Konstantin Dobroykov (conductor); Héctor Infanzón (album producer) – Tres Historias Concertantes	
2022	Berta Rojas: Sebastián Henríquez, album producer	Legado	Orquesta Sinfónica de Heredia (performers); Eddie Mora (conductor and album producer) – Brujos; Eddie Mora (performer); Carlos Chaves & Eddie Mora (album producers) – El Ruido del Agua; Erika Ribeiro (performer); Sylvio Fraga & Bernardo Ramos (album producers) – Erika Ribeiro – Ígor Stravinsky, Sofia Gubaidúlina e Hermeto Pascoal; Emmanuele Baldini, Pablo Rossi & Heitor Villa-Lobos (performers) – Villa-Lobos: Complete Violin Sonatas	
2023	Simón Bolívar Symphony Orchestra & National Choir; Ollantay Velasquez, conductor: Maria Beatriz Cardenas (Tatiz), Huáscar Barradas, Eugenio Carreño & Eduardo Martinez Planas, album producers	Huáscar Barradas Four Elements Immersive Symphony for Orchestra and Chorus	Kristhyan Benitez (performer); Jon Feidner (album producer) – Afro-Cuban Dances; Luis López (performer); Fernando Ortí Salvador (album producer) – Albéniz & Granados Piano Works –; Marvin Camacho & UCR Coral (performers); Didier Mora (conductor); Marvin Camacho Villegas & Jorge Castro Ruiz (album producers) – Cantata Negra; Orquesta Sinfónica de Minería & Pacho Flores (performers); Carlos Miguel Prieto (conductor); Ingo Petry (album producer) – Estirpe	
2024	Los Angeles Philharmonic, Anne Akiko Meyers & Gustavo Castillo, performers; Gustavo Dudamel, conductor: Dmitry Lipay, album producer	Fandango	Nueva Filarmonía (performer); Ricardo Jaramillo (conductor); Ricardo Jaramillo, Jefferson Rosas & Marcela Zorro (album producers) – Aire, Aire... No Puedo Respirar; Simón Bolívar Symphony Orchestra & Simón Bolívar National Choir, Iván Cardozo, Fernando Escalona, Claudio González, Jhoxiris Medina & Grace Terán (performers); Christian Vásquez (conductor); Maria Beatriz Cárdenas, Eugenio Carreño & Eduardo Martínez Planas (album producers) – Credo for Orchestra, Choir and Five Soloists; Lincoln Trio (performers); Daniel Binelli & Ted Viviani (album producers) – Fantasies of Buenos Aires; ADDA Simfònica Alicante (performers); Josep Vicent (conductor); Fernando Arias (album producer) – The Latin Rites	
2025	Isabel Dobarro: Javier Monteverde, album producer	Kaleidoscope - Contemporary Piano Music by Female Composers from Around The World	Ausiàs Parejo (performer); José Luis Ruiz Del Puerto (album producer) – Brouwer, Erena & Others: Guitar Works; Los Angeles Philharmonic, Los Angeles Master Chorale, María Dueñas (performers); Gustavo Dudamel (conductor); Dmitry Lipay (album producer) – Gabriela Ortiz: Revolución Diamantina; São Paulo Chamber Soloists (performer and album producers) – Radamés; Susana Gómez Vázquez (performer); Gonzalo Noqué (album producer) – Sisters of the Moon	
