= Cuarteto Latinoamericano =

Mexican string quartet

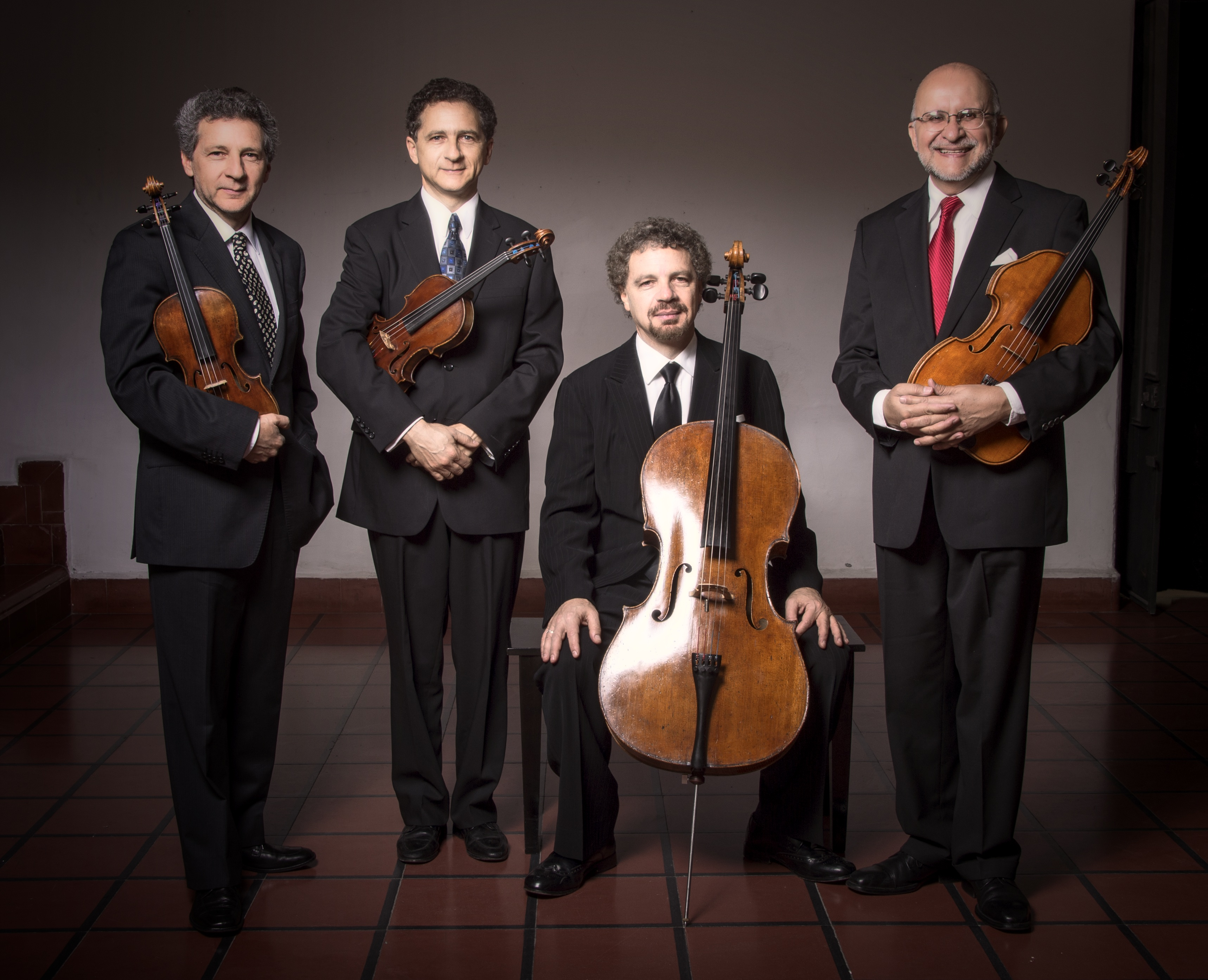
- Cuarteto Latinoamericano (From left to right) Arón Bitrán, Saúl Bitrán, Alvaro Bitrán, and Javier Montiel

Background information
- Origin: Mexico City, Mexico
- Genre: Latin American
- Years active: 1981–2026
- Members: Saúl Bitrán – violin I, Arón Bitrán – violin II, Javier Montiel – viola, Álvaro Bitrán – cello

Cuarteto Latinoamericano was a string quartet from Mexico. Founded in 1981, it disbanded in June of 2026, with a celebratory concert at the Palacio de Bellas Artes in Mexico City. The quartet toured frequently in Europe, The Americas, Israel, China, Japan, and New Zealand. They premiered over 100 works written for them. The members of Cuarteto Latinoamericano were the three Bitrán brothers—violinists Saúl and Arón, and cellist Álvaro—along with violist Javier Montiel.

== History ==
Formed in Mexico in 1981, Cuarteto Latinoamericano was the quartet-in-residence at Carnegie Mellon University in Pittsburgh from 1987 until 2008. They have collaborated with many artists, including cellist János Starker, pianist Santiago Rodriguez, tenor Ramón Vargas, and guitarists Sharon Isbin and Manuel Barrueco. With Barrueco, they played in venues in the US and Europe, recorded two CDs, and commissioned guitar quintets from American composers Michael Daugherty and Gabriela Lena Frank.

Under the auspices of the Sistema Nacional de Orquestas Juveniles of Venezuela, the quartet created the Latin American Academy for String Quartets, based in Caracas, which was active from 2008 to 2014. The academy served as a training ground for five select string quartets from El Sistema. Cuarteto Latinoamericano is represented in the United States by Tom Gallant at General Arts Touring. Between 2004 and 2021, they were recipients of the México en Escena grants given by the Mexican government through FONCA (National Fund for Culture and the Arts).

== Recordings ==
Cuarteto Latinoamericano produced over 100 CDs, including the complete works for quartets by Heitor Villa-Lobos, Silvestre Revueltas, Alberto Ginastera, Rodolfo Halffter, Carlos Chávez, Manuel M. Ponce, Mario Lavista, Francisco Mignone, Julián Orbón, Ruperto Chapí, and other composers.

For Élan Recordings, they recorded Ginastera: The Three String Quartets and Latin American String Quartets, which included the world premiere recordings of Orbón's String Quartet and Lavista's Reflejos de la Noche. As of 2021, Cuarteto Latinoamericano is under a recording agreement with Sono Luminus, under which they have released five albums:

- Encores (2010)
- Mexican Romantic Quartets (2011)
- Brasileiro: Works of Mignone (2012)
- Ruperto Chapí: String Quartets Vol. 1 (2014)
- Ruperto Chapí: String Quartets Vol. 2 (2021)

== Accolades ==
The Cuarteto Latinoamericano won two Latin Grammy Awards for Best Classical Album, and were awarded the Diapason d'Or, the Mexican Music Critics Association Award, and three "Most Adventurous Programming" Awards from Chamber Music America.

Volume 6 of their Villa-Lobos cycle of 17 string quartets on Dorian was nominated for a Grammy Award and a Latin Grammy for Best Chamber Music Recording. Their albums Brasileiro: Works of Mignone (2012) and El Hilo Invisible (2016) won Latin Grammy Awards for Best Classical Album. The work Inca Dances by Gabriela Lena Frank, recorded by Cuarteto Latinoamericano with Manuel Barrueco, won the 2009 Latin Grammy for Best New Latin Composition.

Their sixth and final recording of Heitor Villa-Lobos's string quartets, Quartets No. 4, 9, and 11, was nominated for two Grammy Awards (Best Chamber Music and Best Latin Music) in 2002. Brasileiro: Works of Mignone (2012) won the Latin Grammy Award for Best Classical Album. Their 2015 album El Hilo Invisible, with Mexican singer Jaramar, won the 2016 Latin Grammy Award for Best Classical Album. Ruperto Chapí: String Quartets Vol. 1 was nominated for a Latin Grammy the same year.

== Members ==
- Saúl Bitrán: violin
- Arón Bitrán: second violin
- Javier Montiel: viola
- Alvaro Bitrán: cello
