= Pagina de Buenos Aires =

"Pagina De Buenos Aires"

Song by Fernando Otero

from the album Pagina de Buenos Aires
- Released: January 2008
- Recorded: 2005
- Genre: Classical, tango
- Length: 4:07
- Label: Nonesuch
- Songwriter(s): Fernando Otero

Pagina de Buenos Aires is a piece by Argentine composer, pianist, and vocalist Fernando Otero, recorded in 2007 and released on his studio album Pagina de Buenos Aires on the Nonesuch label in 2008. The piece starts in the key of A minor and modulates twice, moving towards C minor and later to G minor. The version included in the album is shorter in comparison to live performances, with a duration of 4:07 minutes. The title of the piece "Pagina de Buenos Aires" means "Buenos Aires' story". It was based on Otero’s earlier composition "No Pudo Ser", written in Buenos Aires in 1993, of which he kept the melodic part and re-arranged the rest with some additions. It would prove to be one of Otero's most well-known and popular compositions, and it has been recorded by many artists using different arrangements and orchestrations.

== Personnel ==
Musician Credits : -Fernando Otero, piano -Humberto Ridolfi, violin -Inbal Segev, cello -Pedro Giraudo, acoustic bass -Hector Del Curto, bandoneon

Production Credits : -Produced by Fernando Otero -Engineered by Julio Pena - Recorded in New York City -Mixed by Aneiro Taño & Jean B. Smit - -Mastering by Bob Ludwig -Executive Producer: Robert Hurwitz
