= Simone Menezes =

Italo-Brazilian conductor

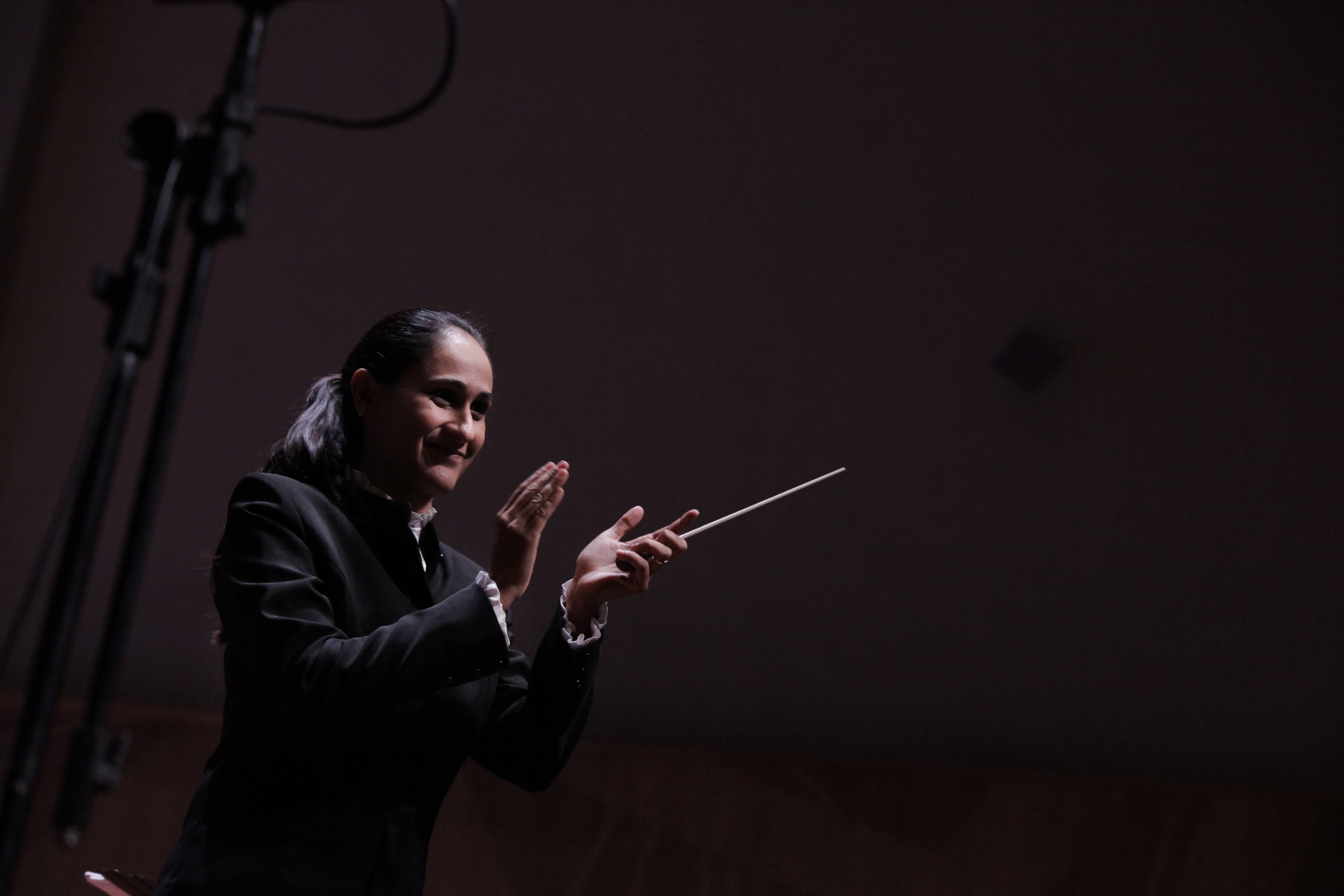
- Born: 22 January 1977 (age 49); Brasília, Brazil
- Citizenship: Brazil and Italy
- Occupations: Conductor, Artistic Director
- Website: www.simonemenezes.com

Simone Menezes (born 22 January 1977) is an Italo-Brazilian conductor based in France.

== Early life ==
Simone Menezes (born 22 January 1977) is an international conductor and artistic director based in Paris. She is the founder and artistic director of Ensemble K and has conducted many of the world’s leading orchestras, including the Los Angeles Philharmonic, Philharmonia Orchestra, Orchestre de Paris, BBC Scottish Symphony Orchestra, hr-Sinfonieorchester, Orchestra dell’Accademia Nazionale di Santa Cecilia, and Gürzenich Orchestra Cologne, among others. She is recognized for her musical excellence and for the creation of large-scale interdisciplinary cultural projects with worldwide impact.

== Career ==
On her return to Brazil, from 2008 until 2012 she assumed the direction of the Unicamp Symphony Orchestra and became, after Ligia Amadio, only the second woman to be a conductor of a professional orchestra in Brazil. While at the orchestra of UNICAMP, her project "Panorama da Musica Brasileira" received the prize awarded by the São Paulo State Association of Critics. She developed several multidisciplinary projects including dance, music, technology and premiered more than 20 works.

In 2013, she founded and directed the "Camerata Latino Americana", an ensemble specialized in the interpretation of Latin American repertoire and attracted the attention of the ISPA International Society for the Performing Arts of New York and the Association of British Orchestras in London.

In 2014, she founded with the pianist Sonia Rubinsky the "Villa Lobos Project", a project dedicated to promoting the work of the composer Villa-Lobos and classical Brazilian music internationally; the development of a reflection on Brazilian identity in partnership with other artists, researchers and the general public; the realization of artistic and cultural projects such as concerts, masterclasses and publications.

Since 2014, she has been mentored by Paavo Järvi and works as his assistant on several projects.

In 2019, she was awarded second prize in the European competition MAWOMA (Master Woman Orchestra) for female orchestra conductors at the Musikverein in Vienna. In the same year, she made her Japanese debut with the Osaka Symphony Orchestra and Chofu International Music Festival.

Menezes was the second woman to hold the position of chief conductor of a professional orchestra in Brazil, after Lígia Amadio. Today she is widely regarded as the most internationally prominent Brazilian conductor of her generation. She has always been engaged in numerous multidisciplinary projects and her style is considered as innovative. She has worked with composers such as: Thomas Ades, Esteban Benzecry, Lera Auerbach, Philippe Hersant.

In 2019, she launched a new project called "K", an orchestral ensemble formed by musicians from several countries to explore unusual repertoires and multidisciplinary projects. The ensemble is based in Lille, Belgium and Paris.The Ensemble K released in 2020 his first album Accents by the label Aparté acclaimed by the press and said by the newspaper le monde "Founded in 2019 by the Italian-Brazilian conductor Simone Menezes, Ensemble K calls itself: Klassique, Kosmopolite, Kontemporain, Kréatif, Connected”. And that's true ! " And in 2022, she created with her orchestra K lhe a multiforme musical project "Metanoia", the project launched by the German label Accentus, includes a CD, a touring and the documentary Metanoia that brings a fresh discussion about classical music, art and photography. The documentary is signed by the Grammy winner Paul Smaczny and features Italian thinker Alberto Cavali, German painter Michael Triegel and conductor Antonio Pappano.

In 2021 Philharmonie de Paris commissioned a symphonic project around Amazon Rainforest that Simone developed in partnership with the photographer Sebastiao Salgado, a concert combining the music of Villa-Lobos and Philip Glass with the images of the photographer. The project, acclaimed by "The Guardian", made its debut at the Philharmonie de Paris and went on tour in several cities around the world, passing by the Barbican in London, the Pacco da Musica in Rome among others.

In the Universal Exposition of Dubai in 2022, she also leads the concert "The beauty will save the world" with Cartier Women's Initiative as part of the Women's Pavilion at the Universal exhibition in Dubai, bringing a first female conductor, ensemble and a female choir to this country.

In 2022, the Amazonia project was released as a CD under the Alpha label, recorded with the Zürich Philharmonia. This project has been presented by prestigious ensembles, including the Frankfurt Radio Orchestra, the Luxembourg Philharmonie, and the Spanish National Orchestra and Choir, among others.

The Metanoia project won the International Classical Music Documentary Award for Best Performance/Documentary.

In 2023, her Ravel recording with pianist François-Xavier Poizat and the London Philharmonia Orchestra was awarded the Editor’s Choice by Gramophone Magazine. In 2024, Scheherazade, a Tale was nominated for the German Critics’ Prize. In 2025, she commissioned the world premiere of Fazil Say’s piano concerto Mother Earth

In 2023, Simone Menezes was honored as one of the 100 Femmes de Culture.

In 2024, she will launch the Scheherazade – A Tale project as a residency at the Boulez Saal in Paris. This project will include a CD released by the Alpha label and a co-production with Mezzo and Medici.tv. It features Golshifteh Farahani in the role of Scheherazade, with the text co-constructed by Simone Menezes, Simon Scardfield, and Lynn Sefarty. Additionally, in 2024, Simone will begin the complete recording of Ravel’s works alongside pianist François-Xavier Poizat.

== Personal life ==
Menezes is married since the age of 20 to the engineer Humberto Menezes and is the mother of Julia Menezes.

== Discography ==
- Novos Universos Sonoros with Orquestra Sinfônica da Unicamp (2009)
- Suíte Contemporânea Brasileira with Camerata Latino Americana (2015)
- Accents with Ensemble K (Aparté; 2020)
- Metanoia - Puccini, Bach, Villa-Lobos, Pärt, Borodin. With Manon Galy, Violine; Ensemble K (Accentus; 2021)
- Amazonia with Zurich Philharmonia and Camila Provenzale - Alpha Label 2023
- Ravel - London Philharmonia and Francois Xavier Poizat - label Aparte 2024
- Sheherazade, a tale - Ensemble K, Golshfiteth Farahani and Kristin Winters - Alpha label 2024
