= Turibio =

Turibio is a given name. Notable people with the name include:

- Turibio Santos (born 1943), Brazilian classical guitarist, musicologist, and composer
- Saint Turibio, born Turibius of Mogrovejo (1538–1606), Spanish missionary Archbishop of Lima
