= Ritual (Fernando Otero album) =

Studio album by Fernando Otero
- Released: 2015
- Recorded: January 2015
- Studio: Gallery Recording Studio
- Genre: Contemporary Classical
- Length: 37:00
- Label: Siderata Records
- Producer: Fernando Otero - Brian Forbes - Ruben Parra

Fernando Otero chronology
Prima Donna (2014)	Ritual (2015)	Enigma (2016)

Ritual is an album by Argentine pianist, vocalist and composer Fernando Otero, recorded in 2015 and released on the Siderata Records label. Ritual brings a collection of new compositions for Orchestra, Voices and Chamber Ensembles. The composer appeared to be working more towards the production of formal classical works which display a significant grounding in the Argentine lyricism–usually associated with Tango–plus elements of classical music and piano improvisation. This work features vocal and violin lines, and full orchestra textures. The album emphasizes melodic and slow tempos, and the bandoneon is present in two of the pieces, driving the listener into an Argentine atmosphere, both timbrical and melodic.

== Reception ==
Otero received two Latin Grammy nominations for Ritual, as "Best Classical Album" and "Best Contemporary Classical Composition", for his composition entitled Conexion.

== Track listing ==
All compositions by Fernando Otero

1. Overture
2. Ceremonia
3. Siderata
4. Fortuna
5. Conexion
6. Cielo Del Suburbio
7. Primeras Luces
8. Memoire

== Personnel ==
- aMBe (Maria Brodskaya) - vocals
- Nick Danielson - violin
- Adam Fisher - violincello
- Patricio Villarejo - violincello
- Brian Forbes - classical guitar
- Ivan Barenboim - soprano, bass, contra-alto clarinet
- Pablo Aslan - double bass
- Bandoneon: Hector Del Curto - bandoneon
- Fernando Otero - Composer
- The New York State Symphony Orchestra
- Brian Forbes - mixing, engineer (at The Gallery Recording Studio)
- Max Ross - engineer (at Systems Two Studio)
- Manuel Valdivia - engineer (at La Casa Post)
- Jim Brick - mastering (at Absolute Audio)
- Gonzalo Pujal Laplagne - cover design
- Luciano Antinori - cover artwork (from the “Humus Cantropus” series)
