= Kristhyan Benitez =

Venezuelan pianist and composer

Kristhyan Benítez
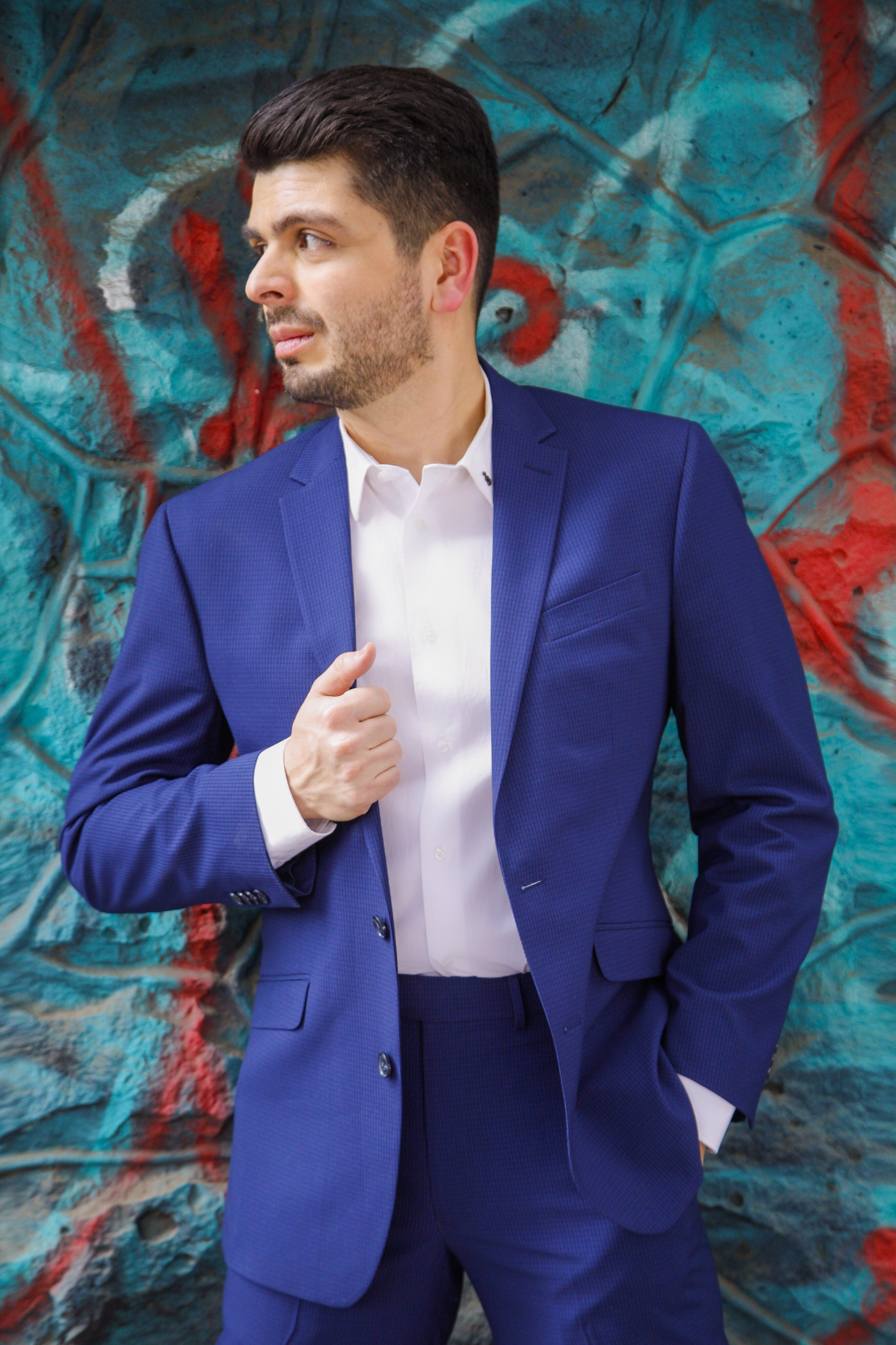
- Kristhyan Benítez Latin Grammy winner picture

Background information
- Origin: Caracas, Venezuela
- Genres: Classical, Latin American music
- Occupations: Pianist, composer, arranger
- Instrument: Piano
- Labels: Steinway & Sons
- Website: kbenitez.com

Kristhyan Benítez is a Venezuelan concert pianist and composer recognized for his performances in classical and Latin American music. His album "Latin American Classics," won Latin Grammy Award for Best Classical Album in 2021. He is a Steinway & Sons artist.

== Early life and education ==
Kristhyan Benítez was born in Caracas, Venezuela. He began his musical studies at the age of four with Olga Lopez, a pupil of Magda Tagliaferro. After three months, he performed for an audience of 2,000 people at the Teresa Carreño Cultural Complex in Caracas. He furthered his education with mentors such as Solomon Mikowsky, Philippe Entremont, Michael Lewin, and Frank Fernández.

José Antonio Abreu, founder of El Sistema, described Benítez as "one of the most important and brilliant leaders of the Musical Movement in Venezuela and the whole Continent." His conservatory education in Venezuela included a focus on works by Latin American and Venezuelan composers, which influenced his later career.

== Career ==
Benítez's career includes performances across Europe, Asia, and the Americas. He has collaborated with conductors like Claudio Abbado, Gustavo Dudamel, Alondra de la Parra, among others. In 2021, Benítez won the Latin Grammy for Best Classical Album for his recording Latin American Classics. This album showcases compositions from Latin American composers, including works from Cuba, Argentina, Brazil, Venezuela, and Mexico. His 2023 album, "Afro-Cuban Dances," earned him a second Latin Grammy nomination and features compositions by Cuban composer Ernesto Lecuona. Kristhyan served as assistant conductor of the Philharmonic Orchestra of the Americas (POA) in 2005.

Kristhyan Benítez is an exclusive Steinway & Sons artist. He has performed in venues such as Philharmonie Hall (Berlin), Davies Symphony Hall (San Francisco), Lincoln Center (New York), National Center for the Performing Arts in Beijing, Ehrbar Saal in Vienna, Salle Cortot in Paris, and Palacio de Bellas Artes (Mexico City). Beyond his performance career, Benítez is dedicated to teaching and promoting Latin American music. He actively participates in educational programs, aiming to expand the classical repertoire and inspire new generations of musicians.

His work as a composer and arranger often manifests in his improvisations and transcriptions featured on his albums, such as his improvisation on Ernesto Lecuona's "Ahí Viene el Chino" and his piano transcription of Ernestina Lecuona's song "Ahora que eres mío," both featured on his album Afro-Cuban Dances.

== Collaborations ==
Benítez has collaborated with several acclaimed artists throughout his career, including Oscar-winning composer Gustavo Santaolalla and the neotango group Bajofondo. He has also worked with Venezuelan pianist Vanessa Pérez on the two-piano program A fuego lento, which combines traditional repertoire with new Latin American arrangements. The program premiered in June 2023 at the Sounds of Oradea Festival in Romania.

== Chamber music ==
In addition to his solo career, Benítez is an active chamber musician, performing in various ensembles and collaborations that highlight his versatility and engagement with different musical genres.

=== BENITEZ ===
In addition to his classical music career, Benítez explores new creative territories through his alter-ego project, BENITEZ. Under this moniker, he expands his artistic universe by composing, producing, and arranging music in genres beyond classical, including Latin, electronic, funk, and jazz. This project showcases his versatility and passion for blending diverse musical styles, allowing him to reach a broader audience while maintaining his signature artistic depth. In August 2025, Billboard named him one of their “On the Radar: Latin Emerging Artists to Discover,” highlighting the growing impact of the BENITEZ project.Exposito, Suzy (2025-08-01). "On the Radar: Latin Emerging Artists to Discover in August 2025". Billboard. Billboard Media, LLC.

== Musical style ==
Benítez is known for his fusion of classical tradition with Latin American rhythms and melodies, creating a distinctive sound that resonates with diverse audiences. His work bridges the gap between classical European compositions and the folkloric traditions of Latin America.

== Discography ==
Benítez has released several albums that highlight his unique blend of classical and Latin American music. His notable works include:

- Beethoven: Latin American Soloists (2001) - His very first album, recorded with the Berlin Symphoniker, featuring one of Beethoven’s most beloved piano concertos (Op.19) and piano sonata Les Adieux.
- Latin American Classics (2021) - Winner of the Latin Grammy for Best Classical Album, featuring compositions from Cuba, Argentina, Brazil, Venezuela, and Mexico.
- Afro-Cuban Dances (2023) - Nominated to a Latin Grammy for Best Classical Album, a tribute to Ernesto Lecuona's Legacy, mestizaje and folk music traditions.
- Miniatures (2016) - Showcasing a diverse selection of Latin American and Classical composers in a Live performance.
- Nosotros (2020) - Homage to classical, folk, and pop music from Venezuela, bringing every track into a classical music approach and inviting different artists to create a perfect blend.
- Latin American Classics, Vol. 2 (2025) – Released on August 1, 2025 by Steinway & Sons (catalog number STNS 30251). A continuation of his mission to explore Latin American piano repertoire with works from Venezuela, Cuba, Argentina, Chile, Colombia, Mexico, and Brazil.

He has also released several singles, including "Desesperanza" (2018), "Te Extraño" (2022), "Todavía" (feat. Raquel Sofía) (2022), and "Venezuela" (2024).

== Awards and recognition ==
- Latin Grammy Award for Best Classical Album: 2021, for Latin American Classics.
- Jose Felix Ribas Award: 1998, presented by the President of Venezuela for his cultural contributions.
- Global Music Awards: Bronze Medal for the album Miniatures.

== Personal life ==
Benítez is married to Venezuelan writer and journalist Juan Pablo Fernández-Feo.
