= Débora Halász =

Brazilian musician

Débora Halász is a Brazilian classical pianist and harpsichordist.

== Biography and career ==
Halász was born in Brazil, and studied in São Paulo at the Magdalena Tagliaferro Academy, and later with Beatriz Balzi and Myrian Dauelsberg. She also studied law at São Paulo University. Halász made her debut with the São Paulo State Symphony Orchestra when she was fifteen. At age nineteen, she was awarded the Critics' Prize (APCA) for best soloist of the year, in Rachmaninov's third piano concerto.

Halász has performed around the world, in Europe, South America and North America, playing works for solo piano, chamber works, and performing in the Duo Halász, which she founded in 1993 with her husband Franz Halász. She has recorded a number of CDs for the BIS and Naxos labels, notably a series of complete piano music by Villa-Lobos, and works by Seixas and Carulli.

Débora Halász teaches at the Nuremberg State Musikhochschule and at the Hochschule für Musik und Theater, Munich. In 2015, her album Alma Brasileira, a partnership with Johannes Müller, was nominated for the 16th Latin Grammy Awards in the Best Classical Album category.
