= Eugenio Toussaint =

Mexican musician

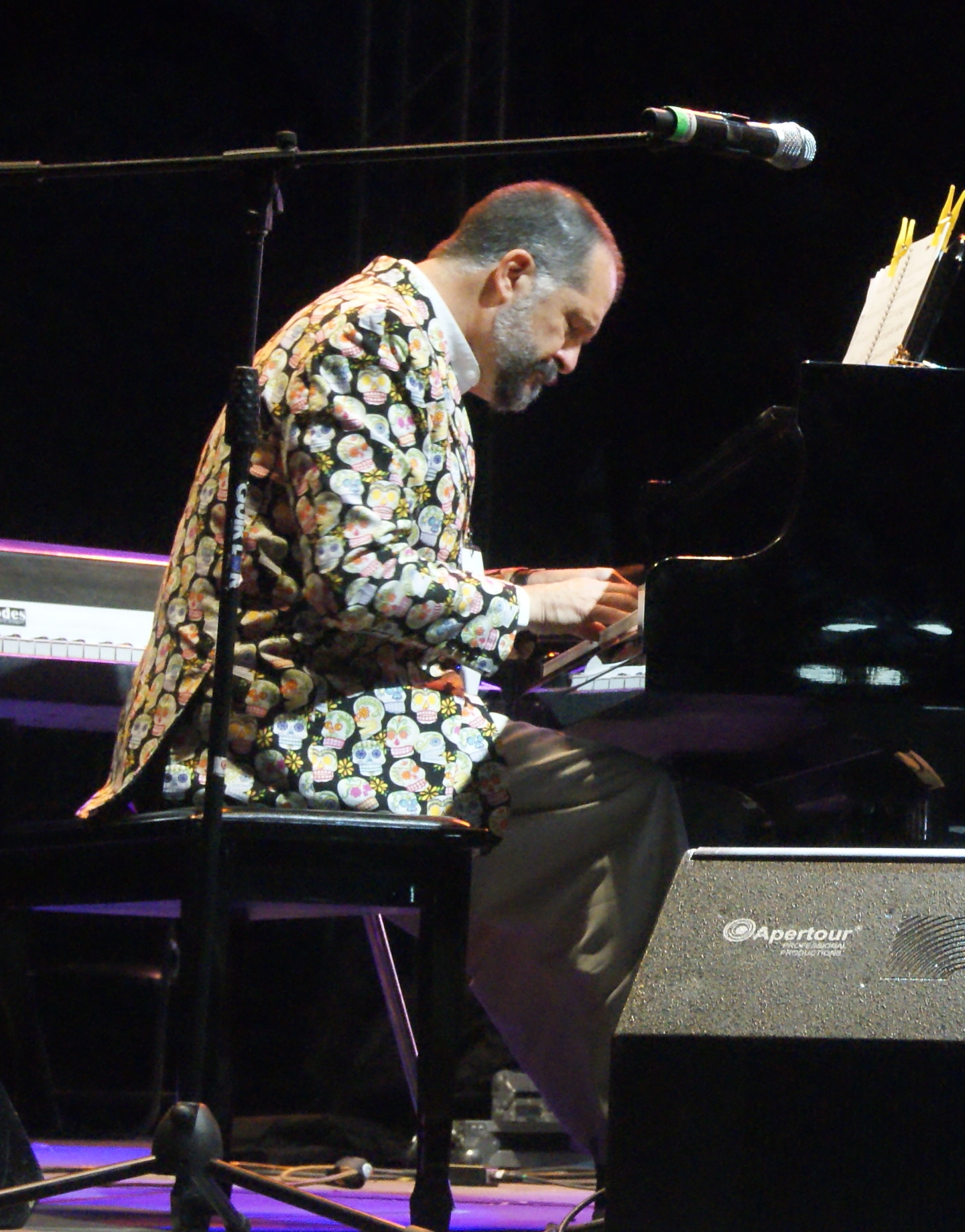
Editing Eugenio Toussaint

Eugenio Toussaint Uhtohff (October 9, 1954 – February 8, 2011) was a Mexican composer, arranger and jazz musician.

Eugenio died from an antidepressant's overdose on February 8, 2011 in Mexico City.
