= Turibio Santos =

- Born: Turibio Soares Santos; March 7, 1943 (age 83)
- Origin: São Luís, Maranhão, Brazil
- Occupation: Guitarist
- Instrument: Guitar
- Years active: 1962–
- Website: www.turibio.com.br

Turibio Soares Santos (born March 7, 1943) is a Brazilian classical guitarist, musicologist, and composer, who established himself as a performer with a wide repertoire of pieces by Heitor Villa-Lobos, Ernesto Nazareth, Francisco Mignone, and by accompanying musicians like Clara Sverner, Paulo Moura and Olivia Byington on many CDs.

== Life and career ==
Turibio Santos was born in São Luís, Maranhão, and at the age of 10 was attracted to the classical guitar. His first teacher was Antonio Rebello (Heck 2001), and later he studied with Oscar Càceres. He also studied composition with Edino Krieger (Heck 2001). In 1962, he gave his first recital in Rio de Janeiro, followed by a series of concerts all over Brazil. In the following year, the Villa-Lobos Museum invited him to play the Brazilian composer's Twelve Etudes for guitar and the Mystic Sextet, given its first public hearing. 1964 marked the formation of a duo with Oscar Càceres and several tours of South America. Turibio Santos decided to establish himself in Europe in 1965, in which year he won the first prize in the O.R.T.F.’s International Guitar Competition in Paris.

His appearances in programmes on the ORTF and the BBC as well as his world première recording on disc of Heitor Villa-Lobos's “Twelve Studies” have made him known to the European public.

Many orchestras have welcomed him as a soloist, such as the Monte-Carlo Philharmonic Orchestra, l’Orchestre Philharmonique de Radio France, the English Chamber Orchestra and the Royal Philharmonic Orchestra. In 1974, he joined Yehudi Menuhin and Mstislav Rostropovich in the opening Concert for the Creation of International Funds for Musical Collaboration organised by UNESCO.

Turibio Santos has been professor of classical guitar at UFRJ School of Music for 24 years, and director of the Museu Villa-Lobos in Rio de Janeiro since 1985 (Heck 2001).
