= Vital (Fernando Otero album) =

Studio album by Fernando Otero
- Released: 2010
- Recorded: May 2009
- Studio: Legacy Studios in New York
- Genre: Contemporary Classical
- Length: 35:43
- Label: Harmonia Mundi
- Producer: Fernando Otero

Fernando Otero chronology
Material (2009)	Vital (2010)	Romance (2013)

Vital is an album by Argentine pianist, vocalist and composer Fernando Otero, recorded in 2008 and released on the Harmonia Mundi's World Village label.

== Reception ==
In 2010 Fernando Otero received the Latin Grammy Award for Best Classical Album for Vital.

== Track listing ==
All compositions by Fernando Otero.

1. Nocturno - 2:09
2. Aguaribay - 3:32
3. Globalizacion - 2:23
4. Siderata - 4:05
5. La Abundancia - 4:00
6. Danza Preludio 22 - 0:55
7. Danza - 1:32
8. Reforma Mental - 2:45
9. La Casa Vacia - 6:20
10. Noche Iluminada - 3:21
11. Fin De Revision - 4:41

== Personnel ==
- Luciano Antinori – photography
- Jeff Bush – trombone
- Chris Colbourn - booking
- Nick Danielson – violin
- Hector del Curto – bandoneon
- Norberto Di Bella – drums
- Scarlett Freund – design
- Pedro Giraudo – acoustic bass
- René Goiffon – executive producer
- Ryan Keberle – trombone
- Gonzalo Pujal Laplagne – photography
- Luis Nacht – tenor saxophone
- Fernando Otero – arranger, piano, producer
- Eduardo Percossi – classical guitar
- Jonathan Powell – trumpet
- Inbal Segev – cello
- Tom Swift – mastering, mixing, recording
- Manuel Valdivia – project coordinator
- Patricio Villarejo – cello
