= Fernando Otero =

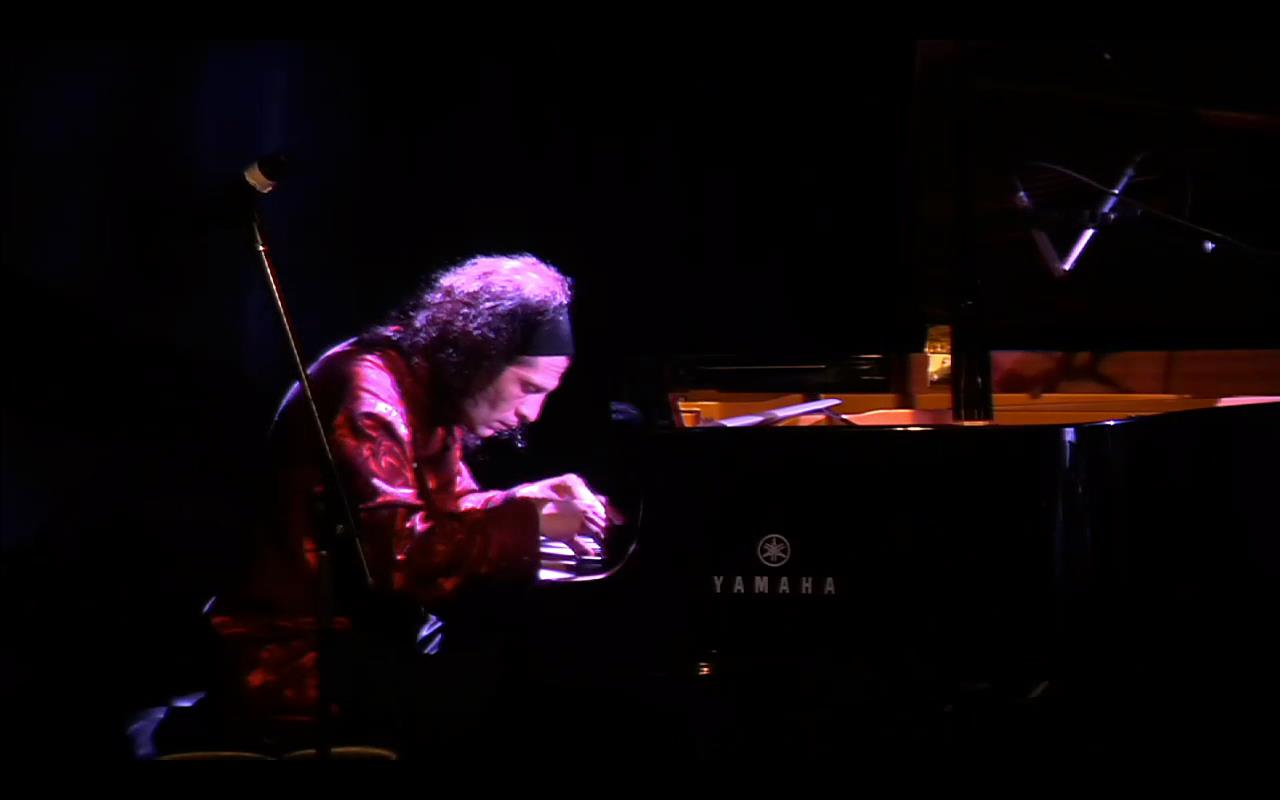
- Otero performing in 2012

Background information
- Born: Fernando Martin Otero; Buenos Aires, Argentina
- Genres: Classical, contemporary classical, tango, Latin jazz, jazz
- Occupations: Musician, vocalist, composer
- Instruments: Piano, vocals, electric bass, accordion, melodica, guitar
- Label: Warner Bros. Nonesuch Harmonia Mundi
- Website: www.fernandootero.com

Fernando Otero is an Argentine pianist, vocalist, multi-instrumentalist and composer.

His first contact with music was receiving vocal lessons from his mother, Elsa Marval, an internationally acclaimed singer and actress. He started taking piano lessons at five. He also studied the guitar, electric bass, drums, accordion, and melodica, instruments he plays occasionally. A classically trained and virtuoso pianist, Otero studied classical music since childhood. He has since developed his own style which has elements of jazz, tango, and contemporary classical music.

== Biography ==
Otero found his voice as writer, musician, and bandleader when, at the urging of one of his music teachers, he began to incorporate the indigenous sounds of his native Buenos Aires into his work, as he did in his Nonesuch debut, Pagina de Buenos Aires in 2008.

He has been described by many critics as a classically trained virtuoso pianist and composer who developed his own style by blending elements of classical contemporary music and improvisation while acknowledging tango as a starting point.

Shortly after moving to the U.S. in the 1990s, he worked with correspondingly diverse collaborators, including Paquito D'Rivera, the Kronos Quartet, Quincy Jones, Eddie Gómez, flautist Dave Valentin and pianist/film composer Dave Grusin. He played with Arturo O'Farrill's Jazz Orchestra at Symphony Space, Lincoln Center and during their Sunday night residency at New York City's Birdland, performing his compositions with this large jazz ensemble also at Lincoln Center and Symphony Space. He also performed with clarinetist Paquito D'Rivera on stage, at Birdland, Blue Note, the Caramoor Festival and in the recording studio. He joined the Paquito D'Rivera Quintet for the recording of Funk Tango, which includes Otero's composition Milonga 10. For Funk Tango, The Paquito D'Rivera Quintet received in 2008 the Grammy Award for Best Latin Jazz Album.

He has received commissions from performers and institutions worldwide and has written music for orchestra, chamber ensembles, string quartet and choir, as well as for solo instruments including piano, violin and cello. Many of his compositions were commissioned by the New York State Council on the Arts, Lincoln Center, Laguna Beach Festival (featuring Otero as composer-in-residence), St. Ursanne International Piano Festival in Switzerland, and by performers such as the Kronos Quartet, the Imani Winds ensemble, Arturo O'Farrill, Inbal Segev, and Jason Vieaux.

== Musical career ==
In January 2008, Otero released the album Pagina de Buenos Aires from Nonesuch Records. Critics describe the album as "[u]rbane and exotic, surreal and streetwise, and alive with invention and emotion".

In February 2008, the Kronos Quartet premiered "El Cerezo" ("The Cherry Tree") at Carnegie Hall, a one-movement work for string quartet commissioned from Otero that "blended tango-infused lyrical interludes into a sometimes dissonant canvas."

In 2010, he received the Latin Grammy Award for Best Classical Album for Vital. In 2015 he was nominated for the Latin Grammy Award for "Best Classical Album" and for "Best Classical Contemporary Composition" for his album Ritual.

Otero's album Romance (Soundbrush Records) was released in 2013 and has been described as "an exhilarating surprise - a collection of beautifully crafted short pieces that are both jazzy and lyrical, brought to life by a superb ensemble of instrumentalists and singers".

In 2014, he released the album entitled Prima Donna, an intimate celebration of the artistic career of Elsa Marval, Otero's mother and musical mentor. Elsa Marval was an internationally acclaimed opera singer, composer, pianist and actress, who died in 2010. Prima Donna features pieces for solo piano, showing Otero's song-like melodic approach and his use of a wide palette of pianistic colors, and also his rhythmical side when performing fast tempo pieces, playing notes repeated with piston-like precision with sudden detours into more impressionistic textures. A rendition of "El Portenito", a piece written by Argentine composer Angel Villoldo gives us an idea of how Otero can cover well-known compositions in order to expose his personal view of them. The album also includes orchestral and chamber music pieces plus a sonata for Solo Violin in one-movement using a wide palette of violin techniques, which Otero wrote for long-time collaborator Nick Danielson. In Prima Donna, Otero ratchets up the contemporary classical music elements that were already evident on his Warner Music album entitled Pagina de Buenos Aires (Nonesuch). The last piece in the recording is a rendition of Quincy Jones' composition "The Pawnbroker" arranged by Otero.

The arrangement showcases Quincy Jones's melodic style combined with Otero's orchestral technique and pianistic language. The album was produced by Ruben Parra and recorded in New York and Los Angeles.

Otero released Ritual in 2015, bringing a collection of new compositions for Orchestra, Voices Chamber Ensembles, and Solo Piano. The composer appeared to be working more towards the production of formal classical works which display a significant grounding in Argentine lyricism, usually associated with tango, plus elements of classical music and piano improvisation. This work features vocal and violin lines, full orchestra textures, and Otero's pianism. The album emphasizes melodic and slow tempos and the bandoneon is present in two of the pieces, driving the listener into an Argentine atmosphere, both timbrical and melodic. Otero received two Latin Grammy nominations for Ritual as Best Classical Album and Best Contemporary Classical Composition for his composition entitled "Conexion".

In 2016, Otero put out another studio work entitled Enigma and was nominated for Best Classical Contemporary Composition for his piece "Jardin Del Adios". His album, Solo Buenos Aires came out in April 2017, in which Otero reconnects with the song form as vocalist, multi-instrumentalist, and arranger, comprising a collection of songs written during the first half of the 20th century in Buenos Aires, with arrangements for orchestra. This album won the Best Tango Album award at the 18th Latin Grammy Awards. Vox is the title of Otero's album released in 2018 along with long-time collaborator, violinist Nick Danielson. It contains music for solo piano, solo violin, and violin-piano duet. In this work, Otero's compositions reflect once again his style in terms of melodic, harmonic, and rhythmical language, while the pianism exposes the need for technical proficiency. Many of his compositions require alternating left- and right-hand notes and chords, similar to a paradiddle, creating patterns with two or more melodies complementing each other. In 2019 he released the album Astrantia, featuring Varijashree Venugopal, Waldo Madera, Guillermo Vadalá and Brian Forbes. A new collection of originals that embodies musical language explorations, classical lyricism, and improvisation, expanded in electric soundscapes. Also in 2019, the woodwind quintet "Quintet of The Americas"commissioned and premiered Otero's composition named Anemona. Otero's Cello Concerto written for Inbal Segev was recorded (later released by Avie Records) by Inbal Segev and Brooklyn Rider, in New York City. Released by Siderata Records on 2021, Otero's album "Can You Hear The Flowers" contains seven pieces for solo violin and one for piano. The violin pieces are performed by violinist Elmira Darvarova, and Otero presents a collection of works offering new explorations in his own language as a composer.

Alongside his work as a soloist, his orchestration work has led him to be commissioned to write symphonic and chamber arrangements for Latin American artists such as Mercedes Sosa, Ricardo Arjona, and Alberto Cortez. His contribution to these projects has been strictly through composition, arrangements, and studio direction, providing a sonic identity to albums that these artists later performed on stage incorporating Otero's orchestrations.

Otero has been named a Yamaha Artist by Yamaha Artist Services of New York and has joined their roster of Contemporary Piano Artists. Otero said about his designation, "For decades Yamaha has been innovating in the construction of highly refined pianos with a strongly distinctive sound, which has inspired and motivated me in the search of new levels of musical creativity." Bonnie Barrett, Director of Yamaha Artist Services, Inc., said, "We're thrilled to welcome a pianist whose voice represents such a unique intersection of classical and contemporary music, all informed by his Argentine roots. Fernando is a thoughtful innovator and an extraordinary musician, and we look forward to years of fruitful collaboration."

== Musical style ==
Otero's music has been described to "vibrantly [summon] tango ancestors while also acknowledging Béla Bartók and Sergei Prokofiev", and his playing style has been described to "bore traces of jazz pianists like Bill Evans and Don Pullen. The resulting synthesis proposed bold new directions for a venerable tradition."

Neely Bruce, Professor of Music at Wesleyan, when describing Otero's music, says, "It's exciting, it's full of variety, it's very dramatic, very rhythmically complex; it sounds like tango on steroids."

Otero's study of drums becomes evident in pieces like Preludio 4, described as "a whirlwind piano solo that showcases Otero's formidable keyboard prowess. (The earlier Pagina de Buenos Aires album featured his Preludio 19)."

=== Latin Grammy Awards ===
The Latin Grammy Awards are awarded annually by the Latin Recording Academy. The Recording Academy established in 1997 the Latin Recording Academy as a Latin counterpart to expand its operation in Latin America and Spain

Year	Category	Nominated work	Result
2010	Best Classical Album	Vital	Won
2015	Best Classical Album	Ritual	Nominated
2015	"Best Contemporary Classical Composition)"	"Conexion"	Nominated
2016	"Best Contemporary Classical Composition)"	"Jardin Del Adios"	Nominated
2017	Best Tango Album	Solo Buenos Aires	Won

== Discography ==
- Fernando Otero (Siderata Records, 1997)
- Chamber Music (2000)
- Siderata (2001)
- Plan (2003)
- Revision (2005)
- Pagina de Buenos Aires (Nonesuch, 2007)
- Expansion
- Material (Warner Bros. 2009)
- Vital (World Village, 2010)
- Romance (Soundbrush, 2013)
- Prima Donna (Siderata Records, 2014)
- Ritual (Siderata Records, 2015)
- Enigma (Siderata Records, 2016)
- Solo Buenos Aires (RYCY, 2017)
- Vox (Siderata Records, 2018)
- Astrantia (Siderata Records, 2019)
- Can You Hear The Flowers (Siderata Records, 2021)
- Ideal (Siderata Records, 2025)
