= Jaramar =

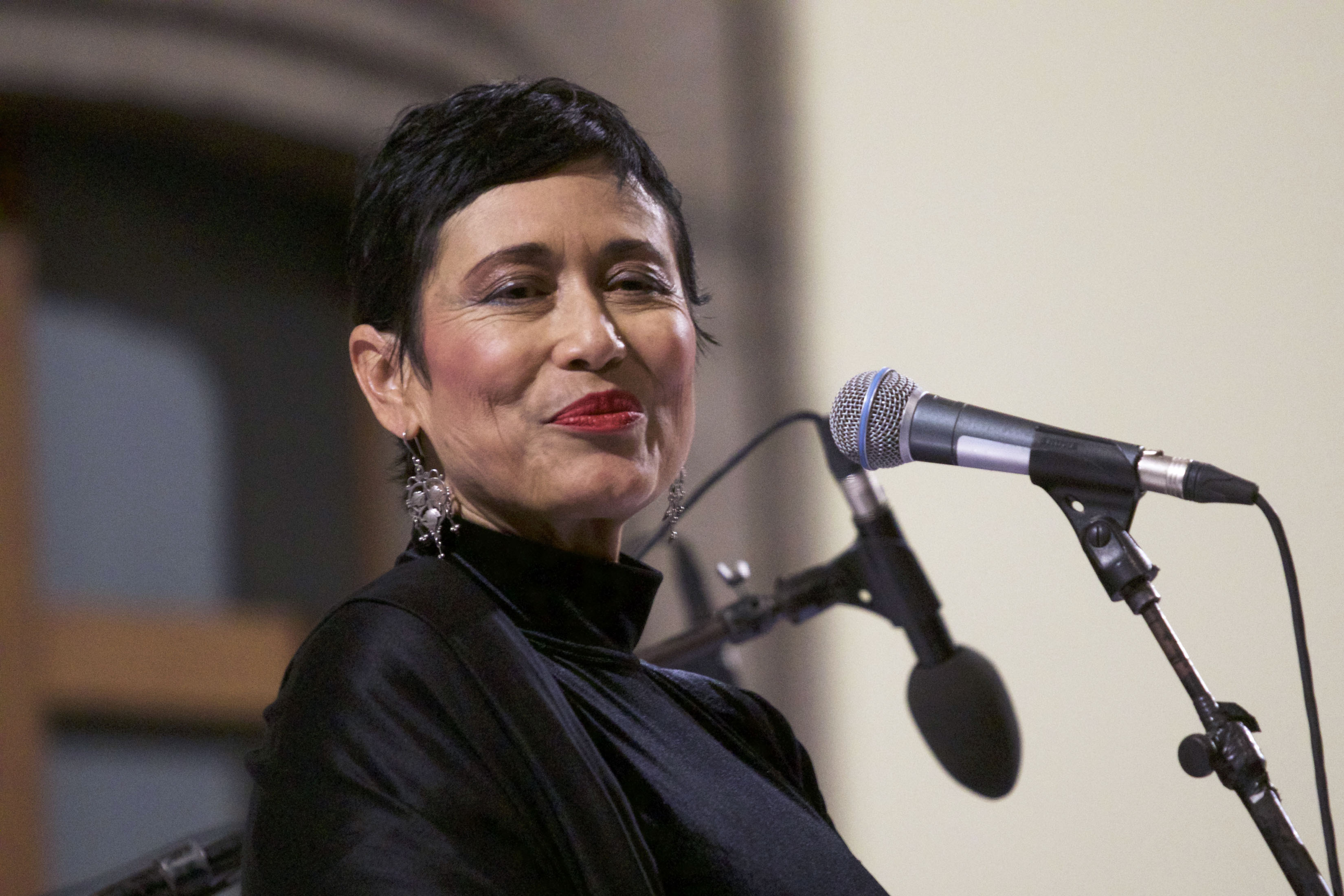
- Masters of World Music

Background information
- Born: August 3, 1954 (age 71)
- Origin: Mexico City, Mexico
- Genres: World Music
- Labels: Intolerancia
- Website: Web Page

Jaramar Soto is a Mexican traditional singer, songwriter and painter.

== Biography ==
From the age of 10 years Jaramar studied singing with various music teachers, and in 1966 entered the Mexican–American Cultural Exchange Institute in San Antonio, Texas. On her return to Mexico she entered the Mexican Academy of Dance, and also studied dance at the Academy of Coyoacán. Between 1972 and 1976, she studied Textile and Apparel Design in Rome at the Academia di Costume e di Moda and in Paris at the Ecole de la Chambre Syndicale of Couture Parisienne.

Since her return to Mexico, and until 1983, she worked in the area of clothing and textile design. Her professional activity is divided between her performance as a singer and her ongoing work in drawing, painting and sculpture.

Since 1978 she has lived in the city of Guadalajara. In 1990 she started a research project, recreation and music search which has been presented in different forums by Mexico and Europe.

== Discography ==
- 1992 Entre la pena y el gozo
- 1995 Fingir que duermo
- 1997 Si yo nunca muriera
- 1998 Lenguas
- 1999 A flor de tierra
- 2002 Nadie creera en incendio
- 2002 Journey (1992–2002)
- 2004 Duerme por la noche oscura
- 2006 Que mis labios te nombren
- 2008 Diluvio
- 2010 Ruta de viaje hacia un diluvio (DVD)
- 2011 Fiestas privadas
- 2013 Rosa de los vientos (compilation)
- 2015 El hilo invisible, cantos sefaradíes, con el Cuarteto Latinoamericano (*Latin Grammy winner 2016, for best music classical album
- 2015 Wait for the rain, con su trio de jazz Caída Libre
- 2017 Sueños
