= Manuel Barrueco =

Cuban musician

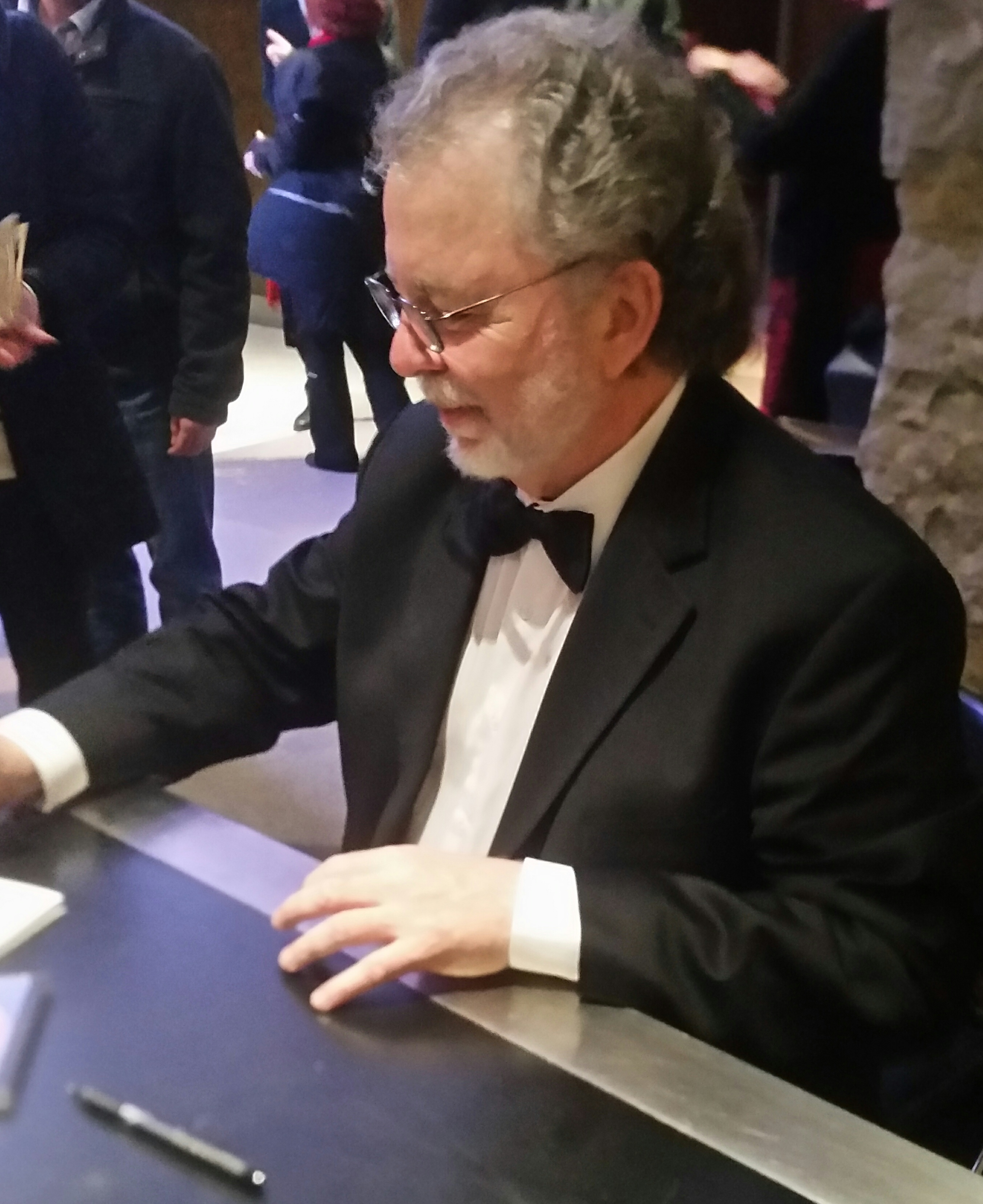
Manuel Barrueco photographed in Montréal, Québec, Canada inside the MBAM Bourgie Hall.

Manuel Barrueco (born December 16, 1952) is a Cuban classical guitarist resident in the United States.

== Biography ==
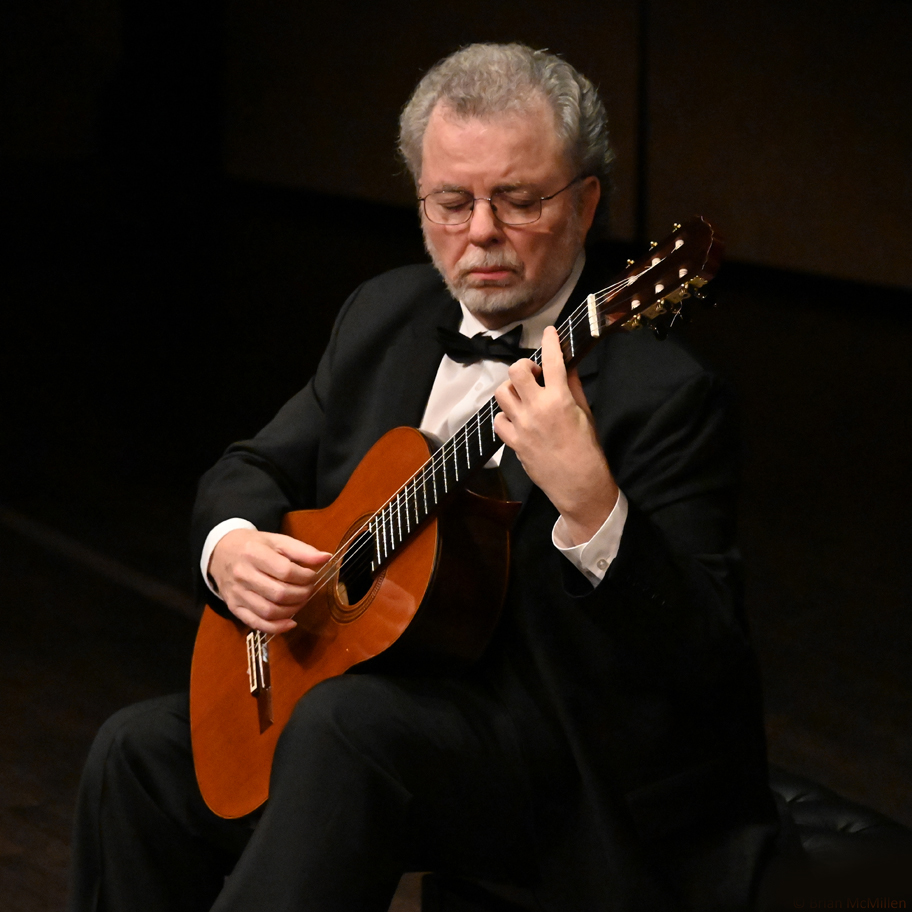

Born in Santiago de Cuba, Barrueco began playing the guitar at the age of eight. Following the 1959 Cuban revolution, Barrueco's father withdrew his son from the state schools, and obtained private at-home education for his three children, Manuel and his sisters Miriam and Lucia. Barrueco subsequently attended the Esteban Salas Conservatory for music studies. In 1967, Barrueco and his family emigrated to the United States as political refugees. Initially resident in Miami, Florida, Barrueco continued his guitar studies in Miami with Juan Mercadal. The family then moved to Newark, New Jersey, where Barrueco continued his guitar studies with Rey de la Torre.

Barrueco made his Carnegie Hall recital debut in 1974. He joined the faculty of the Manhattan School of Music in 1974. He graduated from the Peabody Conservatory of Music with a Bachelor of Music degree in 1975. Barrueco joined the faculty of the Peabody Conservatory in 1990.

Barrueco has made several recordings for EMI, including his 2006 album, ¡Cuba!. In the 2000s, Barrueco started his own record label, Tonar. His performances have been broadcast by television stations such as NHK in Japan, Bayerischer Rundfunk in Germany, and RTVE in Spain. In the United States, he has been featured in a Lexus car commercial, on CBS Sunday Morning, A&E's Breakfast with the Arts, and Mister Rogers' Neighborhood. A one-hour documentary portrait, Manuel Barrueco: A Gift and a Life, was produced in 2006. It includes several performances and interviews, in one of which he reminisces over his childhood years in Cuba, and pledges never to return until the present communist regime has come to an end. In 2012, Barrueco was named a Fontanals Fellow of United States Artists.

Barrueco has been married twice. His second wife, Asgerdur Sigurdardottir, manages the Tonar label and Barrueco's business matters.

== See also ==
- Classical guitar in Cuba
