= Sonia Rubinsky =

Brazilian classical pianist

Sonia Rubinsky is a Brazilian classical pianist.

== Early years and education ==
Born in Campinas to a Polish mother and a Lithuanian father, Rubinsky lived in Brazil for the first thirteen years of her life; she later lived in Israel for seven years, then moved to New York. She gave her first concert when she was six years old, gave her first performance as soloist with orchestra when she was twelve, and performed for Arthur Rubinstein when she was sixteen. Rubinsky studied with Vlado Perlemuter, Beveridge Webster, Jacob Lateiner, Olga Normanha and William Daghlian, and graduated from the Juilliard School with a Doctor of Arts degree.

== Career ==
Rubinsky has performed as a soloist or with orchestras in North America, Europe, Israel and South America. She performs regularly in Brazil, notably with the Orchestra of the Theatro Municipal of Rio de Janeiro and of São Paulo, the Brazilian Symphony Orchestra, the Campinas Symphony, and the São Paulo State Symphony. She has received the prestigious William Petschek Award as well as a "Best Recitalist of the Year" award from the São Paulo Association of Music Critics. She won the Carlos Gomes Prize as Pianist of the Year in 2006, and won a Latin Grammy Award, in 2009, for Best Recording of the Year for the 8th disc in a series of complete piano works of Heitor Villa-Lobos, on the Naxos label.

Rubinsky has recorded the complete piano works of Heitor Villa-Lobos for the Naxos label. She has also recorded music by John Adams, Debussy, Mozart and others for the Nonesuch/Elektra, Daghlian, Albany Records and Algol Editora labels.
