= Clara Sverner =

Brazilian pianist

Clara Sverner (August 29, 1936) is a Brazilian pianist, who has had classical education.

== History ==
Born in São Paulo, Clara Sverner's interpretations are well considered by public and critics from Brazil and abroad. She had a sound education, started in São Paulo with José Kliass, that in turn studied in Berlin with Martin Krause, a Liszt pupil. She got her master's with Louis Hildebrand, at Conservatory of Geneve, where she has got a Gold Medal. She did improvement studies with Leonard Shure, an assistant to Artur Schnabel, and then at the Mannes College of Music, in New York City. While still a teenager, she won the International Wilhelm Backhaus Competition, starting a career that made her one of the most prestigious Brazilian virtuosi.

Ms. Sverner participated in recitals and concerts all over Brazil, and toured in Europe, the United States, Japan and Israel. Her programmes usually feature a repertoire that includes pieces from the old English virginalists of the 16th century, to the major composers of 20th century. She highlights, most of all, the aesthetic quality, the boldness of invention and the expressive power of the pieces she performs. As such, Clara Sverner is a nonconformist artist, who never tires of enhancing, researching and daring. In the context of Brazilian classical music, she was responsible more than anyone else for the revival of the popularity of the works of Glauco Velásquez, a Brazilian classical composer of the 20th century.

Clara Sverner recorded several pieces for piano by Chiquinha Gonzaga, and thus was responsible for attracting the attention of the public to her works. Ms Sverner's fruitful partnership with the Brazilian instrumentalist Paulo Moura was opened up to several musical universes, exploring works from the Brazilian popular music (like Pixinguinha), to contemporary classical composers like Almeida Prado, Gilberto Mendes, and Ronaldo Miranda, that created pieces specifically for the Sverner and Moura duo.

Ms. Sverner's discography has 25 records, available worldwide, and reflects her sense of aesthetics and her esprit d'avant garde.
