= List of compositions by Darius Milhaud =

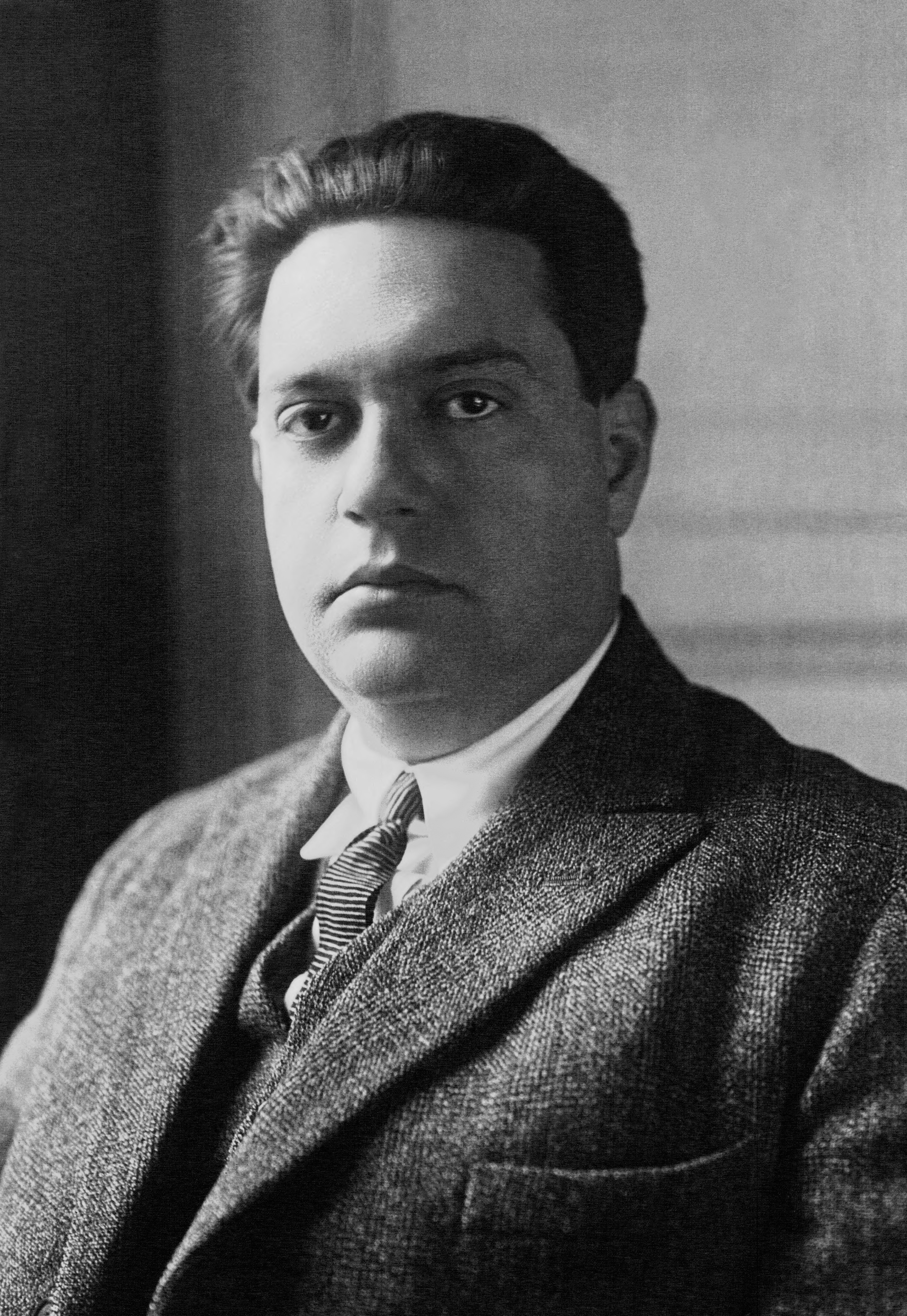
Darius Milhaud in 1923.

Below is a list of compositions by Darius Milhaud sorted by category.

== Operas ==
- La brebis égarée, Op. 4 (1910–1914); 3 acts, 20 scenes; libretto by Francis Jammes; premiere 1923
- Les euménides, Op. 41 (1917–1923); L'Orestie d'Eschyle (Orestiean Trilogy No. 3); 3 acts; libretto by Paul Claudel after Aeschylus
- Les malheurs d'Orphée, Op. 85 (1924); chamber opera in 3 acts; libretto by Armand Lunel; premiere 1926
- Esther de Carpentras, Op. 89 (1925–1926); opera buffa in 2 acts; libretto by Armand Lunel; premiere 1937
- Le pauvre matelot, Op. 92 (1926); 'complainte' in 3 acts; libretto by Jean Cocteau; premiere 1927
- 3 Opéras-minutes
  1. L'enlèvement d'Europe, Op. 94 (1927); 1 act, 8 scenes; libretto by Henri Hoppenot
  2. L'abandon d'Ariane, Op. 98 (1927); 1 act, 5 scenes; libretto by Henri Hoppenot
  3. La délivrance de Thésée, Op. 99 (1927); 1 act, 6 scenes; libretto by Henri Hoppenot
- Christophe Colomb, Op. 102 (1928, revised 1968); 2 parts, 27 scenes; libretto by Paul Claudel
- Maximilien, Op. 110 (1930); historic opera in 3 acts, 9 scenes; libretto by R.S. Hoffman after "Juarez et Maximilien" by Franz Werfel; premiere 1932
- L'opéra du gueux, Op. 171 (1937); ballad opera in 3 acts; libretto by Henri Fluchère after John Gay's The Beggar's Opera (1728)
- Médée, Op. 191 (1938); 1 act, 3 scenes; libretto by Madeleine Milhaud (his cousin and wife); premiere 1939
- Bolivar, Op. 236 (1943); 3 acts, 11 scenes; libretto by Madeleine Milhaud after Jules Supervielle
- David, Op. 320 (1952–1953); 2 parts, 5 acts; libretto by Armand Lunel; concert performance in Jerusalem in 1954; staged at La Scala in 1955
- Fiesta, Op. 370 (1958); 1 act; libretto by Boris Vian
- La mère coupable, Op. 412 (1964–1965); 3 acts; libretto by Madeleine Milhaud after Beaumarchais' play; premiere 1966
- Saint-Louis, roi de France, Op. 434 (1970); opera-oratorio in 2 parts; libretto by Henri Daublier and Paul Claudel; premiere 1972

== Ballets ==
- L'homme et son désir, Op. 48 (1918), for four wordless singers, solo wind, percussion and strings; scenario by Paul Claudel
- Le bœuf sur le toit, Op. 58 (1919); scenario by Jean Cocteau
- Les mariés de la tour Eiffel: Marche nuptiale and Fugue du massacre only, Op. 70 (1921, revised 1971); ballet-show; scenario by Jean Cocteau
- La création du monde, Op. 81a (1923); for small orchestra; scenario by Blaise Cendrars
- Salade (A. Flament), Op. 83 (1924); ballet chanté in 2 acts; scenario by Albert Flament
- Le Train Bleu, Op. 84 (1924); opérette dansée; scenario by Jean Cocteau
- L'éventail de Jeanne: Polka only, Op. 95 (1927); for a children's ballet to which ten French composers each contributed a dance
- La bien-aimée, Op. 101 (1928); pleyela (player piano) and orchestra after music of Schubert and Liszt; 1 act; scenario by Alexandre Benois
- Les songes, Op. 124 (1933); scenario by André Derain
- Moyen âge fleuri (Suite provençale), Op. 152d (1936)
- Moïse, Op. 219 (1940); ballet symphonique; also for orchestra: Opus Americanum No. 2, Op. 219b
- Jeux de printemps, Op. 243b (1944); after the orchestra work
- Suite française, Op. 254 (1945); original version for band, Op. 248 (1944)
- Les cloches (The Bells), Op. 259 (1946); after the poem by Edgar Allan Poe
- ’Adame Miroir, Op. 283 (1948); for 16 solo instruments; scenario by Jean Genet
- La cueillette des citrons, Op. 298b (1949–1950); intermède provençal
- Vendanges, Op. 317 (1952); scenario by Philippe de Rothschild
- La rose des vents, Op. 367 (1957); scenario by Albert Vidalie
- La branche des oiseaux, Op. 374 (1958–1959); scenario by André Chamson

== Orchestral ==
- Suite symphonique No. 1, Op. 12 (1913–1914); after the opera La brebis égarée, Op. 4 (1910–1914)
- Symphonie de chambre (Little Symphony) No. 1 "Le printemps", Op. 43 (1917)
- Symphonie de chambre (Little Symphony) No. 2 "Pastorale", Op. 49 (1918)
- Suite symphonique No. 2, Op. 57 (1919); after the incidental music Protée, Op. 17 (1913–1919)
- Sérénade en trois parties, Op. 62 (1920–1921)
- Saudades do Brasil, Op. 67b (1920–1921); original for piano
- Symphonie de chambre (Little Symphony) No. 3 "Sérénade", Op. 71 (1921)
- Symphonie de chambre (Little Symphony) No. 4 "Dixtour", Op. 74 (1921)
- Symphonie de chambre (Little Symphony) No. 5 "Dixtuor d'instruments à vent", Op. 75 (1922)
- 3 Rag Caprices, Op. 78 (1922); original for piano
- Symphonie de chambre (Little Symphony) No. 6, Op. 79 (1923)
- 2 Hymnes, Op. 88b (1925)
- Suite provençale, Op. 152c (1936); after the incidental music Bertran de Born
- Le carnaval de Londres, Op. 172 (1937)
- L'oiseau, Op. 181 (1937)
- Cortège funèbre, Op. 202 (1939); from the film score Espoir
- Fanfare, Op. 209 (1939)
- Symphony No. 1, Op. 210 (1939)
- Indicatif et marche pour les bons d'armement, Op. 212 (1940)
- Opus Americanum No. 2, Op. 219b (1940); after the ballet Moïse, Op. 219 (1940)
- Introduction et allegro, Op. 220 (1940); after Couperin: La sultane
- 4 Ésquisses (4 Sketches), Op. 227 (1941); original for piano
- Fanfare de la liberté, Op. 235 (1942)
- Jeux de printemps, Op. 243 (1944); also a ballet
- La muse ménagère, Op. 245 (1945); original for piano
- Symphony No. 2, Op. 247 (1944)
- Le bal martiniquais, Op. 249 (1944); also for 2 pianos
- 7 Danses sur des airs palestiniens, Op. 267 (1946–1947)
- Symphony No. 3 "Te Deum" for chorus and orchestra, Op. 271 (1946)
- Symphony No. 4 "Composée á l'occasion de Centenaire de la Révolution de 1848", Op. 281 (1947)
- Paris, Op. 284 (1948); also for 4 pianos
- Kentuckiana-Divertissement, Op. 287 (1948); also for 2 pianos
- Symphony No. 5, Op. 322 (1953)
- Suite campagnarde, Op. 329 (1953)
- Ouverture méditerranéenne, Op. 330 (1953)
- Symphony No. 6, Op. 343 (1955)
- Symphony No. 7, Op. 344 (1955)
- La couronne de Marguerite (Valse en forme de rondo), Op. 353 (1956; his contribution to Variations sur le nom de Marguerite Long); original for piano
- Le globe-trotter, Op. 358 (1956–1957); original for piano
- Les charmes de la vie (Hommage à Watteau), Op. 360 (1957); original for piano
- Aspen sérénade for chamber orchestra, Op. 361 (1957)
- Symphony No. 8 "Rhodanienne", Op. 362 (1957)
- Symphony No. 9, Op. 380 (1959)
- Symphony No. 10, Op. 382 (1960)
- Symphony No. 11 "Romantique", Op. 384 (1960)
- Les funérailles de Phocion (Hommage à Poussin), Op. 385 (1960)
- Aubade, Op. 387 (1960)
- Symphony No. 12 "Rurale", Op. 390 (1961)
- Ouverture philharmonique, Op. 397 (1962)
- A Frenchman in New York, Op. 399 (1962)
- Meurtre d'un grand chef d'état, Op. 405 (1963); dedicated to John F. Kennedy
- Ode pour les morts des guerres, Op. 406 (1963)
- Music for Boston, Op. 414 (1965)
- Musique pour Prague, Op. 415 (1965)
- Musique pour l'Indiana, Op. 418 (1966)
- Musique pour Lisbonne, Op. 420 (1966)
- Musique pour la Nouvelle-Orléans, Op. 422 (1966)
- Promenade concert, Op. 424 (1967)
- Symphonie pour l'univers claudélien, Op. 427 (1968)
- Musique pour Graz, Op. 429 (1968–1969)
- Suite en G, Op. 431 (1969)
- Musique pour Ars Nova, Op. 432 (1969)
- Musique pour San Francisco, Op. 436 (1971)
- Ode pour Jérusalem, Op. 440 (1972)

String orchestra

- Mills Fanfare, Op. 224 (1941)
- Pensée amicale, Op. 342 (1955)
- Symphoniette, Op. 363 (1957)

Wind ensemble

- Suite française, Op. 248 (1944); also for orchestra; adapted as a ballet, Op. 254 (1945)
  1. Normandie
  2. Bretagne
  3. Île de France
  4. Alsace-Lorraine
  5. Provençe
- 2 Marches pour la libération , Op. 260 (1945–1946)
  1. In memoriam; dedicated to the victims of Pearl Harbor
  2. Gloria victoribus; World War II victory march
- West Point Suite, Op. 313 (1954)
- Musique de théâtre, Op. 334b (1954–1970); after the incidental music Saül, Op. 334
- Fanfare for brass ensemble (4 horns, 3 trumpets, 3 trombones and tuba), Op. 396 (1962)
- Introduction et Marche funèbre

== Concertante ==
Piano

- Poème sur un cantique de Camargue for piano and orchestra, Op. 13 (1913)
- Ballade for piano and orchestra, Op. 61 (1920)
- 5 Études for piano and orchestra, Op. 63 (1920)
- 3 Rag Caprices for piano and small orchestra, Op. 78 (1922); also for piano solo
- Le carnaval d'Aix, Fantasy for piano and orchestra, Op. 83b (1926); after the ballet Salade, Op. 83
- Concerto No. 1 for piano and orchestra, Op. 127 (1933)
- Fantaisie pastorale for piano and orchestra, Op. 188 (1938)
- Concerto No. 2 for piano and orchestra, Op. 225 (1941)
- Concerto No. 1 for 2 pianos and orchestra, Op. 228 (1941)
- Concerto No. 3 for piano and orchestra, Op. 270 (1946)
- Suite concertante for piano and orchestra, Op. 278a (1952); after the Concerto for marimba, vibraphone and orchestra, Op. 278 (1947)
- Concerto No. 4 for piano and orchestra, Op. 295 (1949)
- Suite for 2 pianos and orchestra, Op. 300 (1950)
- Concertino d'automne for 2 pianos and 8 instruments, Op. 309 (1951)
- Concerto No. 5 for piano and orchestra, Op. 346 (1955)
- Concert de chambre for piano and chamber orchestra (wind quintet and string quintet), Op. 389 (1961)
- Concerto No. 2 for 2 pianos and 4 percussionists, Op. 394 (1961)

Violin

- Cinéma fantaisie for violin and chamber orchestra, Op. 58b (1919); also for violin and piano; after Le Bœuf sur le toit
- Concerto No. 1 for violin and orchestra, Op. 93 (1927)
- Concertino de printemps for violin and chamber orchestra, Op. 135 (1934)
- Concerto No. 2 for violin and orchestra, Op. 263 (1946)
- Concerto No. 3 "Concert royal" for violin and orchestra, Op. 373 (1958)
- Music for Boston for violin and chamber orchestra, Op. 414 (1965)

Viola

- Concerto No. 1 for viola and orchestra, Op. 108 (1929)
- Air for viola and orchestra, Op. 242 (1944); after the Viola Sonata No. 1, Op. 240
- Concertino d'été for viola and chamber orchestra, Op. 311 (1951)
- Concerto No. 2 for viola and orchestra, Op. 340 (1954–1955)

Cello

- Concerto No. 1 for cello and orchestra, Op. 136 (1934)
- Concerto No. 2 for cello and orchestra, Op. 255 (1945)
- Suite cisalpine sur des airs populaires piémontais for cello and orchestra, Op. 332 (1954)

Other

- Concerto for percussion and small orchestra, Op. 109 (1929–1930)
- Scaramouche, Suite for alto saxophone and orchestra, Op. 165c (1939), or for clarinet and orchestra, Op. 165d (1941); also for 2 pianos, Op. 165b; after the incidental music Le médécin volant, Op. 165 (1937)
  1. Vif et joyeux
  2. Modéré
  3. Brazileira
- Concerto for flute, violin and orchestra, Op. 197 (1938–1939)
- Concerto for clarinet and orchestra, Op. 230 (1941)
- Suite anglaise for harmonica (or violin) and orchestra, Op. 234 (1942)
- Concerto for marimba, vibraphone and orchestra, Op. 278 (1947)
- L'apothéose de Molière, Suite for harpsichord with flute, oboe, clarinet, bassoon and string orchestra, Op. 286 (1948)
- Concerto for harp and orchestra, Op. 323 (1953)
- Concertino d'hiver for trombone and string orchestra, Op. 327 (1953)
- Concerto for oboe and orchestra, Op. 365 (1957)
- Symphonie concertante for bassoon, horn, trumpet, double bass and orchestra, Op. 376 (1959)
- Concerto for harpsichord and orchestra, Op. 407 (1964)
- Stanford sérénade for oboe solo and 11 instruments, Op. 430 (1969)

== Chamber and instrumental ==
Violin

- Sonata No. 1 for violin and piano, Op. 3 (1911)
- Le printemps for violin and piano, Op. 18 (1914)
- Sonata No. 2 for violin and piano, Op. 40 (1917)
- Cinéma fantaisie for violin and piano, Op. 58b (1919); also for violin and chamber orchestra; after Le bœuf sur le toit
- Impromptu for violin and piano, Op. 91 (1926)
- 3 Caprices de Paganini for violin and piano, Op. 97 (1927)
- Dixième sonate de Baptist Anet in D Major, Op. 144 (1935); free transcription for violin and harpsichord
- Sonatina for 2 violins, Op. 221 (1940)
- Danses de Jacaremirim for violin and piano, Op. 256 (1945); 3 pieces
- Sonata for violin and harpsichord, Op. 257 (1945)
- Duo for 2 violins, Op. 258 (1945)
- Farandoleurs for violin and piano, Op. 262 (1946)
- Sonatina pastorale for violin solo, Op. 383 (1960)

Viola

- 4 Visages for viola and piano, Op. 238 (1943)
- Sonata No. 1 sur des thèmes inédits et anonymes de XVIIIe siècle, for viola and piano, Op. 240 (1944)
- Sonata No. 2 for viola and piano, Op. 244 (1944)
- Élégie for viola and piano, Op. 251 (1945)
- Élégie pour Pierre for viola, timpani and 2 percussionists, Op. 416 (1965)

Cello

- Élégie for cello and piano, Op. 251 (1945)
- Sonata for cello and piano, Op. 377 (1959)

Guitar

- Ségoviana, Op. 366 (1957)

Harp

- Sonata, Op. 437 (1971)

Winds

- Sonatina for flute and piano, Op. 76 (1922)
- Sonatina for clarinet and piano, Op. 100 (1927)
- Exercice musical for pipeau, Op. 134 (1934)
- 2 Ésquisses for clarinet and piano, Op. 227 (1941)
- Caprice, Danse, Églogue for clarinet (or saxophone, or flute) and piano, Op. 335 (1954)
- Sonatina for oboe and piano, Op. 337 (1954)
- Duo Concertante for clarinet and piano, Op. 351 (1956)

Duo

- Suite for Ondes Martenot and piano (arr. of music from Le château des papes) (1933)
- Sonatina for violin and viola, Op. 226 (1941)
- Sonatina for violin and cello, Op. 324 (1953)
- Sonatina for viola and cello, Op. 378 (1959)

Trio

- Sonata for two violins and piano, Op. 15 (1914)
- Pastorale for oboe, clarinet and bassoon, Op. 147 (1935)
- Suite for violin, clarinet and piano, Op. 157b (1936); after the incidental music Le voyageur sans bagage, Op. 157
- Suite d'après Corrette for oboe, clarinet and bassoon, Op. 161b (1937); after the incidental music Roméo et Juliette, Op. 161 (1937)

- Sonatine à 3 for string trio, Op. 221b (1940)
- String Trio, Op. 274 (1947)
- Fanfare for 2 trumpets and trombone, Op. 400 (1962)
- Piano Trio, Op. 428 (1968)

Quartets

- String Quartet No. 1, Op. 5 (1912)
- String Quartet No. 2, Op. 16 (1914–1915)
- String Quartet No. 3 with solo voice, Op. 32 (1916); poem by Léo Latil
- String Quartet No. 4, Op. 46 (1918)
- Sonata for flute, oboe, clarinet and piano, Op. 47 (1918)
- String Quartet No. 5, Op. 64 (1920)
- String Quartet No. 6, Op. 77 (1922)
- String Quartet No. 7, Op. 87 (1925)
- String Quartet No. 8, Op. 121 (1932)
- String Quartet No. 9, Op. 140 (1935)
- La reine de Saba for string quartet, Op. 207 (1939)
- String Quartet No. 10 Anniversaire ("Birthday Quartet"), Op. 218 (1940)
- String Quartet No. 11, Op. 232 (1942)
- String Quartet No. 12, Op. 252 (1945)
- String Quartet No. 13, Op. 268 (1946)
- String Quartet No. 14, Op. 291 No. 1 (1948–1949); The 14th and 15th string quartets can be performed separately as well as simultaneously as a string octet.
- String Quartet No. 15, Op. 291 No. 2 (1948–1949); For another example of a composer writing works for simultaneous performance, see 19th century composer Pietro Raimondi.
- String Quartet No. 16, Op. 303 (1950)
- String Quartet No. 17, Op. 307 (1950)
- String Quartet No. 18, Op. 308 (1950)
- Fanfare (150 mesures pour les 150 ans de la maison Heugel) for 2 trumpets and 2 trombones, Op. 400 (1962)
- Piano Quartet, Op. 417 (1966)
- Homage à Igor Stravinsky for string quartet, Op. 435 (1971)
- 3 Études sur des thèmes du Comtat Venaissin for string quartet, Op. 442 (1973)

Quintets

- La création du monde, Op. 81b (1923) for piano and string quartet (arrangement by the composer of the ballet)
- La cheminée du roi René, Suite for wind quintet, Op. 205 (1939); 7 pieces
- 4 Ésquisses (4 Sketches) for wind quintet, Op. 227b (1941); original for piano
- Les rêves de Jacob, Dance Suite for oboe, violin, viola, cello and double bass, Op. 294 (1949)
- Divertissement for wind quintet, Op. 299b (1958); after the film score Gauguin, Op. 299
- Quintet No. 1 for 2 violins, viola, cello and piano, Op. 312 (1950)
- Quintet No. 2 for 2 violins, viola, cello and double bass, Op. 316 (1952)
- Quintet No. 3 for 2 violins, 2 violas and cello, Op. 325 (1953–1954)
- Quintet No. 4 for 2 violins, viola and 2 cellos, Op. 350 (1956)
- Wind Quintet, Op. 443 (1973)

Sextets and septets

- String Sextet, Op. 368 (1958)
- String Septet for 2 violins, 2 violas, 2 cellos and double bass, Op. 408 (1964); The second movement of the septet, entitled 'Etude in controlled chance' is a rare example of Milhaud embracing aleatoric compositional devices.

== Keyboard ==
Organ

- Sonata, Op. 112 (1931)
- Pastorale, Op. 229 (1941)
- 9 Préludes, Op. 231b (1942); after the incidental music L'annonce faite à Marie, Op. 231
- Petite suite, Op. 348 (1955)

Piano

- Suite, Op. 8 (1913)
- Mazurka (1914); published in L'Album des Six (1920)
- Variations sur un thème de Cliquet, Op. 23 (1915)
- Printemps, Book I, Op. 25 (1915–1919)
- Sonata No. 1, Op. 33 (1916)
- Printemps, Book II, Op. 66 (1919–1920)
- Saudades do Brasil, Op. 67 (1920–1921); 12 pieces; also orchestrated
- Caramel Mou, Op. 68 (1920); also arranged for voice and jazz band
- 3 Rag-Caprices, Op. 78 (1922); also orchestrated
- Choral, Op. 111 (1930)
- L'automne, Op. 115 (1932); 3 pieces
- L'album de Madame Bovary, Op. 128b (1933); after the film music Madame Bovary, Op. 128
- 3 Valses, Op. 128c (1933); after the film music Madame Bovary, Op. 128
- 4 Romances sans paroles, Op. 129 (1933)
- Promenade (Le tour de l'exposition), Op. 162 (1933, revised 1937)
- Touches blanches, Easy Pieces, Op. 222 No. 1 (1941)
- Touches noires, Easy Pieces, Op. 222 No. 2 (1941)
- Choral (Hommage à Paderewski) (1941)
- 4 Ésquisses (4 Sketches), Op. 227 (1941); also orchestrated and for wind quintet
- La libertadora, Op. 236 (1943); also for 2 pianos
- La muse ménagère, Op. 245 (1944); 15 pieces; also orchestrated
- Une journée, Op. 269 (1946); 5 pieces
- Méditation, Op. 277 (1947)
- L'enfant aime, Suite "A Child Loves", Op. 289 (1948); 5 pieces
- Sonata No. 2, Op. 293 (1949)
- Jeu, Op. 302 (c.1950); published in the album Les contemporains
- Le candélabre à sept branches, Op. 315 (1951); 7 pieces
- Accueil amical, 17 Pieces for Children, Op. 326 (1944–1948)
- Hymne de glorification, Op. 331 (1953–1954)
- La couronne de Marguerite (Valse en forme de rondo), Op. 353 (1956); orchestrated for the suite Variations sur le nom de Marguerite Long
- Sonatina, Op. 354 (1956), 1956;
- Le globe-trotter, Op. 358 (1956); 6 pieces; also orchestrated
- Les charmes de la vie (Hommage à Watteau), Op. 360 (1957); also orchestrated
- Six danses en trois mouvements, Op. 433 (1969–1970); also for 2 pianos

Piano 4-Hands

- Enfantines, Suite after 3 poèmes de Jean Cocteau, Op. 59a (1920); 3 pieces

2 Pianos

- Le bœuf sur le toit, Op. 58a (1919); after the ballet
- Scaramouche, Suite, Op. 165b (1937); after the incidental music Le médécin volant, Op. 165
- La libertadora, Op. 236a (1943); 5 pieces; also for piano
- Les songes, Op. 237 (1943); 3 pieces; after the ballet, Op. 124 (1933)
- Le bal martiniquais, Op. 249 (1944); 2 pieces; also orchestrated
- Carnaval à la Nouvelle-Orléans, Op. 275 (1947); 4 pieces
- Kentuckiana, divertissement sur 20 airs du Kentucky, Op. 287 (1948); also orchestrated
- Six danses en trois mouvements, Op. 433 (1969–1970); also for piano

4 Pianos

- Paris for 4 pianos, Op. 284 (1948); also orchestrated

== Works for children ==
- À propos de bottes, Musical Story for Children, for voice, mixed chorus and piano (or violin and cello), Op. 118 (1932); words by René Chalupt
- Un petit peu de musique, Musical Play for children's chorus and piano, Op. 119 (1932); words by Armand Lunel
- Un petit peu d'exercice, Musical Play for children's chorus and piano, Op. 133 (1934); words by Armand Lunel
- Récréation, 4 children's songs for voice and piano, Op. 195 (1938); words by Jacqueline Kriéger
- Sornettes, Op. 214 (1940); words by Frédéric Mistral
- Deux chansons d'enfants (2 Children's Songs) for children's chorus and piano, Op. 217 (1940); words by Henri Fluchère
  1. Cours de solfège
  2. Papillon, papillonette!
- Touches noirs, touches blanches for piano, Op. 222 (1941)
- Acceuil amical (Friendly Welcome) for piano, Op. 326 (1944–1948)
- Une journée for piano, Op. 269 (1946)
- L'enfant aime (A Child Loves), 5 pieces for piano, Op. 289 (1948)
- Service pour la veille du sabbat for children's chorus and organ, Op. 345 (1955); Biblical text

== Choral ==
- Psaume 136 for baritone, chorus and orchestra, Op. 53 No. 1 (1918); translation by Paul Claudel
- Psaume 121 (a.k.a. Psaume 126 [Vulgata 126]) for male chorus a cappella, Op. 72 (1921); translation by Paul Claudel; written for the Harvard Glee Club after their 1921 tour of Europe
- Cantate pour louer le Seigneur for soloists, chorus, children's chorus, organ and orchestra, Op. 103 (1928); text: Psalms 117, 121, 123, 150
- 2 Poèmes extraits de l'anthologie nègre de Blaise Cendrars for vocal quartet or chorus and chamber orchestra, Op. 113 (1932); text by Blaise Cendrars
- 2 Élégies romaines for female vocal quartet or female chorus, Op. 114 (1932); text by Johann Wolfgang von Goethe
- La mort du tyran for mixed chorus, flute, clarinet, tuba and percussion, Op. 116 (1932); text by Lampride, translation by D. Diderot
- Adages, 16 songs for vocal quartet, chorus and chamber orchestra (or piano), Op. 120c (1932); words by André de Richaud
- Devant sa main nue for female chorus or vocal quartet, Op. 122 (1933); words by Marcel Raval
- Pan et la Syrinx, Cantata for soprano, baritone, mixed chorus, flute, oboe, alto saxophone, bassoon and piano, Op. 130 (1934); words principally by Paul Claudel
- Les amours de Ronsard, 4 songs for mixed chorus or vocal quartet and chamber orchestra, Op. 132 (1934)
- Cantique du Rhône, 4 songs for chorus or vocal quartet, Op. 155 (1936); words by Paul Claudel
- Cantate de la paix for male chorus and children's chorus, Op. 166 (1937); words by Paul Claudel
- Main tendue à tous for mixed chorus a cappella, Op. 169 (1937); words by Charles Vildrac
- Les deux cités, Cantata for mixed chorus a cappella, Op. 170 (1937); words by Paul Claudel
- Quatre chants populaires de Provence for mixed chorus and orchestra, Op. 194 (1938)
- 3 Incantations for male chorus a cappella, Op. 201 (1939); Aztec poems by Alejo Carpentier
- Quatrains valaisans for mixed chorus a cappella, Op. 206 (1939); words by Rainer Maria Rilke
- Cantate de la guerre for mixed chorus a cappella, Op. 213 (1940); words by Paul Claudel
- Borechou – Schema Israël (Bless Ye the Lord – O Hear, Israel) for cantor, chorus and organ, Op. 239 (1944); Biblical text
- Kaddish (Prière pour les morts) for cantor, chorus and organ, Op. 250 (1945); Biblical text
- Pledge to Mills for unison mixed chorus and piano, Op. 261 (1945); words by George Percy Hedley
- 6 Sonnets composés au secret for chorus or vocal quartet, Op. 266 (1946); text by Jean Cassou
- Symphony No. 3 "Te Deum" for chorus and orchestra, Op. 271 (1946)
- Service sacré pour le samedi matin for baritone, reciter, chorus and orchestra or organ, Op. 279 (1947); Biblical text
- Lekha Dodi (L'choh dodi) for cantor, chorus and organ, Op. 290 (1948); text from the Jewish Sabbath evening liturgy
- Naissance de Vénus, Cantata for mixed chorus a cappella, Op. 292 (1949); words by Jules Supervielle
- Barba Garibo, Cantata for mixed chorus and orchestra, Op. 298 (1949–1950); words by Armand Lunel
- Cantate des proverbes for female chorus, oboe, cello and harpsichord, Op. 310 (1950); Biblical text
- Les miracles de la foi, Cantata for tenor, chorus and orchestra, Op. 314 (1951); Biblical text from Daniel
- Le château de feu, Cantata for chorus and orchestra, Op. 338 (1954); text by Jean Cassou; written in memory of Jews killed during the war by the Nazis
- 3 Psaumes de David for mixed chorus a cappella, Op. 339 (1954)
- 2 Poèmes de Louise de Vilmorin for chorus or vocal quartet, Op. 347 (1955); words by Louise Leveque de Vilmorin
- Le mariage de la feuille et du cliché for soloists, chorus, orchestra and tape, Op. 357 (1956); text by Max Gérard, musique concrète by Pierre Henry
- La tragédie humaine for chorus and orchestra, Op. 369 (1958); text by Agrippa d'Aubigné
- 8 Poèmes de Jorge Guillén for mixed chorus a cappella, Op. 371 (1958); words by Jorge Guillén
- Cantate de la croix de Charité for soloists, chorus, children's chorus and orchestra, Op. 381 (1959–1960); text by Loys Masson
- Cantate sur des textes de Chaucer for chorus and orchestra, Op. 386 (1960); text by Geoffrey Chaucer
- Cantate de l'initiation for mixed chorus and orchestra (or organ), Op. 388 (1960); Hebrew and French liturgical text
- Traversée for mixed chorus, Op. 393 (1961); words by Paul Verlaine
- Invocation à l'ange Raphaël, Cantata for double female chorus and orchestra, Op. 395 (1962); words by Paul Claudel
- Caroles, Cantata for chorus and 4 instrumental groups, Op. 402 (1963); text by Charles d'Orléans
- Pacem in terris, Choral Symphony for alto, baritone, chorus and orchestra, Op. 404 (1963); text by Pope John XXIII
- Cantate de Job (Cantata from Job) for baritone, chorus and organ, Op. 413 (1965); Biblical text
- Promesse de Dieu for mixed chorus a cappella, Op. 438 (1971–1972); Biblical text
- Les momies d'Égypte, Choral Comedy for mixed chorus a cappella, Op. 439 (1972); text by Jean-François Regnard
- Ani maamin, un chant perdu et retrouvé for soprano, 4 reciter, chorus and orchestra, Op. 441 (1972); text by Elie Wiesel

== Vocal ==
Solo voice

- Cantique de Notre-Dame de Sarrance, Op. 29 (1915); words by Francis Jammes

Voice and organ

- 5 Prières for voice and organ (or piano), Op. 231c (1942); Latin liturgical texts adapted by Paul Claudel
- Ecoutez mes enfants for voice and organ, Op. 359 (1957)

Voice and piano

- Désespoir (1909); words by Armand Lunel
- Poèmes de Francis Jammes, 2 Sets, Op. 1 (1910–1912); words by Francis Jammes
- 3 Poèmes de Léo Latil, Op. 2 (1910–1916); words by Léo Latil
- Poèmes de Francis Jammes, Set 3, Op. 6 (1912); words by Francis Jammes
- 7 Poèmes de La connaissance de l'est, Op. 7 (1912–1913); words by Paul Claudel
- Alissa, Song Cycle for soprano and piano, Op. 9 (1913, revised 1930); words by André Gide
- 3 Poèmes en prose de Lucile de Chateaubriand, Op. 10 (1913); words by Lucile de Chateaubriand
- 3 Poèmes romantiques, set 1, Op. 11 (1913–1914)
- 3 Poèmes romantiques, set 2, Op. 19 (1914)
- 4 Poèmes de Léo Latil, Op. 20 (1914); words by Léo Latil
- Le château, Op. 21 (1914); cycle of 8 songs; words by Armand Lunel
- Poème de Gitanjali, Op. 22 (1914); words by Rabindranath Tagore; translation by André Gide
- 4 Poèmes de Paul Claudel for baritone and piano, Op. 26 (1915–1917); words by Paul Claudel
- D'un cahier inédit du journal d'Eugénie de Guérin, Op. 27 (1915); cycle of 3 songs; words by Eugénie de Guérin
- L'arbre exotique, Op. 28 (1915); words by Chevalier Gosse
- 2 Poèmes d'amour, Op. 30 (1915); words by Rabindranath Tagore
- 2 Poèmes de Coventry Patmore, Op. 31 (1915); original English words by Coventry Patmore; translation by Paul Claudel
- Poèmes juifs, Op. 34 (1916); 8 songs
- Child Poems, Op. 36 (1916); 5 songs; words by Rabindranath Tagore
- 3 Poèmes, Op. 37 (1916); also with chamber orchestra; words by Christina Rossetti and Alice Meynell
- Chanson bas, Op. 44 (1917); 8 songs; words by Stéphane Mallarmé
- Dans les rues de Rio (2 versos cariocas de Paul Claudel), Op. 44a (1917); words by Paul Claudel
- 2 Poèmes de Rimbaud, Op. 45 (1917); words by Arthur Rimbaud
- À la Toussaint (1911); words by Baronne de Grand Maison
- 4 Poèmes de Francis Jammes, Set 4, Op. 50 (1918); words by Francis Jammes
- 2 Petits airs, Op. 51 (1918); words by Stéphane Mallarmé
- Poèmes de Francis Thompson, Op. 54 (1919); words by Francis Thompson; translation by Paul Claudel
- Les soirées de Pétrograd, Op. 55 (1919); 12 songs; words by René Chalupt
- 3 Poèmes de Jean Cocteau, Op. 59 (1920); words by Jean Cocteau
- Catalogue de fleurs for voice and piano or 7 instruments, Op. 60 (1920); words by Lucien Daudet
- Feuilles de température, Op. 65 (1920); 3 songs; words by Paul Morand
- Poème du journal intime de Léo Latil for baritone and piano, Op. 73 (1921); words by Léo Latil
- 6 Chants populaires hébraïques for voice and piano or orchestra, Op. 86 (1925)
- Pièce de circonstance, Op. 90 (1926); words by Jean Cocteau
- Impromptu, Op. 91 (1926); words by Jean Cocteau
- Prières journalières à l'usage des juifs du Comtat Venaissin, Op. 96 (1927); 3 songs; Biblical text
- Vocalise, Op. 105 (1928)
- Quatrain à Albert Roussel, Op. 106 (1929); words by Francis Jammes
- A Flower Given to My Child (1930); words by James Joyce
- Le funeste retour (Chanson de marin sur un texte canadien du XVIIè siècle), Op. 123 (1933)
- Liturgie comtadine: chants de Rosch Haschanah, 5 songs for voice and piano or chamber orchestra, Op. 125 (1933)
- 2 Chansons de Madame Bovary, Op. 128d (1933); words by Gustave Flaubert
- Le cygne, Op. 142 (1935); 2 versions; words by Paul Claudel
- Quatrain, Op. 143 (1935); words by Albert Flament
- 3 Chansons de négresse for voice and orchestra or piano, Op. 148b (1935–1936); words by Jules Supervielle
- Chansons de théâtre, Op. 151b (1936); 6 songs; words by Jules Supervielle, R. Lenormand, G. Pitoeff
- 3 Chansons de troubadour, Op. 152b (1936); words by Jean Valmy-Baisse
- 5 Chansons de Charles Vildrac for voice and piano or chamber orchestra, Op. 167 (1937); words by Charles Vildrac
- Rondeau, Op. 178 (1937); words by Pierre Corneille
- Airs populaires palestiniens, Op. 179 (1937)
  1. Holem tsuadi
  2. Gam hayom
- Quatrain, Op. 180 (1937); words by Stéphane Mallarmé
- La couronne de gloire, Cantata for voice and chamber ensemble (flute, trumpet, string quartet) or piano, Op. 211 (1940); words by Solomon ibn Gabirol, Armand Lunel
- Le voyage d'été, Op. 216 (1940); words by Camille Paliard
- 4 Chansons de Ronsard for voice and orchestra or piano, Op. 223 (1940); words by Pierre de Ronsard
- 5 Prières for voice and organ (or piano), Op. 231c (1942); Latin liturgical texts adapted by Paul Claudel
- Rêves, Op. 233 (1942); anonymous 20th-century text
- La libération des Antilles, Op. 246 (1944); words by Henri Hoppenot
- Printemps lointain, Op. 253 (1944); words by Francis Jammes
- Chants de misère, Op. 265 (1946); words by Camille Paliard
- 3 Poèmes, Op. 276 (1947); words by Jules Supervielle
- Ballade nocturne, Op. 296 (1949); a movement from a collaborative work entitled Mouvements du cœur: Un hommage à la mémoire de Frédéric Chopin, 1849–1949; words by Louise de Vilmorin
- Les temps faciles, Op. 305 (1950); words by Marsan
- Petites légendes, Op. 319 (1952); words by Maurice Carême
- Fontaines et sources for voice and orchestra or piano, Op. 352 (1956); 6 songs; words by Francis Jammes
- Tristesses, Op. 355 (1956); cycle of 24 songs; words by Francis Jammes
- Préparatif à la mort en allégorie maritime, Op. 403 (1963); words by Agrippa d'Aubigné
- L'amour chante, Op. 409 (1964); 9 songs

Voice (or reciter) and ensemble

- 3 Poèmes, Op. 37 (1916); also with piano; words by Christina Rossetti and Alice Meynell
- Le retour de l'enfant prodigue, cantata for 5 voices and chamber ensemble or 2 pianos, Op. 42 (1917); words by André Gide
- Psaumes 136 et 129 for baritone and orchestra, Op. 53 (1918–1919); translation by Paul Claudel
- Machines agricoles, 6 Pastorales for voice and chamber ensemble, Op. 56 (1919); Texts taken out of a catalogue for agricultural machines.
- Catalogue de fleurs for voice and chamber ensemble (or piano), Op. 60 (1920); words by Lucien Daudet
- Cocktail for voice and 3 clarinets, Op. 69 (1920); words by Larsen
- 4 Poèmes de Catulle for voice and violin, Op. 80 (1923); words by Catullus
- 6 Chants populaires hébraïques for voice and piano or orchestra, Op. 86 (1925)
- 3 Chansons de négresse for voice and orchestra or piano, Op. 148b (1935–1936); words by Jules Supervielle
- Liturgie comtadine: chants de Rosch Haschanah, 5 songs for voice and piano or chamber orchestra, Op. 125 (1933)
- 5 Chansons de Charles Vildrac for voice and piano or chamber orchestra, Op. 167 (1937); words by Charles Vildrac
- Cantate nuptiale for voice and orchestra, Op. 168 (1937); Biblical text from Song of Solomon
- Cantate de l'enfant et de la mère for narrator, string quartet and piano, Op. 185 (1938); story by Maurice Carême
- Les quatre éléments, Cantata for soprano and orchestra, Op. 189 (1938, revised 1956); words by Robert Desnos
- La couronne de gloire, Cantata for voice and chamber ensemble (flute, trumpet, string quartet) or piano, Op. 211 (1940); words by Solomon ibn Gabirol, Armand Lunel
- 4 Chansons de Ronsard for voice and orchestra or piano, Op. 223 (1940); words by Pierre de Ronsard
- Caïn et Abel for reciter and orchestra, Op. 241 (1944); Biblical text from Genesis
- Fontaines et sources, 6 songs for voice and orchestra or piano, Op. 352 (1956); words by Francis Jammes
- Neige sur la fleuve for voice and chamber ensemble, Op. 391 (1961); words by Tsang Yung
- Suite de quatrains, 18 poems for reciter and chamber ensemble, Op. 398 (1962); words by Francis Jammes
- Adieu, Cantata for voice, flute, viola and harp, Op. 410 (1964); words by Arthur Rimbaud
- Cantate de psaumes for baritone and orchestra, Op. 425 (1967); Psalms 129, 146, 147, 128, 127, 136 (Psalms 129 and 136 from Op. 53); translation by Paul Claudel

2 or more voices

- 2 Poèmes for vocal quartet, Op. 39 (1916–1918); text by Saint Léger, René Chalupt
- 2 Poèmes tupis, Op. 52 (1918); 4 female voices and hand-clapping; American Indian text
- 2 Élégies romaines, Op. 114 (1932); for 2 sopranos and 2 altos or female chorus; text by Johann Wolfgang von Goethe
- Adam for soprano, 2 tenors and 2 baritones, Op. 411 (1964); text by Jean Cocteau

2 or more voices and piano

- 2 Poèmes du Gardener, Op. 35 (1916–1917); for 2 voices and piano; words by Rabindranath Tagore and Elisabeth Sainte-Marie Perrin
- No. 34 de L'église habillée de feuilles, Op. 38 (1916); for vocal quartet and piano 6-hands; words by Francis Jammes

2 or more voices and ensemble

- Pan et la Syrinx for soprano, baritone, vocal quartet and wind quartet and piano, Op. 130 (1934); words by Pierre-Antoine-Augustin de Piis, Paul Claudel
- Cantate de l'Homme for vocal quartet, reciter and chamber ensemble, Op. 164 (1937); words by Robert Desnos
- Prends cette rose for soprano, tenor and orchestra, Op. 183 (1937); words by Pierre de Ronsard
- 3 Élégies for soprano, tenor and string orchestra, Op. 199 (1939); words by Francis Jammes
- Suite de sonnets, Cantata on 16th century verses for vocal quartet and chamber ensemble, Op. 401 (1963)
- Hommage à Comenius, Cantata for soprano, baritone and orchestra, Op. 421 (1966); text by John Amos Comenius

== Incidental music ==
- Agamemnon, Op. 14 (1913–1914); L'Orestie d'Eschyle (Orestiean Trilogy No. 1) for soprano, male chorus and orchestra; Paul Claudel translation of the drama by Aeschylus; premiere 1927
- Protée, Op. 17 (1913–1919); for chorus and orchestra; play by Paul Claudel; 2nd version, Op. 341
- Les Choéphores, Op. 24 (1915); L'Orestie d'Eschyle (Orestiean Trilogy No. 2); Paul Claudel translation of the drama by Aeschylus; premiere 1919
- L'Ours et la Lune (1918); play by Paul Claudel
- L'annonce faite à Marie, Op. 117 (1932); for 4 voices and chamber orchestra; play by Paul Claudel; 2nd version, Op. 231
- Le château des papes, Op. 120 (1932); for orchestra; play by André de Richaud
- Se plaire sur la même fleur, Op. 131 (1934) for voice and piano; play by Moreno, translation by Casa Fuerte
- Le cycle de la création, Op. 139 (1935); for voice, chorus and orchestra; play by Sturzo
- Le faiseur, Op. 145 (1935) for flute, clarinet, saxophone and percussion; play by Honoré de Balzac
- Bolivar, Op. 148 (1935–1936); for voice, chorus and chamber orchestra; play by Jules Supervielle
- La folle du ciel, Op. 149 (1936); play by Henri-René Lenormand
- Tu ne m'échapperas jamais, Op. 151 (1936); play by Margaret Kennedy
- Bertran de Born, Op. 152a (1936); for soloists, chorus and orchestra; play by Valmy-Baisse
- Le trompeur de Séville, Op. 152e (1937); play by André Obey
- Le quatorze juillet, Op. 153 (1936); Introduction and Marche funèbre for finale of Act 1 only; play by Romain Rolland
- Le conquérant, Op. 154 (1936); for chamber orchestra; play by Jean Mistler
- Amal, ou La lettre du roi, Op. 156 (1936); for piano, violin and clarinet; play by Rabindranath Tagore and André Gide
- Le voyageur sans bagage (The Traveller without Luggage), Op. 157 (1936); for piano, violin and clarinet; play by Jean Anouilh
- Jules César, Op. 158 (1936); for flute, clarinet (or saxophone), trumpet, tuba and percussion; play by William Shakespeare
- La duchesse d'Amalfi, Op. 160 (1937); for oboe, clarinet and bassoon; Henri Fluchère after John Webster
- Roméo et Juliette, Op. 161 (1937); for oboe, clarinet and bassoon; Simone Jollivet play after Pierre Jean Jouve and William Shakespeare
- Liberté, Op. 163 (1937); Overture and Interlude only
- Le médecin volant, Op. 165 (1937); for piano and clarinet (or saxophone); play by Charles Vildrac after Molière
- Naissance d'une cité, Op. 173 (1937); 2 songs for voice and piano (or orchestra); words by Jean Richard Bloch
  1. Chanson du capitaine
  2. Java de la femme
- Macbeth, Op. 175 (1937); for flute, clarinet, bassoon, violin, cello, trumpet and percussion; play by William Shakespeare
- Hécube, Op. 177 (1937); for flute, clarinet, bassoon, trumpet and percussion; André de Richaud translation of the drama by Euripides
- Plutus, Op. 186 (1938); for voice and orchestra; Simone Jollivet translation of the drama by Aristophanes
- Tricolore, Op. 190 (1938); play by Pierre Lestringuez
- Le bal des voleurs, Op. 192 (1938); for clarinet and saxophone; play by Jean Anouilh
- La première famille, Op. 193 (1938); play by Jules Supervielle
- Hamlet, Op. 200 (1939); play by Jules Laforgue
- Un petit ange de rien du tout, Op. 215 (1940); play by Claude-André Puget
- L'annonce faite à Marie, Op. 231 (1942); 2nd version of Op. 117; play by Paul Claudel
- Lidoire, Op. 264 (1946); play by Georges Courteline
- La maison de Bernarda Alba, Op. 280 (1947); play by Federico García Lorca
- Shéhérazade, Op. 285 (1948); play by Jules Supervielle
- Le jeu de Robin et Marion, Op. 288 (1948); for voice, flute, clarinet, saxophone, violin and cello; adapted from Adam de la Halle
- Le conte d'hiver, Op. 306 (1950); Claude-André Puget translation of the Shakespeare play
- Christophe Colomb, Op. 318 (1952); for chorus and orchestra; play by Paul Claudel
- Saül, Op. 334 (1954); play by André Gide
- Protée, Op. 341 (1955); 2nd version of Op. 17; play by Paul Claudel
- Juanito, Op. 349 (1955); play by Pierre Humblot
- Mother Courage, Op. 379 (1959); play by Bertolt Brecht
- Judith , Op. 392 (1961); play by Jean Giraudoux
- Jérusalem à Carpentras, Op. 419 (1966); play by Armand Lunel
- L'histoire de Tobie et Sarah, Op. 426 (1968); play by Paul Claudel

== Miscellaneous stage works ==
- La sagesse, Stage Spectacle for 4 voices, reciter, mixed chorus and orchestra, Op. 141 (1935); words by Paul Claudel
- Fête de la musique, Light and Water Spectacle, Op. 159 (1937); words by Paul Claudel
- Vézelay, la colline éternelle, Op. 423 (1967)

== Film scores ==
- The Beloved Vagabond (1915)
- Le roi de Camargue (1921); music also by Henri Sauguet; directed by André Hugon
- L'Inhumaine (1924); directed by Marcel L'Herbier
- Actualités, Op. 104 (1928)
- La p'tite Lilie, Op. 107 (1929); directed by Alberto Cavalcanti
- Las Hurdes: Tierra Sin Pan (1932); directed by Luis Buñuel
- Hallo Everybody, Op. 126 (1933); Dutch documentary short; directed by Hans Richter
- Madame Bovary, Op. 128 (1933); directed by Jean Renoir
- L'hippocampe, Op. 137 (1934); directed by Jean Painlevé
- Tartarin de Tarascon, Op. 138 (1934); based on the novel by Alphonse Daudet; directed by Raymond Bernard
- Voix d'enfants, Op. 146 (1935); directed by Reynaud
- Le vagabond bien-aimé (The Beloved Vagabond), Op. 150 (1936); directed by Curtis Bernhardt
- Mollenard, Op. 174 (composed 1937); film released in 1938; directed by Robert Siodmak
- La citadelle du silence (The Citadel of Silence), Op. 176 (1937); collaboration with Arthur Honegger; directed by Marcel L'Herbier
- Grands feux, Op. 182 (1937); directed by Alexandre Alexeieff
- La conquête du ciel, Op. 184 (1937); directed by Hans Richter
- La tragédie impériale (a.k.a. Rasputin), Op. 187 (1938); directed by Marcel L'Herbier
- Les otages (The Mayor's Dilemma), Op. 196 (1938); directed by Raymond Bernard
- The Islanders, Op. 198 (1939); directed by Maurice Harvey
- L'espoir (Days of Hope or Man's Hope), Op. 202 (1939); written and directed by André Malraux and Boris Peskine
- Cavalcade d'amour (Love Cavalcade), Op. 204 (1939); collaboration with Arthur Honegger; directed by Raymond Bernard
- Gulf Stream, Op. 208 (1939); directed by Alexandre Alexeieff
- The Private Affairs of Bel Ami, Op. 272 (1946); directed by Albert Lewin
- Dreams That Money Can Buy, Op. 273 (1947); Ruth, Roses and Revolvers sequence only; directed by Hans Richter
- Gauguin, Op. 299 (1950); directed by Alain Resnais; used in Pictura (1951), co-directed by Resnais
- La vie commence demain (Life Begins Tomorrow), Op. 304 (1950); music also by Manuel Rosenthal; written and directed by Nicole Védrès
- Ils étaient tous des volontaires, Op. 336 (1954)
- Rentrée des classes (1956); film short; directed by Jacques Rozier
- Celle qui n'était plus (Histoire d'une folle), Op. 364 (1957); directed by G. Colpi
- Péron et Evita, Op. 372 (1958); historical TV documentary narrated by Walter Cronkite
- Burma Road and the Hump, Op. 375 (1959); historical TV documentary narrated by Walter Cronkite
- Paul Claudel, Op. 427 (1968); directed by A. Gillet

== Radio scores ==
- Voyage au pays du rêve, Op. 203 (1939)
- Le grand testament, Op. 282 (1948)
- La fin du monde, Op. 297 (1949); by Blaise Cendrars
- Le repos du septième jour, Op. 301 (1950); by Paul Claudel
- Samaël, Op. 321 (1953); by André Spire
- Le dibbouk, Op. 329 (1953); by S. Ansky

== Electroacoustic music ==
- Étude poétique, Op. 333 (1954)
- La rivière endormie (1954)

== Collaborations ==
- L'Album des Six
- Genesis Suite
- Homage to Paderewski
