= Symphony No. 3 (Milhaud) =

Symphony by Darius Milhaud

The Symphony No. 3, Op. 271, sub-titled Te Deum, is a work for orchestra and chorus by French composer Darius Milhaud. The piece originated in a 1946 request by Radio France for a Te Deum celebrating the allied victory in World War II. Instead of confining himself to a setting of the liturgical text, Milhaud delivered a four-movement symphony in which the orchestra plays two movements (I and III) alone. The chorus joins without words in Movement II; only in the finale is the Latin text of the Te Deum sung. This symphony is not to be confused with Milhaud's Chamber Symphony No. 3 "Sérénade," op. 71 (1921).

Milhaud's Third Symphony has a total running time of about 27 minutes. The descriptive titles of the movements are as follows:

1. Fièrement (approx. 5'45")
2. Très recueilli (approx. 10')
3. Pastorale (approx. 4')
4. Hymnus Ambrosianus—Te Deum (approx. 7'15")

This symphony is published by Heugel & Cie. Recordings of this symphony include a 1997 all-digital recording by Alun Francis and the Radio-Sinfonieorchester Basel, part of a boxed set of Milhaud's Symphonies No. 1-12 on CPO.
