= Symphony No. 7 (Milhaud) =

Symphony by Darius Milhaud

The Symphony No. 7, Op. 344, is a work for orchestra by French composer Darius Milhaud. The piece was written in 1955 for a Radio Belge concert in Venice.

Milhaud's Seventh Symphony has three movements and a total running time of about 20 minutes. The titles of the movements, as descriptive of their character as of tempo, are as follows:

1. Animé (approx. 3'40")
2. Grave (approx. 9')
3. Vif (approx. 7'15")

This symphony is published by Heugel & Cie.

== Recordings ==
- a 1993 all-digital recording by Alun Francis and the Radio-Sinfonieorchester Basel, part of a boxed set of Milhaud's Symphonies No. 1–12 on CPO
- a 1997 all-digital recording by Michel Plasson and the Toulouse Capitole Orchestra on Deutsche Grammophon
