= Symphony No. 12 (Milhaud) =

Symphony by Darius Milhaud

The Symphony No. 12, Op. 390, subtitled La Rurale, is a work for orchestra by French composer Darius Milhaud. The piece was written in 1961 for the dedication of the concert hall at the University of California, Davis, a campus historically focused on agricultural studies.

Milhaud's Twelfth Symphony is a four-movement work with a total running time of about 16 minutes. The titles of the movements, as descriptive of their character as of tempo, are as follows:

1. Pastoral (approx. 3'45")
2. Vif et gai (approx. 3'13")
3. Paisible (approx. 3'45")
4. Lumineux (approx. 5'00")

This symphony is published by Heugel & Cie. Recordings of this symphony include a 1995 all-digital recording by Alun Francis and the Radio-Sinfonieorchester Basel, part of a boxed set of Milhaud's Symphonies No. 1–12 on CPO.
