= Symphony No. 9 (Milhaud) =

Work for orchestra by Darius Milhaud

The Symphony No. 9, Op. 380, is a work for orchestra by French composer Darius Milhaud. The piece was written in 1959 for the Fort Lauderdale Symphony Orchestra and its conductor Mario di Bonaventura.

Milhaud's Ninth Symphony is a three-movement work with a total running time of about 19 minutes. The titles of the movements, as descriptive of their character as of tempo, are as follows:

1. Modérement animé (approx. 5'10")
2. Lent et sombre (approx. 9'10")
3. Alerte et vigoureux (approx. 4'45")

This symphony is published by Heugel & Cie. Recordings of this symphony include a 1993 all-digital recording by Alun Francis and the Radio-Sinfonieorchester Basel, part of a boxed set of Milhaud's Symphonies No. 1–12 on CPO.
