= Symphony No. 11 (Milhaud) =

Symphony by Darius Milhaud

The Symphony No. 11, Op. 384, nicknamed Romantique, is a work for orchestra by French composer Darius Milhaud. The piece was written in 1960 on a joint commission from the Dallas Symphony Orchestra and the Dallas Public Library, and received its premiere under conductor Paul Kletzki.

Milhaud's Eleventh Symphony is a three-movement work with a total running time of about 19 minutes. The titles of the movements, as descriptive of their character as of tempo, are as follows:

1. Intense (approx. 4'20")
2. Méditatif (approx. 9'30")
3. Emporté (approx. 5'15")

This symphony is published by Heugel & Cie. Recordings of this symphony include a 1995 all-digital recording by Alun Francis and the Radio-Sinfonieorchester Basel, part of a boxed set of Milhaud's Symphonies No. 1–12 on CPO.
