= Symphony No. 8 (Milhaud) =

Symphony composed by Darius Milhaud

The Symphony No. 8, Op. 362, subtitled Rhôdanienne, is a work for orchestra by French composer Darius Milhaud. The piece was written in 1957 on a commission from the University of California. Its four programmatic movements paint a musical landscape of the course of the Rhone River.

Milhaud's Eighth Symphony has a total running time of about 22 minutes. The titles of the movements, as descriptive of their character as of tempo, are as follows:

1. Avec mystère et violence (approx. 5'25")
2. Avec sérénité et nochalence (approx. 7'25")
3. Avec emportement (approx. 4'30")
4. Rapide et majestueux (approx. 4'50")

This symphony is published by Heugel & Cie.

== Recordings ==
- a stereo recording of the composer conducting the orchestra of French Radio, re-released in 2003 on the Apex label
- a 1993 all-digital recording by Alun Francis and the Radio-Sinfonieorchester Basel, part of a boxed set of Milhaud's Symphonies No. 1–12 on CPO
