= Symphony No. 10 (Milhaud) =

The Symphony No. 10, Op. 382, is a work for orchestra by French composer Darius Milhaud. The piece was written in 1960 for the hundredth anniversary of the U.S. state of Oregon.

Milhaud's Tenth Symphony is a four-movement work with a total running time of about 24–25 minutes. The titles of the movements, as descriptive of their character as of tempo, are as follows:

1. Décidé (approx. 5'00")
2. Expressif (approx. 9'30")
3. Fantasque (approx. 4'40")
4. Emporté (approx. 5'00")

This symphony is published by Heugel & Cie. Recordings of this symphony include a 1995 all-digital recording by Alun Francis and the Radio-Sinfonieorchester Basel, part of a boxed set of Milhaud's Symphonies No. 1-12 on CPO.
