= Symphony No. 6 (Milhaud) =

Symphony by Darius Milhaud

The Symphony No. 6, Op. 343, is a work for orchestra by French composer Darius Milhaud. The piece was written in 1955 at the request of Charles Munch, for the seventy-fifth anniversary of the Boston Symphony Orchestra. This work is not to be confused with Milhaud's Chamber Symphony No. 6, op. 79.

Milhaud's Sixth Symphony has four movements and a total running time of about 30 minutes. The titles of the movements, as descriptive of their character as of tempo, are as follows:

1. Calme et tendre (approx. 9')
2. Tumultueux (approx. 6')
3. Lent et doux (approx. 8'45")
4. Joyeux et robuste (approx. 6'30")

This symphony is published by Heugel & Cie.

== Recordings ==
- a stereo recording of the composer himself conducting the Louisville Orchestra, re-released in 2004 on the First Edition label
- a 1992 all-digital recording by Alun Francis and the Radio-Sinfonieorchester Basel, part of a boxed set of Milhaud's Symphonies No. 1-12 on CPO
- a 1997 all-digital recording by Michel Plasson and the Toulouse Capitole Orchestra on Deutsche Grammophon
