= Symphony No. 2 (Milhaud) =

The Symphony No. 2, Op. 247, is a work for orchestra by French composer Darius Milhaud. It was written in the U.S. in 1944 on a commission from the Koussevitzky Music Foundations in memory of Serge Koussevitzky's second wife Natalie, who had died in 1942. The premiere of the work was played by the Boston Symphony Orchestra in 1946, with the composer himself conducting.

Milhaud's Second Symphony is in five movements, with a total running time of about 27 minutes. The titles of the movements, which are more character descriptions than tempo markings, are as follows:

1. Paisible (approx. 5'40")
2. Mystérieux (approx. 5'25")
3. Douloureux (approx. 8'25")
4. Avec Sérénité (approx. 3'15")
5. Alleluia (approx. 4'10")

This symphony (not to be confused with Milhaud's 1918 Chamber Symphony No. 2 "Pastorale," op. 49) is published by Heugel & Cie.

== Recordings ==
- Orchestre de la Société des Concerts du Conservatoire, Conductor: Georges Tzipine (Columbia) - 1953
- Toulouse Capitole Orchestra, Conductor: Michel Plasson (Deutsche Grammophon) - 1991
- Radio-Sinfonieorchester Basel, Conductor: Alun Francis (CPO) - 1997
