= Symphony No. 4 (Milhaud) =

Symphony by Darius Milhaud

The Symphony No. 4, Op. 281, is a work for orchestra by French composer Darius Milhaud. The piece was written in 1947 in response to a request by the French minister of education for a composition celebrating the 100th anniversary of the Revolution of 1848. Milhaud wrote this symphony on board a steamship to France from the U.S., where he had lived since 1940. This symphony is not to be confused with Milhaud's Chamber Symphony No. 4, op. 74 (1921).

Milhaud's Fourth Symphony has four movements and a total running time of a bit over 28 minutes. The outer movements have a military flavor, dominated by wind instruments and percussion. The descriptive titles of the movements are as follows:

1. L'insurrection. Animé (approx. 5')
2. Aux Morts de la République. Lent (approx. 13')
3. Le Joies de la Liberté retrouvée. Modérément animé (approx. 4')
4. Commémoration 1948. Animé (approx. 7'15")

This symphony is published by Editions Salabert.

== Recordings ==
- a 1947 stereo recording featuring the Orchestre Radio-Symphonique, conducted by the composer himself, and re-released in 2003 on the Apex label
- a 1997 all-digital recording by Alun Francis and the Radio-Sinfonieorchester Basel, part of a boxed set of Milhaud's Symphonies No. 1–12 on CPO
