= Op. 281 =

In music, Op. 281 stands for Opus number 281. Compositions that are assigned this number include:

- Milhaud – Symphony No. 4
- Strauss – Vergnügungszug
