= Katharine Mulky Warne =

American composer, pianist and teacher

Katharine Mulky Warne (October 23, 1923 – April 24, 2015) was an American composer, pianist and teacher, who founded the Darius Milhaud Society and organized 15 Milhaud festivals in Cleveland, Ohio, to promote his music. She was born in Oklahoma City, Oklahoma. On June 27, 1953, She married Clinton L. Warne and they had three children: Kate, Clinton Jr. and Carolyn.

Warne studied with Darius Milhard at Mills College (BM 1945); Bernard Wagenaar at the Juilliard School of Music (MM 1947); and Donald Erb at the Cleveland Institute of Music (DMA 1975). She received first prize in the Mills College composition contest in 1944 and 1945 and attended Juilliard on a full fellowship in composition. She won first and second prizes in the Kansas Federation of Music Clubs contest in 1959, and received a grant from the Bascom Little Fund.

Warne held teaching positions at the University of Kansas, Baldwin Wallace Conservatory, Kent State University, and the Laurel School. She wrote an article for The American Music Teacher in 1951 entitled "Some Aspects in the Teaching of Contemporary Music."

She was active in several musical organizations in addition to the Darius Milhaud Society: Mu Phi Epsilon, the Fortnightly Music Club, and the Cleveland Composers Guild. Her personal papers are archived in the Michael Schwartz Library at Cleveland State University, where the papers for the Darius Milhaud Society are also archived.

== Compositions ==
=== Ballet and modern dance ===
- Ta Matete (flute, viola, harp and dancer)

=== Chamber ===
- Airplane Music (violin and piano)
- Colored Reflections (recorder and harp)
- Cryptic Evocation (flute and piano)
- Dispositions (harp)
- Easy Head Joint (flute)
- Ebb and Flow (flute)
- Echologue (two flutes)
- Fantasy (violin and piano)
- Fete (two violins and piano)
- Friendly Conversation (clarinet and piano)
- Fugal Consequences (percussion)
- Interplay (piccolo, trumpet and cello)
- Les Deux (two flute and two violins)
- Meditation (organ)
- Now (two flutes)
- Passacaglia (carillon)
- Sketch (carillon)
- String Quartet
- Tetrad (percussion)
- Uncamouflaged (flute and piano)

=== Orchestra ===
- Apollo-Orion (chamber orchestra)
- Epigenesis

=== Piano and keyboard ===
- Anaphora
- Claude et Francois
- Gay Rondo (two pianos)
- Passacaglia
- Serenata Scherzando
- Sketch for Carillon, 1951 (carillon)
- Suite No. 3
- Theme and Variations
- Toccata
- Whispers

=== Vocal ===
- Andromache (voice and unspecified instruments)
- "Cradle Song" (soprano and harp)
- Joining Cousins (soprano, bassoon and harp)
- O God Our Help in Ages Past (chorus, organ, bells and percussion)
- Psalm 36 (soprano, clarinet and organ)
- Psalm 69 (three part women's voices and harp)
- Songs (barione and piano)
- Songs (soprano and piano)
- Thy Church O God in Ev'ry Age (chorus, organ, bells and percussion)
