= Little Symphony No. 3 (Milhaud) =

1921 composition by Darius Milhaud

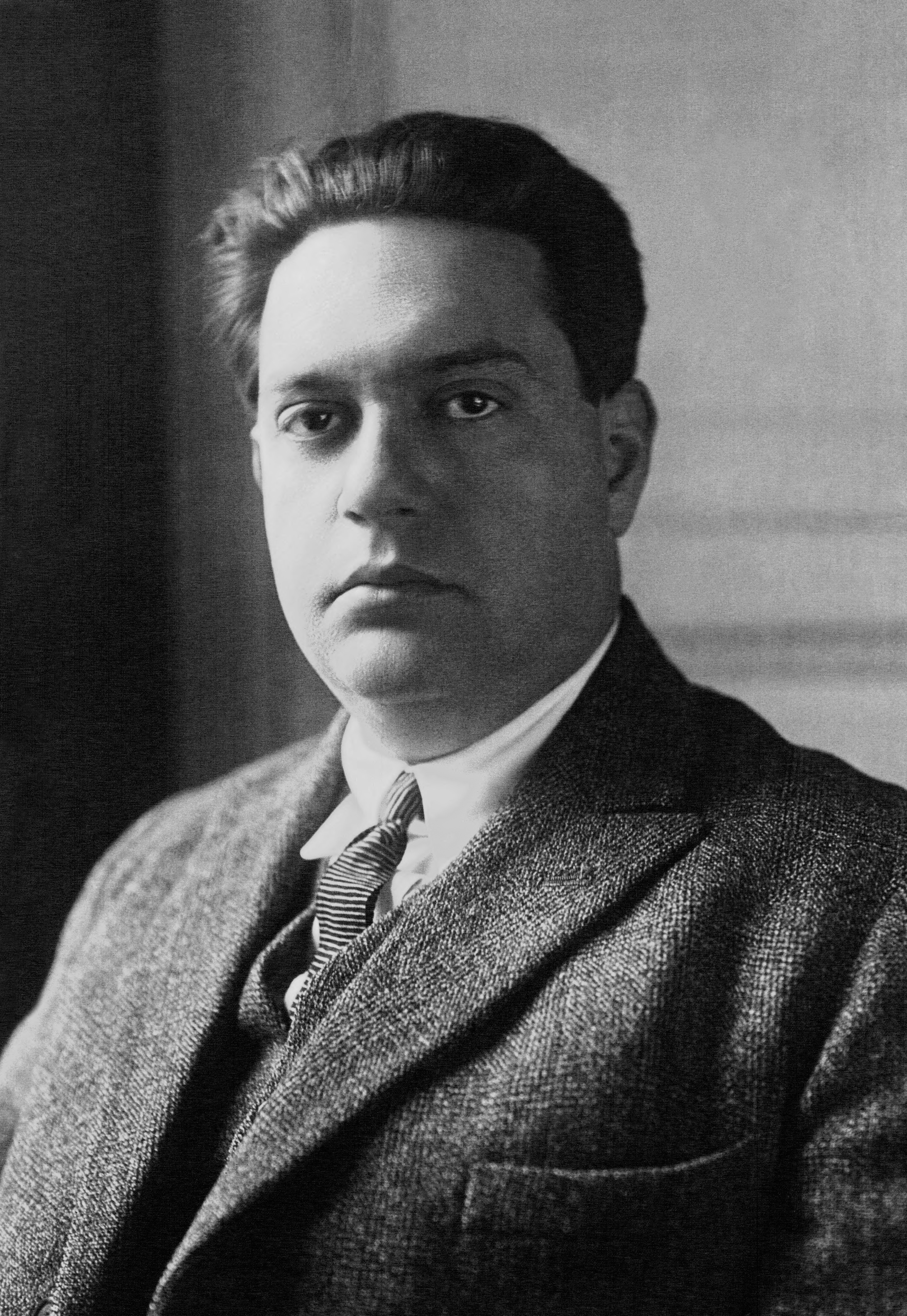
Darius Milhaud in 1923

Little (Chamber) Symphony No. 3, Op. 71 by Darius Milhaud is a work for chamber orchestra that was composed in 1921. The work is also known by the title Sérénade. The work is polytonal, with nearly every instrument playing around a different tonal center, and is also characterized by its fast moving lines, pastoral topoi, and energetic sound.

Milhaud composed this piece in Paris, though he had recently returned from an extended stay in Brazil. His stay in Brazil influenced his music, especially the quickly moving lines in the opening and closing movements, which are reminiscent of the "Brazilian rainforest." This Brazilian influence connects this work to the other works by Milhaud such as Saudades do Brasil and the other Little Symphonies.

Sérénade received its premiere in Paris, by the Société de Musique de Chambre. The score was released by Universal that same year.

== Music ==
The work is a septet for the following instruments: flute, clarinet, bassoon, violin, viola, cello, and double bass. It can be divided into three movements as indicated in the score:

1. Vivement
2. Calme
3. Rondement

It runs a total time of about three minutes and 40 seconds.

The first movement, Vivement, begins with the clarinet and bassoon and then expands to add the strings and flute after four measures. The use of the clarinet lends a unique quality, and the addition of each new instrument adds increasing dissonance and polytonality to the work. The first movement lasts about 75 seconds.

The second movement, Calme, begins with alternating sixteenth note figures in the flute and clarinet, accompanied by pizzicato cello and bass. This segment is marked by its intense chromaticism. The second movement lasts about 85 seconds.

The work ends with Rondement, which returns to the frenzied sound of the work's beginning. The pastoral feeling (aided by the clarinet) returns, having been absent during the Calme. The work builds increasing tension as it approaches the final cadence, finally ending on a B♭ major ninth chord. This movement lasts about 60 seconds.

== Recordings ==
A sample of recordings of this symphony (usually as part of a collection of all six “Little Symphonies”) includes:

- 1967: Orchestra of Radio Luxembourg, conducted by Milhaud himself, released on Candide, re-released in 2007
- 1995: L’Ensemble des Temps Modernes, conducted by Bernard Dekais, released on Cypres
- 2014: Luxembourg Radio Orchestra, conducted by Grant Johannessen, released on Brilliant Classics
