= L'Ours et la Lune =

L'Ours et la Lune (English: The Bear and the Moon) is a play by Paul Claudel, written in April 1917. The music for the play was written by the French composer Darius Milhaud. The play consists of both live acting and puppetry, a novelty at the time it was written; however many performances substituted live actors for the puppets. The play is rarely performed today.

== Background and productions ==
Claudel wrote L'Ours et la Lune while working as the French Minister in Brazil. The post separated him from his wife and children, who remained in France. While in Brazil, Claudel was tasked with disentangling a complicated affair in which French investors had lost millions of Francs in a failed loan investment. The theater professor Yehuda Moraly speculated that Claudel drew inspiration from this affair when writing L'Ours, which features a corrupt financier who defrauds his clients and flees to South America.

The puppets Claudel envisioned for the production were sophisticated; to fulfill its role as written, the Moon puppet needed to be compressible, contain a light which could be turned on and off, and able to wink. Claudel wanted the puppets to be operated by wires from above rather than puppeted by artists below the stage, as he felt that wire-controlled marionettes better represented the spiritual combat associated with the human condition. Claudel struggled to find a production company willing to take on his work. In 1939 the inventor George Lafaye created concept art for puppets and scenery for L'Ours in a neo-cubist style; however there is no evidence that these were ever used.

The first known public performance of the play took place after Claudel's death, at the Théâtre du Kaléidoscope in Paris. The play, directed by Dominique Houdart, opened on September 7, 1966. Houdart later took the play to the théâtre des Célestins in Lyon.

A second, short-lived run of the play was performed at the théâtre des Célestins in March of 1986.

== Characters ==
Actors

- La Lune (The Moon)
- L'Aurore (The Dawn)
- Le prisonnier (The prisoner)

Marionnettes

- La Lune (The Moon)
- L'Ours (The Bear)
- Le Chœr (The Choir)
- L'Aviateur sans pieds (The Footless Aviator)
- Rhodô
- Le Rhabilleur (The Dresser)
- Le Nain Noir (The Black Dwarf)

== Summary ==
=== Scene 1 ===
The play opens in the infirmary of a prison camp in Germany during World War I. A French prisoner of war thinks about his family: his wife, his son Jean, an aviator who was killed in combat, and his orphaned grandchildren. The Moon comes to him and transports him into the world of dreams, where he sees the room of his grandchildren in Hostiaz.

The following scenes take place within the prisoner's dream and are portrayed in a puppet theater.

=== Scene 2 ===
The twin grandchildren of the prisoner are sleeping with a teddy bear called Brelebrun. The Moon (now portrayed by the puppet of an old woman bearing a lantern) talks to the bear, who reveals that he is a corrupt financier who fled to South America after robbing his clients, one of whom was the prisoner from Scene 1. Despite the urging of the moon, Brelebrun refuses to return the stolen money, symbolized by a diamond hidden in the stuffing of his plush body.

The Moon talks about her romantic troubles. A character named the Chorus intervenes to hurry the characters along. The moon reveals that she is in love with an aviator named Paul whose legs were amputated (he is referenced in the play as "the aviator without feet.") Brelebrun, after learning that the Moon is wealthy, offers to help her win Paul's affections.

=== Scene 3 ===
The next scene takes place in a living room. Paul, the amputee, is present, accompanied by a character called "The Dresser;" the Dresser does not contribute meaningfully to the plot but is present in subsequent scenes, observing and smoking his pipe.

The Moon attempts to seduce Paul, who has just received a letter from his fiancée calling off their engagement due to his injury. Brelebrun encourages Paul to accept the affections of the Moon. Paul is revealed to be the brother-in-law of Jean, the deceased son of the prisoner from Scene 1. Jean's orphaned children are now cared for by a women named Rhodô, who was in love with Jean. Paul subsequently becomes enamored with Rhodô, who declines his advances despite the encouragement of Brelebrun.

Learning that Rhodô has savings, Brelebrun tries to con her by encouraging her to make investments in Brazil. After she refuses, he attempts to steal her wallet under the pretext of kissing her. A struggle ensues, and Brelebrun is ripped open, revealing the diamond. The Chorus orders the characters to freeze and retrieves the diamond. The sun rises and the characters flee the stage.

=== Scene 4 ===
The puppets reconvene on a road at the highest point of the hill. Dawn is approaching. Brelebrun, symbolically freed of his attachment to money, finds relief in the loss of the diamond. The Moon reveals that her confession of romantic interest in Paul was merely a ploy to separate Brelebrun from the diamond, which the financier could not bring himself to part with on his own. Rhodô and the Chorus teach the amputee Paul to float in the air. A car arrives, driven by a black drawf. The characters enter the car and are taken to "the other world," with the exception of the Dresser, who remains on the hill smoking his pipe.

=== Scene 5 ===
The prisoner awakens in the infirmary of the prison camp and is dismayed to return to the captivity of his waking life. The Dawn appears and removes the veils in which he is cloaked. The prisoner remarks that a new day has started.

== Themes ==
The theater professor Yehuda Moraly notes that, though ostensibly written for children, L'Ours et la Lune has a decidedly grim premise, being the dream of a dying prisoner. This is echoed in the lines of the play itself, with the Choir at one point remarking that "...Il n'ya rien que les enfants détestent comme les histoires qui sont faites exprès for eux" ("there is nothing that children hate more than stories that are written just for them.")

Moraly notes that the story contains three "levels" of theater: the initial framing of the moribund prisoner, the World of Dreams into which the Moon invites the airman, and the fiction-within-the-fiction that she creates to separate Brelebrun from the diamond. He proposes that the Moon represents the theater itself; Brelebrun, burdened by greed, is a stand-in for capitalism, while the kindly, energetic, and future-oriented Rhodô represents the proletariat.

The theater profressor Sever Martinot-Lagarde draws a parallel between Brelebrun and Paul, noting that both characters find solace in the virtue of renunciation; the teddy bear is symbolically freed from his obsession with wealth while Paul is freed when he relinquishes his desire for romantic love.

Martinot-Lararde writes:

"In L’Ours, the pranks fit together in trompe-l’oeil. It’s about mocking an old moon in love with a young airman with a war wound, unless it’s tricking a teddy bear, who plays a crooked banker, to force him to return stolen money to orphans. But isn’t it more about encouraging the footless Aviator to renounce his love for a young woman who loves another? Both plays depict the earthly illusions, the disappointments of love and the pranks of God in which men are victims. If Protée [another of Claudel's plays] flouts all material desires and celebrates the forces of life and freedom, L’Ours is an invitation to detachment and inner liberation."

== Adaptations and homages ==
The French composer Jean Cartan composed Ouverture pour l'ours et la lune, de Claudel (English: overture to Claudel's The Bear and the Moon.)

The French children's book L'Ours et la Lune by Cécile Alix and Antoine Guilloppé, is unrelated to Claudel's play.
