= Sonata for flute, oboe, clarinet and piano (Milhaud) =

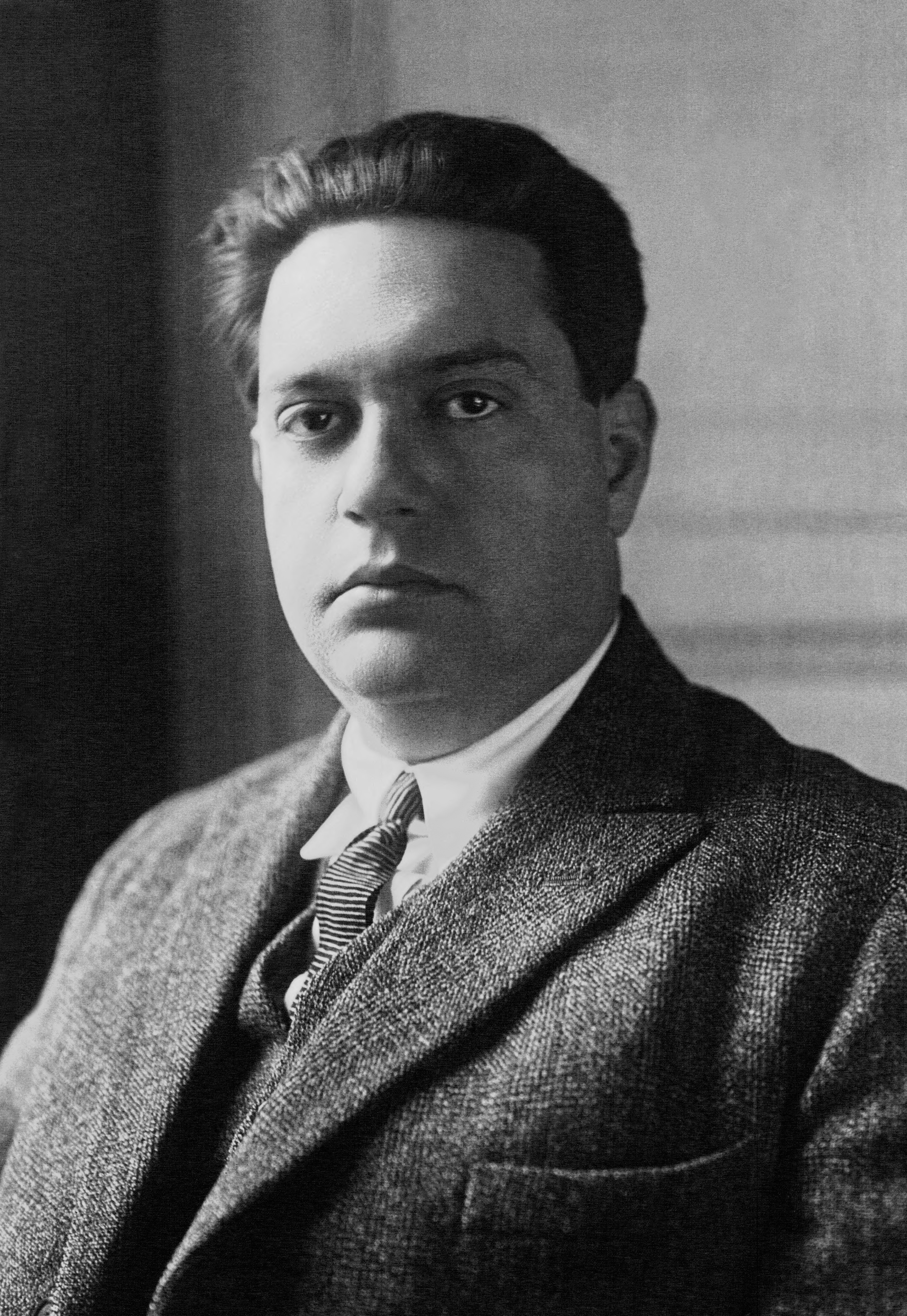
Darius Milhaud in 1923

Darius Milhaud's Sonata for flute, oboe, clarinet and piano was composed in 1918. Written immediately after the Fourth String Quartet, it is a true quartet for winds and piano. It lasts approximately 18 minutes and consists of four movements, ending in an emotional slow finale.

1. Tranquille
2. Joyeux
3. Emporté
4. Douloureux
