= Pacem in terris (Milhaud) =

Choral symphony by Darius Milhaud

Pacem in terris, Op. 404 is a choral symphony for alto, baritone, chorus and orchestra by French composer Darius Milhaud. Though often identified only by its title and opus number, it is considered Milhaud's thirteenth and last symphony. The piece was written in 1963, incorporating text written by Pope John XXIII in his encyclical of the same year, which began with the words that Milhaud used as his title. At least a partial recording of this symphony is available on the Musique En Wallonie label, featuring the Brussels Belgian Radio and TV Philharmonic Orchestra conducted by Franz André.

Milhaud conducted the premiere in Paris on December 20, 1963. The American premiere performance and world premiere recording occurred in Salt Lake City, Utah, during the 1964-65 concert year, performed by the Utah Symphony Orchestra and the University of Utah Choruses, with Maurice Abravanel conducting and with the composer present.
