= Sacred Service (Milhaud) =

The Sacred Service for the Sabbath Morning is a piece of religious music written by Darius Milhaud on a 1948 commission from the Congregation Emanu-El Synagogue in San Francisco. It is a composition for baritone soloist, narrator (speaking), choir, and orchestra. The choral text is in Hebrew, that of the narrator in Hebrew and English.

It is one of the two musical compositions that include the Hebrew liturgy of an entire prayer service, the other being Ernest Bloch's Avodath Hakodesh, a work commissioned by the same synagogue.

The composer, himself of Jewish origin and having composed other Jewish-inspired works, used the Provençal Rite as the foundation of the work. Saturday morning prayer not being universal, secondary parts were added for Friday evening prayers, making for easier use.

The premiere took place on May 18, 1949 with the University of California, Berkeley Chorus and San Francisco Symphony under Milhaud's direction.

The work is made up of four parts, a performance taking a little less than an hour.

- Part I
  - Ma tovu
  - Bar'khu
  - Sh'ma
  - V'ahavta
  - Mi khamokha
  - Tzur yisrael
  - Eternal is thy power (Narrator)
  - K'dusha
- Part II
  - Prayer and response
  - Silent Prayer
  - Yihyu l'ratzon
- Part III : Torah
  - S'u sh'arim
  - Taking the scroll from the ark
  - Returning the scroll to the ark
  - The law of the Lord is perfect (Narrator)
  - Etz Hayyim
- Part IV
  - Adoration
  - Va'anahnu
  - Universal Prayer
  - Mourners kaddish (Narrator)
  - Mourners kaddish (Choir)
  - Adon Olam
  - Benediction
- Additional Prayers
  - L'kha dodi
  - Mi Khamokha
  - V'sham'ru
  - Eloheinu velohei avoteinu r'tze
  - Yism'hu
