= Scaramouche (Milhaud) =

1937 musical suite by Darius Milhaud

- Suite by Darius Milhaud
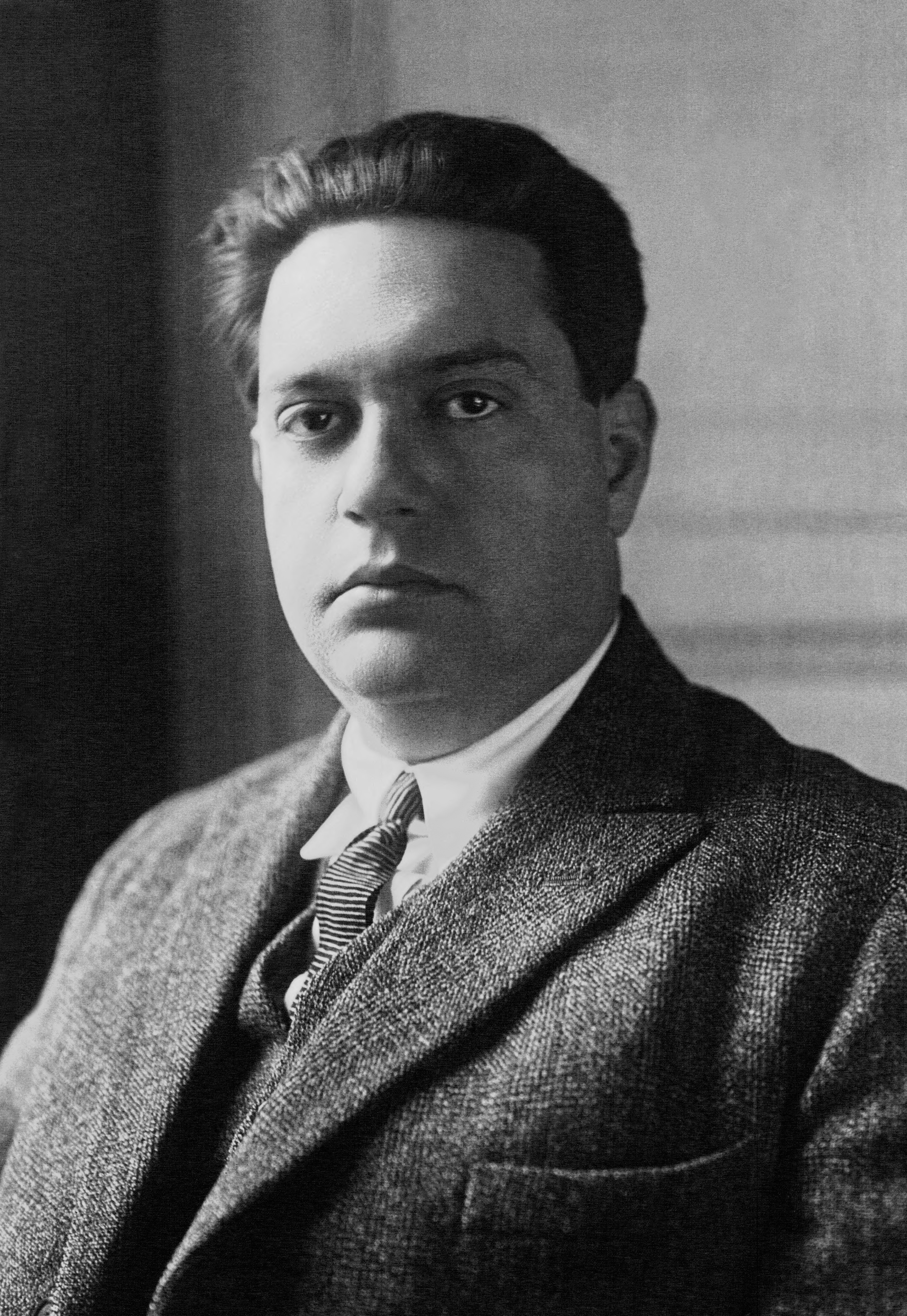
- Milhaud in 1923
- Opus: 165
- Publisher: Raymond Deiss
- Movements: three

Premiere
- Date: 1 July 1937
- Location: Exposition Internationale des Arts et Techniques dans la Vie Moderne
- Performers: Marcelle Meyer and Ida Jankelevitch

Scaramouche, Op. 165, (Note: The original piano duo of Scaramouche is designated Op.165b, while the saxophone and clarinet arrangements are designated Op.165c and Op.165d respectively.) is a suite composed by Darius Milhaud in 1937. The suite is based on incidental music Milhaud wrote for two theatrical productions: Le Médecin volant and Bolivar. Scaramouche draws inspiration from various sources, with each of the suite's three movements being of a distinct character. Milhaud's characteristic use of polytonality can be heard throughout the piece.

Scaramouche, which originally composed for saxophone and piano but not premiered as such, was arranged as a piano duo in 1937 at the request of Marguerite Long and was premiered at the Exposition internationale des arts et des techniques dans la vie moderne the same year. The suite was later arranged for various ensembles due to the piece's popularity, including arrangements for solo clarinet with orchestra at the request of the clarinettist Benny Goodman.

== Background ==
The music in Scaramouche is taken from incidental music that Milhaud composed for two plays. The first and third movements are inspired by themes composed for Henri Pascar's production of an adaptation of Molière's Le Médecin volant (The Flying Doctor); it is from here that Scaramouche gets its name, as Pascar's group of players was named the Théatre Scaramouche. The second movement takes its theme from music Milhaud composed in 1936 for Jules Supervielle's opera, Bolivar. Although he did not use any of the 1936 themes for the final score, Milhaud later decided to repurpose the original overture for Scaramouche.

== Composition and publishing ==
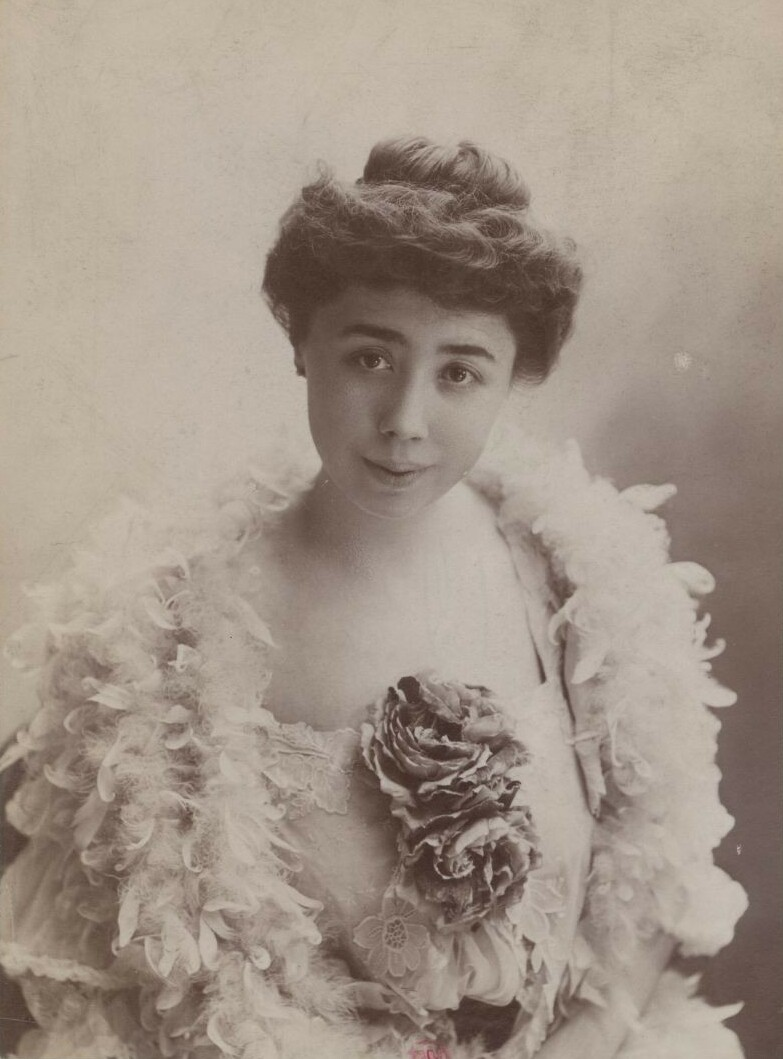
Marguerite Long (pictured c. 1900) asked Milhaud to compose Scaramouche

In 1937, the French pianist Marguerite Long asked Milhaud to compose a piano duo for two of her students (Marcelle Meyer and Ida Jankelevitch) to play at the Exposition internationale des arts et des techniques dans la vie moderne. In response, Milhaud arranged Scaramouche, which was yet an unperformed piece written for the alto saxophone and piano. Although it largely used music that Milhaud had composed previously, composing the suite did not come easy to him.

Scaramouche was published by Milhaud's friend, the printer Raymond Deiss, who requested to do so. Milhaud attempted to deter Deiss from publishing the suite, assuming that the music would not sell and prove a wasted investment—at the time printed sheet music was proving unpopular. Deiss refused to be dissuaded by Milhaud and proceeded to print the first edition.

Milhaud wrote about Scaramouche's publishing in his autobiography, Ma vie heureuse (My Happy Life):

At once publisher Deiss offered to publish it. I advised him against it, saying that no one would want to buy it. But he was an original character who only published works that he liked. He happened to like Scaramouche and insisted on having his way. In the event he was right, for while sales of printed music were everywhere encountering difficulties, several printings were made.

Milhaud recorded that Diess took a special delight in telling him, "The Americans are asking for 500 copies and 1000 are being asked for elsewhere". After his immigration to America during World War II, Milhaud had Scaramouche republished in the United States.

== Structure and music ==
External videos
- Jean-Yves Thibaudet performs Op.165b with Ray Ushikubo, Nathan Lee and Aidan Mikdad
- YouTube video of performance

Scaramouche consists of three movements:

1. Vif (C major, 4/4)
2. Modéré (B♭ major, 4/4)
3. Brazileira (F major, 2/4)

A full playing of the suite lasts approximately eight to nine minutes. Polytonality, a distinctive element of Milhaud's composing style, is used consistently throughout the suite.

=== I. Vif ===
The first movement of Scaramouche has been likened to a cross between folk-song melodies and nursery rhymes: one of the themes used is the melody from the children's song Ten Green Bottles. Vif is written ternary (ABA) form.

Polytonality can be heard as early as the opening measures, where chromatically clashing triads are layered under the movement's opening theme, which is in C major. The technique features again in measure 24, where a melody in the key of G major is played over an accompaniment in the original key of C major.

Syncopation is another technique used in Vif. In a section beginning at measure nine, the bass line places emphasis on the first, fourth and seventh quaver beats of a bar. This rhythm is known as tresillo. A few measures later, Milhaud uses a three-against-four polymeter. This kind of syncopation was often used by Brazilian composers, including Heitor Villa-Lobos.

=== II. Modéré ===
The second movement hints at the French overture style, used by Johann Sebastian Bach and other Baroque composers. The movement has elements of canon and ostinato. Modéré is also in ternary form: the A section is written in 4/4 and is contrasted metrically by a B section in 6/8. In the final section of the movement, Milhaud layers both the A and B themes on top of each other.

In Modéré, Milhaud uses dotted rhythms and arpeggios to create a melody that takes cues from folk song. The saxophonist Jason Stone suggests that this movement was also inspired by Brazilian music, noting Modéré's similarities to the modinha and lundu.

=== III. Brazileira ===
Brazileira's tempo is marked as "Mouvement de samba". The movement is a samba choro inspired by Milhaud's prior time in Brazil: he had spent two years in Rio de Janeiro serving as secretary to the French ambassador Paul Claudel during the First World War. During this time, he listened to the music of Ernesto Nazareth, which served as an inspiration to the third movement.

There is a diversity of opinions regarding Brazileira's structure: musicologist Hyejeong Seong asserts that it is written in ABCA form, while Jason Stone refers to this movement as a "theme and variations in fast samba". Other papers analyse the movement as ternary form.

Brazileira uses syncopation in a similar way to Vif. Tresillo rhythms are again present in the movement's A section. In addition, Milhaud uses rhythmic anticipation of downbeats (using semiquavers) to evoke a samba feeling. Following the more songlike B and C sections, the syncopated tresillo rhythms return in the last section of the suite.

== Arrangements ==
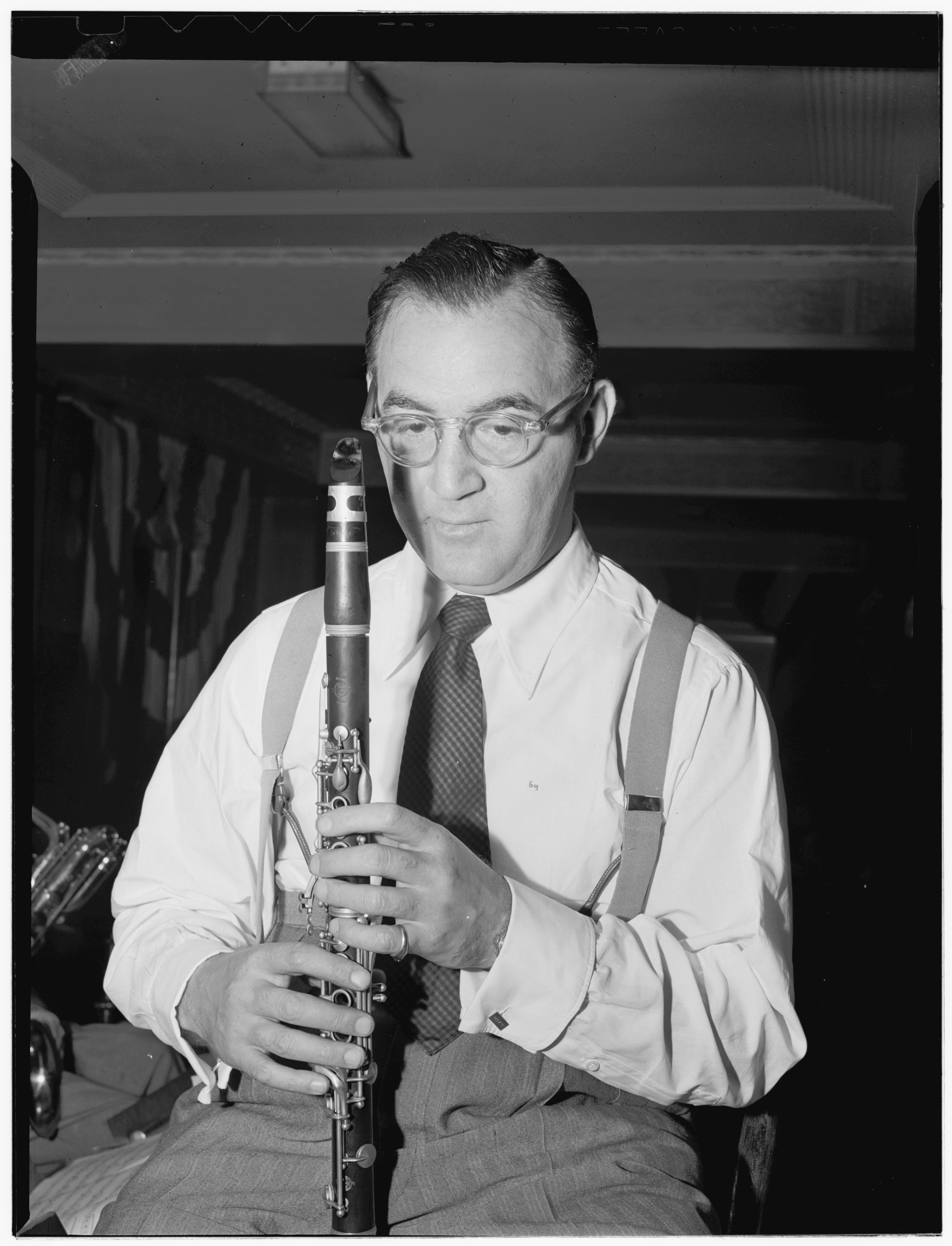
Benny Goodman asked Milhaud to arrange Scaramouche for clarinet

The first published version of Scaramouche was written as a piano duo (Op.165b) in 1937. Due to the suite's popularity, Milhaud later arranged it for various different ensembles. During this time the original composition featuring the alto saxophone and orchestra/piano (Op.165c) (Note: There appears to be some controversy around this date, as indicated in Eugene Rousseau's interview with Marcel Mule in Marcel Mule, His Life and the Saxophone.) was published in 1939 by Éditions Salabert. This arrangement was one of only two pieces that Milhaud wrote for saxophone and piano, the other being his 1954 composition Danse.

On the request of the clarinettist Benny Goodman and his teacher Eric Simon, Milhaud arranged the piece for B♭ clarinet and orchestra/piano (Op.165d, published 1941 by Éditions Salabert). In letters written between Milhaud and Goodman, Milhaud writes that the clarinet part was created by transposing the existing saxophone arrangement. He had refused Simon's suggestion of transposing orchestral parts, stating that it would be impossible to do without a complete rewrite of the piece. Goodman was said to prefer the arrangement of Scaramouche over Milhaud's more difficult Concerto for Clarinet, which was written specifically for him.

Other composers have arranged Scaramouche as well. Arrangements exist for wind band (Joseph Willcox Jenkins), violin and piano (Jascha Heifetz), saxophone and wind quintet (Don Stewart), guitar trio and a group of 12 saxophones.

== Performances ==
On 1 July 1937, Scaramouche was premiered at the Exposition internationale des arts et des techniques dans la vie moderne by French pianists Marcelle Meyer and Ida Jankelevitch.

A. Muhle (Note: A significant amount of sources state that the performer was the similarly named saxophonist Marcel Mule.) premiered the arrangement for saxophone and orchestra in June 1940 with the Radio Paris Orchestra. The performance was later aired on Radio Paris. Op.165c was premiered in the United States in November 1940 by the Northern California WPA Symphony Orchestra.

The arrangement for clarinet and orchestra was premiered in New York by Benny Goodman in 1941.

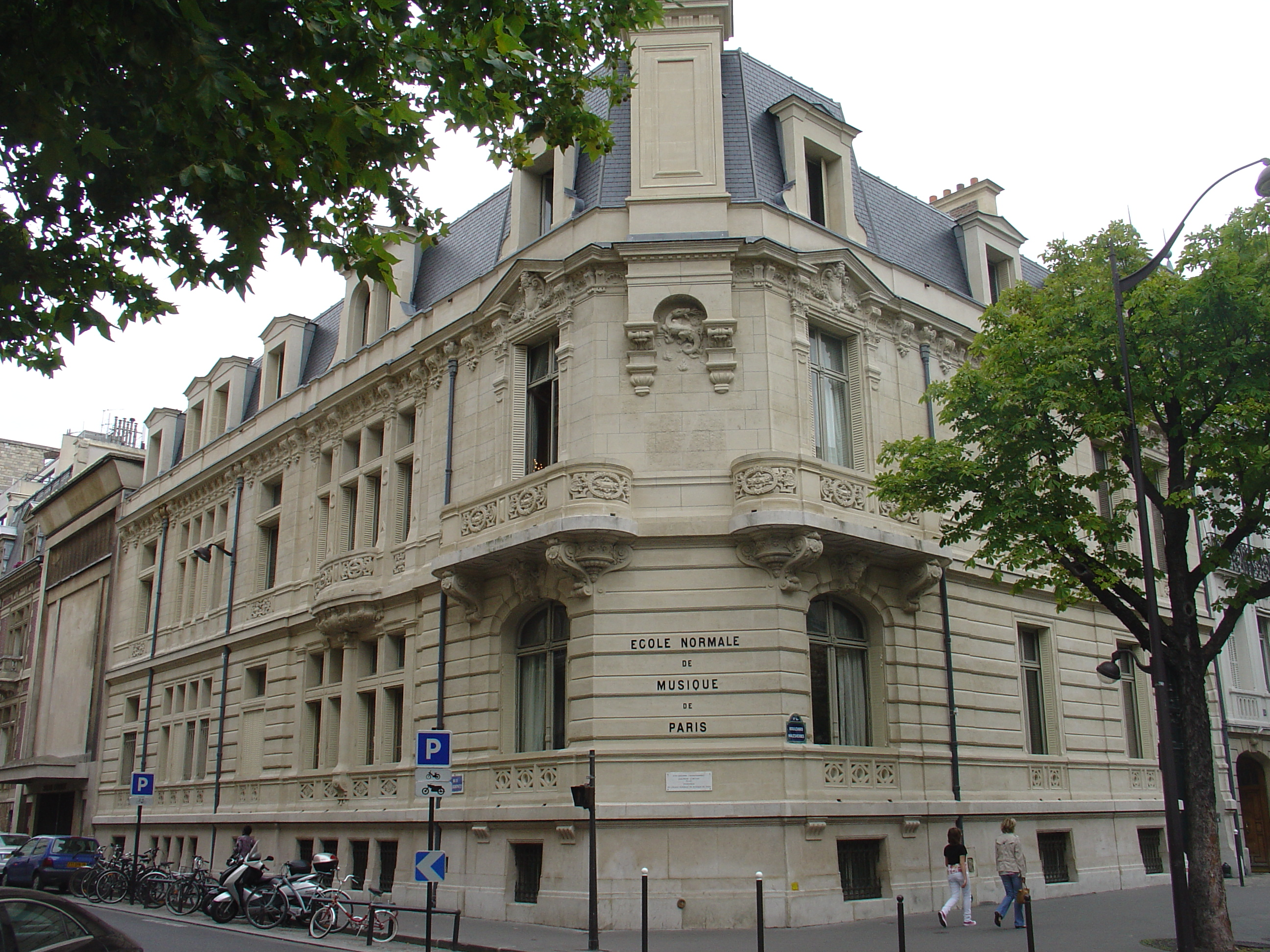
The École Normale de Musique de Paris

During the Nazi censorship of works by Jewish individuals, Scaramouche (along with Milhaud's other works) was banned. Undeterred by the censorship, Marcelle Meyer, alongside another pianist, organised a performance of Scaramouche on 1 June 1943 at the École Normale de Musique de Paris. To evade the ban on Milhaud's works, the performers were forced to attempt to trick the censors. The pianists used anagrams to provide a pseudonym for both Milhaud and the suite; they changed Darius Milhaud to become Hamid-al-Usurid while Scaramouche was changed to be Mous Are-chac. The performance managed to successfully take place, avoiding any censorship from the Nazi authorities.

Saxophonist Jess Gillam played the piece on the last night of the 2018 BBC Proms with the BBC Symphony Orchestra conducted by Sir Andrew Davis. Her performance was the first time the piece had been played at the Proms and was received well by audiences and critics. BBC reporter Mark Savage said it was "the indisputable highlight of the Last Night of the Proms", while The Telegraphs' Ivan Hewett called it "a sassy but also subtly moulded performance of Milhaud’s delightful Scaramouche".

== Reception ==
Audiences of the time received Scaramouche very well, which surprised Milhaud. The piece was a large success for Milhaud and continues to be one of his most popular works. Scaramouche has become a standard piece in both piano duo and classical saxophone repertoire; according to musicologist Paul Collaer, the suite "has earned itself an incomparably popular place in twentieth-century two-piano literature". In a 1970 interview, Milhaud stated that he considered Scaramouche to be one of his most successful pieces but said it was "a work that is not important". He believed that the suite did not deserve to be so popular as to the point of overshadowing some of his other compositions. The New York Times included Scaramouche on a 1974 list of "Milhaud's Major Works".

== Recordings ==
Title	Performer(s)	Label	Opus	Year	Ref(s)
Scaramouche (Note: This recording was later re-released for EMI Classics' "Composers in Person" series under the name Milhaud plays and conducts Milhaud.)	Darius Milhaud and Marcelle Meyer	EMI Classics	165b	1938	
Untitled	Jean-Marie Londeix	Vendôme	165c	1960	
Milhaud Jazz Works	Claude and Ian Hobson	Arabesque	165b	1986	
Untitled	Katia and Marielle Labèque	Philips	165b	1989	
Saxofolies	Paul Wehage	EPM Musique	165c	1990	
Hot sax	Jürgen Demmler and Peter Grabinger	Bayer Records	165c	1992	
Milhaud	Stephen Coombs and Artur Pizarro	Hyperion	165b	1998	
French Romance	Anthony & Joseph Paratore	Four Winds	165b	2001	
Under the Sign of the Sun	Claude Delangle	BIS	165c	2007	
Untitled	Sabine Meyer and Oleg Maisenberg	EMI Classics	165d	2007	
Works for Two Pianos	Martha Argerich and Gabriele Baldocci	Dynamic	165b	2013	
Rise	Jess Gillam	Decca Classics	165c	2019	
Scaramouche	D&B Piano Duo - Dubravka Vukalovic & Bruno Vlahek	Vox Primus	165b	2020	

== Notes, references and sources ==
=== Sources ===
- Clark, David Lindsey (1999). Appraisals of Original Wind Music: A Survey and Guide. Greenwood Publishing Group. ISBN 978-0-313-30906-9.
- Dallin, Leon (1982). Listener's guide to musical understanding. Dubuque, Iowa: W.C. Brown Co. ISBN 978-0-697-03487-8 – via Internet Archive.
- Etheridge, Kathryn Diane (2008). Classical Saxophone Transcriptions: Role and Reception (master's thesis). Florida State University.
- Hinson, Maurice (9 July 2001). Music for More than One Piano: An Annotated Guide. Indiana University Press. ISBN 978-0-253-11306-1.
- James, Matthew (8 August 1997). "A Most Savory Cocktail: Milhaud's Scaramouche as an Assemblage of Compositional Techniques". Ohio University.
- Kelly, Barbara L. (2013). Music and Ultra-modernism in France: A Fragile Consensus, 1913-1939. Boydell & Brewer Ltd. ISBN 978-1-84383-810-4.
- Maher, Erin K. (2016). Darius Milhaud in the United States, 1940–71: Transatlantic Constructions of Musical Identity (PhD thesis). University of North Carolina. doi:10.17615/e1bz-3a74.
- McFarland, Mark (August 2009). "Dave Brubeck and Polytonal Jazz". Jazz Perspectives. 3 (2): 153–176. doi:10.1080/17494060903152396. ISSN 1749-4060. S2CID 191524027.
- Milhaud, Darius; Breitrose, Henry (1970). "Conversation with Milhaud". Music Educators Journal. 56 (7): 55–56. doi:10.2307/3392748. ISSN 0027-4321. JSTOR 3392748. S2CID 143737158.
- Milhaud, Darius (1998). Ma vie heureuse (in French). Zurfluh. ISBN 978-2-87750-083-8.
- Palmer, Christopher (1972). "Milhaud at 80". The Musical Times. 113 (1555): 861–863. doi:10.2307/957364. ISSN 0027-4666. JSTOR 957364.
- Robison, Forrest (1967). "the two-piano music of Darius Milhaud". American Music Teacher. 16 (5): 26–43. ISSN 0003-0112. JSTOR 43537130.
- Seong, Hyejeong (2019). Latin American Influences on Selected Piano Pieces by Louis Moreau Gottschalk and Darius Milhaud (PhD thesis). West Virginia University. doi:10.33915/etd.7429.
- Simeone, Nigel (2000). "Messiaen and the Concerts de la Pléiade: 'A Kind of Clandestine Revenge against the Occupation'". Music & Letters. 81 (4): 551–584. doi:10.1093/ml/81.4.551. ISSN 0027-4224. JSTOR 854539.
- Stone, Jason Alexander (August 1999). Brazilian influences on Milhaud's Scaramouche, Op. 165 (master's thesis). University of California.
- Umble, James (1999). Jean-Marie Londeix Master of the Modern Saxophone. Carl Fischer Music. ISBN 978-0-313-30906-9.
- Van Regenmorter, Paula (2009). Brazilian music for saxophone : a survey of solo and small chamber works. UMI Dissertation Services. pp. 57–61. OCLC 642833637.
- Votta, Michael (2003). The Wind Band and Its Repertoire: Two Decades of Research As Published in the CBDNA Journal. Alfred Music. ISBN 978-1-4574-4996-3.
