= André de Richaud =

French poet and writer

- Born: 6 April 1907; Perpignan, France
- Died: 29 September 1968 (aged 61); Montpellier, France
- Occupations: Poet, writer, playwright, essayist
- Writing career
- Language: French
- Years active: 1927-1968
- Genres: Novels, poetry, plays, essays
- Notable work: Pain
- Notable awards: Prix Guillaume Apollinaire (1954)

André de Richaud (6 April 1907 in Perpignan – 29 September 1968 in Montpellier) was a French poet and writer. After his father was killed in the First World War in 1915, his mother became a lover of a German prisoner of war, which caused him a trauma that made him later sell their house and move away. At the age of twenty he wrote an autobiographical novel Pain (whose heroine's impact on her son's life seems similar to the impact of the stepfather on the life of Baudelaire) which greatly influenced Albert Camus. He was awarded the 1954 Prix Guillaume Apollinaire.

His works include novels, poetry, plays and essays. Despite being successful (his friends included Jean Giraudoux, André Gide, Jean Cocteau, Fernand Léger, Luis Buñuel, Jean Marais and Léon-Paul Fargue), he could never come to terms with the world (which is typical for a poète maudit), and became addicted to alcohol and drugs. He died in a hospital, self-destructed, paralyzed and penniless, but in his words "thankfully surrounded by friends - children and dogs."

== Works ==
"J'ai cru tricher, et l'on m'a triché : croyant avoir deux figures, je n'en ai plus." / "I thought that I was creating delusions, but I was deluded myself: I thought I had two personalities, and I have none."

- Vie de saint Delteil, (1928)
- La Création du monde, (1930)
- La Douleur, (1930); Pain
- La Fontaine des lunatiques, (1932)
- Le Village, (1932)
- Le Château des papes, (1933)
- L'Amour fraternel, (1936)
- Le Droit d'asile, (1937)
- La Barrette rouge, (1938)
- Le Mauvais, (1945)
- La Rose de Noël, (1947)
- L'Étrange Visiteur, (1956)
- Je ne suis pas mort, (1965)
