= Henri Hoppenot =

French diplomat

4th Commissioner-General of French Indochina
- In office April 1955 – 21 July 1956
- President: René Coty
- Preceded by: Paul Ély
- Succeeded by: Position abolished

Permanent Representative of France to the United Nations
- In office 1952–1955
- President: Vincent Auriol; René Coty
- Preceded by: Jean Chauvel
- Succeeded by: Hervé Alphand

Ambassador of France to Switzerland
- In office 1945–1952
- President: Chairman of the Provisional Government: Charles de Gaulle; Félix Gouin; Georges Bidault; Vincent Auriol; Léon Blum; President: Vincent Auriol

Personal details
- Born: 25 October 1891 Paris, French Third Republic
- Died: 10 August 1977 (aged 85) Paris, French Fifth Republic
- Spouse: Hélène Delacour

Henri Hoppenot (French pronunciation: [ɑ̃ʁi ɔpno]; 25 October 1891 – 10 August 1977) was a French diplomat and the last commissioner-general in Indochina (1955–1956). He also served as the French president of the United Nations Security Council from 1952 to 1955.

In August 1914, he started in the Press Office of the Department of Foreign Affairs. He became friends with Alexis Leger (later Saint-John Perse, who would maintain a friendship of more than sixty years. When they entered the ministry, there had already been diplomat-writers: Jean Giraudoux, Paul Morand and Paul Claudel.

He was a librettist for Darius Milhaud.

In 1917, he was an attaché at the Embassy of France in Berne. He married Helena Delacour.

In 1938, he was a deputy director of the Europe division at the French Ministry of Foreign Affairs.

In 1940, he was a minister plenipotentiary at Montevideo.

He rallied to Free France and headed the civil service of the military mission in Washington, DC.

In 1943, he was a delegate of the Provisional Government of the Republic to the United States. From 1945 to 1952, he was the ambassador of France in Bern after eight months of a vacancy. He aimed to restore confidence between the two countries, aided by the consul general of France in Geneva, Xavier de Gaulle, who served from 1944 to 1953. In 1951, he was an honorary member of the Museum of Fine Arts Bern.

From 1952 to 1955, he was the permanent representative of France to the UN Security Council.

From 1955 to 1956, he was the commissioner-general of France in Indochina.

From 1956 to 1964, he was a member of the French Council of State.

Together with his wife, Hélène, who was an accomplished photographer, he produced the book Extrême-Orient (Ides et Calendes, 1951) with photos taken in the Far East. (Hélène Hoppenot's photography book on Tunisia is ISBN 9973855043)
