= Saudades do Brasil =

1920 suite for piano (later arranged for orchestra) by Darius Milhaud

Example of polytonality or extended tonality from Milhaud's Saudades do Brasil (1920), right hand in B major and left hand in G major, or both hands in extended G major.

The Saudades do Brasil (1920), Op. 67, are a suite of twelve dances for piano by Darius Milhaud. Composed after Milhaud's visit to Brazil in 1917-1918, each dance is based on a duple tango or samba rhythm and bears the name of a place or neighborhood in Rio de Janeiro. The title of the suite uses the Portuguese term saudade. In 1921 Milhaud arranged the suite for orchestra (op. 67b).

The work is well known for its use of polytonality, though sections may also be considered extended tonality or, "harmonic color".

There exists a transcription for orchestra by the composer with a brief added overture.

== Sections ==
1. Sorocaba (dedicated to Madame Regis de Oliveira)
2. Botafogo (dedicated to Oswald Guerra)
3. Leme (dedicated to Nininha Velloso-Guerra)
4. Copacabana (dedicated to Godofredo Leão Velloso)
5. Ipanema (dedicated to Arthur Rubinstein)
6. Gávea (dedicated to Madame Henrique Oswald)
7. Corcovado (dedicated to Madame Henri Hoppenot)
8. Tijuca (dedicated to Ricardo Viñes)
9. Sumaré (dedicated to Henri Hoppenot)
10. Paineiras (dedicated to La Baronne Frachon)
11. Laranjeiras (dedicated to Audrey Parr)
12. Paysandu (dedicated to Paul Claudel)
