= Alun Francis =

Welsh conductor

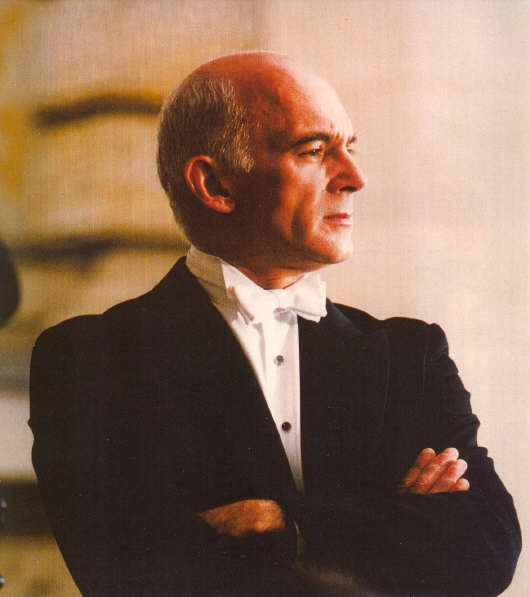
- Alun Francis in 2007
- Born: 29 September 1943
- Occupation: Conductor
- Organizations: Ulster Orchestra; Nordwestdeutsche Philharmonie; Orquesta Filarmónica de la UNAM

Alun Francis (born 29 September 1943) is a Welsh conductor.

== Career ==
Francis was the principal conductor of the Ulster Orchestra from 1966 for ten years. In 1978 he conducted the premiere of Donizetti's opera Gabriella di Vergy in the Queen Elizabeth Hall in London.

From 1979 to 1985 he was Music director of the Northwest Chamber Orchestra in Seattle, then he was artistic counselor of the ensembles Opera Forum in Enschede.

From 1987 to 1990 he was Generalmusikdirektor of the Nordwestdeutsche Philharmonie. Afterwards he conducted the Haydn-Orchester in Bolzano, the Berliner Symphoniker and the Orchestra Sinfonica di Milano Giuseppe Verdi. From 2003 to 2008 he was principal conductor of the Thüringen Philharmonie Gotha. He has been a regular guest conductor of the Zagreb Philharmonic Orchestra. As of 2010, he was principal conductor of the Orquesta Filarmónica de la UNAM in Mexico City.

== Discography ==
Francis recorded works of Francis Poulenc, symphonies and symphonic works of Otto Klemperer with the Staatsphilharmonie Rheinland-Pfalz, and symphonies of Allan Pettersson with different orchestras, among others. In 1980 he recorded Offenbach's operetta Robinson Crusoé with the Royal Philharmonic Orchestra. In 2000 he was awarded the first prize of the Cannes Classical Award in the category CD premiere for his recording of the complete symphonies of Darius Milhaud with the Sinfonieorchester Basel. He conducted a recording of Carl Reinecke's four piano concertos with pianist Klaus Hellwig and the Nordwestdeutsche Philharmonie. He is the only conductor to have recorded – with the BBC Scottish Symphony Orchestra for the CPO label – all five symphonies by the English composer Humphrey Searle.
