= Sinfonieorchester Basel =

Symphony orchestra based in Basel, Switzerland

- Orchestra
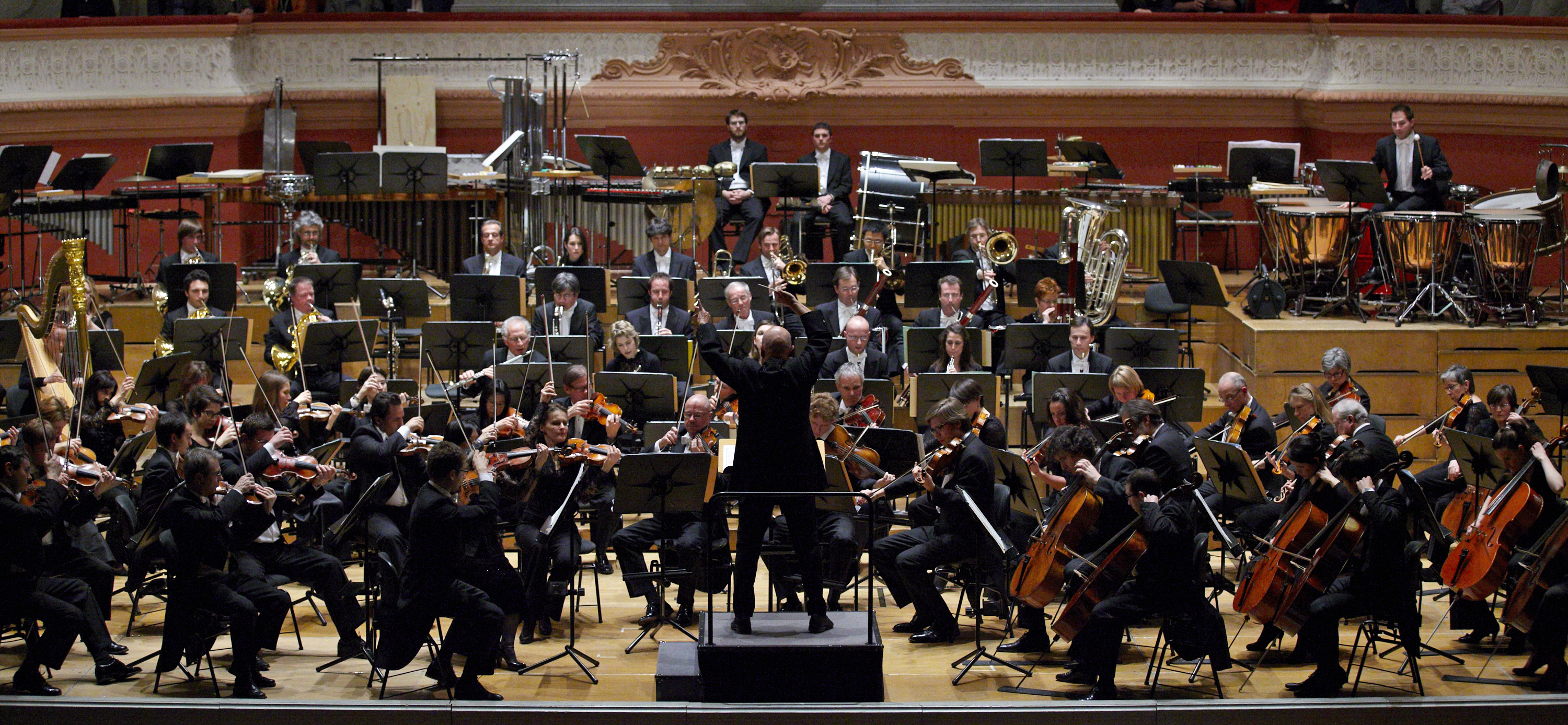
- The Sinfonieorchester Basel in 2012
- Founded: 1876; 150 years ago
- Location: Basel, Switzerland
- Concert hall: Musiksaal, Stadtcasino
- Principal conductor: Markus Poschner

The Sinfonieorchester Basel (Symphony Orchestra Basel; Swiss abbreviation SOB) is a symphony orchestra based in Basel, Switzerland. Its principal concert venue is the Musiksaal of the Stadtcasino. In addition, the orchestra accompanies ballet and opera productions with Theater Basel.

== History ==
The orchestra was founded in 1876. During its history, the orchestra gave the world premieres of works by such composers as Béla Bartók, Arthur Honegger and Bohuslav Martinů. The orchestra holds its present name Sinfonieorchester Basel since 1997, when the two orchestras Basler Sinfonie-Orchester and Radio Sinfonieorchester merged into one ensemble. Another milestone in the history of the orchestra was set in 2012, when the Sinfonieorchester Basel and the organizer of many years AMG (in German Allgemeine Musikgesellschaft Basel) decided to go separate ways. Henceforward, the Sinfonieorchester Basel has been organizing its own subscription concerts.

From 2009 to 2016, the orchestra's chief conductor was Dennis Russell Davies. In June 2015, the orchestra announced the appointment of Ivor Bolton as its next chief conductor, as of the 2016–2017 season, with an initial contract of four years. Michał Nesterowicz became the orchestra's principal guest conductor as of the 2016–2017 season. Bolton concluded his tenure as chief conductor of the orchestra at the close of the 2024–2025 season. In February 2023, the orchestra announced the appointment of Markus Poschner as its next chief conductor, effective with the 2025–2026 season.

== Chief conductors ==
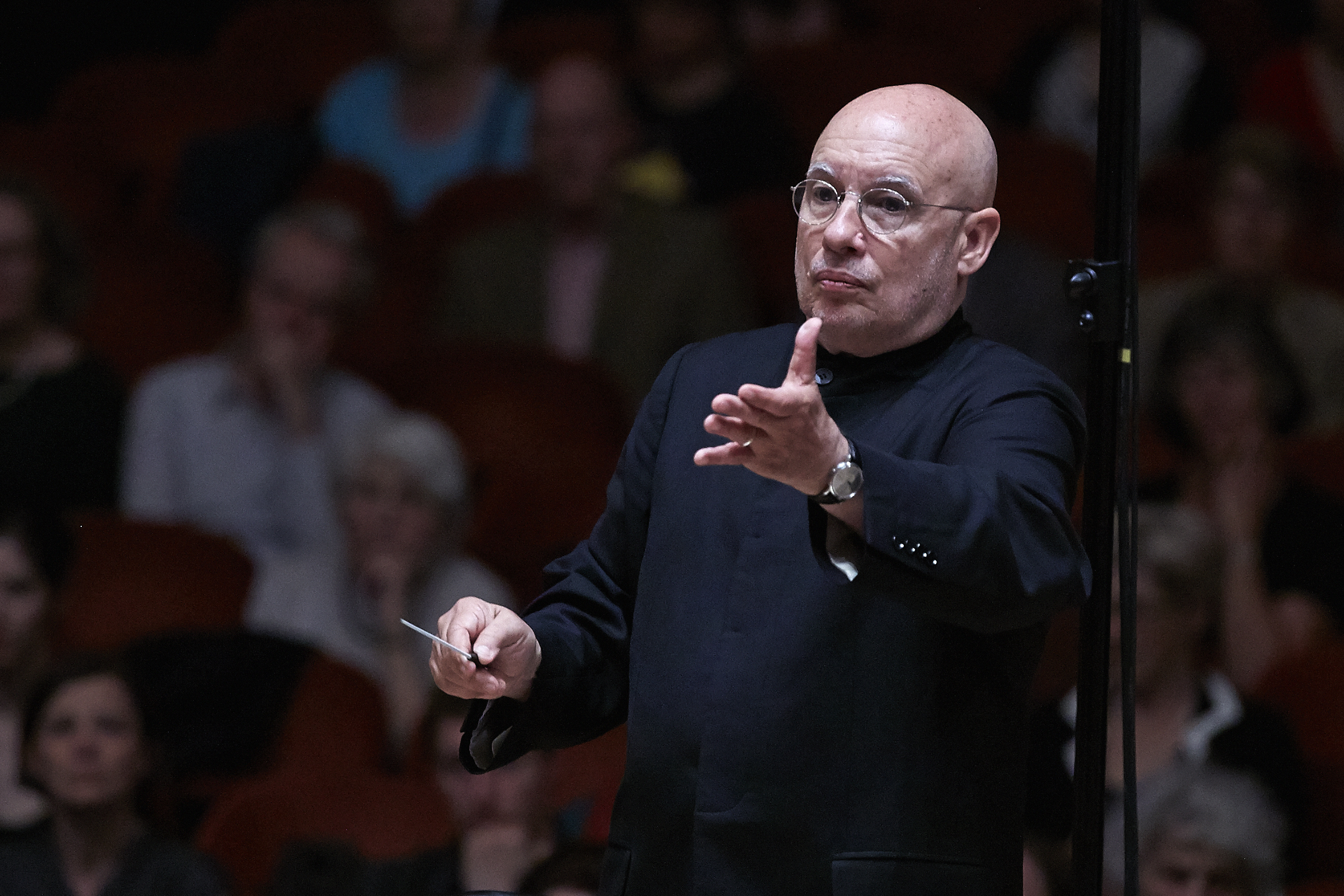
Former chief conductor Dennis Russell Davies

- Mario Venzago (1997–2003)
- Marko Letonja (2003–2006)
- Dennis Russell Davies (2009–2016)
- Ivor Bolton (2016–2025)
- Markus Poschner (2025–present)

== Awards ==
The recording 'A different Schumann Vol. 1–3' was awarded the Diapason d’Or in May 2004. The orchestra received the Diapason d'Or for the recording 'Felix Weingartner: Symphonic works I' in September 2005. The recording of Le Sacre du Printemps received the Supersonic-Prize and was nominated for the ICMA Music Award 2015.

== Venue ==
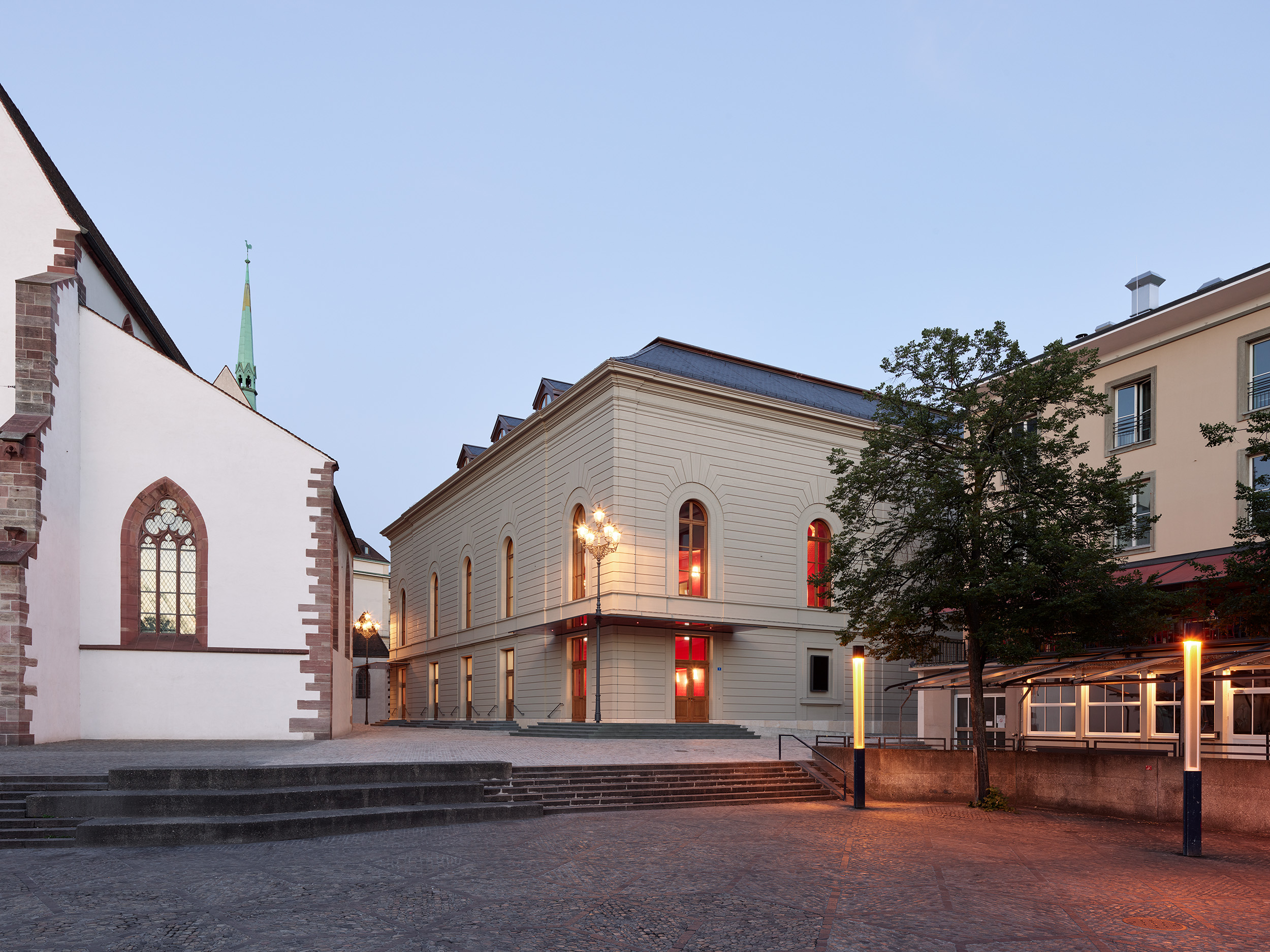
Stadtcasino Basel

== Discography ==
- 'Millistrade' (Musikalisches Singspiel von Marius Felix Lange und Linard Bardill)
- 'Of Madness and Love', Works by Hector Berlioz, inspired by William Shakespeare
- Franz Schubert: Symphonies No. 2 and 6
- Igor Stravinsky: Le Sacre du Printemps
- Philip Glass: Symphony No. 4 ("Heroes", from the music of David Bowie and Brian Eno)
- Philip Glass: Symphony No. 1, "Low"
- Arthur Honegger: Symphonies No. 2 and 4 (Deliciae Basiliensis)
- Franz Schubert: Symphony No. 9 "The Great C major"
- Arthur Honegger: Symphonies No. 1 and 3
- Franz Schubert: Symphonies No. 3 and 5
- 'Es ist ein Ros' entsprungen': Romantic Music for Christmas
- Anton Bruckner: Symphonies No. 4 and 7
- Felix Weingartner: Symphonic works I – VII
- Robert Schumann: 'A Different Schumann', Vol. 1–3
- Maurice Ravel: Works for Orchestra
- Bohuslav Martinů: Concertos for Piano
- Luigi Nono: Various Works
- Iannis Xenakis: Kraanerg, ballet music for orchestra and tape
- Klaus Huber: Schwarzerde
- Wladimir Vogel: Various works
- Frédéric Chopin: Works for Piano and Orchestra
- Thomas Kessler: Various works
- Othmar Schoeck: Penthesilea

== Literature ==
- Tilman Seebass: 100 Jahre AMG – Die Allgemeine Musikgesellschaft Basel 1876–1976. OCLC 5616151
- Rudolf Häusler: AMG – Allgemeine Musikgesellschaft Basel 1976–2001: Eine Festschrift zum 125-Jahr-Jubiläum. OCLC 53352488
- Dr. Hans Ziegler: Geschichte der Basler Orchester-Gesellschaft 1922–1970. Verlag Krebs AG, Basel. OCLC 557263351
- Sigfried Schibli: Geschichte der Basler Orchester-Gesellschaft 1971–2003. Verlag Krebs AG, Basel 2009. ISBN 978-3-85775-002-1 OCLC 496276263
