= Darius Milhaud =

French composer, conductor and teacher (1892–1974)

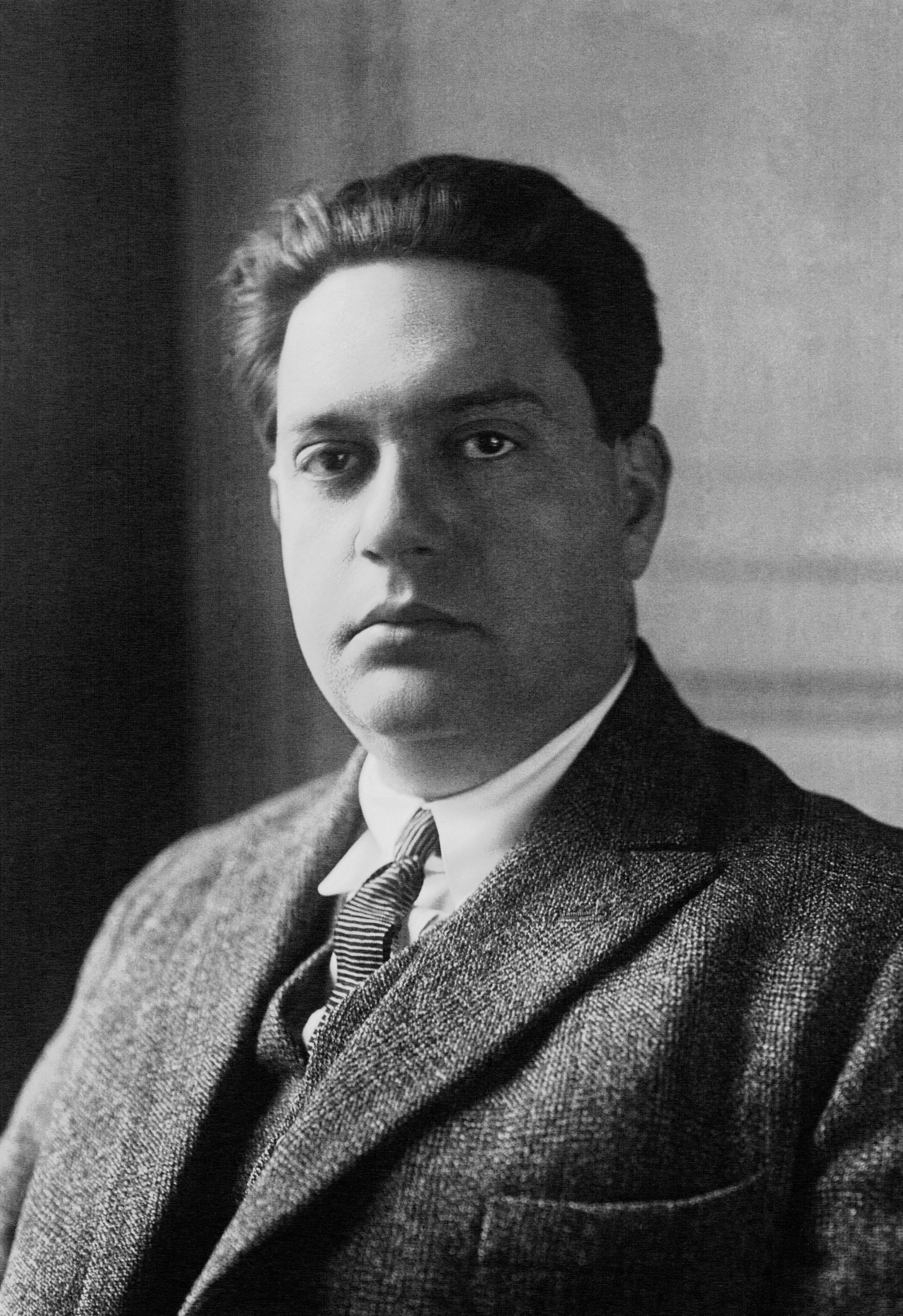
- Milhaud in 1923
- Born: 4 September 1892; Marseille, France
- Died: 22 June 1974 (aged 81); Geneva, Switzerland
- Education: Paris Conservatory
- Occupations: Composer; Conductor; Academic teacher
- Works: List of compositions
- Spouse: Madeleine Milhaud (m. 1925)
- Children: 1

Darius Milhaud (French: [daʁjys mijo]; Provençal: [miˈjawt]; 4 September 1892 – 22 June 1974) was a French composer, conductor, and teacher. He was a member of Les Six—The Group of Six—and one of the most prolific composers of the 20th century. His compositions are influenced by jazz and Brazilian music and make extensive use of polytonality. Milhaud is considered one of the key modernist composers. He taught many future jazz and classical composers, including Burt Bacharach, Dave Brubeck, Philip Glass, Steve Reich, György Kurtág, Karlheinz Stockhausen and Iannis Xenakis among others.

== Life and career ==
Milhaud was born in Marseille, the son of Sophie (Allatini) and Gad Gabriel Milhaud. He grew up in Aix-en-Provence, which he regarded as his true ancestral city. His was a long-established Jewish family of the Comtat Venaissin—a secluded region of Provence—with roots traceable there at least to the 15th century. On his father's side, Milhaud's Jewish lineage was thus neither Ashkenazi nor Sephardi, but specifically Provençal—dating to Jewish settlement in that part of France as early as the first centuries of the Common Era. Milhaud's mother was partly Sephardi on her father's side, via a Sephardi family from Italy.

Milhaud began as a violinist, later turning to composition. He studied at the Paris Conservatory, where he met fellow Les Six members Arthur Honegger and Germaine Tailleferre. He studied composition with Charles-Marie Widor and harmony and counterpoint with André Gedalge. He also studied privately with Vincent d'Indy. From 1917 to 1919, he served as secretary to Paul Claudel, the poet and dramatist who was then the French ambassador to Brazil, and with whom Milhaud collaborated for many years, writing music for many of his poems and plays. In Brazil, they collaborated on the ballet L'Homme et son désir.

On his return to France, Milhaud composed works influenced by Brazilian popular music, including songs by pianist and composer Ernesto Nazareth. Le Bœuf sur le toit includes melodies by Nazareth and other popular Brazilian composers, and evokes the sounds of Carnaval. Among the melodies is a Carnaval tune by the name of "The Bull on the Roof" (in Portuguese, which he translated to French 'Le boeuf sur le toit', known in English as 'The Ox on the Roof'). He also produced Saudades do Brasil, a suite of 12 dances evoking 12 Rio de Janeiro neighborhoods. Shortly after the original piano version appeared, he orchestrated the suite.

Contemporary European influences were also important. Milhaud dedicated his Fifth String Quartet (1920) to Arnold Schoenberg, and the next year conducted both the French and British premieres of Pierrot lunaire after multiple rehearsals. On a trip to the United States in 1922, Milhaud heard "authentic" jazz for the first time, on the streets of Harlem, which greatly influenced his music. The next year, he completed La création du monde (The Creation of the World), using ideas and idioms from jazz, cast as a ballet in six continuous dance scenes.

In 1925, Milhaud married his cousin Madeleine, an actress and reciter. In 1930 she gave birth to a son, the painter and sculptor Daniel Milhaud, who was the couple's only child.

Nazi Germany's invasion of France forced the Milhauds to leave France in 1940. They emigrated to the U.S. (Milhaud's Jewish background made it impossible for him to return to France before it was liberated). He secured a teaching post at Mills College in Oakland, California, where he composed the opera Bolivar (1943) and collaborated with Henri Temianka and the Paganini Quartet. In an extraordinary concert there in 1949, the Budapest Quartet performed his 14th String Quartet, followed by the Paganini Quartet's performance of his 15th; and then both ensembles played the two pieces together as an octet. In 1950, these pieces were performed at the Aspen Music Festival by the Paganini and Juilliard String Quartets.

On June 13,1945, his Suite Francaise, – Normandie, Bretagne, Île-de-France, Alsace-Lorraine, Provence, had its World Premiere performance at the Naumburg Orchestral Concerts, in the Naumburg Bandshell, Central Park, in the summer series.

Jazz pianist Dave Brubeck became one of Milhaud's most famous students when Brubeck studied at Mills College in the late 1940s. In a February 2010 interview with JazzWax, Brubeck said he attended Mills, a women's college (men were allowed in graduate programs), specifically to study with Milhaud, saying, "Milhaud was an enormously gifted classical composer and teacher who loved jazz and incorporated it into his work. My older brother Howard was his assistant and had taken all of his classes." Brubeck named his first son Darius.

In 1947 Milhaud was among the founders of the Music Academy of the West summer conservatory, where songwriter Burt Bacharach was among his students. Milhaud told Bacharach, "Don't be afraid of writing something people can remember and whistle. Don't ever feel discomfited by a melody."

From 1947 to 1971, he taught alternate years at Mills and the Paris Conservatoire, until poor health, which caused him to use a wheelchair during his later years (beginning in the 1930s), compelled him to retire. He also taught on the faculty of the Aspen Music Festival and School. As well as Brubeck, his students include William Bolcom, Vera Nicolaevna Preobrajenska, Steve Reich, Michiko Toyama, Katharine Mulky Warne, and Regina Hansen Willman. He died in Geneva at the age of 81, and he was buried in the Saint-Pierre Cemetery in Aix-en-Provence.

== Works ==
Suite d'après corrette (0:29)
Suite for oboe, clarinet and bassoon, Op. 161b (1937); after the incidental music Jules César, Op. 158 (1936)

Darius Milhaud was very prolific and composed for a wide range of genres. His opus list ended at 443.

== Archival collections ==
- There is a Darius Milhaud Collection at Mills College in California.
- Papers for the Darius Milhaud Society, formed by Milhaud's student Katharine Mulky Warne, are archived at Cleveland State University.
- There is another Darius Milhaud Collection at the New York Public Library for the Performing Arts in New York City.
- Seymour Fromer Collection at the Western Jewish History Center of the Judah L. Magnes Museum, in Berkeley, California, has librettos for Milhaud's opera, David, as well as a program for its American premiere, in Los Angeles at the Hollywood Bowl, and photocopies of newspaper coverage in the B'nai B'rith Messenger of Los Angeles of this event (1956).

== Selected filmography ==
- The Beloved Vagabond (1915)
- L'Inhumaine (1924)
- Land Without Bread (1933)
- Tartarin of Tarascon (1934)
- Madame Bovary (1934)
- The Beloved Vagabond (1936)
- The Citadel of Silence (1937)
- Rasputin (1938)
- Mollenard (1938)
- The Mayor's Dilemma (1939)
- Espoir: Sierra de Teruel (1945)
- The Private Affairs of Bel Ami (1947)
- Dreams That Money Can Buy (1947)
- Dieu a choisi Paris (1969)

== Legacy ==
Writing in his Guide to Twentieth Century Music, critic Mark Morris described Milhaud's work as "one of the unassessed quantities of 20th century music. For as one of its most prolific composers (around 450 works), the quality of his music is so patently uneven that the reputation for the banal and the shallow has masked what is or might be (given the paucity of performances) both inspired and fascinating." For a composer of acknowledged influence and significance, a number of his pieces lack contemporary professional recordings, such as the second Viola Concerto – a consequence perhaps of his prolific and uneven output.

Lycée intercommunal Darius-Milhaud near Paris is named after him.

== Sources ==
- Cucos, Mihai (Winter 2005). "A Few Points about Burt Bacharach ...". Perspectives of New Music. 43 (1): 198–211. doi:10.1353/pnm.2005.0004. JSTOR 25164577. S2CID 258130151.
- Milhaud, Darius (1967). Notes Without Music: An Autobiography. Translated by Donald Evans. London: Calder and Boyars. (French version published in 1953)
