= Little Symphony =

Little Symphony may refer to:

== Compositions ==
- Petite Symphonie (Gounod)
- Little Symphony No. 1 (Milhaud)
- Little Symphony No. 2 (Milhaud)
- Little Symphony No. 3 (Milhaud)
- Little Symphony No. 4 (Milhaud)
- Little Symphony No. 5 (Milhaud)
- Little Symphony No. 6 (Milhaud)

== Others ==
- Yusef Lateef's Little Symphony

== See also ==
- Sinfonietta (symphony)
- Chamber Symphony (disambiguation)
