= Chamber Symphony =

Chamber Symphony may refer to:

== Compositions ==
- Chamber Symphony (Adams)
- Chamber Symphony (Enescu)
- Chamber Symphony (Popov)
- Chamber Symphony (Shostakovich)
- Chamber Symphony No. 1 (Schoenberg)
- Chamber Symphony No. 2 (Schoenberg)
- Chamber Symphony (Franz Schreker)
- Little Symphony No. 1 (Milhaud)
- Little Symphony No. 2 (Milhaud)
- Little Symphony No. 3 (Milhaud)
- Little Symphony No. 4 (Milhaud)
- Little Symphony No. 5 (Milhaud)
- Little Symphony No. 6 (Milhaud)
- Chamber Symphony (Zwilich)

== Orchestras ==
- Aspen Chamber Symphony
- California Chamber Symphony
- Cleveland Chamber Symphony
- Dallas Chamber Symphony
- New York Chamber Symphony
- Park Avenue Chamber Symphony
- Washington Chamber Symphony

== See also ==
- Little Symphony (disambiguation)
- Sinfonietta (symphony)
- Symphony (Webern)
