= Musical ensemble =

Instrumental and/or vocal music group

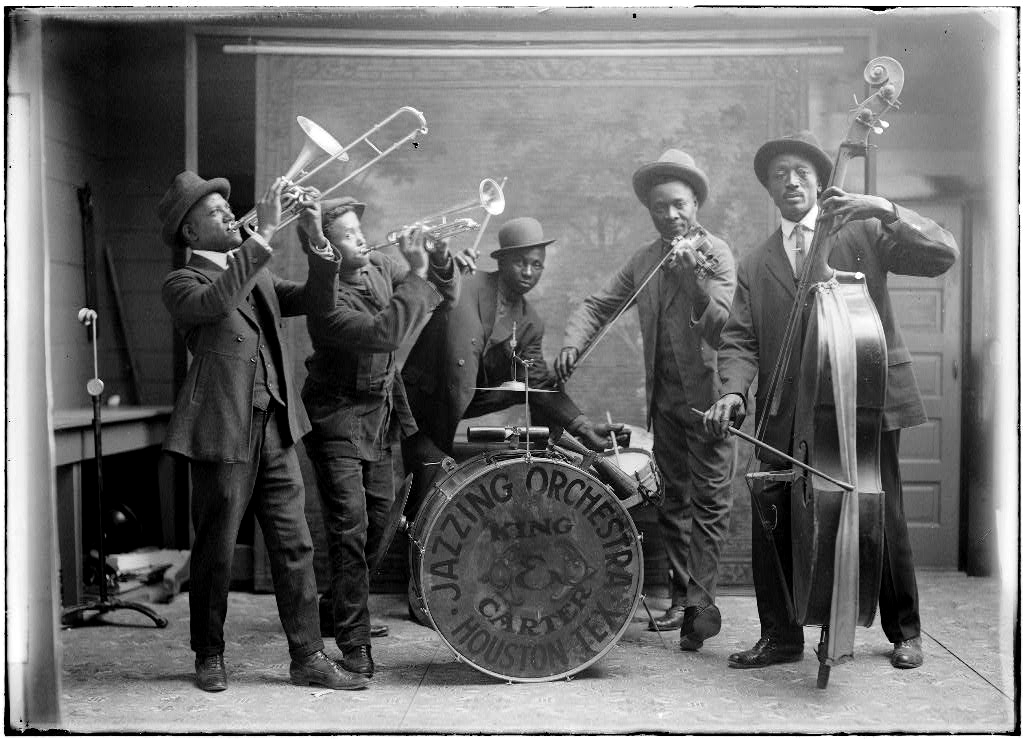
The King & Carter Jazzing Orchestra photographed in Houston, Texas, January 1921

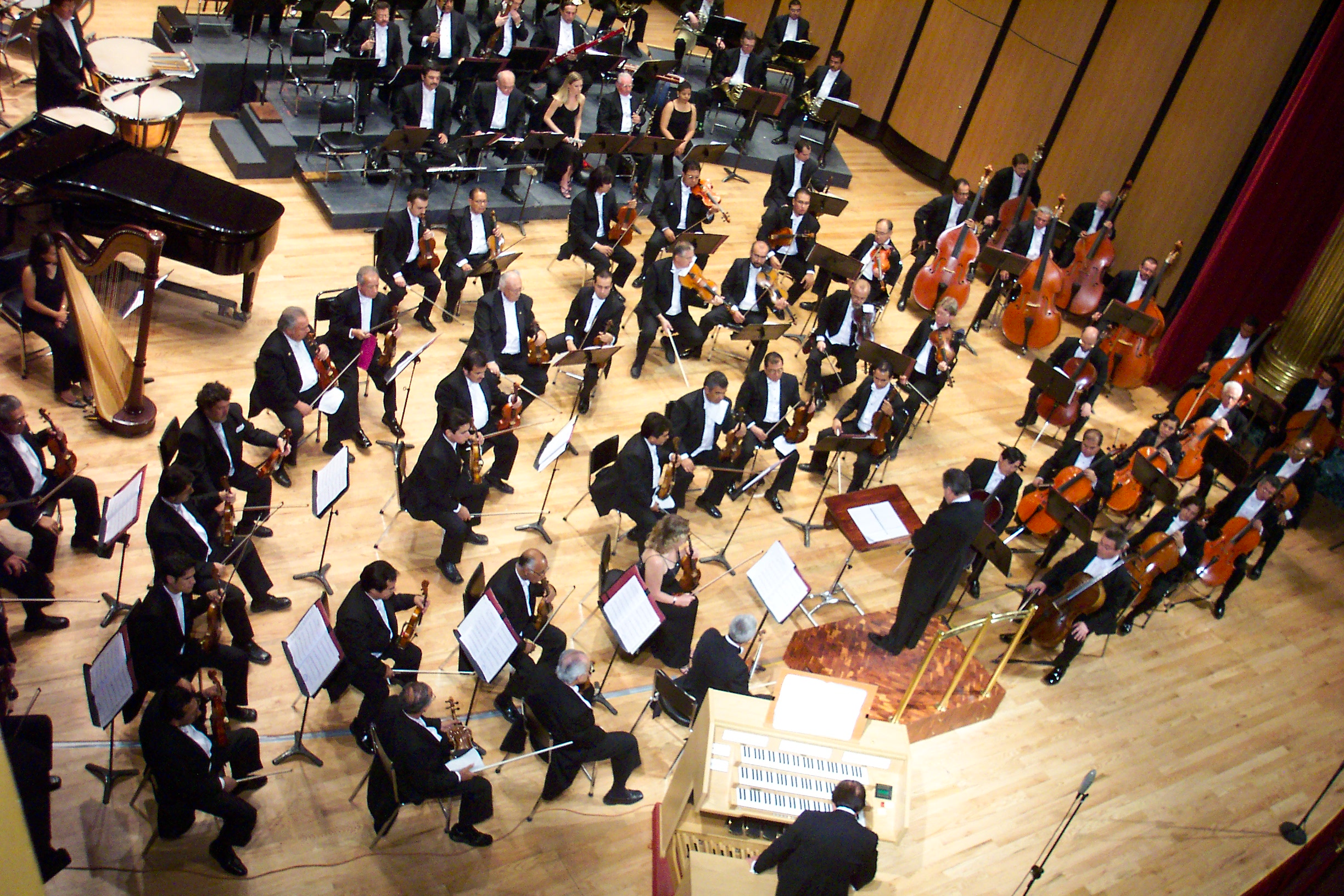
The Jalisco Philharmonic Orchestral is an example of a large western classical musical ensemble.

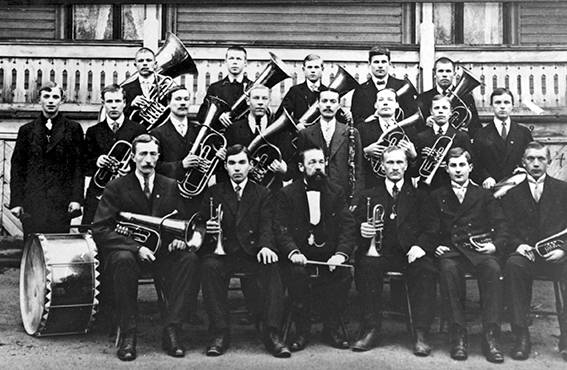
Pori Worker's Society Brass Band in the 1920s in Pori, Finland

A musical ensemble, also known as a music group, musical group, or band, is a group of people who perform instrumental and/or vocal music, with the ensemble typically known by a distinct name. Some music ensembles consist solely of instrumentalists, such as the jazz quartet or the orchestra. Other music ensembles consist solely of singers, such as choirs and doo-wop groups. In both popular music and classical music, there are ensembles in which both instrumentalists and singers perform, such as the rock band or the Baroque chamber group for basso continuo (harpsichord and cello) and one or more singers. In classical music, trios or quartets either blend the sounds of musical instrument families (such as piano, strings, and wind instruments) or group instruments from the same instrument family, such as string ensembles (e.g., string quartet) or wind ensembles (e.g., wind quintet). Some ensembles blend the sounds of a variety of instrument families, such as the orchestra, which uses a string section, brass instruments, woodwinds, and percussion instruments, or the concert band, which uses brass, woodwinds, and percussion. In jazz ensembles or combos, the instruments typically include wind instruments (one or more saxophones, trumpets, etc.), one or two chordal "comping" instruments (electric guitar, acoustic guitar, piano, or Hammond organ), a bass instrument (bass guitar or double bass), and a drummer or percussionist. Jazz ensembles may be solely instrumental, or they may consist of a group of instruments accompanying one or more singers. In rock and pop ensembles, usually called rock bands or pop bands, there are usually guitars and keyboards (piano, electric piano, Hammond organ, synthesizer, etc.), one or more singers, and a rhythm section made up of a bass guitar and drum kit.

Music ensembles typically have a leader. In jazz bands, rock and pop groups, and similar ensembles, this is the band leader. In classical music, orchestras, concert bands, and choirs are led by a conductor. In orchestra, the concertmaster (principal first violin player) is the instrumentalist leader of the orchestra. In orchestras, the individual sections also have leaders, typically called the "principal" of the section (e.g., the leader of the viola section is called the "principal viola"). Conductors are also used in jazz big bands and in some very large rock or pop ensembles (e.g., a rock concert that includes a string section, a horn section, and a choir that accompanies a rock band's performance).

== Classical chamber music ==
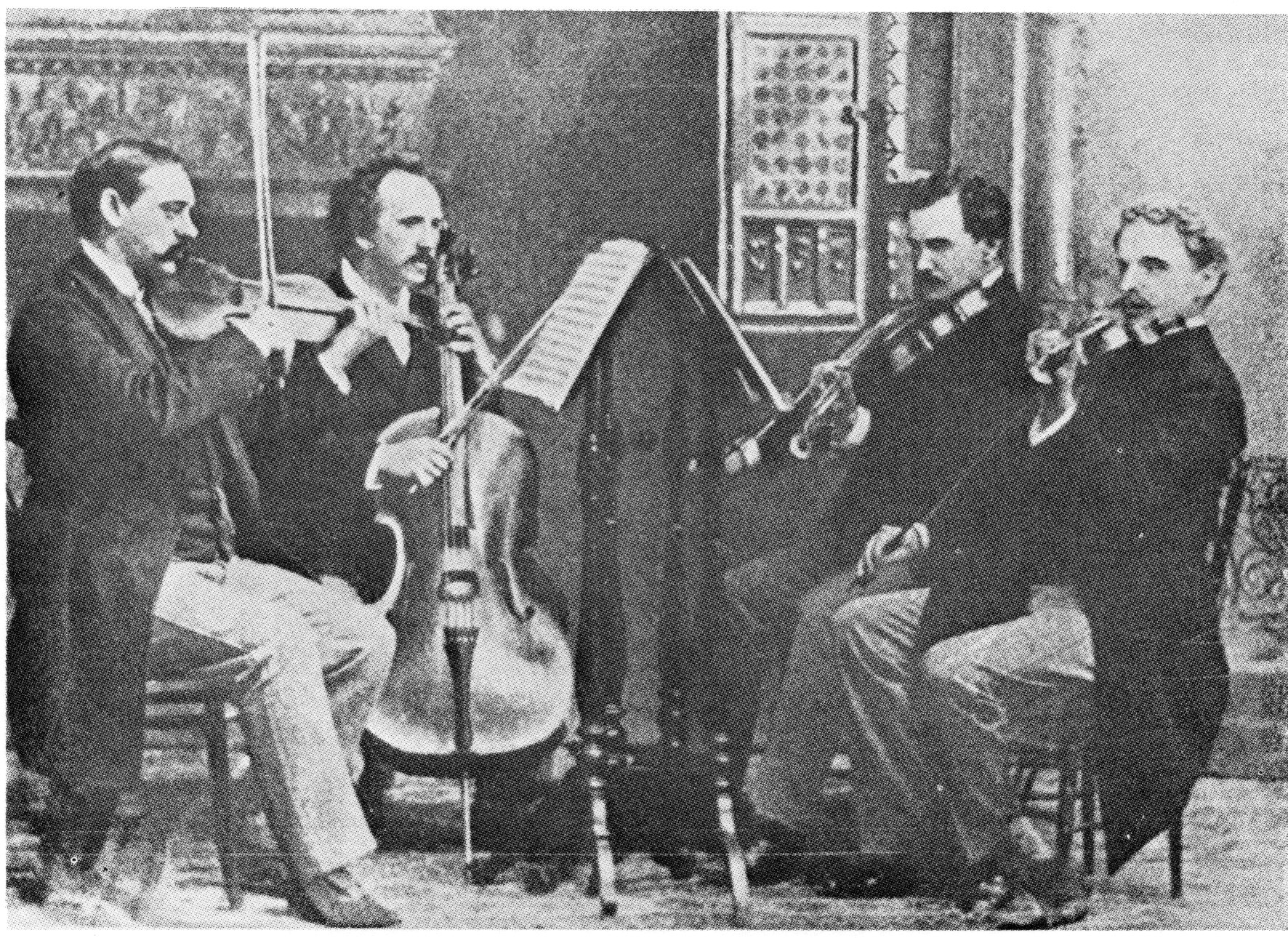
The Kneisel String Quartet, led by Franz Kneisel, is an example of chamber music. This American ensemble debuted Dvořák's American Quartet, Opus 96 (photographed c. 1891.)

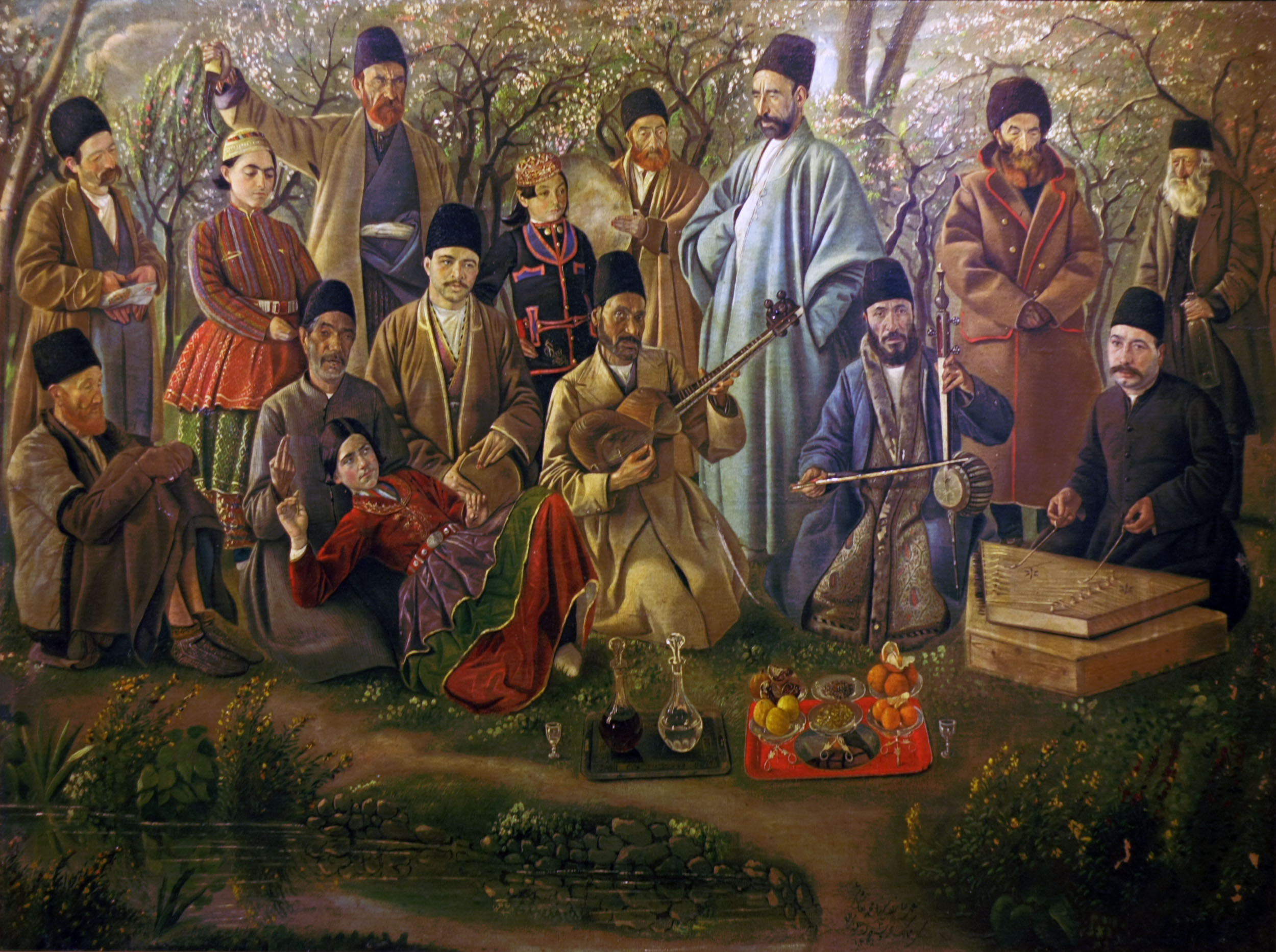
An Iranian musical ensemble, painted by Kamal-ol-molk in 1886

In Western classical music, smaller ensembles are called chamber music ensembles. The terms duo, trio, quartet, quintet, sextet, septet, octet, nonet, and decet describe groups of two up to ten musicians, respectively. A group of eleven musicians, such as found in The Carnival of the Animals, is called an undecet, and a group of twelve is called a duodecet (see Latin numerical prefixes). A soloist playing unaccompanied (e.g., a pianist playing a solo piano piece or a cellist playing a Bach suite for unaccompanied cello) is not an ensemble because it only contains one musician.

=== Four parts ===
==== Strings ====
A string quartet consists of two violins, a viola, and a cello. There is a vast body of music written for string quartets, making it an important genre in classical music.

==== Wind ====
A woodwind quartet usually features a flute, an oboe, a clarinet, and a bassoon.

Brass

A brass quartet features two trumpets, a trombone, and a tuba (or French horn (more commonly known as "horn")).

Sax

A saxophone quartet consists of a soprano saxophone, an alto saxophone, a tenor saxophone, and a baritone saxophone.

=== Five parts ===
The string quintet is a common type of group. It is similar to the string quartet, but with an additional viola, cello, or more rarely, the addition of a double bass. Terms such as "piano quintet" or "clarinet quintet" frequently refer to a string quartet plus a fifth instrument. Mozart's Clarinet Quintet is similarly a piece written for an ensemble consisting of two violins, a viola, a cello, and a clarinet, the last being the exceptional addition to a "normal" string quartet.

Some other quintets in classical music are the wind quintet, usually consisting of flute, oboe, clarinet, bassoon, and horn; the brass quintet, consisting of two trumpets, one horn, a trombone, and a tuba; and the reed quintet, consisting of an oboe, a soprano clarinet, a saxophone, a bass clarinet, and a bassoon.

=== Six or more instruments ===
Classical chamber ensembles of six (sextet), seven (septet), or eight musicians (octet) are fairly common; the use of latinate terms for larger groups is rare, except for the nonet (nine musicians). In most cases, a larger classical group is referred to as an orchestra of some type or a concert band. A small orchestra with fifteen to thirty members (violins, violas, four cellos, two or three double basses, and several woodwind or brass instruments) is called a chamber orchestra. A sinfonietta usually denotes a somewhat smaller orchestra (though still not a chamber orchestra). Larger orchestras are called symphony orchestras (see below) or philharmonic orchestras.

A pops orchestra is an orchestra that mainly performs light classical music (often in abbreviated, simplified arrangements) and orchestral arrangements and medleys of popular jazz, music theater, or pop music songs. A string orchestra has only string instruments, i.e., violins, violas, cellos, and double basses.

A symphony orchestra is an ensemble usually comprising at least thirty musicians; the number of players is typically between fifty and ninety-five and may exceed one hundred. A symphony orchestra is divided into families of instruments. In the string family, there are sections of violins (I and II), violas, cellos (often eight), and basses (often from six to eight). The standard woodwind section consists of flutes (one doubling piccolo), oboes (one doubling English horn), soprano clarinets (one doubling bass clarinet), and bassoons (one doubling contrabassoon). The standard brass section consists of horns, trumpets, trombones, and tuba. The percussion section includes the timpani, bass drum, snare drum, and any other percussion instruments called for in a score (e.g., triangle, glockenspiel, chimes, cymbals, wood blocks, etc.). In Baroque music (1600–1750) and music from the early Classical period music (1750–1820), the percussion parts in orchestral works may only include timpani.

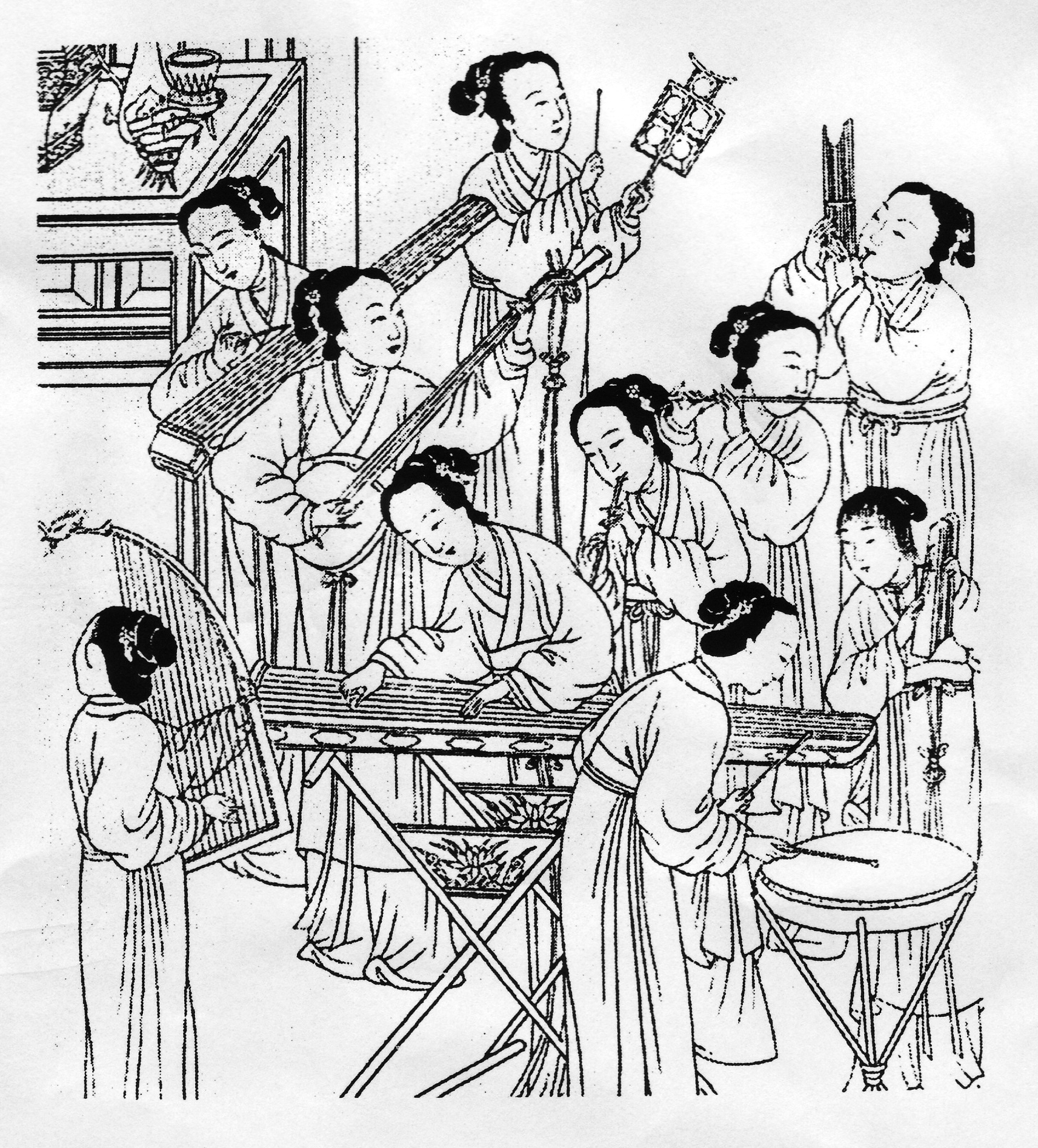
An all-female Chinese classical ensemble, from a 16th century edition of Tale of the Pipa

A wind orchestra or concert band is a large classical ensemble generally made up of between 40 and 70 musicians from the woodwind, brass, and percussion families, along with the double bass. The concert band has a larger number and variety of wind instruments than the symphony orchestra but does not have a string section (although a single double bass is common in concert bands). The woodwind section of a concert band consists of piccolo, flutes, oboes (one doubling English horn), bassoons (one doubling contrabassoon), soprano clarinets (one doubling E♭ clarinet, one doubling alto clarinet), bass clarinets (one doubling contrabass clarinet or contra-alto clarinet), alto saxophones (one doubling soprano saxophone), tenor saxophone, and baritone saxophone. The brass section consists of horns, trumpets or cornets, trombones, euphoniums, and tubas. The percussion section consists of the timpani, bass drum, snare drum, and any other percussion instruments called for in a score (e.g., triangle, glockenspiel, chimes, cymbals, wood blocks, etc.).

Less well known is the large symphonic accordion orchestra. Typically, it includes between 50 and 100 musicians whose free-bass instruments are individually re-tuned in order to recreate the full range of orchestral sounds and timbers required for the performance of traditional Western classical music.

When orchestras perform baroque music (from the 17th century and early 18th century), they may also use a harpsichord or pipe organ, to play the continuo part. When orchestras perform Romantic-era music (from the 19th century), they may also use harps or unusual instruments such as the wind machine or cannons. When orchestras perform music from the 20th century or the 21st century, occasionally instruments such as electric guitar, theremin, or even an electronic synthesizer may be used.

== Vocal group ==
A vocal group is a performing ensemble of vocalists who sing and harmonize together. The first well-known vocals groups emerged in the 19th century, and the style had reached widespread popularity by the 1940s.

Vocal groups can come in several different forms, including:

=== Based on genders ===
- Boys' choir – vocal group of boys who have yet to begin puberty
- Boy band – vocal group consisting of (young) males
- Girl group – vocal group consisting of (young) females
- Co-ed group – vocal group consisting of both males and females, typically in their teens or early twenties

=== Based on project type ===
- Sub-unit – a group that is descended from the main group, with smaller number of members. Usually, all the members are from the main group.
- Supergroup – a musical group formed with members who are already successful as solo artists or as members of other successful groups.

=== Others ===
- Choir – a group of voices. By analogy, sometimes a group of similar instruments in a symphony orchestra is referred to as a choir. For example, the woodwind instruments of a symphony orchestra could be called the woodwind choir. Gospel Choir is famous in this genre.
- Doo-wop group
- Vocal quartet (as well as vocal trios and quintets)
  - Barbershop quartet – a cappella close-harmony vocal group
  - Gospel quartet

== Other western musical ensembles ==
A group that plays popular music or military music is usually called a band; a drum and bugle corps is a type of the latter. These bands perform a wide range of music, ranging from arrangements of jazz orchestral, or popular music to military-style marches. Drum corps perform on brass and percussion instruments only. Drum and Bugle Corps incorporate costumes, hats, and pageantry in their performances.

Other band types include:

- Brass bands: groups consisting of around 30 brass and percussion players;
- Corps of drums, Fife and drums, Pipe bands and Drum and bugle corps are mostly ceremonial bands
- Jug bands;
- Marching bands and military bands, dating back to the Ottoman military bands.
- Mexican Mariachi groups typically consist of at least two violins, two trumpets, one Spanish guitar, one vihuela (a high-pitched, five-string guitar), and one Guitarrón (a Mexican acoustic bass that is roughly guitar-shaped), and one or more singers.
- Mexican banda groups
- String bands

See List of musical band types for more.

== Role of women ==
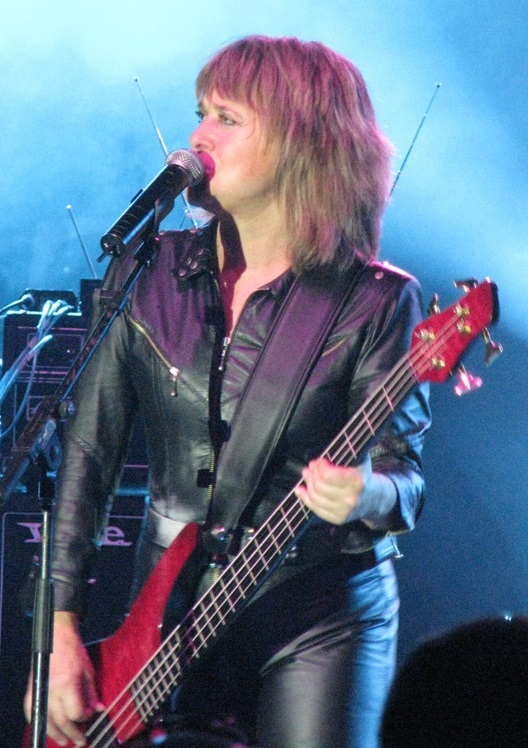
Suzi Quatro is a singer, bassist and bandleader. When she launched her career in 1973, she was one of the few prominent women instrumentalists and bandleaders in rock music

Women have a high prominence in many popular music styles as singers. However, professional women instrumentalists are uncommon in popular music, especially in rock genres such as heavy metal. "[P]laying in a band is largely a male homosocial activity, that is, learning to play in a band is largely a peer-based... experience, shaped by existing sex-segregated friendship networks." As well, rock music "...is often defined as a form of male rebellion vis-à-vis female bedroom culture." In popular music, there has been a gendered "distinction between public (male) and private (female) participation" in music. "[S]everal scholars have argued that men exclude women from bands or the bands' rehearsals, recordings, performances, and other social activities." "Women are mainly regarded as passive and private consumers of allegedly slick, prefabricated – hence, inferior – pop music..., excluding them from participating as high-status rock musicians." One of the reasons that there are rarely mixed gender bands is that "bands operate as tight-knit units in which homosocial solidarity – social bonds between people of the same sex... – plays a crucial role." In the 1960s pop music scene, "[s]inging was sometimes an acceptable pastime for a girl, but playing an instrument...simply wasn't done."

"The rebellion of rock music was largely a male rebellion; the women—often, in the 1950s and '60s, girls in their teens—in rock usually sang songs as personæ utterly dependent on their macho boyfriends..." Philip Auslander says that "Although there were many women in rock by the late 1960s, most performed only as singers, a traditionally feminine position in popular music." Though some women played instruments in American all-female garage rock bands, none of these bands achieved more than regional success. So they "did not provide viable templates for women's on-going participation in rock". About the gender composition of heavy metal bands, it has been said that "[h]eavy metal performers are almost exclusively male" "...[a]t least until the mid-1980s" apart from "...exceptions such as Girlschool". However, "...now [in the 2010s] maybe more than ever–strong metal women have put up their dukes and got down to it," "carv[ing] out a considerable place for [them]selves". When Suzi Quatro emerged in 1973, "no other prominent female musician worked in rock simultaneously as a singer, instrumentalist, songwriter, and bandleader." According to Auslander, she was "kicking down the male door in rock and roll and proving that a female musician ... and this is a point I am extremely concerned about ... could play as well if not better than the boys".

== See also ==
- Band (rock and pop)
- All-female band
- Boy band
- Girl group
- Pop duo
- Live band karaoke
- Music industry
- Percussion ensemble
- Musical collective
