= Sinfonietta (symphony) =

A sinfonietta is a symphony that is smaller in scale (either in terms of length or the instrumental forces required), or lighter in approach than a standard symphony. Although of Italian form, the word is not genuine in that language and has seldom been used by Italian composers. It appears to have been coined in 1874 by Joachim Raff for his Op. 188, but became common usage only in the early 20th century (Temperley 2001).

Just as the term symphony itself can refer to pieces of music of varied size and scope, it is difficult to identify common criteria which pieces called sinfonietta share. Many of the sinfoniettas listed on this page employ larger forces and/or are longer than pieces designated symphonies, sometimes even by the same composer.

Examples of sinfoniettas include:

- William Alwyn's Sinfonietta for strings (1970)
- Malcolm Arnold's Sinfonietta No. 1, Op. 48 (1954), Sinfonietta No. 2, Op. 65 (1958), and Sinfonietta No. 3, Op. 81 (1964)
- Alexander Arutiunian's Sinfonietta for string orchestra (1966)
- Jürg Baur's Triton-Sinfonietta: 3 Grotesken für Kammerorchester (1974)
- Maciej Bałenkowski's Sinfonietta no. 1 "Time is ticking" for string orchestra (2013/2014) and Sinfonietta no. 2 "Polonia" - hommage à Wojciech Kilar for string orchestra (2017/2018)
- Arnold Bax's Sinfonietta (1932)
- Lennox Berkeley's Sinfonietta, Op. 34 (1950)
- Herbert Blendinger's Sinfonietta, Op. 30 (1976)
- Eugène Bozza's Sinfonietta for string orchestra, Op. 61 (1944)
- Benjamin Britten's Sinfonietta, Op. 1 (1932)
- George Whitefield Chadwick's Sinfonietta (1904)
- Henry Cowell's Sinfonietta for chamber orchestra (1928)
- Ingolf Dahl's Sinfonietta for wind band
- Ikuma Dan's Sinfonietta (1974)
- Peter Maxwell Davies's Sinfonietta accademica (1987)
- Louis Durey's Sinfonietta for strings, Op. 105 (1966)
- Ulvi Cemal Erkin's Sinfonietta for string orchestra (1951–59)
- Iván Erőd's Minnesota Sinfonietta, Op. 51
- Harald Genzmer's Sinfonietta for string orchestra
- Peggy Glanville-Hicks's Sinfonietta No. 1 in D minor for small orchestra (1935) and Sinfonietta No. 2 for orchestra (1938)
- Kimmo Hakola's Sinfonietta (1999)
- Ernesto Halffter's Sinfonietta in D major (1925)
- Josef Matthias Hauer's Sinfonietta in 3 Sätzen, Op. 50
- Bernard Herrmann's Sinfonietta for string orchestra (1935)
- Paul Hindemith's Lustige Sinfonietta, Op. 4 (1916), and Symphonietta (Little Symphony) in E major (1949)
- Alun Hoddinott's Sinfonietta No. 1, Op. 56 (1968), Sinfonietta No. 2, Op. 67 (1969), Sinfonietta No. 3, Op. 71 (1970), and Sinfonietta No. 4 (1971)
- Bertold Hummel's Sinfonietta for wind orchestra, Op. 39 (1970)
- Mikhail Ippolitov-Ivanov's Sinfonietta, Op. 34 (arrangement for large orchestra of Violin Sonata, Op. 8) (1902)
- Leoš Janáček's Sinfonietta (1926)
- John Joubert's Sinfonietta for chamber orchestra, Op. 38
- Pál Kadosa's Sinfonietta for orchestra
- Robert Kajanus's Sinfonietta, Op. 16 (1915)
- Vítězslava Kaprálová's Military Sinfonietta, Op. 11 (1937)
- Nikolai Kapustin's Sinfonietta for orchestra, Op. 49 (1986)
- Erich Wolfgang Korngold's Sinfonietta in B major, Op. 5 (1912)
- Ernst Krenek's Sinfonietta for string orchestra, "A brasileira", Op. 131 (1952)
- Ladislav Kubík's Sinfonietta No. 1 for 19 instruments (1999), No. 2, "Jacob’s Well" for orchestra (1999) and No. 3, "Gong" for mezzo-soprano, mixed choir, orchestra and electronics (2007–08)
- James MacMillan's Sinfonietta (1991)
- Elizabeth Maconchy's Sinfonietta (1976), not to be confused with her Little Symphony (1980–81)
- Tomás Marco's Sinfonietta No. 1 ("Opaco resplandor de la memoria"), for orchestra (1998–99), and Sinfonietta No. 2 "Curvas del Guadiana" (2004)
- Igor Markevitch's Sinfonietta in F (1928–29)
- Bohuslav Martinů's Sinfonietta giocosa (1940) and Sinfonietta La Jolla (1950), both for piano and chamber orchestra
- William Mathias's Sinfonietta, Op. 34 (1967)
- Johan de Meij's Sinfonietta No. 1 for brass band (2011)
- Darius Milhaud's Sinfonietta, Op. 363 (1957)
- E. J. Moeran's Sinfonietta (1944)
- José Pablo Moncayo's Sinfonietta (1945)
- Saburō Moroi's Sinfonietta in B-flat, Op. 24 "For Children" (1943)
- Nikolai Myaskovsky's Sinfonietta No. 1 for small orchestra, Op. 10 (1911), No. 2 for string orchestra, Op. 32 No. 2 (1929) and No. 3 for string orchestra, Op. 68 (1946)
- Ottokar Nováček's Sinfonietta for woodwind octet (1905)
- Krzysztof Penderecki's Sinfonietta No. 1 for string orchestra (1992), No. 2 for clarinet and strings (1994), No. 3 for string orchestra (2012) and Sinfonietta for flute and string orchestra (2019)
- George Perle's Sinfonietta I (1987) and II (1990)
- Astor Piazzolla's Sinfonietta for chamber orchestra, Op. 19
- Walter Piston's Sinfonietta (1941)
- Francis Poulenc's Sinfonietta (1947)
- Sergei Prokofiev's Sinfonietta in A major, Op. 5 (1909, rev. 1929 as Op. 48)
- Joachim Raff's Sinfonietta for ten winds, Op. 188 (1874)
- Max Reger's Sinfonietta in A major, Op. 90 (1904–05)
- Wallingford Riegger's Sinfonietta (1959)
- Nikolai Rimsky-Korsakov's Sinfonietta on Russian Themes in A minor, Op. 31 (1879–84)
- Julius Röntgen's Sinfonietta humoristica (1922)
- Albert Roussel's Sinfonietta for string orchestra, Op. 52 (1934)
- Edmund Rubbra's Sinfonietta for large string orchestra, Op. 163 (1984–85)
- Cyril Scott's Sinfonietta for organ, harp and strings (1962)
- Humphrey Searle's Sinfonietta, Op. 49, for flute, oboe, clarinet, bassoon, horn, violin, viola, cello, and double bass (1968–69)
- Kazimierz Serocki's Sinfonietta for 2 string orchestras (1956)
- Vissarion Shebalin's Sinfonietta on Russian folksongs, Op. 43 (1949–51)
- Nikos Skalkottas's Sinfonietta (1948–49)
- Carlos Surinach's Sinfonietta flamenca (1953–54)
- Germaine Tailleferre's Symphonietta for trumpet, tympani and strings (1974–75)
- Alexandre Tansman's Sinfonietta No. 1, "À mon ami Louis Gruenberg" (1924) and Sinfonietta No. 1, "À Renard Czajkowski" (1978)
- Boris Tchaikovsky's Sinfonietta for string orchestra (1953)
- Mikis Theodorakis's Sinfonietta for solo flute, piano and string orchestra (1947)
- Ernst Toch's Sinfonietta for string orchestra, Op. 96 (1964), Sinfonietta for wind instruments and percussion, Op. 97 (1964)
- Eduard Tubin's Sinfonietta on Estonian Motifs (1940)
- Geirr Tveitt's Sinfonietta di Soffiatori (1962)
- Erich Urbanner's Sinfonietta 79
- Anatol Vieru's Sinfonietta (1975)
- Heitor Villa-Lobos's Sinfonietta No. 1 (1916) and Sinfonietta No. 2 (1947)
- Johan Wagenaar's Sinfonietta (1916)
- Graham Waterhouse's Sinfonietta for string orchestra, Op. 54 (2002)
- Franz Waxman's Sinfonietta for string orchestra and timpani
- Mieczysław Weinberg's Sinfonietta No. 1, Op. 41 (1948) and Sinfonietta No. 2 for string orchestra and timpani, Op. 74 (1960)
- Felix Weingartner's Sinfonietta, Op. 83 (1932)
- John Williams's Sinfonietta for wind ensemble (1968)
- Malcolm Williamson's Sinfonietta (1965)
- Alexander von Zemlinsky's Sinfonietta for orchestra, Op. 23 (1934)
- Zhu Jian'er's Sinfonietta, Op. 38 (1994)
- Matteo Zanetti's Symphonietta for string orchestra (2010)

== See also ==
- Little Symphony (disambiguation)
- Chamber Symphony (disambiguation)
