= GreatGuys =

South Korean music group

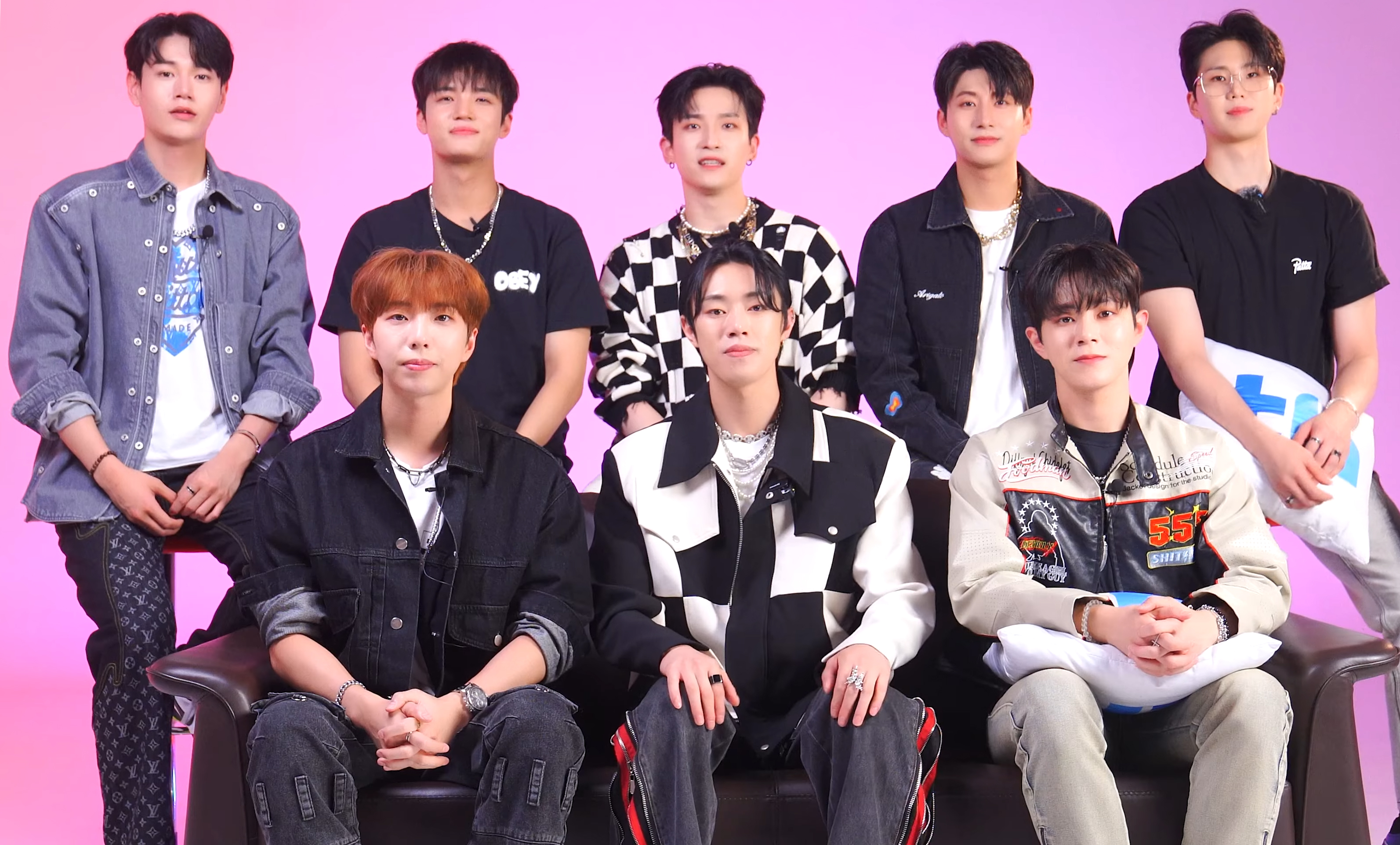
- GreatGuys in 2023

Background information
- Origin: Seoul, South Korea
- Genres: K-pop, dance
- Years active: 2017–2025
- Label: DNA
- Past members: Jaei; Uiyeon; Horyeong; Daun; Baekgyeol; Donghwi; Hwalchan; Haneul; Dongin
- Website: dnaent.co.kr

GreatGuys (Korean: 멋진녀석들) was a South Korean boy band signed to DNA Entertainment. The group consisted of nine members: Jaei, Uiyeon, Horyeong, Daun, Baekgyeol, Donghwi, Hwalchan, Haneul, and Dongin. The nonet debuted on August 25, 2017, with the single "Last Men". The group received the Rookie of the Year Award at the 2018 Asia Model Awards. GreatGuys released the mini-albums Take Off in 2018, We're Not Alone_Chapter 1: It's You in 2019, We're Not Alone_Chapter 2: You & Me in 2020, and We're Not Alone Final: Only You in 2022. Following the departure of six of its members, GreatGuys released a digital single as a trio in June 2024.

== History ==
=== 2017–2019: Formation and debut ===
The nine members of GreatGuys—Jaei, Uiyeon, Horyeong, Daun, Baekgyeol, Donghwi, Hwalchan, Haneul, and Dongin—were trainees for three years. The name of the group signifies its ability to be "show a cool image on and off stage". With an average height of 185 centimetres (6.07 ft), they have been dubbed "the tallest idols". The nonet released its debut synth-pop digital single album Last Men and its title track on August 25, 2017. The group held a showcase in Japan the following January. A tropical dance song, GreatGuys' second single album Ganda and eponymous title track was released on April 7, 2018. Main vocalist Daun contributed to the song's lyrics and Dongin wrote the rap portions of the track. A Japanese version was issued two months later. The group received the Rookie of the Year Award at the 2018 Asia Model Awards ceremony.

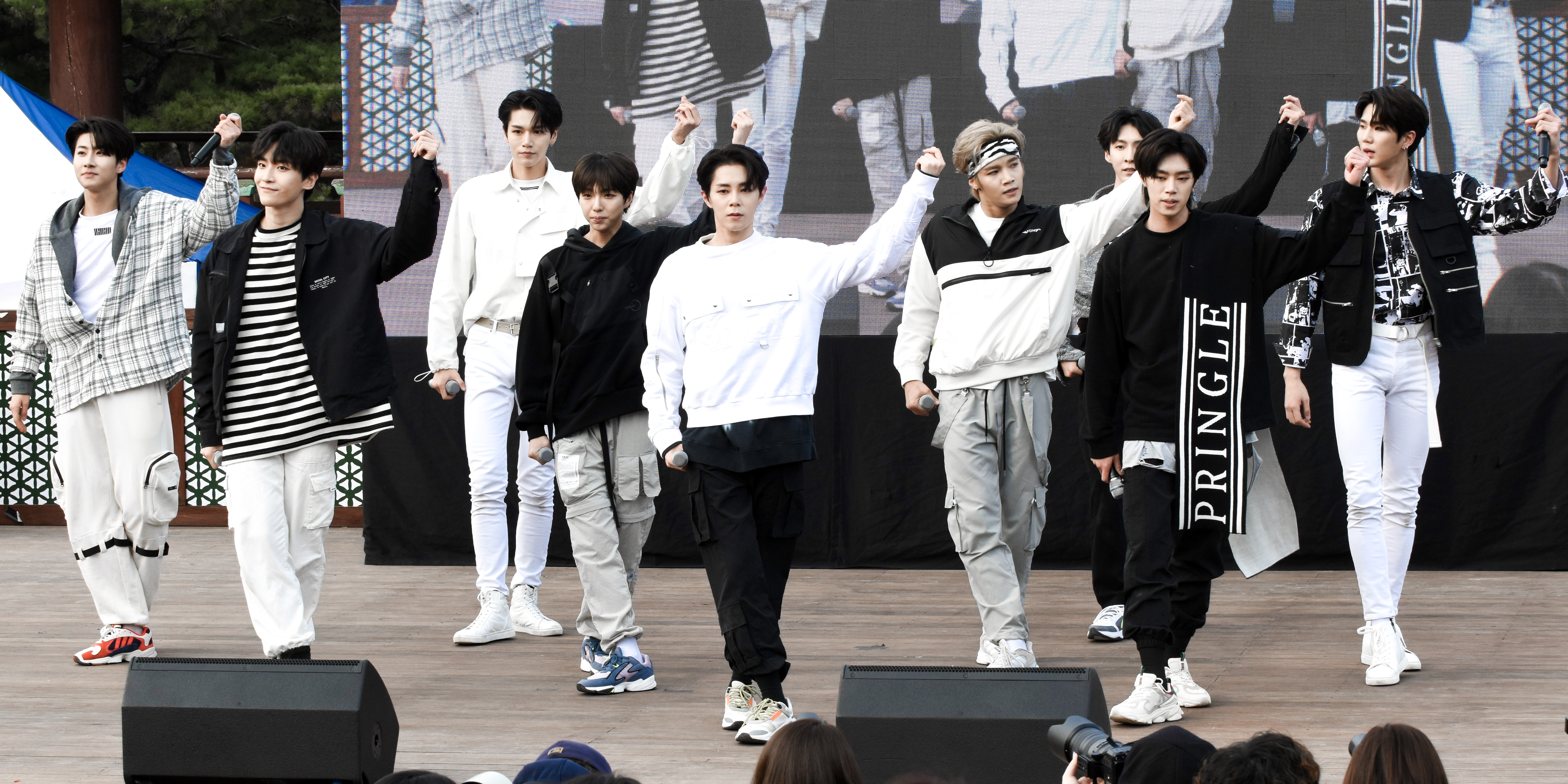
GreatGuys performing at the 4th Happy Festival of Urban Kids, 2019

GreatGuys released its first mini-album Take Off on September 4, 2018. Its lead single "Illusion" is a hip-hop-rock track. Hosted at Seoul National University, the group performed at the 2018 Hallyu Dream Donation Concert. GreatGuys also held on a series of live concerts in Japan, Thailand, and Europe throughout November. At the end of the year, entertainment website Issue Daily bestowed the group with the Bright New Artist Award. GreatGuys issued its third single album Trigger and its disco-influenced dance single "Dang!" on April 12, 2019. It was released as gratitude for the group's crowdfunding project after it surpassed its funding goal by 400%. The first of a three-part series, GreatGuys released its second mini-album We're Not Alone_Chapter 1: It's You on October 9. It was fronted by the R&B-tinged dance track "Be on You". GreatGuys performed as the only South Korean act at the All Together Asia Land festival in Ho Chi Minh City later that month.

=== 2020–2025: Continued releases, member departures, and disbandment ===
GreatGuys embarked on a Caribbean tour in February 2020 and became the first K-pop group to hold a concert in the Dominican Republic. On June 26, GreatGuys released a remake of Deux's "In Summer". Reworked as a city pop track, it serves as the first of two lead singles from its third mini-album. The record We're Not Alone_Chapter 2: You & Me and its second single "Run" were released on July 8. On April 18, 2021, GreatGuys released a special album entitled Again accompanied by its disco-tinged lead single "Touch by Touch". The group released its fourth mini-album We're Not Alone Final: Only You with the lead single "Blind Love" on July 20, 2022. Jaei, citing health reasons, terminated his contract with the agency and departed from the group the following month.

On February 1, 2024, Haneul, Daun, Uiyeon, Dongin, and Hwalchan left the group upon the expiration of their contracts with DNA Entertainment. As a trio, Horyeong, Baekgyeol, and Donghwi released the trot-pop digital single "I Love You" on June 30. On April 1, 2025, the company announced the expiration of GreatGuys' contract.

== Musical style ==
GreatGuys have cited BTS as their role models.

== Former members ==
List of members and roles.

- Jaei (재이) – leader, lead vocals
- Uiyeon (의연) – rap
- Horyeong (호령) – subvocals
- Daun (다운) – main vocals
- Baekgyeol (백결) – lead vocals
- Donghwi (동휘) – main vocals
- Hwalchan (활찬) – subvocals
- Haneul (한을) – subvocals
- Dongin (동인) – rap

== Discography ==
=== Extended plays ===
Title	Album details	Peak positions	Sales
Title	Album details	KOR	Sales
Take Off	Released: September 4, 2018; Label: DNA, Soribada; Formats: CD, digital download	42	—N/a
We're Not Alone_Chapter 1: It's You	Released: October 9, 2019; Label: DNA, Music&New; Formats: CD, digital download	49	KOR: 532
We're Not Alone_Chapter 2: You & Me	Released: July 8, 2020; Label: DNA, Genie Music; Formats: CD, digital download	52	KOR: 3,201
We're Not Alone Final: Only You	Released: July 20, 2022; Label: DNA, Genie Music; Formats: CD, digital download	—	—N/a
Record of Youth: EP.1: Destiny	Released: June 20, 2023; Label: DNA, Genie Music; Formats: CD, digital download	—	—N/a
Record of Youth: EP.2: Deeply	Released: November 6, 2023; Label: DNA, Genie Music; Formats: CD, digital download	—	—N/a

=== Single albums ===
Title	Album details	Peak positions
Title	Album details	KOR
Last Men	Released: August 25, 2017; Label: DNA, Cuo Music; Formats: Digital download	—
Ganda	Released: April 7, 2018; Label: DNA, Ogam; Formats: Digital download	—
Trigger	Released: April 12, 2019; Label: DNA, Wuzo; Formats: Digital download	—
Again	Released: April 18, 2021; Label: DNA, Genie Music; Formats: CD, digital download	82
Change	Released: June 30, 2024; Label: DNA, Genie Music; Formats: CD, digital download	—

=== Singles ===
Title	Year	Album
Korean
"Last Men"	2017	Last Men
"Ganda"	2018	Ganda
"Illusion"	2018	Take Off
"Dang!"	2019	Trigger
"Be on You"	2019	We're Not Alone_Chapter 1: It's You
"In Summer" (여름안에서; Yeoreum Aneseo)	2020	We're Not Alone_Chapter 2: You & Me
"Run"	2020	We're Not Alone_Chapter 2: You & Me
"Touch by Touch"	2021	Again
"Blind Love"	2022	We're Not Alone Final: Only You
"Luv Luv Luv"	2023	Record of Youth : EP. 1: Destiny
"Deep in Love" (딥하게; Diphage)	2023	Record of Youth : EP. 2: Deeply
"I Love You" (각이야; Gagiya)	2024	Change
Japanese
"Ganda"	2018	Non-album single

== Awards and nominations ==
Name of the award ceremony, year presented, category, nominee of the award, and the result of the nomination
Award ceremony	Year	Category	Nominee / Work	Result	Ref.
Asia Model Awards	2018	Rookie of the Year Award	GreatGuys	Won	
Asia Top Awards	2023	Rising Star Boy Band	GreatGuys	Won	
Issue Daily	2019	Bright New Artist Award	GreatGuys	Won	
