= Duodecet =

Musical ensemble consisting of 12 performers

In music, a duodecet—sometimes duodectet, or duodecimette—is a composition which requires twelve musicians for a performance, or a musical group that consists of twelve people. In jazz, such a group of twelve players is sometimes called a "twelvetet". The corresponding German word is Duodezett. The French equivalent form, douzetuor, is virtually unknown (in sharp contrast to dixtuor, the French word for decet). Unlike some other musical ensembles such as the string quartet, there is no established or standard set of instruments in a duodecet.

== History ==
Of the ensemble types named according to the number of musicians in the group, the decet, undecet, duodecet, tredecet, etc., are names less common in music than smaller groupings (quartet, quintet, etc., up to nonet). In the eighteenth century, twelve-part ensembles were most often encountered in the genre of the wind serenade, divertimento, nocturne, or partita—for example, Josef Reicha's Parthia ex D, for 2 flutes, 2 oboes, 2 clarinets, 3 horns, 2 bassoons, and double bass, and the partitas for the same instrumentation by Reicha's colleague Johann Georg Feldmayr. In fact, the titles "serenade" and "suite" continue through the 19th century to be the preferred term for ensembles of twelve or thirteen instruments, especially winds (e.g., Wilhelm Berger's Op. 102 for 12 winds, Felix Mendelssohn's Op. 24 for 11 or 12 winds, Max Reger's Serenade for 12 winds, or Richard Strauss's Opp. 4 and 7, for 13 winds). The word "duodecet" remains rare as a genre title in the 20th century (exceptions are found amongst the works of Polish composers Barbara Buczek and Bogusław Schaeffer), where works for twelve instruments or singers most often are given either a true title, or a genre title describing the form (e.g., "concertino", "suite", "variations"), often followed by a designator such as "for twelve instruments".

The three "twelve-part inventions", variations 3 (12 solo violins), 5 (10 violas and 2 double basses), and 11 (12 wind instruments), in Stravinsky's Variations: Aldous Huxley in memoriam (1963–64) have been designated "duodecets" by his biographer Eric Walter White.)

== Vocal duodecets ==
- Sylvano Bussotti. Siciliano, a francesco agnello, for twelve male voices (1960)

== String duodecets ==
- Julius Klengel. Hymnus für zwölf Violoncelli, Op. 57 (1920)
- Bojidar Abraschev. Prelude, Lied and Scherzo for 12 violoncellos (1994)
- Anne Boyd. Bencharong, for string ensemble of twelve players (1977), violins (7), violas (2), cellos (2) and double bass.
- Cesar Bresgen. Metamorphosis I (1983), for twelve strings: 7 violins, 2 violas, 2 violoncellos, and double bass
- Barbara Buczek. Duodecet for strings (1976)
- James Dillon. Introitus, for twelve strings (6 violins, 2 violas, 2 violoncellos, and 2 double basses), tape, and live electronics (1993)
- Helmut Eder. Concerto a dodici per archi, Op. 38 (1964)
- György Ligeti. Ramifications, for string orchestra or 12 solo strings (pub. 1970)
- Bogusław Schaeffer. Monophonie V, for 12 cellos (1999)
- Bogusław Schaeffer. Duodecet, for 12 cellos (2005)
- Thomas Simaku. Plenilunio, for twelve solo strings (7 violins, 2 violas, 2 violoncellos, and double bass) (1998)
- James Tenney. For 12 Strings (Rising), for 4 violins, 3 violas, 3 violoncellos, 2 double basses (1971)
- Ronald Tremain. Five Epigrams, for twelve solo strings (1964)

== Wind duodecets ==
- Milton Babbitt. Fanfare for 4 horns, 4 trumpets, 3 trombones, and tuba (1987)
- Wilhelm Berger. Serenade, Op. 102, for 2 flutes, 2 oboes, 2 clarinets, 4 horns, and 2 bassoons (1910)
- Gordon Jacob. Old Wine in New Bottles (1958), for double wind quintet with 2 trumpets
- Wilfred Josephs. Concerto a dodici, opus 21 (1960). Concerto for twelve wind instruments, flute, piccolo, oboe, cor anglais, clarinet, bassoon, double bassoon, horn, trumpet, trombone and tuba
- Karl Kohn. Concert Music for 12 wind instruments (1956)
- Felix Mendelssohn. Nocturno [alias Harmoniemusik, alias Overture], Op. 24, for flute, 2 oboes, 2 clarinets, 2 horns, 2 bassoons, trumpet, and (optional) "corno inglese di basso"
- Max Reger. Serenade for 12 wind instruments (Add two additional horns to the double wind quintet)
- David Van Vactor. Double sextette for 12 trombones (1971)

== Mixed duodecets ==
- Milton Babbitt. Composition for Twelve Instruments, for flute, oboe, clarinet, bassoon, horn, trumpet, harp, celesta, violin, viola, cello, and double bass (1948, rev. 1954)
- Niccolò Castiglioni. Masques: a Book of Dances, Chorales, Symphonies and Phantasies, for flute, oboe, clarinet, bassoon, horn, trumpet, piano, harmonium, 2 violins, viola, and cello (1966/1967).
- George Enescu. Chamber Symphony in E major, Op. 33, for flute, oboe, English horn, clarinet, bassoon, horn, trumpet, violin, viola, cello, contrabass, and piano (1954)
- Roman Haubenstock-Ramati. Musik für 12 Instrumente
- Hans Werner Henze. In memoriam: die Weisse Rose, Doppelfuge, for flute, English horn, bass clarinet, bassoon, horn, trumpet, trombone, 2 violins, viola, cello, and double bass (1965)
- Paul Hindemith. Kammermusik No. 1 with Finale 1921, Op. 24, No. 1, for flute (doubling piccolo), clarinet, bassoon, trumpet, percussionist, harmonium, piano, 2 violins, viola, cello, and double bass (1922)
- Tom Johnson. Voicings, for flute, oboe, clarinet, alto saxophone, bassoon, horn, trumpet, trombone, violin, viola, violoncello, and double bass (1984)
- Walter Kaufmann. Eight Pieces for Twelve Instruments, for piccolo, flute, oboe, clarinet, bass clarinet, bassoon, contrabassoon, harp, celesta, piano, percussion, and double bass (1966)
- Steve Reich. Double Sextet, for 2 flutes, 2 clarinets, 2 pianos, 2 vibraphones, 2 violins and 2 cellos; or flute, clarinet, piano, vibraphone, violin, cello and pre-recorded tape (2007)
- Josef Reicha. Parthia ex D, for 2 flutes, 2 oboes, 2 clarinets, 2 bassoons, 3 horns, and double bass
- Igor Stravinsky. Concertino, for flute, oboe, English horn, clarinet, 2 bassoons, 2 trumpets, tenor trombone, bass trombone, violin, and cello (1952; arr. of 1920 work for string quartet)
- Iannis Xenakis. Epicycle, for solo cello, flute, oboe, clarinet, horn, trumpet, trombone, tuba, 2 violins, viola, and double bass (1989)
