= List of compositions by Franz Lachner =

This is a partial list of compositions by Franz Lachner.

== Works with opus number ==
By opus number:

Opus no.	Name	Key	Earliest known date
1	Rondeau brillant for piano	A minor-A major	Published 1824 ca.
2	Piano Sonata	F♯ minor	Composed 1825, published 1826/27
3	Momento capriccioso for piano	A minor	Published 1824
8	Rondeau brillant for piano	E♭ major	c1823
12	Introduction et Variations sur un thême suisse pour piano et cor ou violoncelle	F major	?
14	Cello Sonata	A major	Composed 1826, published 1828 ca.
15	Introduction et variations brillantes sur un theme original for piano	E♭ major	Published 1827/28 or earlier
17	Rondeau Brillant for piano	B minor	Published 1828
20	Sonata for Piano 4-hands	C minor	Published by 1827
21	Nocturne No. 1 in French Style (for piano 4-hands)	E major	Published 1826
22	Deuxième Nocturne à quatre mains pour le Pianoforte sur de thêmes favoris de l’Opéra Oberon de C. M. de Weber	E♭ major	Published 1826
23	Morgenhymne. Chor f. Sopran, Alt, Tenor u. Bass m. willk. Begl. d. Pfte oder d. Physharmonica.	?	1829
25	Sonata for Piano	F major	Published 1828 or earlier
26	Three Scherzi for 4 Hands	D minor, E major, G major	Composed 1830
27	4 Lieder (texts by Heine, von Osten and Chamisso. Voice, cello (bassoon), piano)		1832 publication
28	Waldklänge (1, 2 for soprano, horn and piano, 3 for voice, violin and piano)	?	Published 1834
29	Serenade for four cellos	G minor-major	Composed and published 1829
30	Herbst, Verlangen, Bewußtsein – songs after Rellstab for voice, cello or horn & piano	?	Published 1832
31	Die vier Menschenalter, Cantata after Seidl for 3 solo voices, chorus, orchestra	?	Published 1835 (overture), 1836 (vocal score)
32	Symphony No. 1	E♭ major	1828
33	Sangerfährt (Bard's Journey), for voice and piano, to texts by Heinrich Heine	?	1831-2
34	3 Gedichte (texts by Heine. Voice, cello and piano)		published 1833
36	3 Deutsche Gesänge (voice, cello, piano. Heine & Uhland)		published 1833
39	Sonata, for piano four-hands	F major	1832 ca., published 1834
40	Der Sternenkranz for 4 Men's Voices	A major	Published 1835
41	Symphony No. 3	D minor	1834
44	Symphony No. 2	F major	Composed 1833
48	Deutsche Gesänge	n/a	1836
49	6 Deutsche Gesänge mit Begleitung des Piano Forte	n/a	1836
51	Geistliche lieder for voice and organ or piano	C minor/E♭	1837
52	Symphony No. 5 "Passionate/a"	C minor	1835, premiered 23 April 1839
52(a?) (may be a misprint for Op. 92)	Mass for voices, orchestra and organ	E♭	published 1844 (HMB 1845 but January 1845, so 1844)
54	6 deutsche Gesänge for baritone (or alto) and piano	n/a	pub. 1837
56	Symphony No. 6	D major (D major – B major – B minor – D)	published 1837
56 also	3 deutsche Gesänge	?	1838?
58	Erhörung, f. eine Singst. m. Begl. d. Pfte u. Vclle (od. Horn.) after Otto Prechler		1838, published 1839
58 also	Symphony No. 7	D minor	1839 or 1840
59	Frauenliebe und -leben (after Chamisso), song-cycle for voice, horn and piano	E major	1838, published 1839
59 also	Der Sänger am Rhein, 6 lieder for voice and piano		Published 1835
60	Der Sturm for chorus and optional piano	E-flat major	Published 1839
61	3 Gesänge von Koch	?	by 1860
62	Vorüber! (song to text by Otto Prechtler)	F minor	1840 or earlier (publication)
62 also	Introduction und Fuge für Piano-forte (or organ...) zu vier Händen	D minor	c. 1835
63	Vöglein mein Bote (songcycle, 3 songs) Die Armesünder-Blum. Die Männer sind mechant! 3 Lieder. (Vöglein flieg' fort – Am Kreuzweg wird begraben – Du sagtest mir es, Mutter.)	No. 1 is in C major with text by Johann Gabriel Seidl	1840
64-66	Gesänge für vier Männerstimmen		published 1842
70	3 Lieder for voice and piano	?	published 1842
71	3 songs for 4-part men's chorus	?	by 1843
71 (also)	Catarina Cornaro Königin von Cypern (Große Oper in 4 Ackten) (opera)	?	1841. Premiered Munich, 1841 (overture published 1843)
75	String Quartet No. 1	B minor	published in 1843 by Schott, Mainz.
76	String Quartet No. 2 (Allegro-Adagio-Scherzo-Allegro)	A major	Published 1843
77	String Quartet No. 3	E♭ major	1843 publication
77 also	3 Gesänge for 3 sopranos and piano		Published 1845
78	3 Gesänge for voice and piano		Published 1845
79	4 Gesänge for male chorus		Published 1845
80	Gesänge f. 3 Sopranstimmen m. Begl. d. Pfte. (in several volumes)	?	3rd volume published 1847
81	4 Lieder		1846 Published 1847
81 also	7 Lieder (different set)		1845
82	Frauenliebe und -leben (after Chamisso) Song-cycle for soprano, clarinet and piano. Arrangement of Op. 59.	?	Published 1847
84	7 Lieder for Bass	?	pub. 1847
85	Psalm 63 for female chorus and piano or harp	E♭ major	pub. 1847
86	3 Gedichte von F. Rückert, f. 2 Singstimmen m. Pftebegl.	?	pub. 1847
88	Mass	?	pub. 1847
88 also	4 Gedichte for chorus	?	pub. 1847
89	Kriegers Gebet for male chorus and military band	E♭ major	pub. 1847
90	15 Vespers for Chorus and Organ (Psalmi Vespertini)	?	Manuscript, possibly unpublished. An 1850 manuscript copy exists
91	Der 133te Psalm (for 4 women's voices)	B major	pub. 1849
92	Mass for two "voix égales" (of the same vocal type) and organ	E♭	1847
93	3 Gedichte von Dräxler-Manfred f. vierstimmigen Männerchor (with piano or wind)	?	pub. 1848
94	3 Gedichte for male chorus	?	pub. 1849
96	Sängerfahrt, 18 songs for voice and piano	?	pub. 1851-52
97	6 vocal duets	?	by 1860
98	Mass for soloists, chorus, orchestra and organ	E♭	?
99	Three canons for three sopranos and piano	?	1853 Published 1855
100	Symphony No. 8	G minor	(1851?) Published by 1855
101	3 Lieder for voice and piano, to text by Emanuel Geibel: Des Müden Abendlied; Die junge Nonne; Schmetterling	unknown	1856 (pub.)
102	3 Psalmen for 2 choruses		1856 (pub.)
103	Festchor zu Mozart's Säkularfeier for 2 bassoons, brass, timpani	E♭ major	pub. 1857
104	Siegesgesang aus Hermannschlacht by Friedrich Gottlieb Klopstock for male chorus and wind band	B minor-B major	1856
105	3 Gesänge for 3 Women's Voices and piano	?	1857
106	6 Duets after L. Koch for soprano, alto and piano	?	1857
107	4 Poems by L. Koch for vocal quartet	?	1858
108	3 Quartets for Women's Voices	?	by 1860
109	6 Piano Pieces (ded. to Betty Schott)	n/a	1858
110	12 Gesänge: für Sopran, Alt, Tenor & Baß	?	by 1860
111	12 Lieder for soprano (or tenor) and piano	?	1861
112	Sturmesmythe after Nikolaus Lenau for Men's Chorus and Orchestra	C major	1861
113	Suite No. 1 for Orchestra	D minor	1861
114	3 Chöre for male chorus		1863 publication
115	Suite No. 2 for Large Orchestra	E minor	1863?
116	4 Lieder for voice and piano(texts by von Fallersleben)		1863 publication
117	Psalm 150 for male chorus and orchestra	E♭ major	1863
118	Bundeslied, for Men's Chorus, to words by Theodor Heigel	E♭ major	1864 ca.
119	Drei Gedichte von L. Koch	?	Published 1865
120	String Quartet No. 4	D minor	published in 1849?? (A search of HMB gives 1866 which seems more likely)
121	String Quintet (quartet plus contrabass)	C minor	pub. 1864
122	Suite No. 3 for Large Orchestra	F minor	published 1866
123	Festlied for male chorus and wind band	E♭ major	Published 1867
128	Drei Lieder für Männerstimmen	?	Published 1867
129	Suite No. 4 for Large Orchestra	E♭ major	1865? by 1866.
130	Mass for two choirs and soloists	F major	1872
131	2 Motetten (1 for soprano and chorus, 2 for chorus)		Published 1872
132	Ave Maria (soprano, small choir, small ensemble)	?	1870
133	Ave Maria for alto, 2 violas, 2 cellos and double Bass, or alto and organ	G major	1869
134	6 Lieder for voice and piano		Published 1868
135	Suite No. 5 for Large Orchestra	C minor	published in 1868
136	Zigeunerlied for bass, male chorus and piano	G minor	Published 1868
136 also	An die Nacht for male chorus	E♭ major	Published 1869
137 (WulL G9)	Gebet after a text by Emanuel Geibel (for voice, 2 violins, 2 cellos and bass, or voice and organ or melodium)	C major	1870
138	Variations for Piano 4-Hands	E minor	published 1869
139	Piano Quintet No. 1	C minor	published 1870
140	Suite for Piano and Violin (or Violoncello)	A minor	published in 1870
140 also	Abendfriede von Lenau für Männerchor und Orchester	?	ca. 1870?
141	4 Gesänge for male chorus or 3 voices	?	Published 1870
142	Suite for Piano	C minor	published in the 1860s
143	Fest-marsch für Blech-instrumente (brass and drums)	E♭ major	by 1873
145	Piano Quintet No. 2	A minor	1869
146	Requiem	F minor	1856, revised 1865 published 1871
149	Gebet for 2 sopranos and organ	F major	1868
150	Suite for Orchestra No. 6	C major	published 1872
152	Six Songs for Alto with Piano	n/a?	by 1872
153	Horch! Die Vesper-Hymne Klingt for 2 choruses	F major	Published 1861
154	Stabat Mater for Mixed Choir a cappella	?	1872
155	Mass for 5 Part Chorus (S/A/T/2B), Soloists, and Organ ad lib.	D minor	by 1872
156	Octet	B♭	published by 1850?
160	Elegie: Quintet for 5 Cellos	1834	1872
161	Psalm 30 (soprano and orchestra, or piano, or organ)	?	1873
162	Ave Maria for Soprano, chorus & accompaniment (new edition of Op. 132)	F major	Published 1873
163	Psalm 26 (bass voice and orchestra, or piano, or organ)	?	1873
166	Abend-Elegie : für eine Tenorstimme, Violine und Orgel oder Harmonium oder Pianoforte	?	ca. 1880
167	3 Chöre for male chorus	?	1874
168	Stabat Mater for female chorus, 2 violas, 2 cellos and double bass, or female chorus and organ or physharmonika	?	Published by J.Aibl in mid-1870s?
169	String Quartet No. 5	G major	Published in 1875
169 also	9 Gesänge for chorus		Published 1875
170	Ball-Suite for orchestra	D major	by 1875
172	6 Piano Pieces	n/a	1876
173	String Quartet No. 6	E minor	1848-9
175	Organ Sonata No. 1	F minor	1877
176	Organ Sonata No. 2	C Major	1877
177	Organ Sonata No. 3	E minor	1877
178	4 Gesänge for 2 female voices		1875
179	Hornesklänge (for Male chorus and winds)	E♭ major	Published 1877
180	Martini Kirchweihe for baritone and male chorus	E minor	Published 1877
181	Kriegsgesang for Men's Voices and Orchestra after Cavallo.	?	1877
182	Gruß des Regensburger Liederkranzes an die Festgenossen for male chorus	?	Published 1877
184	3 Lieder for 2 voices and piano	?	?
185	4 Gesänge for 4 voices	?	1879
186	4 Gesänge for 4 voices	?	1880
187	6 Songs for 4 Female Voices	n/a	1880s?
190	Suite No. 7 for Orchestra	D minor	1881
191	Partsongs for male chorus	n/a	Published 1885

== Works without opus number ==
Name	Key	Earliest known date
Concertino for Bassoon and Orchestra	E♭ major	1824
Fantasie for Horn and Piano	F minor	1825
Fantasie for Piano	F♯ minor	Composed 1877
Festhymne zur Enthüllung des König Ludwigs Denkmal for voices and wind band	?	Composed 1862 ca.
Frühlingsnähe for voice and piano	F major	Composed 1844
5 Lieder for Voice, Cello and Piano	?	Composed 1851
4 Lieder for Voice, Cello (or horn) and Piano	?	Published 1832
March for piano	E♭ major	Composed 1863 or earlier
Wind Quintet No. 1	F major	1823
Wind Quintet No. 2	E♭ major	1827
Septet	E♭ major	1824 (completed by Franz Beyer)
Die Liebesboten (song, text by Heinrich Heine)	A minor	1826
Festouvertüre	E-♭ major	1854
Flute Concerto	D minor	1832
Harp Concerto	D minor	?
Andante for Brass Instruments	A♭ major	Composed 1833
Moses (oratorio)	?	1833?
Andante for orchestra	D major	Composed 1837?
Ave Maria for soprano and harp	B♭ major	?
9 Entreactes for orchestra	?	Composed 1826
Symphony No. 4	E major	1834
Psalm 134	?	1870?
Psalm 42 for chorus	D minor	Composed 1837
Nonet	F major	1875
Piano Trio	C minor	Composed 1829
Piano Trio	E major	Composed 1828
Praeludium for piano	A minor	Published 1877
Rêverie	G major	Published 1887
Seebild for voice and piano	F major	Published 1856
Die stille Nacht for voice and piano	F major	Published 1883
Zur Grundsteinlegung des K. Maximilaneums for male chorus and wind band	E♭ major	Composed 1857 ca.
Notte Soave Delizia for alto, horn and piano (Italian version of Op. 58, Erhörung)	?	1838-40?
Cantate Domino canticum novum for 4 voices, orchestra, WulL C2 (manuscript)	E♭ major	1830?
Fantasy for Piano	?	1885?
String Quartet	E♭ major	1824
Elegy for flute and organ	?	1879

== Notes ==
Sources

- Bussenius, Arthur Friedrich (1856) (in German). Die Componisten der neueren Zeit: Adam, Auber, Beethoven ... ; in Biographien geschildert. Franz, Vincenz, Ignaz Lachner, vol. 39. Ernst Balde Verlag.
- Kronseder, Otto (1903) (in German). Franz Lachner, Breitkopf & Härtel
- Wulf, Jürgen (1999) (in German). Die Geistliche Vokalmusik Franz Lachners: Biographische und stilistische Untersuchungen mit thematischem Verzeichnis. Hildesheim: Georg Olms Verlag. ISBN 3-487-10863-1.
