= Decet (music) =

Musical group that consists of ten people

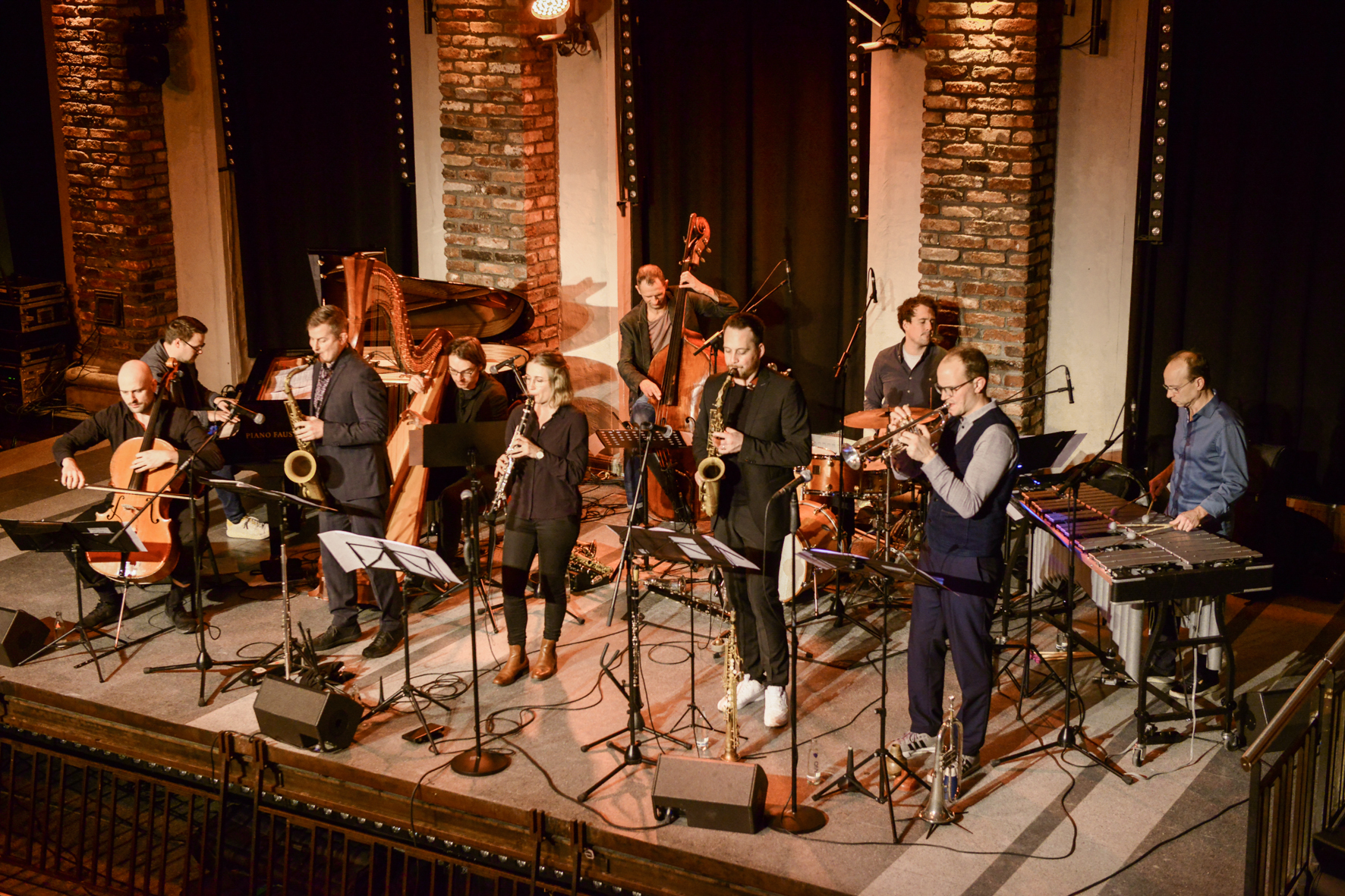
Rebecca Trescher Tentet Live, jazzMeeting, Wuppertal (2021)

In music, a decet—sometimes dectet, decimet, decimette, or even tentet—is a composition that requires ten musicians for a performance, or a musical group that consists of ten people. The corresponding German word is Dezett, the French is dixtuor. Unlike some other musical ensembles such as the string quartet, there is no established or standard set of instruments in a decet.

== History ==
Of the ensemble types named according to the number of musicians in the group, the decet and the larger undecet, duodecet, etc., are names less common in music than smaller groupings. In the eighteenth century, ten-part ensembles were most often encountered in the genre of the wind serenade, or divertimento (for example, Mozart, K. 186 and 166, both for 2 oboes, 2 clarinets, 2 cor anglais, 2 horns, and 2 bassoons). Because the wind-serenade tradition was carried on during the 19th century primarily in France, the term dixtuor is somewhat more widely used in French than is its English equivalent, and French works figure most prominently in this ten-instrument configuration—most commonly the double wind quintet. One of the earliest examples to use the English term is the Decet for oboe, clarinet, horn, bassoon, piano, 2 violins, viola, cello, and contrabass (ca. 1841) by John Henry Griesbach (1798–1875). Perhaps the best-known work in this genre from the nineteenth century is Joachim Raff's Sinfonietta for ten winds, Op. 188.

== Wind decets ==
- Denis ApIvor, Vista, Op. 77, for double wind quintet (1983)
- Malcolm Arnold, Trevelyan Suite, Op. 96, for 3 flutes, 2 oboes, 2 clarinets, 2 horns, and cello (or 2 bassoons) (1967)
- Claude Arrieu, Dixtuor pour instruments à vent (1967) for flute, piccolo, oboe, 2 clarinets, 2 bassoons, horn, trumpet, and trombone.
- Andre Caplet, Suite Persane, pour dixtuor d'instruments à vent, for 2 flutes, 2 oboes, 2 clarinets, 2 bassoons, and 2 horns.
- Francis Casadesus, London Sketches, petite suite humoristique, pour dixtuor d'instruments à vent, for 2 flutes, 2 oboes, 2 clarinets, 2 bassoons, and 2 horns.
- Anna Clyne (2020), Overflow, for 2 flutes, 2 oboes, 2 clarinets, 2 bassoons, and 2 horns.
- George Enescu, Decet, Op. 14 (1906), for 2 flutes, oboe, English horn, 2 clarinets, 2 horns, and 2 bassoons.
- Jean Françaix, Sept danses, from the ballet Les Malheurs de Sophie (1970)
- Jean Françaix, Neuf pièces caractéristiques (1973)
- Rudolf Koumans, Dekaphonie, Op. 98, for 2 flutes, 2 oboes, 2 clarinets, 2 horns, and 2 bassoons
- Jonathan Harvey, Serenade in homage to Mozart, for ten wind players (2 flutes (1 doubling piccolo), 2 oboes, 2 clarinets (1 doubling bass clarinet), 2 bassoons and 2 horns) (1991)
- Alan Hovhaness, Tower Music, Op. 129, for flute, oboe, clarinet, bassoon, 2 horns, 2 trumpets, trombone, and tuba (1954)
- Tilo Medek, Decet, for double wind quintet (second flute doubling piccolo, second oboe doubling cor anglais, second clarinet doubling bass clarinet, second bassoon doubling contrabassoon) (1993)
- Grace-Evangeline Mason (2023), The Water Garden, for 2 flutes, 2 oboes, 2 clarinets, 2 bassoons, and 2 horns, and harp.
- Darius Milhaud, Cinq symphonies pour petit orchestre. V: Dixtuor d'instruments à vent, Op. 75 (1921), for piccolo, flute, oboe, English horn, clarinet, bass clarinet, 2 bassoons, 2 horns.
- Lior Navok, Tetris (2009), for 2 flutes, 2 oboes, 2 clarinets, 2 horns, and 2 bassoons.
- Joachim Raff, Sinfonietta, Op. 188, for 2 flutes, 2 oboes, 2 clarinets, 2 horns, and 2 bassoons.
- Ronald Roseman, Double Quintet, for woodwinds and brass (flute, oboe, clarinet, bassoon, 2 horns, 2 trumpets, trombone, and tuba or bass trombone)
- Florent Schmitt, Lied et Scherzo, Op. 54 (1910), for double woodwind quintet (with the principal horn as a featured soloist)
- Gunther Schuller, Double Quintet, for woodwinds and brass (flute, oboe, clarinet, bassoon, 2 horns, 2 trumpets, trombone, and tuba)
- Jeff Scott, Sacred Women for 2 flutes (2 doubling alto flute), 2 oboes, 2 clarinets (2 doubling bass clarinet), 2 horns, 2 bassoons.
- James Tenney, Sonata for ten wind instruments (piccolo, flute, oboe, B♭ clarinet, E♭ alto saxophone, bassoon, B♭ trumpet, horn, trombone, and tuba) (1959, rev. 1983)
- Guy Woolfenden, Reflections: Serenade no. 2 for 2 flutes, 2 oboes, 2 clarinets, 2 horns, 2 bassoons.

== String decets ==
- Thom Carling, Faux Pas (1979), for ten cellos
- Jean Françaix, Scuola di celli (1994), for ten cellos
- Teppo Hauta-aho, Hippoes Chorale, Lullaby, and Scherzo (1981), for ten cellos
- Håkan Larsson, Aubade – Notturno (2001), for ten cellos
- Darius Milhaud, Cinq symphonies pour petit orchestre. IV: Dixtuor à cordes, Op. 74 (1921), for 4 violins, 2 violas, 2 violoncellos & 2 double basses.
- Leif Segerstam, Ballade (1992), for ten cellos

== Mixed-instrument decets ==
- Benjamin Britten, Sinfonietta, Op. 1 (1932), for flute, oboe, clarinet, horn, bassoon, 2 violins, viola, violoncello, and double bass.
- Sven-Erik Bäck, Decet (1972), for wind quintet and string quintet.
- Donte Davis, Decet No. 1 in D Minor, Op. 53 (2010), for flute, oboe, clarinet, horn, bassoon, 2 violins, viola, violoncello, and double bass.
- Donte Davis, Decet No. 2 in G Minor, Op. 58 (2017), for 3 violins, 3 violas, 3 violoncellos, and double bass.
- Théodore Dubois, Dixtuor (1906), for flute, oboe, clarinet, horn, bassoon, 2 violins, viola, violoncello, and double bass.
- Jean Françaix, Dixtuor (1986), for flute, oboe, clarinet, horn, bassoon, 2 violins, viola, violoncello, and double bass.
- Jean Françaix, Onze variations sur un thème de Haydn (1982), for 9 winds and double bass.
- Pierre Hasquenoph, Divertissement, for flute, oboe, clarinet, bassoon, horn, 2 violins, viola, violoncello, and double bass.
- Gustav Helsted, Decet Op. 18 (1891), for flute, oboe, clarinet, horn, bassoon, 2 violins, viola, violoncello, and double bass.
- György Ligeti, Fragment, for contrabassoon, bass trombone, contrabass tuba, percussion, harp, piano, harpsichord, and three contrabasses (1961, rev. 1964)
- Jerzy Maksymiuk, Decet, for flute, oboe, clarinet, bassoon, horn, piano, violin, viola, violoncello, and double bass.
- Robert Moevs, Musica da camera, for flute/piccolo, clarinet (A/E♭/B♭), horn, 3 percussionists, harp, violin, viola, and cello (listed by Moevs’s publisher, Edward B. Marks Music Company, under decet)
- Steve Reich, 2 × 5, for 4 electric guitars, 2 bass guitars, 2 drum sets, and 2 pianos (2010)
- Staffan Rejle, Decet for flute, oboe, clarinet, bassoon, horn, 2 violins, viola, cello, and double bass (1998)
- Bogusław Schaeffer, Decet: for harp, prepared piano, violoncello, percussion (2 performers), vibraphone, marimba, bassoon, trombone, and double bass
- Peter Seabourne, Chamber Concerto No. 1 Adrift, for flute, oboe, clarinet, bassoon, horn, 2 violins, viola, cello, and double bass (2008)
- Peter Seabourne, Chamber Concerto No. 2 Phantasy Caprices, for flute, oboe, clarinet, bassoon, horn, violin, viola, cello, double bass, and piano (2009)
- Karlheinz Stockhausen, Kontra-Punkte, for flute, clarinet, bass clarinet, bassoon, trumpet, trombone, piano, harp, violin, and cello (1952–1953)
- Antoine Tisné, Caractères, for wind quintet, string quintet and percussion, for flute, oboe, clarinet, bassoon, horn, percussion (1 player), 2 violins, viola, violoncello, and double bass.
- Robert Washburn, Concertino, for flute, oboe, 2 clarinets, bassoon, 2 trumpets, horn, trombone, and tuba. (1965)
- Iannis Xenakis,
  - Atrées, for flute, clarinet, bass clarinet, horn, trumpet, trombone, 2 percussionists, violin, and cello (1962)
  - Amorsima-Morsima, for clarinet, bass clarinet, 2 horns, harp, percussion, and string quartet (1962)
  - ST/10, for clarinet, bass clarinet, 2 horns, harp, percussion, 2 violins, viola, and cello (1956–1962)

== Opera ==
- Pyotr Ilyich Tchaikovsky, The Enchantress, Act I, No. 7a/i, Decimet a cappella (1885–1887)
