= Symphony No. 1 (Milhaud) =

Symphony by Darius Milhaud

The Symphony No. 1, Op. 210, by Darius Milhaud is a work for orchestra composed in France in 1939, during a period of illness and anxiety following the outbreak of World War II. Nearly fifty years old at the time and already a very prolific and mature composer, Milhaud had never attempted a symphony before. In spite of his expressed antipathy toward the "German music" typified by the symphony, he accepted a commission for this work from the Chicago Symphony Orchestra, then approaching its 50th anniversary. Milhaud went on to write twelve more numbered symphonies by 1963.

In spite of the trying circumstances in which it was written, Milhaud's First Symphony is a bright, optimistic work in its composer's unique neo-classical style. With a total running time of some 24 minutes, the piece's four movements are:

1. Pastoral. Modérément animé (approx. 7')
2. Très vif (approx. 4'30")
3. Très modéré (approx. 6'30")
4. Final. Animé (approx. 6'20")

This symphony, which is not to be confused with Milhaud's Little Symphony No.1 "Le printemps", Op.43 (1917), is published by Heugel & Cie.

== Recordings ==
- a 1943 mono recording on the Guild label, featuring the NBC Symphony Orchestra conducted by Leopold Stokowski
- a 1956 mono recording made by GDR Radio, featuring the Berlin Radio Symphony Orchestra conducted by Rolf Kleinert
- a 1991 digital recording by Michel Plasson and the Toulouse Capitole Orchestra, on Deutsche Grammophon
- a 1995 digital recording by Alun Francis and the Radio-Sinfonieorchester Basel, part of a boxed set of Milhaud's Symphonies No. 1-12 on CPO
