= Barbara Buczek =

Polish composer (1940–1993)

- Barbara Buczek, c. 1960
- Born: 9 January 1940; Kraków, German-occupied Poland
- Died: 17 January 1993 (aged 53); Kraków, Poland
- Occupations: Composer, music teacher

Barbara Buczek (9 January 1940 – 17 January 1993) was a Polish composer and music teacher who taught at the Academy of Music in Kraków.

== Early life and education ==
Barbara Buczek was born on 9 January 1940 in Kraków. She began learning to play the piano under her father's instruction, She studied with Kazimierz Mirski and Maria Bilińska-Regierowa at the State Music School (now the Academy of Music) in Kraków, and graduated from the latter's piano class in 1959. Buczek then continued her piano studies with Ludwik Stefański from 1959 to 1965, before studying composition with Bogusław Schaeffer between 1969 and 1974. She graduated with distinction from both classes.

== Career ==
Buczek stayed at the State Music School as a teacher, and taught piano, counterpoint and composition there. She remained as a teacher at the school until her death. Buczek wrote compositions with such intricate textures and complexity that it was almost impossible to play all the intricacies of the piece; she referred to these pieces as having the "charm of impossibility".

Buczek won various awards for her music during her career, including third place at the G. Fitelberg Composition Competition in 1970 in Katowice for "Two Impressions", an award at the N. Paganini International Composition Competition in Rome in 1982 for "Violin Concerto" and third place at the International Composition Competition in Vienna in 1985 for "String Quartet No.2 Transgressio". Buczek also participated in the International Composers' Seminar in Boswil and was a member of the Frau und Musik and Grupa Krakowska artistic associations.

Buczek presented her doctoral dissertation at Maria Curie-Skłodowska University in 1990, and defended it with her thesis "Meeting of contemporary music with plastic arts as a problem of philosophy of culture. The years 1945-1990".

== Death ==
Buczek died in Kraków on 17 January 1993, at the age of 53.

== Works ==
- Sonata breve per pianoforte (1968) 5'20" (Ariadne)
- Mikrosonata for violin solo (1968) 2'45" (Ariadne)
- Study No. 1, for flute (1968) 4'10" (Ariadne)
- String Quartet no. 1 (1968) 8'18"
- Quintet for wind instruments (1969) 7'20" (Ariadne)
- Intermezzo for piano and instruments (1969) 5'50"
- Koncert wokalny [Vocal Concerto] for twelve solo voices (1969)
- Fuga
- Study for violin solo (1970) 2'40" (Ariadne)
- Metafonie for large orchestra (1970) 7'20"
- Quintet (1971) 3'50"
- Musica per tredici strumenti (1971) 3'10"
- Labyrinth, for large orchestra (1974)
- Anekumena – Concerto for 89 instruments (1974) (PWM)
- Sextet for flute, viola, cello, soprano and two pianos (1974) 10'50" (Ariadne)
- Assemblage for alto flute and string orchestra (1975) 7'
- Simplex for orchestra (1976) 8'20"
- Eidos I for violin solo (1977) 4'2" (PWM/Ariadne)
- Eidos II (version 1) for tuba solo (1977) 11'30"
- Hipostaza I, for soprano, flute, alto saxophone, cello, and vibraphone (1978) 10'30"
- Eidos III for bassoon solo (1979) 6'20" (Ariadne)
- Violin Concerto (1979) 15'50" (Ariadne)
- Désunion, for soprano and contrabass (one performer, 1982)
- Eidos II (version 2) for tuba and piano (1984)
- Motet for instruments, recitor, baritone and tape (1984) 16'50"
- String Quartet No. 2 Transgressio (1985) 10'25" (PWM)
- Primus inter pares, for horn and 6 instruments (or for flute, soprano sax, bass clarinet, violin and bass) (1985) (10')
- Dikolon, for orchestra (1985) 15'10"
- Concerto for cello, choir and orchestra (1986)
- Hipostaza II, for string sextet (1987)
- Les sons ésotériques, for flute, computer and tape (1989)
- Study No. 1 for flute solo (1990) (Ariadne)
- Les accords ésotériques, for piano (1991) (Ariadne)
- Eidos IV, for piano (1991) (Ariadne)
- Intermezzo, for piano (1992)
