= Sinfonietta (Zemlinsky) =

1934 orchestral work by Alexander Zemlinsky

The Sinfonietta, Op. 23, is a composition for orchestra by Austrian composer Alexander Zemlinsky.

== Composition and performance ==
The work was composed in 1934, partly in response to a suggestion from Zemlinsky's publishers Universal Edition who had encouraged the composer to write “an orchestral work, short and practical in its requirements...”. The work was first performed in Prague on 19 February 1935, conducted by Heinrich Jalowetz. The composer himself conducted further performances in Vienna, Paris, Barcelona and Lausanne. The American premiere was given on 29 December 1940 by the New York Philharmonic Symphony Orchestra conducted by Dimitri Mitropoulos.

== Structure and style ==
The work is in three movements:

1. Sehr lebhaft
2. Ballade (Sehr gemessen)
3. Rondo (Sehr lebhaft)

The Sinfonietta is a characteristic work of Zemlinsky's late style, with its clear-cut orchestration, predominantly contrapuntal textures and rhythmic energy characteristic of Neue Sachlichkeit.

The work has a performance duration of approximately 20 minutes.

== Instrumentation ==
The work is scored for an orchestra consisting of: two flutes (second doubling piccolo), two oboes (second doubling cor anglais), two clarinets (second doubling E flat clarinet), two bassoons, four horns, three trumpets, three trombones, timpani, percussion (xylophone, glockenspiel, cymbals, side drum, tom-tom, triangle, tambourine), harp, and strings.
