= Nonet (Lachner) =

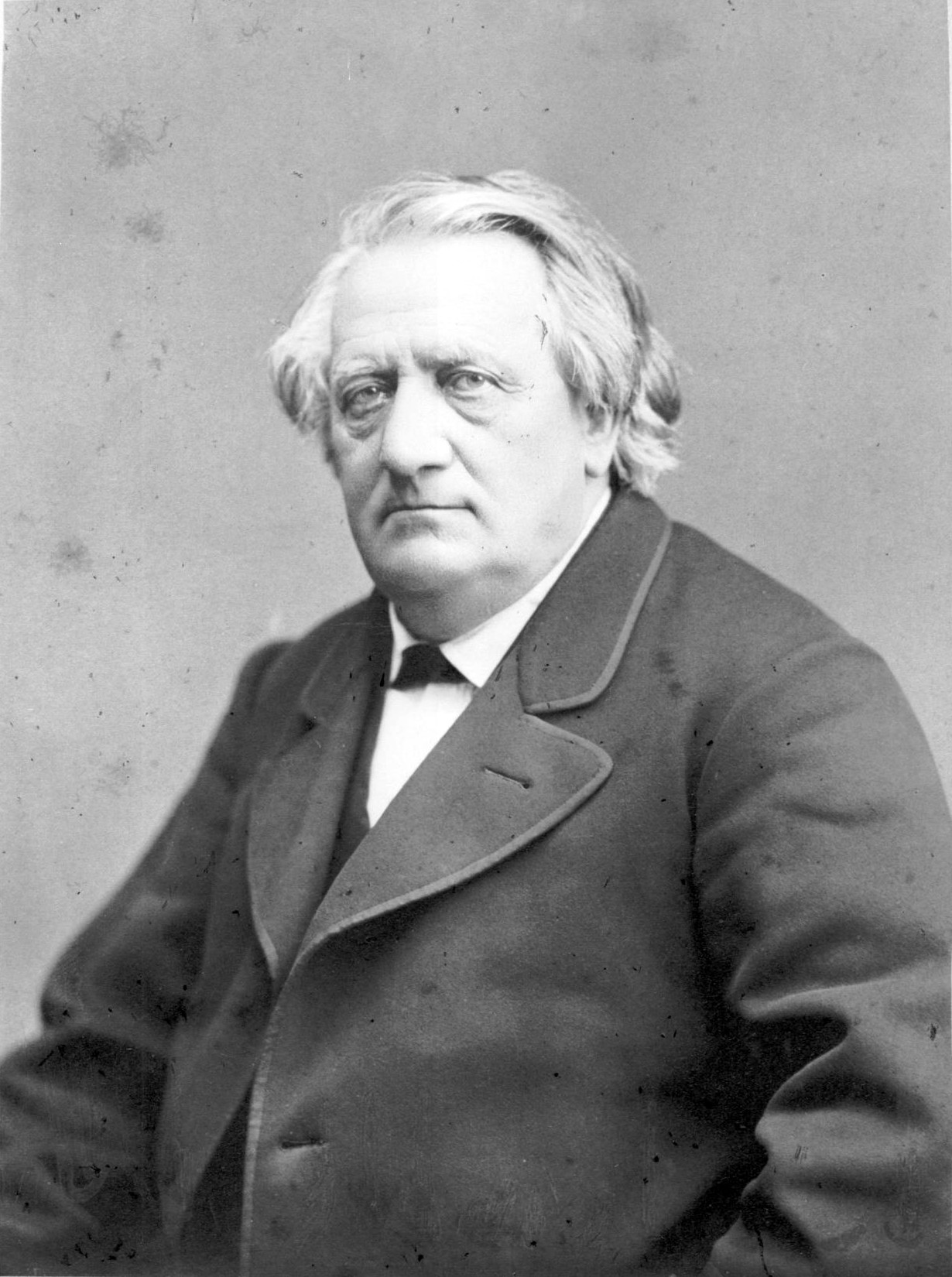
Franz Lachner

Franz Lachner’s Nonet in F major is a composition for chamber ensemble published in 1875.

The precise circumstances under which Lachner composed the Nonet are undocumented, leading to speculation on just when and for whom it was composed. De Alvaré in his thesis speculates that the Nonet was composed shortly after Lachner retired from conducting and that the intended recipients were not dissimilar to those for whom Beethoven composed the Septet Op. 20. Ussi in his article agrees with de Alvaré regarding the intended audience and performers, but disagrees with the dating of the composition, believing instead based purely on stylistic grounds that the piece may have been written in the 1820s or 1830s and then completed for publication in the 1870s.

== Music ==
The composition is scored for flute, oboe, clarinet, bassoon, horn, violin, viola, cello, and double bass.

The composition is in four movements:

1. Andante – Allegro moderato
2. Menuetto: Allegro moderato
3. Adagio
4. Allegro ma non troppo
