= Little Symphony No. 2 (Milhaud) =

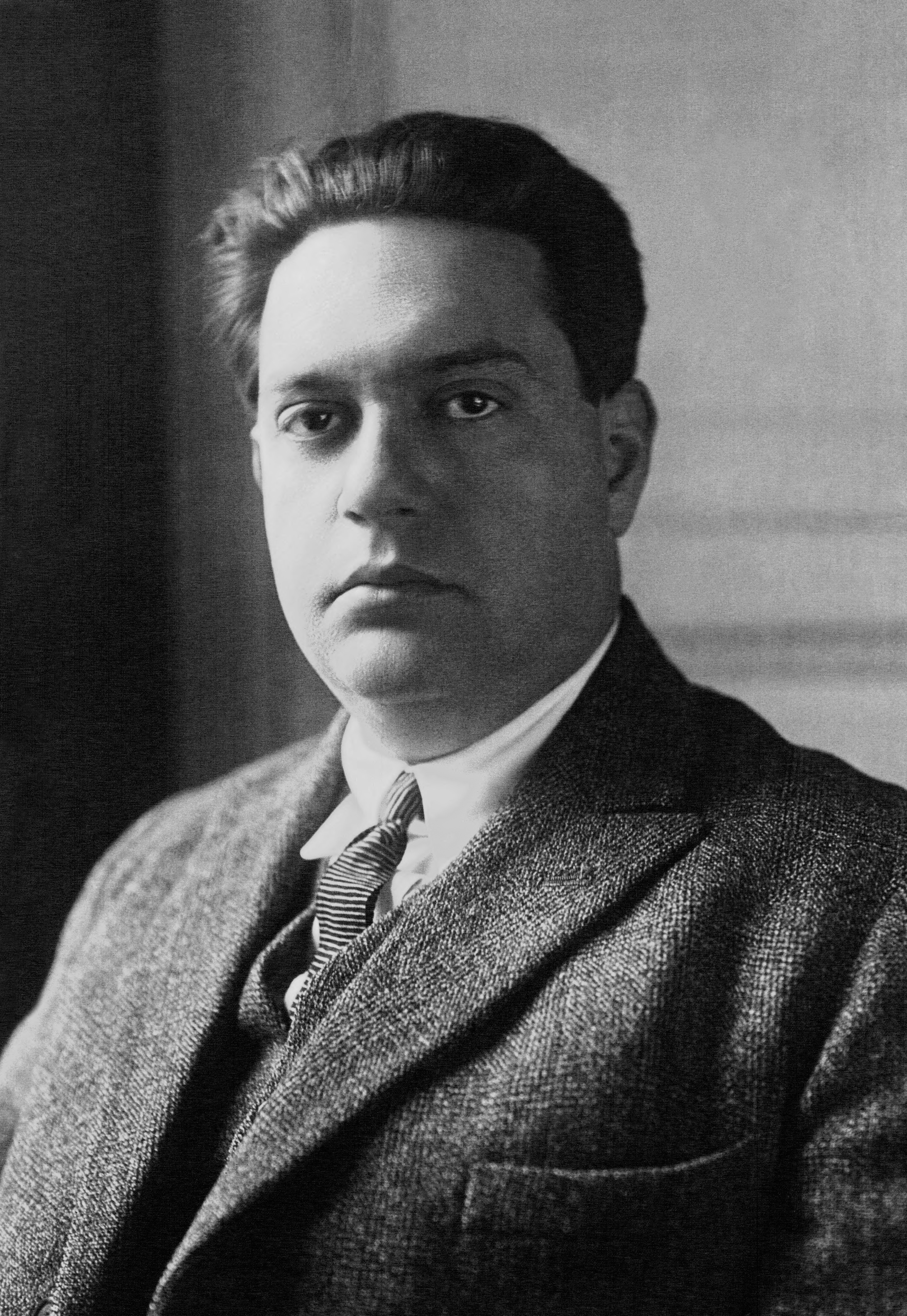
Darius Milhaud in 1923

The Little (Chamber) Symphony No. 2, Op. 49, by Darius Milhaud (not to be confused with his Symphony No. 2) is a three-movement piece written for chamber orchestra, consisting of flute, English horn, bassoon, violin, viola, cello, and double bass. The piece is dedicated to "Roseau et Pipeau," which are terms that refer to various types of flute are associated with pastoral themes in music.

Milhaud composed this piece in 1918, one year after his First Chamber Symphony. It was fairly early in his composing career, while he was still employed as a secretary to the French ambassador to Brazil. Milhaud wrote this short symphony at sea, during a return voyage to France. Influences of Latin American rhythms and references to South America’s picturesque landscape are present throughout the piece.

This symphony was published by Universal, and it premiered in 1919 in Delgrange, Paris.

== Music ==
Despite slightly disconcerting polytonality, the three movements of the piece maintain traditional pastoral ambience, evoking images of nature through the various topoi (ideas symbolically suggested by the sounds of various instruments).

1. Joyeux
2. Calme
3. Joyeux

Wind and string phrases generally begin and end at regular, coordinated intervals, even as they oppose each other harmonically and rhythmically.

=== I. Joyeux ===
The first movement is a frolicsome piece in ternary form that juxtaposes duple and triple meters between strings and woodwinds. Played separately, the soaring melodies of the flute and the English horn are typical of the romantic period but are contrasted with the aggressive double bass line. However, as is typical of Milhaud’s polyphony, the voices sound fairly cacophonic when played simultaneously. The movement frantically climaxes and suddenly ends, following a quick run in the woodwinds.

=== II. Calme ===
The second movement lives up to its name in style. An English horn solo opens the piece, playing over a smooth bassoon part and muted strings which bring to mind a babbling brook. The flute enters to rhythmically support (and harmonically oppose) the other woodwinds, all while the strings' rhythms are augmented, turning simple arpeggio patterns into textural body. This thins out after the strings' trill, with ornamental figures in the woodwinds that decrease in length and volume to the tranquil end of the movement.

=== III. Joyeux ===
The third movement is a mixed-meter movement, defined by the constant repetition (ostinato) of the flute's simple four-measure phrase. The woodwinds' playfully articulated polytonal melodies are supported by rhythmically-driven string parts, both based on duple subdivisions. Woodwind melodies are individually pleasant-sounding, but they do not match up harmonically. Throughout the movement, the melody alternates between instruments, most notably in the violin's birdcall phrases, which define the contours of the movement. The movement crescendos to a forte melody in the double bass and violin, and from there decrescendos to the end.

Overall, the movement is reminiscent of Igor Stravinsky’s L’Histoire du soldat, which premiered in 1918.

== Recordings ==
- Milhaud, Darius, Karl Anton. Rickenbacher, Darius Milhaud, and Capella Cracoviensis. 1992. 6 Petites Symphonies - 3 Op Ras Minutes. Koch International.
- Milhaud, Darius, Bernard. Dekaise, Darius Milhaud, Ensemble des temps modernes, and Conservatoire royal de musique de Liège. 1992. Symphonies De Chambre N8 1, 2, 3, 5: L'enlèvement D'Europe; L'homme Et Son Désir. France?: Adda.
- Milhaud, Darius, and Naxos Digital Services US. 1994. MILHAUD: Symphonie De Chambre Nos. 1-6 / Le Boeuf Sur Le Toit / Suite Cisalpine. Naxos Music Library; Naxos Music Library. Hong Kong: Naxos Digital Services US Inc. http://univportal.naxosmusiclibrary.com/catalogue/item.asp?cid=CDX-5109.
