= Petite Symphonie (Gounod) =

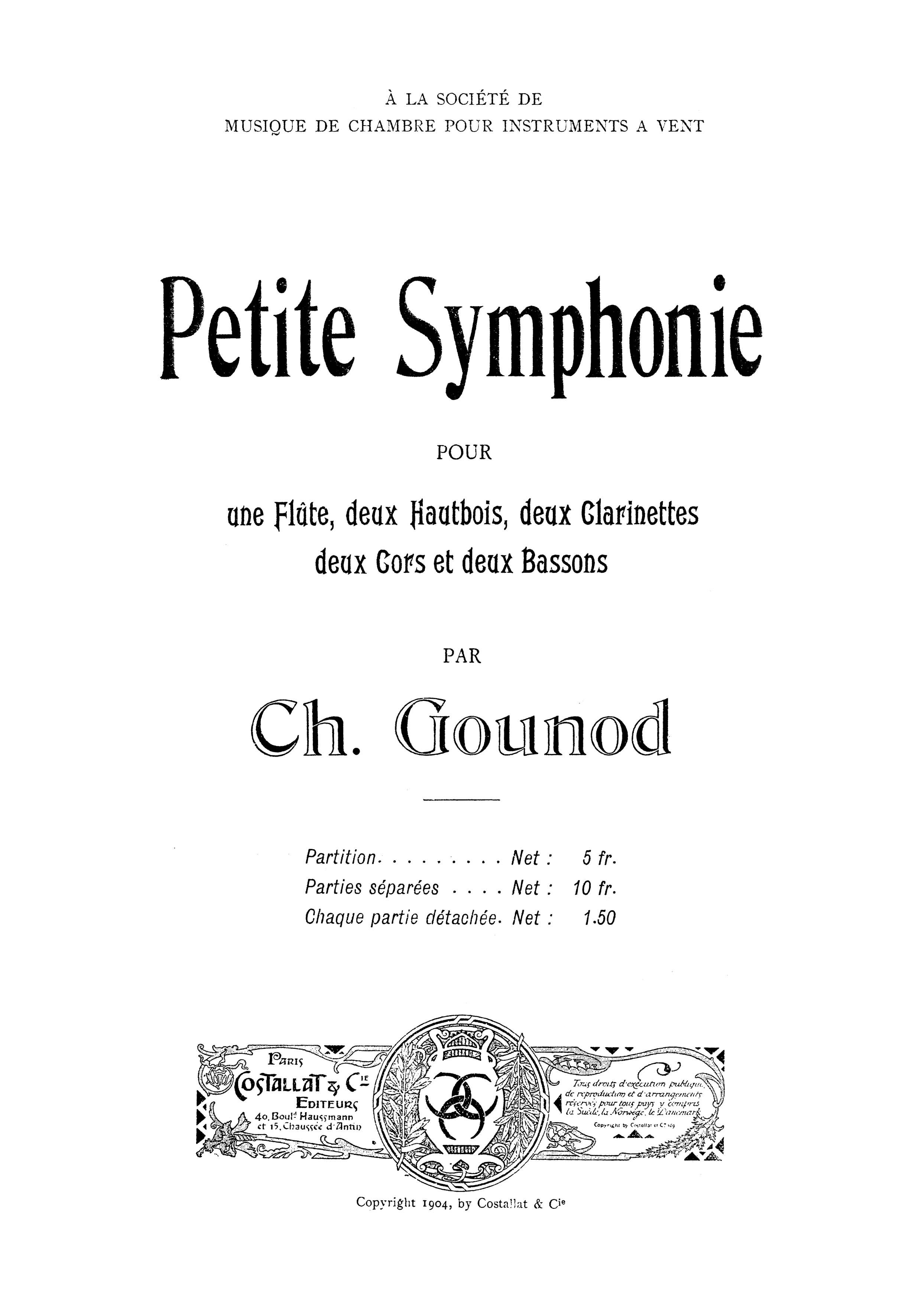
Cover of the first edition

I. Adagio, allegro

II. Andante cantabile

III. Scherzo (Allegro moderato)

IV. Finale (Allegretto)
Performed by the Soni Ventorum Wind Quintet

The Petite Symphonie in B♭ major is a four-movement work by Charles Gounod, first performed in 1885. It is scored for a wind ensemble of nine players.

Gounod had composed two symphonies for full orchestra in the 1850s but had since then generally concentrated on opera, songs, and religious music. At the request of a Parisian wind ensemble, the Société de musique de chambre pour instruments à vent, led by the flautist Paul Taffanel, he wrote a nonet for flute and pairs of oboes, clarinets, horns and bassoons.

The work was first given at the Salle Pleyel in Paris on 30 April 1885. The score was not published until 1904.

== Structure ==
The work, which plays for about twenty minutes, is in four movements:

1. Adagio – Allegro
2. Andante cantabile (quasi adagio) attacca
3. Scherzo. Allegro moderato
4. Finale. Allegretto
