= Nonet (music) =

Chamber music group of nine

Gounod's Petite Symphonie pour neuf instruments à vent (Little Symphony for Nine Wind Instruments)
1. Adagio, allegro

2. Andante cantabile

3. Scherzo (Allegro moderato)

4. Finale (Allegretto)
Performed by the Soni Ventorum Wind Quintet

In music, a nonet is a chamber music composition which requires nine musicians for a performance. The standard nonet scoring is for wind quintet, violin, viola, cello, and double bass, though other combinations are also found. Additionally, the term may apply to a group of nine musicians regardless of whether they are playing chamber music.

== Classical nonets ==
The first work to actually bear the title of nonet was Louis Spohr's Grand Nonetto in F major, Op. 31 (1813), for flute, oboe, clarinet, bassoon, French horn, violin, viola, cello, and double bass. Earlier compositions, however, had been composed for nine instruments (Joseph Haydn's four Divertimenti (or Cassations), for 2 oboes, 2 horns, 2 violins, 2 violas, and double bass, Hob. II:9, 17 [2 clarinets instead of oboes], 20, and G1, Ignaz Pleyel's Nocturne of 1785, for 2 clarinets, 2 horns, 2 violas, double bass, and 2 hurdy-gurdies, and Franz Schubert's Eine kleine Trauermusik of 1813 (D 79), for two clarinets, two bassoons, contrabassoon, two horns, and two trombones).

=== The Spohr ensemble as standard ===
Louis Spohr's nonet was so successful that its instrumentation became the standard for subsequent emulation down to the present time. The many composers who wrote for this combination include Louise Farrenc (Op. 38, 1849), Georges Onslow (Op. 77, 1851), Franz Lachner (Nonet in F major 1875), Josef Rheinberger (Op. 139, 1884), and Tilo Medek (Nonet in Nine Movements, 1974). Other works, though not actually titled "nonet", followed the same pattern, such as René Leibowitz's Chamber Concerto (Op. 10, 1944). In the 20th century this standard instrumentation was embodied especially by the Czech Nonet, for whom works were composed by Josef Bohuslav Foerster (Op. 147, 1931) and Alois Hába, whose first two nonets are titled Fantazie, opp. 40 and 41 (1931 and 1932), followed by Nonet No. 3, Op. 82, and Nonet No. 4, Op. 97. Bohuslav Martinů dedicated his 1959 Nonet to the Czech Nonet on the occasion of its 35th anniversary.

=== Subsequent non-standard ensembles ===
One late-19th-century, slightly non-standard example is Samuel Coleridge-Taylor's 1894 Nonet in F minor, for an ensemble in which a piano replaced the flute.

The non-standard instrumentations used by Hanns Eisler were different in each of his two nonets: his 1939 Nonet No. 1 is composed for flute, clarinet, bassoon, horn, two violins, viola, violoncello, and double bass, while his 1941 Nonet No. 2 is for flute, clarinet, bassoon, trumpet, percussion, three violins, and double bass.

Many nine-instrument works for other combinations than the standard Spohr ensemble have been composed since 1900, but often depart from chamber-music textures and mostly are given titles suggesting small orchestral forces. Examples include Darius Milhaud's chamber symphony Le printemps, Op. 43 (1917), Egon Kornauth's Kammermusik, Op. 31 (1924), Ernst Krenek's Sinfonische Musik for nine solo instruments, Op. 11 (1922), Bruno Stürmer's Suite, Op. 9 (1923), and Anton Webern's Symphony (1927–1928) and Concerto for Nine Instruments (1931–34). On the other hand, Heitor Villa-Lobos's Nonet, subtitled "Impressão rápida de todo o Brasil" (1923) exceeds the ensemble's nominal size by adding a mixed choir to the basic instrumentation of flute/piccolo, oboe, clarinet, alto or baritone saxophone, bassoon, celesta, harp, piano, and percussion—the latter requiring more than one player. Planos is a 1934 composition by Silvestre Revueltas for clarinet, bass clarinet, bassoon, trumpet, piano, 2 violins, cello, and double bass. The third of British composer Peter Seabourne's chamber concertos, Storyteller, is a miniature double bass concerto accompanied by an octet of wind quintet and piano trio.

Iannis Xenakis composed many chamber-music works for comparatively large numbers of instruments. Among them are the nonets Akanthos, for soprano, flute, clarinet, piano, 2 violins, viola, cello and double bass (1977), Kaï, for flute, clarinet, bassoon, trumpet, trombone, violin, viola, cello, and double bass (1995), and Kuïlenn, for the classical 18th-century serenade scoring favoured by the Netherlands Wind Ensemble, for whom it was written: flute, 2 oboes, 2 clarinets, 2 bassoons, and 2 horns (1995).

Brian Ferneyhough's Terrain (1992), is scored for nine instruments, but is for solo violin accompanied by an octet consisting of flute (+ piccolo), oboe (+ cor anglais), clarinet (+ bass clarinet), bassoon, horn, trumpet, trombone, and double bass.

=== String nonets ===
String-only nonets have also been composed, notably by Nicolai von Wilm (Nonet Op. 150, 1911, 4 violins, 2 violas, 2 cellos, and double bass) and Aaron Copland (1960, 3 violins, 3 violas, 3 cellos).

Iannis Xenakis's Analogique A (1958) is also a string nonet, but must be performed with a companion tape work, Analogique B.

=== Wind nonets ===
Nonets for ensembles constituted exclusively of wind instruments have also been composed, for example:

- For flute, 2 oboes, 2 clarinets, 2 bassoons, 2 horns by:
  - Werner J. E. De Bleser: Mouvements pour Orchestre à Vent
  - Théodore Gouvy: Petite Suite Gauloise, Op. 90
  - Charles Gounod: Petite symphonie
  - Gaetano Donizetti: Sinfonia for Winds in G minor, A 509
- For flute, oboe, cor anglais, 2 clarinets, 2 horns and 2 bassoons:
  - Hubert Parry: Wind Nonet
- For 2 oboes, 2 clarinets, 2 bassoons, 2 horns, trumpet:
  - Franz Schubert: 6 Minuets for Winds, D.2d, and Trio of a Minuet, D.2f
  - Josef Triebensee: Miscellanées de Musique, volume 3, Opp. 4-6
- For 2 oboes, 2 clarinets, 2 bassoons, contrabassoon, 2 horns:
  - Franz Krommer Five pieces titled 'Harmonie' and a 'Partita'

=== Jazz nonets ===
Miles Davis created a nine-piece jazz ensemble that recorded The Birth of the Cool, a later compilation 1949–1950 recordings that became foundational for cool jazz. The arrangements of mainly original compositions were scored for trumpet, trombone, French horn, tuba, alto saxophone, baritone saxophone, piano, bass and drums. The alto saxophonist on those sessions, Lee Konitz, released a pair of nonet LP records with slightly different instrumentation, including Lee Konitz Nonet, some thirty years later.
