= Little Symphony No. 6 (Milhaud) =

1923 composition by Darius Milhaud

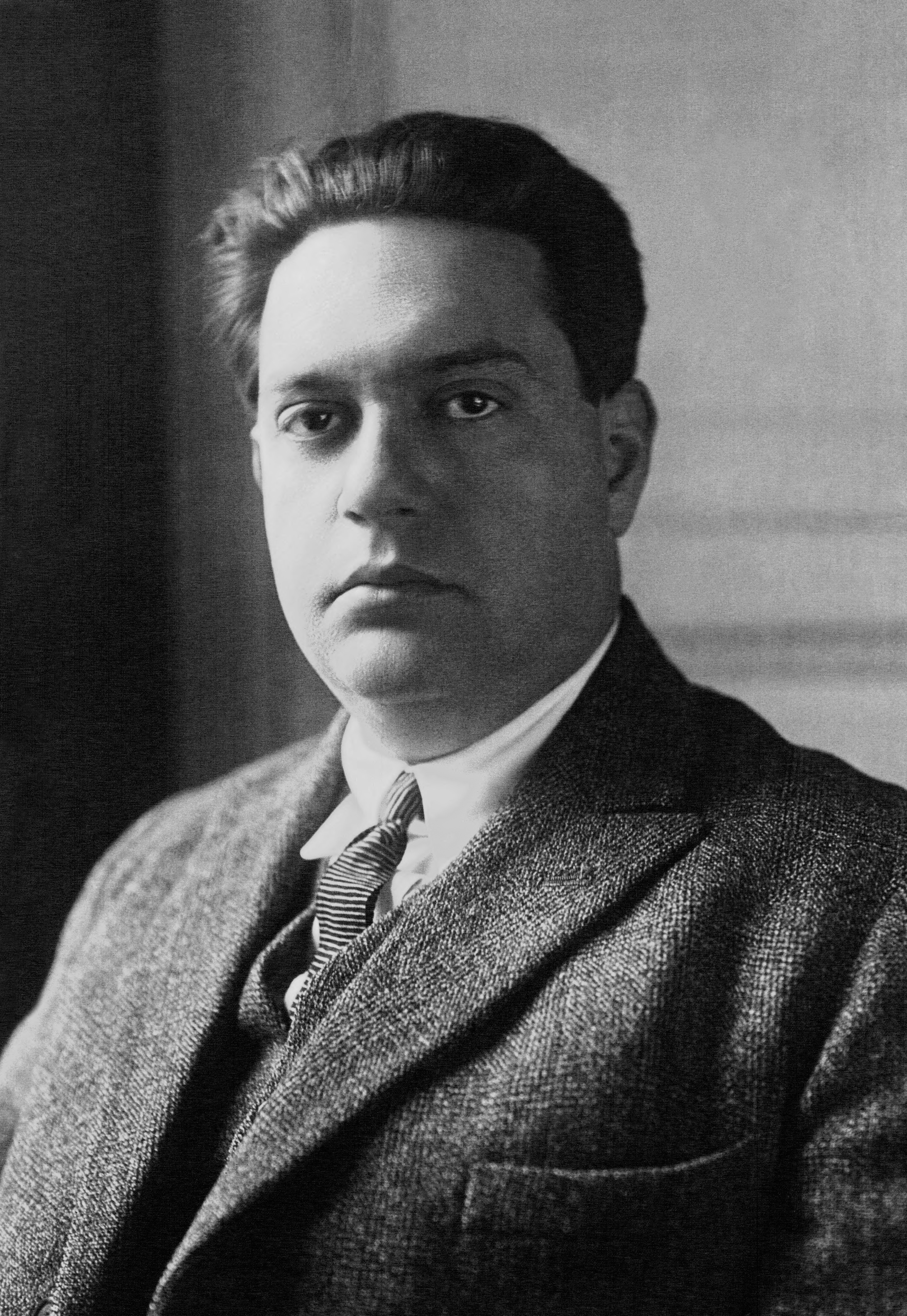
Darius Milhaud in 1923

Little Symphony No. 6, Op. 79, composed by Darius Milhaud in 1923, is a chamber music composition for oboe, cello, and wordless SATB vocal quartet. It premiered at a Concert Wiener at the Salle des Agriculteurs in Paris on 13 November 1923.

== Background ==
Milhaud visited the United States in 1922, and composed this piece in 1923 while in New York City. While there, he heard live jazz and its influence is evident in this piece and his following works, including the 1923 ballet, La création du monde. Little Symphony No. 6 was published in 1929 by Universal, separate from the previous five, which were published by Universal in 1922 and were reprinted by Dover in 2001. It is also the only piece out of the six with no subtitle attached.

== Music ==
Little Symphony No. 6 runs for about six to seven minutes and has a polytonal blues sound. Polytonality is something Milhaud is well known for. This piece has some added dissonance because of the voices even though the instruments chosen are the two closest to the sound of the human voice.

The symphony also strays from the typical fast–slow–fast movement structure and does the exact opposite with a slow–fast–slow order of movements. Milhaud goes from a flowing movement, to jaunty, to lyrical in this piece. The wordless voices distinguish this work from the previous five symphonies. Milhaud replicated this in his ballet L'Homme et son désir, which he composed in 1917 in Brazil.

=== I. Calme et doux ===
The first movement at about three minutes in duration has an A–B–A form and a flowing homophonic vocal line counterpoint to the instruments. It begins with an oboe solo as the voices enter on a pattern of thirds which comes back later on in the movement. In the B-section, the voices are polyphonic and the cello plays the thirds pattern as heard before and the movement ends with a recapitulation of some of the A-section.

=== II. Souple et vif ===
The form of this section, which lasts a little less than two minutes, is much less clear in this jaunty, faster movement. The voices are polyphonic and there are many jazz references throughout. It is often difficult to decipher the difference between the bass voice and the cello. The voices are heard in a call and response manner between the males and female voices towards the middle of the movement and it then continues with the vocal polyphony through the end of the movement.

=== III. Lent et très expressif ===
The form of this movement, about 2 1/2 minutes, is also much less obvious than the first movement. It has a lyrical sound with the oboe playing a recurring jazzy descending ostinato. The voices are again in polyphony for this movement.

== Recordings ==
A 1994 recording on the Vox label features the Orchestra of Radio Luxembourg conducted by Darius Milhaud himself.
