= Little Symphony No. 4 (Milhaud) =

Musical work composed by Darius Milhaud

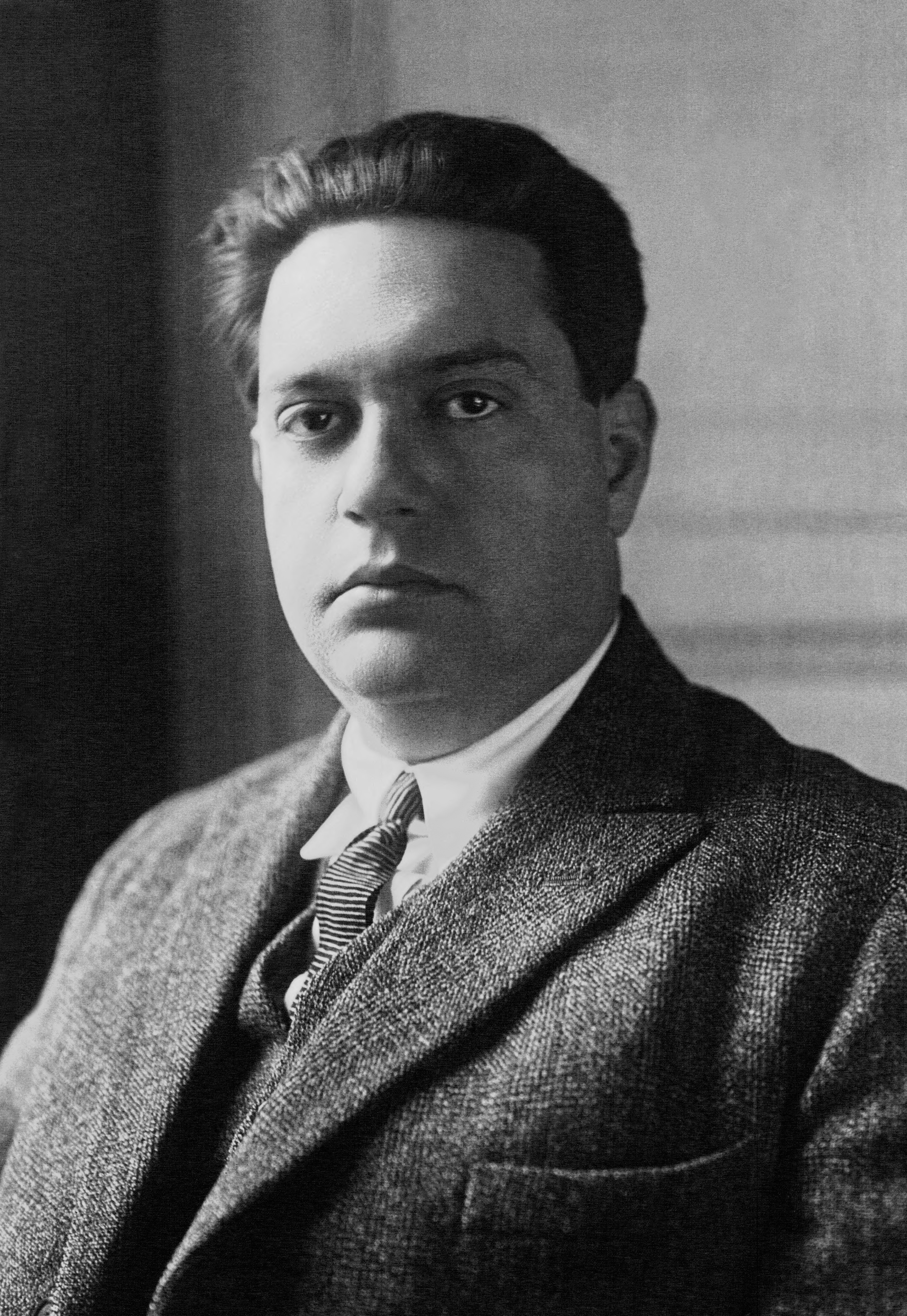
Darius Milhaud in 1923

Little (Chamber) Symphony No. 4: (Dixtuor pour instruments à cordes), Op.74, by Darius Milhaud is a work for 10 string instruments composed in Vienna in 1921. It is scored for four violins, two violas, two cellos, and two double basses. The music is polytonal and progresses through a variety of contrasting moods. It is not to be confused with Milhaud's Symphony No. 4.

Milhaud’s Fourth Little Symphony is approximately 6 minutes in duration and contains the following movements:

1. Ouverture (approx. 0’45’’)
2. Choral (approx. 3’25’’)
3. Etude (approx. 1’50’’)

The first two movements employ ostinatos to repeat basic musical ideas. The first movement is marked "Animé". It is a lively dance in triple meter and stylistically refers back to the baroque period. The second movement is marked "Assez lent" and features multiple double bass solos. The final movement incorporates imitative polyphony in a fugal section.

This little symphony was originally published by Dover Publications in 1922.

== Reception ==
Little Symphony No. 4 has received mixed reviews since its inception. G.W. Hopkins pointed out the "irritating antics" of this little symphony in his 1970 review in The Musical Times. Christopher Headington of the classical music review website Gramophone referred to the etude movement as "comic."

== Recordings ==
- A 1975 recording on vinyl on the ABC Westminster Gold label, featuring The Chamber Orchestra of The Leningrad Philharmonic conducted by Gennady Rozhdestvenski
- A 1994 CD recording on the Koch Schwann label, featuring Capella Cracoviensis and Karl Anton Rickenbacher
- A 1969 recording on vinyl on the Candide label, featuring the Orchestra of Radio Luxemburg
