= Little Symphony No. 5 (Milhaud) =

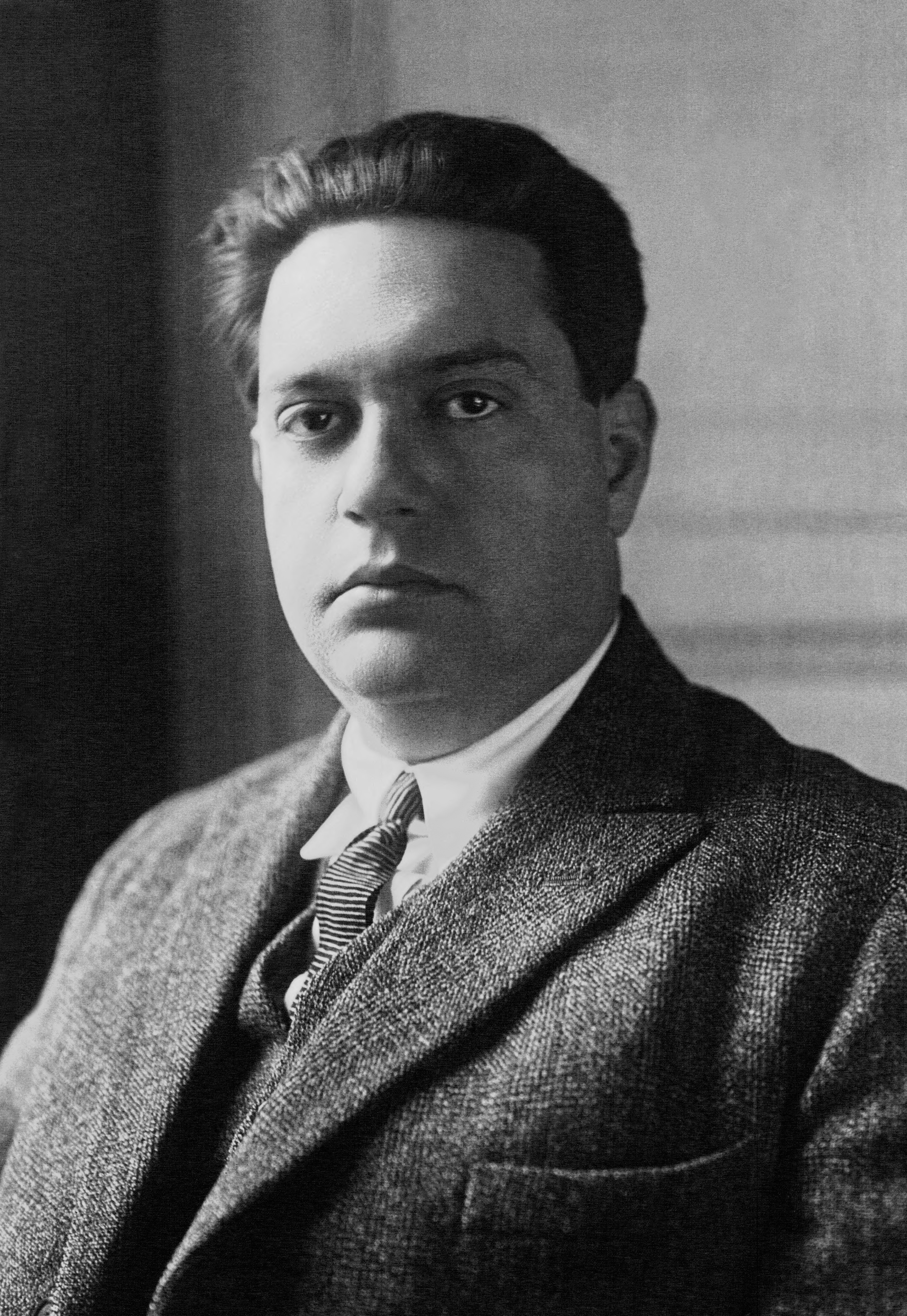
Darius Milhaud in 1923

The Little (Chamber) Symphony No. 5, Op.75, also known as the Tentet, is a symphony for wind instruments written by French composer Darius Milhaud in 1922. It is his fifth chamber symphony, which is also referred to as the Petites Symphonies or Chamber Symphonies.

The work was commissioned by Italian Radio and is dedicated to Marya Freúnd, a soprano singer and Milhaud's friend, who performed the premiere of Schoenberg's Pierrot Lunaire, conducted by Milhaud. The symphony was first performed at Champs-Elysées, Paris in 1923.

== Music ==
Chamber Symphony No. 5 is written for an ensemble of ten wind instruments, consisting of a piccolo, flute, oboe, English horn, B♭ clarinet, bass clarinet, two bassoons and two horns.

It consists of three movements with a collective run time of about six minutes:

1. Rude (1'15")
2. Lent (3'30")
3. Violent (2'10")

All three movements use a motivic cell construction, scalar chromatic motion, and predominantly contrary motion between voices. The form of the piece is more ambiguous, however, since the symphony was written after Milhaud's excursion to Brazil. It displays elements of baroque musical forms popular in the neo-baroque revitalization that characterized Milhaud's time. Mawer notes some characteristics common to Milhaud's compositions in his early years that can be applied to the Chamber Symphonies. They include: "chromaticism bordering on atonality, a distinctive jazz-inspired modality, and a surprising aleatoric element, bound together by neoclassical aesthetic."

=== I. Rude ===
This movement starts with a motif beginning on G with alternating minor seconds and octaves in the oboe; simultaneously, an inversion of this motif starting on E♯ is played by the English horn. A similar motif is played between the bassoons, with alternating minor seconds and major seventh intervals instead. This motif is repeated several times throughout the movement, occasionally in fragments and by different instruments. This movement may have been composed in ternary form.

=== II. Lent ===
This movement features similar motivic cell construction, but it alternates instead between major thirds, minor thirds and major seconds. After their initial appearance, the cells reappear on different instruments. This creates a checkerboard pattern. This movement makes frequent use of trills, especially in the first flute, which frequently trills on B♭, sometimes moving to C and C♯ an octave higher. This movement also makes use of chromatic scalar motion.

=== III. Violent ===
The motivic cell of this movement centers on a stepwise descent from D to A, which then jumps back up to D in an alternating double-dotted sixteenth, followed by a thirty-second note pattern. This motive first appears in the clarinets, but is also repeated in the flute and oboe. This movement also features alternating figures, such as the alternating minor second motif in the oboe, an alternating major third in the second bassoon and a repeating eighth note figure on D in the first bassoon. Both bassoon parts lead into chromatic scalar motion.

== Recordings ==
- A recording on the Brilliant Classics label featuring the Luxembourg Radio Orchestra conducted by Milhaud

== Sources ==
1. Mawer, Deborah (2008-12-01). "Positioning Milhaud's Late Chamber Music: Compositional 'Full Circle'?". The Musical Times. 149 (1905): 45–60. doi:10.2307/25434571. JSTOR 25434571.
