= Little Symphony No. 1 (Milhaud) =

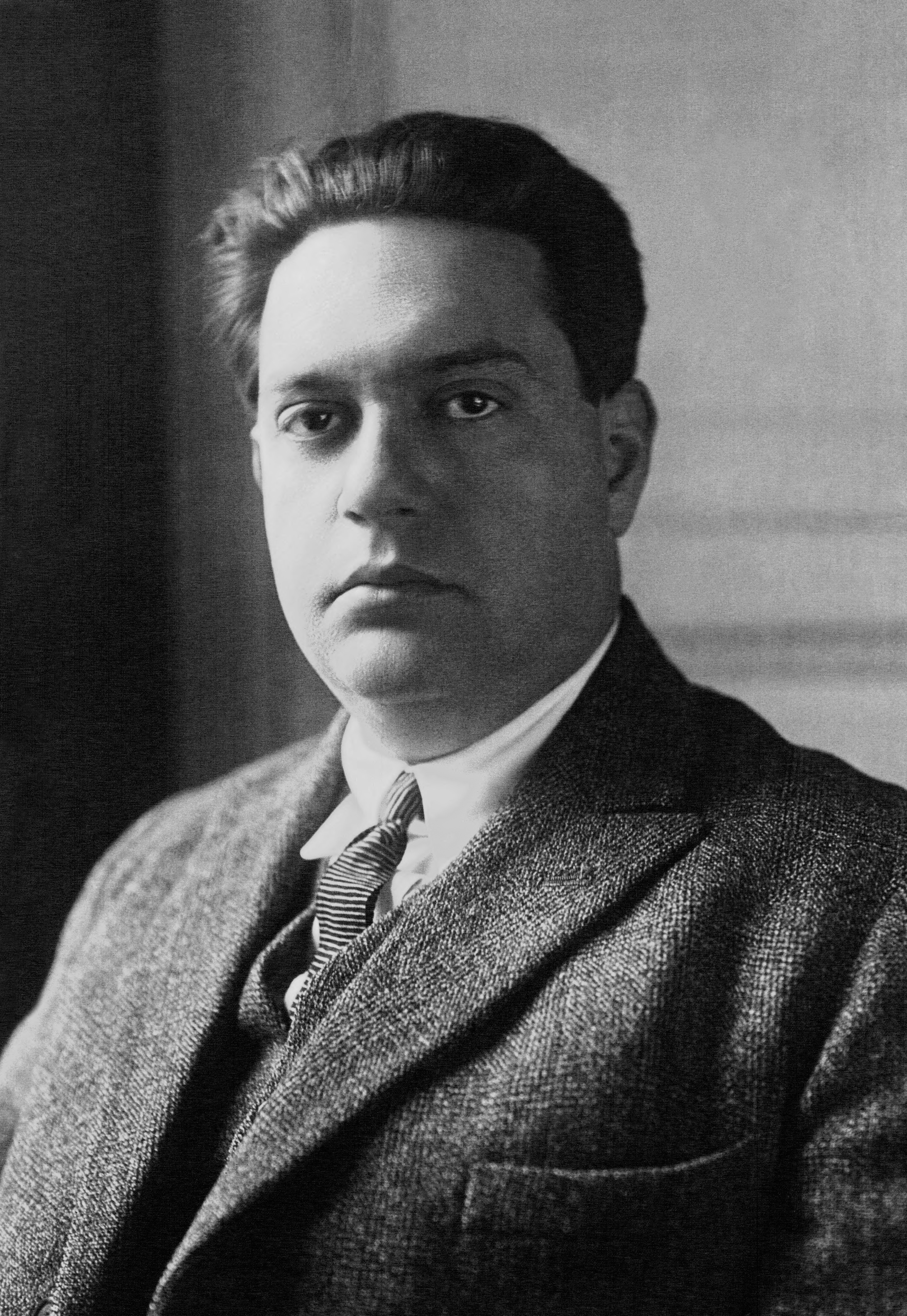
Darius Milhaud in 1923

Little (Chamber) Symphony No. 1 “Le Printemps” Op. 43, the first of a collection of six "Little Symphonies" by Darius Milhaud, is a symphony by name only, due to its length of just over 3 minutes. This piece should not be confused with Milhaud's Symphony No. 1.

It was composed in Rio de Janeiro in 1917. It premiered there in 1918, and was published by Universal in 1922. The influence of Brazilian culture, jazz, and polytonality is very clearly seen in this series of symphonies. According to Milhaud himself, he was quite attracted to the unusual quality of small groups of instruments, which is why he embarked on his series of Petites Symphonies. His stay in Brazil, acting as assistant to the diplomat/poet Paul Claudel, influenced this work.

This First Little Symphony was written for piccolo, flute, clarinet, oboe, harp, 2 violins, viola, and cello. Overall, it has a very simple melody, contains polytonal elements, and possesses a pastoral, folkish feeling throughout. The melodies and pitches evoke a light, airy feeling, such as that of the spring, thus alluding to the symphony's subtitle.

== Movements ==
The work has three movements:

1. Allant
2. Chantant
3. Et vif!

=== I. Allant ===
The first movement begins at a relaxed tempo and is slightly less upbeat and allegro than other first movements to symphonies, such as Milhaud's Symphony No.1. The basic analysis of this symphony is based on a recording by the Orchestra of Radio Luxembourg.

The first movement has a very flowy, pastoral texture, with the harp playing a significant role. The harp could be compared to a trickling stream during the springtime, due to the numerous, continuous, thirty-second notes that at times were arpeggiated for the entirety of the movement. With the harp, the woodwinds take control of the melody, whereas the strings involved do not play a significant role in this particular movement, as they only play basic quarter-note and half-note rhythms throughout. The cello has some pizzicato sections which adds to the texture of the piece.

=== II. Chantant ===
The tempo is noticeably slower for the second movement and the oboe takes control of the melody here. The strings also begin to creep in as the movement progresses and the overall dynamic is piano, with the oboe solo rising just above the rest of the orchestra. Milhaud wrote in the score that the strings should be muted, adding flavor to the overall mood and texture of the piece.

=== III. Et vif! ===
In the final movement, the tempo is a lively, jaunty allegro, and there are certain elements such as the harmonies that appear to be related to the first movement. The clarinet plays the largest role in this movement, since the clarinet plays the main melody throughout and doesn't trade it off to any other instrument. The only other instruments that get a slight taste of a melodic line are the piccolo and flute at the very end of the piece for a mere four measures. The strings and other woodwinds add to the overall texture with their "filler notes," such as the pizzicato and half and quarter notes being played in the strings, along with the harp and its steady sixteenth note arpeggios. The very end to this piece is almost abrupt, as the dynamic falls, the tempo slows, and there is a slight retard where the woodwinds quietly end the movement and entire symphony on a very light note indeed.

== Recordings ==
- Orchestra of Radio Luxembourg, conducted by Darius Milhaud
- L’Ensemble des Temps Modernes, conducted by Bernard Dekaise, recorded 2–4 March 1992 in Royal Conservatory of Liège
- Villa Musica Ensemble, on Gramophone
