= Dumont (surname) =

Dumont is a French surname. Notable people with the surname include:

- Adèle Dumont d'Urville (1798–1842), wife of Jules Dumont d'Urville, who named Adélie Land after her
- Allen B. DuMont (1901–1965), American inventor, industrialist, and pioneer in the early years of television
- André Dumont (geologist) (1809–1857), Belgian geologist
- André Dumont (cyclist) (1903–1994), French racing cyclist
- André Dumont (politician) (1764–1838), French parliamentarian
- Annick Dumont (born 1962), French figure skating coach
- Augustin-Alexandre Dumont, known as Auguste Dumont (1801–1884), French sculptor
- Bernard Dumont (1927–1974), Canadian politician
- Bernard Dumont (fencer) (born 1946), French fencer
- Bruce DuMont (1944–2025), American broadcaster and political analyst
- Bruno Dumont (born 1958), French motion picture director (of polemic La Vie de Jésus fame)
- Casey Dumont (born 1992), Australian international soccer player
- Charles Dumont (politician) (1867–1939), French politician
- Charles Dumont (singer) (1929–2024), French singer and composer
- Charles Dumont de Sainte-Croix (1758–1830), French zoologist
- Christian Dumont (1963–2021), French biathlete
- Christian Dumont (cyclist) (born 1956), Belgian cyclist
- Dawn Dumont, Canadian Cree writer
- Delree Dumont (fl. early 21st century), Canadian Cree artist
- Denise Dumont (born 1955), Brazilian actress
- Dillon Dumont, American politician
- Domenique Dumont (fl. early 21st century), Latvian music producer
- Duke Dumont, stage name of Adam George Dyment (fl. early 21st century), British DJ
- Ebenezer Dumont (1814–1871), U.S. Representative from Indiana; general in the Union Army during the American Civil War
- Edith Dumont (born 1964), Lieutenant Governor of Ontario
- Edme Dumont (1720–1775), French sculptor
- Edward C. DuMont (born 1961), American attorney, a former Solicitor General of California
- Eleanor Dumont (1829–1879), American gambler during the California Gold Rush
- Emma Dumont (born 1994), American actress, model, and dancer
- Éric Dumont (sailor) (born 1961), French yachtsman
- Éric Dumont-Baltet (fl. early 21st century), French horticulturalist and nursery gardener
- Étienne Dumont (1759–1829), Swiss French political writer
- Fernand Dumont (1927–1997), Canadian sociologist, poet and writer
- François Dumont (painter) (1751–1831), French painter of portrait miniatures
- François Dumont (pianist) (born 1985), French classical pianist
- François Dumont (sculptor) (1688–1729), French sculptor
- Frank Dumont (1848–1919), American minstrel show performer and manager
- Franz Dumont (1945–2012), German historian
- Gabriel Dumont (ice hockey) (born 1990), Canadian ice hockey player
- Gabriel Dumont (Métis leader) (1837–1906), Canadian indigenous leader of the Métis people
- Gaston Dumont (1932–1978), Luxembourgish cyclist
- George Dumont (1895–1956), American baseball pitcher
- Georges Dumont (1898–1966), Canadian physician and political figure
- Guillaume Dumont (1889–?), Belgian sculptor
- Guillaume Coutu Dumont (fl. early 21st century), Canadian electronic musician
- Guylaine Dumont (born 1967), Canadian beach volleyball player
- Henri Dumont (1610–1684), French musician and composer
- Henrique Dumont (1832–1892), Brazilian engineer and coffee farmer
- Hyacinthe de Gauréault Dumont, (1647–1726) French administrator
- Ivy Dumont (born 1930), governor-general of the Bahamas
- Jacques-Edme Dumont (1761–1844), French sculptor
- Jean Dumont (cyclist) (born 1943), French road bicycle racer
- Jean Dumont (historian) (1923–2001), French historian and publisher
- Jean Dumont (politician) (1930–2021), French politician
- Jean Dumont (publicist) (1667–1727), French writer and historian
- Jean Dumont (wrestler) (1886–?), Belgian Greco-Roman wrestler
- Jean-Louis Dumont (born 1944), French politician
- Jean-Pierre Dumont (born 1978), Canadian professional ice hockey forward
- José Dumont (born 1950), Brazilian TV and movie actor
- Joseph Dumont (1847–1912), Canadian merchant and political figure
- Jules Dumont d'Urville (1790–1842), French naval officer and explorer
- Julia Louisa Dumont (1794–1857), American educator and writer
- Julius du Mont (1881–1956), French chess writer
- Laurence Dumont (born 1958), French politician
- Léon Dumont (1837–1877), French psychologist and philosopher
- Lionel Dumont (born 1971), French former soldier and imprisoned terrorist
- Louis Dumont (1911–1998), French anthropologist
- Louis Dumont (ice hockey) (born 1973), Canadian ice hockey player
- Louise Dumont (1862–1932), German actress and theater director
- Lucille Dumont (1919–2016), Canadian singer and radio and television host
- Marcel Dumont (1885–1951), French film director
- Margaret Dumont (1882–1965), American actress
- Marie-Alice Dumont (1892–1985), Canadian photographer
- Marilyn Dumont (born 1955), Canadian poet and educator
- Mario Dumont (born 1970), Canadian politician from Québec
- Mary Dumont (fl. early 21st century), American chef
- Michel Dumont (1941–2020), Canadian actor
- Micheline Dumont (historian) (born 1935), Canadian historian, lecturer, professor
- Mike Dumont (fl. late 20th/early 21st centuries), U.S. Navy officer
- Nancy Dumont (1936–2002), Native American educational leader
- Nicolas Dumont (disambiguation), several people
- Norbert Dumont (fl. early 20th century), Luxembourgish politician and jurist
- Palmire Dumont (1855–1915), French manager and owner of lesbian and gay bars
- Patrick Dumont, American businessman
- Paul Dumont (1920–2008), Canadian ice hockey administrator
- Pierre Dumont (painter) (1884–1936), French painter
- Pierre Dumont (sculptor) (c. 1650–?), French sculptor
- Pierre François Dumont (1789–1864), French industrialist
- Pierre-Henri Dumont (born 1987), French politician
- René Dumont (1904–2001), French agronomist, sociologist and scientist
- Richard M. Dumont (born 1959), Canadian voice actor, writer, and director
- Robert Dumont (bobsleigh) (fl. 1940s), French bobsledder
- Sabine Dumont, suspected French victim of serial killer Robert Black
- Sarah Dumont (born 1990), American actress and model
- Serge Dumont (born 1960), French businessperson
- Simon Dumont (born 1986), American freestyle skier
- Sky du Mont (born 1947), German actor
- Stéphane Dumont (born 1982), French footballer
- Stéphanie Dumont (born 1968), French speed skater
- Tom Dumont (born 1968), American musician, lead guitarist of No Doubt
- Trent Dumont (born 1995), Australian rules footballer
- Ulises Dumont (1937–2008), Argentine film actor
- Valentine Dumont (born 2000), Belgian swimmer
- W. Hunt Dumont (born 1941), American lawyer and judge
- Wayne Dumont (1914–1992), American politician from New Jersey
- Yvon Dumont (born 1951), former Lieutenant-Governor of the Province of Manitoba, Canada (1993–1999)

== See also ==
- Alberto Santos-Dumont (1873–1932), Brazilian aviation pioneer and inventor
- Éric Dumont-Baltet, French horticulturalist
- Dumon, people with the surname Dumon

== In fiction ==
- Jethro Dumont, pulp magazine character as The Green Lama
- Giles Dumont, boy who turns into a 'werefox' in The Werefox
