= Farrenc (surname) =

Farrenc is a surname. Notable people with the surname include:

- Aristide Farrenc (1794–1865), French flautist
- Louise Farrenc (1804–1875), French composer, pianist, and teacher
- Victorine Farrenc (1826–1859) French pianist and composer, daughter of Louise and Aristide
