= Jacques Dumont le Romain =

French artist (1701–1781)

Jacques Dumont
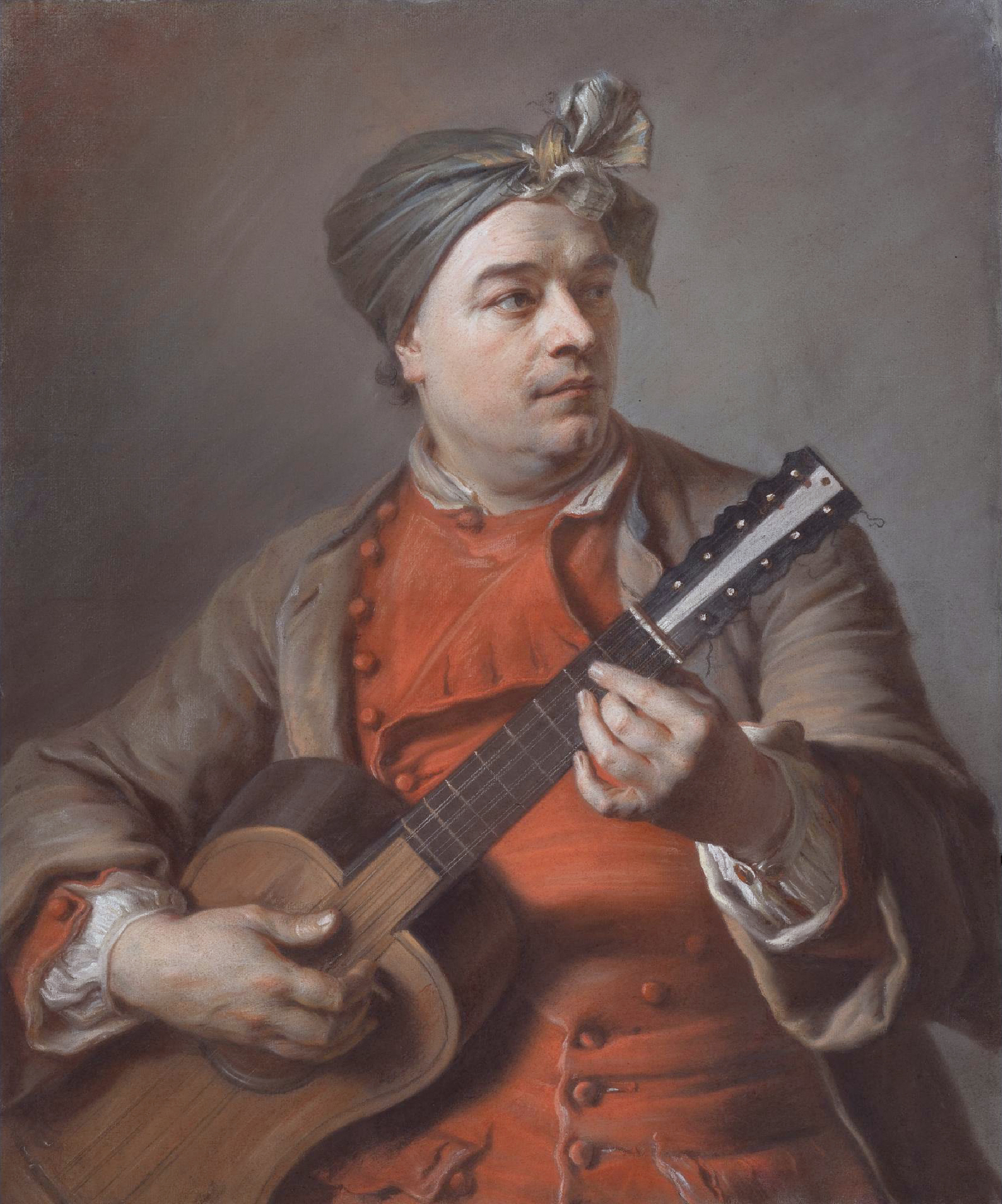
- Portrait of Dumont by Académie member Maurice-Quentin de La Tour
- Born: 10 May 1704; Paris, Kingdom of France
- Died: 17 February 1781 (aged 76); Paris, Kingdom of France
- Other name: Le Romain
- Education: Antoine Lebel
- Parents: Pierre Dumont (father); Marie Mercier (mother)
- Relatives: François Dumont (brother), Edme Dumont (nephew)

Director of the Académie Royale de Peinture et de Sculpture
- In office 1763–1763
- Monarch: Louis XV
- Preceded by: Jean Restout
- Succeeded by: Charles-André van Loo

Jacques Dumont called "le Romain" (10 May 1704 — 17 February 1781), was a French artist, who worked in painting, engraving and drawing. He was called "the Roman" from his youthful residence at Rome and to distinguish him from other artists named Dumont, notably his fellow-academician Jean-Joseph Dumont. Though comparatively unknown today, he enjoyed celebrity and a long, successful career.

== Biography ==
Dumont was born in Paris on 10 May 1704. He was the second son of Pierre Dumont, court sculptor to Leopold, Duke of Lorraine, and Marie Mercier. François Dumont, Dumont's older brother, also sculpted for the Duke of Lorraine until his untimely death in 1726.

Pierre-Jean Mariette, who knew him well, reported that in his youth le Romain made his way to Rome by camping out; Mariette makes errors about his teacher in Rome, however. Dumont returned to Paris in 1725.

In 1727, he first showed at the Paris Salon and in 1728 he was received as a member of the Académie Royale de Peinture et de Sculpture, with a Hercule et Omphale as his morceau de reception. At meetings he terrorized his fellow-academicians with his acerbic and caustic wit. When the engraver Le Bas was refused by the academicians, he remarked, "Stick a chalk-holder up his ass and he'll still draw better than you." (Note: "f-- -lui un porte-crayon au c-- et il dessinera encore mieux que vous.")

In addition to his paintings he practiced etching, in which medium he reproduced some of his paintings and, for example, Servandoni's view of the fireworks celebrating the marriage of the dauphin, 1730.

In 1731 he was appointed painter to the tapestry manufacture at Aubusson and served in that capacity until 1755, forming a school of designers there that raised standards of quality. His contract required six cartoons and three designs for pile carpets annually. Aubusson's rivals at the royal manufacture of the Gobelins gave him a back-handed compliment in a memoire to the royal administration dated 10 March 1754, and signed by Audran, Cozette and Neilson: "to prevent the decadence of the Gobelin Factory, it would be necessary to attach to it Sr. Boucher," giving him the assistance of other painters of the Académie such as "Sieurs Dumont Le Romain, Jeaurat, Halle, Challe, Vien."

Dumont was briefly Director of the Académie in 1763. When the official paintings school, the École royale des élèves protegés opened in January 1749, Dumont was appointed governor, but withdrew after three months, citing insufficient funds supporting the new institution.

Dumont died on 17 February 1781 in Paris.

== Gallery ==
=== Paintings ===
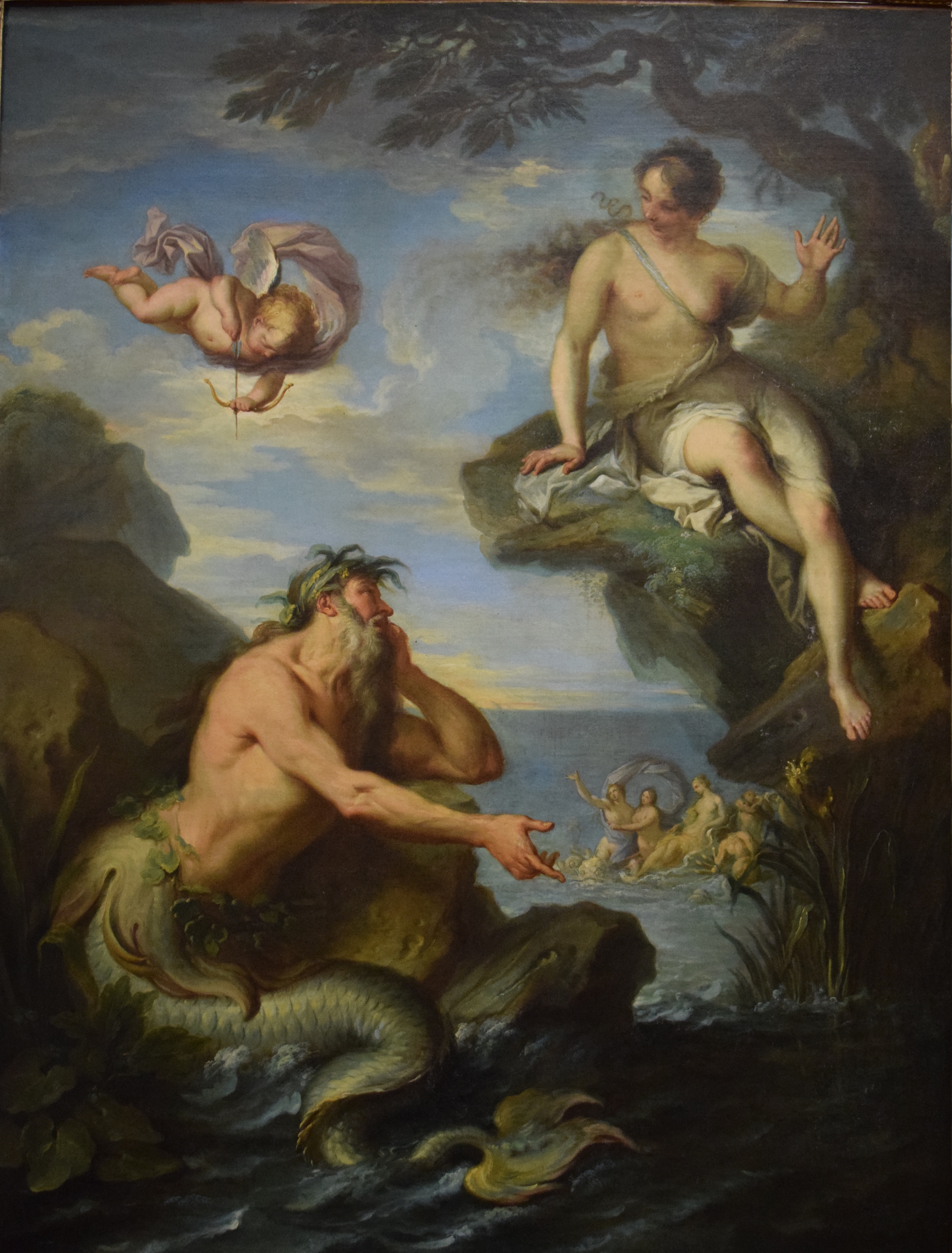
Glaucus and Scylla (1726)

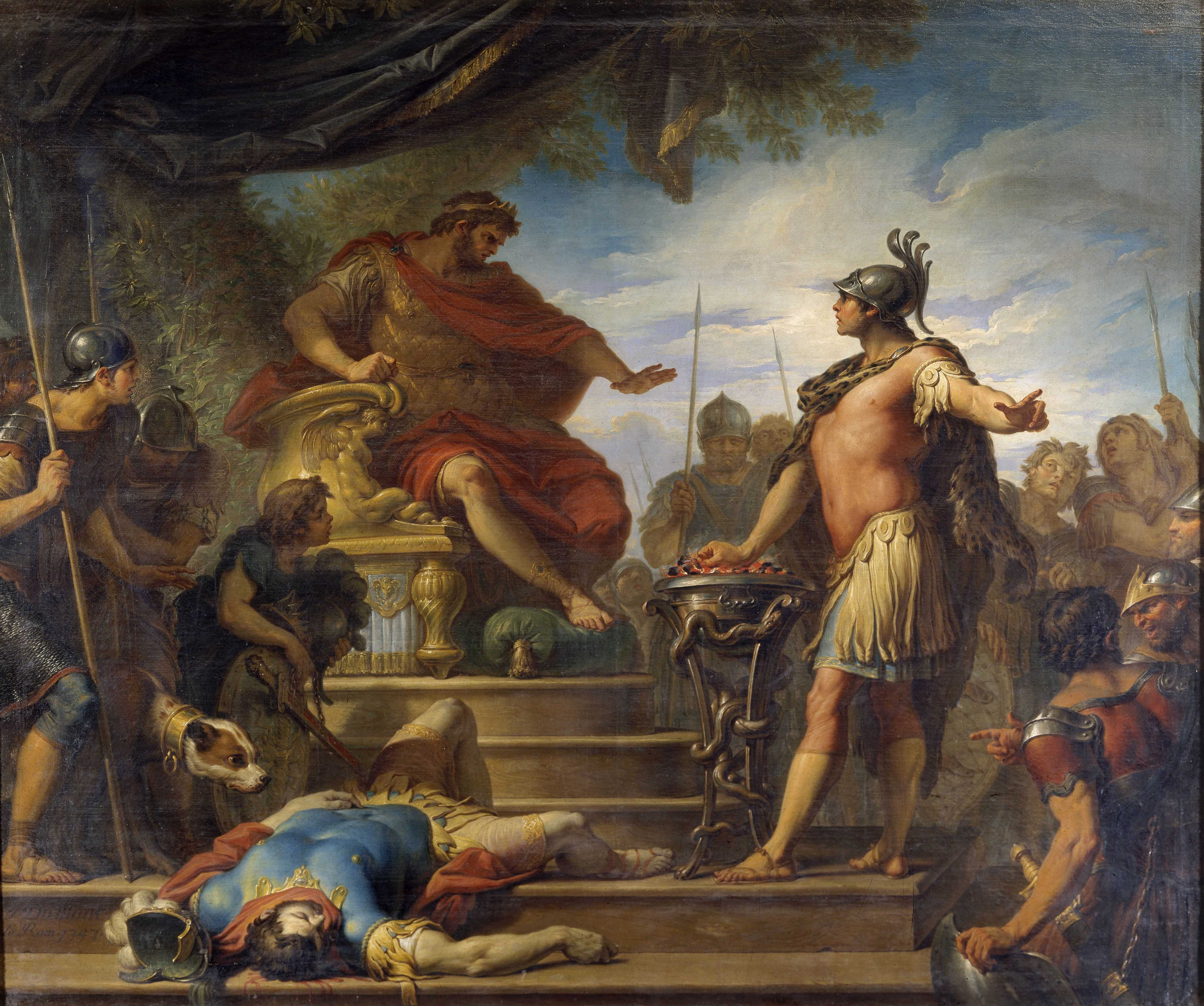
Mucius Scaevola (1747)

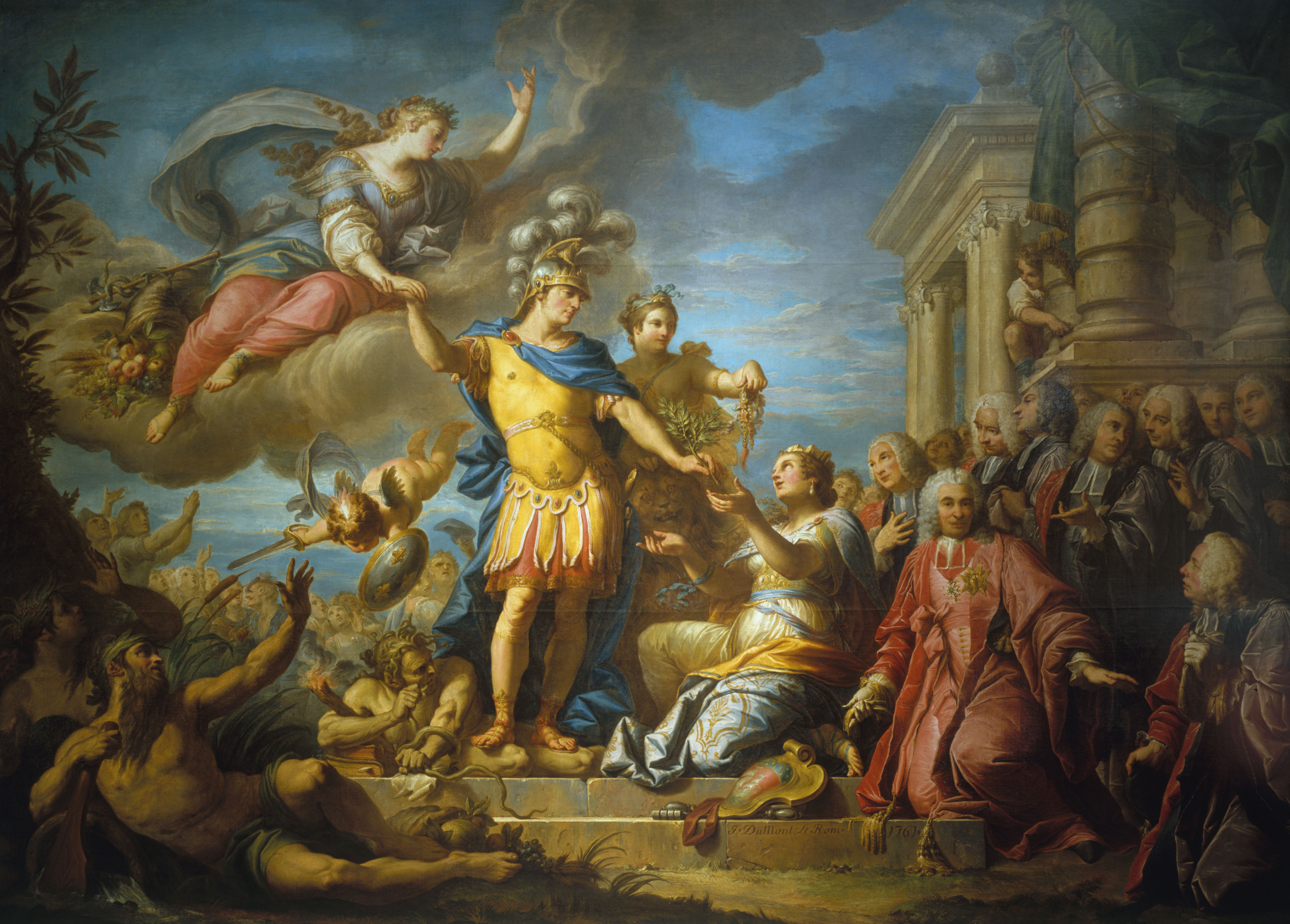
Allegory of the Peace of Aix-la-Chapelle (1761)

=== Drawings ===
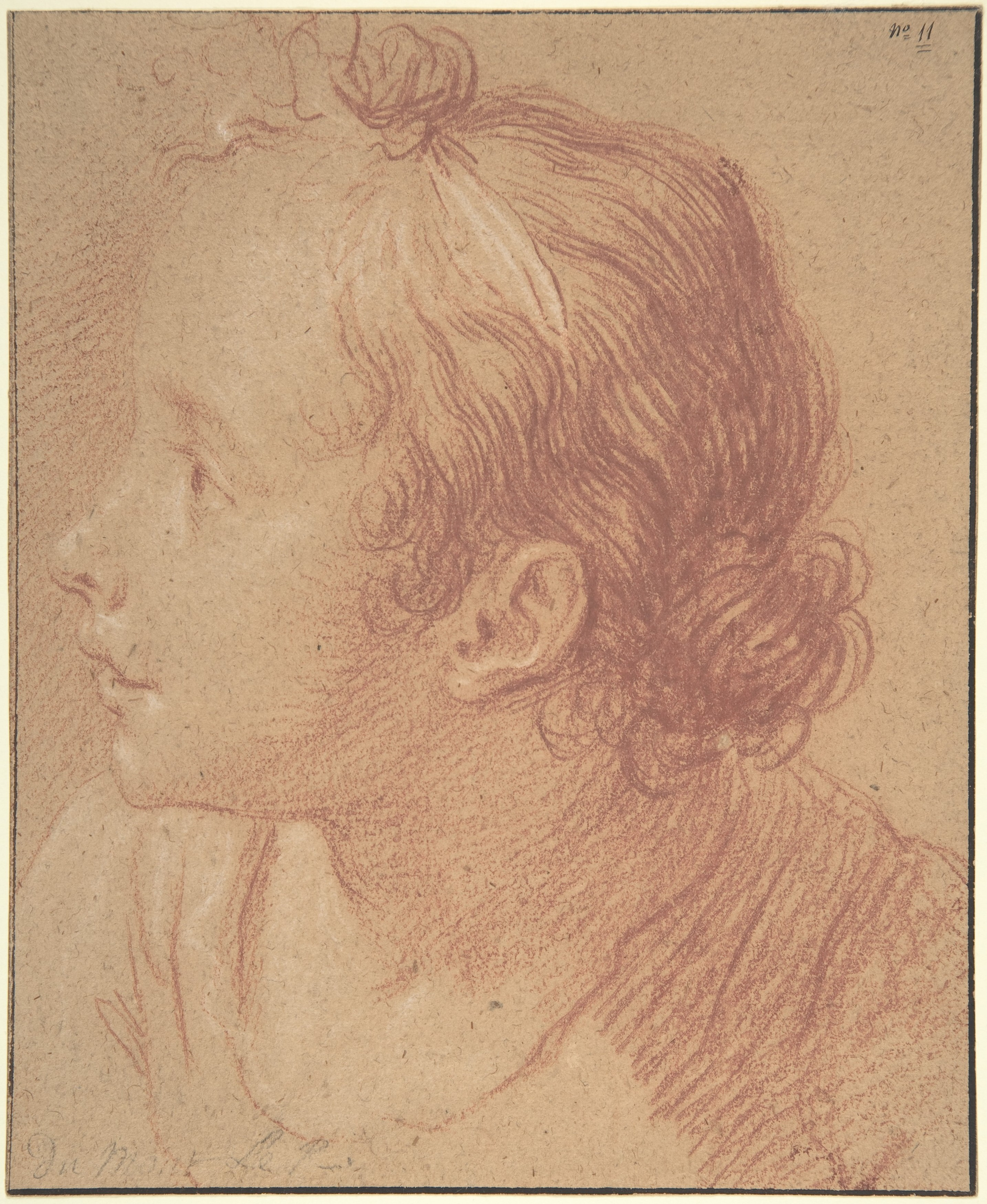
Head of a Young Girl

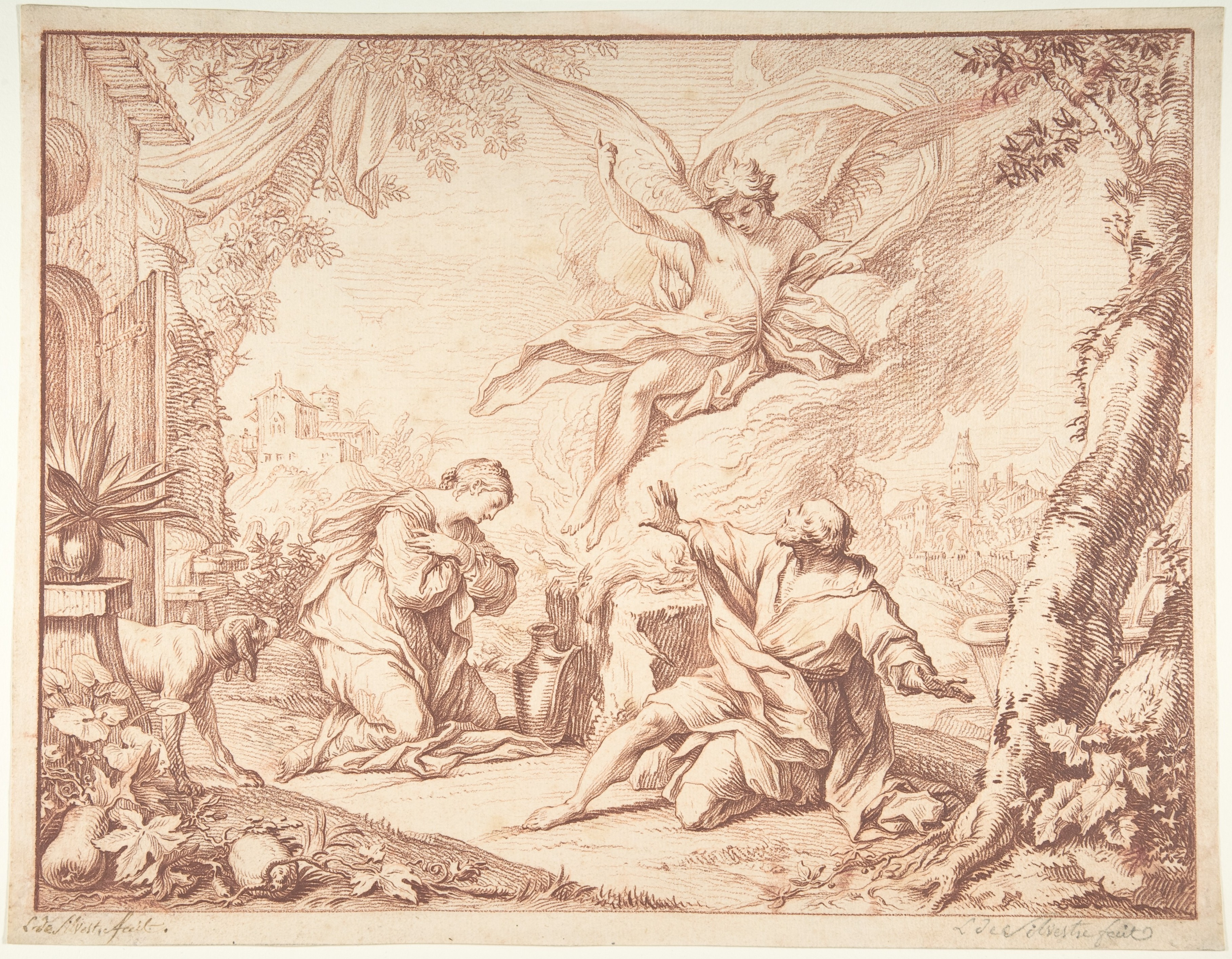
The Sacrifice of Manoah
