= Jean Dumont =

Jean Dumont may refer to:

- Jean Dumont (publicist) (1667–1727), French writer and historian
- Jean Dumont (wrestler) (1886–?), Belgian Greco-Roman wrestler
- Jean Dumont (historian) (1923–2001), French historian and publisher
- Jean Dumont (politician) (1930–2021), French politician
- Jean Dumont (cyclist) (born 1943), French road bicycle racer
