= André Dumont =

André Dumont may refer to:

- André Dumont (geologist)
- André Dumont (politician)
- André Dumont (cyclist)
