= Éric Dumont =

Éric Dumont may refer to:

- Éric Dumont (sailor), French yachtsman
- Éric Dumont-Baltet, French horticulturalist and nursery gardener
