= Septet (Beethoven) =

1800 chamber music composition by Ludwig van Beethoven

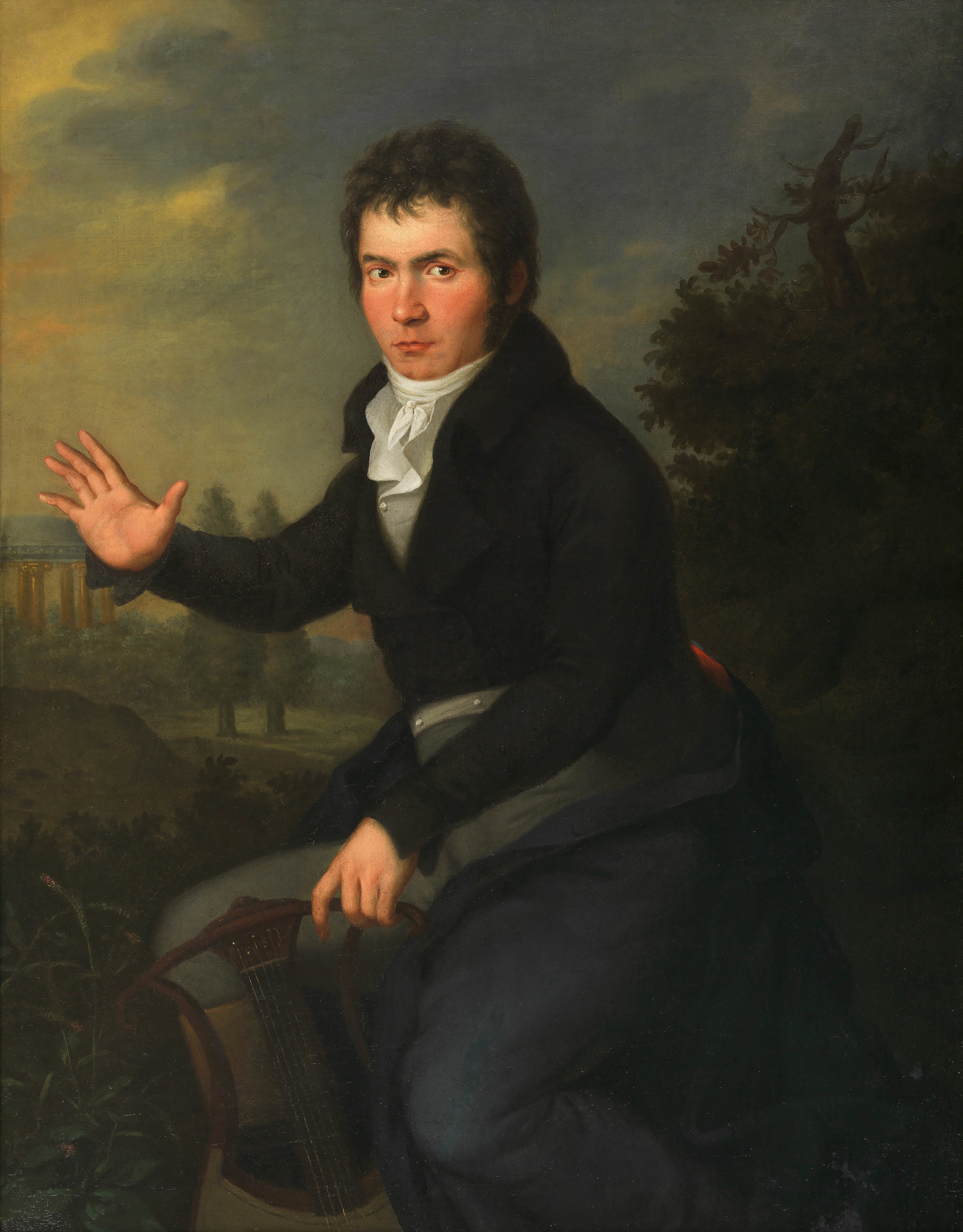
Portrait of Ludwig van Beethoven by Joseph Willibrord Mähler (c. 1804)

The Septet in E♭ major for clarinet, horn, bassoon, violin, viola, cello, and double bass, Op. 20, by Ludwig van Beethoven, was sketched out in 1799, completed, and first performed in Vienna in 1800 and published in 1802. The score contains the notation: "Der Kaiserin Maria Theresia gewidmet" (Dedicated to the Empress Maria Theresa). It was one of Beethoven’s most popular works during his lifetime, much to the composer's dismay. Several years later, Beethoven even wished the score to have been destroyed, saying: "That damn work! I wish it were burned!"

The concert was extremely popular in Paris where it was played for decades, often more than once a year by the Orchestre de la Société des Concerts du Conservatoire. At the auction of Beethoven's possessions after his death, the manuscript for his Missa solemnis fetched 7 florins, but the Septet was sold for 18 florins.

== Structure and analysis ==
Excerpt from 1st movement
Performed by the Ensemble Mediterrain

The composition is in six movements and runs approximately 40 minutes in performance:

1. Adagio – Allegro con brio (in E♭ major) (approx. 10 min.)
2. Adagio cantabile (in A♭ major) (approx. 9 min.)
3. Tempo di menuetto (in E♭ major) (approx. 3 min.)
4. Tema con variazioni: Andante (in B♭ major) (approx. 7 min.)
5. Scherzo: Allegro molto e vivace (in E♭ major) (approx. 3 min.)
6. Andante con moto alla marcia (in E♭ minor) – Presto (in E♭ major) (approx. 7 min.)

=== Analysis ===
The overall layout resembles a serenade and is in fact more or less the same as that of Mozart's string trio, K. 563, in the same key, but Beethoven expands the form by the addition of substantial introductions to the first and last movements and by changing the second minuet to a scherzo. Beethoven had already used the theme of the third movement in his Piano Sonata Op. 49 No. 2, which was an earlier work despite its higher opus number. The finale features a violin cadenza.

The scoring of the Septet for a single clarinet, horn and bassoon (rather than for pairs of these wind instruments) was innovative. So was the unusually prominent role of the clarinet, as important as the violin.

The Septet was one of Beethoven's most successful and popular works and circulated in many editions and arrangements for different forces. In about 1803, Beethoven himself arranged the work as a trio for clarinet (or violin), cello, and piano, and this version was published as his Op. 38 in 1805 in Vienna. Beethoven dedicated the Trio Op. 38 to Professor Johann Adam Schmidt (1759–1809), a German-Austrian surgeon and ophthalmologist, and a personal physician of Beethoven, whom he attended to from 1801 until 1809.

Conductor Arturo Toscanini rearranged the string section of the Septet so that it could be played by the full string section of the orchestra, but he did not change the rest of the scoring. He recorded the Septet for RCA Victor with the NBC Symphony Orchestra on 26 November 1951 in Carnegie Hall.

== Influence ==
Konrad Kreutzer (1780-1849) septet in E Flat follows Beethoven's sequence of mvts, instrumental layout & choice of E-flat key.

- Louis Spohr's Grand Nonet, Op. 31 (1813), was influenced by Beethoven's Septet
- Franz Schubert composed his 1824 Octet (in F major, D. 803) for the clarinetist Ferdinand Troyer who had requested a piece similar to Beethoven's Septet, and the works accordingly resemble each other in many ways. The Octet’s scoring is the same as the Septet with the addition of a second violin.
- In 1840, Franz Liszt arranged Beethoven's Septet for piano, first for two hands (S.465) and then for four hands (S.634). Several other piano arrangements have been published, by such figures as Carl Czerny, Ernst Pauer, Adolf Ruthardt, and Hugo Ulrich.
- Louise Farrenc's Nonet shares the E♭ major key with Beethoven's Septet and there is evidence of its influence on Farrenc.
- Peter Schickele parodied the Septet with P. D. Q. Bach's Schleptet in E♭ major, S.0. It requires humorous gags such as the horn player fainting and the musicians yelling “Hey!” in the finale. The double bass and clarinet are replaced by flute and oboe.
- British composer Peter Fribbins composed a septet (subtitled "The Zong Affair") for the same instrumentation as Beethoven's, but took his influence from J. M. W. Turner's painting The Slave Ship.

== In popular culture ==
- The theme song for the Spanish dub of the educational animated television series Once Upon a Time... Man is sung to the tune of the 3rd movement of the Septet. It was adapted by Rafael Trabucchelli and Agustín Serrano, has Spanish lyrics by Marisol Perales and José Luis Perales, and is performed by the children's group Caramelos.
