= Dumon =

Dumon is a surname, used primarily in Belgium. Notable people with the surname include:

- Andrée Dumon (1922–2025), Belgian resistance member during World War II., sister of Micheline
- Augustin Dumon-Dumortier (1791–1852), Belgian industrialist, diplomat and liberal politician
- Bibi Dumon Tak (born 1964), Dutch writer of children's literature
- Mariken Dumon (born 1983), Belgian glass artist
- Micheline Dumon (1921–2017), Belgian resistance member during World War II
- Pierre Sylvain Dumon (1797–1870), French lawyer and politician
- Detlef Dumon (born 1963), former Executive Director of the International Council of Sport Science and Physical Education and current school headmaster of the Stephanus-School in Berlin

== See also ==
- Dumont (surname), people named Dumont
