= Piano Quintet No. 2 =

Piano Quintet No. 2 may refer to:

- Piano Quintet No. 2 (Dvořák)
- Piano Quintet No. 2 (Farrenc)
- Piano Quintet No. 2 (Fauré)
