= Augustin-Alexandre Dumont =

French sculptor (1801–1884)

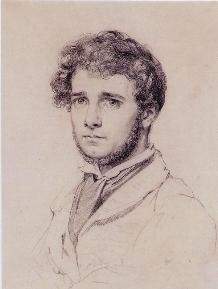
Auguste Dumont, in 1829, by Auguste-Hyacinthe Debay

Augustin-Alexandre Dumont (French pronunciation: [oɡystɛ̃ alɛksɑ̃dʁ dymɔ̃]), known as Auguste Dumont (4 August 1801– 28 January 1884) was a French sculptor.

== Biography ==
Augustin Dumont, 16 years old, by Jacques-Augustin-Catherine Pajou

Auguste Dumont was born and died in Paris. He was one of a long line of famous sculptors, the great-grandson of Pierre Dumont, son of Jacques-Edme Dumont, and the brother to pianist and composer Louise Farrenc. In 1818, he started studies at the École des Beaux-Arts in Paris, where he was a pupil of Pierre Cartellier. In 1823, he was awarded the Prix de Rome for his sculptures, and went to study at the French Academy in Rome.

In 1830, he returned to France. In 1853, he became a teacher at the École des Beaux-Arts. A disease kept him from working after 1875.

== Works ==
- Infant Bacchus Nurtured by the Nymph Leucothea (1830; Semur-en-Auxois, Musée Municipal)
- The Genius of Liberty atop the July Column in the Place de la Bastille, Paris (1833)
- Statue of Nicolas Poussin for the Salle Ordinaire des Séances in the Palais de l'Institut de France, Paris (1835)
- Statue of Maréchal Thomas Bugeaud de la Piconnerie (~1850; version, Versailles)
- Statue of Napoleon I atop the column in Place Vendôme, Paris (1863)
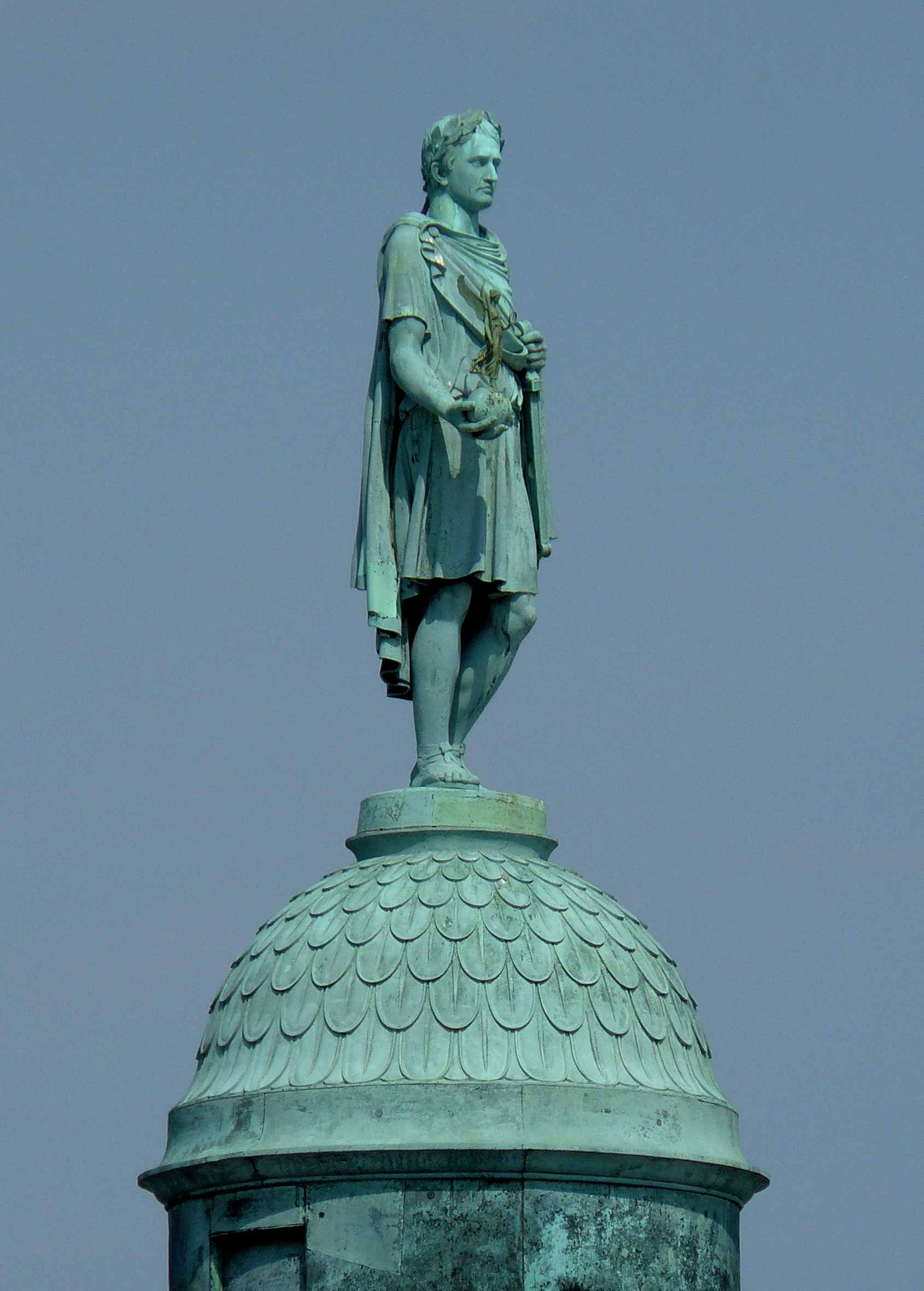
Napoleon on the Vendôme Column

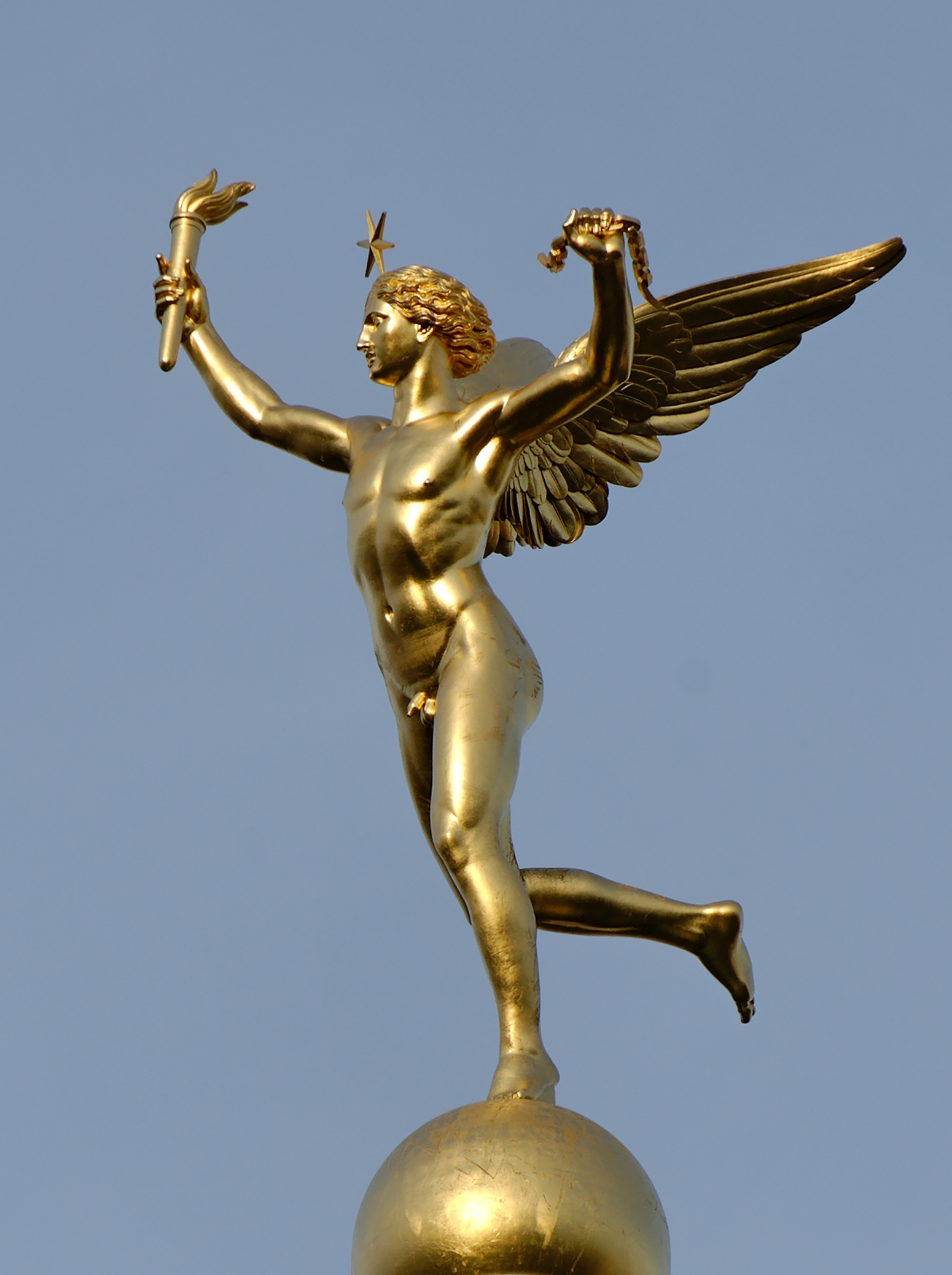
The Genius of Liberty (1833)
