= Yves Pérotin =

French archivist (1922–1981)

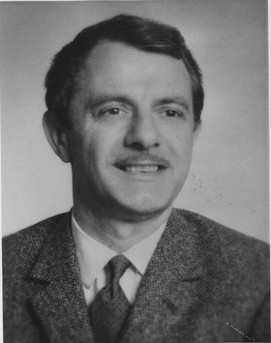

Yves Pérotin (15 July 1922 – 2 March 1981) was a French archivist and historian.

He is most notable for his contribution to archival science in French-speaking countries, such as spreading the 'three ages of archives' theory (inspired by rules in use in Italy and German-speaking countries) and the first attempts to adapt records management procedures he had seen in the US and the UK to a French context.

== Life ==
Born in Bordeaux, he joined the École nationale des chartes in 1942. He joined the FFI at the end of his first year of study, taking part in the Vercors maquis operations in summer 1944 and the Alsace campaign in 11th Cuirassier Regiment of 1st French Army, in which he gained four citations, the Croix de Guerre and Resistance Medal for his conduct under fire. Resuming his studies, his thesis on the collegial chapter of Saint-Seurin de Bordeaux from its origins in 1462 gained him an archivist-palaeographer diploma in 1948.

He was director of the Archives départementales of Lot-et-Garonne (1948–1952), of la Réunion (1952–1958), of the Seine (1958–1966) and of Var (1971–1972). He was archivist to the United Nations (1966–1969) and the International Work Office of the World Health Organization (August 1972 – July 1974), before ending his career at the Archives départementales of Pyrénées-Orientales (July 1974 – May 1981) He died in Perpignan.

== Publications ==
=== Professional ===
- Archives départementales de Lot-et-Garonne. Répertoire numérique de la série III E, notaires: by René Bonnat and Robert Marquant, reviewed and completed by Louis Desgraves and Yves Pérotin", Agen, impr. de Laborde, 1950, 135 p.
- Albert Lougnon, Yves Pérotin (preface), Documents concernant les îles de Bourbon et de France pendant la règle de la Compagnie des Indes : répertoire de pièces conservées dans divers dépôts d'archives de Paris, Archives départementales de La Réunion, 1953, 202 p.
- Albert Lougnon, Auguste Toussaint, Yves Pérotin (preface), Classement et inventaire du fonds de la Compagnie des Indes série C: 1665–1767, Archives départementales de La Réunion, 1956, 392 p.
- École pratique des hautes études (France). Section des sciences économiques et sociales, Elizabeth von Fürer-Haimendorf, Yves Pérotin, Indian Ocean International Historical Association, Monde d'outre-mer, passé et présent: Bibliographies et instruments de travail, Mouton, 1958, 748 p.
- Manuel d'archivistique tropicale, Paris-La Haye, Mouton, 1966.
- Guide des archives de la Société des nations: 1919–1946, Paris, Direction des Archives de France, 1969, 97 p.

=== International consulting ===
- Algérie: archives publiques, UNESCO, 1964, 64 p.
- Maroc: préservation et classification des archives : novembre 1968-février 1969, UNESO, 1969, 32 p.
- Perú, reorganización de los archivos, novembre a diciembre de 1969, UNESCO, 1969, 54 p.
- Iraq: Organization of archives, UNESCO, 1970, 27 p.

=== Studies ===
- "Les chapitres bordelais contre Charles VII", Annales du midi, vol. 63, 1951, p. 33-42
- "Les anciens couvents d'Augustins dans les diocèses d'Agen, Bazas et Condom", Revue de l'Agenais, vol. 82, 1956, p. 185-193.
- Chroniques de Bourbon, Nérac, Couderc, 1957, 226 p.
- Herbert Mondon, Eugène Massinot, René Legras, Yves Pérotin, Collèges ecclésiastiques et petits séminaires à la Réunion, 1964, 112 p.
- "L'administration et les trois âges des archives", Seine et Paris, No. 20, octobre 1961, p. 1-4 (English-language version : "Administration and the 'Three Ages' of Archives", The American Archivist, No. 29-3, 1966, p. 363-369).
- " Archives de la Seine et de la ville de Paris. Le Records management et l'administration américaine des archives: Rapport de mission adressé à M. le Préfet de la Seine", par Yves Pérotin, directeur des Services d'archives de la Seine et de la ville de Paris, Paris, imp. municipale, 51 p.
- "Le Records Management et l'administration anglaise des archives", Gazette des archives, No. 44, 1964, p. 5-17.
- "Le grenier de l'histoire et les récoltes excédentaires", Gazette des archives, No. 50, 1965, p. 131-143.
- Roussillon ou Catalogne-Nord. La liberté et l'histoire, postface de Jacques Queralt, Cahier N°1 de TRUC, Perpignan, 1er trimestre 1978, 96 p.
- "L'attitude politique des chapitres bordelais sous Charles VII et ses conséquences", Actes des Congrès d'Etudes Régionales I – VII de la Fédération Historique du Sud-Ouest 1948 – 1954, 1997, p. 174

=== Autobiography ===
- La vie inimitable – Dans les maquis du Trièves et du Vercors en 1943 et 1944, Presses universitaires de Grenoble, 2014, 454 p.

=== Novels ===
- De quoi riaient-ils?, Hachette, 1966, 187 p.
- Manchego, Calmann-Lévy, 1972, 284 p.

== Bibliography ==
- Yves Pérotin, 1922–1981 : l'archiviste inimitable, École Nationale des Chartes, 2024, 326 p.
