= Piano Quintet No. 1 (Farrenc) =

The Piano Quintet No. 1 in A minor, Op. 30, was composed by the French composer Louise Farrenc in 1839. The quintet is scored for piano, violin, viola, cello, and double bass.

This piece adheres to the standard four-movement form:

1. Allegro (in A minor and in sonata form, ends in A major)
2. Adagio non troppo (in E major and in "ABACABA" form with an additional coda)
3. Scherzo (Presto) (in A minor and in ternary form, with a "trio" section in A major)
4. Finale (Allegro) (in A minor and in sonata form)

== See also ==
- Piano Quintet No. 2 (Farrenc)
