= Jacques-Edme Dumont =

French sculptor

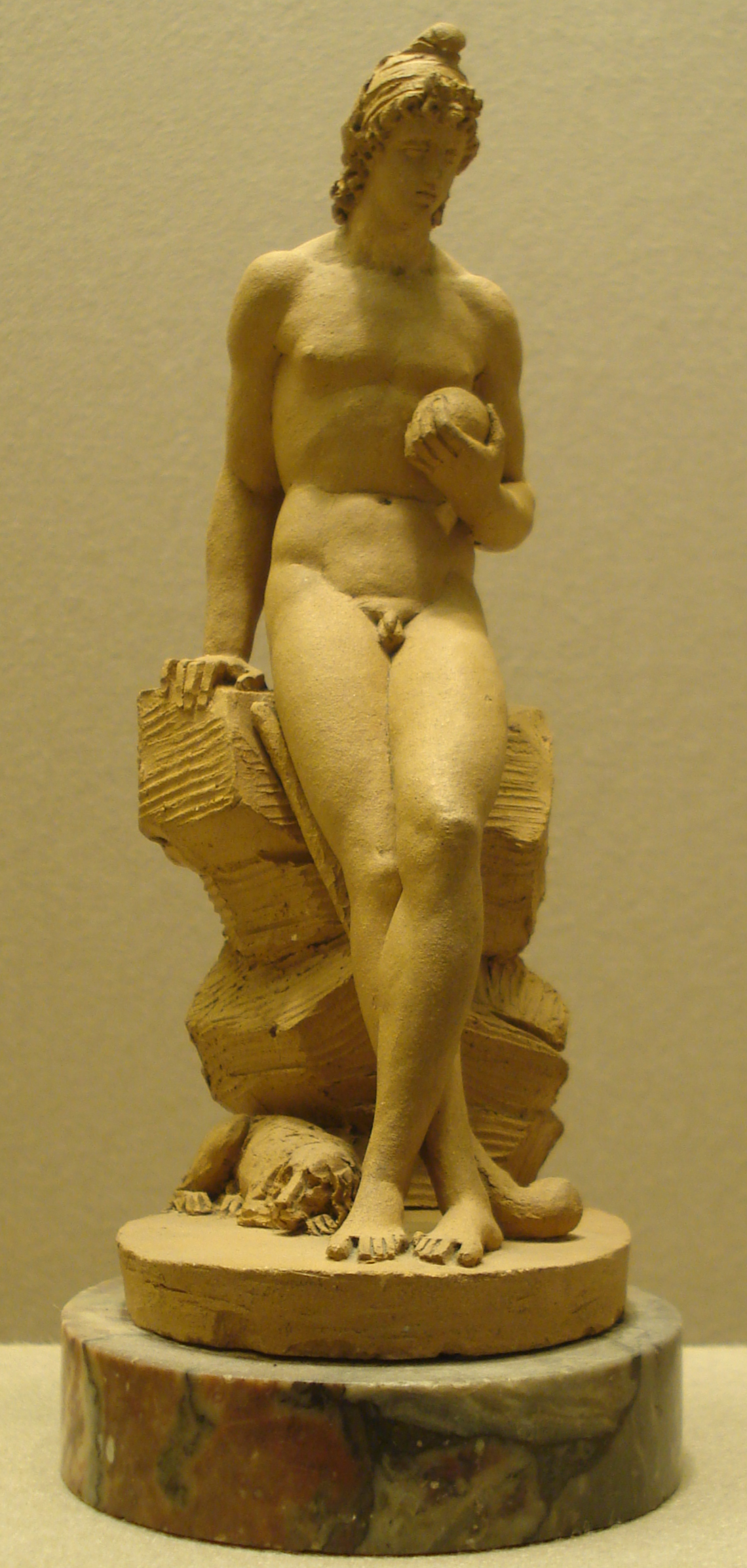
Dumont's terracotta statuette of the mythological Paris, c. 1795

Jacques-Edme Dumont (10 April 1761 – 21 February 1844) was a French sculptor.

Dumont was born and died in Paris. He came from a dynasty of sculptors that included his great-grandfather Pierre Dumont, grandfather François Dumont, father Edme Dumont and son Augustin-Alexandre Dumont.

He was a pupil of Augustin Pajou, and in 1788 he won the Prix de Rome. From 1788 to 1793, he lived in Italy, after which he returned to his native France, in the hope a commission from the National Convention during the French Revolution. However he secured no such commission, and began producing small statuettes and medallions for sale. Later, he received commissions for statues of Louis Henri, Duke of Bourbon, François Séverin Marceau-Desgraviers, and Jean-Baptiste Colbert. During the Bourbon Restoration, Dumont made a monument to Guillaume-Chrétien de Lamoignon de Malesherbes (1819) and a statue of French general Charles Pichegru, which has since been destroyed.

Dumont was a portrait sculptor as well, notable examples of his work including a bust of his mother, Marie-Françoise Berthault, and Marie Louise, Duchess of Parma and wife of Napoleon (1810).

He was also the father of virtuoso pianist, teacher and composer Louise Farrenc (née Jeanne-Louise Dumont).
