= Marius Barroux =

French archivist

Marius Barroux (10 December 1862 – 18 March 1939) was a French historian and archivist. The Allée Marius-Barroux in Paris is named after him.

== Life ==
He was born in the 14th arrondissement of Paris to Elphège Léon Barroux (part of the Préfet de la Seine's staff, who rose to chef de bureau in the prefecture of the Seine's administration) and his milliner wife Mathilde Estelle Pruvost. Marius studied at the École des chartes and gained an archivist-palaeographer diploma in 1885 thanks to a thesis on Jacques de Vitry, bishop of Acre and historian of the Fifth Crusade. He next studied at the École pratique des hautes études and graduated with licences in letters and law.

His first job was at the Archives Nationales, where he catalogued the papers of Port-Royal, in which he discovered lost acts relating to Blaise Pascal. He then moved to the Archives de la Seine on 1 February 1886. He spent the rest of his career there and reorganised it, initially as an assistant archivist then from 1 February 1906 as head archivist. He was made an Officier de l'Instruction publique and on 20 April 1921 made a knight of the Legion of Honour. He retired at the end of 1928.

He, Eugène-Humbert Guitard, Ferdinand Brunot, Camille Bloch and Emmanuel Rodocanachi were founder members of the Société d'histoire de la pharmacie. He was also one of those who directed the publication of the Dictionnaire de biographie française.

=== Family ===
By his marriage to Lucie Candelot he had:

- André Barroux (1896–1951), palaeographer-archivist
- Robert Barroux (1899–1960), palaeographer-archivist
- Maxime Barroux (1908–1969), student at the École polytechnique, civil engineer at the École nationale supérieure des télécommunications, engineer-general for telecommunications, publisher of Les émetteurs de radiodiffusion et de télévision (PUF, 1967) in the "Que sais-je" series.

== Publications ==
- L'accroissement des séries anciennes aux archives de la Seine de 1889 à 1896. État sommaire, Imprimerie de H. Bouillant, Saint-Denis, 1896 (online version)
- Les sources de l'ancien état civil parisien. Répertoire critique, Honoré Champion éditeur, Paris, 1898 (online version)
- avec Paul Dorveaux, Historique de la bibliothèque de l'École de pharmacie de Paris, suivi de l'Analyse du premier registre des archives de l'École de pharmacie, imprimerie Jacquin, Besançon, 1906
- Essai de bibliographie critique des généralités de l'histoire de Paris, Honoré Champion éditeur, Paris, 1908 (online version)
- avec Henri Lemoine, Archives du département de la Seine et de la ville de Paris. État par séries des documents antérieurs au mois de juin 1871, Desfossés, 1925 ; 42 p.
- Le département de la Seine et la ville de Paris. Notions générales et bibliographiques pour en étudier l'histoire, Imprimerie de J. Dumoulin, Paris, 1910 (online version)
- Chartes antérieures a Saint Louis, 1112–1224, Archives du Département de la Seine et de la Ville de Paris, 1929 ; 29 p.
- Les fêtes royales de Saint-Denis en mai 1389, Les Amis de Saint-Denys, 1936 ; 116 p.

== Bibliography (in French) ==
- André Lesort, Nécrologie. Marius Barroux, in Bibliothèque de l'École des chartes, 1940, Volume 101, no. 1, p. 255–260 (online version).
- Pierre Debofle, « Une famille de chartistes parisiens, les Barroux (1862–1960) », in Bulletin de la Société de l'histoire de Paris et de l'Île-de-France, 1976, p, 191–209 (online version).
