= Georges-François-Marie Gabriel =

French painter

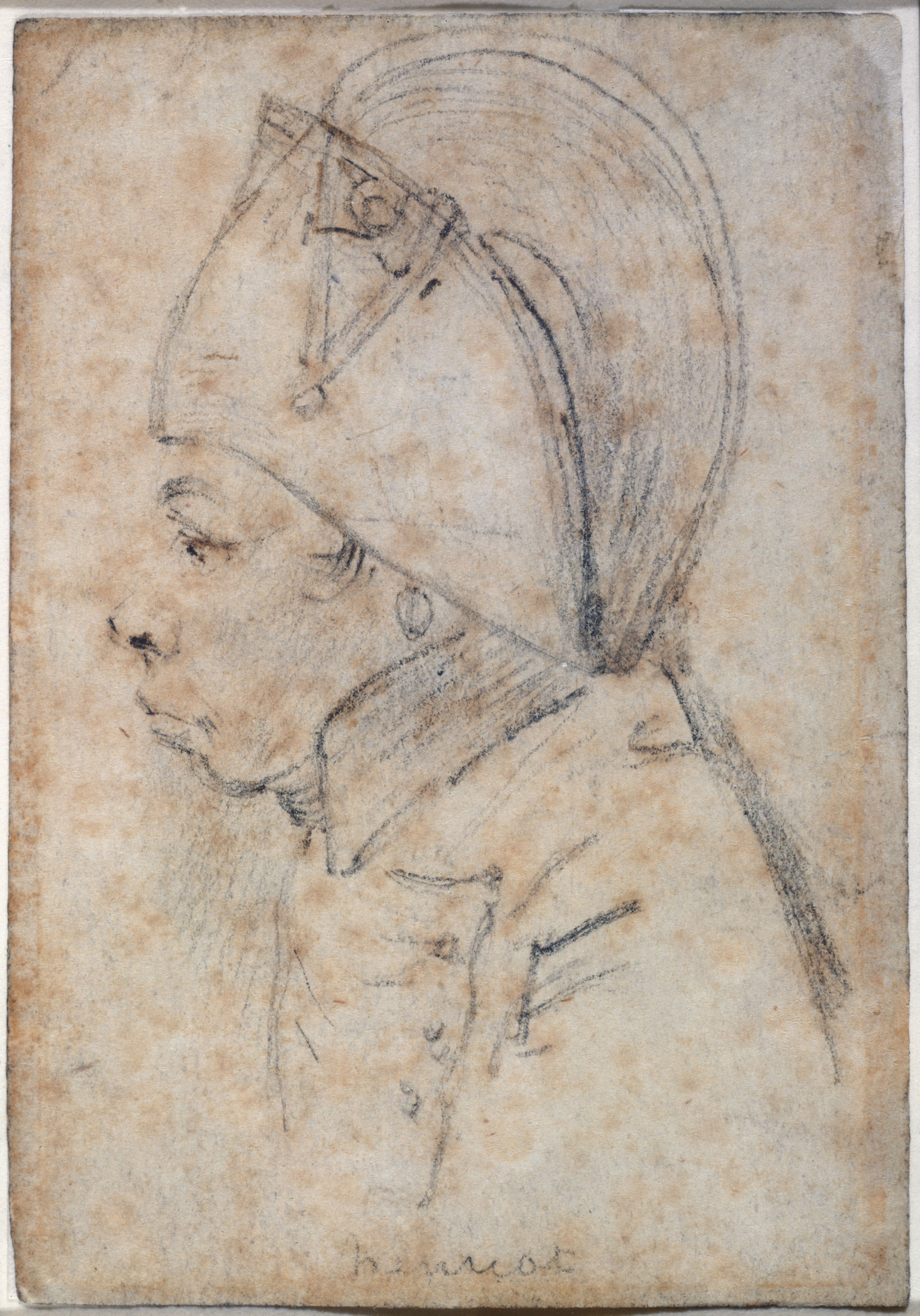
François Hanriot by Gabriel, drawing now in the Carnavalet Museum

Georges-François-Marie Gabriel (1775 – January 1, 1865) was a French miniature painter and designer. Born in Paris, he was a pupil of Naigeon and Regnault. Among his designs are those ordered by the French Government for the great work of the Institute on Egypt; and among his portraits is one of Madame de Maintenon, engraved by Mécou, which forms the frontispiece to her memoirs by Lafont d'Ausonne. Gabriel died January 1, 1865, in the 14th arrondissement of Paris.

== Bibliography ==
=== References ===
- Death Certificate (January 1, 1865). "11. Gabriel, Georges-François". (Actes d'état civil [Civil Status Records] → Actes de décès [Death Certificates] (1860–1986) → 20 arrondissements [20 Districts] → "14^{e} Arrondissement municipal de Paris" [14th municipal arrondissement of Paris] → page 1 → digital image 3 (of 31). Death Certificate No. 11. Cote [Clause] V4E 1743). V4E1743. Archives de Paris (fr).
- This article incorporates text from a publication now in the public domain: Bryan, Michael (1886). "Gabriel, Georges François Marie". In Graves, Robert Edmund (ed.). Bryan's Dictionary of Painters and Engravers (A–K). Vol. I (3rd ed.). London: George Bell & Sons.
