= Nonet (Farrenc) =

1849 chamber music composition by Louise Farrenc

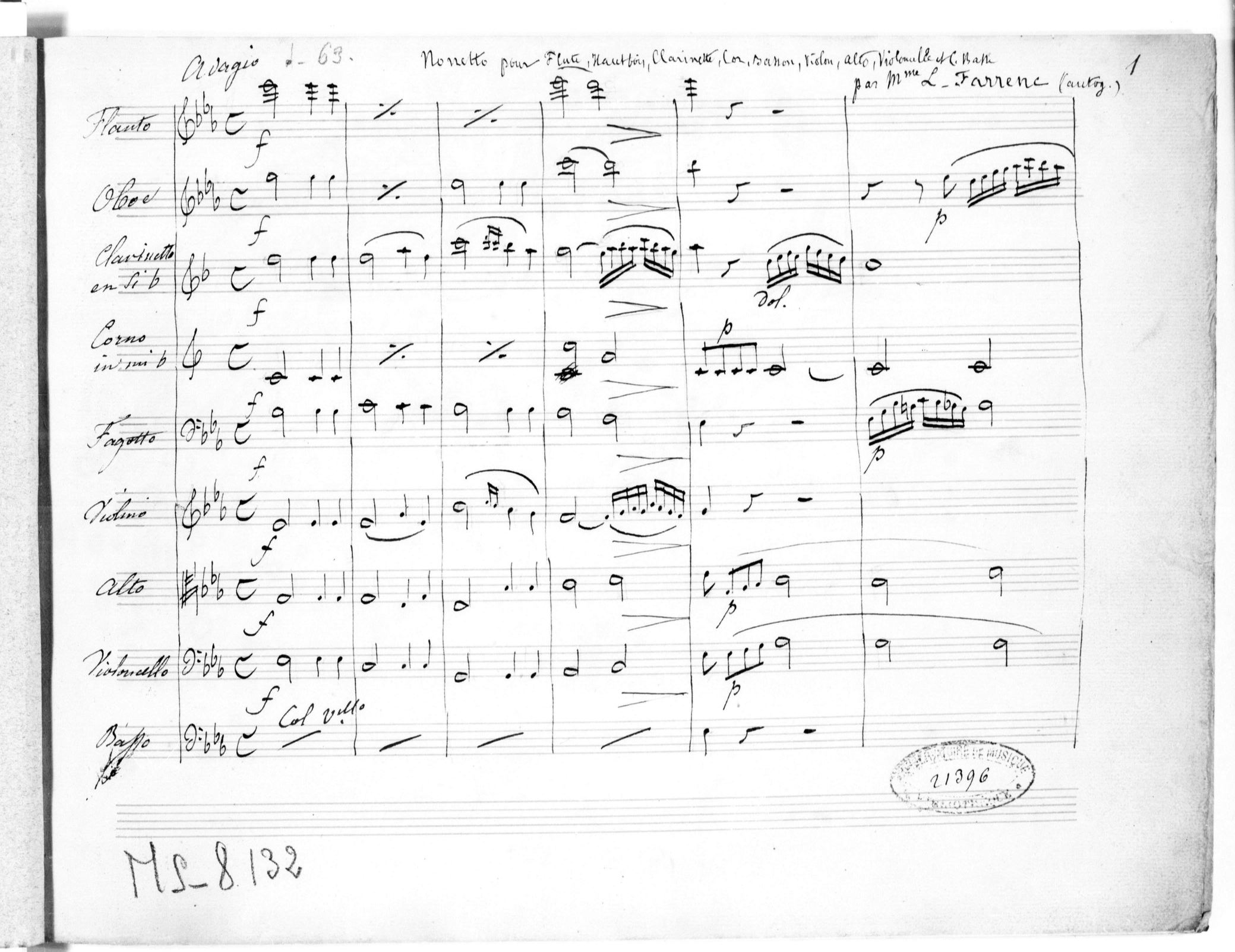
Page 1 of the manuscript

The Nonet in E♭ major, Op. 38, is an 1849 composition for chamber ensemble by French composer Louise Farrenc.

In line with the tradition established by Louis Spohr, it is scored for a combined string quartet and wind quintet: flute, oboe, clarinet, French horn, bassoon, violin, viola, cello, double bass. The double bass is sometimes replaced by a contrabassoon.

The manuscript, dated November 1849, is held at the Bibliothèque nationale de France. Farrenc also arranged the Nonet for string quintet. The work was not printed in Farrenc's lifetime.

== Composition and premiere ==
Farrenc, a piano performer, composed mainly for solo piano and chamber music for ensembles with piano; the Nonet was her only chamber composition without a piano. It was first played in a private performance in the salon of Sophie Pierson-Bodin (1819–1874) on 23 December 1849, and repeated there a few days later, with Auguste-Antoine Guerreau substituting for Théophile Tilmant (violin), Charles Lebouc (cello), Achille Gouffé (double bass), Louis Dorus (flute), Stanislas Verroust (oboe), Hyacinthe Klosé (clarinet), Joseph-François Rousselot (horn), Charles Verroust (bassoon). The public premiere of the Nonet took place on 19 March 1850 at the Salle Érard. with the 19-year-old Joseph Joachim playing the violin and Adolphe Blanc (viola), Charles Lebouc (cello), Achille Gouffé (double bass), Louis Dorus (flute)), Stanislas Verroust (oboe), Adolphe Leroy (clarinet), Joseph-François Rousselot (horn), Charles Verroust (bassoon). Its positive reception made Farrenc a near-celebrity and led the Paris Conservatory to raise her salary in line with its male professors.

== Structure ==
The Nonet consists of four movements and takes about 30 minutes to perform:

1. Adagio – Allegro
2. Andante con moto
3. Scherzo, Vivace
4. Adagio – Allegro

The slow opening in common time of the first movement establishes the tonality, E♭ major, similar to Beethoven's Septet (1799). The Allegro, in 3/4 time,

The violin establishes the theme of the second movement, followed by four variations in different instrument combinations. The coda brings the ensemble together, followed by a brief bass interlude before a colourful close.

The third movement is characterized by dotted eighth notes and syncopation. The strings use pizzicatos and the music moves in chromatic passages.

The fourth movement opens with block chords from the strings to which the winds and upper strings respond. A cadenza by the oboe and a call by the horn close the opening Adagio. The theme of the Allegro, introduced by the vioin, is quickly passed around the other instruments. Unusual pairings of instruments create unexpected effects. Fast scale runs lead to ensemble block chords, before returning to the home key of E♭ major.

== Recordings ==
- 2005: Louise Farrenc - Chamber Music, Naïve Records V5033
- 2010: Jeanne-Louise Farrenc: Nonet & Clarinet Trio, Consortium Classicum, Divox CDX29205
- 2011: Farrenc: Nonet & Brahms: Serenade No. 1, Minerva Chamber Ensemble, Centaur Records CRC3092
- 2022: Arc, Intercontinental Ensemble, TRPTK TTK 0080
- 2026: Farrenc & Eberl: Beyond Classical Horizons, Australian Romantic & Classical Orchestra
