= Victorine Farrenc =

French pianist and composer (1826–1859)

- Born: Victorine Louise Farrenc; 23 February 1826; Paris, France
- Died: 3 January 1859 (aged 32); Paris, France
- Occupations: Pianist; composer

Victorine Louise Farrenc (23 February 1826 – 3 January 1859) was a French pianist and composer of the Romantic period.

== Life and career ==
Victorine Louise Farrenc was born in Paris, France on 23 February 1826. A child prodigy in music, she was the daughter of composer-pianist Louise Farrenc and scholar Aristide Farrenc. In her youth she studied piano with her mother, Louise, and took compositions lessons, composing piano works.

In 1843, Farrenc enrolled in the Conservatoire de Paris for piano, and won the premier prix in 1844. She performed Beethoven's Piano Concerto No. 5, the "Emperor" in the 1845 Brussels-Paris concerts, where her mother's Symphony No. 1 premiered. Her stage appearances lessened in 1847 after a serious illness; by 1849 she had ceased performing. She died on 3 January 1859 in Paris.
