= Hyacinthe de Gauréault Dumont =

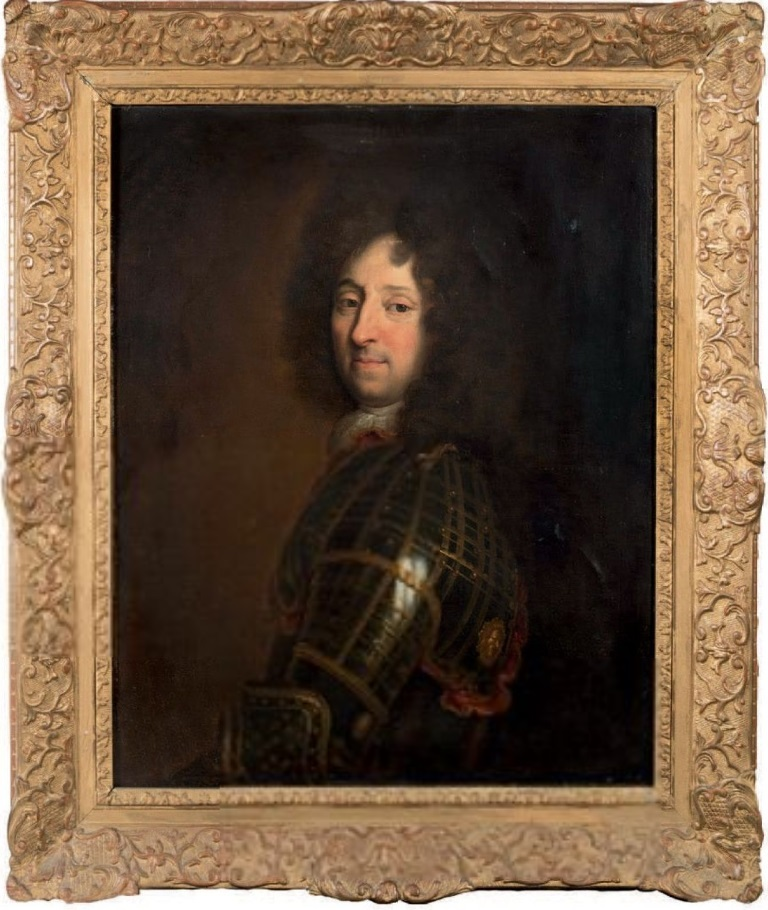
Portrait of Hyacinthe Dumont, French scholl, circa 1700-1720. 79 x 63 cm. Auction at Drouot, 7 December 2016.

Hyacinthe de Gauréault Dumont (or Du Mont), called Dumont (1647 - 16 March 1726) was a French administrator.

First chamber valet of Monseigneur, son of Louis XIV, he was appointed governor of the Château de Meudon from 1706 until his death. He also co-directed the Paris Opera with Jean-Nicolas de Francine, at the beginning of the 18th century.

== Life ==
Born in 1647, he was a squire of Monseigneur (the Dauphin). He had been detached from the King's Little Stable to take care of the prince's horses. In this capacity, he directed the stud farm of Louis XIV's son in Normandy, apparently created in May 1693, and located on the edge of the forest of Saint-Sauveur-le-Vicomte, not far from the fiefdom of Dumont. This stud farm housed about ten stallions. In 1705, Dumont was replaced at the head of this establishment by his nephew, Henri de Casaus, who later became an inspector of the stud farms of the Généralité.

On Friday, December 5, 1698, Philippe de Courcillon de Dangeau notes in his diary that at Meudon: "The King, at the prayer of Monseigneur, continued Francine's Privilege of the Opera for 10 years, provided he gives a quarter of the profit to Gaureault Dumont, Monseigneur's squire, and in addition that he gives 1.000 écus of pension to Jean Bérain the Elder, famous decorator, 1,000 écus of pension to Pascal Collasse, one of the four masters of the King's Music, and 1,000 francs of pension to Mademoiselle Rochouat[Le Rochois], who sang for a long time at the Opéra with great applause. Monseigneur had almost never asked the King for anything for private individuals, and he seemed to be very interested in that.") On October 7, 1704, Dumont transferred his rights in the privilege of the Opera to Pierre Guyenet. He was thus co-director of the Opera with Francine, from 1698 to 1704.

Over the years, he had become an intimate friend of Monseigneur, but without leaving his original body.

On the day of the death of Michel Thomassin, known as "Joyeux", on April 22, 1706, Monseigneur granted Hyacinthe de Gauréault Dumont the title of Governor of the castles of Meudon and Chaville, to whom the King granted 20,000 pounds of mortgages, according to Dangeau.

With the death of Monseigneur, on April 14, 1711, in Meudon, and before his father Louis XIV, Dumont lost all the hope he had placed in the heir to the throne, of which he was one of his close friends. The Duke of Burgundy, son of Monseigneur, then offered him a ring of 2,000 pistoles that had belonged to the prince. Provisions dated 16 March 1717 confirmed his position as Governor of Meudon. He died on March 16, 1726. Upon his death, his grandson, the marquis de Pellevé, also became Governor of the Château de Meudon.

== Judgment by Saint-Simon ==
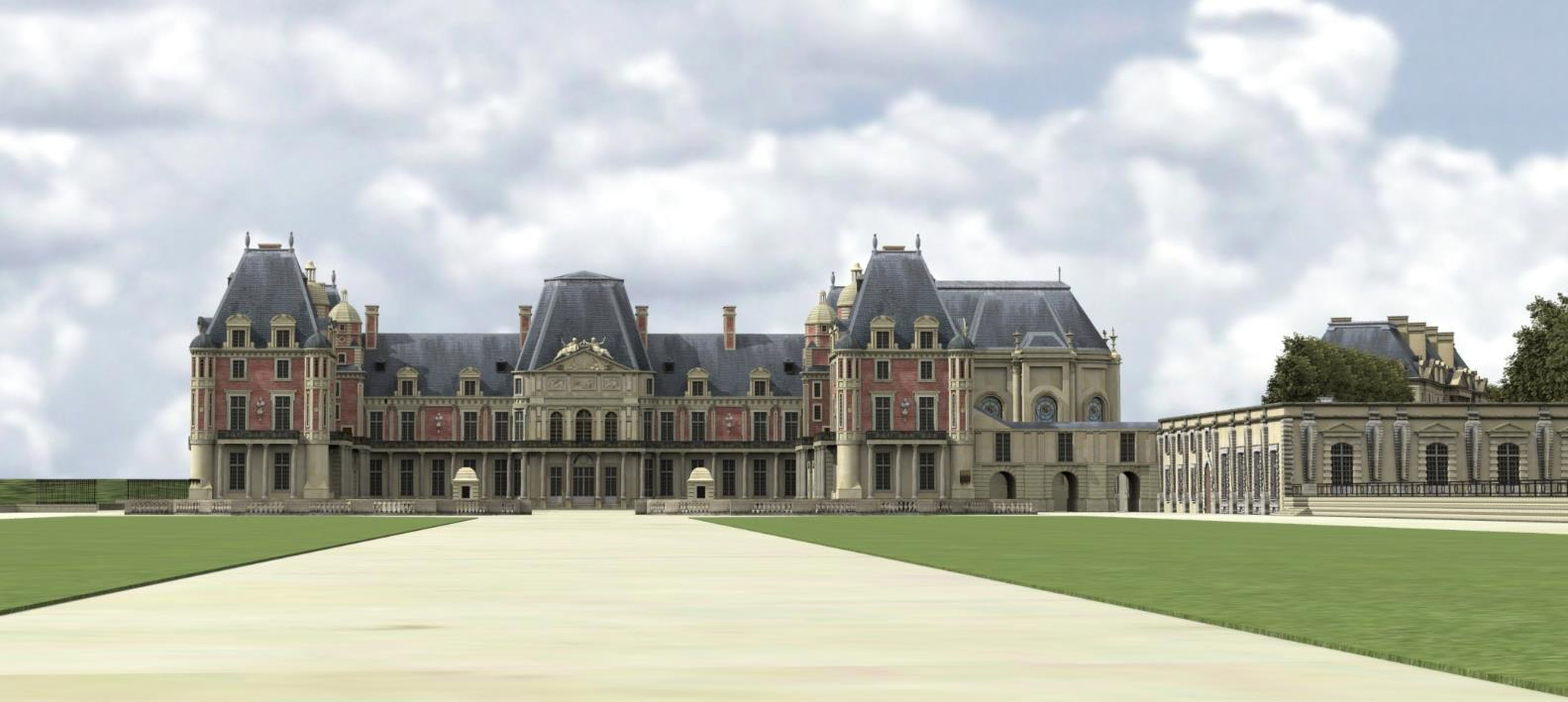
Château de Meudon at the time of Dumont, circa 1715.

Saint-Simon mentions him many times in his Mémoires.
