= André Dumont (politician) =

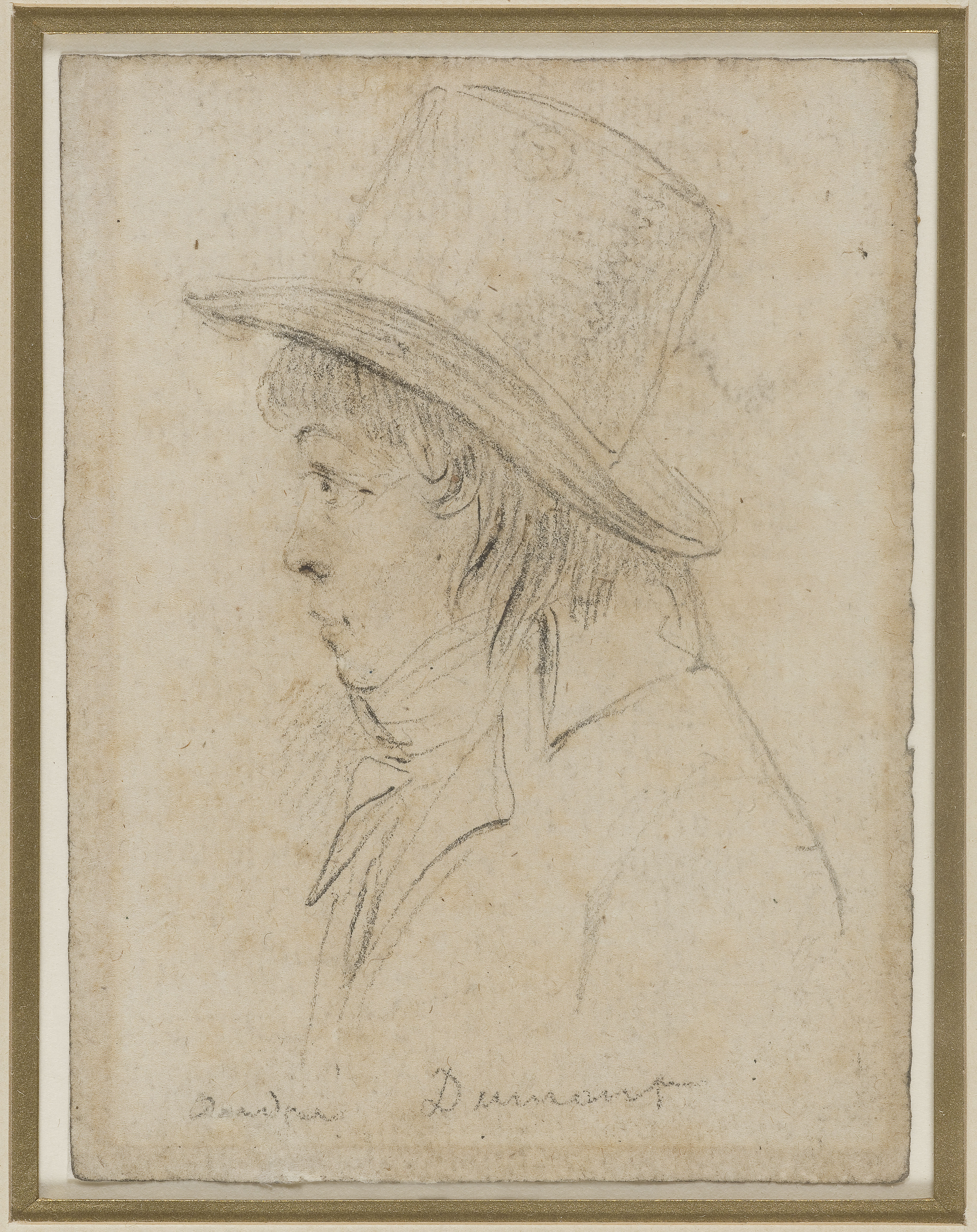
- André Dumont. Sketch drawn by Georges-François-Marie Gabriel (Musée Carnavalet)

51st President of the National Convention
- In office 22 September – 7 October 1794
- Preceded by: André Antoine Bernard
- Succeeded by: Jean-Jacques-Régis de Cambacérès

Personal details
- Born: 24 May 1764; Oisemont, Kingdom of France
- Died: 19 October 1818 (aged 54); Abbeville
- Political party: The Mountain

André Dumont (24 May 1764 at Oisemont – 19 October 1838 at Abbeville), was a French parliamentarian, deputy for the Somme of the National Convention, and an administrator of the First Empire. He was banished from France in 1816 due to involvement in the death of Louis XVI.
