= Léon Dumont =

French psychologist and philosopher (1837–1877)

Léon Dumont (February 5, 1837 in Valenciennes – January 17, 1877 in Valenciennes) was a French psychologist and philosopher. He influenced William James and is perhaps best known for his treatise on the causes of laughter (Des causes du rire).

== Dumont's closing thoughts from the last page of Des causes du rire ==
The miserable beggar said to the King of France, "Thy image is everywhere except in my pocket." One has seen that to laugh is to disarm hate and anger and to extract from some judges indulgence for a sin. In a word, the good joke, applied appropriately to any subject, has the effect of sweetening the deal for us: Ridiculum acri fortius et melius magnus plerumque secat res. - Horace (A good joke often cuts an important deal strongly and sweetly.) But, like any free action, the joke submits to the law of morality; the joke is virtuous or the joke is evil. In general, the joke only has moral value in the mouth of a morally serious person.

== See also ==
=== See for evidence that Dumont influenced Williams James ===
- The Principles of Psychology In Chapter 4, William James praises Dumont's De l'habitude, Revue Philosophique, TOME I, pages 321-366.

=== See other topics related to Léon Dumont ===
- History of biology#Nineteenth century: the emergence of biological disciplines
- History of psychology#Early French

== Selected works ==
- Des causes du rire (1862)
- Jean Paul et sa poétique (1862)
- Le Sentiment du gracieux (1863)
- Antoine Watteau (1866)
- Théorie de l'évolution en Allemagne (1873)
- Théorie Scientifique de la Sensibilité (1875)
- De l'habitude (1876)
- La théorie de la sensibilité (1876)
  - Vergnügen und Schmerz : zur Lehre von den Gefühlen (Théorie scientifique de la sensibilité, dt.) Autoris. Ausg. Leipzig : Brockhaus, 1876 (Internationale Wissenschaftliche Bibliothek ; 22)
