= Bernard Dumont (fencer) =

French fencer (born 1946)

Personal information
- Born: 30 November 1946 (age 79)

Sport
- Sport: Fencing

Bernard Dumont (French pronunciation: [bɛʁnaʁ dymɔ̃]; born 30 November 1946) is a French fencer. He competed in the team sabre events at the 1972 and 1976 Summer Olympics.
