= Marie-Alice Dumont =

Canadian photographer

Marie-Alice Dumont (October 10, 1892 – 1985) was a Canadian photographer living in Quebec. She is thought to be the first professional woman photographer in eastern Quebec.

She was born in Saint-Alexandre-de-Kamouraska and learned photography from her brother Abbé Napoléon Dumont. Dumont later studied with a professional photographer Ulric Lavoie from Rivière-du-Loup. In 1925, she opened a commercial photography studio in her home town. Dumont photographed people and landscapes of the Kamouraska region. She closed her studio in 1960 due to illness.

She died in Saint-Alexandre at the age of 92.

Dumont donated about 10,000 negatives to the Musée du Bas-Saint-Laurent shortly before her death. The museum has since held several exhibitions of her work.
