= Edme Dumont =

French sculptor

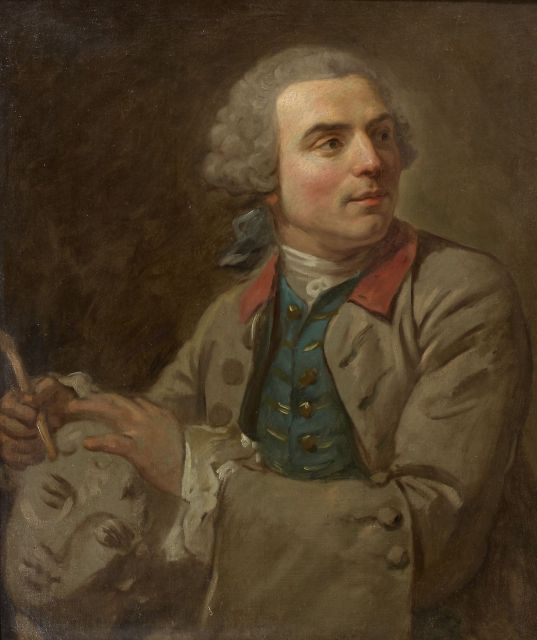
Portrait of Edme Dumont at work

Edme Dumont (1720–1775) was a French sculptor.

Dumont was born into a family of sculptors: his father was François Dumont, his grandfather Pierre Dumont. He received his first lessons from his father, and was admitted to the Académie royale de peinture et de sculpture in 1768, with his reception piece Milo of Croton. He married Marie Berthault and they had a son, the sculptor Jacques-Edme Dumont. On 10 November 1775 he died at his home at the Louvre Palace and was buried the next day in the Holy Innocents' Cemetery.

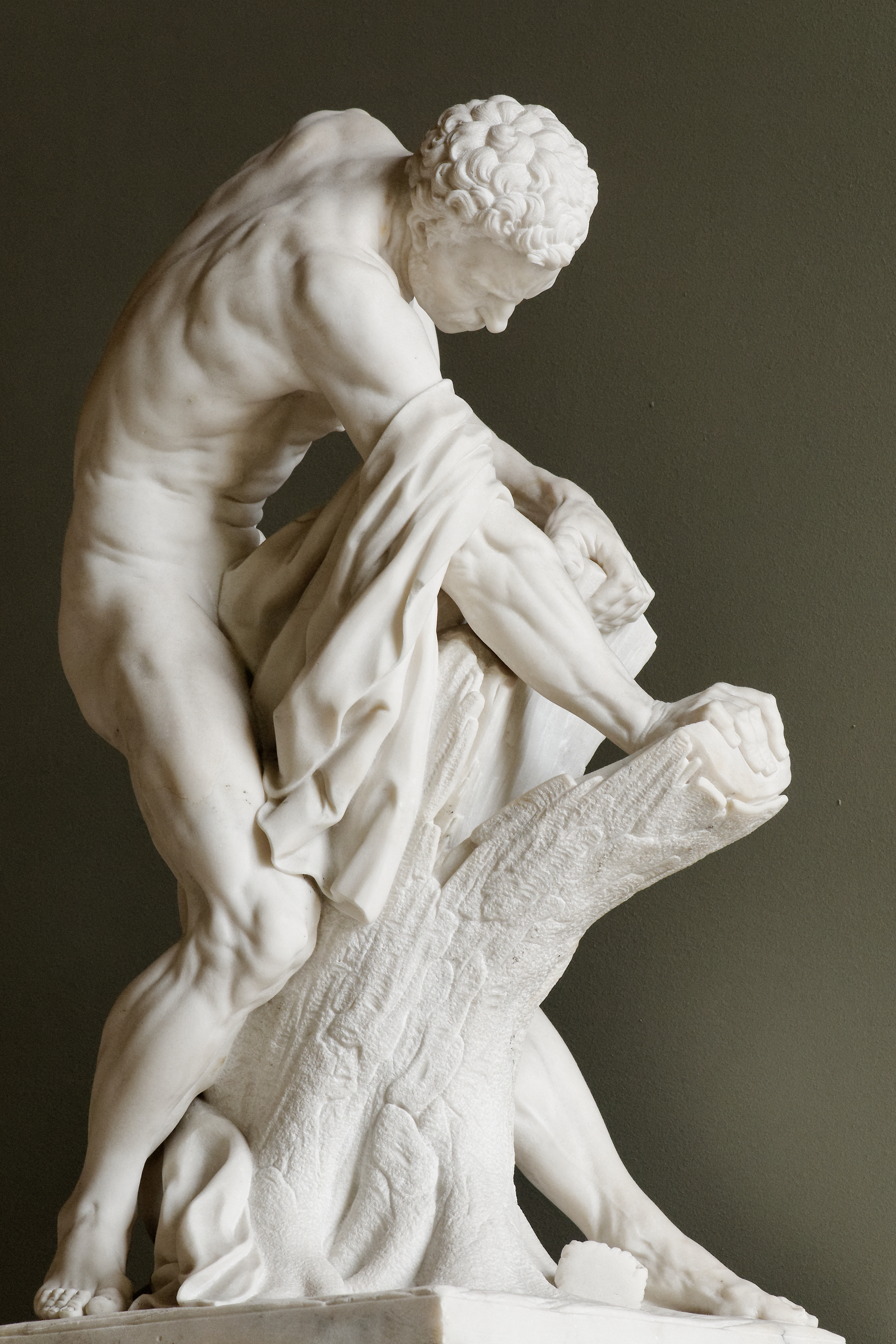
Milo of Croton by François Dumont, reception piece for the Académie royale de peinture et de sculpture, The Louvre, 1768
