= Delree Dumont =

Cree artist

- Born: Chilliwack, British Columbia, Canada
- Known for: Painter
- Movement: Pointillism
- Website: https://delreedumont.ca/

Delree Dumont is a Cree artist whose family is from Onion Lake Cree Nation.

== Early life and education ==
Dumont was born in Chilliwack, British Columbia and is a member of Onion Lake Cree Nation in Saskatchewan. Prior to working as a full-time artist in 2014 Dumont was employed in Alberta's oil and gas industry. She currently works out of her home

== Career ==
=== Style ===
Dumont's early work was in the realist style. Her more recent painting is primarily in the style of pointillism. Her primary medium is acrylic, but some of her works also include oil and watercolour work. Much of her artistic work draws on her experience as an Indigenous person.

=== Reception ===
In 2018, Dumont was invited to be part of an Indigenous Tourism Association of Canada event to be held at the Canadian embassy in Germany. As part of this invitation Dumont painted live in front of an audience at the embassy.

== Work ==
=== Exhibited Work ===
- "Waiting For Grant Entry", Imago Mundi: Great and North Canadian Exhibit, Palazzo Lorendan (Venice, Italy), 2017.

=== Awards and nominations ===
In 2017, Dumont won the Didsbury Business of the Year award. In the same year she also received a grant from the Indigenous Tourism Association to support her artistic work. In 2017, Dumont's business also won bronze in the Mountain View Gazette's Readers' Choice Award.
