= Nicolas Dumont =

Nicolas Dumont may refer to:

- Nicolas Dumont (water polo) (born 1940), Belgian water polo player
- Nicolas Dumont (cyclist) (1973–2025), French road cyclist
- Nicolas Dumont (field hockey) (born 1991), French field hockey player
- Nick Dumont (born 1994), known professionally as Emma Dumont, American actor, model, and dancer
