= François Dumont (sculptor) =

French sculptor

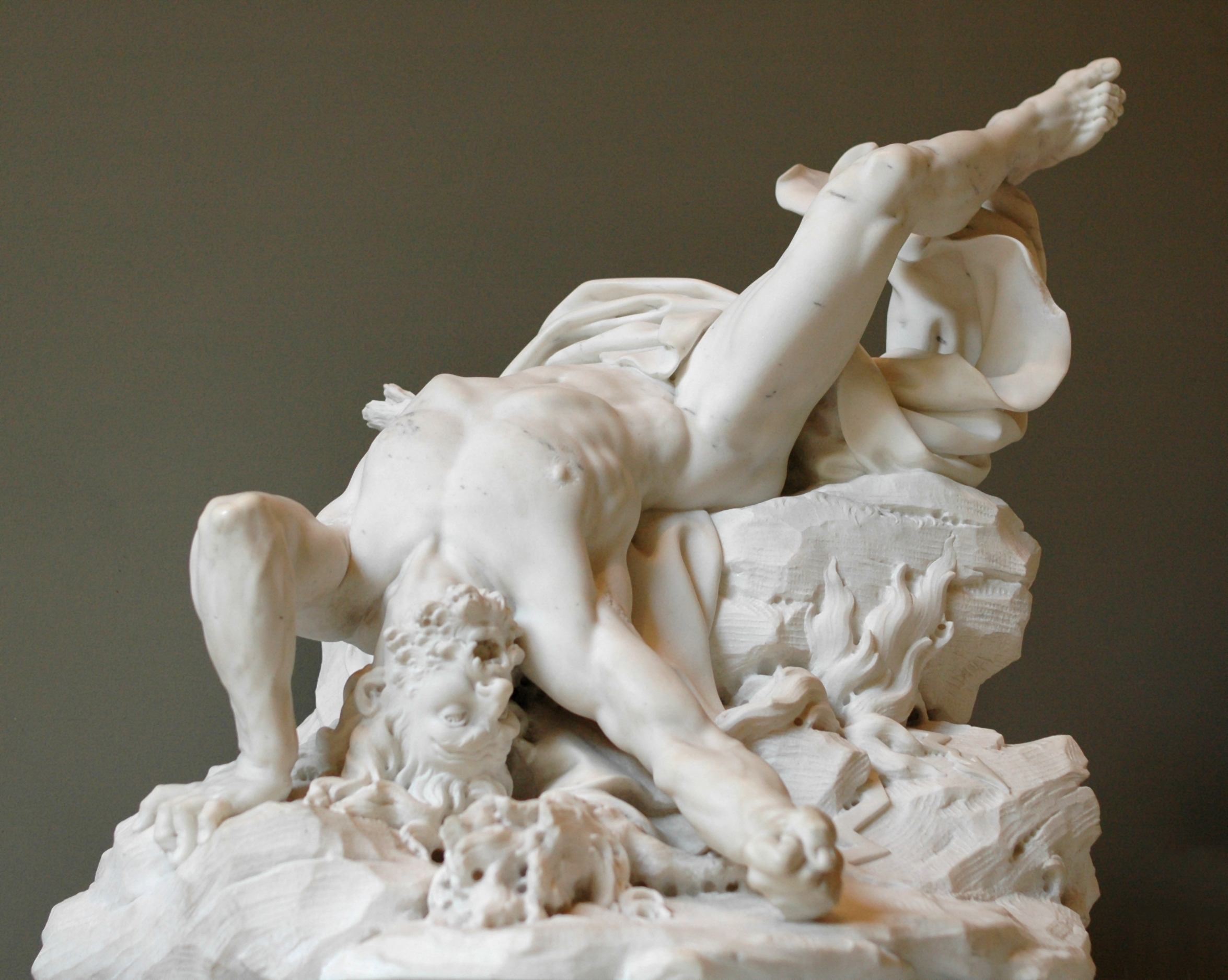
Titan struck by lightning by François Dumont, reception piece for the Académie royale de peinture et de sculpture, The Louvre, 1712

François Dumont (French pronunciation: [fʁɑ̃swa dymɔ̃]; 1688 – 14 December 1726) was a French sculptor.

== Early life ==
Dumont was the son of the sculptor Pierre Dumont and Marie Mercier. He was a native of the Place Saint-Sulpice in Paris, and the brother of Jacques Dumont le Romain (1704-1781), painter. In 1709 he was awarded the Prix de Rome. Approved the previous year, François Dumont was received on 24 September 1712, at the Académie royale de peinture et de sculpture (Royal Academy of Painting and Sculpture).

== Marriage ==
On November 21, 1712, Dumont married: "In the Church of Saint-Germain l'Auxerrois in the presence of his parents, miss Anne-Françoise Coypel, aged 24 years, daughter of the late Noël Coypel (1628-1707), vivant peintre ordinaire du Roi and Anne Françoise Perrin (ca. 1665-1728). Present, his parents, Philippe Sauvage, secretary of the Marquis de La Chastre, residing rue du Mail, parish St. Eutache, cousin of the groom, Françoise Perrin, mother of the bride, Antoine Coypel, painter to the king, keeps paintings and drawings by Her Majesty, the first painter of the Duc d'Orléans remaining galleries of the Louvre, brother of the bride, Christmas Nicolas Coypel, son of late Noel Coypel remaining street Nettles of this parish, brother mariée that signed".

== Career ==
Dumont's son Edme Dumont, and his grandson Jacques-Edme Dumont also became sculptors. Lambert-Sigisbert Adam was one of his students as well. He executed for the Church of Saint-Sulpice, Paris four statues: St. Peter, St. Paul, St. John and St. Joseph. He was the first sculptor of Leopold, Duke of Lorraine, for which he worked in Nancy, France.
