= Archives de Paris =

Coordinates: 48.8791°N 2.4067°E

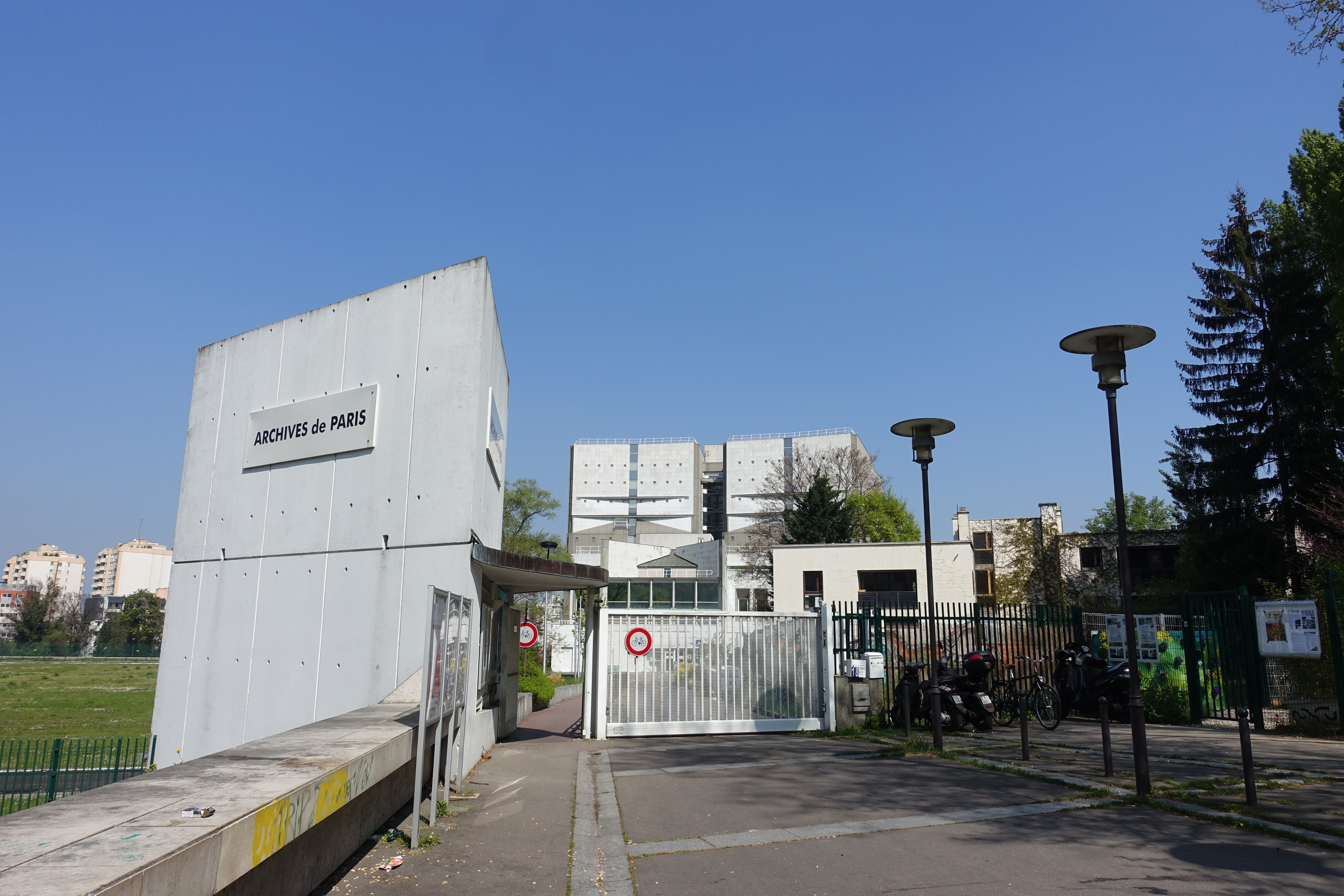
The Archives in 2017.

The Archives de Paris is the archive service for the city of Paris, based at 18 boulevard Sérurier, at the end of Allée Marius Barroux (named after the Archives' first director), in the 19th arrondissement of Paris, near Porte des Lilas station. It also has an annexe (closed to the public) in Villemoisson-sur-Orge.

Part of Paris's archives disappeared in the fires during the Paris Commune in May 1871, notably most of the parish registers and civil registration registers from the 16th century to 1860. After the Hôtel de Saint-Aignan was renovated in 1978, the archives de Paris moved in there, leaving for their present location at the end of the 1990s.

== Holdings ==
- Civil marriage records for Paris from 1860 to 1902, and beyond
- Alphabetical index of the first reconstruction of civil records prior to 1860
- Population censuses (1926, 1931, 1936, and 1946)
- Tables of personal records and military service records (1875–1930)
- Admission registers of children in care (1742–1917)
- Orders for the restitution of property looted during the Second World War (1945–1976)
- 19th century cadastre maps of Paris
- Photographic collections (1860–1940)

== Directors ==
- 1886–1928: Marius Barroux
- 1941–1958: François de Vaux de Foletier
- 1958–1966: Yves Pérotin
- 1990–1995: Jean-Marie Jenn
- 1996–2003: François Gasnault
- 2005–2015: Agnès Masson
- 2015–2023: Guillaume Nahon
- 2023–present: Béatrice Hérold

== See also ==
- Parish and Civil Registers in Paris

== Bibliography (in French) ==
- Sur les traces de vos ancêtres à Paris, 2007.
- Trier Gabriele Lingelbach, « L'histoire de la science historique française à travers les archives parisiennes : guide de recherche », in Francia, n° 28/3, 2001.
