= Mariken Dumon =

Belgian glass artist

Mariken Dumon (born 1983) is a Belgian glass artist. Her work is held in the permanent collection of Corning Museum of Glass.

== Biography ==
Dumon studied visual arts and completed a master's degree at Sint-Lucas Visual Arts in Ghent, Belgium. She studied glassblowing at Kosta Glass School in Sweden and has been an artist in residence at Corning Museum of Glass in the United States.
