= Piano Quintet No. 2 (Farrenc) =

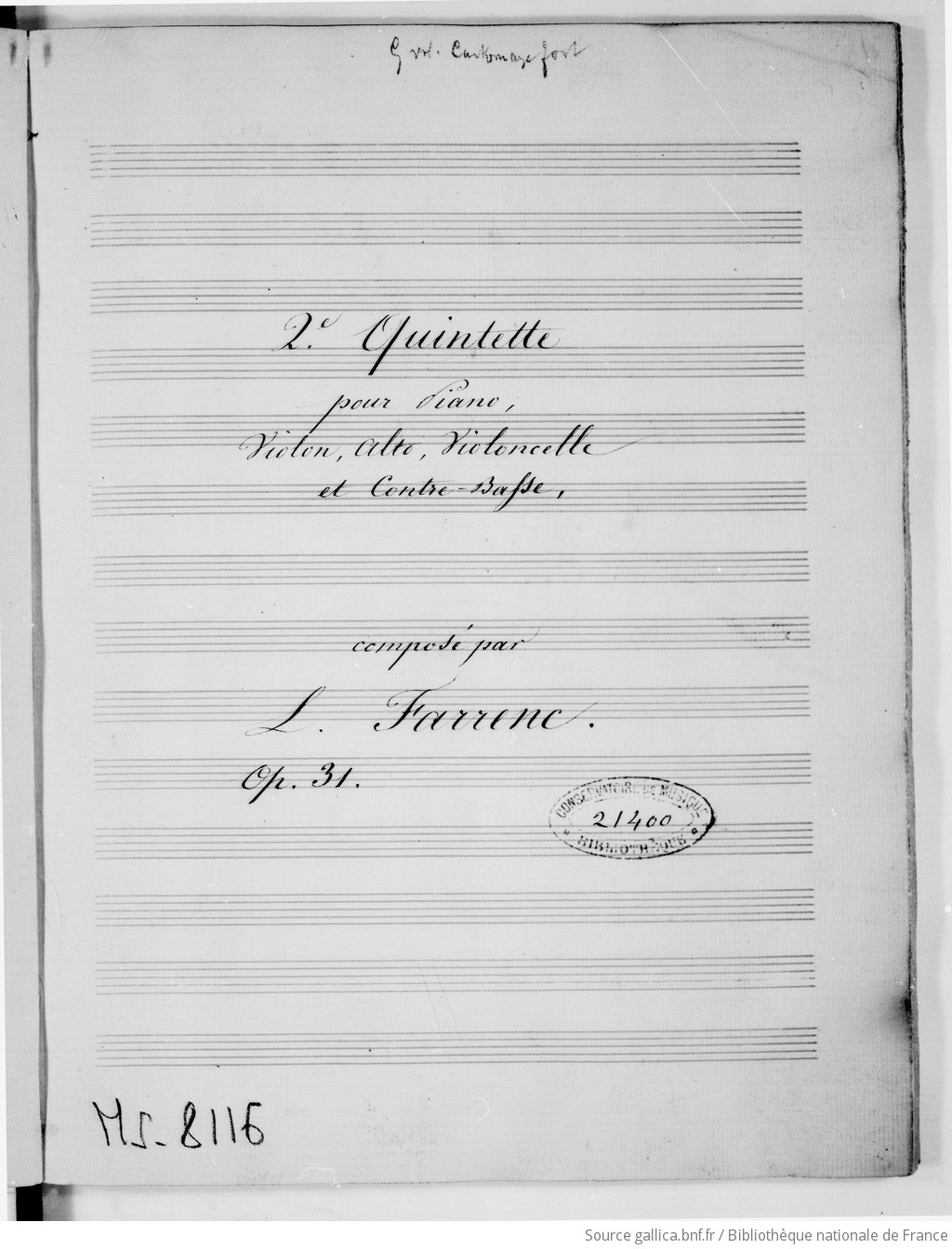
Quintet No. 2 for piano, violin, viola, cello and double bass by Louise Farrenc, title page of the autograph manuscript

The Piano Quintet No. 2 in E major, Op. 31, was composed by the French composer Louise Farrenc in 1840. The quintet is scored for piano, violin, viola, cello, and double bass.

This piece follows the standard four-movement form:

1. Andante sostenuto – Allegro grazioso (in E major and in sonata form)
2. Grave (in A major and in sonata rondo form)
3. Scherzo (Vivace) (in C♯ minor and in ternary form, with a "trio" section in D♭ major)
4. Finale (Allegro) (in E major and in sonata form) (Unusually, the second subject in the exposition is in A♭ major)

== See also ==
Piano Quintet No. 1 (Farrenc)
