= Éric Dumont-Baltet =

Éric Dumont is a French horticulturalist and nursery gardener in Troyes in the French département Aube. He is the son of the pilot Charles Dumont and great-grandson of the famous horticulturist Charles Baltet.

He is considered an orchard specialist as he has conserved various old fruit-bearing varieties and the centuries-old knowledge of caring for them. He presents numerous gardening and orchard television programmes with the French actor, author and presenter Jean-Pierre Coffe. In 2000 he published a book entitled Les Vergers à l'ancienne (The Orchards of Old).
