= Louise Farrenc =

French composer and pianist (1804–1875)

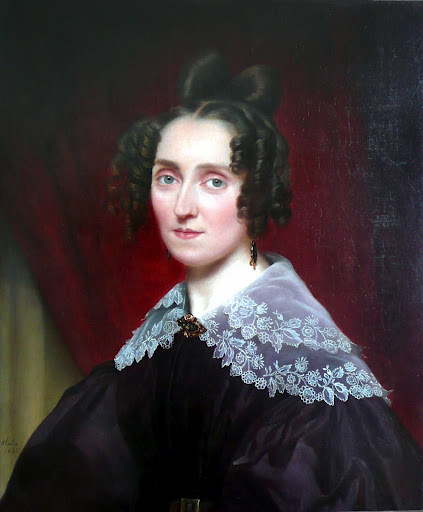
Farrenc portrait (1835) by Luigi Rubio

Louise Farrenc (née Jeanne-Louise Dumont; 31 May 1804 – 15 September 1875) was a French composer, virtuoso pianist and teacher of the Romantic period. Her compositions include three symphonies, a few choral works, numerous chamber pieces and a wide variety of piano music.

== Life and career ==
Born Jeanne-Louise Dumont in Paris, she was the daughter of Jacques-Edme Dumont and sister to Auguste Dumont. Her father was in the fourth generation of a master craftsman dynasty employed by the French Royalty; her brother Auguste was in the fifth and final generation of this chain. Growing up, she lived in an apartment connected to the historic Sorbonne University, where many artist families were housed by the French government. She began piano studies at an early age with Cecile Soria, a former student of Muzio Clementi. When it became clear that she had the ability to become a professional pianist she was given lessons by such masters as Ignaz Moscheles and Johann Nepomuk Hummel, and, given the talent she showed as a composer, her parents decided to let her, in 1818 at the age of fifteen, study composition with Anton Reicha, a professor of counterpoint and fugue at the Conservatoire de Paris. However, she was taught through private lessons as women were forbidden to enroll in the traditional composition classes at that time. In 1821 she married Aristide Farrenc, a flute student ten years her senior, who performed at some of the concerts regularly given at the artists' colony of the Sorbonne, where Louise's family lived. Following her marriage, Farrenc interrupted her studies to give concerts throughout France with her husband. He, however, soon grew tired of the concert life and, with her help, opened a publishing house in Paris, which, as Éditions Farrenc, became one of France's leading music publishers for nearly 40 years.

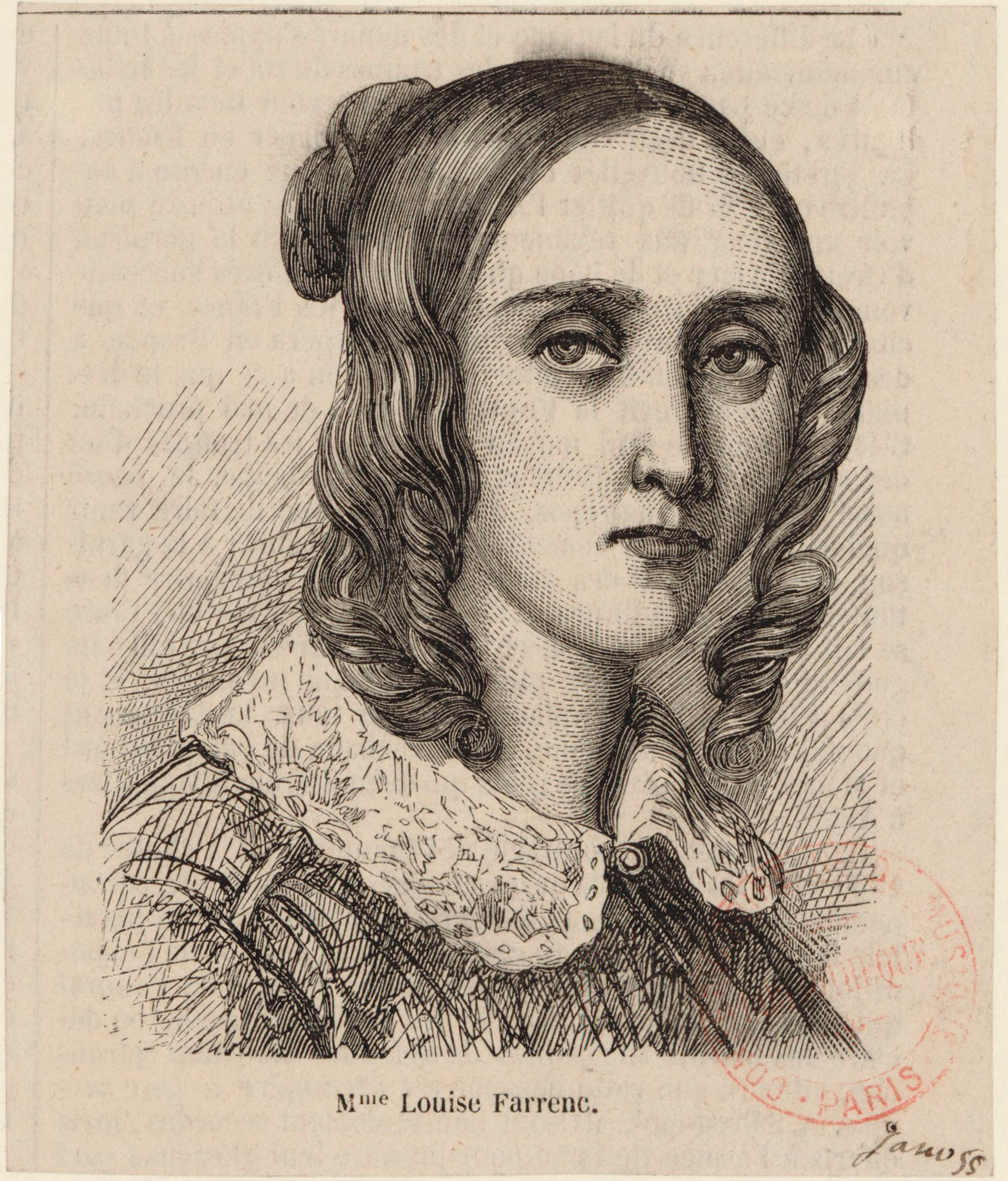
Farrenc in a c. 1855 portrait

In Paris, Farrenc returned to her studies with Reicha in 1825, after which she re-embarked on a concert career, briefly interrupted in 1826 when she gave birth to a daughter, Victorine, who also became a concert pianist but who died in 1859 aged thirty-two. In the 1830s, Farrenc gained considerable fame as a performer and her reputation was such that in 1842 she was appointed to the permanent position of Professor of Piano at the Paris Conservatory, a position she held for thirty years and one which was among the most prestigious in Europe. Farrenc was the only woman to hold the esteemed position and rank at the Paris Conservatory throughout the 19th century. Accounts of the time record that she was an excellent instructor, with many of her students graduating with first prizes and becoming professional musicians. Despite this, Farrenc was paid less than her male counterparts for nearly a decade. Only after the triumphant premiere of her nonet, at which the famous violinist Joseph Joachim took part, did she demand and receive equal pay. Besides her teaching and performing career, she also produced and edited an influential book, Le Trésor des pianistes, about early music performance style, and was twice awarded the Prix Chartier of the Académie des Beaux-Arts, in 1861 and 1869.

Farrenc lived until 15 September 1875, when she died in Paris.

== Music ==
During the 1820s and 1830s she composed largely for the piano. Several of these pieces drew high praise from critics, including Robert Schumann. In the 1830s, she tried her hand at larger compositions for both chamber ensemble and orchestra. It was during the 1840s that much of her chamber music was written. While the great bulk of Farrenc's compositions were for the piano alone, her chamber music is generally regarded as her best work.

Throughout her life, chamber music remained of great interest. She wrote works for various combinations of winds and or strings and piano. These include two piano quintets, Opp. 30 and 31; a sextet for piano and winds, Op. 40, which later appeared in an arrangement for piano quintet; two piano trios, Opp. 33 and 34; the nonet for winds and strings, Op. 38; a trio for clarinet (or violin), cello, and piano, Op. 44; a trio for flute (or violin), cello, and piano, Op. 45; and several instrumental sonatas (a string quartet sometimes attributed to her is regarded by specialists as the work of another composer, not yet identified).

In addition to chamber music and works for solo piano, she wrote two overtures and three symphonies. Inspired by the symphonic works of Haydn, Mozart, and Beethoven, Farrenc's three symphonies are quite conventional. Her first movements follow traditional sonata form, accompanied by slow, lyrical second movements. Staying true to the form, Farrenc wrote third movements of minuets or scherzos, finishing with fourth movements that showcased Farrenc's skill at writing invertible counterpoint and freely expressive fugues.

Her third symphony, Op. 36, was performed at the Société des concerts du Conservatoire in 1849. Missing from her output is opera, a notable gap given the stature of opera as a musical form in France at the time. Sources indicate that she had ambitions to compose opera, but did not succeed in being given a libretto to set to music by the Théâtre de l'Opéra or the Théâtre de l'Opéra-Comique.

As well as composing, Farrenc was also working as a performer during this time, specializing in the music of Beethoven and Mozart. She later championed the works of the French clavecinistes and English virginalists, performing the modern concert premieres of many pieces by these composers, which were met with poor reception.

== Legacy ==
Much of her music was well received. Maurice Borges, in an 1847 issue of La Beuyere, claims she wrote "symphonies a great many of male composers would have been proud to have written." However, François-Joseph Fétis, a leading Belgian 19th-century music biographer and critic, wrote in the 2nd edition of his Biographie universelle des musiciens (1862):

Unfortunately, the genre of large scale instrumental music to which Madame Farrenc, by nature and formation, felt herself called involves performance resources which a composer can acquire for herself or himself only with enormous effort. Another factor here is the public, as a rule not a very knowledgeable one, whose only standard for measuring the quality of a work is the name of its author. If the composer is unknown, the audience remains unreceptive, and the publishers, especially in France, close their ears anyway when someone offers them a halfway decent work; they believe in success only for trinkets. Such were the obstacles that Madame Farrenc met along the way and which caused her to despair.

For several decades after Farrenc's death, her reputation as a performer survived and her name continued to appear in such books as Antoine François Marmontel's Pianistes célèbres. Her nonet had achieved some popularity, as did her two piano quintets and her trios. But, despite some new editions of her chamber music after her death, her works were largely forgotten until, in the late 20th century, an interest in women composers led to the rediscovery – and thence to the performance and recording – of many of her works. In December 2013, Farrenc was the subject of the long-running BBC Radio 3 programme Composer of the Week.

== List of compositions ==
Farrenc wrote exclusively for the piano from 1820 to 1830, expanding her range to include works for orchestra beginning in 1834. Her work includes 49 compositions with opus numbers.

=== Orchestral works ===
- Symphony No. 1 in C minor, Op. 32 (1842)
- Symphony No. 2 in D major, Op. 35 (1845)
- Symphony No. 3 in G minor, Op. 36 (1847)
- Overture in E minor, Op. 23 (1834)
- Overture in E♭, Op. 24 (1834)
- Grand variations on the song "Le premier pas", for piano and orchestra, Op. 4
- Grand variations on a theme by Count Gallenberg, for piano and orchestra, Op. 25

=== Vocal works ===
- Andréa la censurado, ballade
- Je me taisais, romance
- La tourterelle, romance
- La madone
- Le berger fidèle, romance
- Le prisonnier de guerre, dramatic scene
- Le suicide, scène et air (music same as Le prisonnier de guerre)
- Toi que j'appelle

=== Choral works ===
- O père qu'adore mon père (hymn by Lamartine), (unaccompanied choir)
- O père qu'adore mon père (hymn by Lamartine), (choir and piano)
- O salutaris hostia, (soprano, alto and tenor)

=== Chamber music ===
- Grand Variations on the song Le premier pas, Op. 4
- Concertante Variations on a Swiss tune, Op. 20 (piano and violin)
- Piano Quintet No. 1 in A minor, Op. 30 (1839; piano, violin, viola, cello and double bass)
- Piano Quintet No. 2 in E, Op. 31 (1840; piano, violin, viola, cello and double bass)
- Trio in E♭, Op. 33 (1841–44; piano, violin and cello)
- Trio in D, Op. 34 (1844; piano, violin and cello)
- Sonata for violin and piano in C minor, Op. 37 (1848)
- Nonet in E♭, Op. 38 (1849; string quartet and wind quintet)
- Sonata for violin and piano in A, Op. 39 (1850)
- Sextet in C minor, Op. 40 (1852; piano, flute, oboe, clarinet, bassoon and horn)
- Trio in E♭, Op. 44 (1854–56; piano, clarinet and cello)
- Trio in E minor, Op. 45 (1854–56; piano, flute and cello)
- Sonata for cello and piano in B♭, Op. 46 (1857)
- String Quartet in Bb Major

=== Piano works ===
- Variations (Aristide Farrenc), Op. 2
- Grandes variations Le premier pas, Op. 4 (piano solo)
- Variations brillantes on a theme from La Cenerentola by Rossini, Op. 5
- Variations sur l'air favori "O ma tendre musette!", Op. 6
- Air suisse varié, Op. 7
- Trois rondeaux, Op. 8
- Rondeau sur un air du pirate de Bellini, Op. 9
- Variations (George Onslow), Op. 10
- Rondeau sur des thèmes d'Euryanthe by Carl Maria von Weber, Op. 11
- Variations (Galopade favorite), Op. 12
- Rondeau (Rossini), Op. 13
- Les italiennes, Op. 14
- Variations brillantes (Donizetti), Op. 15
- Les allemandes, Op. 16
- Air russe varié, Op. 17
- La Sylphide, Op. 18
- Souvenir des Huguenots, Op. 19
- Les jours heureux, Op. 21
- Fugues, Op. 22
- Trente études in all the major and minor keys, Op. 26 (1838)
- Hymne russe varié, Op. 27
- Variations sur un thème allemand, Op. 28
- Variations (Bellini) Op. 29 (Piano four hands, arrangements for two or three pianos)
- Douze études brillantes, Op. 41 (1853)
- Vingt études de moyenne difficulté, Op. 42 (1854)
- Trois mélodies, Op. 43
- Scherzo, Op. 47
- Valse brillante, Op. 48
- 1er nocturne, Op. 49
- Vingt cinq études faciles, Op. 50
- Deuxième valse brillante, Op. 51
- Various works for piano, without opus numbers
- La Grand'mére, Rondoletto No. 1 (1835)
- Naples, Rondoletto No. 2 (1835)
- Venez dans la prairie, Rondoletto No. 3
- Mélodie, without opus number
