= Jean Dumont (historian) =

French historian and publisher

Jean Dumont (10 October 1923, in Lyon – July 2001) was a French historian and publisher.

== Career overview ==
Dumont graduated in history and philosophy at the University of Lyon and in law in Paris. His specialty was Church history; he also studied Spanish social and religious history of the 15th and 16th centuries. He worked as editor for several publishing companies such as Amiot-Dumont (1947 – 1959), Grasset, François Beauval, Club des Amis du Livre and Famot.

== Works ==
- Erreurs sur le "Mal Français", ou le trompe-l'oeil de M. Peyrefitte (1979).
- Proces Contradictoire de l'Inquisition Espagnole (1983).
- L'Église au Risque de l'Histoire (1984; rep. in 2002 with a preface by Pierre Chaunu).
- La Révolution Française ou Les Prodiges du Sacrilège (1984).
- Pourquoi nous ne Célèbrerons pas 1789 (1987).
- Petit Voyage en Théomarxie: Bref Examen Critique de "Théo", la "Nouvelle Encyclopédie Catholique" (1990).
- L'Heure de Dieu sur le Nouveau Monde (1991).
- L'Incomparable Isabelle la Catholique (1992).
- La Vraie Controverse de Valladolid (1995).
- Lepante, l'Histoire Étouffée (1997).

=== Miscellany ===
- Les Coups d'Etats (1963).
- Une Croix sur le Nouveau Monde (1992).
- "Les Causes de la Persécution Religieuse." In: L’Envers des Droits de l’Homme (1993).
- "Aux Origines de la Laïcité, les Zones d'Ombre de l'Histoire de France." In: Qui a Peur du Baptême de Clovis? (1997).
- La Croix et le Croissant (2001).
- Repentance Pourquoi Nous Ne Demandons Pas Pardon (2003).
