= Jean Dumont (politician) =

French politician (1930–2021)

Senator from Deux-Sèvres
- In office 28 September 1986 – 1 October 1995

Mayor of Thouars
- In office 1977–1989
- Preceded by: Raymond Vouhé
- Succeeded by: Serge Moulin

Personal details
- Born: 27 November 1930 Thouars, France
- Died: 18 January 2021 (aged 90) Parthenay, France
- Party: PR

Jean Dumont (27 November 1930 – 18 January 2021) was a French politician. Prior to his political career, he worked as a veterinarian. In the Senate, he served on the Committee of Social Affairs.

Dumont's son, Alain, served as a municipal councillor for Thouars.
