= André Dumont (cyclist) =

French cyclist

Personal information
- Born: 4 May 1903
- Died: 16 August 1994 (aged 91)

Cycling career
- Sport: Cycling
- Discipline: Road
- Role: Rider

André Dumont (4 May 1903 – 16 August 1994) was a French racing cyclist. He rode in the 1928 Tour de France.
