= Aristide Farrenc =

French music publisher and musicologist

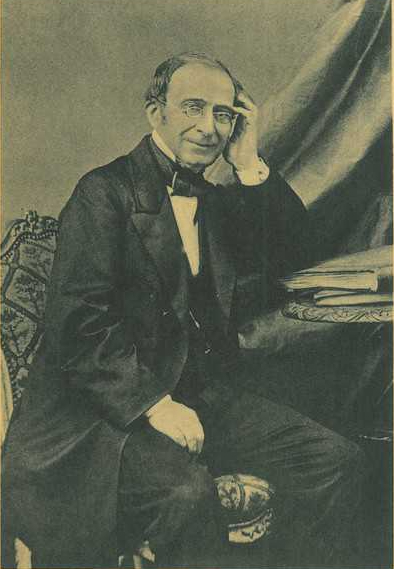
- Born: Jacques Hippolyte Aristide Farrenc; 9 April 1794; Marseille, France
- Died: 31 January 1865 (aged 70); Paris
- Occupations: Music publisher; musicologist; flautist

Jacques Hippolyte Aristide Farrenc (9 April 1794 – 31 January 1865) was a French music publisher, musicologist and flautist.

== Biography ==
Aristide Farrenc worked as a flautist at the Théâtre italien and founded the Éditions Farrenc, a music publishing company which he left in 1841 to devote himself to musicology.

In collaboration with his wife Louise Farrenc, he published the Trésor des pianistes in 20 issues (1861–1872), containing many works of early music for harpsichord (Couperin, Bach, Haendel, Scarlatti, Rameau, etc.), and sonatas for pianoforte such as those by CPE Bach, Haydn, Mozart, Clementi, Hummel, Dussek, Weber, Beethoven, and Chopin. Eight of these issues were their joint work; the remainder were published by Louise after her husband's death.* Allen, David (8 October 2021). "Louise Farrenc, 19th-Century Composer, Surges Back Into Sound". The New York Times.

His wife Louise Farrenc was a virtuoso pianist, esteemed teacher and composer. After his death in 1865 she continued to publish the Trésor des pianistes until the 20th and last volume in 1872. Three additional volumes also appeared, but containing the music already published of the first half of the nineteenth century (Hummel, Ries, Weber, Mendelssohn and Chopin).

== Works ==
- Les Concerts historiques de M. Fétis à Paris, Paris, 1855.
- Le Trésor des pianistes, Paris, 1861; New York, 1977.
