= Pierre Dumont (sculptor) =

French sculptor

Pierre Dumont (c. 1650 – ?) was a French sculptor.

The brother-in-law of Antoine Coypel, in 1709 he won first prize in sculpture for David pardonnant à Abigaïl. His son François Dumont (1688–1726) was also a sculptor.
