= Chamber music =

Form of classical music composed for a small group of instruments

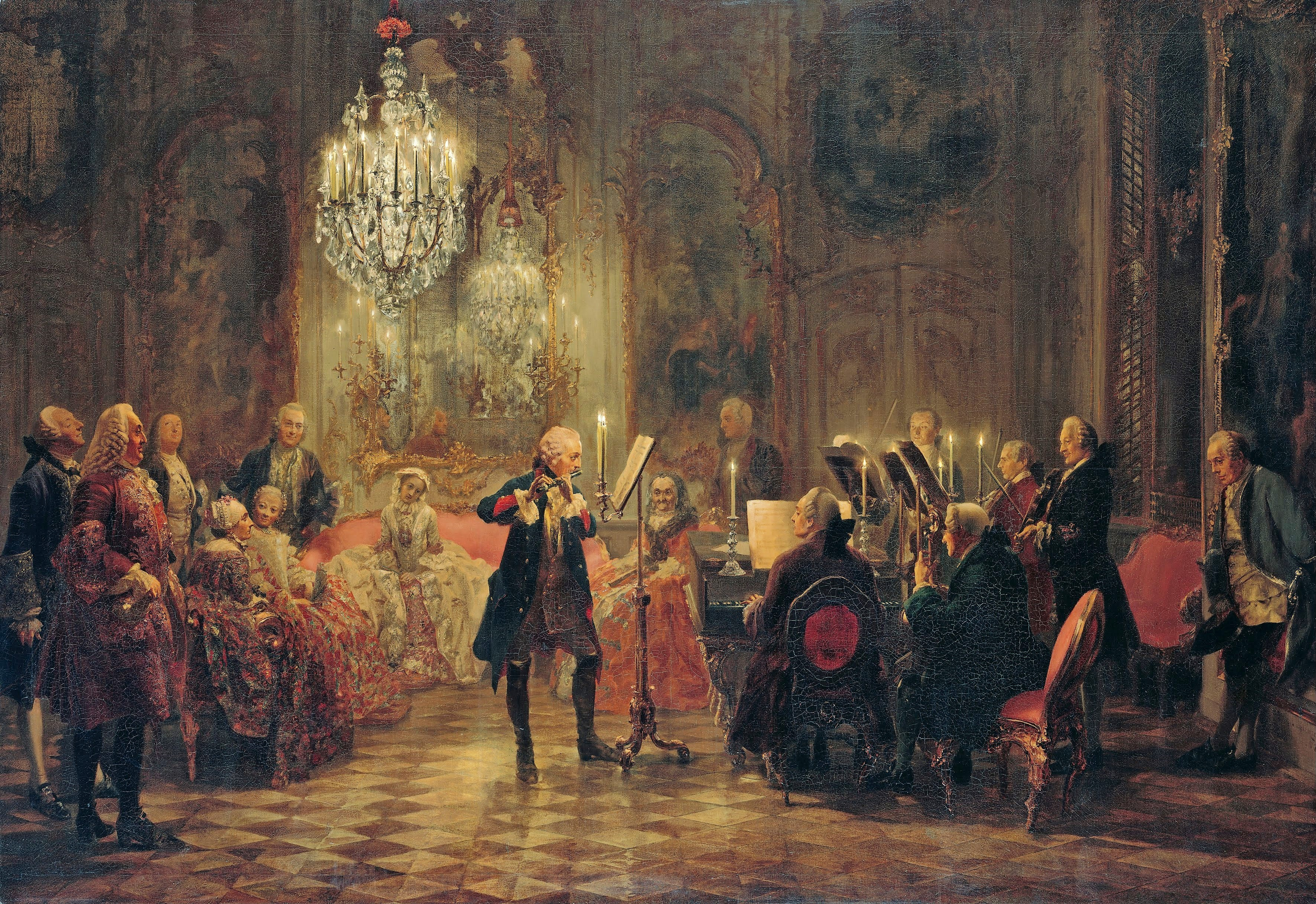
Frederick the Great plays flute in his summer palace Sanssouci, with Franz Benda playing violin, Carl Philipp Emanuel Bach accompanying on keyboard, and unidentified string players; painting by Adolph Menzel (1850–52)

Chamber music is a form of classical music that is composed for a small group of instruments—traditionally a group that could fit in a palace chamber or a large room. Most broadly, it includes any art music that is performed by a small number of performers, with one performer to a part (in contrast to orchestral music, in which each string part is played by a number of performers). However, by convention, it usually does not include solo instrument performances.

Because of its intimate nature, chamber music has been described as "the music of friends". For more than 100 years, chamber music was played primarily by amateur musicians in their homes, and even today, when chamber music performance has migrated from the home to the concert hall, many musicians, amateur and professional, still play chamber music for their own pleasure. Playing chamber music requires special skills, both musical and social, that differ from the skills required for playing solo or symphonic works.

Johann Wolfgang von Goethe described chamber music (specifically, string quartet music) as "four rational people conversing". This conversational paradigm – which refers to the way one instrument introduces a melody or motif and then other instruments subsequently "respond" with a similar motif – has been a thread woven through the history of chamber music composition from the end of the 18th century to the present. The analogy to conversation recurs in descriptions and analyses of chamber music compositions.

== History ==
From its earliest beginnings in the Medieval period to the present, chamber music has been a reflection of the changes in the technology and the society that produced it.

=== Early beginnings ===
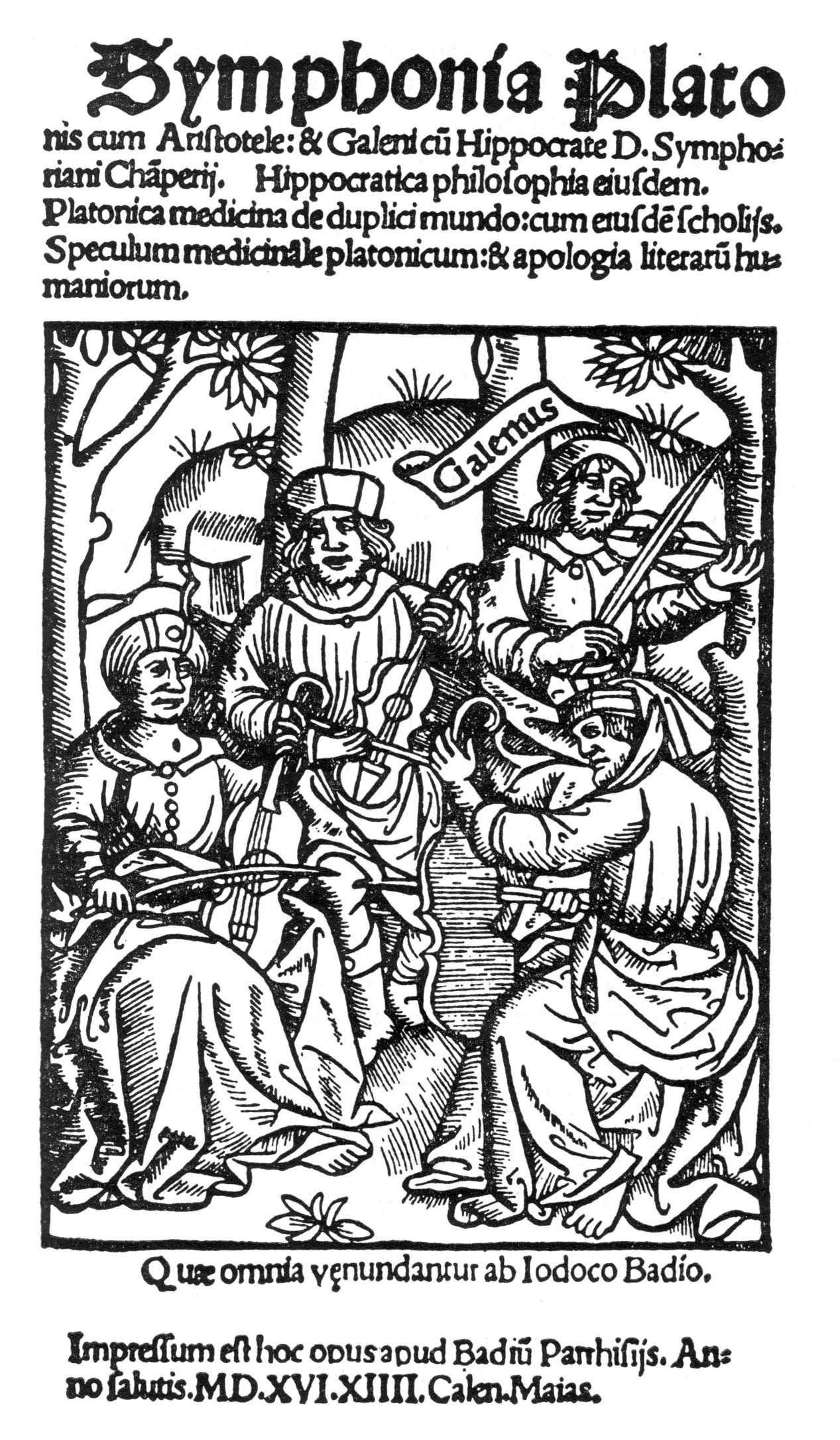
Plato, Aristotle, Hippocrates and Galen play a piece on viols in this fanciful woodcut from 1516.

During the Middle Ages and the early Renaissance, instruments were used primarily as accompaniment for singers. String players would play along with the melody line sung by the singer. There were also purely instrumental ensembles, often of stringed precursors of the violin family, called consorts.

Some analysts consider the origin of classical instrumental ensembles to be the sonata da camera (chamber sonata) and the sonata da chiesa (church sonata). These were compositions for one to five or more instruments. The sonata da camera was a suite of slow and fast movements, interspersed with dance tunes; the sonata da chiesa was the same, but the dances were omitted. These forms gradually developed into the trio sonata of the Baroque – two treble instruments and a bass instrument, often with a keyboard or other chording instrument (harpsichord, organ, harp or lute, for example) filling in the harmony. Both the bass instrument and the chordal instrument would play the basso continuo part.

During the Baroque period, chamber music as a genre was not clearly defined. Often, works could be played on any variety of instruments, in orchestral or chamber ensembles. The Art of Fugue by Johann Sebastian Bach, for example, can be played on a keyboard instrument (harpsichord or organ) or by a string quartet or a string orchestra. The instrumentation of trio sonatas was also often flexibly specified; some of Handel's sonatas are scored for "German flute, Hoboy [oboe] or Violin" Bass lines could be played by violone, cello, theorbo, or bassoon, and sometimes three or four instruments would join in the bass line in unison. Sometimes composers mixed movements for chamber ensembles with orchestral movements. Telemann's 'Tafelmusik' (1733), for example, has five sets of movements for various combinations of instruments, ending with a full orchestral section.

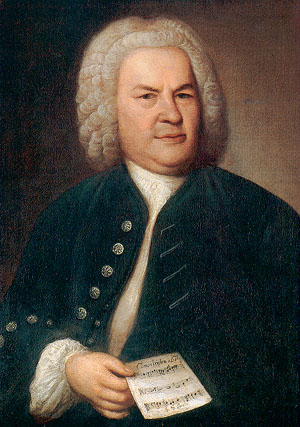

J. S. Bach: Trio sonata on YouTube from The Musical Offering, played by Ensemble Brillante

Baroque chamber music was often contrapuntal; that is, each instrument played the same melodic materials at different times, creating a complex, interwoven fabric of sound. Because each instrument was playing essentially the same melodies, all the instruments were equal. In the trio sonata, there is often no ascendent or solo instrument, but all three instruments share equal importance.

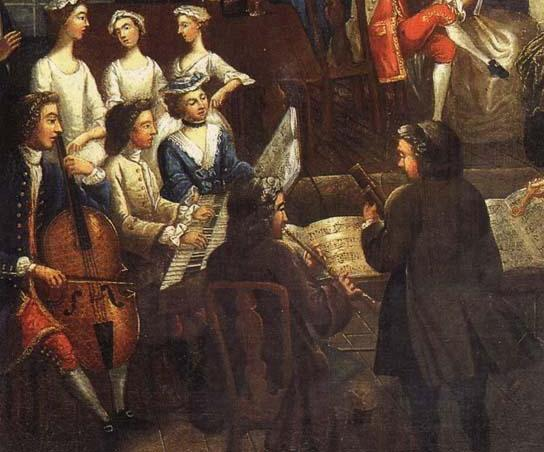
Baroque musicians playing a trio sonata, 18th-century anonymous painting

The harmonic role played by the keyboard or other chording instrument was subsidiary, and usually the keyboard part was not even written out; rather, the chordal structure of the piece was specified by numeric codes over the bass line, called figured bass.

In the second half of the 18th century, tastes began to change: many composers preferred a new, lighter Galant style, with "thinner texture, ... and clearly defined melody and bass" to the complexities of counterpoint. Now a new custom arose that gave birth to a new form of chamber music: the serenade. Patrons invited street musicians to play evening concerts below the balconies of their homes, their friends and their lovers. Patrons and musicians commissioned composers to write suitable suites of dances and tunes, for groups of two to five or six players. These works were called serenades, nocturnes, divertimenti, or cassations (from gasse=street). The young Joseph Haydn was commissioned to write several of these.

=== Haydn, Mozart, and the classical style ===
Joseph Haydn is generally credited with creating the modern form of chamber music as we know it, although scholars today such as Roger Hickman argue "the idea that Haydn invented the string quartet and single-handedly advanced the genre is based on only a vague notion of the true history of the eighteenth-century genre." A typical string quartet of the period would consist of

- An opening movement in sonata form, usually with two contrasting themes, followed by a development section where the thematic material is transformed and transposed, and ending with a recapitulation of the initial two themes.
- A lyrical movement in a slow or moderate tempo, sometimes built out of three sections that repeat themselves in the order A–B–C–A–B–C, and sometimes a set of variations.
- A minuet or scherzo, a light movement in three quarter time, with a main section, a contrasting trio section, and a repeat of the main section.
- A fast finale section in rondo form, a series of contrasting sections with a main refrain section opening and closing the movement, and repeating between each section.

Haydn was by no means the only composer developing new modes of chamber music. Even before Haydn, many composers were already experimenting with new forms. Giovanni Battista Sammartini, Ignaz Holzbauer, and Franz Xaver Richter wrote precursors of the string quartet. Franz Ignaz von Beecke (1733-1803), with his Piano Quintet in A minor (1770) and 17 string quartets was also one of the pioneers of chamber music of the Classical period.

Another renowned composer of chamber music of the period was Wolfgang Amadeus Mozart. Mozart's seven piano trios and two piano quartets were the first to apply the conversational principle to chamber music with piano. Haydn's piano trios are essentially piano sonatas with the violin and cello playing mostly supporting roles, doubling the treble and bass lines of the piano score. But Mozart gives the strings an independent role, using them as a counter to the piano, and adding their individual voices to the chamber music conversation.

Wolfgang Amadeus Mozart: String Quintet No. 4, K. 516
First movement
played by Roxana Pavel Goldstein, Elizabeth Choi, violins; Elias Goldstein, Sally Chisholm, violas; Jocelyn Butler, cello.

Mozart introduced the newly invented clarinet into the chamber music arsenal, with the Kegelstatt Trio for viola, clarinet and piano, K. 498, and the Quintet for Clarinet and String Quartet, K. 581. He also tried other innovative ensembles, including the quintet for violin, two violas, cello, and horn, K. 407, quartets for flute and strings, and various wind instrument combinations. He wrote six string quintets for two violins, two violas and cello, which explore the rich tenor tones of the violas, adding a new dimension to the string quartet conversation.

Mozart's string quartets are considered the pinnacle of the classical art. The six string quartets that he dedicated to Haydn, his friend and mentor, inspired the elder composer to say to Mozart's father, "I tell you before God as an honest man that your son is the greatest composer known to me either in person or by reputation. He has taste, and, what is more, the most profound knowledge of composition."

Many other composers wrote chamber compositions during this period that were popular at the time and are still played today. Luigi Boccherini, Italian composer and cellist, wrote nearly a hundred string quartets, and more than one hundred quintets for two violins, viola and two cellos. In this innovative ensemble, later used by Schubert, Boccherini gives flashy, virtuosic solos to the principal cello, as a showcase for his own playing. Violinist Carl Ditters von Dittersdorf and cellist Johann Baptist Wanhal, who both played pickup quartets with Haydn on second violin and Mozart on viola, were popular chamber music composers of the period.

=== From home to hall ===
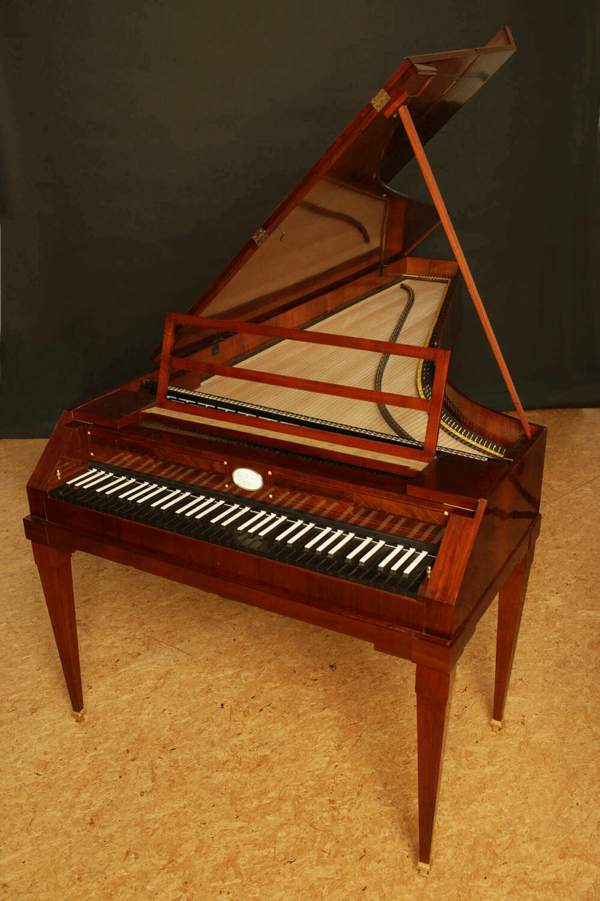
Copy of a pianoforte from 1805

The turn of the 19th century saw dramatic changes in society and in music technology which had far-reaching effects on the way chamber music was composed and played.

==== Collapse of the aristocratic system ====
Throughout the 18th century, the composer was normally an employee of an aristocrat, and the chamber music he or she composed was for the pleasure of aristocratic players and listeners. Haydn, for example, was an employee of Nikolaus I, Prince Esterházy, a music lover and amateur baryton player, for whom Haydn wrote many of his string trios. Mozart wrote three string quartets for the King of Prussia, Frederick William II, a cellist. Many of Beethoven's quartets were first performed with patron Count Andrey Razumovsky on second violin. Boccherini composed for the king of Spain.

With the decline of the aristocracy and the rise of new social orders throughout Europe, composers increasingly had to make money by selling their compositions and performing concerts. They often gave subscription concerts, which involved renting a hall and collecting the receipts from the performance. Increasingly, they wrote chamber music not only for rich patrons, but for professional musicians playing for a paying audience.

==== Changes in the structure of stringed instruments ====
At the beginning of the 19th century, luthiers developed new methods of constructing the violin, viola and cello that gave these instruments a richer tone, more volume, and more carrying power. Also at this time, bowmakers made the violin bow longer, with a thicker ribbon of hair under higher tension. This improved projection, and also made possible new bowing techniques. In 1820, Louis Spohr invented the chinrest, which gave violinists more freedom of movement in their left hands, for a more nimble technique. These changes contributed to the effectiveness of public performances in large halls, and expanded the repertoire of techniques available to chamber music composers.

==== Invention of the pianoforte ====
Throughout the Baroque era, the harpsichord was one of the main instruments used in chamber music. The harpsichord used quills to pluck strings, and it had a delicate sound. Due to the design of the harpsichord, the attack or weight with which the performer played the keyboard did not change the volume or tone. Between about 1750 and the late 1700s, the harpsichord gradually fell out of use. By the late 1700s, the pianoforte became more popular as an instrument for performance. Even though the pianoforte was invented by Bartolomeo Cristofori at the beginning of the 1700s, it did not become widely used until the end of that century, when technical improvements in its construction made it a more effective instrument. Unlike the harpsichord, the pianoforte could play soft or loud dynamics and sharp sforzando attacks depending on how hard or soft the performer played the keys. The improved pianoforte was adopted by Mozart and other composers, who began composing chamber ensembles with the piano playing a leading role. The piano was to become more and more dominant through the 19th century, so much so that many composers, such as Franz Liszt and Frédéric Chopin, wrote almost exclusively for solo piano (or solo piano with orchestra).

=== Beethoven ===
Ludwig van Beethoven straddled this period of change as a giant of Western music. Beethoven transformed chamber music, raising it to a new plane, both in terms of content and in terms of the technical demands on performers and audiences. His works, in the words of Maynard Solomon, were "...the models against which nineteenth-century romanticism measured its achievements and failures." His late quartets, in particular, were considered so daunting an accomplishment that many composers after him were afraid to try composing quartets; Johannes Brahms composed and tore up 20 string quartets before he dared publish a work that he felt was worthy of the "giant marching behind".

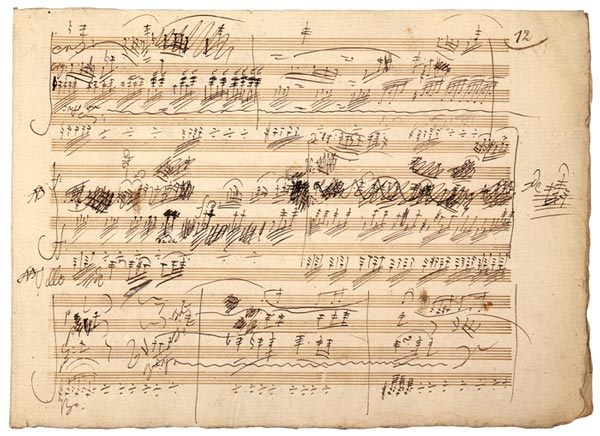
Manuscript of the "Ghost" Trio, Op. 70, No. 1, by Beethoven

Beethoven made his formal debut as a composer with three Piano Trios, Op. 1. Even these early works, written when Beethoven was only 22, while adhering to a strictly classical mold, showed signs of the new paths that Beethoven was to forge in the coming years. When he showed the manuscript of the trios to Haydn, his teacher, prior to publication, Haydn approved of the first two, but warned against publishing the third trio, in C minor, as too radical, warning it would not "...be understood and favorably received by the public."

Haydn was wrong—the third trio was the most popular of the set, and Haydn's criticisms caused a falling-out between him and the sensitive Beethoven. The trio is, indeed, a departure from the mold that Haydn and Mozart had formed. Beethoven makes dramatic deviations of tempo within phrases and within movements. He greatly increases the independence of the strings, especially the cello, allowing it to range above the piano and occasionally even the violin.

If his Op. 1 trios introduced Beethoven's works to the public, his Septet, Op. 20, established him as one of Europe's most popular composers. The septet, scored for violin, viola, cello, contrabass, clarinet, horn, and bassoon, was a huge hit. It was played in concerts again and again. It appeared in transcriptions for many combinations – one of which, for clarinet, cello and piano, was written by Beethoven himself – and was so popular that Beethoven feared it would eclipse his other works. So much so that by 1815, Carl Czerny wrote that Beethoven "could not endure his septet and grew angry because of the universal applause which it has received." The septet is written as a classical divertimento in six movements, including two minuets, and a set of variations. It is full of catchy tunes, with solos for everyone, including the contrabass.

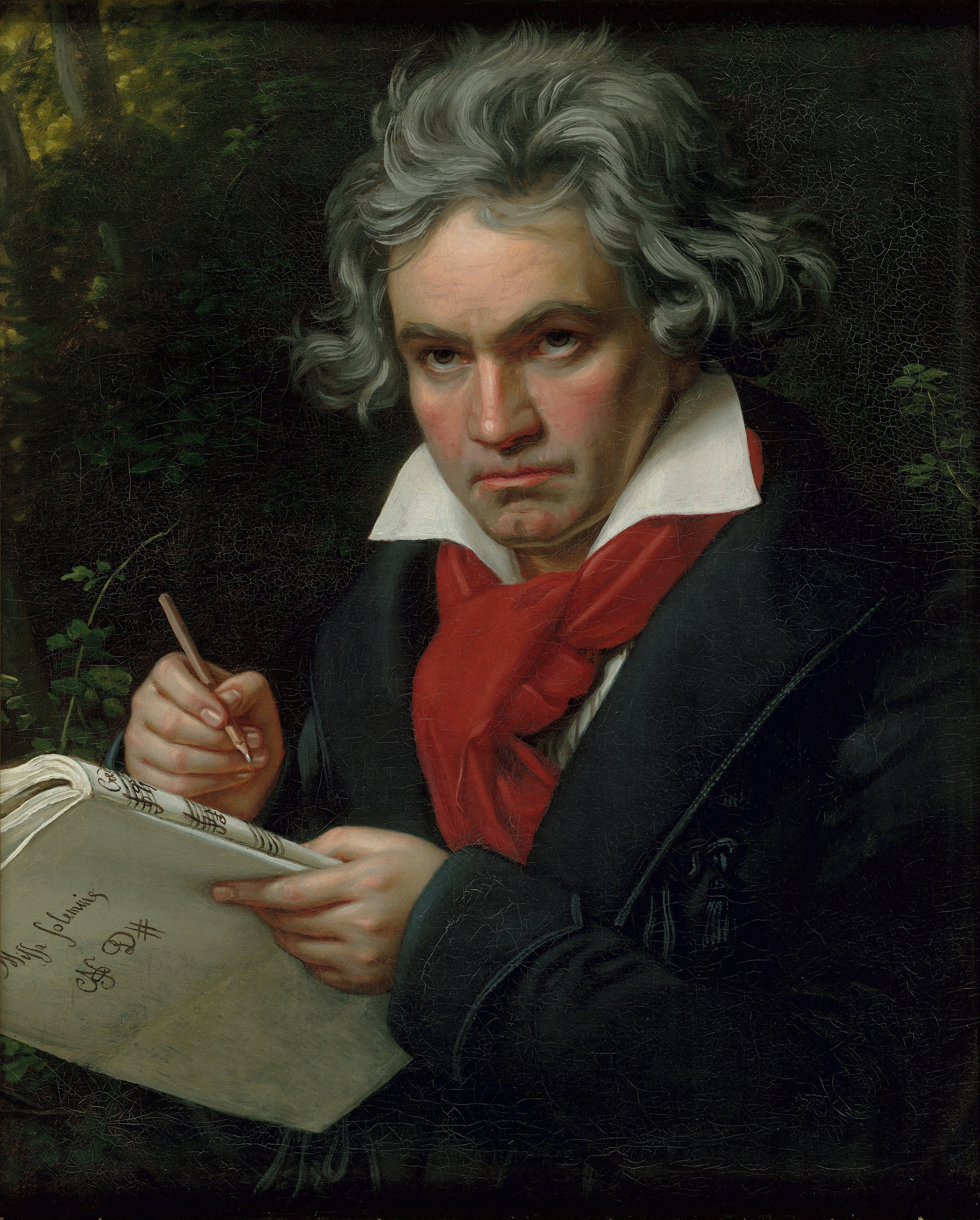

Beethoven: Septet, Op. 20, first movement, played by the Ensemble Mediterrain

In his 17 string quartets, composed over the course of 37 of his 56 years, Beethoven goes from classical composer par excellence to creator of musical Romanticism, and finally, with his late string quartets, he transcends classicism and romanticism to create a genre that defies categorization. Stravinsky referred to the Große Fuge, of the late quartets, as, "...this absolutely contemporary piece of music that will be contemporary forever."

The string quartets 1–6, Op. 18, were written in the classical style, in the same year that Haydn wrote his Op. 76 string quartets. Even here, Beethoven stretched the formal structures pioneered by Haydn and Mozart. In the quartet Op. 18, No. 1, in F major, for example, there is a long, lyrical solo for cello in the second movement, giving the cello a new type of voice in the quartet conversation. And the last movement of Op. 18, No. 6, "La Malincolia", creates a new type of formal structure, interleaving a slow, melancholic section with a manic dance. Beethoven was to use this form in later quartets, and Brahms and others adopted it as well.

Beethoven: Quartet, Op. 59, No. 3, played by the Modigliani Quartet

Piano Trio, Op. 70, No. 1, "Ghost", played by the Claremont Trio

In the years 1805 to 1806, Beethoven composed the three Op. 59 quartets on a commission from Count Razumovsky, who played second violin in their first performance. These quartets, from Beethoven's middle period, were pioneers in the romantic style. Besides introducing many structural and stylistic innovations, these quartets were much more difficult technically to perform – so much so that they were, and remain, beyond the reach of many amateur string players. When first violinist Ignaz Schuppanzigh complained of their difficulty, Beethoven retorted, "Do you think I care about your wretched violin when the spirit moves me?" Among the difficulties are complex syncopations and cross-rhythms; synchronized runs of sixteenth, thirty-second, and sixty-fourth notes; and sudden modulations requiring special attention to intonation. In addition to the Op. 59 quartets, Beethoven wrote two more quartets during his middle period – Op. 74, the "Harp" quartet, named for the unusual harp-like effect Beethoven creates with pizzicato passages in the first movement, and Op. 95, the "Serioso".

The Serioso is a transitional work that ushers in Beethoven's late period – a period of compositions of great introspection. "The particular kind of inwardness of Beethoven's last style period", writes Joseph Kerman, gives one the feeling that "the music is sounding only for the composer and for one other auditor, an awestruck eavesdropper: you." In the late quartets, the quartet conversation is often disjointed, proceeding like a stream of consciousness. Melodies are broken off, or passed in the middle of the melodic line from instrument to instrument. Beethoven uses new effects, never before essayed in the string quartet literature: the ethereal, dreamlike effect of open intervals between the high E string and the open A string in the second movement of quartet Op. 132; the use of sul ponticello (playing on the bridge of the violin) for a brittle, scratchy sound in the Presto movement of Op. 131; the use of the Lydian mode, rarely heard in Western music for 200 years, in Op. 132; a cello melody played high above all the other strings in the finale of Op. 132. Yet for all this disjointedness, each quartet is tightly designed, with an overarching structure that ties the work together.

Beethoven wrote eight piano trios, five string trios, two string quintets, and numerous pieces for wind ensemble. He also wrote ten sonatas for violin and piano and five sonatas for cello and piano.

=== Franz Schubert ===
Schubert Octet
D. 803, first movement, performed on period instruments

As Beethoven, in his last quartets, went off in his own direction, Franz Schubert carried on and established the emerging romantic style. In his 31 years, Schubert devoted much of his life to chamber music, composing 15 string quartets, two piano trios, string trios, a piano quintet commonly known as the Trout Quintet, an octet for strings and winds, and his famous quintet for two violins, viola, and two cellos.

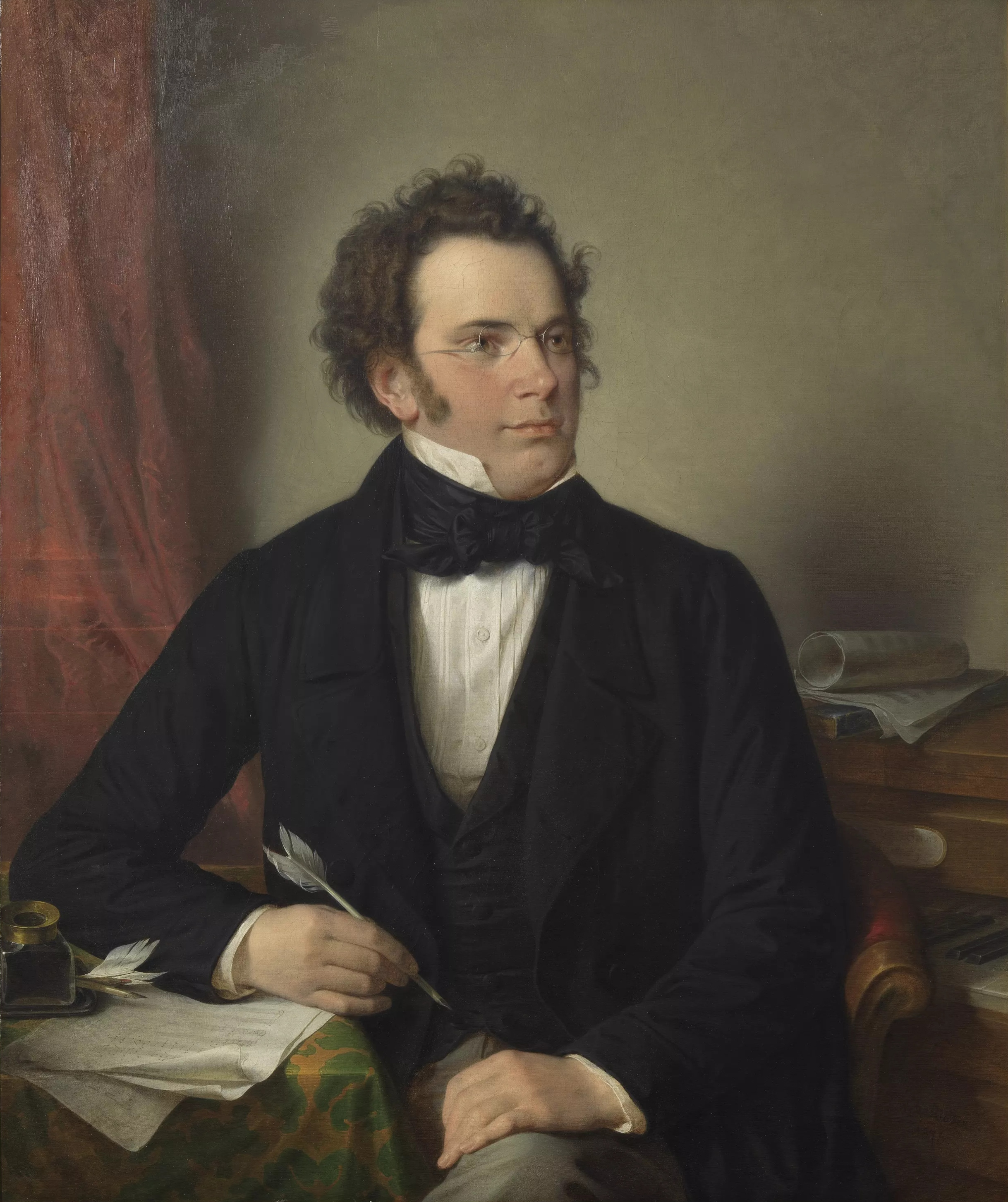

Franz Schubert, Trout Quintet, D. 667, performed by the Chamber Music Society of Lincoln Center

Schubert on YouTube: String Quintet in C, D. 956, first movement, recorded at the Fredonia Quartet Program, July 2008

Schubert's music, as his life, exemplified the contrasts and contradictions of his time. On the one hand, he was the darling of Viennese society: he starred in soirées that became known as Schubertiaden, where he played his light, mannered compositions that expressed the gemütlichkeit of Vienna of the 1820s. On the other hand, his own short life was shrouded in tragedy, wracked by poverty and ill health. Chamber music was the ideal medium to express this conflict, "to reconcile his essentially lyric themes with his feeling for dramatic utterance within a form that provided the possibility of extreme color contrasts." The String Quintet in C, D.956, is an example of how this conflict is expressed in music. After a slow introduction, the first theme of the first movement, fiery and dramatic, leads to a bridge of rising tension, peaking suddenly and breaking into the second theme, a lilting duet in the lower voices. The alternating Sturm und Drang and relaxation continue throughout the movement.

These contending forces are expressed in some of Schubert's other works: in the quartet Death and the Maiden, the Rosamunde quartet and in the stormy, one-movement Quartettsatz, D. 703.

=== Felix Mendelssohn ===
Mendelssohn: String quartet Op. 13
third movement by the Carmel Quartet

Unlike Schubert, Felix Mendelssohn had a life of peace and prosperity. Born into a wealthy Jewish family in Hamburg, Mendelssohn proved himself a child prodigy. By the age of 16, he had written his first major chamber work, the String Octet, Op. 20. Already in this work, Mendelssohn showed some of the unique style that was to characterize his later works; notably, the gossamer light texture of his scherzo movements, exemplified also by the Canzonetta movement of the String Quartet, Op. 12, and the scherzo of the Piano Trio No. 1 in D minor, Op. 49.

Another characteristic that Mendelssohn pioneered is the cyclic form in overall structure. This means the reuse of thematic material from one movement to the next, to give the total piece coherence. In his second string quartet, he opens the piece with a peaceful adagio section in A major, that contrasts with the stormy first movement in A minor. After the final, vigorous Presto movement, he returns to the opening adagio to conclude the piece. This string quartet is also Mendelssohn's homage to Beethoven; the work is studded with quotes from Beethoven's middle and late quartets.

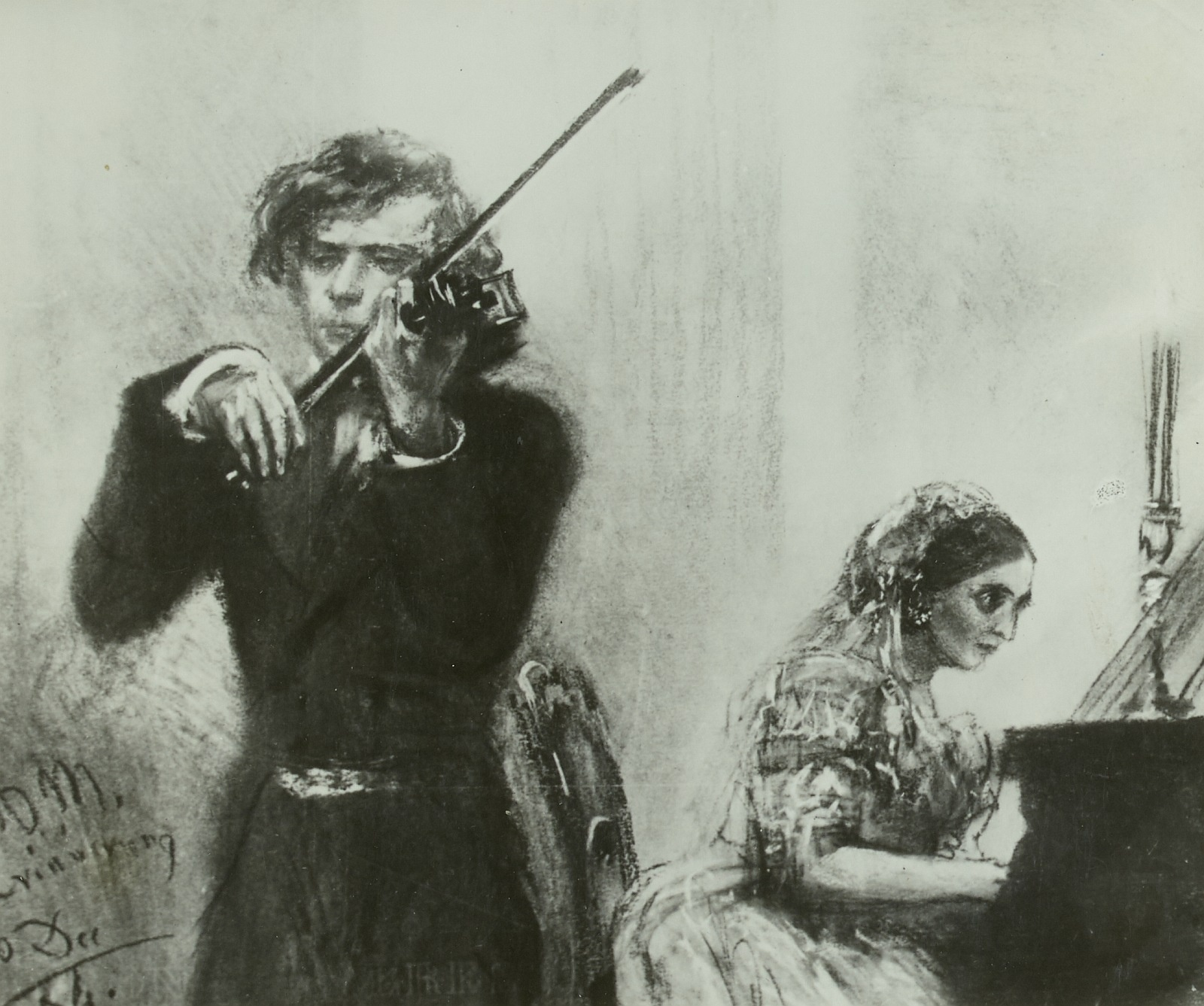
Violinist Joseph Joachim and pianist Clara Schumann. Joachim and Schumann debuted many of the chamber works of Robert Schumann, Johannes Brahms and others.

During his adult life, Mendelssohn wrote two piano trios, seven works for string quartet, two string quintets, the octet, a sextet for piano and strings, and numerous sonatas for piano with violin, cello, and clarinet.

=== Robert Schumann ===
Cyclic structure in the Schumann piano quintet

Robert Schumann continued the development of cyclic structure. In his Piano Quintet in E♭, Op. 44, Schumann wrote a double fugue in the finale, using the theme of the first movement and the theme of the last movement. Both Schumann and Mendelssohn, following the example set by Beethoven, revived the fugue, which had fallen out of favor since the Baroque period. However, rather than writing strict, full-length fugues, they used counterpoint as another mode of conversation between the chamber music instruments. Many of Schumann's chamber works, including all three of his string quartets and his piano quartet have contrapuntal sections interwoven seamlessly into the overall compositional texture.

The composers of the first half of the 19th century were acutely aware of the conversational paradigm established by Haydn and Mozart. Schumann wrote that in a true quartet "everyone has something to say ... a conversation, often truly beautiful, often oddly and turbidly woven, among four people." Their awareness is exemplified by composer and virtuoso violinist Louis Spohr. Spohr divided his 36 string quartets into two types: the quatuor brillant, essentially a violin concerto with string trio accompaniment; and quatuor dialogue, in the conversational tradition.

=== Chamber music and society in the 19th century ===
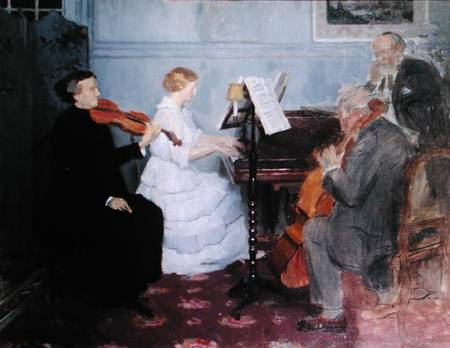
Home music-making in the 19th century; painting by Jules-Alexandre Grün.

During the 19th century, with the rise of new technology driven by the Industrial Revolution, printed music became cheaper and thus more accessible while domestic music making gained widespread popularity. Composers began to incorporate new elements and techniques into their works to appeal to this open market, since there was an increased consumer desire for chamber music. While improvements in instruments led to more public performances of chamber music, it remained very much a type of music to be played as much as performed. Amateur quartet societies sprang up throughout Europe, and no middling-sized city in Germany or France was without one. These societies sponsored house concerts, compiled music libraries, and encouraged the playing of quartets and other ensembles. In European countries, in particular Germany and France, like minded musicians were brought together and started to develop a strong connection with the community. Composers were in high favor with orchestral works and solo virtuosi works, which made up the largest part of the public concert repertoire. Early French composers including Camille Saint-Saëns and César Franck.

Apart from the "central" Austro-Germanic countries, there was an occurrence of the subculture of chamber music in other regions such as Britain. There chamber music was often performed by upper- and middle-class men with less advanced musical skills in an unexpected setting such as informal ensembles in private residence with few audience members. In Britain, the most common form of chamber music compositions are the string quartets, sentimental songs and piano chamber works like the piano trio, in a way depicts the standard conception of the conventional "Victorian music making". With the emergence of feminism in the mid-1800s, it became increasingly acceptable for women to perform chamber music.

Thousands of quartets were published by hundreds of composers; between 1770 and 1800, more than 2000 quartets were published, and the pace did not decline in the next century. Throughout the 19th century, composers published string quartets now long neglected: George Onslow wrote 36 quartets and 35 quintets; Gaetano Donizetti wrote dozens of quartets, Antonio Bazzini, Anton Reicha, Carl Reissiger, Joseph Suk and others wrote to fill an insatiable demand for quartets. In addition, there was a lively market for string quartet arrangements of popular and folk tunes, piano works, symphonies, and opera arias.

But opposing forces were at work. The middle of the 19th century saw the rise of superstar virtuosi, who drew attention away from chamber music toward solo performance. The piano, which could be mass-produced, became an instrument of preference, and many composers, like Chopin and Liszt, composed primarily if not exclusively for piano.

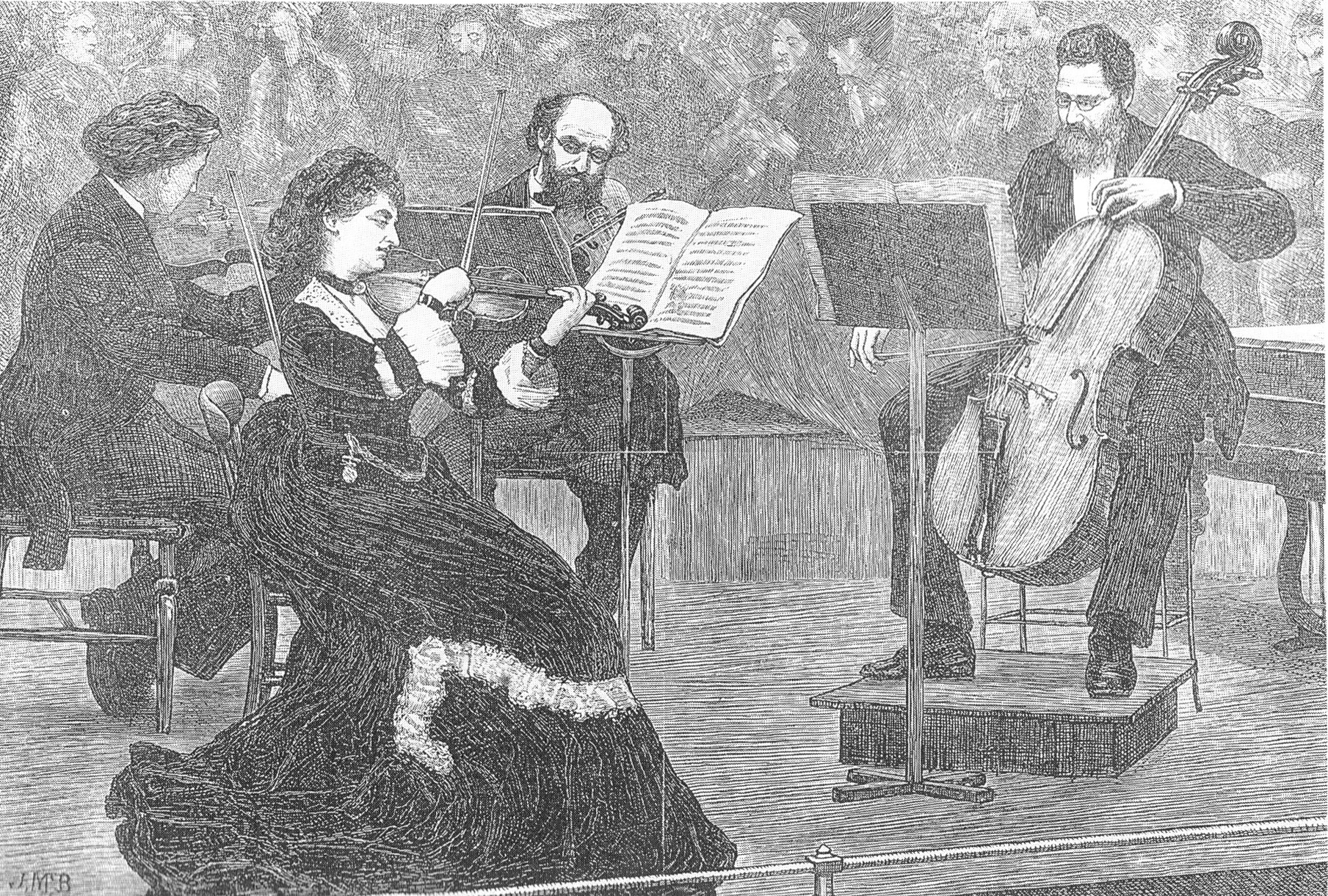
Vilemina Norman Neruda leading a string quartet, about 1880

The ascendance of the piano, and of symphonic composition, was not merely a matter of preference; it was also a matter of ideology. In the 1860s, a schism grew among romantic musicians over the direction of music. Many composers tend to express their romantic persona through their works. By the time, these chamber works are not necessarily dedicated for any specific dedicatee. Famous chamber works such as Fanny Hensel's Piano Trio in D minor, Ludwig van Beethoven's Trio in E♭ major, and Franz Schubert's Piano Quintet in A major are all highly personal. Liszt and Richard Wagner led a movement that contended that "pure music" had run its course with Beethoven, and that new, programmatic forms of music–in which music created "images" with its melodies–were the future of the art. The composers of this school had no use for chamber music. Opposing this view was Johannes Brahms and his associates, especially the powerful music critic Eduard Hanslick. This War of the Romantics shook the artistic world of the period, with vituperative exchanges between the two camps, concert boycotts, and petitions.

Although amateur playing thrived throughout the 19th century, this was also a period of increasing professionalization of chamber music performance. Professional quartets began to dominate the chamber music concert stage. The Hellmesberger Quartet, led by Joseph Hellmesberger, and the Joachim Quartet, led by Joseph Joachim, debuted many of the new string quartets by Brahms and other composers. Another famous quartet player was Vilemina Norman Neruda, also known as Lady Hallé. Indeed, during the last third of the century, women performers began taking their place on the concert stage: an all-women string quartet led by Emily Shinner, and the Lucas quartet, also all women, were two notable examples.

Meanwhile in the New World parlour music was a its high point in the late 19th century.

=== Toward the 20th century ===
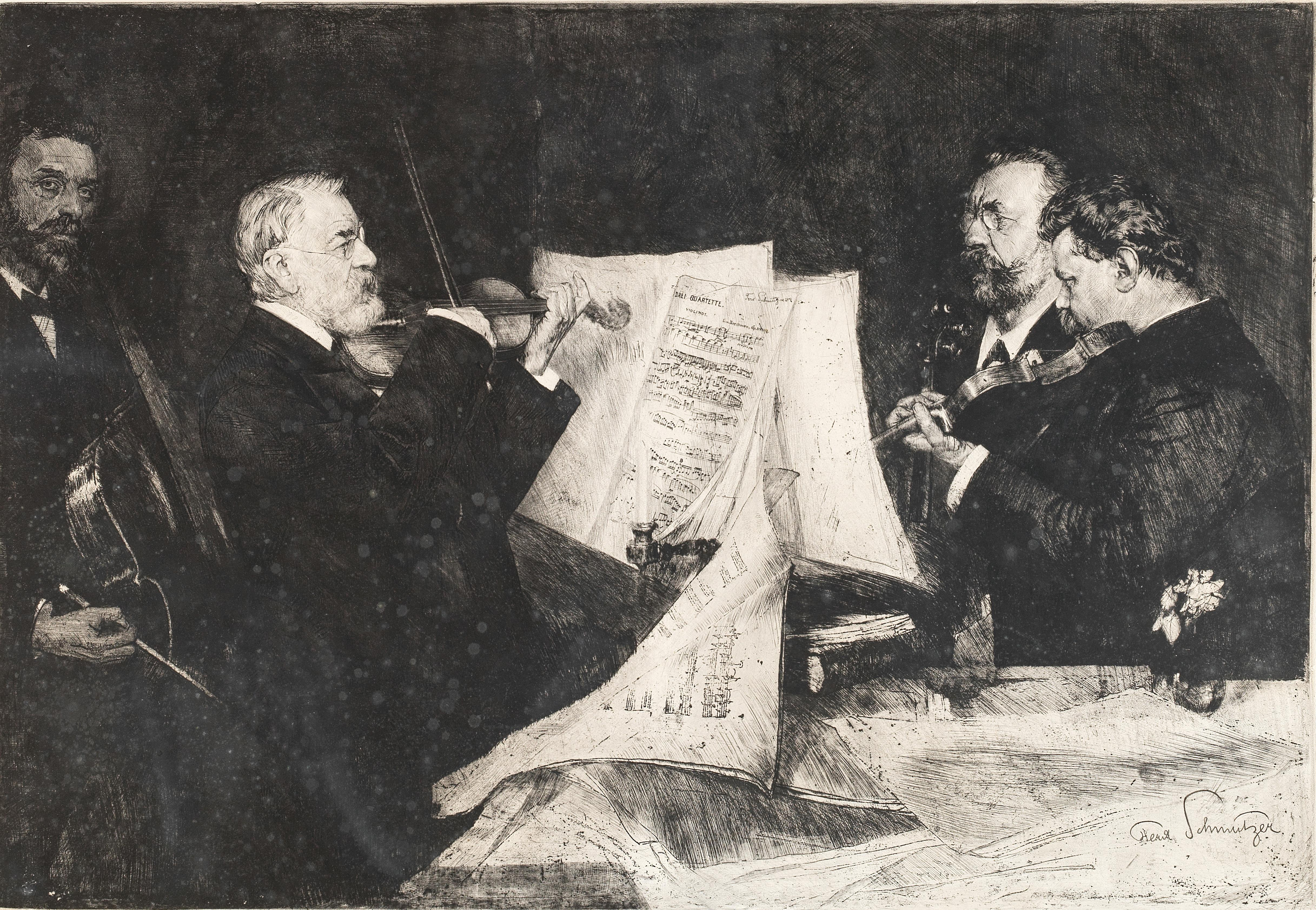
The Joachim Quartet, led by violinist Joseph Joachim. The quartet debuted many of the works of Johannes Brahms.

It was Johannes Brahms who carried the torch of Romantic music toward the 20th century. Heralded by Robert Schumann as the forger of "new paths" in music, Brahms's music is a bridge from the classical to the modern. On the one hand, Brahms was a traditionalist, conserving the musical traditions of Bach and Mozart. Throughout his chamber music, he uses traditional techniques of counterpoint, incorporating fugues and canons into rich conversational and harmonic textures. On the other hand, Brahms expanded the structure and the harmonic vocabulary of chamber music, challenging traditional notions of tonality. An example of this is in the Brahms second string sextet, Op. 36.

Traditionally, composers wrote the first theme of a piece in the key of the piece, firmly establishing that key as the tonic, or home, key of the piece. The opening theme of Op. 36 starts in the tonic (G major), but already by the third measure has modulated to the unrelated key of E♭ major. As the theme develops, it ranges through various keys before coming back to the tonic G major. This "harmonic audacity", as Swafford describes it, opened the way for bolder experiments to come.

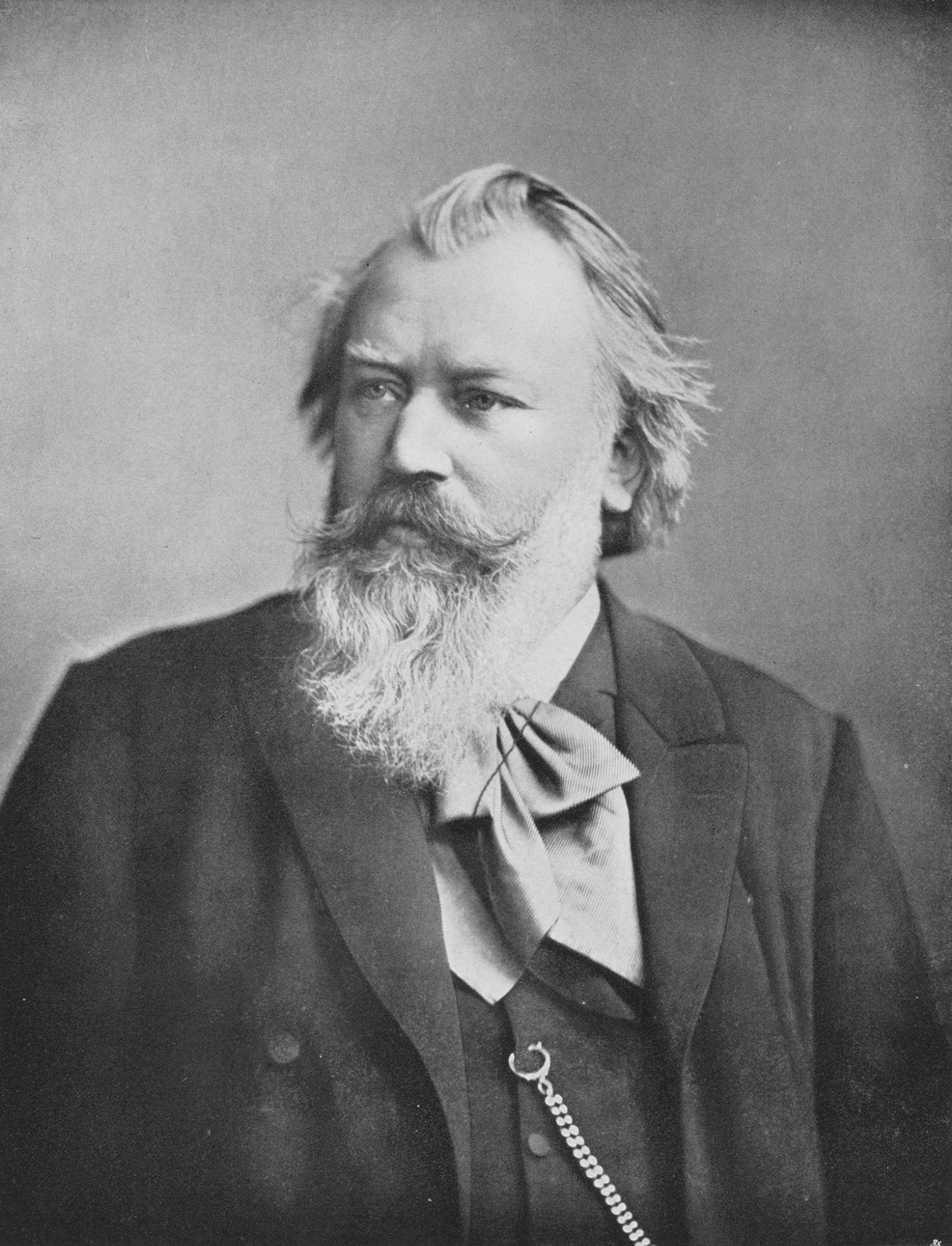

Brahms sextet Op. 36, played by the Borromeo Quartet, and Liz Freivogel and Daniel McDonough of the Jupiter String Quartet

Brahms: Clarinet Quintet, Op. 115
First movement, performed by William McColl and the Orford String Quartet

Not only in harmony, but also in overall musical structure, Brahms was an innovator. He developed a technique that Arnold Schoenberg described as "developing variation". Rather than discretely defined phrases, Brahms often runs phrase into phrase, and mixes melodic motives to create a fabric of continuous melody. Schoenberg, the creator of the 12-tone system of composition, traced the roots of his modernism to Brahms, in his essay "Brahms the Progressive".

All told, Brahms published 24 works of chamber music, including three string quartets, five piano trios, the quintet for piano and strings, Op. 34, and other works. Among his last works were the clarinet quintet, Op. 115, and a trio for clarinet, cello and piano. He wrote a trio for the unusual combination of piano, violin and horn, Op. 40. He also wrote two songs for alto singer, viola and piano, Op. 91, reviving the form of voice with string obbligato that had been virtually abandoned since the Baroque.

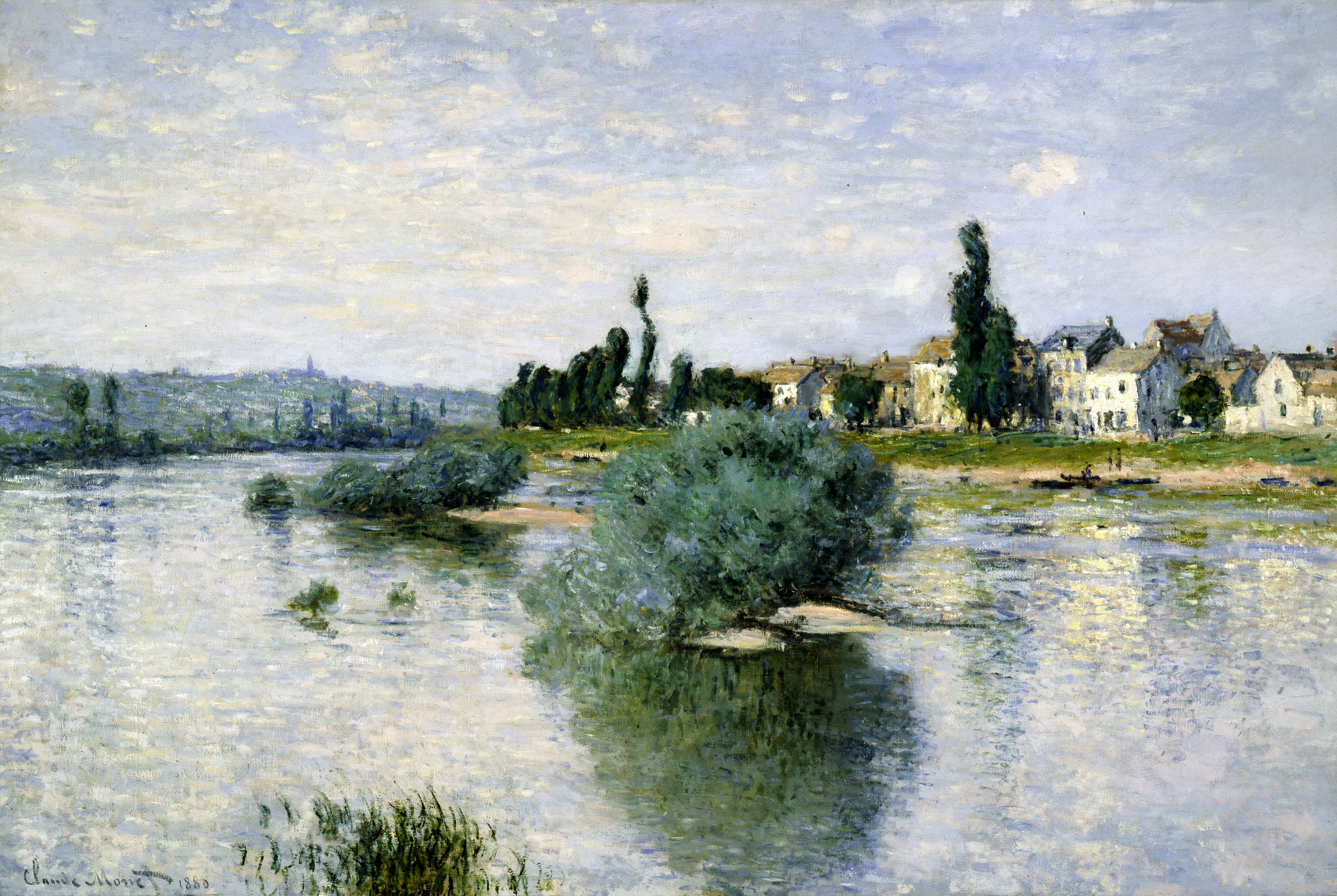
The Seine at Lavacourt by Claude Monet. Impressionist music and art sought similar effects of the ethereal, atmospheric.

The exploration of tonality and of structure begun by Brahms was continued by composers of the French school. César Franck's piano quintet in F minor, composed in 1879, further established the cyclic form first explored by Schumann and Mendelssohn, reusing the same thematic material in each of the three movements. Claude Debussy's string quartet, Op. 10, is considered a watershed in the history of chamber music. The quartet uses the cyclic structure, and constitutes a final divorce from the rules of classical harmony. "Any sounds in any combination and in any succession are henceforth free to be used in a musical continuity", Debussy wrote. Pierre Boulez said that Debussy freed chamber music from "rigid structure, frozen rhetoric and rigid aesthetics".

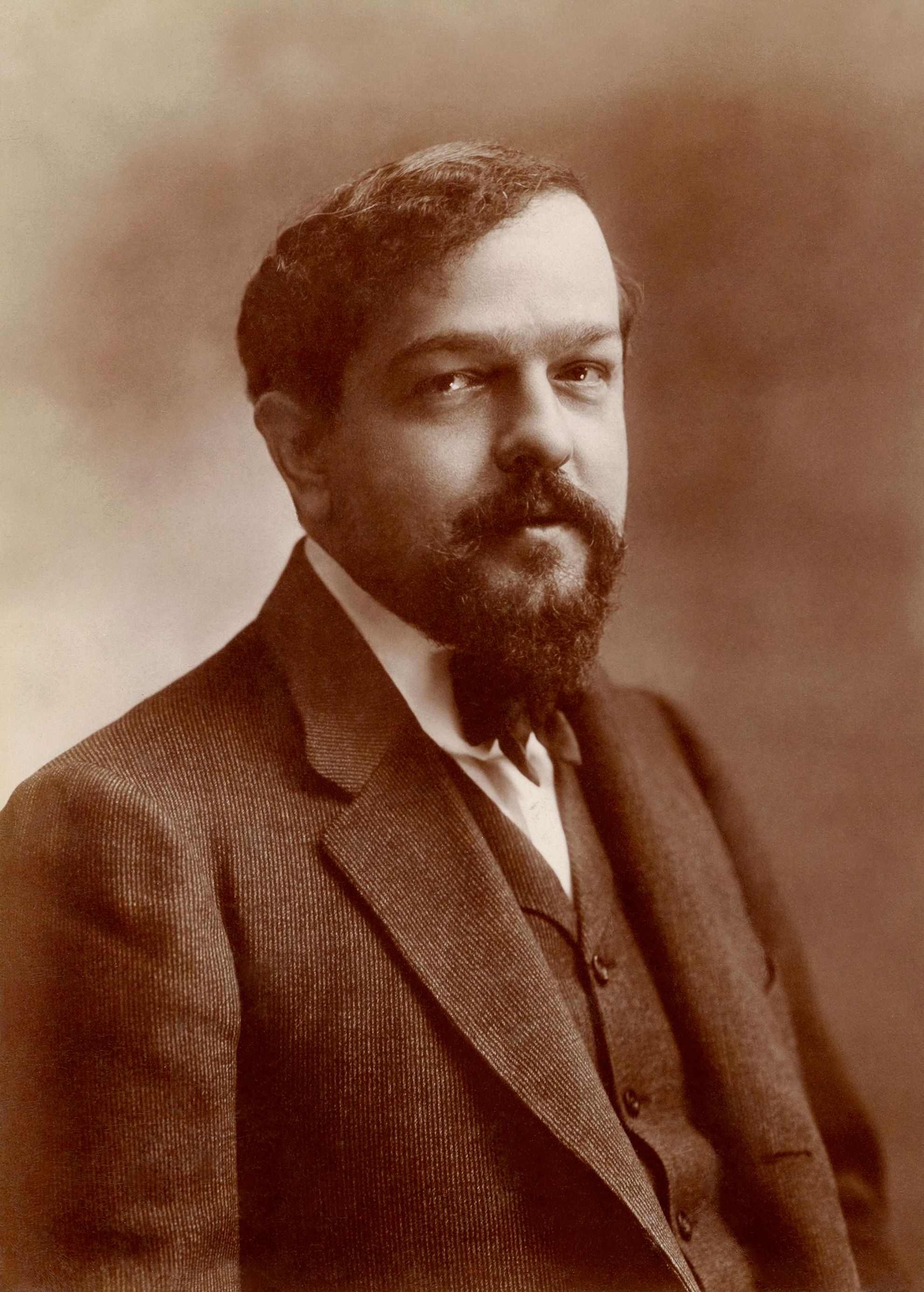

Debussy: String Quartet on YouTube, first movement, played by the Cypress String Quartet

Debussy's quartet, like the string quartets of Maurice Ravel and of Gabriel Fauré, created a new tone color for chamber music, a color and texture associated with the Impressionist movement. Violist James Dunham, of the Cleveland and Sequoia Quartets, writes of the Ravel quartet, "I was simply overwhelmed by the sweep of sonority, the sensation of colors constantly changing ..." For these composers, chamber ensembles were the ideal vehicle for transmitting this atmospheric sense, and chamber works constituted much of their oeuvre.

=== Nationalism in chamber music ===
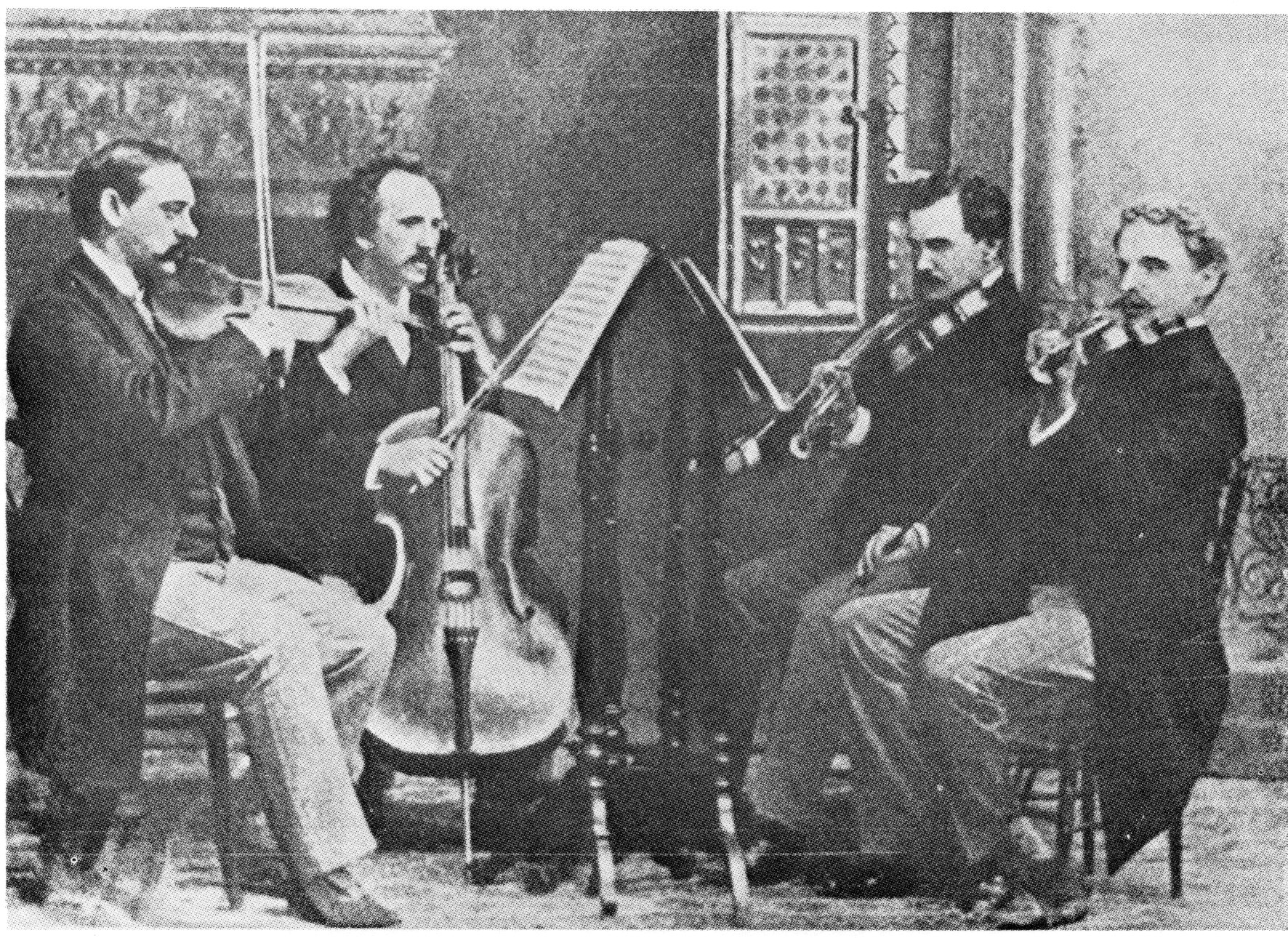
The Kneisel String Quartet, led by Franz Kneisel. This American ensemble debuted Dvořák's American Quartet, Op. 96.

Parallel with the trend to seek new modes of tonality and texture was another new development in chamber music: the rise of nationalism. Composers turned more and more to the rhythms and tonalities of their native lands for inspiration and material. "Europe was impelled by the Romantic tendency to establish in musical matters the national boundaries more and more sharply", wrote Alfred Einstein. "The collecting and sifting of old traditional melodic treasures ... formed the basis for a creative art-music." For many of these composers, chamber music was the natural vehicle for expressing their national characters.

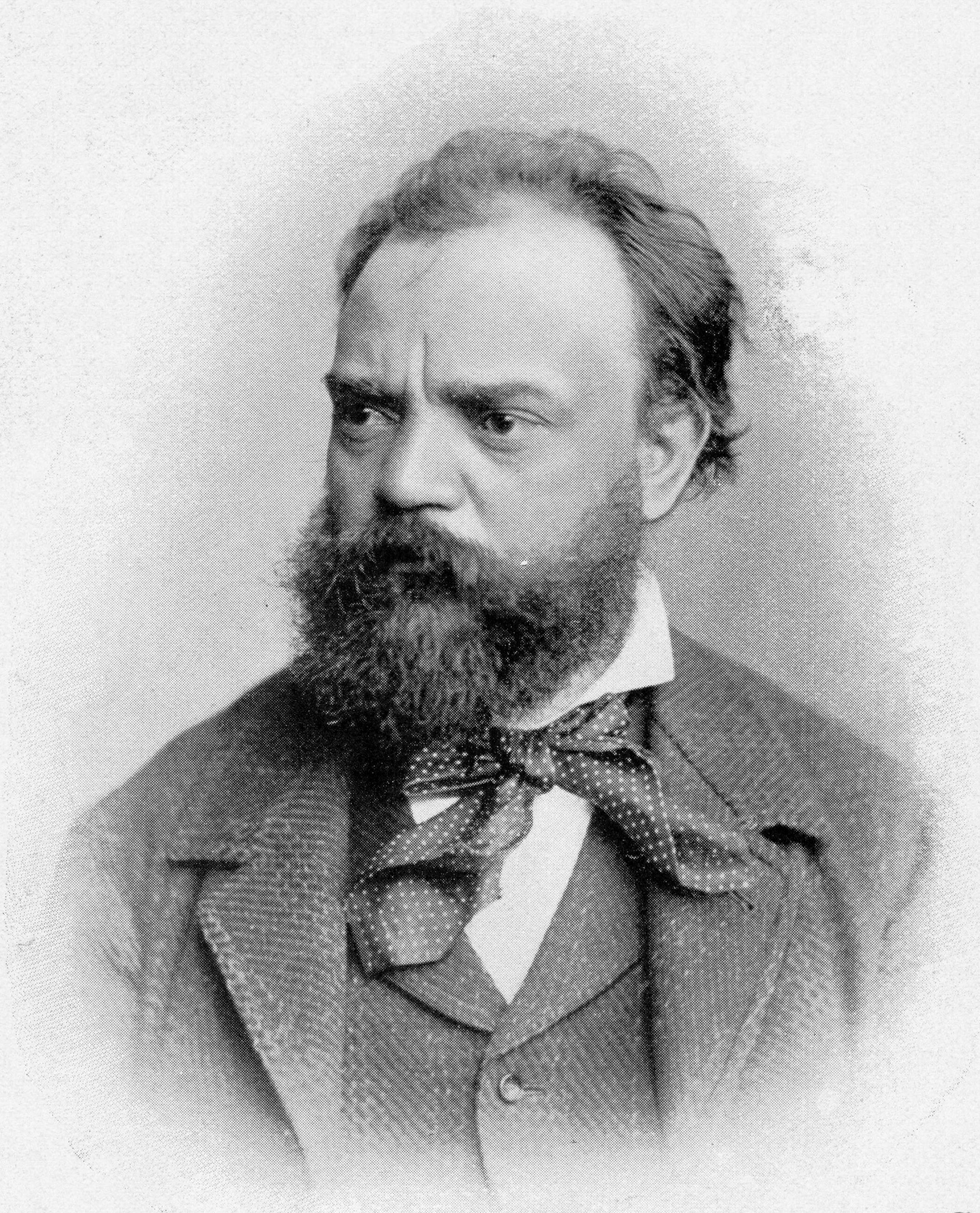

Dvořák: piano quintet, Op. 81, played by the Lincoln Center Chamber Players

Czech composer Antonín Dvořák created in his chamber music a new voice for the music of his native Bohemia. In 14 string quartets, three string quintets, two piano quartets, a string sextet, four piano trios, and numerous other chamber compositions, Dvořák incorporates folk music and modes as an integral part of his compositions. For example, in the piano quintet in A major, Op. 81, the slow movement is a Dumka, a Slavic folk ballad that alternates between a slow expressive song and a fast dance. Dvořák's fame in establishing a national art music was so great that the New York philanthropist and music connoisseur Jeannette Thurber invited him to America, to head a conservatory that would establish an American style of music. There, Dvořák wrote his string quartet in F major, Op. 96, nicknamed "The American". While composing the work, Dvořák was entertained by a group of Kickapoo Indians who performed native dances and songs, and these songs may have been incorporated in the quartet.

Bedřich Smetana, another Czech, wrote a piano trio and string quartet, both of which incorporate native Czech rhythms and melodies. In Russia, Russian folk music permeated the works of the late 19th-century composers. Pyotr Ilyich Tchaikovsky uses a typical Russian folk dance in the final movement of his string sextet, Souvenir de Florence, Op. 70. Alexander Borodin's second string quartet contains references to folk music, and the slow Nocturne movement of that quartet recalls Middle Eastern modes that were current in the Muslim sections of southern Russia. Edvard Grieg used the musical style of his native Norway in his string quartet in G minor, Op. 27 and his violin sonatas.

In Hungary, composers Zoltán Kodály and Béla Bartók pioneered the science of ethnomusicology by performing one of the first comprehensive studies of folk music. Ranging across the Magyar provinces, they transcribed, recorded, and classified tens of thousands of folk melodies. They used these tunes in their compositions, which are characterized by the asymmetrical rhythms and modal harmonies of that music. Their chamber music compositions, and those of the Czech composer Leoš Janáček, combined the nationalist trend with the 20th century search for new tonalities. Janáček's string quartets not only incorporate the tonalities of Czech folk music, they also reflect the rhythms of speech in Czech.

=== New sounds for a new world ===
The end of western tonality, begun subtly by Brahms and made explicit by Debussy, posed a crisis for composers of the 20th century. It was not merely an issue of finding new types of harmonies and melodic systems to replace the diatonic scale that was the basis of western harmony; the whole structure of western music – the relationships between movements and between structural elements within movements – was based on the relationships between different keys. So composers were challenged with building a whole new structure for music.

This was coupled with the feeling that the era that saw the invention of automobiles, the telephone, electric lighting, and world war needed new modes of expression. "The century of the aeroplane deserves its music", wrote Debussy.

==== Inspiration from folk music ====
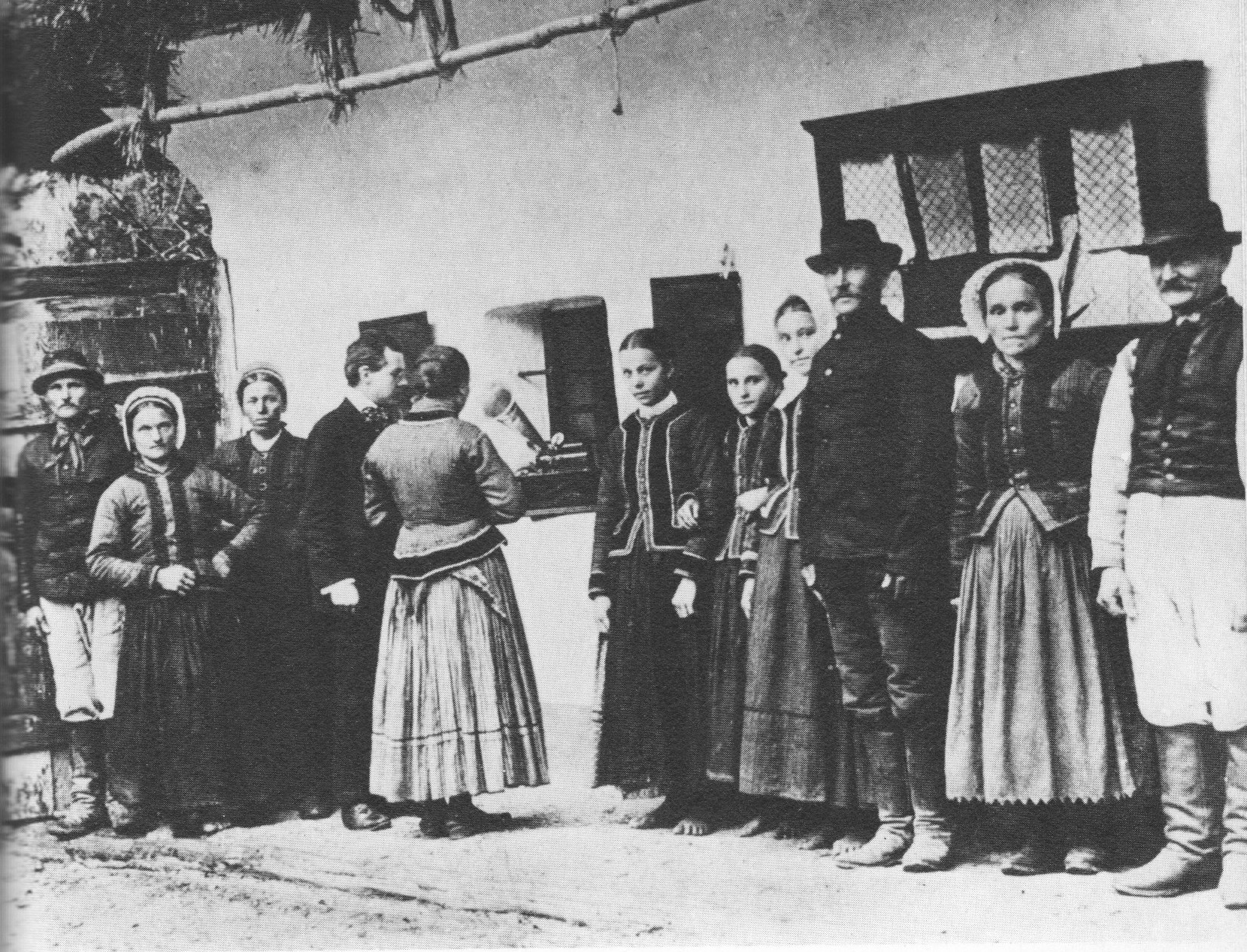
Béla Bartók recording folksongs of Czech peasants, 1908

The search for a new music took several directions. The first, led by Bartók, was toward the tonal and rhythmic constructs of folk music. Bartók's research into Hungarian and other eastern European and Middle Eastern folk music revealed to him a musical world built of musical scales that were neither major nor minor, and complex rhythms that were alien to the concert hall. In his fifth quartet, for example, Bartók uses a time signature of 3+2+2+3/8, "startling to the classically-trained musician, but second-nature to the folk musician." Structurally, also, Bartók often invents or borrows from folk modes. In the sixth string quartet, for example, Bartók begins each movement with a slow, elegiac melody, followed by the main melodic material of the movement, and concludes the quartet with a slow movement that is built entirely on this elegy. This is a form common in many folk music cultures.

Bartók string quartet number 2, second movement
Played by the Carmel Quartet

Bartók's six string quartets are often compared with Beethoven's late quartets. In them, Bartók builds new musical structures, explores sonorities never previously produced in classical music (for example, the snap pizzicato, where the player lifts the string and lets it snap back on the fingerboard with an audible buzz), and creates modes of expression that set these works apart from all others. "Bartók's last two quartets proclaim the sanctity of life, progress and the victory of humanity despite the anti-humanistic dangers of the time", writes analyst John Herschel Baron. The last quartet, written when Bartók was preparing to flee the Nazi invasion of Hungary for a new and uncertain life in the U.S., is often seen as an autobiographical statement of the tragedy of his times.

Bartók was not alone in his explorations of folk music. Igor Stravinsky's Three Pieces for String Quartet is structured as three Russian folksongs, rather than as a classical string quartet. Stravinsky, like Bartók, used asymmetrical rhythms throughout his chamber music; the Histoire du soldat, in Stravinsky's own arrangement for clarinet, violin and piano, constantly shifts time signatures between two, three, four and five beats to the bar. In Britain, composers Ralph Vaughan Williams, William Walton and Benjamin Britten drew on English folk music for much of their chamber music: Vaughan Williams incorporates folksongs and country fiddling in his first string quartet. American composer Charles Ives wrote music that was distinctly American. Ives gave programmatic titles to much of his chamber music; his first string quartet, for example, is called "From the Salvation Army", and quotes American Protestant hymns in several places.

==== Serialism, polytonality and polyrhythms ====
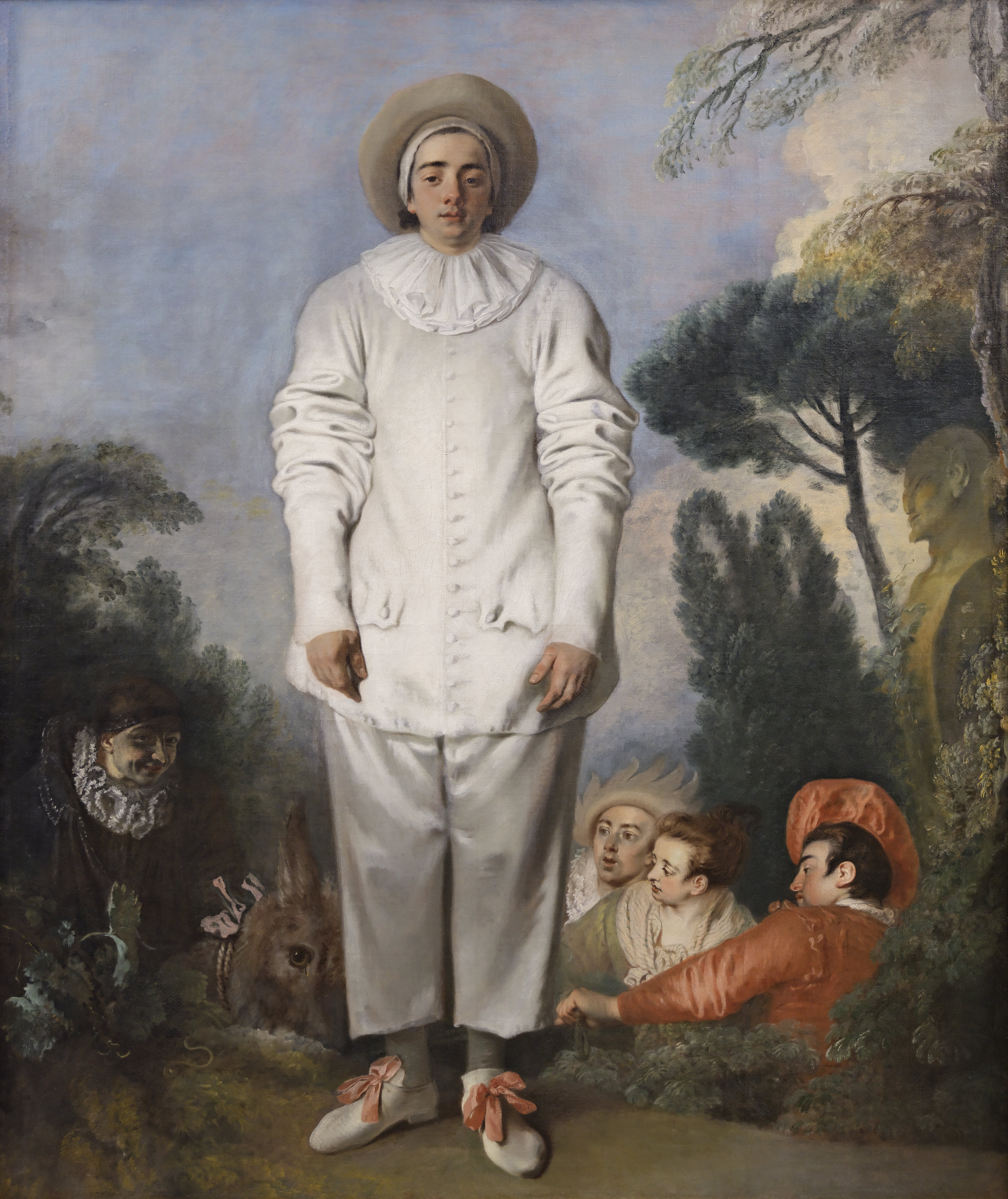
Painting of Pierrot, the object of Schoenberg's atonal suite Pierrot Lunaire, painted by Antoine Watteau

A second direction in the search for a new tonality was twelve-tone serialism. Arnold Schoenberg developed the twelve-tone method of composition as an alternative to the structure provided by the diatonic system. His method entails building a piece using a series of the twelve notes of the chromatic scale, permuting it and superimposing it on itself to create the composition.

Arnold Schoenberg: Second string quartet, fourth movement
Played by the Carmel Quartet with soprano Rona Israel-Kolatt. This is the first explicitly atonal piece.

Schoenberg did not arrive immediately at the serial method. His first chamber work, the string sextet Verklärte Nacht, was mostly a late German romantic work, though it was bold in its use of modulations. The first work that was frankly atonal was the second string quartet; the last movement of this quartet, which includes a soprano, has no key signature. Schoenberg further explored atonality with Pierrot Lunaire, for singer, flute or piccolo, clarinet, violin, cello and piano. The singer uses a technique called Sprechstimme, halfway between speech and song.

After developing the twelve-tone technique, Schoenberg wrote a number of chamber works, including two more string quartets, a string trio, and a wind quintet. He was followed by a number of other twelve-tone composers, the most prominent of whom were his students Alban Berg, who wrote the Lyric Suite for string quartet, and Anton Webern, who wrote Five Movements for String Quartet, op. 5.

Twelve-tone technique was not the only new experiment in tonality. Darius Milhaud developed the use of polytonality, that is, music where different instruments play in different keys at the same time. Milhaud wrote 18 string quartets; quartets number 14 and 15 are written so that each can be played by itself, or the two can be played at the same time as an octet. Milhaud also used jazz idioms, as in his Suite for clarinet, violin and piano.

The American composer Charles Ives used not only polytonality in his chamber works, but also polymeter. In his first string quartet he writes a section where the first violin and viola play in $\tfrac{3}{4}$ time while the second violin and cello play in $\tfrac{4}{4}$.

==== Neoclassicism ====
The plethora of directions that music took in the first quarter of the 20th century led to a reaction by many composers. Led by Stravinsky, these composers looked to the music of preclassical Europe for inspiration and stability. While Stravinsky's neoclassical works – such as the 'Concertino for String Quartet' – sound contemporary, they are modeled on Baroque and early classical forms – the canon, the fugue, and the Baroque sonata form.

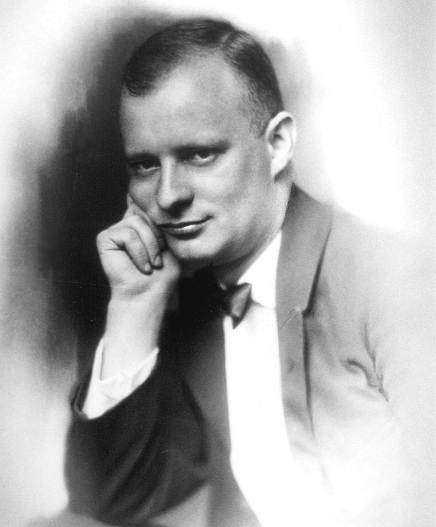

Hindemith: String Quartet 3 in C, Op. 22 on YouTube, second movement, "Schnelle Achtel", played by Ana Farmer, David Boyden, Austin Han, and Dylan Mattingly

Paul Hindemith was another neoclassicist. His many chamber works are essentially tonal, though they use many dissonant harmonies. Hindemith wrote seven string quartets and two string trios, among other chamber works. At a time when composers were writing works of increasing complexity, beyond the reach of amateur musicians, Hindemith explicitly recognized the importance of amateur music-making, and intentionally wrote pieces that were within the abilities of nonprofessional players.

The works that the composer summarised as Kammermusik, a collection of eight extended compositions, consists mostly of concertante works, comparable to Bach's Brandenburg Concertos.

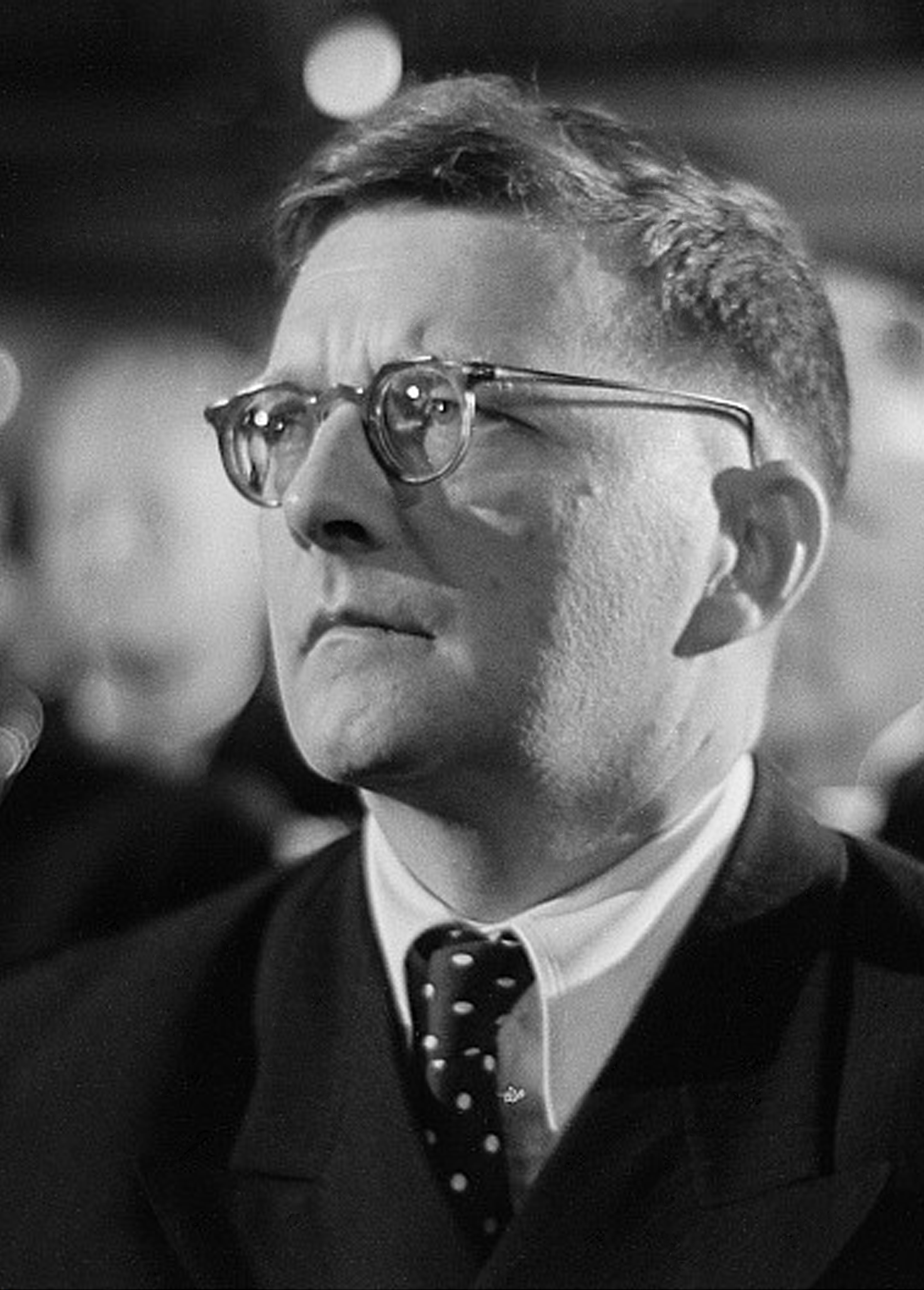

Dmitri Shostakovitch: String quartet no 8 on YouTube, Largo; Allegro molto; played by the Seraphina String Quartet (Sabrina Tabby and Caeli Smith, violins; Madeline Smith, viola; Genevieve Tabby, cello)

Dmitri Shostakovich was one of the most prolific of chamber music composers of the 20th century, writing 15 string quartets, two piano trios, the piano quintet, and numerous other chamber works. Shostakovich's music was for a long time banned in the Soviet Union and Shostakovich himself was in personal danger of deportation to Siberia. His eighth quartet is an autobiographical work, that expresses his deep depression from his ostracization, bordering on suicide: it quotes from previous compositions, and uses the four-note motif DSCH, the composer's initials.

=== Stretching the limits ===
As the century progressed, many composers created works for small ensembles that, while they formally might be considered chamber music, challenged many of the fundamental characteristics that had defined the genre over the last 150 years.

==== Music of friends ====
The idea of composing music that could be played at home has been largely abandoned. Bartók was among the first to part with this idea. "Bartók never conceived these quartets for private performance but rather for large, public concerts." Aside from the many almost insurmountable technical difficulties of many modern pieces, some of them are hardly suitable for performance in a small room. For example, Different Trains by Steve Reich is scored for live string quartet and recorded tape, which layers together a carefully orchestrated sound collage of speech, recorded train sounds, and three string quartets.

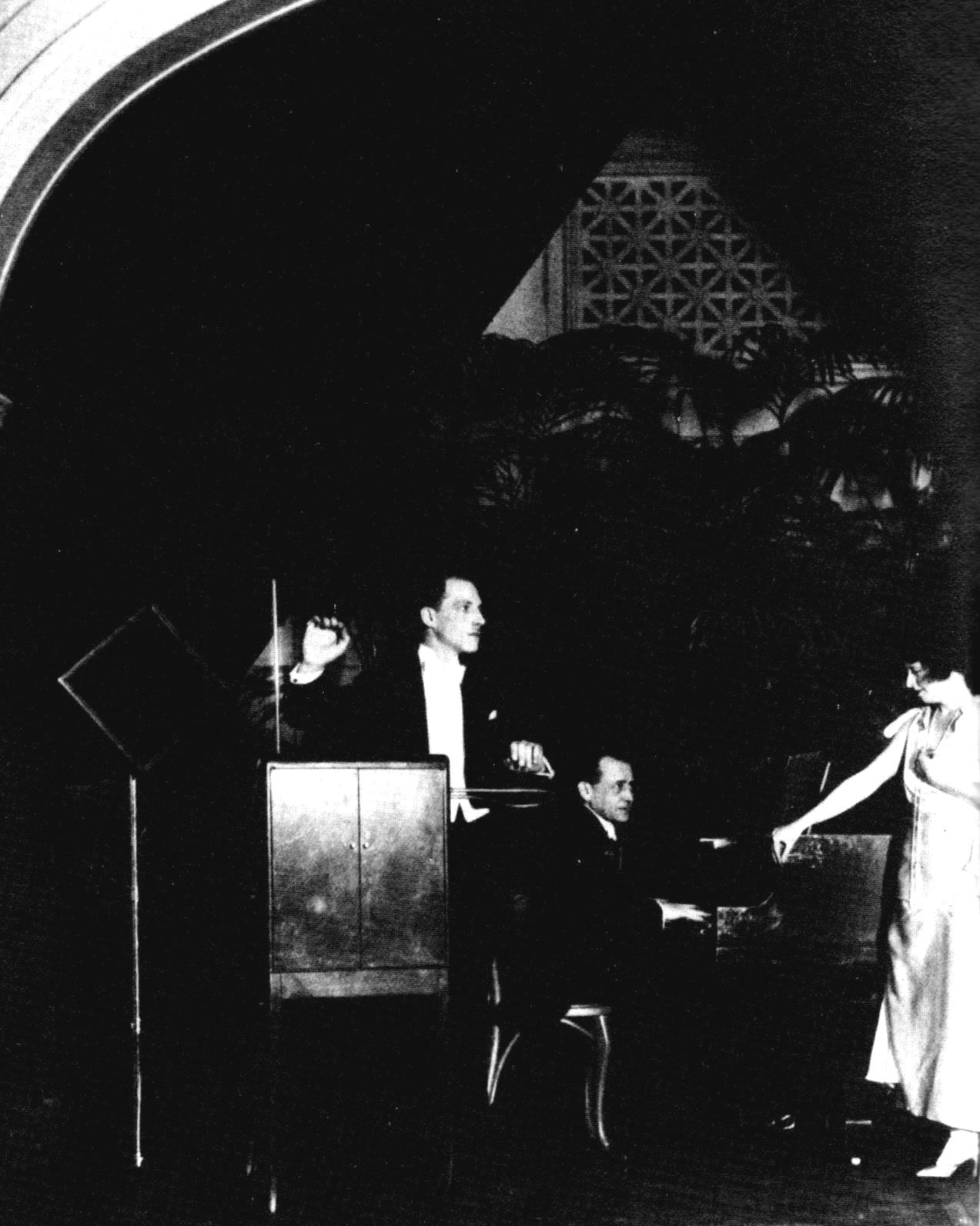
Leon Theremin performing a trio for voice, piano and theremin, 1924

==== Relation of composer and performer ====
Traditionally, the composer wrote the notes, and the performer interpreted them. But this is no longer the case in much modern music. In Für kommende Zeiten (For Times to Come), Stockhausen writes verbal instructions describing what the performers are to play. "Star constellations/with common points/and falling stars ... Abrupt end" is a sample.

Composer Terry Riley describes how he works with the Kronos Quartet, an ensemble devoted to contemporary music: "When I write a score for them, it's an unedited score. I put in just a minimal amount of dynamics and phrasing marks ...we spend a lot of time trying out different ideas in order to shape the music, to form it. At the end of the process, it makes the performers actually own the music. That to me is the best way for composers and musicians to interact."

==== New sounds ====
Composers seek new timbres, remote from the traditional blend of strings, piano and woodwinds that characterized chamber music in the 19th century. This search led to the incorporation of new instruments in the 20th century, such as the theremin and the synthesizer in chamber music compositions.

Many composers sought new timbres within the framework of traditional instruments. "Composers begin to hear new timbres and new timbral combinations, which are as important to the new music of the twentieth century as the so-called breakdown of functional tonality," writes music historian James McCalla. Examples are numerous: Bartók's Sonata for Two Pianos and Percussion (1937), Schoenberg's Pierrot lunaire, Charles Ives's Quartertone Pieces for two pianos tuned a quartertone apart. Other composers used electronics and extended techniques to create new sonorities. An example is George Crumb's Black Angels, for electric string quartet (1970). The players not only bow their amplified instruments, they also beat on them with thimbles, pluck them with paper clips and play on the wrong side of the bridge or between the fingers and the nut. Still other composers have sought to explore the timbres created by including instruments which are not often associated with a typical orchestral ensemble. For example, Robert Davine explores the orchestral timbres of the accordion when it is included in a traditional wind trio in his Divertimento for accordion, flute, clarinet and bassoon. and Karlheinz Stockhausen wrote a Helicopter String Quartet.

Excerpt from Bartók's Sonata for two pianos and percussion

What do these changes mean for the future of chamber music? "With the technological advances have come questions of aesthetics and sociological changes in music", writes analyst Baron. "These changes have often resulted in accusations that technology has destroyed chamber music and that technological advance is in inverse proportion to musical worth. The ferocity of these attacks only underscores how fundamental these changes are, and only time will tell if humankind will benefit from them."

=== In contemporary society ===
Analysts agree that the role of chamber music in society has changed profoundly in the last 50 years; yet there is little agreement as to what that change is. On the one hand, Baron contends that "chamber music in the home ... remained very important in Europe and America until the Second World War, after which the increasing invasion of radio and recording reduced its scope considerably." This view is supported by subjective impressions. "Today there are so many more millions of people listening to music, but far fewer playing chamber music just for the pleasure of it", says conductor and pianist Daniel Barenboim.

However, recent surveys suggest there is, on the contrary, a resurgence of home music making. In the radio program "Amateurs Help Keep Chamber Music Alive" from 2005, reporter Theresa Schiavone cites a Gallup poll showing an increase in the sale of stringed instruments in America. Joe Lamond, president of the National Association of Music Manufacturers (NAMM) attributes the increase to a growth of home music-making by adults approaching retirement. "I would really look to the demographics of the [baby] boomers", he said in an interview. These people "are starting to look for something that matters to them ... nothing makes them feel good more than playing music."

A study by the European Music Office in 1996 suggests that not only older people are playing music. "The number of adolescents today to have done music has almost doubled by comparison with those born before 1960", the study shows. While most of this growth is in popular music, some is in chamber music and art music, according to the study.

While there is no agreement about the number of chamber music players, the opportunities for amateurs to play have certainly grown. The number of chamber music camps and retreats, where amateurs can meet for a weekend or a month to play together, has burgeoned. Music for the Love of It, an organization to promote amateur playing, publishes a directory of music workshops that lists more than 500 workshops in 24 countries for amateurs in 2008 The Associated Chamber Music Players (ACMP) offers a directory of over 5,000 amateur players worldwide who welcome partners for chamber music sessions.

Regardless of whether the number of amateur players has grown or shrunk, the number of chamber music concerts in the west has increased greatly in the last 20 years. Concert halls have largely replaced the home as the venue for concerts. Baron suggests that one of the reasons for this surge is "the spiraling costs of orchestral concerts and the astronomical fees demanded by famous soloists, which have priced both out of the range of most audiences." The repertoire at these concerts is almost universally the classics of the 19th century. However, modern works are increasingly included in programs, and some groups, like the Kronos Quartet, devote themselves almost exclusively to contemporary music and new compositions; and ensembles like the Turtle Island String Quartet, that combine classical, jazz, rock and other styles to create crossover music. Cello Fury and Project Trio offer a new spin to the standard chamber ensemble. Cello Fury consists of three cellists and a drummer and Project Trio includes a flutist, bassist, and cellist.

The Simple Measures ensemble on YouTube plays chamber music in a Seattle streetcar

Several groups such as Classical Revolution and Simple Measures have taken classical chamber music out of the concert hall and into the streets. Simple Measures, a group of chamber musicians in Seattle (Washington, US), gives concerts in shopping centers, coffee shops, and streetcars. The Providence (Rhode Island, US) String Quartet has started the "Storefront Strings" program, offering impromptu concerts and lessons out of a storefront in one of Providence's poorer neighborhoods. "What really makes this for me", said Rajan Krishnaswami, cellist and founder of Simple Measures, "is the audience reaction ... you really get that audience feedback."

== Performance ==
Chamber music performance is a specialized field, and requires a number of skills not normally required for the performance of symphonic or solo music. Many performers and authors have written about the specialized techniques required for a successful chamber musician. Chamber music playing, writes M. D. Herter Norton, requires that "individuals ... make a unified whole yet remain individuals. The soloist is a whole unto himself, and in the orchestra individuality is lost in numbers ...".

=== "Music of friends" ===
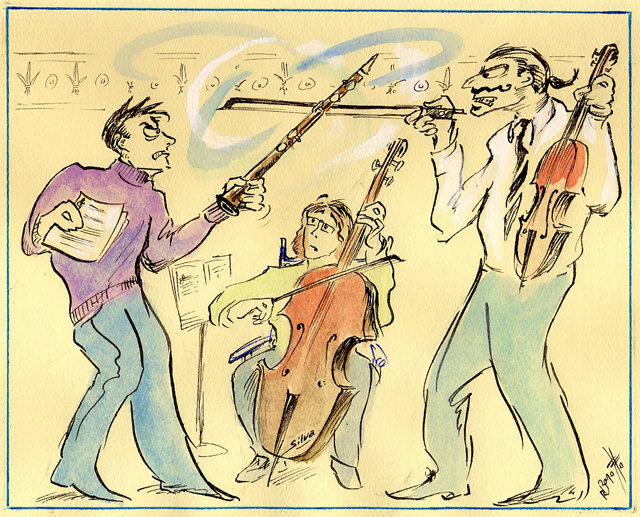
Chamber musicians going at each other, from "The Short-tempered Clavichord" by illustrator Robert Bonotto

Many performers contend that the intimate nature of chamber music playing requires certain personality traits.

David Waterman, cellist of the Endellion Quartet, writes that the chamber musician "needs to balance assertiveness and flexibility." Good rapport is essential. Arnold Steinhardt, first violinist of the Guarneri Quartet, notes that many professional quartets suffer from frequent turnover of players. "Many musicians cannot take the strain of going mano a mano with the same three people year after year."

Mary Norton, a violinist who studied quartet playing with the Kneisel Quartet at the beginning of the last century, goes so far that players of different parts in a quartet have different personality traits. "By tradition the first violin is the leader" but "this does not mean a relentless predominance." The second violinist "is a little everybody's servant." "The artistic contribution of each member will be measured by his skill in asserting or subduing that individuality which he must possess to be at all interesting."

=== Interpretation ===
"For an individual, the problems of interpretation are challenging enough", writes Waterman, "but for a quartet grappling with some of the most profound, intimate and heartfelt compositions in the music literature, the communal nature of decision-making is often more testing than the decisions themselves."

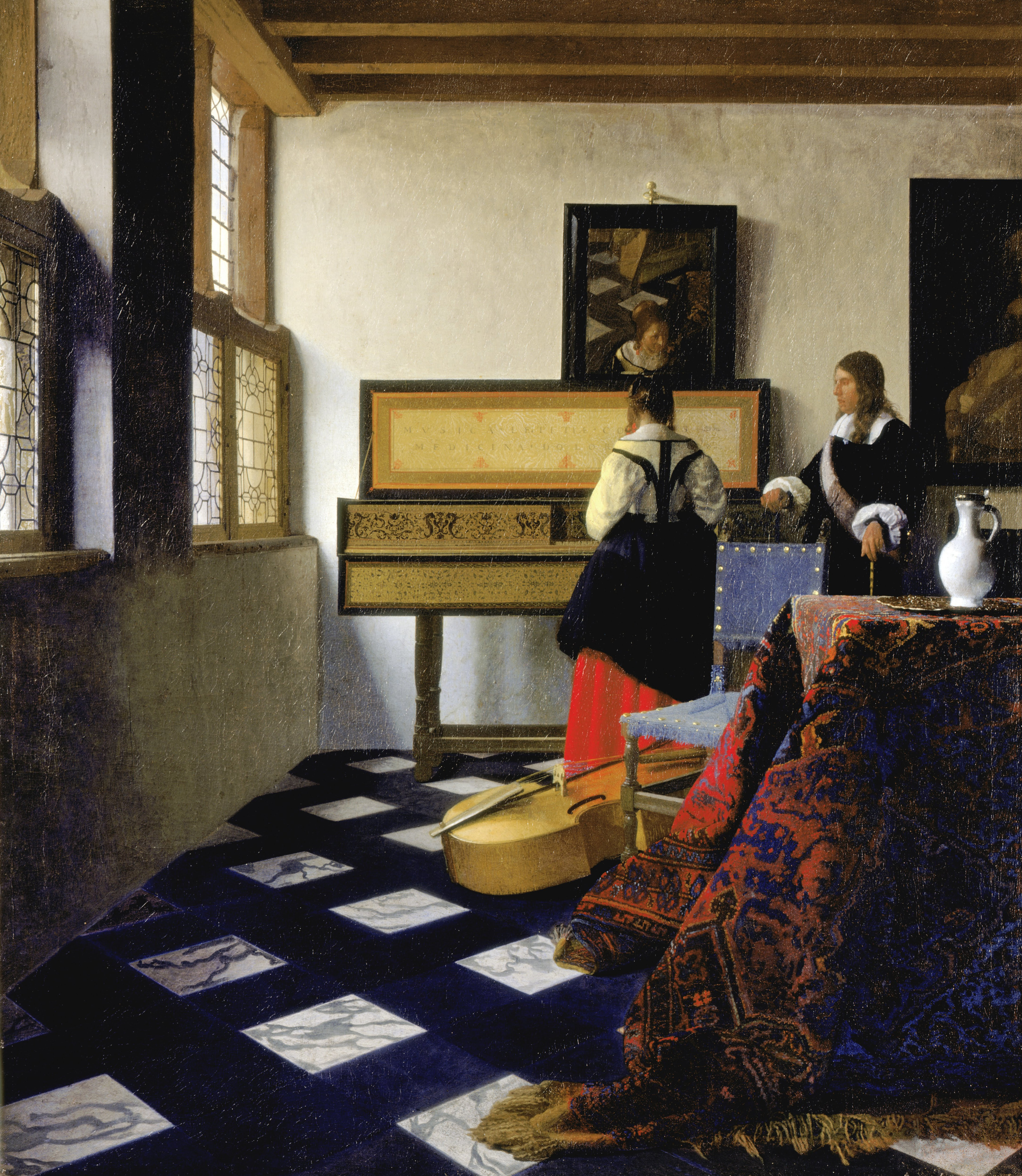

Quartet lesson on YouTube – Daniel Epstein teaching the Schumann piano quartet at Manhattan School of Music
(Picture: The Music Lesson by Jan Vermeer)

The problem of finding agreement on musical issues is complicated by the fact that each player is playing a different part, that may appear to demand dynamics or gestures contrary to those of other parts in the same passage. Sometimes these differences are even specified in the score – for example, where cross-dynamics are indicated, with one instrument crescendoing while another is getting softer.

One of the issues that must be settled in rehearsal is who leads the ensemble at each point of the piece. Normally, the first violin leads the ensemble. By leading, this means that the violinist indicates the start of each movement and their tempos by a gesture with her head or bowing hand. However, there are passages that require other instruments to lead. For example, John Dalley, second violinist of the Guarneri Quartet, says, "We'll often ask [the cellist] to lead in pizzicato passages. A cellist's preparatory motion for pizzicato is larger and slower than that of a violinist."

Players discuss issues of interpretation in rehearsal; but often, in mid-performance, players do things spontaneously, requiring the other players to respond in real time. "After twenty years in the [Guarneri] Quartet, I'm happily surprised on occasion to find myself totally wrong about what I think a player will do, or how he'll react in a particular passage", says violist Michael Tree.

=== Ensemble, blend, and balance ===
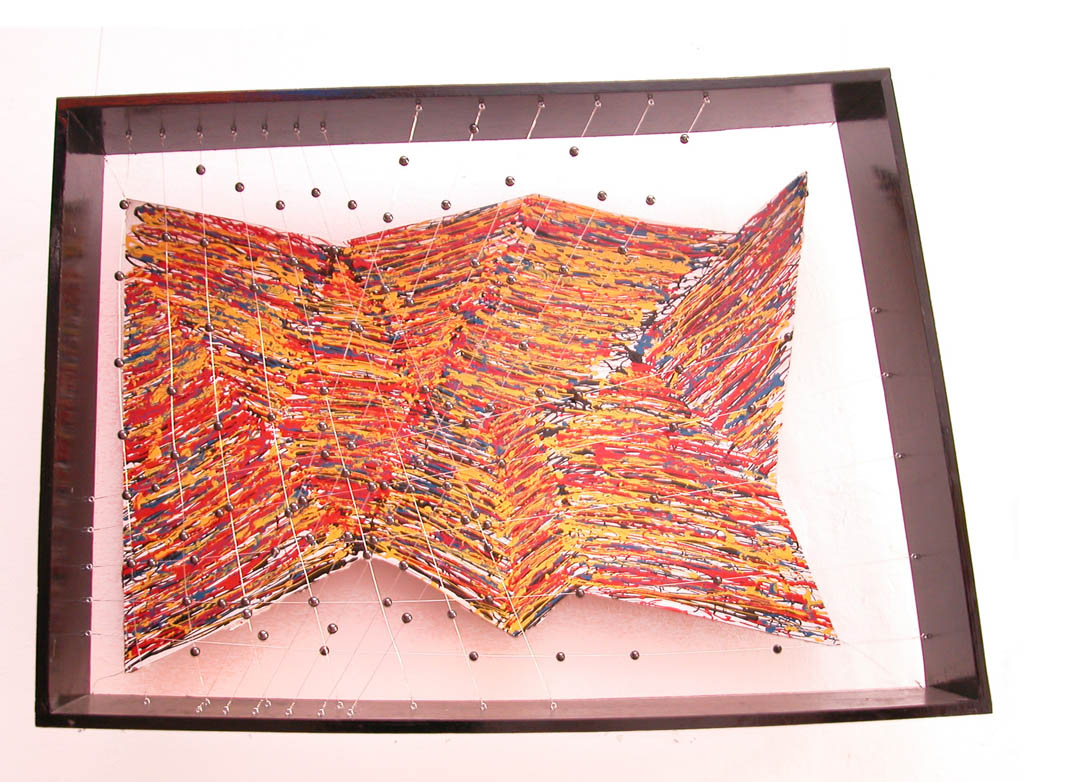
A graphic interpretation of the Burletta movement of Bartók's String Quartet No. 6, by artist Joel Epstein

Playing together constitutes a major challenge to chamber music players. Many compositions pose difficulties in coordination, with figures such as hemiolas, syncopation, fast unison passages and simultaneously sounded notes that form chords that are challenging to play in tune. But beyond the challenge of merely playing together from a rhythmic or intonation perspective is the greater challenge of sounding good together.

To create a unified chamber music sound – to blend – the players must coordinate the details of their technique. They must decide when to use vibrato and how much. They often need to coordinate their bowing and "breathing" between phrases, to ensure a unified sound. They need to agree on special techniques, such as spiccato, sul tasto, sul ponticello, and so on.

Balance refers to the relative volume of each of the instruments. Because chamber music is a conversation, sometimes one instrument must stand out, sometimes another. It is not always a simple matter for members of an ensemble to determine the proper balance while playing; frequently, they require an outside listener, or a recording of their rehearsal, to tell them that the relations between the instruments are correct.

=== Intonation ===
Chamber music playing presents special problems of intonation. The piano is tuned using equal temperament, that is, the 12 notes of the scale are spaced exactly equally. This method makes it possible for the piano to play in any key; however, all the intervals except the octave sound very slightly out of tune. String players can play with just intonation, that is, they can play specific intervals (such as fifths) exactly in tune. Moreover, string and wind players can use expressive intonation, changing the pitch of a note to create a musical or dramatic effect. "String intonation is more expressive and sensitive than equal-tempered piano intonation."

However, using true and expressive intonation requires careful coordination with the other players, especially when a piece is going through harmonic modulations. "The difficulty in string quartet intonation is to determine the degree of freedom you have at any given moment", says Steinhardt.

== The chamber music experience ==
Players of chamber music, both amateur and professional, attest to a unique enchantment with playing in ensemble. "It is not an exaggeration to say that there opened out before me an enchanted world", writes Walter Willson Cobbett, instigator of the Cobbett Competition, Cobbett Medal and editor of Cobbett's Cyclopedic Survey of Chamber Music.

Ensembles develop a close intimacy of shared musical experience. "It is on the concert stage where the moments of true intimacy occur", writes Steinhardt. "When a performance is in progress, all four of us together enter a zone of magic somewhere between our music stands and become a conduit, messenger, and missionary ... It is an experience too personal to talk about and yet it colors every aspect of our relationship, every good-natured musical confrontation, all the professional gossip, the latest viola joke."

The playing of chamber music has been the inspiration for numerous books, both fiction and nonfiction. An Equal Music by Vikram Seth, explores the life and love of the second violinist of a fictional quartet, the Maggiore. Central to the story is the tensions and the intimacy developed between the four members of the quartet. "A strange composite being we are [in performance], not ourselves any more, but the Maggiore, composed of so many disjunct parts: chairs, stands, music, bows, instruments, musicians ..." The Rosendorf Quartet, by Nathan Shaham, describes the trials of a string quartet in Palestine, before the establishment of the state of Israel. For the Love of It by Wayne Booth is a nonfictional account of the author's romance with cello playing and chamber music.

== Ensembles ==
This is a partial list of the types of ensembles found in chamber music. The standard repertoire for chamber ensembles is rich, and the totality of chamber music in print in sheet music form is nearly boundless. See the articles on each instrument combination for examples of repertoire.

Number of musicians	Name	Common ensembles	Instrumentation (Note: Key: vln – violin; vla – viola; vc – cello; cb – double bass; pno – piano; hrp - harp; acc - accordion; fl – flute; ob – oboe; eh – English horn; cl – clarinet; s. sax – soprano saxophone; a. sax – alto saxophone; t. sax – tenor saxophone; b. sax – baritone saxophone; bsn – bassoon; hrn – horn; tr – trumpet; trm – trombone)	Comments
2	Duo	Piano duo	2 pianos	
2	Duo	Instrumental duo	any instrument and piano	Found especially as instrumental sonatas; i.e., violin, cello, viola, horn, oboe, bassoon, clarinet, flute sonatas.
2	Duo	Instrumental duo	any instrument and basso continuo	Common in baroque music predating the piano. The basso continuo part is always present to provide rhythm and accompaniment, and is often played by a harpsichord but other instruments can also be used. Contemporaneously, however, such a work was not called a "duo" but a "solo".
2	Duet	Piano duet	1 piano, 4 hands	Mozart, Beethoven, Schubert, Brahms (original pieces and many transcriptions of his own works); a favorite domestic musical form, with many transcriptions of other genres (operas, symphonies, concertos and so on).
2	Duet	Vocal duet	voice, piano	Commonly used in the art song, or Lied.
2	Duet	Instrumental duet	2 of any instrument, either equal or not	Mozart's Duets KV 423 and 424 for vln and vla and Sonata KV 292 for bsn and vc; Beethoven's Duet for vla and vc; Bartók's Duets for 2 vln.
3	Trio	String trio	vln, vla, vc	Mozart's Divertimento K. 563 is an important example; Beethoven composed 5 trios near the beginning of his career. 2 Vln and vla trios have been written by Dvořák, Bridge and Kodály.
3	Trio	Piano trio	vln, vc, pno	Haydn, Mozart, Beethoven, Schubert, Chopin, Mendelssohn, Schumann, Brahms, Tchaikovsky, Dvořák and many others.
3	Trio	Piano trio	cl, vln, pno	Famous compositions by Bartók, Ives, Berg, Donald Martino, Milhaud and Khachaturian (all 20th-century)
3	Trio	Piano trio	cl, vla, pno	Mozart's trio K. 498, other works by Schumann and Bruch
3	Trio	Piano trio	cl, vc, pno	Beethoven's Trio Op. 11, as well as his own transcription, Op. 38, of the Septet, Op. 20; trios by Louise Farrenc and Ferdinand Ries, Brahms's trio Op. 114, Alexander von Zemlinsky's Op. 3, Robert Muczynski's Fantasy-Trio
3	Trio	Voice and piano trio	Voice, vla, pno	William Bolcom's trio "Let Evening Come" for Soprano, Viola and Piano, and Brahms' Zwei Gesänge, Op. 91, for Contralto, Viola and Piano
3	Trio	Voice and piano trio	voice, cl, pno	Schubert's "The Shepherd on the Rock", D965; Spohr's Lieder
3	Trio	Voice and piano trio	voice, hrn, pno	Schubert's "Auf Dem Strom"
3	Trio	Flute, viola and harp	fl, vla, hrp	Famous works by Debussy and Bax. A 20th-century invention now with a surprisingly large repertoire. A variant is Flute, Cello and Harp.
3	Trio	Flute trio	fl, ob, eh	Nicholas Laucella's Divertimento for flute, oboe and English horn
3	Trio	Horn trio	hrn, vln, pno	Two masterpieces by Brahms and Ligeti
3	Trio	Reed trio	ob, cl, bsn	20th-century composers such as Villa-Lobos have established this typical combination, also well suited to transcriptions of Mozart's Basset horn trios (if not to Beethoven's 2 ob. + English horn trio)
4	Quartet	String quartet	2 vln, vla, vc	Very popular form. Numerous major examples by Haydn (its creator), Mozart, Beethoven, Schubert, and many other leading composers (see article).
4	Quartet	Piano quartet	vln, vla, vc, pno	Mozart's KV 478 and 493; Beethoven youth compositions; Schumann, Brahms, Fauré
4	Quartet	Piano quartet	vln, cl, vc, pno	Rare; famous example: Messiaen's Quatuor pour la fin du temps; less famous: Hindemith (1938), Walter Rabl (Op. 1; 1896).
4	Quartet	Clarinet quartet	3 B♭ Clarinets and Bass Clarinet	Twentieth-century composers
4	Quartet	Saxophone quartet	s/a/t/b. sax or a/a/t/b. sax	Examples: Eugène Bozza, Paul Creston, Alfred Desenclos, Pierre Max Dubois, Philip Glass, Alexander Glazunov, David Maslanka, Florent Schmitt, Jean-Baptiste Singelée, Iannis Xenakis
4	Quartet	Flute quartet	4 fls or fl, vln, vla, and vlc	Examples include those by Friedrich Kuhlau, Anton Reicha, Eugène Bozza, Florent Schmitt and Joseph Jongen. 20th Century: Shigeru Kan-no
4	Quartet	Percussion quartet	4 Percussion	Twentieth-century. Composers include: John Cage, David Lang, and Paul Lansky. See So Percussion
4	Quartet	Wind instrument and String trio	vln, vla, vc and fl, ob, cl, bsn	Mozart's four Flute Quartets and one Oboe Quartet; Krommer's Flute Quartets (e.g. Op. 75), Clarinet Quartets, and Bassoon Quartets (e.g. his Op. 46 set); Devienne's Bassoon Quartet, Jörg Duda's Finnish Quartets
4	Quartet	Accordion and wind trio	acc, fl, cl, bsn	Robert Davine's Divertimento for flute, clarinet, bassoon, and accordion
4	Quartet	Piano and wind trio	pno, cl, hrn, bsn	Franz Berwald's Op. 1 (1819)
4	Quartet	Voice and piano trio	voice, pno, vln, vc	Used by Beethoven and Joseph Haydn for settings of Lieder based on folk melodies
5	Quintet	String quintet	2 vln, vla, vc with additional vla, vc, or cb	with 2nd vla: Michael Haydn, Mozart, Beethoven, Brahms, Bruckner; with 2nd vc: Boccherini, Schubert; with cb: Vagn Holmboe, Dvořák.
5	Quintet	Piano quintet	2 vln, vla, vc, pno	Schumann's Op. 44, Brahms, Bartók, Dvořák, Shostakovich and others
5	Quintet	Piano quintet	vln, vla, vc, cb, pno	An uncommon instrumentation used by Franz Schubert in his Trout Quintet as well as by Johann Nepomuk Hummel and Louise Farrenc.
5	Quintet	Piano quintet	pno, ob, cl, bsn, hrn	Mozart's KV 452, Beethoven's Op. 16, and many others, including two by Nikolai Rimsky-Korsakov and Anton Rubinstein. (The four wind instruments may vary)
5	Quintet	Wind quintet	fl, cl, ob, bsn, hrn	19th-century (Reicha, Danzi and others) and 20th-century composers (Carl Nielsen's Op. 43).
5	Quintet	Wind & strings quintet	ob, cl, vln, vla, cb	Prokofiev, Quintet in G minor Op. 39. In six movements. (1925)
5	Quintet	Brass quintet	2 tr, 1 hrn, 1 trm, 1 tuba	Mostly after 1950.
5	Quintet	Clarinet quintet	cl, 2 vln, 1 vla, 1 vc	Mozart's KV 581, Brahms's Op. 115, Weber's Op. 34, Samuel Coleridge-Taylor's Op. 10, Hindemith's Quintet (in which the clarinet player must alternate between a B♭ and an E♭ instrument), Milton Babbitt's Clarinet Quintet, and many others.
5	Quintet	Clarinet quintet	cl, pno left hand, vln, vla, vc	Schmidt's chamber pieces dedicated to the pianist Paul Wittgenstein (who played with the left hand only), although they are almost always performed nowadays in a two-hands version arranged by Friedrich Wührer.
5	Quintet	Pierrot ensemble	fl, cl, vln, vc, pno	Named after Arnold Schoenberg's Pierrot Lunaire, which was the first piece to demand this instrumentation. Other works include Joan Tower's Petroushkates, Sebastian Currier's Static, and Elliott Carter's Triple Duo. Some works, such as Pierrot Lunaire itself, augment the ensemble with voice or percussion.
5	Quintet	Reed quintet	ob, cl, a. sax, b. cl, bsn	20th and 21st centuries.
5	Quintet	Wind and string quartet	wind instrument, 2 vln, vla, vc	Mozart's Quintet for Clarinet and Strings, Brahms' Quintet for Clarinet and Strings, Franz Krommer's Quintet for Flute and Strings, Op. 66, Bax's Quintet for Oboe and Strings
6	Sextet	String sextet	2 vln, 2 vla, 2 vc	Important among these are Brahms's Op. 18 and Op. 36 Sextets, and Schoenberg's Verklärte Nacht, Op. 4 (original version).
6	Sextet	Wind sextet	2 ob, 2 bsn, 2 hrn or 2 cl, 2 hrn, 2 bsn	By Mozart there are the two types; Beethoven used the one with cl
6	Sextet	Piano and wind quintet	fl, ob, cl, bsn, hrn, pno	Such as the Poulenc Sextet, and another by Ludwig Thuille.
6	Sextet	Piano sextet	vln, 2 vla, vc, cb, pno	e.g. Mendelssohn's Op. 110, also one by Leslie Bassett. ()
6	Sextet	Piano sextet	cl, 2 vln, vla, vc, pno	Prokofiev's Overture on Hebrew Themes Op. 34, Copland's Sextet.
7	Septet	Wind and string septet	cl, hrn, bsn, vln, vla, vc, cb	Popularized by Beethoven's Septet Op. 20, Berwald's, and many others.
8	Octet	Wind and string octet	cl, hrn, bsn, 2 vln, vla, vc, cb or cl, 2 hrn, vln, 2 vla, vc, cb	Schubert's Octet D. 803 (inspired by Beethoven's Septet) and Spohr's Octet, Op. 32.
8	Octet	String octet	4 vln, 2 vla, 2 vc (less commonly 4 vln, 2 vla, vc, cb)	Popularized by Mendelssohn's String Octet Op. 20. Others (among them works by Bruch, Woldemar Bargiel, George Enescu's String Octet, Op. 7, and a pair of pieces by Shostakovich) have followed.
8	Octet	Double quartet	4 vln, 2 vla, 2 vc	Two string quartets arranged antiphonically. A genre preferred by Spohr. Milhaud's Op. 291 Octet is, rather, a couple of String Quartets (his 14th and 15th) performed simultaneously
8	Octet	Wind octet	2 ob, 2 cl, 2 hrn, 2 bsn	Mozart's KV 375 and 388, Beethoven's Op. 103, Franz Lachner's Op. 156, Reinecke's Op. 216 many written by Franz Krommer. Including one written by Stravinsky and the delightful Petite Symphonie by Gounod.
8	Octet	Vocal octet	2 sop, 2 alto, 2 ten, 2 bass	Robert Lucas de Pearsall's Lay a garland and Purcell's Hear My Prayer.
9	Nonet	Wind and string nonet	fl, ob, cl, hrn, bsn, vln, vla, vc, cb	Grand Nonetto (1813) by Spohr; Nonet (1849) by Louise Farrenc; Nonet (1875) by Franz Lachner; Petite Symphonie (1885) by Charles Gounod; Stanford's Serenade (1905); Parry's Wind Nonet (1877); Nonet (1923) by Heitor Villa-Lobos; Planos (1934) by Silvestre Revueltas; three by Bohuslav Martinů; four by Alois Hába.
10	Decet	Double wind quintet	2 ob, 2 eh, 2 cl, 2 hrn, 2 bsn 2 fl, 2 ob, 2 cl, 2 hrn and 2 bsn	There are few double wind quintets written in the 18th century (notable exceptions being partitas by Josef Reicha and Antonio Rosetti), but in the 19th and 20th centuries they are plentiful. The most common instrumentation is 2 flutes (piccolo), 2 oboes (or English horn), two clarinets, two horns and two bassoons. Some of the best 19th-century compositions are the Émile Bernard Divertissement, Arthur Bird's Suite and the Salomon Jadassohn Serenade, to name a few. In the 20th century the Decet/dixtuor in D, Op. 14 by Enescu written in 1906, is a well-known example. Frequently an additional bass instrument is added to the standard double wind quintet. Over 500 works have been written for these instruments and related ones.

== Notes ==
=== Bibliography ===
- Baron, John Herschel (1998). Intimate Music: A History of the Idea of Chamber Music. Pendragon Press. ISBN 1-57647-018-0.
- Blum, David (1986). The Art of Quartet Playing: The Guarneri Quartet in conversation with David Blum. New York: Alfred A. Knopf. ISBN 0-8014-9456-7.
- Booth, Wayne (1999). For the Love of It. Chicago: University of Chicago Press. ISBN 0-226-06585-5.
- Boyden, David (1965). The History of Violin Playing. Oxford and New York: Oxford University Press.
- Butterworth, Neil (1980). Dvorak, His Life and Times. Midas Books. ISBN 0-85936-142-X.
- Cobbett, Walter Willson, ed. (1929). Cobbett's Cyclopedic Survey of Chamber Music. London: Oxford University Press. ISBN 9781906857820 and ISBN 978-1906857844.
- Crumb, George (1971). Black Angels. Edition Peters.
- Donington, Robert (1982). Baroque Music: Style and Performance. New York: W. W. Norton. ISBN 0-393-30052-8.
- Einstein, Alfred (1947). Music in the Romantic Era. New York: W. W. Norton. ISBN 9780393097337.
- Eosze, Laszlo (1962). Zoltan Kodaly, his life and work. Istvans Farkas and Gyula Gulyas (translators). Collet's.
- Geiringer, Karl (1982). Haydn: a Creative Life in Music. University of California Press. ISBN 0-520-04317-0.
- Gjerdingen, Robert (2007). Music in the Galant Style. Oxford and New York: Oxford University Press. ISBN 978-0-19-531371-0.
- Griffiths, Paul (1978). A Concise History of Modern Music. Thames and Hudson. ISBN 0-500-20164-1.
- Griffiths, Paul (1985). The String Quartet: a History. Thames and Hudson. ISBN 0-500-27383-9.
- Kerman, Joseph (1979). The Beethoven Quartets. New York: W. W. Norton. ISBN 0-393-00909-2.
- McCalla, James (2003). Twentieth-Century Chamber Music. Routledge. ISBN 0-4159-6695-7.
- Miller, Lucy (2006). Adams to Zemlinsky. Concert Artists Guild. ISBN 1-892862-09-3.
- Norton, M. D. Herter (1925). The Art of String Quartet Playing. New York: Simon and Schuster (1962).
- Raynor, Henry (1978). Social History of Music. Boston: Taplinger Publishing. ISBN 9780800872380.
- Schoenberg, Arnold (1984). Leonard Stein (ed.). Style and Ideal: Selected Writings of Arnold Schoenberg. Berkeley and Los Angeles: University of California Press.
- Seth, Vikram (1999). An Equal Music. Vintage. ISBN 0-375-70924-X.
- Shaham, Natan (1994). The Rosendorf Quartet. Grove Press. ISBN 0-8021-3316-9.
- Solomon, Maynard (1980). Beethoven. Granada Publishing, Limited. ISBN 0-586-05189-9.
- Steinhardt, Arnold (1998). Indivisible by Four. Farrar, Straus and Giroux. ISBN 0-374-52700-8.
- Stowell, Robert, ed. (2003). The Cambridge Companion to the String Quartet. Cambridge Companions to Music. Cambridge and New York: Cambridge University Press. ISBN 0-521-80194-X.
- Swafford, Jan (1997). Johannes Brahms. Vintage Books. ISBN 0-679-74582-3.
- Ulrich, Homer (1966). Chamber Music. Columbia University Press. ISBN 0-231-08617-2.
- Winter, Robert; Martin, Robert, eds. (1994). The Beethoven Quartet Companion. Berkeley and Los Angeles: University of California Press. ISBN 0-520-20420-4.
