= Classical Revolution =

Chamber music organization

Classical Revolution is a chamber music organization known for holding performances of classical music in unusual spaces. Charith Premawardhana founded the organization in 2006 at San Francisco’s Revolution Café. As of 2013, the organization had 38 chapters in different cities in North America and Europe including London, Berlin, and Paris. The group focuses on accessibility to the audience and creating opportunities for local musicians to perform. Its tagline is "chamber music for the people".

Although there is no formal audition process, participants in Classical Revolution are typically classically-trained musicians. News of the group generally spreads by word of mouth and networking. Most of the chapters have Facebook groups or websites for organizing events, recruiting, and advertising.

Performances are in non-traditional venues such as cafés, art houses, bookstores, and even sidewalks. Performance organizers tailor programs to the venue to avoid crowding too many musicians into a small space or performing an intimate piece in an environment with loud background noise. The casual atmosphere attracts younger audiences who may not visit a symphony hall or other traditional venue. The audience may be less familiar or less careful than traditional audiences with concert etiquette. The organization also promotes open mic nights hosted by Classical Revolution New York. The overarching goal is to attract new listeners to classical music, and to involve the audiences in the experience. Although the new setting may inject more energy and enthusiasm into the performance, disadvantages to the informal atmosphere may include disorderly or noisy listeners and outside distractions from passers-by and from the venue itself.

Classical Revolution has received funding from nonprofits San Francisco Friends of Chamber Music and Fractured Atlas as well as audience donations. Nontraditional venue costs are low, so that performing musicians often split audience donations at the end of the show, much like a communal tip jar.
