= Wind Nonet (Parry) =

Hubert Parry's Wind Nonet in B♭ major for nine wind instruments is a composition for chamber ensemble composed around 1877. Not performed in the composers lifetime, it remained unpublished until 1988 when Edition Compusic published the work under the posthumous opus number 70.

Dibble notes that the first confirmed performance of the Nonet did not take place until 1937. The first recording, by the chamber ensemble Capricorn, was released by Hyperion Records in 1987.

== Background ==
The first mention of the composition is in a letter dating from Autumn of 1877 to Parry's then-teacher Edward Dannreuther where he referred to the work as "..an experiment...". Parry showed the incomplete composition to Dannreuther on December 21, 1877, but did not complete the work until December 31, 1877.

Dibble notes that Parry continued to work on the Nonet into February 1878, and suggests that the composer may have considered having members of the Crystal Palace Orchestra perform it. The reasons for the lack of performance during the composers lifetime and the decision not to publish are unclear, but may be related to the fact that the experimental nature of the work, conceived as a test of the composers ability to score for wind instruments, or the composer may have simply been dissatisfied with the work.

== Music ==
The composition is scored for flute, oboe, cor anglais, 2 clarinets, 2 horns, and 2 bassoons.

The composition is in four movements:

1. Allegro
2. Allegro molto
3. Largo
4. Allegro

A typical performance takes around 24 minutes.
