= Introdução aos Chôros =

- Abertura
- Chôros by Heitor Villa-Lobos
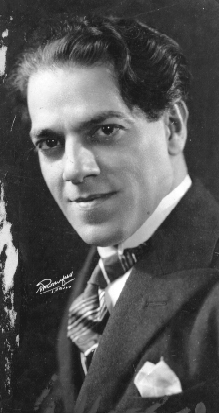
- Heitor Villa-Lobos
- English: Introduction to the Chôros: Overture
- Catalogue: W239
- Composed: 1929:
- Published: 1987
- Publisher: Max Eschig
- Duration: 13 min.
- Movements: 1
- Scoring: Orchestra, guitar solo

Premiere
- Location: Rio de Janeiro,
- Conductor: Leo Perachi
- Performers: Zé Menezes (guitar), Orchestra of the Rádio Nacional

Introdução aos Chôros: Abertura (Introduction to the Chôros: Overture), is a composition for guitar and orchestra by the Brazilian composer Heitor Villa-Lobos, composed in 1929 as an overture to precede a complete performance of his series of fourteen Chôros. A performance of just the Introdução lasts about thirteen minutes.

== History ==
According to Villa-Lobos, a complete presentation of his series of Chôros should be preceded by the Introdução aos Choros and concluded by the duet for violin and cello called Chôros bis, as a sort of encore. According to the official account, the Introdução aos Chôros was composed in Rio de Janeiro and Paris in 1929.

== Instrumentation ==
The work is scored for solo guitar (amplified) and an orchestra consisting of 2 piccolos, 2 flutes, 2 oboes, cor anglais, 2 clarinets, bass clarinet, alto saxophone, 2 bassoons, contrabassoon, 4 horns, 4 trumpets, 4 trombones, tuba, timpani, tam-tam, cymbals, xylophone, celesta, 2 harps, piano, and strings.

== Analysis ==
The work has the form and function of a traditional symphonic overture, anticipating the themes and other aspects of the music that is to follow. The main themes are drawn from the Chôros numbers 3, 6, 7, 8, 9, 10, 12, 13, and 14. The work ends with the solo guitar, against a soft and soothing background, playing a free cadenza that prepares for the following entrance of Chôros No. 1, "which is like the essence, the embryo, the psychological model that will be developed technically in the conception of all the Chôros".

== Cited sources ==
- Villa-Lobos, Heitor. 1972. "Choros: Estudo técnico, estético e psicológico", edited in 1950 by Adhemar Nóbrega. In Villa-Lobos, sua obra, second edition, 198–210. Rio de Janeiro: MEC/DAC/Museu Villa-Lobos.
- Villa-Lobos, sua obra. 2009. Version 1.0. MinC / IBRAM, and the Museu Villa-Lobos. Based on the third edition, 1989.
