= Fantasia for saxophone, three horns, and strings =

Concertante work by Heitor Villa-Lobos

Fantasia
- by Heitor Villa-Lobos
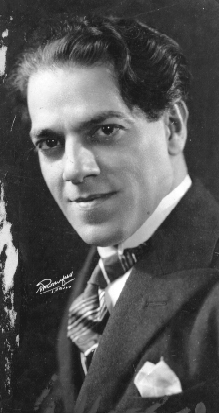
- Heitor Villa-Lobos c. 1922
- Catalogue: W. 490
- Genre: Concertante
- Form: Fantasia
- Composed: 1948: Rio de Janeiro
- Dedication: Marcel Mule
- Published: 1963: New York (reduction for saxophone and piano)
- Publisher: Southern Music
- Recorded: April 1971, Notre Dame du Liban, Paris. Eugene Rousseau, soprano saxophone; Paul Kuentz Chamber Orchestra; Paul Kuentz, cond. (issued 1972 on LP, Deutsche Grammophon 2530 209).
- Duration: 10 min
- Movements: Three
- Scoring: saxophone (soprano or tenor); 3 horns; strings

Premiere
- Date: 17 November 1951
- Location: Auditório do Palácio de Cultura, Rio de Janeiro
- Conductor: Heitor Villa-Lobos
- Performers: Waldemar Szpilman, tenor saxophone; Orquestra de Câmara do Ministério da Educação e Cultura

Fantasia for saxophone, three horns, and strings, W. 490, is a concertante work in three movements by the Brazilian composer Heitor Villa-Lobos, written in 1948. A typical performance lasts approximately ten minutes.

== History ==
=== Background ===
The saxophone features prominently throughout Villa-Lobos's compositional output. He discovered the saxophone in his youth, while playing in the street orchestras called "chorões". Amongst his friends in these circles was the saxophonist Anacleto de Medeiros and, as a clarinetist himself, Villa-Lobos occasionally performed on the saxophone also. As a composer, he frequently scored for the saxophone.

In chamber music, the most important examples include the Sexteto místico for flute, oboe, alto saxophone, harp, guitar, and celesta (1917), Quarteto simbólico for flute, alto saxophone, harp, celesta and women's voices (1921), the Nonet (1923), Chôros No. 3 and No. 7 (1925 and 1924, respectively). Orchestral compositions with prominent parts for the saxophone include Uirapuru, Bachianas Brasileiras No. 2, Chôros No. 6, No. 8, No. 10, No. 11, and No. 12, and the orchestral version of Rudepoêma. In his Fourth Symphony, Villa-Lobos calls for a quartet of saxophones.

Villa-Lobos first got to know the saxophonist Marcel Mule in Paris in the 1920s, when Mule played the saxophone part in one of Villa-Lobos's orchestral works. They got on well and performed together again on several later occasions. Villa-Lobos began composing the Fantasia in New York City in 1948 and completed it in Rio de Janeiro in November of the same year, as indicated on the first and last pages of the manuscript. It was while Villa-Lobos was in the midst of composing this work that, in September 1948, he was diagnosed with bladder cancer and underwent surgery at the Sloan-Kettering Memorial Hospital in New York.

The Fantasia is Villa-Lobos's only composition featuring the saxophone as soloist, and amounts to a small concerto in three movements. Although it was written for and dedicated to Mule, and originally specified the soprano saxophone, the instrument with which Mule was primarily associated, the Fantasia was not a commissioned work and there is no indication that the composer corresponded with the saxophonist about the piece prior to sending him the completed score in December 1948.

=== Performances ===
Mule, however, never performed the work. Although he discussed it with several conductors, none of them were interested and Mule himself said, "Somehow the piece didn't excite me at that time". Mule's lack of enthusiasm may have been partly because, in the original key of F major, the solo part extends into the altissimo register, with frequent occurrences of the (notated) high F♯ and G. Mule owned a Selmer Mark VI soprano saxophone, which does not have the keywork required to quickly and easily play in this extended range. After receiving the score, Mule wrote to Villa-Lobos, observing that "the high F♯ and G are very difficult to play on the soprano."

In the face of Mule's disinclination to play the work, Villa-Lobos turned to the Brazilian saxophonist Waldemar Szpilman (bandleader and cousin of the pianist Władysław Szpilman, the central figure in Roman Polanski's film The Pianist). Szpilman, however, did not own a soprano saxophone, which was the instrument specified by Villa-Lobos, and, like Mule, found the highest notes too risky. Consequently, the composer decided to transpose the piece a tone lower, to E♭, and to permit the tenor saxophone as an alternative to the soprano. It was during the transposition that a number of editing errors were introduced in the score. The first performance took place on 17 November 1951 in the Auditório do Palacio da Cultura, Ministério da Educação e Cultura, Rio de Janeiro, with Waldemar Szpilman, tenor saxophone, and the Orquestra de Câmera do Ministério da Educação e Cultura, conducted by the composer.

Fifteen days after the premiere, Villa-Lobos's close friend, the pianist José Vieira Brandão, presented the composer with a piano reduction of the score. However, the composer was not entirely satisfied with this version and recast it himself, adjusting chord voicing and correcting wrong notes. This second version of the piano reduction was published in 1963 by Southern Music Publishing/Peer International in New York.

The first recording of the work was not made until 1971, by Eugene Rousseau, who reported that, at that time, it did not appear that the orchestral parts had ever been played.

With the composer's authorization, the flautist Sebastião Vianna (1916–2009) made a version for flute and orchestra, transposed upward to G major. Although Vianna tried out this version in rehearsal in 1979 with the Chamber Orchestra of the Conservatório de Música da Universidade Federal de Minas Gerais (where he taught flute), he never performed it publicly. In 2011 his former pupil, Fernando Pacífico Homem, announced his intention to premiere the flute version in the near future.

== Analysis ==
The Fantasia is in three movements:

1. Animé
2. Lent
3. Très animé

"Nationalistic musical elements of Brazil highlight this work, through the use of characteristic rhythmic figures, and through the use of certain melodic treatments".

The first movement is characterised rhythmically by the use of polydivisions of the basic 3/2 metre. Formally, it is cast in a pattern of ABCBC-coda:

- A is a lively and brilliant introduction in Latin rhythms.
- B has a melodic, lullaby-like theme where the marking "moins" (less) seems to apply not only to the tempo, but also to nuances and character.
- C returns to a light and energetic character, but without returning to the tempo of the beginning

The second movement prominently displays an "altered Lydian-Mixolydian scale", with a major third, augmented fourth, minor sixth and minor seventh scale degrees: E♭–F–G–A–B♭–C♭–D♭–E♭.

The finale is in tripartite (ABA) form, with the outer sections in 7/4 and the central section in 4/4.
