= Septet =

Musical group that consists of seven people

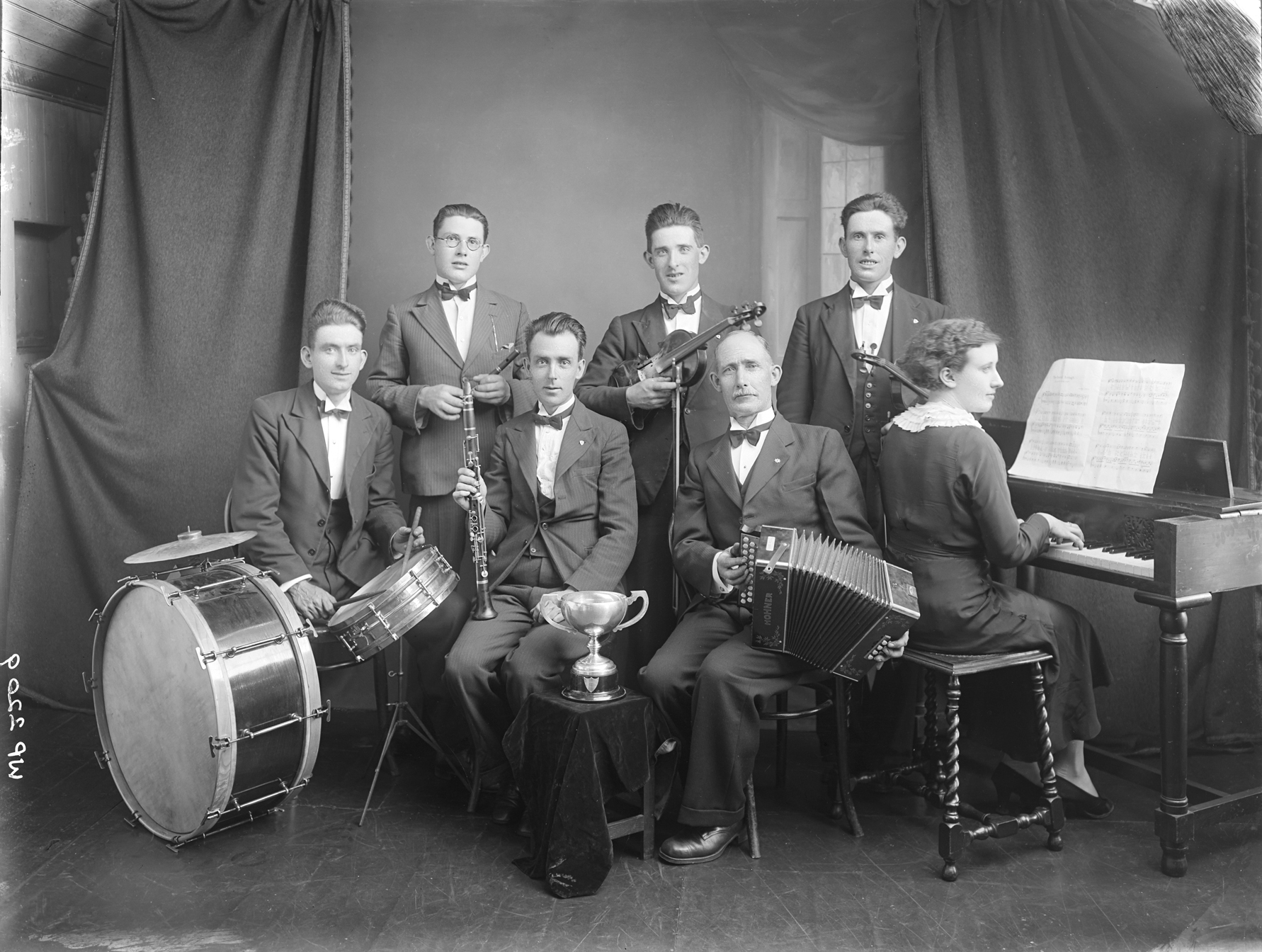
Group portrait of septet of jazz musicians with instruments and trophy, ca. 1920

A septet is a formation containing exactly seven members. It is commonly associated with musical groups but can be applied to any situation where seven similar or related objects are considered a single unit, such as a seven-line stanza of poetry.

== Classical and romantic period ==
One of the most famous classical septets is Beethoven's Septet in E♭ major, Op. 20, composed around 1799–1800, for clarinet, bassoon, horn, violin, viola, cello, and double bass. The popularity of Beethoven's septet made its combination of instruments a standard for subsequent composers, including Conradin Kreutzer (Op. 62, 1822), Franz Berwald, and Adolphe Blanc (Op. 40, ca. 1864), and, with small changes in the instrumentation, Franz Lachner (1824; violin, viola, violoncello, contrabass, flute, clarinet, horn), and Max Bruch (1849; No Opus; Clarinet, Horn, Bassoon, two Violins, Cello and Contrabass). When Franz Schubert added a second violin in 1824 for his Octet, he created a standard octet that influenced many other subsequent composers (Kube 2001). Camille Saint-Saëns's Septet in E♭ major, Op. 65 (1881) is for trumpet, piano, string quartet, and double bass. The English composer Percy Hilder Miles composed his "Jupiter" Septet in Eb (1897) for the same forces as the Beethoven.

== 20th century ==
The modern composer Bohuslav Martinů wrote three septets: a group of six dances called Les Rondes for oboe, clarinet, bassoon, trumpet, two violins, and piano (1930); a piece called Serenade No. 3 for oboe, clarinet, four violins, and cello (1932); and Fantasie for theremin, oboe, piano, and string quartet (1944). Darius Milhaud composed a string septet in 1964 for string sextet and double bass. Paul Hindemith composed a wind septet in 1948 for flute, oboe, clarinet, bass clarinet, bassoon, horn, and trumpet. Hanns Eisler composed two septets, both scored for flute, clarinet, bassoon, and string quartet: Septet No. 1 Op. 92a ("Variations on American Children's Songs") (1941), and Septet No. 2 ("Circus") (1947), after Chaplin’s 1928 movie The Circus. Two component works in the series of Chôros by the Brazilian composer Heitor Villa-Lobos are scored for seven instruments: No. 3 (1925), subtitled "Pica-páo" (Woodpecker), is for clarinet, bassoon, saxophone, 3 horns, and trombone (or for male chorus, or for both together), and No. 7 (1924), actually subtitled "Septet", is for flute, oboe, clarinet, saxophone, bassoon, violin, and cello (with tam-tam ad lib.).

There are some 20th-century works for seven instruments for which it is difficult to be certain that the term "septet" should be extended, if they are not obviously chamber music and may have titles pointing in other directions. Examples include Maurice Ravel's Introduction and Allegro (1905), Rudi Stephan's Music for Seven String Instruments (1911), Leoš Janáček's Concertino (1925), Arnold Schoenberg's Suite, Op. 29 (1925–26), Isang Yun's Music for Seven Instruments (1959), Aribert Reimann's Reflexionen (1966), and Dieter Schnebel's In motu proprio canon for seven instruments of the same kind (1975) (Kube 2001). John Adams wrote his string septet, Shaker Loops, in 1978.

Jehan Alain composed the Messe modale en septuor in 1938 for seven parts, soprano, alto, flute and string quartet.

== Popular music ==
BTS, one of the most popular K-pop groups from Seoul, South Korea is an example of a septet. For most of their existence, S Club 7 were another popular septet.
