= Chôros No. 4 =

- Chôros by Heitor Villa-Lobos
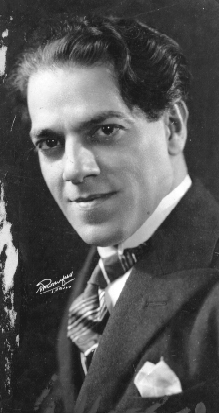
- Heitor Villa-Lobos
- Catalogue: W218
- Composed: 1926: Rio de Janeiro
- Dedication: Carlos Guinle
- Published: 1928: Paris
- Publisher: Max Eschig
- Recorded: 30 November 1949 Alfred Braim, Sinclair Lott, Richard Parissi (horns), Harold Diner (trombone) (LP, 12 in., monaural, Capitol P 8147, Hollywood: Capitol Records, issued 1954)
- Duration: 5.5 mins.
- Scoring: 3 horns; trombone

Premiere
- Date: 24 October 1927
- Location: Salle Gaveau, Paris
- Performers: Edmond Entraigue, Jean-Lazare Pénable, and Mr. Marquette, horns; Jules Dervaux, trombone

Chôros No. 4 is a quartet for three horns and trombone, written in 1926 by the Brazilian composer Heitor Villa-Lobos. It forms a part of a series of fourteen numbered compositions collectively titled Chôros, ranging from solos for guitar and for piano up to works scored for soloist or chorus with orchestra or multiple orchestras, and in duration up to over an hour. Chôros No. 4 is one of the shorter members of the series, a performance lasting about five-and-a-half minutes.

== History ==
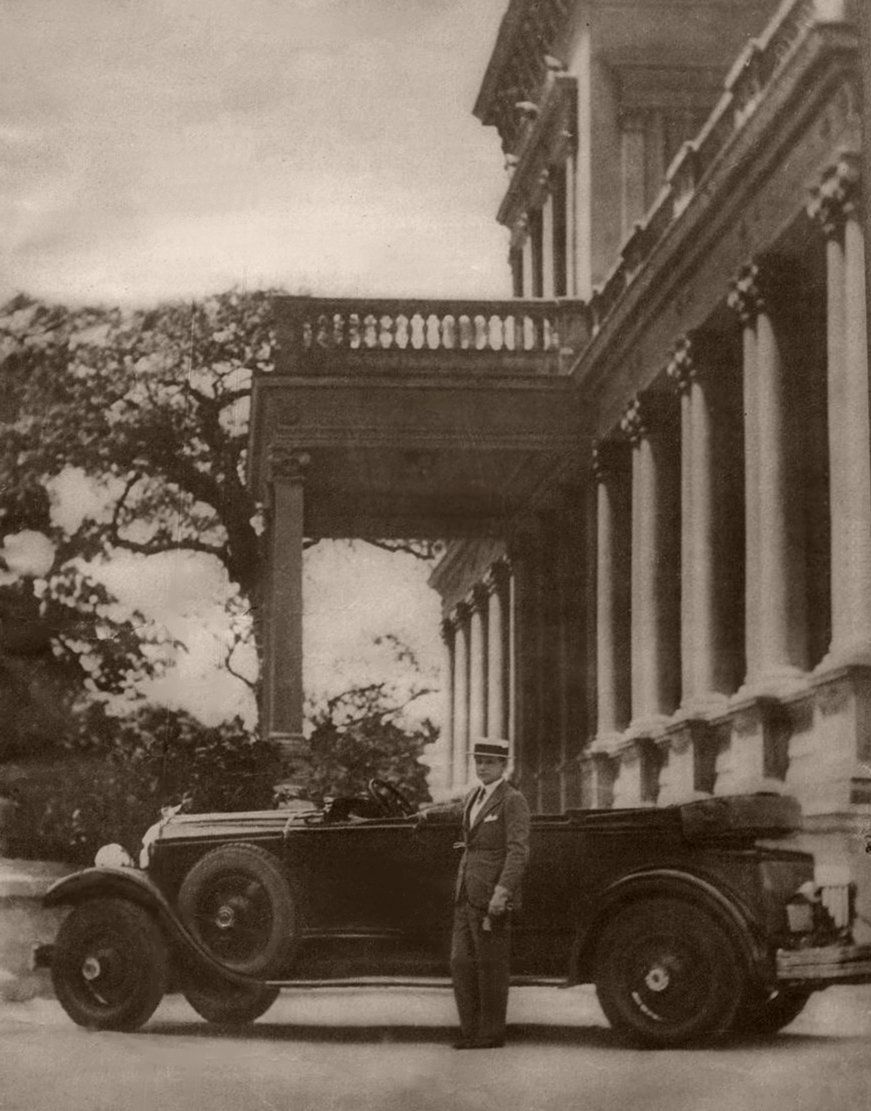
Carlos Guinle, dedicatee of Choros No. 4, in 1928

Chôros No. 4 was composed in Rio de Janeiro in 1926, and was premiered on 24 October 1927 at the Salle Gaveau in Paris, in the first of a pair of concerts devoted to works by Villa-Lobos. The performers were Edmond Entraigue, Jean-Lazare Pénable, and Mr. Marquette, horns; Jules Dervaux, trombone. On the same programme, Arthur Rubinstein gave the premiere of Rudepoêma. The first North American performance took place on 16 October 1940 at the Museum of Modern Art in New York City. The score is dedicated to Villa-Lobos's patron Carlos Guinle, the brother of the dedicatee of Chôros No. 5.

== Analysis ==
When an American University professor wrote to Villa-Lobos requesting an analysis of Chôros No. 4, the composer responded: "My works are meant to be played, not analysed".

The work is in three parts, subdivided into nine sections. The first part comprises subsections 1–6, the second part is an undivided, slow "cradle song" (subsection seven), and the last part consists of subsections 8 and 9. The third, concluding part is contrasted to everything that precedes it, and is closer to jazz or Cuban music than to anything Brazilian.

According to another opinion, the work actually falls into two sections, forming an AB form structurally analogous to Chôros No. 10, in which the second part is distinguished by the character of popular music.
