= Chôros No. 2 =

- Chôros by Heitor Villa-Lobos
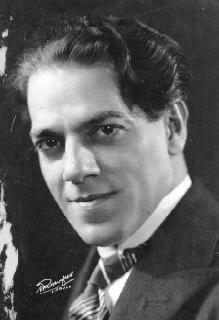
- Heitor Villa-Lobos
- Catalogue: W197 (piano version W198)
- Composed: 1924: Rio de Janeiro
- Dedication: Mário de Andrade
- Published: 1927: Paris
- Publisher: Max Eschig
- Recorded: 1941 Ary Ferreira (flute), Antão Soares (clarinet) (on side 2 of one 12-inch 78rpm monaural disc, RCA Victor Brasileira 12204 [matrix numbers RC-33402-1/RC-33444-2])
- Duration: 2.5 mins.
- Scoring: flute; clarinet

Premiere
- Date: 18 February 1925
- Location: Teatro Sant'Anna, São Paulo
- Performers: Spartaco Rossi (flute), Antenor Driussi (clarinet)

Chôros No. 2 is a duet for flute and clarinet written in 1924 by the Brazilian composer Heitor Villa-Lobos. It is part of a series of fourteen numbered compositions collectively titled Chôros, ranging from solos for guitar and for piano up to works scored for soloist or chorus with orchestra or multiple orchestras. and in duration up to over an hour. Chôros No. 2 is the shortest in the series, a performance lasting only about two-and-a-half minutes.

== History ==
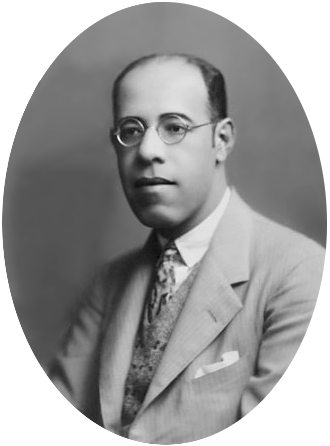
Mário de Andrade, dedicatee of Chôros No. 2, in 1928

In 1920, Villa-Lobos composed a guitar piece first titled Chôro típico, and slightly later republished as Chôro típico brasileiro, taking his title from an improvisational genre of Brazilian instrumental popular music that originated in Rio de Janeiro in the nineteenth century. The Portuguese word choro (pronounced [ˈʃoɾu]), means "cry" or "lament", though most music of this type is far from being sorrowful. Four years later, at the time of his first visit to Paris, he decided to create an extended cycle of works collectively titled Chôros. The guitar composition became No. 1 in that series, and Chôros No. 2 was composed in Rio de Janeiro in 1924. The score is dedicated to Mário de Andrade.

It was premiered at the Teatro Sant'Anna in São Paulo on 18 February 1925 by Spartaco Rossi (flute), and Antenor Driussi (clarinet), as part of a concert in homage to Olívia Guedes Penteado and Paulo Prado. The European premiere was given by Gaston Blanquart (flute), and Louis Cahuzac (clarinet), at the Salle Gaveau in Paris on 24 October 1927, on the first of a pair of concerts devoted to works by Villa-Lobos. The composer transcribed the work for piano in the year in which it was composed.

== Analysis ==
The work is in a single, short movement without a definite key centre. Changing tempos articulate the movement into four sections:

1. Pouco movido (b. 1–13)
2. Muito vagaroso (b. 14–23)
3. Pouco movido – Pouco meno (b. 24–49)
4. Tempo Primo – Animando (b. 49–54)

Motivically/rhythmically, however, the first tempo section actually consists of two sections: b. 1–9, in which the clear accents of b. 3–5 give way to normal metric stresses, and b. 10–13, characterized by march-like rhythms. The overall form is similar, in miniature, to the much larger one of Chôros No. 10: The first three sections combine into a "movement" in which fragmentary motifs are presented, followed by a second "movement" in which these fragments gradually become integrated to attain a certain logical, suggestive direction.

In addition, the clarinet motif in b. 10–11 (consisting of two consecutive, chromatically descending figures, the second slightly higher than the first) is very similar to the main motif of Chôros No. 10, but this relationship is skilfully disguised by uniting it with the flute's slower figure. Harmonically, the course of the work is produced by the interaction between diatonic structures on the one hand and more complex pitch collections drawn from the chromatic, whole-tone, and octatonic scales.
