= Chôros =

Chôros is the title of a series of compositions by the Brazilian composer Heitor Villa-Lobos, composed between 1920 and 1929.

== Origin and conception ==
The word chôro (Portuguese pronunciation: [ˈʃoɾu]; nowadays spelled simply choro) is Portuguese for "weeping", "cry", and came to be the name used for music played by an ensemble of Brazilian street musicians (called chorões) using both African and European instruments, who improvise in a free and often dissonant kind of counterpoint called contracanto. In this context, the term does not refer to any definite form of composition, but rather includes a variety of Brazilian types. Villa-Lobos described the basic concept of his Chôros as a "brasilofonia"—an extension of the popular street-musicians' chôro to a pan-Brazilian synthesis of native folklore, both Indian and popular.

The tenth work in the series is for mixed choir and large orchestra, and quotes at length from a popular song, originally composed as an instrumental schottische, Yará, in 1896 by Anacleto de Medeiros. In 1907, Catulo da Paixão Cearense transformed it into a popular song by adding words to the melody, retitling it "Rasga o coração" ("Rend Your Heart"). The Villa-Lobos work bears this phrase as a subtitle.

== History ==
The series of Chôros was composed between 1920 and 1929, but the pieces were not all composed in numerical order. Sometimes, when Villa-Lobos was working on one piece in the series, an idea would occur to him for another that seemed to him to belong much further along, and so he would compose a new Chôros around that rhythm or theme and assign it a higher number, in the expectation of writing pieces to go in between. For example, whereas Chôros no. 7 was written in 1924, the Chôros 3, 4, 5, and 6 were not composed until 1925 and 1926, and the Introdução aos Chôros (Introduction to the Chôros) was written only in 1929.

== The Chôros series ==
- Introdução aos Chôros: Abertura (Introduction aux chôros: Ouverture), for guitar and orchestra (1929) [2 piccolos, 2 flutes, 2 oboes, English horn, 2 clarinets, bass clarinet, alto saxophone, 2 bassoons, contrabassoon, 4 horns, 4 trumpets, 4 trombones, tuba, timpani, tam-tam, prato, celesta, xylophone, piano, 2 harps, guitar (with microphone), violins I, violins II, viola, cellos, double basses] or [piccolo, 2 flutes, 2 oboes, English horn, 2 clarinets, bass clarinet, saxophone, 2 bassoons, contrabassoon, 4 horns, tuba, timpani, tam-tam, xylophone, celesta, 2 harps, piano, strings]
- No. 1 for guitar (1920)
- No. 2 for flute and clarinet (1924)
- No. 3 for male chorus or seven wind instruments, or both together (1925) "Pica-páo" (Woodpecker) [Male chorus (2 tenor, baritone, bass), clarinet, alto saxophone, bassoon, 3 horns, trombone]
- No. 4 for 3 horns and trombone (1926)
- No. 5 for piano (1925) "Alma brasileira" (Brazilian Soul)
- No. 6 for orchestra (1926) [piccolo, 2 flutes, 2 oboes, English horn, clarinet, bass clarinet, 2 bassoons, contrabassoon, 4 horns, 3 trumpets, 4 trombones, tuba, timpani, tam-tam, saxophone, xylophone, bells, cymbals, bass, drum, celesta, 2 harps, strings, and other percussion instruments]
- No. 7 for winds, violin, and cello (1924) "Settimino" (Septet) [flute, oboe, clarinet, alto saxophone, bassoon, tam-tam (ad lib.), violin, cello]
- No. 8 for large orchestra and 2 pianos (1925) "Dance Chôro" [piccolo, 2 flutes, 2 oboes, English horn, 4 clarinets. bass clarinet, saxophone, 2 bassoons, contrabassoon, 4 horns, 4 trumpets, 4 trombones, tuba, timpani, tam-tam, xylophone, triangle, other percussion instruments, cymbals, celesta, 2 harps, strings]
- No. 9 for orchestra (1929) [Piccolo, 2 flutes, 2 oboes, English horn, 3 clarinets, bass clarinet, 2 bassoons, contrabassoon, 4 horns, 4 trumpets, 4 trombones, tuba, timpani, tam-tam, bombo, tambor, tambor surdo, camisao (large and small), pio, triangle, reco, tartaruga, cax, cho (metal and wood), xylophone, vibraphone, celesta, 2 harps and strings]
- No. 10 for chorus and orchestra (1925) "Rasga o coração" (It Tears Your Heart) [piccolo, 2 flutes, 2 oboes, 2 clarinets, saxophone, 2 bassoons, contrabassoon, 3 horns, 2 trumpets, 2 trombones, 2 timpani, tam-tam, tambourine, tambor, caxambu, 2 puitas, surdo, drums, reco-reco (large and small), chocalhos de metal e de madeira, piano, harp, strings]
- No. 11 for piano and orchestra (1928) [piccolo, 3 flutes, 2 oboes, English horn, 2 clarinets, bass clarinet, soprano saxophone, alto saxophone, requinta, 2 bassoons, contrabassoon, 4 horns, 4 trumpets, 4 trombones, tuba, timpani, tam-tam, reco-reco, chocalhos, xylophone, bells, tambor, bombo, cymbals, tambourine, celesta, 2 harps, strings, piano]
- No. 12 for orchestra (1929) [2 piccolos, 3 flutes, 3 oboes, English horn, 3 clarinets, bass clarinet, 2 saxophones, 3 bassoons, contrabassoon, 8 horns, 4 trumpets, 4 trombones, tuba, timpani, tam-tam, cymbals, cuica, bombo, xylophone, tambor, celesta, 2 harps, piano, strings]
- No. 13 for band and 2 orchestras (1929) – score lost, except for a short-score fragment consisting of the first page of a piano reduction, held by the Museu Villa-Lobos.
- No. 14 for orchestra, band, and chorus (1928) – score lost
- Chôros bis, for violin and cello (1928–29)
