= Chôros No. 9 =

20th-century orchestral work by Heitor Villa-Lobos

- Chôros by Heitor Villa-Lobos
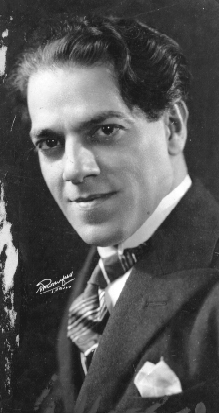
- Heitor Villa-Lobos
- Catalogue: W232
- Composed: 1929 – 1942: Rio de Janeiro
- Dedication: Arminda Neves de Almeida
- Published: 1987: Paris
- Publisher: Max Eschig
- Recorded: February 1945 Philharmonic-Symphony Orchestra of New York; Heitor Villa-Lobos, cond. (2 sound discs: analog, 33⅓ rpm, monaural, 16 in. Américas Unidas: matrix CH413 and CH416. Distributed electrical transcription recordings, with labels and announcements for Spanish-speaking audiences. Also includes Chôros No. 8.)
- Duration: 28 mins.
- Scoring: orchestra

Premiere
- Date: 24 October 1942:
- Location: Theatro Municipal, Rio de Janeiro
- Conductor: Heitor Villa-Lobos
- Performers: Orquestra Sinfônica do Theatro Municipal

Chôros No. 9 is an orchestral work written between 1929 and 1942 by the Brazilian composer Heitor Villa-Lobos. It is part of a series of fourteen numbered compositions collectively titled Chôros, ranging from solos for guitar and for piano up to works scored for soloist or chorus with orchestra or multiple orchestras, and in duration up to over an hour. A recorded performance of Chôros No. 9 made by the composer lasts almost 28 minutes.

== History ==
According to the score and the official catalog of the Museu Villa-Lobos, Chôros No. 9 was composed in Rio de Janeiro in 1929, and the score was dedicated in 1936 to Arminda Neves de Almeida. It was given its first performance on 15 July 1942 in Rio de Janeiro by the Orquestra Sinfônica do Theatro Municipal, conducted by the composer, just three days before the premiere of Chôros No. 6 in the same venue by the same forces. The American premiere was given in Carnegie Hall, New York, on 8 February 1945, by the Philharmonic-Symphony Society of New York, conducted by the composer, who also directed the Orquestra Sinfônica de Córdoba in the Argentine premiere on 12 November 1946, at the Teatro Rivera Indarte, in Córdoba.

However, Lisa Peppercorn casts doubt on such an early date of composition, based on the fact that it was Villa-Lobos's habit to secure premieres of his works as soon as they were completed. In her opinion, the delay of more than a decade between the nominal date of composition and that of the world premiere suggests that, although the score may have been begun or at least conceived in 1929, it was probably not completed until shortly before the premiere in 1942. Based on his detailed analysis of the score, Guilherme Seixas agrees with Peppercorn's hypothesis, concluding that stylistic considerations also do not support a date of completion as early as 1929.

== Instrumentation ==
Chôros No. 9 is scored for a large orchestra consisting of piccolo, 2 flutes, 2 oboes, cor anglais, 3 clarinets, bass clarinet, 2 bassoons, contrabassoon, 4 horns, 4 trumpets, 4 trombones, tuba, timpani, tam-tam, bass drum, tambor, tambor surdo, camisão (large and small), pio, triangle, reco-reco, tartaruga, caxambu, chocalho (metal and wood), xylophone, vibraphone, celesta, 2 harps, and strings.

== Analysis ==
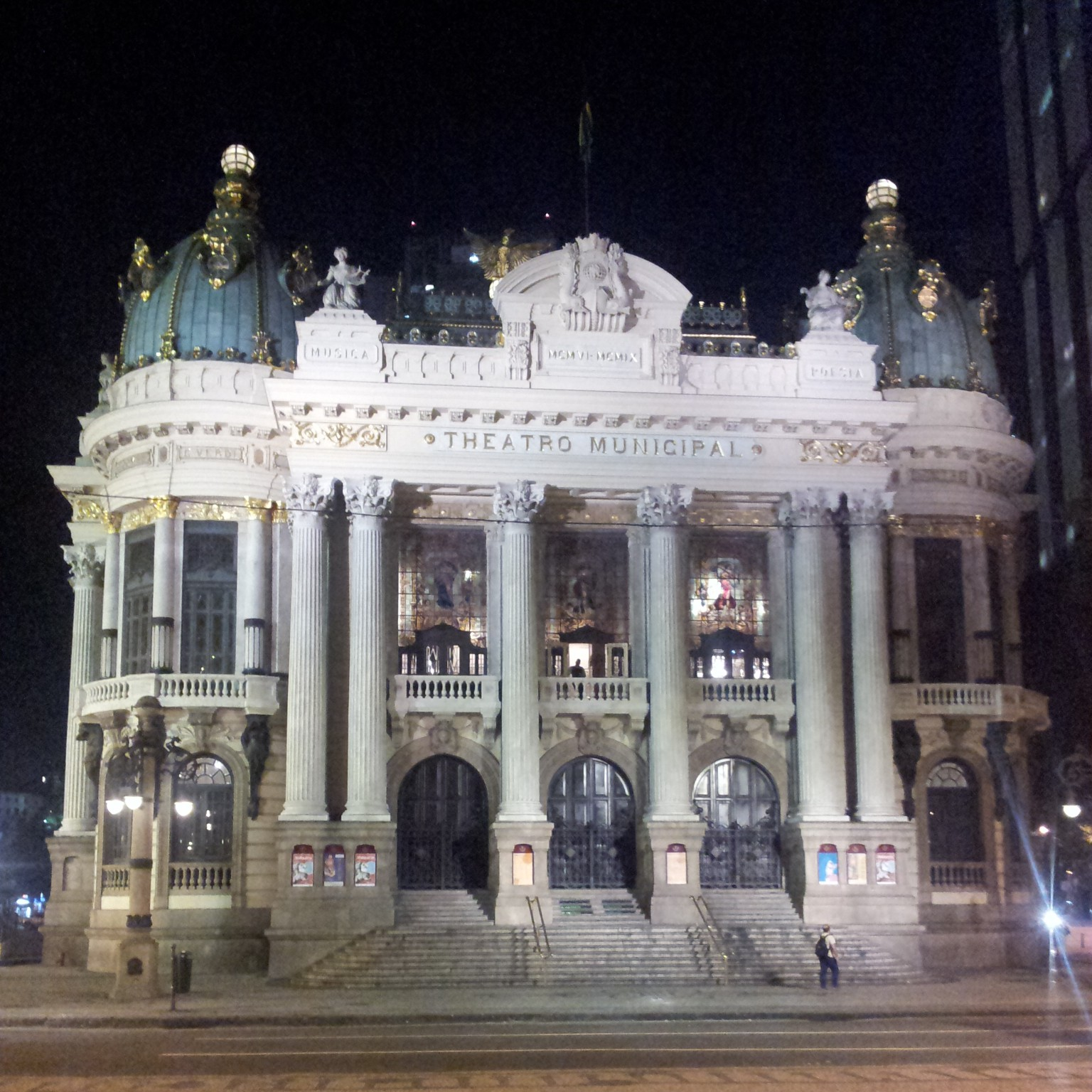
Theatro Municipal, Rio de Janeiro, where Chôros No. 9 was premiered

Chôros No. 9 is almost the twin of Chôros No. 6, with which it was concurrently composed. Both fall into clearly demarcated sections, alternating between the "manner of the Chôros", characteristic of Villa-Lobos's compositions of the 1920s, and the "manner of the Bachianas" developed in the 1930s. Shared traits include

- an abundance of short sections with an introductory or transitional function
- the use of double sections, where the theme is repeated with an augmented orchestration
- the use of contrasting materials as a marker between sections or between different motives of the same section
- large sections with various small motivic sections in sequence functioning as a tonal transition

The chief difference between them is that the thematic materials of Chôros No. 9 are relatively short, and tend to be simply repeated, while at the same time there is a complex interrelationship amongst these motives, recalling the Chôros actually composed in the 1920s. This limits the sense of tonal-thematic stability, resulting in a more rhapsodic and less balanced effect than is found in Chôros No. 6.

== Discography ==
- Villa-Lobos: Chôros Nos. 8 and 9. Hong Kong Philharmonic Orchestra, Kenneth Schermerhorn, cond. Recorded in Tsuen Wan Town Hall, Hong Kong, 31 March – 3 April 1985. LP recording, 1 disc: 12 in., 33⅓ rpm, stereo; also issued as CD recording, 1 disc: digital, 4¾ in., stereo. Records International 7002-2. Kowloon, Hong Kong: Pacific Music Co., Limited, 1985. Relabeled as Marco Polo. S.l.: Pacific Music Co., Ltd. Reissued on Naxos CD 8555241. Sl.: Naxos Records, 2001.
- Villa-Lobos: Chôros, vol. 2. São Paulo Symphony Orchestra, John Neschling, cond. BIS 1450. [Sweden]: BIS Records, 2008. Also issued as part of Villa-Lobos: Complete Chôros and Bachianas Brasileiras. 7-CD set. BIS 1830/2.
