= Chôros No. 7 =

Septet by Brazilian composer

- Chôros by Heitor Villa-Lobos
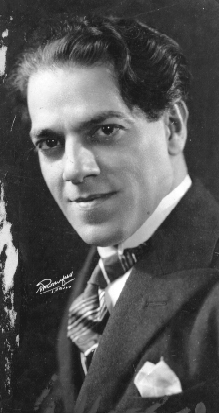
- Heitor Villa-Lobos
- Catalogue: W199
- Composed: 1924: Rio de Janeiro
- Dedication: Arnaldo Guinle
- Published: 1928: Paris
- Publisher: Max Eschig
- Recorded: 193-? Orchestra Victor Brasileira, Heitor Villa-Lobos (cond.) (one 12-inch 78rpm monaural disc, RCA Victor Brasileira 11 214)
- Duration: 8.5 mins.
- Scoring: flute; oboe; clarinet; alto saxophone; bassoon; violin; cello; (optional) tam-tam

Premiere
- Date: 19 September 1925
- Location: Escola Nacional de Música, Rio de Janeiro
- Conductor: Heitor Villa-Lobos
- Performers: Ary Ferreira (flute), Antão Soares (clarinet), Rodolfo Attanásio (oboe), Felipe Duchamps (alto saxophone), Assis Republicano (bassoon), Cardoso Menezes (violin), and Newton Pádua (cello)

Chôros No. 7, subtitled "Settimino" (Septet), is an instrumental septet written in 1924 by the Brazilian composer Heitor Villa-Lobos. It is part of a series of fourteen numbered compositions collectively titled Chôros, ranging from solos for guitar and for piano up to works scored for soloist or chorus with orchestra or multiple orchestras, and in duration up to over an hour. Chôros No. 7 is of modest length, a performance lasting about eight-and-a-half minutes.

== History ==
Chôros No. 7 was composed in Rio de Janeiro in 1924 (immediately after Chôros No. 2 and two years before the orchestral Chôros No. 6), making it the third member of the series to be written. The score is dedicated to the composer's patron Arnaldo Guinle, to whom Villa-Lobos would also dedicate Chôros No. 5. It was premiered at the Escola Nacional de Música in Rio de Janeiro on 19 September 1925 by Ary Ferreira (flute), Antão Soares (clarinet), Rodolfo Attanasio (oboe), Felipe Duchamps (alto saxophone), Assis Republicano (bassoon), Cardoso Menezes (violin), and Newton Pádua (cello). The European premiere took place on the first of a pair of concerts devoted to Villa-Lobos's work, at the Salle Gaveau in Paris on 24 October 1927. The performers were Gaston Blanquart (flute), Lucien-Joseph-Francis de Nattes (oboe), Louis Cahuzac (clarinet), Hippolyte Poimboeuf (alto saxophone), Gustave Dhérin (bassoon), Marcel Darrieux (violin), and Robert Krabansky (cello).

Chôros No. 7 was choreographed and performed as a ballet by the New York City Ballet in 1960.

== Instrumentation ==
Chôros No. 7 is scored for an instrumental septet consisting of flute, oboe, clarinet, alto saxophone, bassoon, violin, and cello, with the optional addition of an offstage tam-tam near the end.

== Analysis ==
The form of Chôros No. 7 amounts to no more than a disconnected sequence of musical segments, but in some mysterious way manages to create a sense of unity. The busy textures are woven indiscriminately from a mixture of Amerindian primitivism and the polkas and waltzes of suburban dance halls. Villa-Lobos combines and contrasts the various materials in order to produce original instrumental effects and novel timbres, favouring these to such an extent that there is virtually no thematic development at all, and the harmonies are produced more or less accidentally from the conjunction of the linear parts.

According to the composer, the opening theme's primitive, Amerindian character is gradually transformed over the course of the work into a more civilized style, eventually giving way to a slow waltz. This is succeeded by a surging melody with conflicting rhythms, ornamented with the parasitic grace notes characteristic of the animated polquinha of the cidade nova. At the end, the Amerindian theme is recalled, to confirm the transformation it has undergone..

The syncopations characteristic of the middle part of Chôros No. 7 are common to the habanera, Brazilian tangos, maxixe, and the polkas (polquinhas) of one of the originators of the choro genre, the flautist Joaquim Antônio da Silva Calado.
