= L'Ascension =

Orchestral suite by Olivier Messiaen

- Quatre méditations symphoniques pour orchestre
- Suite by Olivier Messiaen
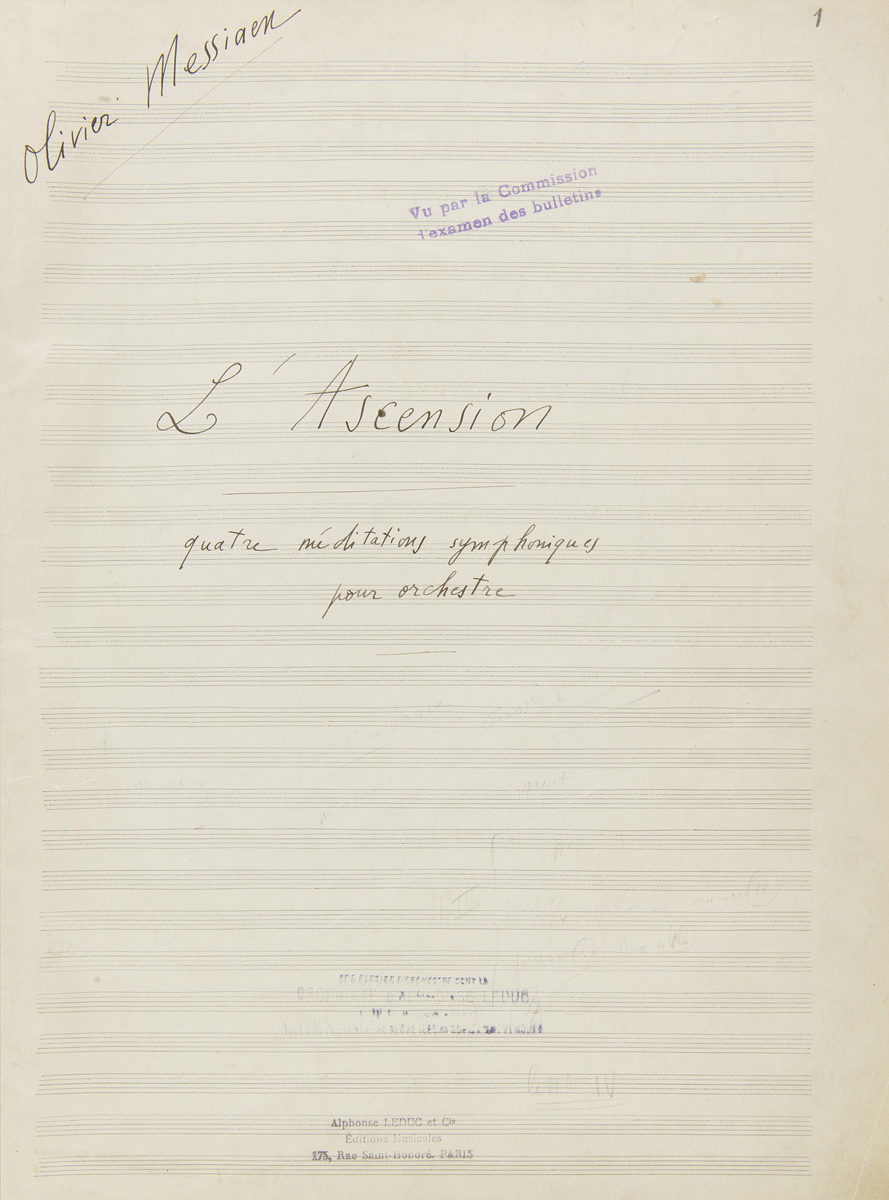
- The cover of the original manuscript of the orchestral suite.
- English: Ascension Day
- Other name: Suite for Ascension Day
- Catalogue: Simeone: I/12
- Year: 1932-1933
- Occasion: Solemnity of the Ascension of Jesus Christ
- Time: 30 minutes
- Publisher: Éditions Alphonse Leduc
- Movements: 4

L'Ascension (French pronunciation: [lasɑ̃sjɔ̃], lit. 'The Ascension'; official translation: "Ascension Day") is a suite of four symphonic meditations for orchestra that, with the exception of its third movement, were later arranged for pipe organ in 1933–1934. The work was written by the French composer Olivier Messiaen from 1932 to 1933 in Paris, Neuchâtel, and Monaco. It was premièred under the direction of Robert Siohan at the Salle Rameau in Paris on 9 February 1935. It is one of his first major works (the first such for orchestra); and, in both of its iterations, among his most well-known.

The work is in four movements and uses modes of limited transposition and complex rhythms, which are characteristic of Messiaen's compositional style. Nevertheless, the work is rooted in tonality and uses key signatures. It is as follows:

1. Majesté du Christ demandant sa gloire à son Père ("The Majesty of Christ Demanding His Glory of the Father")
2. Alléluias sereins d’une âme qui désire le ciel ("Serene Alleluias of a Soul that Longs for the Heavens")
3. Alléluia sur la trompette, alléluia sur la cymbale ("Alleluia on the Trumpet, Alleluia on the Cymbal")
4. Prière du Christ montant vers son Père ("Prayer of Christ Ascending Towards His Father")

For the organ version, in response to the fast scherzic textures of the orchestral third movement which were apparently unsuitable for the instrument, the composer gave up arranging it, replacing it with an entirely new toccata in F-sharp major titled Transports de joie d'une âme devant la gloire du Christ qui est la sienne ("Outbursts of Joy From a Soul Before the Self-Fulfilling Glory of Christ"). A complete performance takes around thirty minutes.

The second movement's main theme was originally the theme of a piece for violin and piano called Fantaisie, which was posthumously published.

Both editions were published by Éditions Alphonse Leduc.

== History ==
=== Development ===
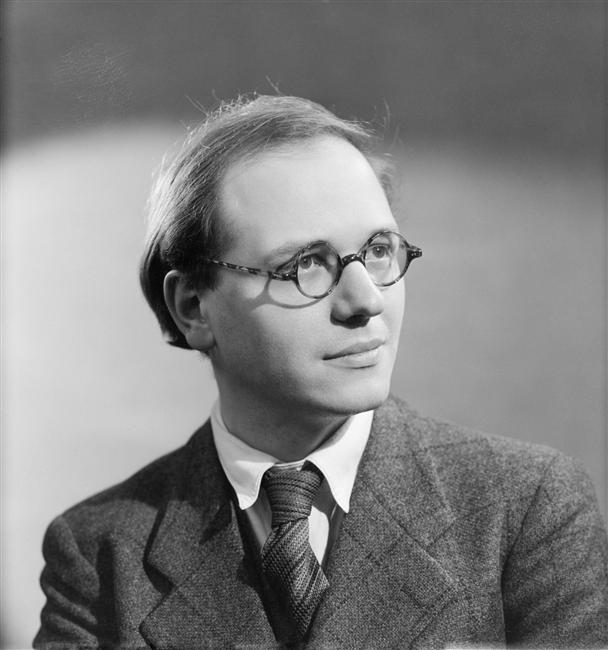
Messiaen in 1937; by Studio Harcourt

The work's earliest sketches (in short-score format) are described as dating from May of 1932 and were written in the composer's residence, 13 villa Danube in Paris. He completed the work in Neuchâtel during July of that year and began orchestrating it in July of the following year in Monaco.

At the time of writing, Messiaen had been teaching at the Schola Cantorum de Paris and had already published a handful of pieces, however, he was mostly known as an organist. He was appointed as titular organist of La Sainte-Trinité following the death of Charles Quef in 1931 and was a former pupil of Marcel Dupré, Charles-Marie Widor, and Paul Dukas.

Messiaen had previously written two un-commissioned symphonic meditations and was also working on his third, Hymne au Saint Sacrement.

==== Controversies ====
According to rumour, due to a dispute between Messiaen and the Alphonse Leduc company, Messiaen offered to arrange the work for organ mostly to appease them and to expand profits from the highly-demanding global organ scene. It was published in 1934, with the actual orchestral version following in 1948 (previously, only a copyist's hire-score was available). The organ version continues to be more popular than the orchestral original.

== Instrumentation ==
The work is scored for the following instruments:

Woodwinds

3 flutes
2 oboes
1 cor anglais
2 clarinets in A and B♭
1 bass clarinet in B♭
3 bassoons

Brass

4 horns
3 trumpets
3 trombones
1 tuba

Percussion

timpani (3)
triangle
cymbals
tambourine
bass drum

Strings

violins I, II
violas
cellos
double Basses

== Form ==
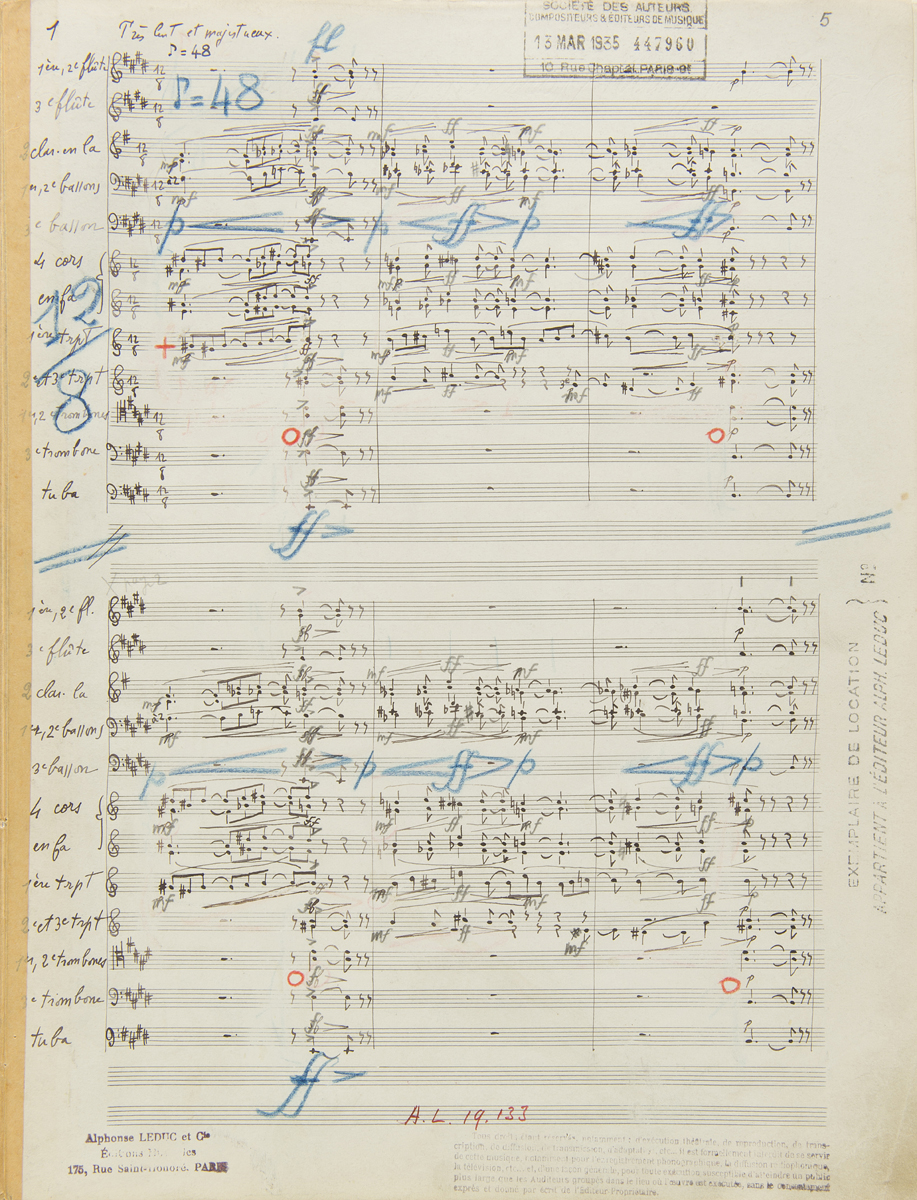
First page of the manuscript of the fair copy of the first movement

=== I. Majesté du Christ demandant sa gloire à son Père ===
Père, l'heure est venue, glorifie ton Fils, afin que ton Fils te glorifie. (Jean 17:1)

"Father, the hour has come, glorify Thy Son, so Your Son may glorify Thee. (John 17:1)"

The movement is an opening chorale in E major which is scored for the winds and brass sections alone.

== Organ version ==
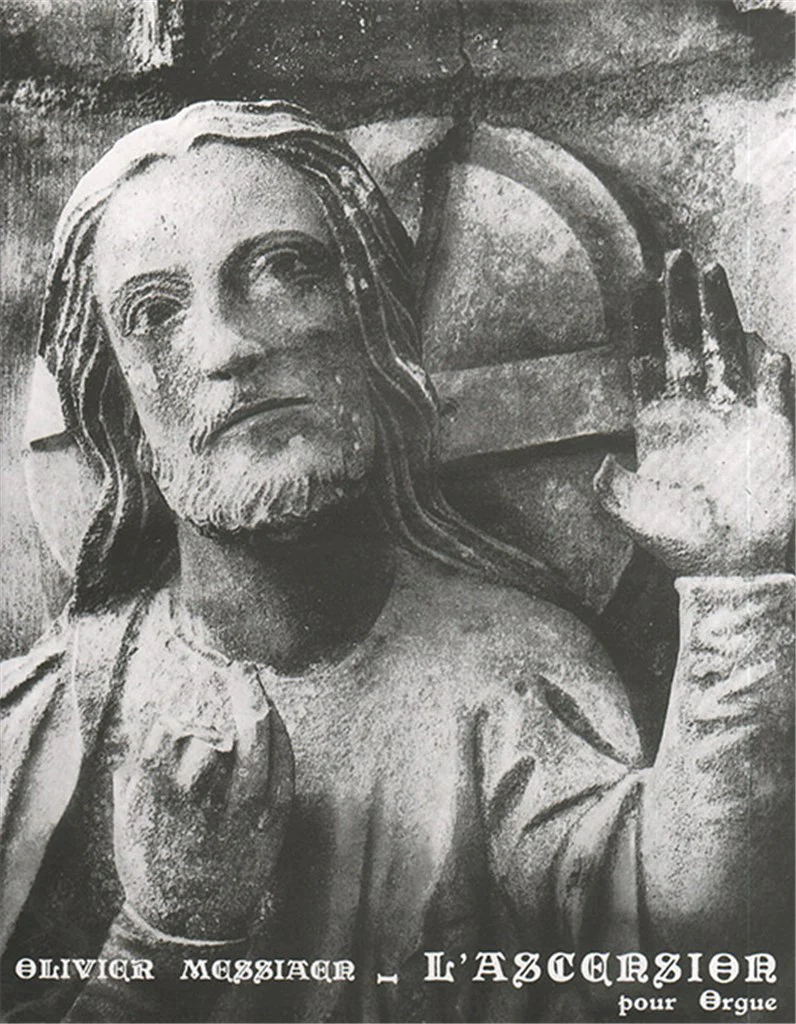
Cover of the sheet music of the organ arrangement

In 1933–34, Messiaen made a version for solo organ. The first, second and fourth movements are arrangements of the orchestral pieces, but Messiaen composed a new third movement, Transports de joie d'une âme devant la gloire du Christ qui est la sienne ("Outbursts of joy from a soul before the glory of Christ which is its own glory"), usually just known as Transports de joie.. The first performance of the organ version was given by the composer himself on January 29, 1935, at the church of Saint-Antoine-des-Quinze-Vingts in Paris.
