= Chôros No. 5 =

- Alma Brasileira
- Chôros by Heitor Villa-Lobos
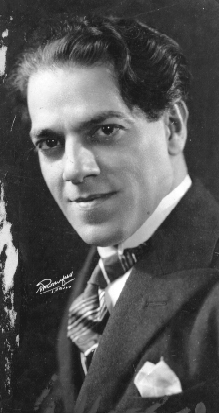
- Heitor Villa-Lobos
- English: Brazilian Soul (subtitle)
- Catalogue: W207
- Composed: 1925: Rio de Janeiro
- Dedication: Arnaldo Guinle
- Published: 1925: Rio de Janeiro
- Publisher: Casa Arthur Napoleão
- Recorded: 1939 Maria Antonia de Castro, piano (1 disc, 78 rpm 12 in., monaural, Columbia P-69601-D (matrix CPTX 359, CPTX 360), New York: Columbia Records)
- Duration: 4.5 mins.
- Scoring: piano

Chôros No. 5 ("Alma Brasileira", Brazilian Soul) is a solo piano composition written in 1925 by the Brazilian composer Heitor Villa-Lobos. It forms a part of a series of fourteen numbered compositions collectively titled Chôros, ranging from solos for guitar and for piano up to works scored for soloist or chorus with orchestra or multiple orchestras, and in duration up to over an hour. Chôros No. 5 is one of the shorter members of the series, with a performance lasting about four-and-a-half minutes.

== History ==
Chôros No. 5 was composed in Rio de Janeiro in 1925 (the same year as Chôros No. 3, but a year before No. 4 was written), and the score is dedicated to Villa-Lobos's patron Arnaldo Guinle, the brother of the dedicatee of Chôros No. 4. The date, place, and performer of the premiere are not recorded. The score was first published ca. 1925 by Casa Arthur Napoleão in Rio de Janeiro, subsequently in 1948 by the Villa-Lobos Music Corporation, Consolidated Music Publishers, and Edward B. Marks Music Corporation in New York, and by Casa Vieira Machado in Rio de Janeiro. A corrected edition was published in 1955 by Max Eschig in Paris.

== Analysis ==
The form of Chôros No. 5 may be regarded as a simple ternary (ABA) form, or as a variation on it, in which the central, B section becomes two distinct sections (ABCA). In the latter case, the C section may be seen an expansion and development of section B, or as an entirely separate section.

The outer, A section features a device called jeitinho brasileiro (Brazilian knack, or aptitude), involving a sensuous rhythmic delay. It is produced here by overlaying two different rhythmic patterns: a quadruple-meter accompaniment of syncopated chords, and a melody that enters in the third bar in triplets with syncopation independent of the accompaniment. The opening section is repeated with an added third voice in yet another syncopated pattern. The accompanimental rhythm in the pianist's left hand is taken from the popular Brazilian dance type called maxixe, while the sentimental melody is reminiscent of the modinha.
