= Chôros No. 3 =

- Pica-pau
- Chôros by Heitor Villa-Lobos
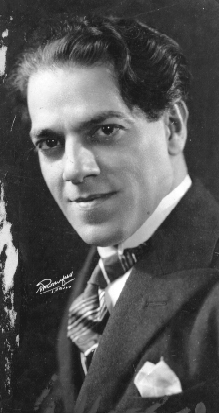
- Heitor Villa-Lobos
- English: Woodpecker
- Catalogue: W206
- Melody: "Nozani-ná", "Noal anaue", and "Ena-mô-kocê" (trad., Pareci tribe, Mato Grosso, coll. 1912 by Roquette-Pinto)
- Composed: 1924: Rio de Janeiro
- Dedication: Tarsila do Amaral and Oswald de Andrade
- Published: 1928: Paris
- Publisher: Max Eschig
- Recorded: 19?? Louis Cahuzac (clarinet), Hippolyte Poimboeuf (alto saxophone), Gustave Dhérin (bassoon), Edmond Entraigue, Jean-Lazare Pénable, and Mr. Marquette (horns), and Jules Dervaux (trombone), conducted by Robert Siohan (78rpm monaural disc, ?Disque Gramophone GW-914)
- Duration: 3.5 mins.
- Scoring: clarinet; alto saxophone; bassoon; 3 horns; trombone; four-part men's chorus (TTBB)

Premiere
- Date: 30 November 1925
- Location: Theatro Municipal, São Paulo
- Conductor: Heitor Villa-Lobos
- Performers: Antenor Driussi (clarinet), Mr. Canelle, Mr. Pierre, Martin Palka, Nicola Micelli, Paulo Alpenien, and Frederico del Ré (trombone)

Chôros No. 3, "Pica-pau" (Woodpecker) is a work for male choir or instrumental septet, or both together, written in 1925 by the Brazilian composer Heitor Villa-Lobos. It forms a part of a series of fourteen numbered compositions collectively titled Chôros, ranging from solos for guitar and for piano up to works scored for soloist or chorus with orchestra or multiple orchestras. and in duration up to over an hour. Chôros No. 3 is one of the shorter members of the series, a performance lasting about three-and-a-half minutes.

== History ==
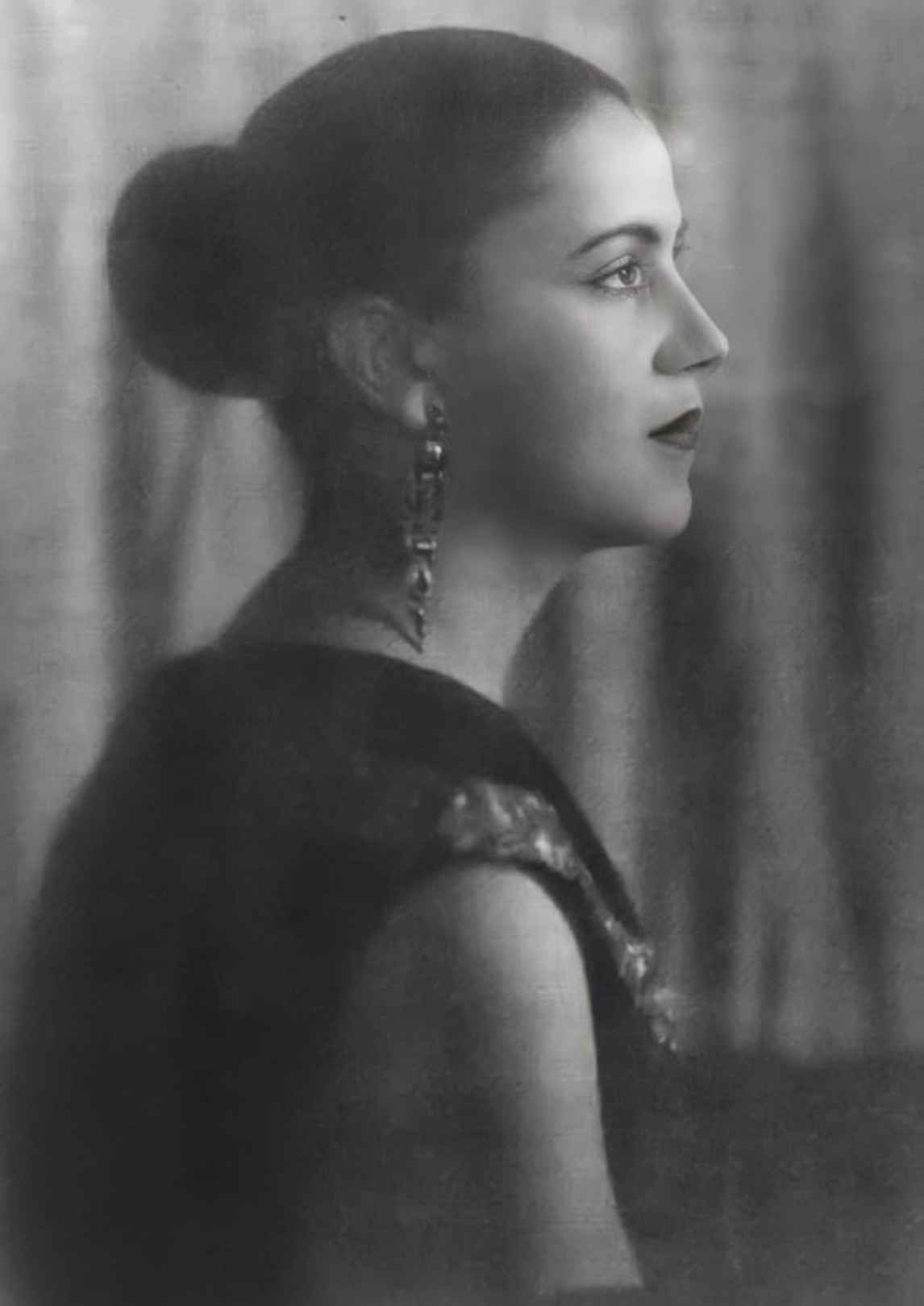
Tarsila do Amaral, ca. 1925

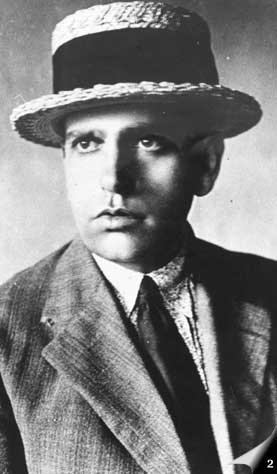
Oswald de Andrade in 1922

Chôros No. 3 was composed in São Paulo in 1925, the year after Chôros Nos. 2 and 7 were written, and the score is dedicated to the painter Tarsila do Amaral and the poet Oswald de Andrade. It was premiered 30 November 1925 at the Theatro Municipal in São Paulo by Antenor Driussi (clarinet), Canelle, Pierre, Martin Palka, Nicola Micelli, Paulo Alpenien, and Frederico del Ré (trombone), conducted by the composer. The first European performance took place on 5 December 1927 in Paris, on the second of two concerts dedicated to Villa-Lobos's music, at the Salle Gaveau. The instrumentalists were Louis Cahuzac (clarinet), Hippolyte Poimboeuf (alto saxophone), Gustave Dhérin (bassoon), Edmond Entraigue, Jean-Lazare Pénable, and Mr. Marquette (horns) and Jules Dervaux (trombone), conducted by Robert Siohan. A recording by the latter ensemble, including a male choir, appears to have been made shortly after the French premiere and released as a part of a 78 rpm disc [?Disque Gramophone] GW-914.

== Analysis ==
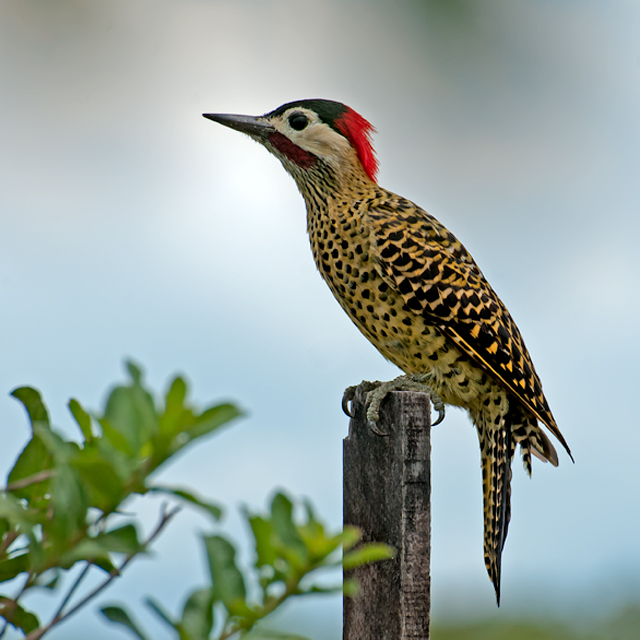
Green-barred Woodpecker—Pica-pau-carijó (Colaptes melanochloros)

Chôros No. 3 is one of the few major works in Villa-Lobos's catalogue based principally on documented Amerindian music. Its main musical subject, presented in canon or fugato at the beginning, is a feasting song of the Pareci tribe, "Nozani-ná", which had been collected in the Serra do Norte, Mato Grosso, on a cylinder recording by Edgar Roquette-Pinto in 1912. Villa-Lobos had already used a modified form of a fragment of this theme in Chôros No. 7, and had set the whole song for voice and piano as one of the ten Canções típicas brasileiras in 1919. To this are added fragments from two other Pareci songs from Roquette-Pinto's collection, "Noal anaue" and "Ena-mô-kocê". This section comes to an end with a passage of vocal glissandi, and is followed by the Indianist imitation of a woodpecker that gives the work its subtitle. However, "Nozani-ná" recurs over this ostinato, in longer note values and with some adjustment to the pitches, until the work comes to an end with a unison shout of the word "Brasil!".

Concerning the sense of the words to "Nozani-ná", opinions differ. According to one authority, "the meaning of the words is unknown, but the sound of the male voices and horns is unique". Another source asserts "the text is 'without sense or meaning imitating the Indian language'", attributing the quotation to Lisa Peppercorn's book where, however, on the very page cited, a full translation is given: "This is the hour of drinking / this is the hour of eating / we eat the Kozetozá [a maize dish] / we drink the Oloniti [wine made from maize]".
