= Chôros No. 13 =

- Chôros by Heitor Villa-Lobos
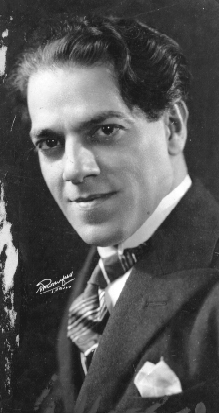
- Heitor Villa-Lobos
- Catalogue: W234
- Composed: 1929
- Published: score lost
- Scoring: Two orchestras and band

Chôros No. 13 is a work for two orchestras and band, written in 1929 by the Brazilian composer Heitor Villa-Lobos. It is part of a series of fourteen numbered compositions collectively titled Chôros, ranging from solos for guitar and for piano up to works scored for soloist or chorus with orchestra or multiple orchestras, and in duration up to over an hour. Chôros No. 13 is one of the longer compositions in the series, but has never been performed, because the full score is lost.

== History ==
According to the official catalog of the Museu Villa-Lobos, Chôros No. 13 was composed in 1929; however, the full score cannot now be located. When Villa-Lobos travelled home to Brazil in June 1930 to fulfill some conducting engagements, it was his intention to return to Paris in a few months' time. However, when the Revolution of 1930 brought Getúlio Vargas to power, it became impossible for a time to travel or make payments abroad. As a result, Villa-Lobos was unable to pay the rent on his Paris apartment and he was evicted in absentia.

A number of works of art and many manuscripts left behind were never recovered, amongst which are believed to have been the scores of Chôros No. 13 and No. 14. The first page of a piano reduction of Chôros No. 13, however, is held by the Villa-Lobos Museum, and the composer published a substantial verbal description of the entire work. Another, unpublished document containing musical examples from both Chôros No. 13 and Chôros No. 14 exists and, while Adhemar Nóbrega accepts this as evidence that this composition, as well as Chôros No. 14, were completed, Lisa Peppercorn doubts that either ever actually existed.

== Analysis ==
From the surviving short-score fragment it can be determined that Villa-Lobos conceived the work contrapuntally. The composer describes the work as "absolutely atonal … with tendencies to classicism". The work falls into four broad sections, plus a coda. The opening section constitutes a freely canonic exposition, primarily in the second, B orchestra. As this following development reaches a climax in preparation for a stretto, the band abruptly enters and transforms the character of the composition. In this second, bustling and colourful section, orchestra A deals primarily with the treble, and orchestra B with the bass, while the band occupies the middle region and prepares for its eventual dominant position amongst the three ensembles.

A third section ensues, introducing a new atmosphere of percussive sounds, including many characteristic Brazilian instruments: the camisão (a single-headed frame drum), caxambu (a double-headed barrel drum), tartaruga (a sea-turtle shell), tambu and tambi (low and high stamping tubes, also used at the outset of Chôros No. 6), and pio (a ”cheeper”). The sound of the battery gradually diminishes to link to a fourth section having the function of a recapitulation, ending with a series of stretti. The work is rounded off with a final coda, ending in a surprising pianissimo given to the string sections of the two orchestras.
