= Rudepoêma =

Composition by Heitor Villa-Lobos

- by Heitor Villa-Lobos
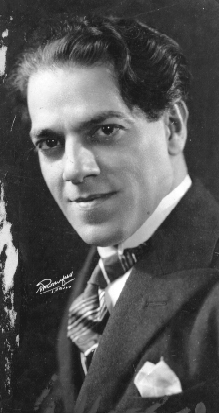
- Heitor Villa-Lobos
- English: Savage Poem
- Catalogue: W184, W310
- Genre: Solo Piano
- Composed: 1921: Rio de Janeiro
- Dedication: Arthur Rubinstein
- Published: 1928: Paris
- Publisher: Max Eschig
- Duration: 20 mins.
- Movements: 1
- Scoring: Piano solo (later transcribed for orchestra by the composer)

Premiere
- Date: 24 October 1927:
- Location: Salle Gaveau, Paris
- Performers: Arthur Rubinstein

Rudepoêma (Portuguese: [ˌʁudʒipoˈemɐ], Savage Poem) is a composition by Heitor Villa-Lobos. It was written in Rio de Janeiro from 1921 to 1926 and is the largest and most challenging work Villa-Lobos wrote for the solo piano. It is in one continuous movement and runs about 19–20 minutes. The piece has been described (with license) as "Le Sacre du printemps meets the Brazilian jungle". For the title of this work, as he also did for other compositions, such as Vidapura and Momoprecoce, Villa-Lobos compounded two words together: rude, meaning "rude", "coarse", "uncultured", "discourteous", and poema, "poem". However, the score's dedicatee, Arthur Rubinstein, explained, "The 'Rude' of the title did not have the English meaning. In Brazil it meant 'savage'. When I asked him if he considered me a savage pianist, he said excitedly, 'We are both savage! We don't care much for pedantic detail. I compose and you play, off the heart, making the music live, and this is what I hope I expressed in this work'". Rudepoêma was later orchestrated by the composer, and premiered under his baton in Rio de Janeiro on July 15, 1942.

The piece was intended as a tonal portrait of the Polish-American pianist Arthur Rubinstein, who premiered the work at the Salle Gaveau in Paris on 24 October 1927, on the first of a pair of concerts devoted to Villa-Lobos's compositions. The (Portuguese) dedication of the score to Rubinstein reads, "My true friend, I do not know if I can have fully assimilated your soul with this Rudepoema, but I swear with all my heart that I have the impression in my mind of having recorded your temperament and of having mechanically transcribed it on paper, like an intimate Kodak. Therefore, if I have succeeded, you will be the true author of this work". It is rhapsodic in style and elastic in its structure. It is filled with varied rhythms and dynamic tempo changes which are meant to portray Rubinstein's brilliant and varied personality.

The two main themes of the work are presented at the outset, the first one in the bass register in the left hand, the second answering it in the right hand. Fragments of both themes are clearly audible throughout the composition, which reaches its climax only five bars from the end, with the right hand raining four fortissimo blows on three low notes, C, B, and A.
