= Chôros No. 14 =

- Chôros by Heitor Villa-Lobos
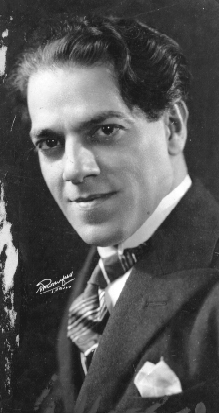
- Heitor Villa-Lobos
- Catalogue: W229
- Composed: 1928:
- Published: score lost
- Scoring: orchestra; band; choirs

Chôros No. 14 is a work for choruses, orchestra, and band, written in 1928 by the Brazilian composer Heitor Villa-Lobos. It is the last of a series of fourteen numbered compositions collectively titled Chôros, ranging from solos for guitar and for piano up to works scored for soloist or chorus with orchestra or multiple orchestras, and in duration up to over an hour. The whereabouts of the score of Chôros No. 14 is unknown.

== History ==
According to the official catalog of the Museu Villa-Lobos, Chôros No. 14 was composed in 1928, but the full score cannot now be located. When Villa-Lobos travelled home to Brazil in June 1930 to fulfill some conducting engagements, it was his intention to return to Paris in a few months' time. However, when the Revolution of 1930 brought Getúlio Vargas to power, it became impossible for a time to travel or make payments abroad. As a result, Villa-Lobos was unable to pay the rent on his Paris apartment and he was evicted in absentia. A number of works of art and many manuscripts left behind were never recovered, amongst which are believed to have been the scores of Chôros No. 13 and No. 14. The composer published a verbal description of the entire work, and another, unpublished document containing musical examples from both Chôros No. 13 and Chôros No. 14 exists. While Adhemar Nóbrega accepts this as evidence that these last two compositions in the series were completed, Lisa Peppercorn doubts either of them ever actually existed.

== Analysis ==
In contrast to the analytical description the composer provided for Chôros No. 13, his note on the Fourteenth Chôros is rather general. He describes it as being "perhaps the most adventurous of the entire series of Choros", and states it was his intention to synthesize all of the preceding works in that series. "One might expect it to represent the simplest and most accurate in technique and form, with respect to the others. On the contrary, this Choros surprises us with its harmonic and thematic complexity, verging almost on a complete and calculated cacophony." The choirs employ mainly nonsense syllables as a text, in order to contribute a colouration of onomatopoeic sounds, using the voices as if they were instruments. In addition, the voices at times "give the impression of quarter tones and a harmonious atmosphere with melodies in a sort of descant". The most arresting feature of the work is its ending where, "after a development of the last stretto performed by almost all of the instruments, a kind of canonical rondo appears and gradually each performer drops out, leaving only the first violin (as soloist) with two long double-stopped notes a minor second apart, dying slowly away until disappearing".
