= Robert Siohan =

French conductor and composer

Robert Lucien Siohan (27 February 1894 – 16 July 1985) was a French conductor and composer. Trained as a violist, he also served as choral conductor.

== Biography ==
Born in the 14th arrondissement of Paris, Siohan studied at the Conservatoire de Paris with Albert Lavignac, Georges Caussade and Charles-Marie Widor from 1909 to 1922. First Prize in viola, counterpoint and harmony, he was a violist at the Orchestre de la Société des Concerts du Conservatoire.

In 1921, he married Corrie Psichari, granddaughter of Ernest Renan and daughter of Jean Psichari.

Vincent d'Indy encouraged him to direct the orchestra, and in 1924, Siohan conducted the premiere in Paris of Le Roi David by Arthur Honegger. In 1929 he founded the "Concerts Siohan", which he conducted until 1936 and where he premiered many French contemporary works, including L'ascension by Olivier Messiaen in 1934. He was appointed choir director at the Opéra in 1932, then professor of deciphering at the Conservatoire de Paris in 1945, a position he held until 1962. Siohan defended a doctoral thesis at the Sorbonne (Théories nouvelles de l'harmonie) which was published two year later. In 1964, he was appointed Inspector General of Music. Siohan composed mainly for the orchestra, and chamber music. His style is similar to neo-classicalism.

He worked for more than half a century in the family home of his wife Corrie Renan-Psichari-Siohan, the Scheffer - Renan Hotel, in the Nouvelle Athenes district, which became the Musée de la Vie Romantique in 1987.

Robert Siohan died in the 9th arrondissement of Paris on 16 July 1985.

== Prizes ==
- Prix Halphen, 1922 (for his string quartet)
- Prix Blumenthal, 1926 (symphony, string quartet, mélodies)

== Principal works ==
- 1922: In memoriam, for orchestra
- 1922: String quartet
- 1924: Pièces, for flute solo
- 1925–1926: Symphony
- 1926: Cantique au frère soleil, mélodie for choir and orchestra
- 1926–1927: Le Baladin de satin cramoisi, opera
- 1927: Concerto for cello
- 1928: Concerto for violin
- 1938: Hypérion, choreographic symphony
- 1939: Concerto for piano
- 1945: Mallarméennes, for piano
- 1969, 1977: Quartet with piano
- 1972: Jeux phonétiques, for choir and orchestra
- 1975: Trois dialogues, for violin and piano
- 1982: Thrène

== Bibliography ==
- Siohan, Robert: Stravinsky, by Robert Sioran series Solfèges, Éditions du Seuil (1959; 1971)
- Siohan, Robert: La musique étrangère contemporaine (1954), reissued in 1984 under the title: La musique étrangère au XXe siècle
