= Chôros No. 11 =

Musical composition by Heitor Villa-Lobos

- Chôros by Heitor Villa-Lobos
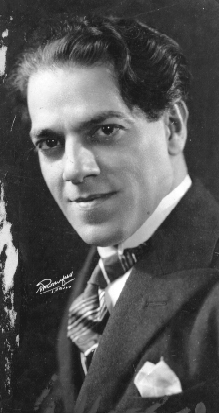
- Heitor Villa-Lobos
- Key: Polytonal
- Catalogue: W228
- Composed: 1928 – 1941: Rio de Janeiro
- Dedication: Arthur Rubinstein
- Recorded: 6, 8, and 9 May 1958 – Aline van Barentzen (piano), Orchestre national de la radiodiffusion française, Heitor Villa-Lobos (cond.) (two 12-inch monaural LPs, La voix de son maître/EMI FALP 596/597; Angel 3 CBX 440/441)
- Duration: 65 mins.
- Scoring: piano; large orchestra

Premiere
- Date: 18 July 1942
- Location: Theatro Municipal, Rio de Janeiro
- Conductor: Heitor Villa-Lobos
- Performers: José Vieira Brandão (piano), Orquestra Sinfônica do Theatro Municipal

Chôros No. 11 is a work for piano and orchestra written in 1928 by the Brazilian composer Heitor Villa-Lobos. It is part of a series of fourteen numbered compositions collectively titled Chôros, ranging from solos for guitar and for piano up to works scored for soloist or chorus with orchestra or multiple orchestras. Chôros No. 11 is the longest in the series, a performance lasting over an hour.

== History ==
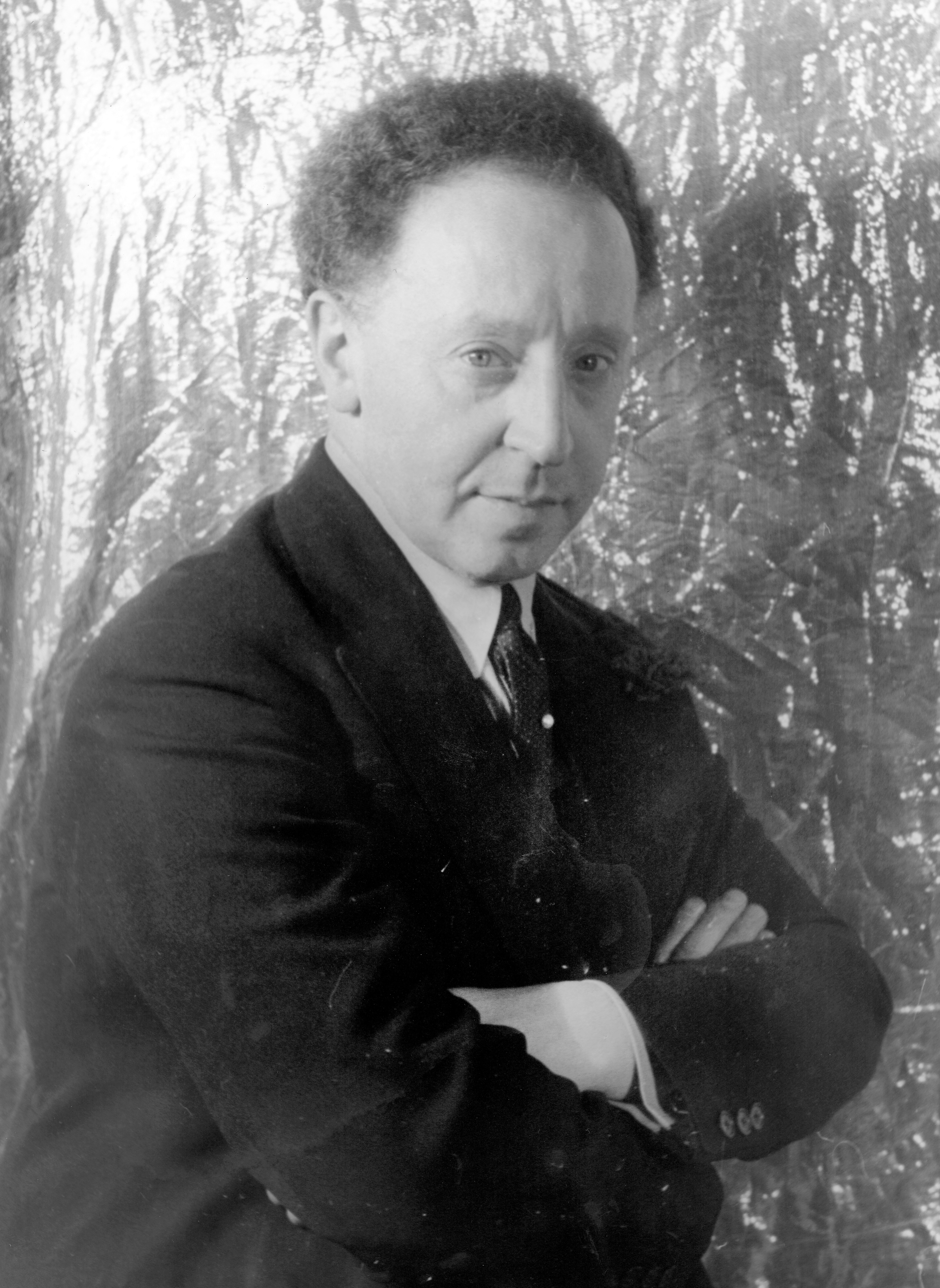
Arthur Rubinstein, dedicatee of Chôros No. 11, in 1938

According to the official account, Chôros No. 11 was composed in Rio de Janeiro in 1928, and the score is dedicated to Arthur Rubinstein. The first known performance was given on 18 July 1942 in Rio de Janeiro by José Vieira Brandão, piano, and the Orquestra Sinfônica do Theatro Municipal, conducted by the composer. However, for a variety of reasons it seems more likely that it may have begun in 1928, but was only completed in 1941, after Arthur Rubinstein had requested a piano concerto during a visit to Rio in 1939.

The only known surviving page of the original 1928 score (marked "page 8" in the margin) is reproduced in. The piano solo part is identical with the final published score, at rehearsal number 43, but there are differences in the orchestration.

Because he realised that its extraordinary length, in a single movement, would inhibit uncut performances, Villa-Lobos specified cuts that would make a shorter performing version of only about thirty-five minutes.

== Scoring ==
The work is scored for solo piano and a large orchestra consisting of 2 piccolos, 2 flutes, 2 oboes, cor anglais, E♭ clarinet, 2 clarinets in B♭, bass clarinet, soprano saxophone in B♭, alto saxophone in E♭, 2 bassoons, 2 contrabassoons, 4 horns, 4 trumpets, 4 trombones, tuba, timpani, bass drum, tam-tam, cymbals, reco-reco, chocalho, side drum, tambourine, tambor, coco, cabacinhas, caxambu, cuíca, xylophone, vibraphone, celesta, 2 harps, and strings.

== Analysis ==
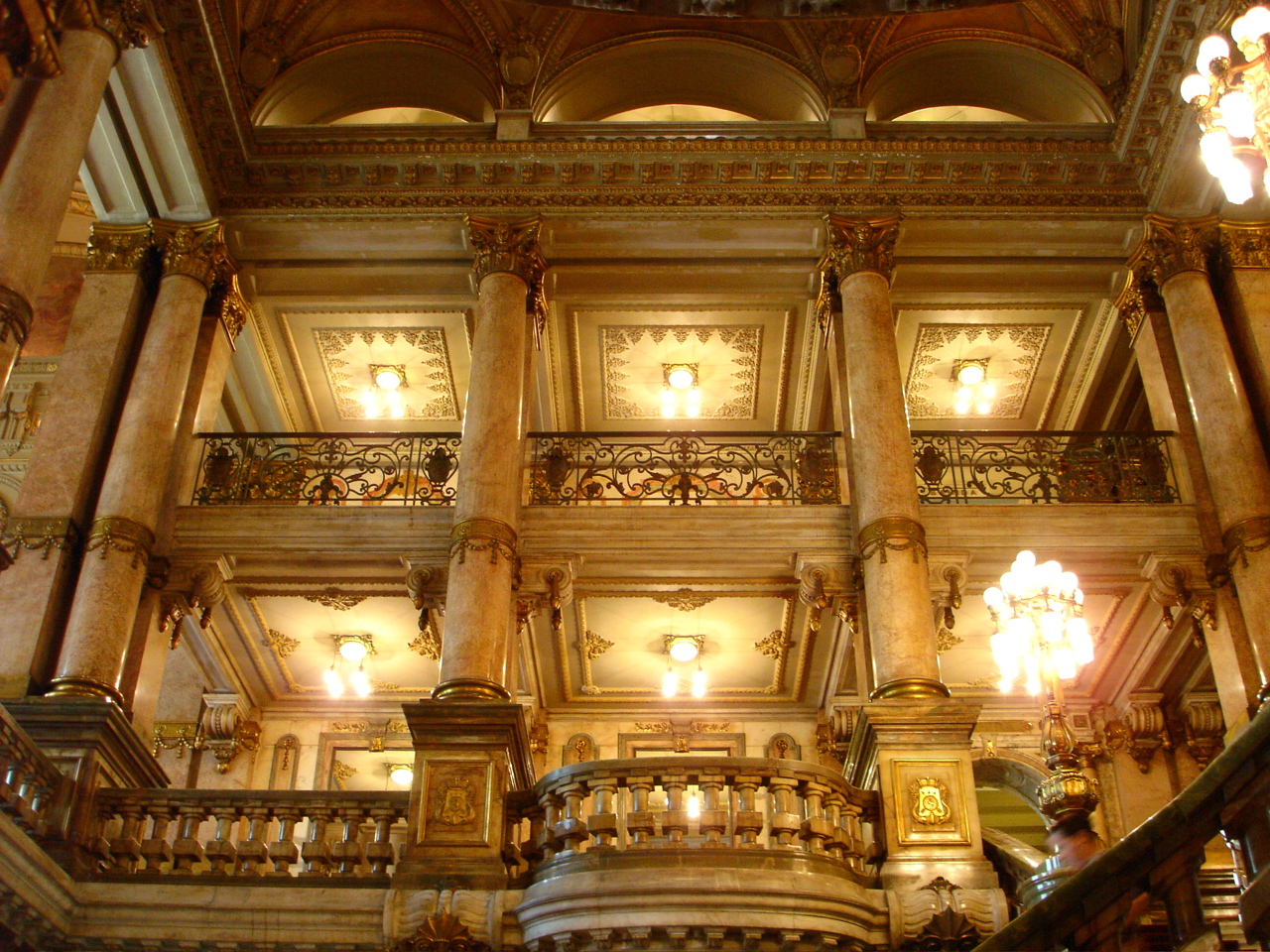
Interior of the Theatro Municipal in Rio de Janeiro, where Chôros No. 11 was premiered

The composer compares the structure of Chôros No. 11 to that of the baroque concerto grosso, because of the solo role of the piano, "whose technical virtuosity on the curious fantasy of recurring themes fully confirms the tendency of its type." However, it also takes advantage of aspects of the symphonic poem, the symphony, the classical serenade, and the fantasy, all of which contribute to explaining the extraordinary length of an hour or more in performance.

Although Chorôs No. 11 is in a single continuous movement, the long central modinha in slow tempo stands apart from the surrounding material, for its "languid, sequential, and dream-inhabited melody" clothed in "twisted and rather chilling harmony". Indeed, the work as a whole can be regarded as being in three conventional, but linked movements, though the boundary between the first and second is somewhat vague: A rhapsodic and enigmatic opening (Allegro preciso – Allegro moderato – Misterioso – Andantino – Marcha), a lyrical slow movement in two sections (Adagio), and a complex rondo finale (Allegro moderato).

Villa-Lobos calls particular attention to a number of features of the work:

1. the energetic and mechanical rhythm of the opening;
2. the melody with a primitive character (number 29)
3. that simultaneously serves as a bass for crossed arpeggios, with the same sounds of the primitive scale;
4. unforeseen and strange modulations (number 41);
5. various melodic types accompanied by unusual harmonies (number 46);
6. a sentimental melody with a simple dissonant harmony and on a vague rhythm, forming a characteristic space (number 55);
7. an unimportant melody enriched by harmony;
8. a theme of primitive form that serves as a subject for a short fugato (number 78);
9. at rehearsal number 80 appears a recapitulation, restating one of the early themes of the work a major third lower;
10. finally, a warm, passionate, and extremely vague melody appears, in the midst of contrary and syncopated harmonies and rhythms, muddying the rhythmic center of gravity.

== Discography ==
In chronological order of recording:

- Villa-Lobos: Chôros No. 11 pour piano et orchestre; Chôros No. 2 pour flûte et clarinette; Chôros No. 5 pour piano; Bachianas Brasileiras No. 1 pour ensemble de violincelles. Aline van Barentzen, piano (1st, 3rd works); Fernand Dufrene, flute, Maurice Cliquennois, clarinet (2nd work); Orchestre national de la radiodiffusion française, Heitor Villa-Lobos, conductor (1st, 4th works). Recorded at the Salle de la Mutualité, Paris, on 6, 8, and 9 May 1958 (1st work), 15 May 1958 (2nd and 3rd works), 8 and 9 April 1958 (4th work). LP recording, 2 audio discs: analog, 33⅓ rpm, 12 in., monaural. La Voix de son maître/His Master's Voice FALP 596, FALP 597. Matrix nos. 2XLA 590 21B – M6 193789 / 2XLA 591 21 – M6 193710 / 2XLA 592 21B – M6 194458 / 2XLA 593 21B – M6 193843. [France]: La voix de son maitre, 1959. Re-issued on LP as part of: Villa-Lobos par lui-même. Various performers, orchestras conducted by Heitor Villa-Lobos, plus "Qu'est-ce qu'un choros?" spoken by the composer in French. Microgroove, 11 audio discs: 10 LPs, analog, 33⅓ rpm, 12 in., monaural; 1 analog, 45 rpm, 7 in., monaural. EMI/La voix de son maître VSM 14090–99. France: La voix de Son maître, 1976. Set reissued on CD, 6 audio discs: analogue/digital, 4¾ in., monaural. EMI CZS 7 67229 2 (CDZ 7 67230 2 – CDZ 7 672135 2). France: EMI, 1991.
- Heitor Villa-Lobos: Chôros no. 11 for Piano and Orchestra. Ralf Gothóni, piano; Finnish Radio Symphony Orchestra (Radion sinfoniaorkesteri), Sakari Oramo, cond. Recorded February 1998 at the House of Culture, Helsinki. CD recording, 1 audio disc: digital, 4¾ in., stereo. Ondine ODE 916-2. Helsinki: Ondine Inc., 1998.
- Heitor Villa-Lobos: Choros, Volume 1: Nos. 11, 5, and 7. Cristina Ortiz, piano; Orquestra Sinfônica do Estado de São Paulo; John Neschling, cond. Recorded August 2004 (No. 7) and February 2006 (Nos. 5 and 11), Sala São Paulo, São Paulo, Brazil. CD recording, 1 audio disc: digital, 4¾ in., stereo. BIS-CD-1440. Åkersberga, Sweden: BIS, 2008. Reissued as disc 3 of: Villa-Lobos: The Complete Choros and Bachianas Brasileiras; Also Including the Complete Solo Guitar Music. CD recordings, 7 audio discs: digital, 4¾ in., stereo. BIS-CD-1830/32. Åkersberga, Sweden: BIS Records AB, 2009.
