= Chôros No. 12 =

Orchestral piece by Villa-Lobos

- Chôros by Heitor Villa-Lobos
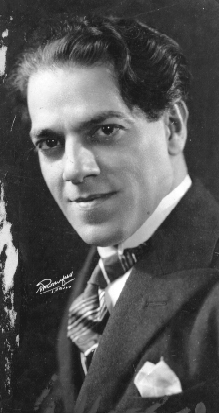
- Heitor Villa-Lobos
- Catalogue: W233
- Composed: 1925 – 1945: Rio de Janeiro
- Dedication: José Cândido de Andrade Muricy
- Published: 1986: Paris
- Publisher: Max Eschig
- Recorded: 9–10 September 1980 Orchestre Philharmonique de Liège, Pierre Bartholomée, cond. (LP recording, 1 disc: 33⅓ rpm, 12 in., stereo. Ricercar RIC-007. Gütersloh: Sonopress, issued 1980)
- Duration: 35 mins.
- Scoring: orchestra

Premiere
- Date: 23 February 1945:
- Location: Harvard University, Cambridge, MA
- Conductor: Heitor Villa-Lobos
- Performers: Boston Symphony Orchestra

Chôros No. 12 is an orchestral work written between 1925 and 1945 by the Brazilian composer Heitor Villa-Lobos. It is part of a series of fourteen numbered compositions collectively titled Chôros, ranging from solos for guitar and for piano up to works scored for soloist or chorus with orchestra or multiple orchestras, and in duration up to over an hour. Chôros No. 12 is one of the longest compositions in the series, a performance lasting about 35 minutes.

== History ==
According to the score and the official catalog of the Museu Villa-Lobos, Chôros No. 12 was composed in Rio de Janeiro in 1925, and the score is dedicated to José Cândido de Andrade Muricy. It was premiered at Harvard University by the Boston Symphony Orchestra, conducted by the composer, on 21 October 1945 according to the official catalogue of the composer's works. However, this programme was announced for 23 February of that year, and a broadcast of the work by the BSO with Villa-Lobos conducting was made on Saturday, 24 February 1945. According to contemporary reports in the Daily Boston Globe, it was performed in Cambridge on 23 February and was to have been performed two more times at Symphony Hall on 23 and 24 February. At the time of the Boston premiere, Villa-Lobos said that he had written the work "for and in admiration of Serge Koussevitzky", whose Paris concerts he had attended in the 1920s.

Other sources give 1929 as the year of composition found in the score. However, Lisa Peppercorn casts doubt on such an early date of composition, based on the fact that it was Villa-Lobos's habit to secure premieres of his works as soon as they were completed. In her opinion, the difference of two (or nearly two) decades between the nominal date of composition and that of the world premiere suggests that, although the score may have been begun or at least conceived in 1925, it was probably not completed until shortly before the premiere in 1945. Based on his detailed analysis of the score, Guilherme Seixas concludes that stylistic considerations do not support a date of completion as early as the mid-1920s, either, and agrees with Peppercorn's hypothesis

== Analysis ==
What sets this work apart from all of the preceding Chôros is its use of traditional motivic developmental techniques. The motive that first appears at rehearsal number 1, for example, is developed intervallically, tonally, melodically, and—as in some of Stravinsky's works—by variation.

Villa-Lobos here proclaims himself free of the strictly nationalist preoccupations of the preceding works in the series. Nevertheless, in the final section he draws on the esquinado, an almost forgotten Brazilian dramatic dance, and earlier on quotes a dance called charanga from the state of Espírito Santo, collected in 1912 by Santos Vieira.

== Discography ==
- Heitor Villa-Lobos: Choros XII. Orchestre Philharmonique de Liège, Pierre Bartholomée, cond. Recorded at the Conservatoire de Liège, 9–10 September 1980. LP recording, 1 disc: 33⅓ rpm, 12 in., stereo. Ricercar RIC-007. Gütersloh: Sonopress, 1980. Reissued as part of Heitor Villa-Lobos: Choros II, IV, V, VII & XII. The remaining works recorded at the Conservatoire de Liège, 22 December 1986. CD recording, 1 disc: digital, 12 cm, stereo. Ricercar RIC 007010. [France]: Lor-Disc.
- Villa-Lobos: Introdução aos Chôros; Chôros Nos. 2, 3, 10, 12; Dois Chôros (bis). Fabio Zanon, (guitar); Claudio Cruz (violin) Johannes Gramsch (cello), Elizabeth Plunk (flute), Ovanir Buosi (clarinet), Sérgio Burgani (clarinet), Marcos Pedroso (alto saxophone), Alexandre Silvério (bassoon), Dante Yenque, Luciano Amaral, and Samuel Hamzen (horns), Wagner Polistchuck (trombone), Choir of the São Paulo Symphony Orchestra, São Paulo Symphony Orchestra, John Neschling (conductor). Recorded December 2003 (no. 2) and February 2005 (remainder), Sala São Paulo, São Paulo, Brazil. CD recording, 1 disc: digital, 12 cm, stereo. BIS CD-1520. Åkersberga, Sweden: BIS Records, 2008. Reissued as disc 1 of Heitor Villa-Lobos: The Complete Choros and Bachianas Brasileiras [also including the Complete Solo Guitar Music, played by Anders Miolin]. CD recording, 7 discs: digital, 12 cm, stereo. BIS CD 1830/32. Åkersberga, Sweden: BIS Records, 2009.
