= Chôros No. 1 =

- Chôro típico
- Chôros by Heitor Villa-Lobos
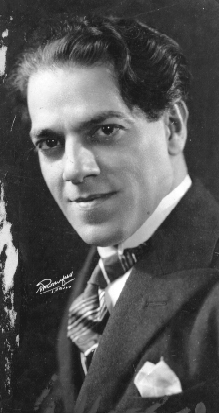
- Heitor Villa-Lobos
- English: A Typical Chôro
- Key: E minor
- Catalogue: W161
- Form: Rondo
- Composed: 1920: Rio de Janeiro
- Dedication: Ernesto Nazareth
- Published: 1920: Rio de Janeiro; second edition: 1960: Paris
- Publisher: Arthur Napoleão; Max Eschig
- Recorded: 1940 Heitor Villa-Lobos (guitar) (one monaural 78rpm disc, Victor (Brazil) 12-204)
- Duration: 4 mins.
- Scoring: guitar

Chôros No. 1 (Chôro típico brasileiro) is a 1920 composition for guitar by Brazilian composer Heitor Villa-Lobos.

== History ==
Villa-Lobos composed Chôros No. 1 in Rio de Janeiro in 1920, originally publishing it under the title Chôro típico, then Chôro típico brasileiro. The title is taken from an improvisational genre of Brazilian instrumental popular music that originated in Rio de Janeiro in the nineteenth century. The Portuguese word choro (pronounced [ˈʃoɾu]), means "cry" or "lament", though most music of this type is far from being sorrowful. Four years after composing this work, at the time of his first visit to Paris, he decided to make it part of an extended cycle of works collectively titled Chôros, which eventually included fourteen numbered compositions, plus an Introduction aux chôros (Introdução aos chôros): Ouverture, for guitar and orchestra, designed to be played before a complete performance of the cycle, and Chôros bis, a two-movement duo for violin and cello, considered as a sort of encore piece. A Quintet ("em forma de chôros"), for five woodwind instruments (1928) is sometimes considered as related.

In the context of the larger cycle, Chôros No. 1 "is like the essence, the embryo, the psychological model that will be developed technically in the conception of all the Chôros".

The score of Chôros No. 1 is dedicated to Ernesto Nazareth, and a recording of it made by the composer lasts just under four minutes. Unlike the successor works, there is no attempt here to synthesize different aspects of Brazilian music into a stylistic montage. Instead, it employs the patterns, figurations, and simple structure characteristic of the improvised music of such celebrated chorões of the late-nineteenth and early twentieth centuries as Zequinha de Abreu, Quincas Laranjeiras, Chiquinha Gonzaga, and Catulo da Paixão Cearense. This simplicity and the beauty of its composition have made it a favourite with professional guitarists.

== Analysis ==
According to the composer:

Choros No. 1 was deliberately written as if it were an instinctive production of the naive imagination of these types of popular music, in order to serve as a simple point of departure and extend proportionally, later, in form, in technique, in structure, in class, and in the psychological cases that include all these musical genres. The main theme, the harmonies and modulations, although pure invention, are shaped in the rhythmic practices and cellular melodic fragments of popular singers, guitarists, and pianists such as Sátiro Bilhar, Ernesto Nazareth, and others.

Chôros No. 1 is formally and tonally both the simplest and the most traditional of the series of Chôros, consisting of a five-part rondo in an ABACA pattern. The substance of the work draws on traditional elements of the Brazilian popular choro, including the three-note opening gesture, where each note is marked with a fermata, and a four-measure introduction.
