= Anacleto de Medeiros =

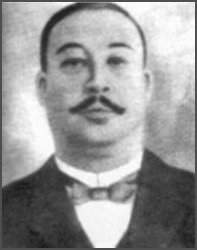
- Born: 13 July 1866; Rio de Janeiro, Empire of Brazil
- Died: 14 August 1907 (aged 41); Rio de Janeiro, Brazil
- Occupations: Musician, maestro, composer

Anacleto Augusto de Medeiros, or Anacleto de Medeiros (13 July 1866 – 14 August 1907), was a Brazilian musician, maestro, and composer who lived the entirety of his life on the island of Paquetá, part of the city of Rio de Janeiro.

== Biography ==
The son of a freed slave, Medeiros began his career in music playing the flautim with the Banda do Arsenal de Guerra in Rio de Janeiro. At 18 years old, he went to work as an typography apprentice at the Imprensa Nacional, while at the same time also matriculating at the Imperial Conservatory of Music. During this time, he had mastered all of the woodwind instruments, and had a special preference for the saxophone. He founded, along with the other typography employees, the Clube Musical Gutemberg, with this beginning his role as an organizer of musical groups.

He graduated from the Conservatory in 1886, a time in which he also organized the Sociedade Recreio Musical Paquetaense in Paquetá, his home neighborhood, and began to compose many well-known pieces. His compositions would begin to become more popular, mainly polka music, schotisch, dobrados, marchas, and valsas. Soon he found fame as a composer, and his works were soon being played by bands and musical groups throughout the country. Catulo da Paixão Cearense wrote some lyrics to his songs, such as the famous schotisch "Iara", revised in 1912 with the title "Rasga Coração".

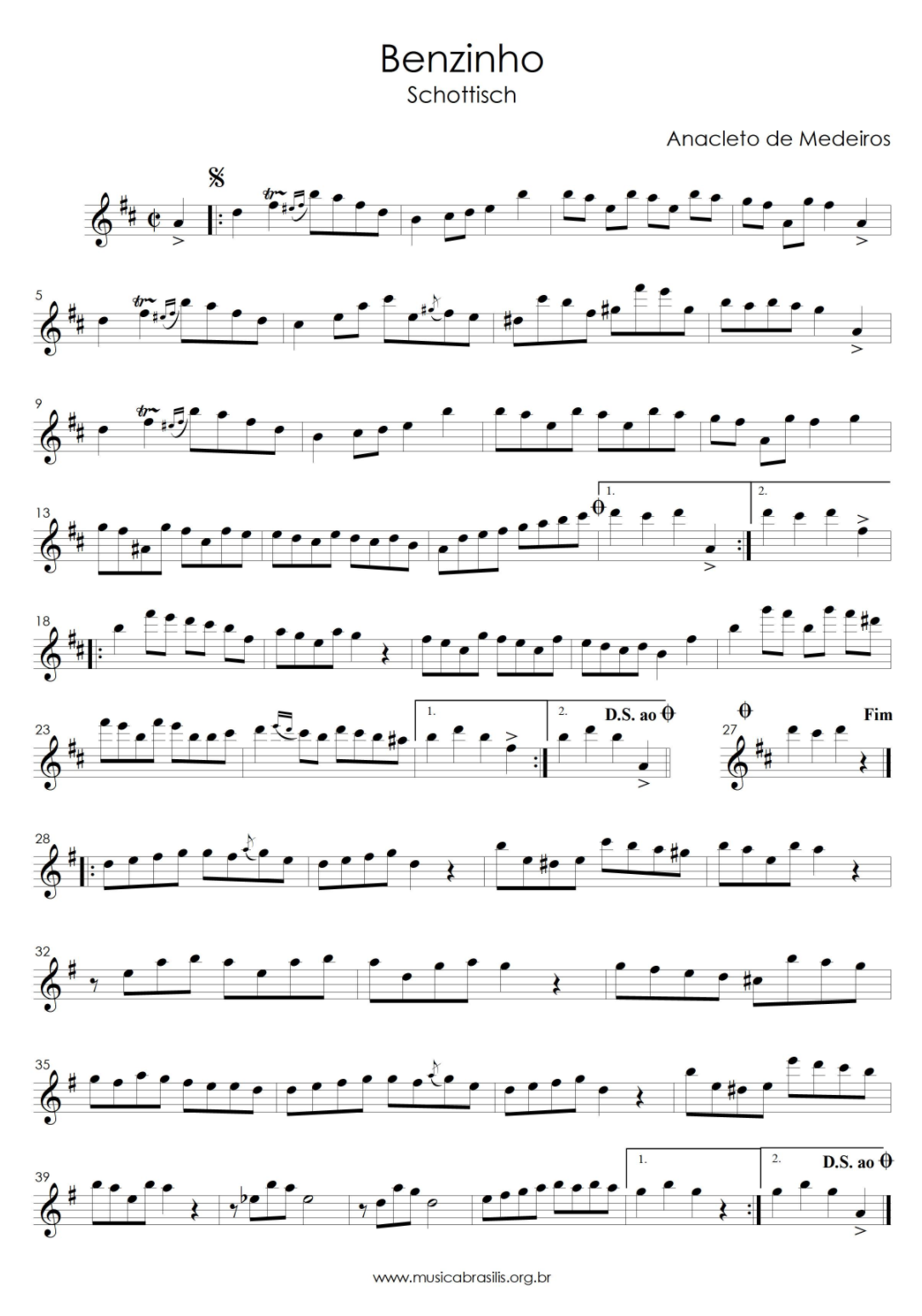
Benzinho (Anacleto de Medeiros) - First. Complete music sheet available at the Portal Musica Brasilis.

As a composer, he was one of the most expressive in Brazilian music at that time; not necessarily from the quantity of music he penned, which totaled approximately 100 songs, but mainly for what people saw as the beauty and simplicity that the compositions had. They demonstrated creativity and dominion as much as his handling of various elements of musical composition, as much as it was reflective of popular music at the time as it was erudite. These compositions affirmed his talent in musical circles in Rio de Janeiro. Other well-known compositions included "Santinha", "Três Estrelinhas", and "Não Me Olhes Assim".

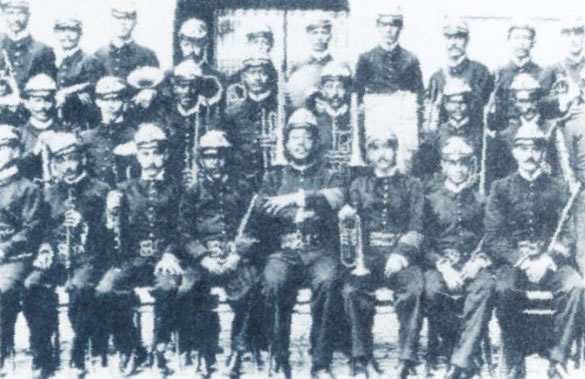
Banda do Corpo de Bombeiros, with Anacleto de Medeiros, circa 1896

Medeiros was the founder, director, and maestro of various groups, having fundamentally contributed to the fixation of this formation in Brazil. The band tradition is reflected even today, for example in the development of a solid school of wind instruments. The band that became the most famous under Medeiros' leadership was the Corpo de Bombeiros, which recorded some pioneering albums produced in Brazil during the first years of the 20th century.

== Works ==
- Açucena
- Arariboia
- As Andorinhas
- Avenida
- Benzinho (received verses from Catulo da Paixão Cearense, under the title Sentimento Oculto)
- Boêmio (received verses from Catulo da Paixão Cearense, under the title Os Boêmios)
- Bouquet
- Cabeça-de-porco
- Café Avenida
- Conde de Santo Agostinho
- Carolina
- Deliciosa (received verses from Catulo da Paixão Cearense, under the title Tu és uma flor)
- Despedida (received verses from Catulo da Paixão Cearense, under the title Serenata)
- Em ti pensando
- Enigmática
- Esperança
- Eulália
- Farrula
- Fluminense
- Iara (received verses from Catulo da Paixão Cearense, under the title Rasga o coração)
- Implorando
- Ismênia
- Jubileu
- Lídia
- Louco de amor
- Marcha fúnebre nº 1
- Marcha fúnebre nº 2
- Medrosa (received verses from Catulo da Paixão Cearense, under the title Fadário)
- Morrer sonhando
- Na volta do correio
- Não me olhes assim
- Nasci para te amar (received verses from Catulo da Paixão Cearense)
- Nenezinho e Catitinha
- No baile
- O fadário (received verses from Catulo da Paixão Cearense, under the title Sentimento Oculto)
- O teu olhar (received verses from Catulo da Paixão Cearense, under the title Sentimento Oculto)
- Olhos matadores
- Palma de martírio (received verses from Catulo da Paixão Cearense)
- Pavilhão brasileiro
- Pinheiro Freire
- Predileta (received verses from Catulo da Paixão Cearense, under the title Perdoa)
- Quiproquó
- Recordações de Lili
- Romance
- Santinha
- Segredos do coração
- Terna saudade (received verses from Catulo da Paixão Cearense, under the title Por um beijo)
- Três estrelas (received verses from Catulo da Paixão Cearense, under the title O que tu és)

== See also ==
- Choro
