= Chôros No. 10 =

Work by Brazilian composer Heitor Villa-Lobos

- Rasga o Coração
- Chôros by Heitor Villa-Lobos
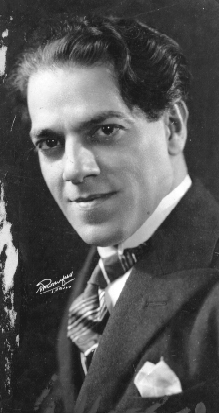
- Heitor Villa-Lobos
- English: Rend the Heart
- Key: Polytonal
- Catalogue: W209
- Text: "Rasga o Coração" (Catulo da Paixão Cearense)
- Language: Portuguese
- Melody: Birdsong (azulão da mata); "Yára" (Anacleito de Medeiros)
- Composed: 1926: Rio de Janeiro
- Dedication: Paulo Prado
- Published: 1928: Paris; second edition: 1975: Paris
- Publisher: Max Eschig
- Recorded: November 30, 1949 Werner Janssen, Janssen Symphony Orchestra, Los Angeles Oratorio Society (10-inch monaural LP, Capitol Classics L 8 043)
- Duration: 13 mins.
- Scoring: large orchestra; mixed choir

Premiere
- Date: 11 November 1926
- Location: Teatro Lírico, Rio de Janeiro
- Conductor: Heitor Villa-Lobos
- Performers: Grande Orquestra da Empresa Viggiani; Coro de artistas brasileiros; Deutscher Männerchor

Chôros No. 10 ("Rasga o Coração") is a work for chorus and orchestra written in 1926 by the Brazilian composer Heitor Villa-Lobos. It is part of a series of fourteen numbered compositions collectively titled Chôros, ranging from solos for guitar and for piano up to works scored for soloist or chorus with orchestra or multiple orchestras, and in duration up to over an hour. Chôros No. 10 is of moderate length, one performance recorded by the composer lasting just under thirteen minutes.

== History ==
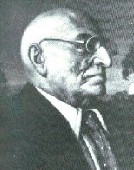
Catulo da Paixão Cearense, author of the words of "Rasga o coração"

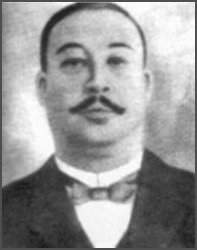
Anacleto de Medeiros, whose melody "Yára" is quoted in Chôros No. 10

Chôros No. 10 was composed in Rio de Janeiro in 1926, and the score is dedicated to |Paulo Prado. It was premiered in a concert presented in homage to the President of Brazil, Washington Luís, on 11 November 1926 at the Teatro Lírico in Rio de Janeiro by the Grande Orquestra da Empresa Viggiani, the Coro de artistas brasileiros, and the Deutscher Männerchor, conducted by the composer. This was also Villa-Lobos's farewell performance to Rio de Janeiro. The programme contained an announcement of his imminent departure for Europe. The European premiere took place in Paris on 3 December 1927 at the Salle Gaveau with the Orchestre des Concerts Colonne and L'Art Choral, once again with the composer conducting. The American premiere was given by the Philharmonic-Symphony Orchestra of New York and the Schola Cantorum, conducted by Hugh Ross, on 15 January 1930, at Carnegie Hall in New York.

Already within the composer's lifetime the work became the best-known of all the Chôros. In the second half of the work, Villa-Lobos introduces a popular melody, originally a schottische called Yára, written by Anacleto de Medeiros. In a slower tempo, sung to a poem written by Villa-Lobos's friend and former fellow chorão, Catulo da Paixão Cearense, it had become a popular song, "Rasga o coração" (Rend the Heart). It was in this form that Villa-Lobos used both the melody and the words, and he used the song's title as a subtitle for the Chôros, together with an acknowledgement, "D'après la poésie de Catullo Cearence" [sic]. The poet attended the 1926 premiere of Chôros No. 10 in the Teatro Lírico, and was overcome with emotion, embracing the composer in a gesture of gratitude. Unfortunately, in a moment of financial distress, Catulo had sold the rights of all his literary works to a man named Guimarães Martins, who evidently remained ignorant of Villa-Lobos's use of the text for nearly thirty years until by chance, at a demonstration of new gramophone players at the Ministry of Education in Rio de Janeiro, a recording of the work was used as an example. Martins initiated a breach of copyright action against Villa-Lobos, which was finally resolved only in 1956—in the composer's favour. Nevertheless, the performance of the work Villa-Lobos recorded in Paris in May 1957 substituted neutral syllables for Catulo's text, and when the publisher Max Eschig reissued the score in 1975, the text was likewise removed. Most performances since then, however, have restored the words of Catulo's poem..

== Analysis ==
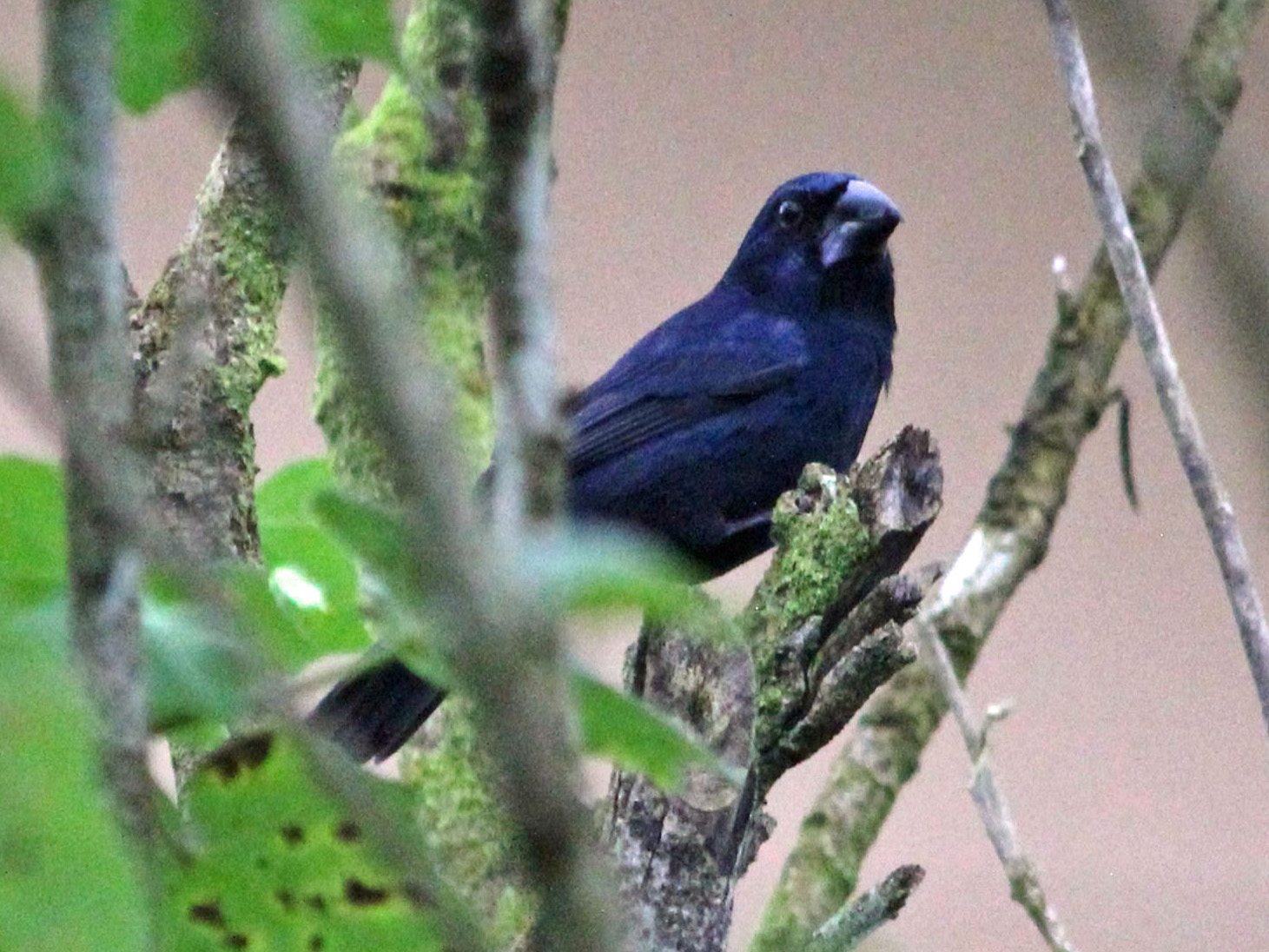
Azulão da mata (Cyanocompsa cyanoides)

Chôros No. 10 falls into two main sections, the first for orchestra alone, the second adding a mixed choir. The question of the further subdivision of part one is less certain. It can be regarded as falling into two subdivisions: a rhythmically energetic impetus (page numbers 1–18) and an impressionistic nocturne, with the tempo marking Lent (page numbers 18–35).

The composer describes Amazonian birdsong as an important source of motivic material in the opening portion of Chôros No.10. The first thematic fragment, presented in the flute in bar 3, is "a transfigured melodic cell characteristic of the song of a rare bird of the Brazilian forests, called in some places Azulão da mata"—in English called blue-black grosbeak.
