= Chôros No. 6 =

- Chôros by Heitor Villa-Lobos
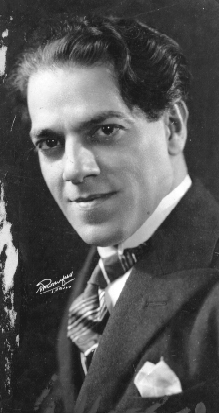
- Heitor Villa-Lobos
- Catalogue: W219
- Melody: Lundu característico (Joaquim Antônio da Silva Calado)
- Composed: 1925–1942: Rio de Janeiro
- Dedication: Arminda Neves d'Almeida
- Published: 1987: Paris
- Publisher: Max Eschig
- Recorded: January 1954 RIAS-Symphonie-Orchester, Berlin; Heitor Villa-Lobos, cond. (LP, 1 disc, 33⅓ rpm 12 in., monaural, Remington R-199-207 (New York: Remington, issued 1956)
- Duration: 25 mins.
- Scoring: orchestra

Premiere
- Date: 18 July 1942:
- Location: Theatro Municipal, Rio de Janeiro
- Conductor: Heitor Villa-Lobos
- Performers: Orquestra Sinfônica do Theatro Municipal

Chôros No. 6 is an orchestral work written between 1925 and 1942 by the Brazilian composer Heitor Villa-Lobos. It is part of a series of fourteen numbered compositions collectively titled Chôros, ranging from solos for guitar and for piano up to works scored for soloist or chorus with orchestra or multiple orchestras, and in duration up to over an hour. Chôros No. 6 is one of the longer compositions in the series, lasting about 25 minutes in performance.

== History ==
According to the score and the official catalog of the Museu Villa-Lobos, Chôros No. 6 was composed in Rio de Janeiro in 1926, and the score was dedicated to Arminda Neves d'Almeida, in 1936. It was premiered in Rio de Janeiro on 18 July 1942 by the Orquestra Sinfônica do Theatro Municipal, conducted by the composer. However, Lisa Peppercorn casts doubt on the date of composition, based on the fact that it was Villa-Lobos's habit to secure premieres of his works as soon as they were completed. In her opinion, the delay between the nominal date of composition and that of the world premiere suggests that, although the score may have been begun or at least conceived in 1926, it was probably not completed until shortly before the premiere in 1942. Based on his detailed analysis of the score, Guilherme Seixas concludes that stylistic considerations do not support a date of completion as early as the mid-1920s, and agrees with Peppercorn's hypothesis.

In a 1929 article, Suzanne Demarquez reported that Villa-Lobos had described Chôros No. 6 to her as a chamber-music composition, scored for "un curieux ensemble de petite clarinette, trompette, bombardine et guitar" (a strange ensemble of E-flat clarinet, trumpet, euphonium, and guitar), which is completely at odds with the large-scale orchestral composition finally unveiled in 1942.

== Instrumentation ==
Chôros No. 6 is scored for an orchestra consisting of 2 piccolos, 2 flutes, 2 oboes, cor anglais, 2 clarinets, bass clarinet, soprano saxophone, 2 bassoons, contrabassoon, 4 horns, 4 trumpets, 4 trombones, tuba, timpani, percussion (bass drum, tam-tam, surdo, camisão (small and large), snare drum, coco, roncador, tamborim de samba, tambu-tambi, suspended cymbal with metal beater, cuíca, reco-reco, xylophone, glockenspiel) celesta, 2 harps, and strings.

== Analysis ==
The composer describes the general harmonic atmosphere of the work as having

a kind of romance of the backcountry atmosphere of northeastern Brazil. The climate, color, temperature, light, chirping of birds, the scent of honeyed grass between the hen-houses, and all elements of nature of a hinterland served as inspiration for motives in this work; however, it does not represent any objective aspect nor a descriptive flavor.

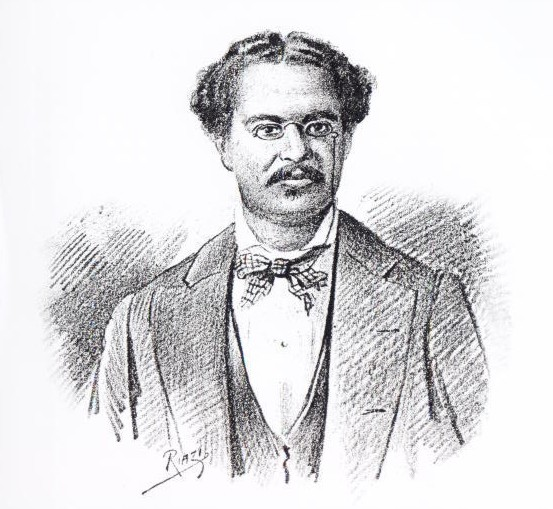
Joaquim Antônio da Silva Calado, whose melody opens Chôros No. 6

The opening melody, played by a flute (one of the most typical instruments of the improvising choro ensembles) is a seresteiro theme, sharply contrasting with the polytonal harmonic environment, which "leads us to hazy stopping points of simultaneous sounds among the forests of the Amazon valley". This melody, which enters over the soft sounds of Brazilian percussion instruments and strings, is a slightly altered quotation of Lundu característico by the flautist and band-leader Joaquim Antônio da Silva Calado, who was one of the founders of the popular choro genre in the late nineteenth century. The alterations, however, make it also similar to a popular melody called O Nó (The Knot), by the trombonist Cândido Pereira da Silva, nicknamed "Candinho Trombone". The flute is shortly joined by a saxophone, and the conclusion of their duet marks the end of the first section.

The form of Chôros No. 6 unfolds as a series of episodic sections, which are "clear and contrasting in tempo". However, there is some disagreement about their number and interrelationship. Adhemar Nóbrega describes six sections, while Eero Tarasti finds there are no fewer than sixteen sections. More recently, Guilherme Seixas proposes nine sections, some of which are subdivided.

== Discography ==
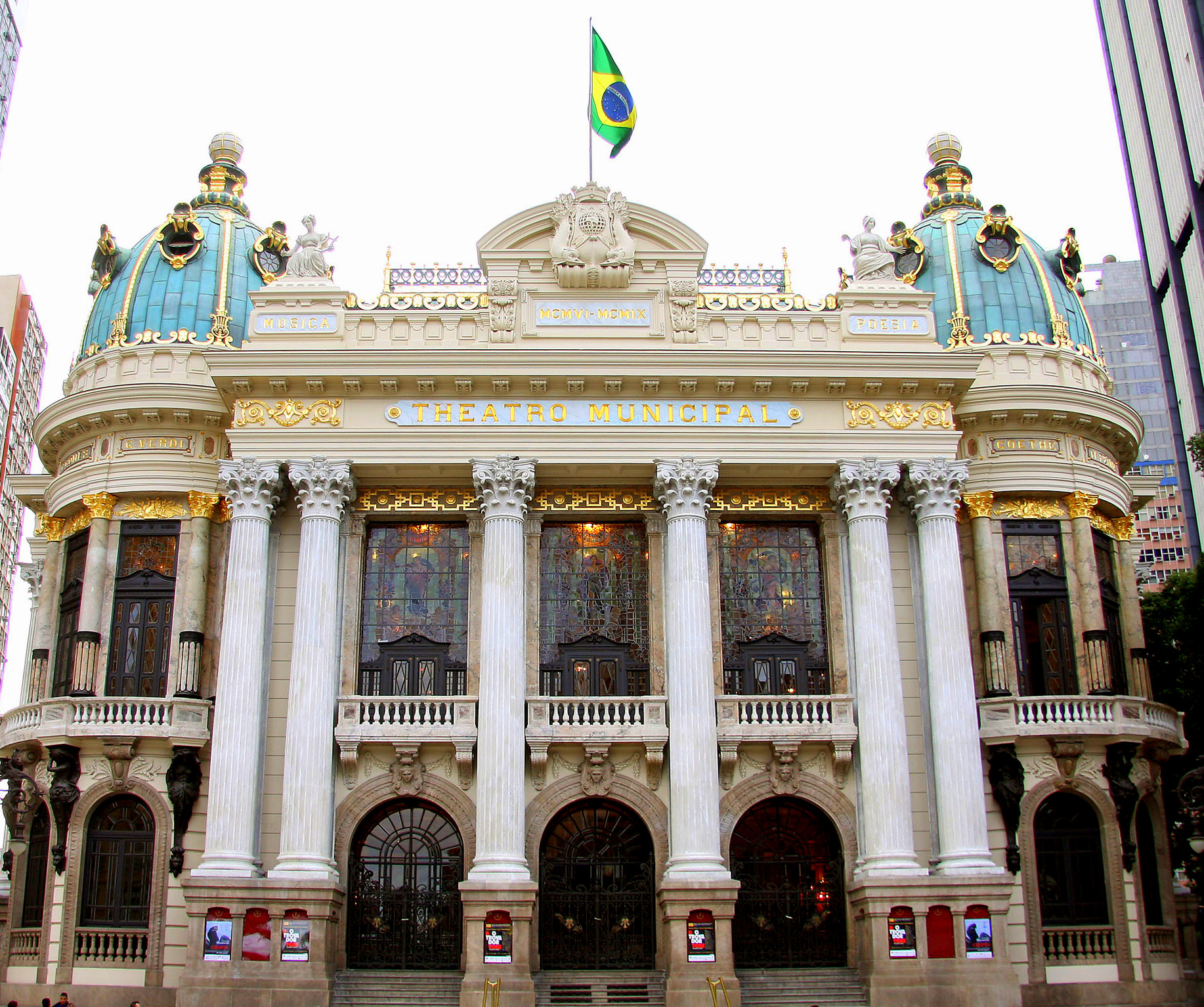
- The Theatro Municipal, Rio de Janeiro, where Chôros No. 6 was premiered
  George Enescu: Romanian Rhapsodies 1 and 2: Orchestre des Concerts Colonne, George Enescu, cond.; Heitor Villa-Lobos: Chôros No. 6. RIAS-Symphonie-Orchester, Berlin; Heitor Villa-Lobos, cond. Recorded in Berlin, January 1954. LP recording, 1 disc: analog, 33⅓ rpm, 12 in., monaural. Remington R-199-207. New York: Remington, 1956. Chôros No. 6 reissued on LP, together with a contemporaneous recording with the same orchestra of Bachianas Brasileiras No. 7, on Vox/Turnabout THS-65002, New York: Vox Records, 1974. This recording in turn reissued on CD, as Villa-Lobos Conducts Villa-Lobos. Varèse Sarabande VCD 47257. North Hollywood, Calif.: Varèse Sarabande, 1986. Again reissued on CD as Heitor Villa-Lobos: Bachianas Brasileiras 7; Chorus [sic] 6. CC030. [S.l.]: Three Mile Island, 2011.
- Villa-Lobos par Villa-Lobos: Concert du 04/04/1957. Jean Giraudeau, tenor; Camille Maurane, baritone; Jacques Chalude, bass; Chœur de la RTF; Orchestre Radio-Symphonique de Paris; Heitor Villa-Lobos, cond. Broadcast recording by the French Radio, made at the Salle Gaveau in Paris, on 4 April 1957. World premiere of the Symphony No. 10, preceded on an all-Villa-Lobos programme by performances of Erosão and Chôros No. 6. MP3 streaming audio. [Bry-sur-Marne]: Ina Musique(s), 2017.
- Heitor Villa-Lobos: Chôros No. 6 [With César Guerra-Peixe: Museu da Inconfidência; Marlos Nobre: Mosaico]. Orquestra Sinfônica Brasileira. Isaac Karabtchewsky, cond. Série super de luxo. LP recording, 1 disc: analog, 33⅓ rpm, 12 in., stereo. Philips 9500 120. Brazil: Philips, 1976.
- Music & Peace. Heitor Villa-Lobos: Chôros No. 6; Hector Berlioz: Le carnaval romain: ouverture; Igor Stravinsky: L'oiseau de feu (Suite)/ World Philharmonic Orchestra, Lorin Maazel cond.: Recorded live at the Theatro Municipal, Rio de Janeiro, 16 December 1986. CD recording, 1 disc: digital, 33⅓ rpm, 4¾ in., stereo. Auvidis AV 6113. [Also issued on LP, AV 4844, and cassette tape, AV 5844]. France: Auvidis, 1987.
- Ao vivo nos EUA. Villa-Lobos: Chôros No. 6, Embolada from Bachianas brasileiras no. 1, "O trenzinho do Caipira", from Bachianas brasileiras no. 2; Ernesto Nazareth: Batuque; Santos Coelho: Saudade eterna; Radamés Gnattali: Mulher rendeira, Schotisch, Choro (Tocata); Rubens Leal Brito: Modulando. Sexteto Brasileiro, Joel Nascimento, dir. CD recording, 1 disc: digital, 33⅓ rpm, 4¾ in., stereo. Kuarup KCD-093. Rio de Janeiro: Kuarup Discos, [1997?].
- Villa-Lobos: Chôros 1–7 (including the Introdução aos Chôros). Carlos Oramas, guitar; Johanne-Valérie Gélinas, flute; Radovan Cavallin, clarinet; Sergio Alonso, piano; Coro y Orquesta Filarmónica de Gran Canaria, Adrian Leaper, cond. CD recording, 1 disc: digital, 33⅓ rpm, 4¾ in., stereo. ASV CD DCA 1150. London: Sanctuary Records Group Limited, 2003.
- Villa-Lobos: Chôros, vol. 2 (Nos. 1, 4, 6, 8, and 9). Fabio Zanon, guitar; Linda Bustani and Ilan Rechtman, pianos; Sâo Paulo Symphony Orchestra, John Neschling, cond. CD recording, 1 disc: digital, 33⅓ rpm, 4¾ in., stereo. Bis BIS-CD 1450. Åkersberga: Grammofon, 2008.
- Villa-Lobos: Uirapuru; Bachianas Brasileiras No. 2; Chôros No. 6. Orquestra Sinfônica Municipal de São Paulo, Rodrigo de Carvalho, conductor. Recorded 30 November 2009 at the Teatro Municipal de São Paulo. CD recording, 1 disc: digital, 33⅓ rpm, 4¾ in., stereo. Lua Classical LUA 273. [Brazil]: Lua Classical, 2010.
- Villa-Lobos: The Guitar Manuscripts 2: Dime perché (arr. Bissoli); Valsa concerto No. 2 (completed Bissoli); Sexteto místico; Introdução aos Chôros; Chôros No. 1; Chôros No. 6; Canção do amor. Andrea Bissoli, guitar; Gabriella Pace, soprano; Ensemble Musagète; Minas Gerais Philharmonic Orchestra, Fabio Mechetti, cond. CD recording, 1 disc: digital, 33⅓ rpm, 4¾ in., stereo. Naxos 8.573116. [USA]: Naxos, 2014.
