= Gaveau =

French piano manufacturer

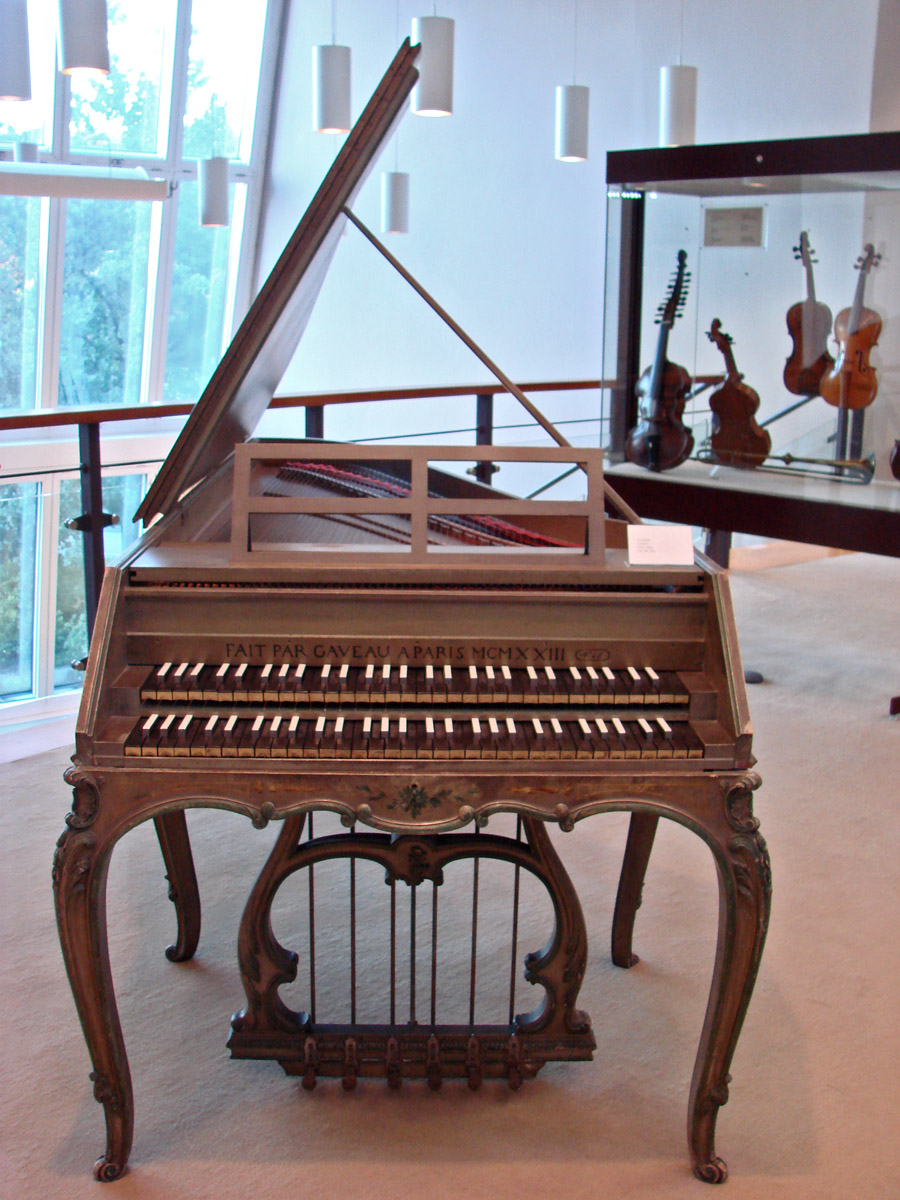
Harpsichord by Gaveau, 1923

Gaveau of Paris was a French piano manufacturer. The company was established by Joseph Gabriel Gaveau in 1847 in Paris and was one of the three largest piano makers in France (after Érard and Pleyel). Its factory was located at Fontenay-sous-Bois.

Some Gaveau pianos were constructed with art cabinets. Many pianos have been equipped with pneumatic systems (Odeola, Ampico and Welte).

In 1960, Gaveau merged with Érard. From 1971 to 1994 Gaveau pianos were made by pianoforte manufacturing company Wilhelm Schimmel. The brand is currently owned by Manufacture Française de Pianos, the same company that owns the Pleyel and Erard brands. Today, Manufacture Française de Pianos manufactures certain models under the Gaveau name.

== Family competition ==
Joseph Gabriel Gaveau had six children, and Étienne Gaveau received competition from his brothers.

Gabriel Gaveau was established in 1911. Gabriel Gaveau made some pianos with pedal or Duo-Art systems, and was located in 1919, 55-57 Av. Malakoff, 75016. (This part is now Av. Raymond Poincaré, near the Trocadéro.) This plant was requisitioned by the Germans in 1939.

Also in 1911, Augustin Gaveau created his own piano company with his own style of upright pianos.

In his autobiography My Young Years, Arthur Rubinstein recounts how he was contracted to play Gaveau pianos in concert. He writes of their "stiff unresponsive action" and "coldness of tone".

Artists such as Camille Saint-Saëns and Alfred Cortot enjoyed playing their Gaveau, interpreting composers including Chopin, Debussy and Satie.

== Salle Gaveau ==
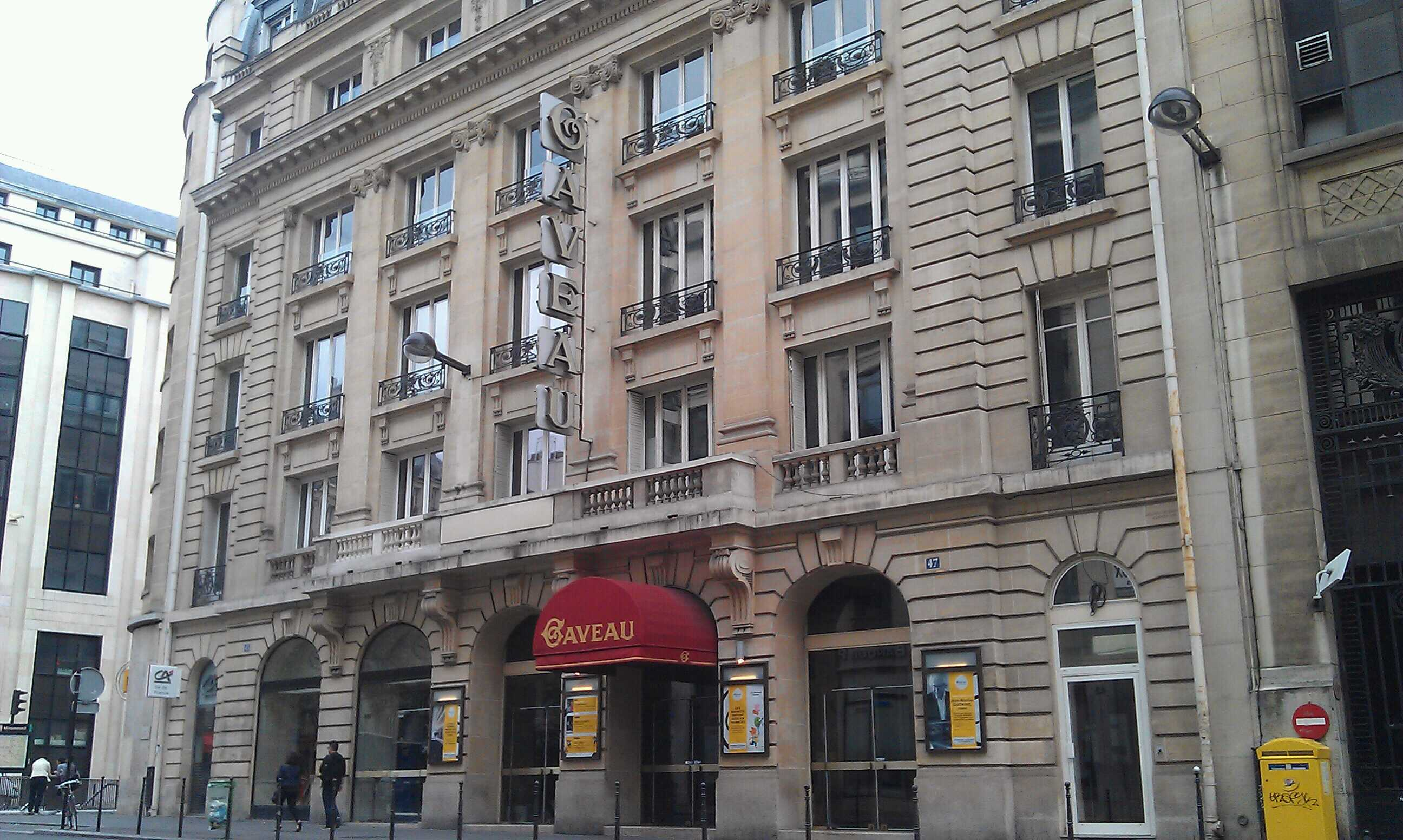
Salle Gaveau

A large building, including the manufacturer's headquarters and a 1,020-seat concert hall named Salle Gaveau, was built for Gaveau by the architect Jacques Hermant in 1906. The concert hall, located at 45, Rue la Boétie in the 8th arrondissement, is active with classical and jazz music. The Salle Rostropovitch is a smaller hall or reception room that can accommodate about 250 people seated or 800 standing.

== Recordings made with instruments by Gaveau ==
- François Dumont. Gabriel Fauré. Complete Nocturnes. Label: Piano Classics. Played on a Gaveau piano from 1922.
- Aline Piboule. Gabriel Fauré. Nocturnes & Barcarolles. Label: Harmonia Mundi. Played on a Gaveau piano from 1929.
