= List of compositions by Heitor Villa-Lobos =

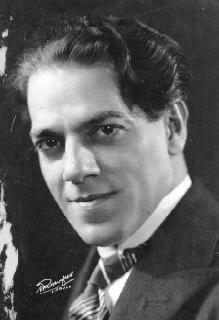
Heitor Villa-Lobos

This is a list of compositions by Heitor Villa-Lobos. It is still incomplete (he composed over 2000 works in his lifetime), and needs expansion. You can help. (More nearly complete lists of compositions may be found in the References or External Links listed below).

== Chôros ==
The Chôros are listed and described in Villa-Lobos, sua obra 1974, Appleby 1988, Peppercorn 1991a, Tarasti 1995, and Wright 1992.

- Introdução aos Chôros (Introduction to the Chôros), for guitar & orchestra (1929)
- Chôros No. 1 for guitar (1920)
- Chôros No. 2 for flute and clarinet (1924)
- Chôros No. 3 "Pica-páo" (Woodpecker) for clarinet, bassoon, saxophone, 3 horns, and trombone, or for male chorus, or for both together (1925)
- Chôros No. 4 for 3 horns and trombone (1926)
- Chôros No. 5 for piano (1925) "Alma brasileira" (Brazilian Soul)
- Chôros No. 6 for orchestra (1926)
- Chôros No. 7 "Settimino" (Septet) for flute, oboe, clarinet, saxophone, bassoon, violin, and cello, with tam-tam ad lib. (1924)
- Chôros No. 8 for orchestra with 2 pianos (1925)
- Chôros No. 9 for orchestra (1929)
- Chôros No. 10 for chorus and orchestra (1926) "Rasga o coração" (Tear Out the Heart)
- Chôros No. 11 for piano and orchestra (1928)
- Chôros No. 12 for orchestra (1929)
- Chôros No. 13 for 2 orchestras and band (1929) now lost
- Chôros No. 14 for orchestra, band and chorus (1928) now lost
- Chôros bis, for violin and cello (1928–29)
- Quinteto (em forma de chôros) for flute, oboe, cor anglais, clarinet and bassoon (1928); arr. flute, oboe, clarinet, horn, bassoon (1951)

== Bachianas Brasileiras ==
The Bachianas Brasileiras are listed and described in Villa-Lobos, sua obra 1974, Appleby 1988, Peppercorn 1991a, Tarasti 1995, and Wright 1992.

- No. 1 for at least 8 cellos (1930–38)
- No. 2 for orchestra (1930)
- No. 3 for piano and orchestra (1938)
- No. 4 for piano (1930–41); orchestrated in 1941
- No. 5 for voice and at least 8 cellos (1938–45)
- No. 6 for flute and bassoon (1938)
- No. 7 for orchestra (1942)
- No. 8 for orchestra (1944)
- No. 9 for chorus or string orchestra (1945)

== Concertos ==
The concertos are listed and described in Villa-Lobos, sua obra 1974, Appleby 1988, Peppercorn 1991a, Tarasti 1995, and Wright 1992.

- Suite for Piano and Orchestra (1913)
- Cello Concerto No. 1 (1915)
- Fantasia de movimentos mistos for violin & orchestra (1921)
- O Martírio dos Insetos for violin and orchestra (1925)
- Momoprecoce, fantasy for piano and orchestra (1929) or band (1931)
- Ciranda das sete notas for bassoon & string orchestra (1933)
- Piano Concerto No. 1 (1945)
- Piano Concerto No. 2 (1948)
- Fantasia for saxophone, three horns, and strings (1948)
- Guitar Concerto (1951) for Segovia
- Piano Concerto No. 3 (1952–57)
- Piano Concerto No. 4 (1952)
- Harp Concerto (1953) for Zabaleta
- Cello Concerto No. 2 (1953)
- Piano Concerto No. 5 (1954)
- Fantasia for Cello and Orchestra
- Harmonica Concerto (1955) for John Sebastian Snr.
- Concerto Grosso for wind quartet & wind ensemble (1959)
- Chôros No. 11 and Bachianas Brasileiras No. 3 are also concertante pieces for piano and orchestra

== Symphonies ==
The symphonies are listed and described in Villa-Lobos, sua obra 1974, Appleby 1988, Peppercorn 1991a, Tarasti 1995, and Wright 1992.

- No. 1 O Imprevisto (The Unforeseen) (1916)
- No. 2 Ascensão (Ascension) (1917)
- No. 3 A Guerra (The War) (1919)
- No. 4 A Vitória (The Victory) (1919)
- No. 5 A Paz (The Peace) (1920; lost)
- No. 6 Sobre a linha das montanhas do Brasil (On the Outline of the Mountains of Brasil) (1944)
- No. 7 Odisséia da paz (Odyssey of the Peace) (1945)
- No. 8 (1950)
- No. 9 (1952)
- No. 10 "Sume pater patrium" (Sinfonia ameríndia) (Sumé, Father of Fathers [Amer-Indian Symphony]) (1952)
- No. 11 (1955)
- No. 12 (1957)

== Other orchestral works (including ballet scores) ==
The other orchestral works are listed and described in Villa-Lobos, sua obra 1974, Appleby 1988, Peppercorn 1991a, Tarasti 1995, and Wright 1992.

- Tédio de Alvorada, symphonic poem (1916), reworked as Uirapuru
- Naufrágio de Kleônicos, symphonic poem (1916)
- Danças Africanas (1916)
- Sinfonietta No. 1 (1916)
- Iára (1917)
- Amazonas, ballet & symphonic poem (1917)
- Uirapuru, ballet and symphonic poem (1917–34)
- Dança Frenética (1918)
- Dança dos Mosquitos (1922)
- Francette et Piá (1928, orch. 1958)
- Rudepoêma (1926, orch. 1932)
- O Papagaio do moleque, the Kite of the Guttersnipe, a symphonic episode (1932)
- Caixinha de Boas Festas, symphonic poem & ballet (1932)
- Evolução dos Aeroplanos (1932)
- Dança da Terra, ballet (1939)
- Mandu-Çarará, secular cantata / children's ballet for mixed choir, children's choir & orchestra (1940)
- Suíte Saudade da Juventude No. 1 (1940)
- Madona, symphonic poem (1945)
- Sinfonietta No. 2 (1947)
- Erosão (Erosion), symphonic poem (1950)
- Rudá, symphonic poem & ballet (1951)
- Ouverture de L'Homme Tel (1952)
- Alvorada na Floresta Tropical, ouverture (1953)
- Odisseia de uma raça, symphonic poem (1953)
- Gênesis, symphonic poem & ballet (1954)
- Emperor Jones, a ballet (1956)
- Fantasia em Três Movimentos (in the form of a choros) for wind band (1958)
- Suite No. 1 for chamber orchestra (1959)
- Suite No. 2 for chamber orchestra (1959)

== Chamber music ==
The chamber music is listed and described in Villa-Lobos, sua obra 1974, Appleby 1988, Peppercorn 1991a, Tarasti 1995, and Wright 1992. (Information on the two Sextetos místicos in Peppercorn 1991b, 38–39)

- Sonate-fantaisie No. 1 for violin and piano, Desesperança (Despair) (1913)
- Sonate-fantaisie No. 2 for violin and piano (1914)
- Sonata for violin and piano No. 3 (1920)
- Sonata for violin and piano No. 4 (1923)
- Trio for piano and strings No. 1 (1911)
- Trio for piano and strings No. 2 (1915)
- Trio for piano and strings No. 3 (1918)
- Sexteto místico, for flute, oboe, saxophone, harp, celesta and guitar (1917, unfinished or lost)
- Sexteto místico, for flute, oboe, saxophone, harp, celesta and guitar (ca. 1955, replacement)
- Quarteto simbólico (Impressões da vida mundana), for flute, alto saxophone, harp, celesta and female voices (1921)
- Trio for oboe, clarinet & bassoon (1921)
- Nonetto, Impressão rápida de todo o Brasil (A Brief Impression of the Whole of Brazil) (1923)
- Quinteto em forma de choros for flute, oboe, clarinet, English horn or horn and bassoon (1928)
- Quatuor, for flute, oboe, clarinet and bassoon (1928)
- Distribuição de Flores for flute and guitar (1937)
- Trio for violin, viola and cello (1945)
- Divagacão for cello, piano and bass drum (adlib.) (1946)
- Duo for violin and viola (1946)
- Assobio a Jato ("The Jet Whistle") for flute and cello (1950)
- Fantaisie concertante for piano, clarinet and bassoon (1953)
- Duo for oboe and bassoon (1957)
- Quinteto Instrumental for flute, violin, viola, cello and harp (1957)
- Fantasia Concertante for 16 or 32 cellos (1958)
- Chôros Nos. 2,3,4,7 and Bachianas Brasileiras Nos. 1 and 6 are also chamber works

== String quartets ==
The string quartets are listed and described in Villa-Lobos, sua obra 1974, Appleby 1988, Peppercorn 1991a, Tarasti 1995, and Wright 1992. Information on the two versions of Quartet No. 1 is in Peppercorn 1991b, 32.

- Suíte graciosa (5 March 1915)
  - Andante
  - Allegretto
  - Grega Cançonette
- String Quartet No. 1, revised from the Suíte graciosa (1946)
  - Cantilena
  - Brincadeira
  - Canto lírico
  - Cançoneta
  - Melancolia
  - Saltando como um Saci
- String Quartet No. 2 (1915)
- String Quartet No. 3, Quarteto de pipocas (1917)
- String Quartet No. 4 (1917)
- String Quartet No. 5, Quarteto popular no. 1 (1931)
- String Quartet No. 6, Brazilian (1938)
- String Quartet No. 7 (1942)
- String Quartet No. 8 (1944)
- String Quartet No. 9 (1945)
- String Quartet No. 10 (1946)
- String Quartet No. 11 (1948)
- String Quartet No. 12 (1950)
- String Quartet No. 13 (1951)
- String Quartet No. 14 (1953)
- String Quartet No. 15 (1954)
- String Quartet No. 16 (1955)
- String Quartet No. 17 (1957)
- Villa Lobos left sketches for an 18th String Quartet.

== Sacred and other choral works ==
- Ave Maria, for four part choir (1918)
- Na Bahia Tem, for male choir (1926)
- Bazzum, for male choir (1936)
- Missa São Sebastião, for three voices (1936-37)
- Ave Maria
  - for five voices (1938)
  - for six voices (1948)
- Jose, for male choir a cappella (1944)
- As Costureiras, for female choir (1945)
- Pater Noster, for four voices (1950)
- Panis Angelicus, for four voices (1950)
- Sub Tuum Praesidium, for four voices (1952)
- Praesepe, for four voices (1952)
- Préces sem palavras, for male choir (1952)
- Duas Lendas Amerindias em Nheengatu, for choir a cappella (1952)
- Cor Dulce, Cor Amabile, for four voices (1952)
- Magnificat-Alleluia, for mezzo soprano, chorus and orchestra (1958)
- Bendita Sabedoria, for six voices (1958)

== Choral transcriptions ==
- J.S.Bach: The Well-Tempered Clavier, Book 1, Fugue No. 1, (1932)
- J.S.Bach: The Well-Tempered Clavier, Book 1, Fugue No. 21, (1932)
- J.S.Bach: The Well-Tempered Clavier, Book 1, Prelude No. 22, (1932)
- J.S.Bach: The Well-Tempered Clavier, Book 2, Fugue No. 5, (1932)
- Beethoven: Piano Sonata No. 8 'Pathétique' - II. Adagio cantabile, (1932)
- Chopin: Waltz No. 7, (1932)
- Massenet: Élégie, (1932)
- Mendelssohn: Lieder ohne Worte No. 9, (1932)
- Robert Schumann: Kinderszenen No. 7, Träumerei, (1933)
- Schubert: Schwanengesang No. 4, Ständchen, (1933)
- Rachmaninov: Morceau de fantaisie, Op. 3 - No. 2, (1934)
- J.S.Bach: The Well-Tempered Clavier, Book 2, Prelude No. 14, (1937)
- J.S.Bach: The Well-Tempered Clavier, Book 1, Prelude and Fugue No. 8, (1938)

== Songs (with piano) ==
- Miniaturas, six songs for voice and piano (1912–1917)
  - Chromo No.2
  - Viola
  - Chromo No.3
  - Sonho
  - Japonezas
  - Sino de Aldeia
- Ave Maria (1914)
- Padre Nosso (1914)
- Il Bove (1916)
- A Cascavel (1917)
- Amor y perfidia (1918)
- Sertão No Estio (1919)
- Tres Historietas (1920)
  - 1. Lune D'octobre
  - 2. O Novelozinho De Linha
  - 3. Solidão
- Epigramas irônicos e sentimentais, eight songs (1921-1923)
  - Eis a vida!
  - Inutil epigrama
  - Sonho de uma noite de verão
  - Epigrama
  - Perversidade
  - Pudor
  - Imagem
  - Verdade
- Serestas, fourteen songs (1925-26, "Vôo" and "Serenata" added 1943)
  - Pobre cega
  - Anjo da guarda
  - Canção da folha morta
  - Saudades da minha vida
  - Modinha
  - Na paz do outono
  - Cantiga do viúvo
  - Canção do carreiro ou Canção de um crepúsculo caricioso (sobre themas selvagens dos boiadeiros e carreiros, entre os índios e mamelucos do Brasil)
  - Abril
  - Desejo
  - Redondilha
  - Realejo
  - Vôo
  - Serenata
- Coleção Brasileira, two songs(?) (1925)
  - Tempos Atras
  - Tristeza
- Canções Indigenas, three songs (1926)
  - Canide Ioune Sabath (Ave amarela, canção elegíaca) (Melody collected in the 16th century by Jean de Léry)
  - Teiru (Canto fúnebre pela morte de um cacique)
  - A Iara
- Canções típicas brasileiras, thirteen songs (1929–1935)
  - Môkôcê cê-maká... (Dorme na rêde...). Canção para acalentar as criancinhas entre os Índios Paricis
  - Nozani-ná. Canto dos indios Paricis da Serra do Norte (Matto Grosso),
  - Papae Curumiassú
  - Xangô. Canto fetiche de Makumba
  - Estrella é lua nóva. Canto fetiche de Makumba
  - Vióla quebrada. Modinha de M. de A.
  - Adeus Êma, Desafio. Théma populaire du Nord de Minas Geraes
  - Pállida Madona. Modinha antiga
  - Tu passaste por este jardim... Modinha carioca, Thema de Alfredo Dutra
  - Cabocla de Caxangá
  - Pássaro fugitivo
  - Itabaiana
  - Onde o nosso amor nasceu
- As Filhas de Maria (1930)
- Modinhas e canções, song cycle(s) for voice and piano
  - Album 1, seven songs (1935–1943)
    - Canção do marinheiro (a maneira do genero ibérico de 1500, versos originaes da época) (1936)
    - Lundú da Marqueza de Santos (evocando a época - 1822) (1940)
    - Cantilena (Um canto que saiu das senzalas) (1936)
    - A gatinha parda (Sobre um tema infantil popular do século XIX) (1941)
    - Remeiro de São Francisco (Canto dos mestiços do Rio S. Francisco da Baia)
    - Nhapopê (modinha antiga, sobre um tema popular) (1935)
    - Evocação (1943)
  - Album 2, six songs (1943)
    - Pobre peregrino
    - Vida formosa
    - Nésta rua
    - Manda tiro, tiro lá
    - João Cambuête
    - Na corda da viola
- Duas Paisagens, two songs (1946)
  - Manhã Na Praia
  - Tarde Na Glória
- Bonsoir Paris! (1948)
- Canção do Poeta do Século XVIII (1948)
- Canção De Cristal (1950)
- Samba Clássico (1950)
- Jardim Fanado (1955)
- Sete Vezes (1959)

== Songs (with orchestra) ==
- Serestas (1925–26) (orchestral version of voice and piano original above)
- Modinhas e canções, song cycle(s) for voice and orchestra
  - Album 1, seven songs (1943) (orchestral version of voice and piano original above)
  - Album 2, six songs (1958-59) (orchestral version of voice and piano original above)
- Sete Vezes (1959) (orchestral version of voice and piano original above)

== Operas ==
The operas are listed and described in Villa-Lobos, sua obra 1974, Appleby 1988, Peppercorn 1991a, Tarasti 1995, and Wright 1992.

- Aglaia (1909), incorporated into Izaht
- Elisa (1910), incorporated into Izaht
- Comédia lírica em 3 atos (1911)
- Izaht (1914)
- Jesus (1918)
- Malazarte (1921)
- Magdalena, light opera (1947)
- Yerma (1955)
- A Menina das Nuvens (The Girl of the Clouds), light opera (1957–58)

== Ballets ==
- see: other orchestral works

== Music for films ==
The film music is listed and described in Villa-Lobos, sua obra 1974, Appleby 1988, Peppercorn 1991a, Tarasti 1995, and Wright 1992.

- Descobrimento do Brasil (Discovery of Brazil) (1938)
- Green Mansions (1959) (adapted as the concert work Floresta do Amazonas [Forest of the Amazon])

== Works for guitar solo ==
The guitar music is listed and described in Villa-Lobos, sua obra 1974, Appleby 1988, Peppercorn 1991a, Tarasti 1995, and Wright 1992. Information on the newly discovered 1928 Valsa-chôro from https://web.archive.org/web/20070218094019/http://durand-salabert-eschig.com/actualite.html, (accessed 4 December 2006).

- Panqueca (1900)
- Mazurka em ré maior (1901)
- Valsa brilhante (1904) originally titled Valsa concerto No. 2
- Fantasia (1909)
- Canção brasileira (1910)
- Quadrilha (1910)
- Tarantela (1910)
- Simples, Mazurka (1910)
- Dobrados (1909–1912)
- Chôro No. 1, "Chôro típico" (1920)
- Suíte popular brasileira (1928, rev. 1947–48)
1. Mazurka-Choro
2. Schottish-Choro
3. Valsa-Choro
4. Gavotta-Choro
5. Chorinho
- Valsa-chôro (ca. 1928) rejected original from the Suíte popular, replaced with a new "Valsa-chôro" in the revision of 1947–48
- Douze études (1929; rev. 1948/53)
1. Etude No. 1 in E minor: Allegro non troppo
2. Etude No. 2 in A major: Allegro
3. Etude No. 3 in D major: Allegro moderato
4. Etude No. 4 in G major: Un peu modéré—Grandioso
5. Etude No. 5 in C major: Andantino—Poco meno
6. Etude No. 6 in E minor: Poco Allegro
7. Etude No. 7 in E major: Tres animé—Moins
8. Etude No. 8 in C♯ minor: Modéré
9. Etude No. 9 in F♯ minor: Tres peu animé
10. Etude No. 10 in B minor: Tres animé—Un peu animé—Vif
11. Etude No. 11 in E minor: Lent—Poco meno—Animé
12. Etude No. 12 in A minor: Animé—Più mosso—a tempo primo—Un peu plus animé
- Valsa sentimental (1936)
- Five Preludes (1940)
1. Prelude No. 1 in E minor ("Melodia lírica"): Andantino espressivo Più mosso
2. Prelude No. 2 in E major ("Melodia capadócia"): Andantino—Più mosso
3. Prelude No. 3 in A minor ("Homenagem a Bach"): Andante—Molto adagio e dolorido
4. Prelude No. 4 in E minor ("Homenagem ao índio brasileiro"): Lento—Animato—Moderato
5. Prelude No. 5 in D major ("Homenagem à Vida Social"): Poco animato—Meno—Più mosso
6. Prelude No. 6 (Lost)

== Music for piano solo ==
The piano music is listed and described in Villa-Lobos, sua obra 1974, Appleby 1988, Peppercorn 1991a, Tarasti 1995, and Wright 1992.

- Celestial, waltz (1904)
- Tristorosa, waltz (1910)
- Ibericarabe (1914)
- Ondulando (1914)
- Danças Características Africanas (1915)
- Suíte Floral (1918)
- Histórias da Carochinha (1919)
- A Lenda do Caboclo (1920)
- Carnaval das crianças (1920)
- A Prole do Bebê, first series (1920)
  - Branquinha (A Boneca de Louça) – Little White Doll (The Porcelain Doll)
  - Moreninha (A Boneca de Massa) – Little Brunette Doll (The Paste Doll)
  - Caboclinha (A Boneca de Barro) – Little Mestiza Doll (The Clay Doll)
  - Mulatinha (A Boneca de Borracha) – Little Mulatta Doll (The Rubber Doll)
  - Negrinha (A Boneca de Pau) – Little Black Doll (The Wooden Doll)
  - A Pobrezinha (A Boneca de Trapo) – The Poor Little Doll (The Rag Doll)
  - O Polichinelo – The Punch
  - A Bruxa (A Boneca de Pano) – The Witch (The Cloth Doll)
- A Prole do Bebê, second series (1921)
  - A Baratinha de Papel (The Paper Little Cockroach)
  - O Gatinho de Papelão (The Box-Paper Kitten)
  - O Camundongo de Massa (The Paste Mouse)
  - O Cachorrinho de Borracha (The Rubber Puppy)
  - O Cavalinho de Pau (The Wooden Little Horse)
  - O Boizinho de Chumbo (The Lead Little Bull)
  - O Passarinho de Pano (The Cloth Little Bird)
  - O Ursinho de Algodão (The Cotton Little Bear)
  - O Lobinho de Vidro (The Glass Little Wolf)
- A Prole do Bebê, third series (1926) now lost
- A Fiandeira (1921)
- Rudepoêma (1921–26)
- Simples coletânea, W134 (1922)
- Sul America (1925)
- Cirandinhas (1925)
  - Zangou-se o Cravo com a Rosa
  - Adeus, Bela Morena
  - Vamos, Maninha
  - Olha Aquela Menina
  - Senhora Pastora
  - Cai, Cai, Balão
  - Todo Mundo Passa
  - Vamos Ver a Mulatinha
  - Carneirinho, Carneirão
  - A Canoa Virou
  - Nesta Rua tem um Bosque
  - Lindos Olhos Que Ela Tem
- Cirandas (1926)
  - Terezinha de Jesus
  - A Condessa – (The Countess)
  - Senhora Dona Sancha
  - O Cravo Brigou com a Rosa – (The Carnation Fought The Rose)
  - Pobre Cega – (Poor Blind Woman)
  - Passa, Passa Gavião – (Go Away, Go Away, Hawk)
  - Xô, Xô, Passarinho – (Shoo, Shoo, Little Bird)
  - Vamos Atrás de Serra, Calunga – Let's Go to the Mountain, Calunga
  - Fui no Tororó – I went to Tororó
  - O Pintor de Cannahy – The Painter of Canai
  - Nesta Rua, Nesta Rua – In This Street
  - Olha o Passarinho, Dominé – Look at the Little Bird, Dominé
  - À Procura de uma Agulha – Looking for a Needle
  - A Canoa Virou – The Canoe Capsized
  - Que Lindos Olhos! – What Beautiful Eyes!
  - Có, Có, Có – Cheep, Cheep, Cheep
- Saudades das selvas brasileiras (1927)
- Bachianas brasileiras No. 4 (1930–41)
  - Preludio – (Introdução) – Prelude – (Introduction) (1941)
  - Coral – (Canto do Sertão) – Chorale – (Song of the Country) (1941)
  - Aria – (Cantiga) – Aria – (Song) (1935)
  - Dansa – (Miudinho) – Dance – (Miudinho) (1930)
- Caixinha de Música Quebrada (1931) – Little Broken Music Box
- Francette et Pià (1932)
- Valsa da dor (1932)
- Guia Prático (1932–49)
- Ciclo brasileiro (1936–37)
  - Plantio do Caboclo – Native Planting Song
  - Impressões Seresteiras – Minstrel Impressions
  - Festa no Sertão – Jungle Festival
  - Dança do Índio Branco – Dance of the White Indian
- As Três Marias (1939)
- New York Sky-Line Melody (1939)
- Poema Singelo (1942)
- Homenagem a Chopin (1949)
  - Nocturne
  - Ballade
