= Étude No. 9 (Villa-Lobos) =

Heitor Villa-Lobos's Étude No. 9, part of his Twelve Études for Guitar, was first published by Max Eschig, Paris, in 1953.

== Structure ==
The piece is in F-sharp minor and is marked Très peu animé, and evokes the nostalgic countryside atmosphere associated with the cavaquinho.

== Analysis ==
Étude No. 9 is a study in arpeggios and slurred notes, developing musical ideas by Carcassi and Carulli. There is an emphasis on thirds, as in the Fifth Étude.
