= String Quartet No. 9 =

String Quartet No. 9 may refer to:

- String Quartet No. 9 (Beethoven) by Ludwig van Beethoven
- String Quartet No. 9 (Diamond) by David Diamond
- String Quartet No. 9 (Dvořák) by Antonín Dvořák
- String Quartet No. 9 (Hill) by Alfred Hill
- String Quartet No. 9 (Maconchy) by Elizabeth Maconchy
- String Quartet No. 9 (Milhaud), Op. 140, by Darius Milhaud
- String Quartet No. 9 (Mozart) by Wolfgang Amadeus Mozart
- String Quartet No. 9 (Porter) by Quincy Porter
- String Quartet No. 9 (Rihm) by Wolfgang Rihm
- String Quartet No. 9 (Schubert) by Franz Schubert
- String Quartet No. 9 (Shostakovich) by Dmitri Shostakovich
- String Quartet No. 9 (Simpson) by Robert Simpson
- String Quartet No. 9 (Spohr) by Louis Spohr
- String Quartet No. 9 (Villa-Lobos) by Heitor Villa-Lobos
