= Modinhas e canções =

- by Heitor Villa-Lobos
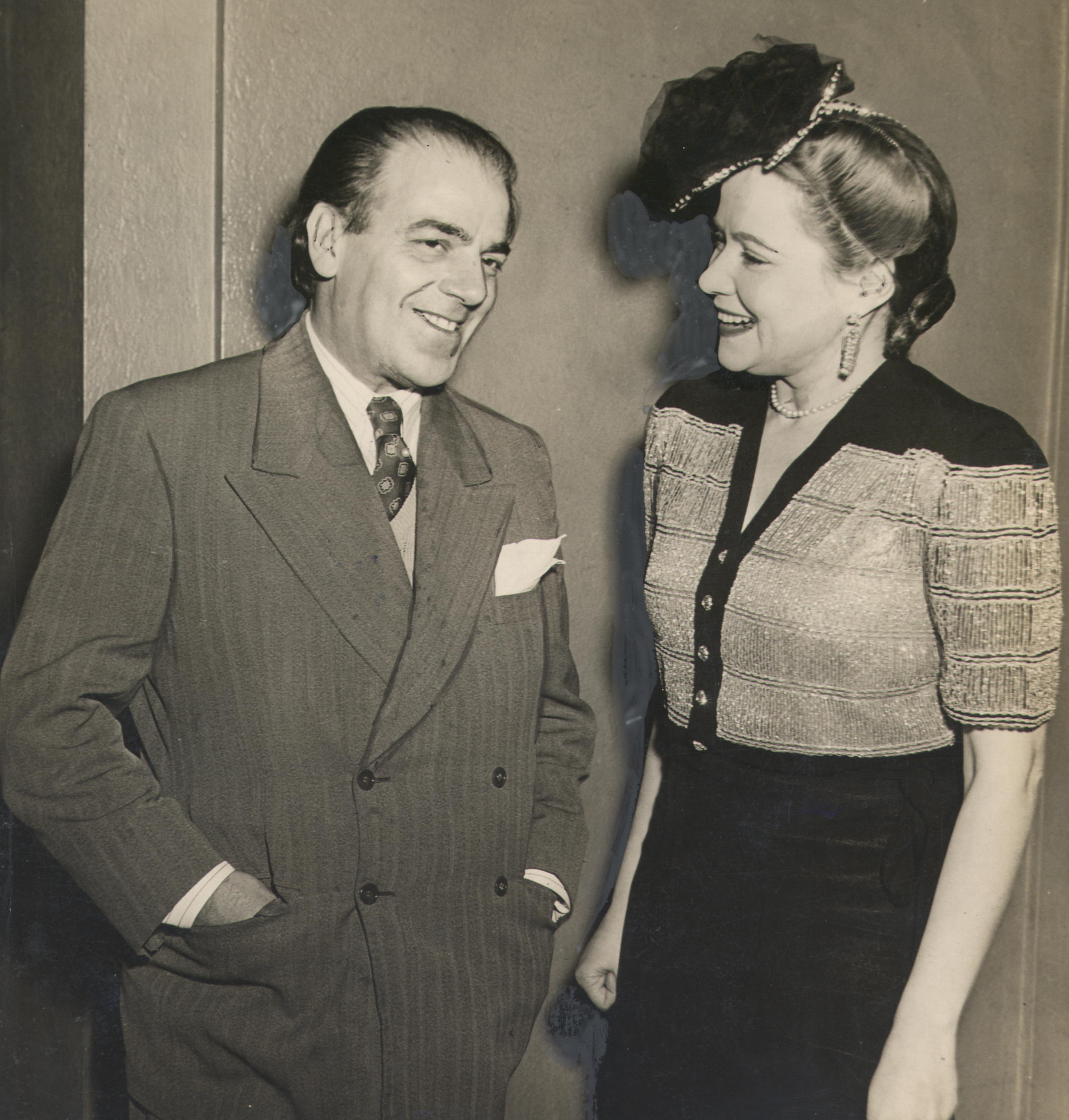
- Heitor Villa Lobos and Bidu Sayão in 1945
- Catalogue: Album No. 1 W365 (original); W406 (arrangement); Album No. 2 W441 (original); W563 (arrangement)
- Year: 1933–43
- Language: Portuguese
- Duration: 18 minutes (Album No. 1); 11 minutes (Album No. 2)
- Movements: 7 (Album No. 1); 6 (Album No. 2)
- Scoring: Voice and piano

Modinhas e canções, W365 & W441 (from Brazilian Portuguese: Modinhas and songs) is the name of two compositions by Brazilian composer Heitor Villa-Lobos. The two albums were composed in a period of time between 1933 and 1943.

== Background ==
=== Album No. 1 (1935-43) ===
The first set of Modinhas e canções was composed of songs written in different years, although all the pieces were composed in Rio de Janeiro. Evocação, the last piece in the set, was the first to be written, in 1933. The piece, to a text by Sylvio Salema, was described by Villa-Lobos as a "study for a popular song". The next-to-last piece, Nhapôpé, was originally written next, in 1935. It is an "old modinha on a popular theme", to a text by Alberto Deodato. Then, it was the first piece in the set, Canção do Marinheiro, which was written after verses by Gil Vicente. It is described in the score as a piece written "in the melodic style of the Iberian genre of 1500, using original verses from the period."

A Gatinha Parda, the fourth piece from the set, was written in 1937. It was written "after a popular nursery theme of the 19th century", although Villa-Lobos never mentioned the librettist to this piece. Cantinela, the third piece, was composed later, in 1938. It employs aspects from Afro-Brazilian music. The composer mentions the "Recôncavo Baiano" as the place of origin to the materials, which were collected by Sodré Vianna. Then, Lundu da Marquesa de Santos was composed in 1940, to a text by Viriato Correia. This piece was originally written for voice and orchestra, and was destined to be performed as a larger theatrical act entitled Marquesa de Santos. It was described as a piece that "evokes the year 1822". Finally, the fifth piece, Remeiro de São Francisco, was the last to be composed, in 1941. It draws on musical material collected by Sodré Vianna among the mixed-race communities of the São Francisco River region.

The whole set of seven songs was published by Arthur Napoleão, by Irmãos Vitale in 1950, and, later, by Max Eschig in 1957. Because it was not initially conceived as a set, the pieces some pieces were first performed individually. The Cantinela was first performed at the Sala del Teatro Cervantes, in Buenos Aires, on May 28, 1935, years before it was considered a completed piece. Singer Stefana de Macedo and Villa-Lobos at the piano premiered the piece. Cancão do Marinheiro, Lundu da Marquesa de Santos and Remeiro de São Francisco were all premiered at the Salão Leopoldo Miguez of the Escola Nacional de Música, in Rio de Janeiro, in a performance by Maria Figueiró Bezerra, with Geraldo Rocha Bezerra at the piano, on July 25, 1942. The first complete performance on record was given at the Espaço BNDES, in Rio de Janeiro, on November 10, 2016, on the occasion of the 54th Festival Villa-Lobos, with Carol McDavit and Flávio Augusto at the piano.

==== Arrangement for voice and orchestra ====
The piece was also arranged for voice and orchestra between 1936 and 1939 in Rio de Janeiro. This arrangement received catalogue number W406. Out of the whole set, the only piece that was originally written for voice and orchestra is Lundu da Marquesa de Santos, which premiered at the Teatro Rival in Rio with the Companhia Dulcina de Moraes, on March 30, 1938, as it was meant to be a part of Viriato Correia's Marquesa de Santos. According to Angela Maria de Castro Gomes, in her article published in the journal Varia Historia, “On the title page one learns that it was a comedy in three acts and seven scenes, containing three musical numbers composed by Maestro Villa-Lobos. The mention of Villa-Lobos (below the title) already shows the prestige of the production." The play was suggested and requested by one of the greatest Brazilian stage actresses of that time: Dulcina de Moraes, who played the Marquesa from the conception of the show.

The first performance on American soil took place a few years before Villa-Lobos's death, on July 8, 1957, at the Lewisohn Stadium, in New York. The Stadium Symphony Orchestra with Villa-Lobos as the conductor and Bidu Sayão as the soloist premiered Nhapôpé and also performed Lundu da Marquesa de Santos for American audiences. This arrangement was never published, but most of the autographs are preserved, either as original autographs or as heliographic copies, at the Museu Villa-Lobos.

=== Album No. 2 (1943) ===
Villa-Lobos specified that each one of the pieces in the second album consist of "popular melody and lyrics collected by E. Villalba-Filho" (Villa-Lobos's pseudonym). All of them were written in 1943, in Rio de Janeiro. Additionally, the fifth piece, entitled João Cambuête was alternatively entitled "canção das negras". The premiere of the whole set was also given at the Espaço BNDES, in Rio, during the 54 Festival Villa-Lobos. It took place on November 7, 2016, with singer Rosana Lamosa and pianist Nahim Marun. This piece was published posthumously by Max Eschig, in 1964.

==== Arrangement for voice and orchestra ====
The second album was also arranged for voice and orchestra, even though it was never published and had no known premieres. The arrangement received catalogue number W563. It was written between 1958 and 1959, a few months before the composer's death, in New York City. The only completed versions at the time of Villa-Lobos's death were the first song, the third and the fourth. A heliographic copy of the autograph materials from all three extant pieces are nowadays preserved at the Museu Villa-Lobos.

== Structure ==
The two original albums for voice and piano contain a total of thirteen songs. They have an approximate duration of 18 minutes (Album No. 1) and 11 minutes (Album No. 2). The movement list is as follows:

Modinhas e canções, Album No. 1
1. Canção do Marinheiro
2. Lundu da Marquesa de Santos
3. Cantilena (Um canto que saiu das Senzalas)
4. A gatinha parda
5. Remeiro de São Francisco
6. Nhapôpé
7. Evocação
Modinhas e canções, Album No. 2
1. Pobre peregrino
2. Vida formosa
3. Nesta rua
4. Manda tiro, tiro, lá
5. João Cambuête
6. Na corda da viola

=== Arrangements ===
Each voice and orchestra arrangements in these two albums vary in scoring. The following is a full scoring list of each piece according to best evidence:

Album No. 1

1. Canção do marinheiro — flute, oboe, English horn, B-flat clarinet, alto saxophone, bassoon, three French horns, trumpet, trombone, tuba, harp, and strings.
2. Lundu da marquesa de Santos — flute, oboe, two A clarinets, two bassoons, two French horns, timpani, harp, and strings.
3. Cantilena (Um Canto que Saiu das Senzalas) — flute, oboe, B-flat clarinet, bassoon, French horn, trombone, harp, and strings.
4. A gatinha parda — flute, oboe, B-flat clarinet, bassoon, French horn, trombone, harp, and strings.
5. Remeiro de São Francisco — two flutes, two oboes, English horn, two B-flat clarinets, two bassoons, four French horns, two trombones, tuba, timpani, harp, and strings.
6. Nhapôpé — flute, oboe, B-flat clarinet, bassoon, French horn, trombone, harp, and strings.
7. Evocação — piccolo, two flutes, two oboes, English horn, B-flat clarinet, two bassoons, contrabassoon, four French horns, trumpet, two trombones, tuba, timpani, harp, celesta, and strings.

Album No. 2

1. Pobre peregrino — piccolo, two flutes, two oboes, English horn, two B-flat clarinets, bass clarinet, two bassoons, contrabassoon, two French horns, two trumpets, trombone, tuba, timpani, cymbals, triangle, harp, and strings.
3. Nesta rua — flute, oboe, two B-flat clarinets, two bassoons, two French horns, timpani, harp, and strings.
4. Manda tiro, tiro, lá — two flutes, two oboes, two B-flat clarinets, two bassoons, two French horns, timpani, harp, and strings.

== Recordings ==
After Heitor Villa-Lobos was able to leave Brazil again following the dictator Getúlio Vargas's ousting in 1945, he started touring Europe once again. This led him to record A viola on February 12, 1948, at the Abbey Road Studio No. 3, in London. This performance was given by baritone Frederick Fuller with Villa-Lobos at the piano. Because this cycle was not widely circulated, it has only been recorded a few times and remains difficult to find in recordings. The following is a list of complete recordings of the piece:

- Tenor Mark Heller and pianist Alfred Heller (Album No. 1) and soprano Carolyn Scimone with the same pianist (Album No. 2) recorded the whole set in March 1992, at the LRP Studios, New York City, New York, USA. The recording was released by Etcetera in 1992.
