= Étude No. 1 =

Étude No. 1 may refer to:

- Étude No. 1 (Villa-Lobos)
- Étude No. 1 (Chopin)
- Étude No. 1 (Liszt)
- Étude No. 1 (Scriabin)
- Étude No. 1 (Alkan)
