= Felicja Blumental =

Polish pianist and composer

Felicja Blumental (28 December 1908 – 31 December 1991) was a Polish pianist and composer. "She was one of the relatively few women born in the first quarter of the twentieth century to have achieved an important career as a concert pianist."

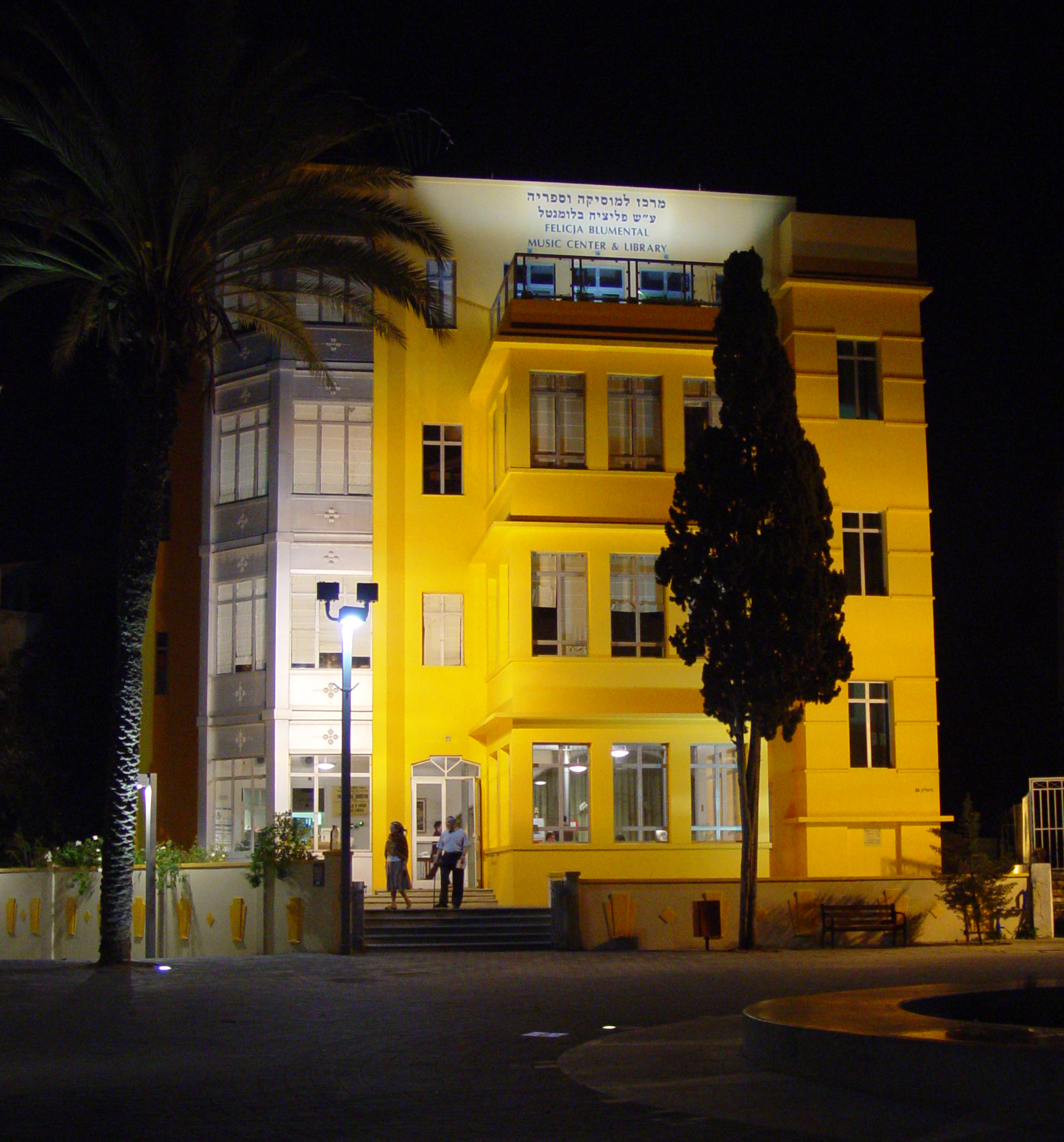
The Felicja Blumental Music Center and Library building in Tel Aviv

== Early life ==
Felicja Blumental was born in Warsaw, Poland, into a Jewish musical family, daughter of a violinist. She began piano lessons at the age of five, and made her debut at the age of ten. She studied at the National Conservatory in Warsaw, taking piano lessons from Zbigniew Drzewiecki (who founded the International Frederick Chopin Piano Competition) and composition lessons from the composer Karol Szymanowski. She later studied privately in Switzerland with Józef Turczyński, a noted Chopin interpreter and scholar.

== Personal life ==
In 1938, she and her husband Markus Mizne moved first to Nice, then to Brazil to escape the growing antisemitism in Europe. She became a Brazilian citizen, and for the rest of her life championed the music and composers of her adopted country. Her subsequent career saw her settling in Milan in 1962, then in 1973 in London.

== Musical career ==
Blumental's repertoire was wide and adventurous, ranging from the Portuguese baroque to South American contemporary works. Her numerous recordings also included many forgotten concertos by composers such as Carl Czerny (Piano Concerto in A minor, Op. 214), Ferdinand Ries (Piano Concerto in C-sharp minor, Op. 55) and John Field. Heitor Villa-Lobos wrote his Piano Concerto No. 5 for her; she was soloist at the world premiere on 8 May 1955, at the Royal Festival Hall, London, with the London Philharmonic Orchestra under Jean Martinon, and she also recorded the concerto in Paris, under the baton of the composer. Krzysztof Penderecki dedicated his Partita for harpsichord and orchestra to her. Her recording of this work won a Grand Prix du Disque of the Charles Cros Academy of France in 1975.

Among her recordings was a boxed set of Beethoven's complete works for solo piano and orchestra, including two early works without opus number, as well as Beethoven's own arrangement for piano of his violin concerto. It is, however, her Chopin playing for which she will be most remembered. A pianist of considerable power, despite her diminutive size, her recordings of the Chopin mazurkas, in particular, are considered landmark interpretations.

She died in 1991 in Israel, on one of her many concert tours of the country. She is buried in Tel Aviv's Kiryat Shaul Cemetery. Her daughter, the singer Annette Céline, was one of the organizers of the annual Felicja Blumental International Music festival until her death on 3 June 2017.

Many of Blumental's recordings have been restored on Brana Records, and all CD covers feature the art prints of her husband Markus Mizne.
