= Étude No. 3 (Villa-Lobos) =

Heitor Villa-Lobos's Étude No. 3, part of his Twelve Études for Guitar, was first published by Max Eschig, Paris, in 1953.

== Structure ==
The piece, strongly influenced by the didactic works of earlier composers for the guitar, is in D major and is marked Allegro moderato.

== Analysis ==
Étude No. 3 is an arpeggio study, like the two preceding études, but incorporating slurred notes (as in Étude No. 2) and barre chords.
