= Étude No. 7 (Villa-Lobos) =

- Étude by Heitor Villa-Lobos
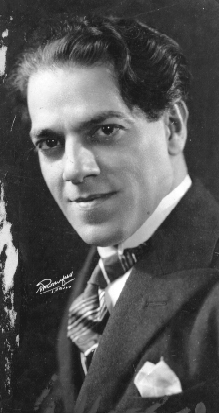
- Heitor Villa-Lobos
- Key: E major
- Catalogue: W235
- Composed: 1928: Paris
- Dedication: Andrés Segovia
- Published: 1953: Paris
- Publisher: Max Eschig
- Recorded: 27 June 1952 Andrés Segovia (issued on An Andrés Segovia Concert, 1 disc, 33⅓ rpm, 12 inch, monaural. Brunswick AXTL 1010. England: Brunswick Records; Decca (Gold Label Series) DL 9638, New York: Decca Records.
- Duration: 2–4 mins.
- Movements: 1
- Scoring: guitar

Premiere
- Date: 5 March 1947:
- Location: Wellesley College, Wellesley, Massachusetts
- Performers: Andrés Segovia, guitar

Heitor Villa-Lobos's Étude No. 7, one of his Twelve Études for Guitar, was first published by Max Eschig, Paris, in 1953.

== History ==
The first public performance of this étude (together with those of Études 1 and 8) was given by Andrés Segovia on 5 March 1947 at Wellesley College in Wellesley, Massachusetts..

== Structure ==
The piece is in E major and is marked Très animé.

== Analysis ==
Étude No. 7 is a study, first in rapid scales, then a section of arpeggios supporting a lyrical melody played entirely on the first string, and a return to the scales, creating a ternary (ABA) form.
