= Étude No. 6 (Villa-Lobos) =

- Étude by Heitor Villa-Lobos
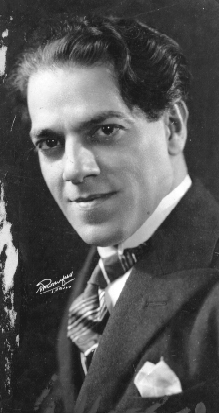
- Heitor Villa-Lobos
- Key: E minor
- Catalogue: W235
- Composed: 1928: Paris
- Dedication: Andrés Segovia
- Published: 1953: Paris
- Publisher: Max Eschig
- Duration: 2–4 mins.
- Scoring: guitar

Premiere
- Date: 5 March 1947:
- Location: Wellesley College, Wellesley, Massachusetts
- Performers: Andrés Segovia, guitar

Heitor Villa-Lobos's Étude No. 6, one of his Twelve Études for Guitar, was first published by Max Eschig, Paris, in 1953.

== Structure ==
The piece is in E minor and is marked Poco allegro

== Analysis ==
Étude No. 6 is a chord study opening with heavily accented chords in a pattern suggesting the Argentine tango (Santos 1985, 24).
