= Partita (Penderecki) =

Composition by Krzysztof Penderecki

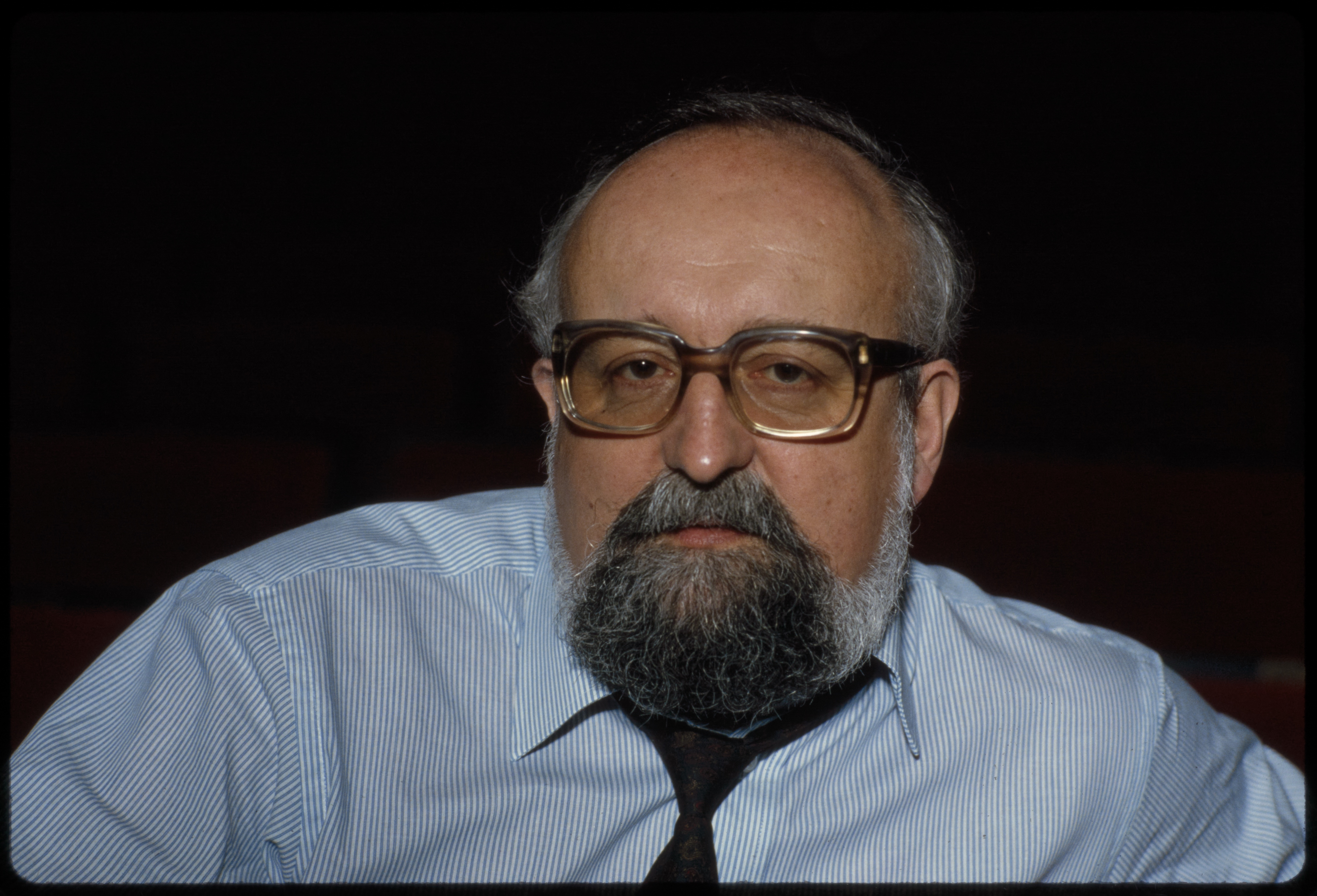
Krzysztof Penderecki in the 1980s

The Partita for Harpsichord and Orchestra (sometimes also referred to as the Partita for Harpsichord, Electric Guitar, Bass Guitar, Harp, Double Bass, and Chamber Orchestra or the Harpsichord Concerto), is a composition by Polish composer Krzysztof Penderecki. It was finished in 1971 and is Penderecki's only major composition for a harpsichord soloist.

== Composition ==
Penderecki's Partita was commissioned by the Eastman School of Music in Rochester, New York to commemorate the institution's 50th anniversary. The work was finished in 1971 and had its first hearing in Rochester on February 7, 1972, with Felicja Blumenthal playing the harpsichord and Walter Hendl conducting the Eastman School of Music Philharmonia. It was initially conceived as a Partita for Harpsichord; however, the electric guitar, the bass guitar, the harp and a double bass had a quite significant role in the work. Accordingly, when Penderecki revised the composition in 1991 and premiered the revised version on January 5, 1992, these instruments had credit as well. The second premiere took place in Munich, with Elisabeth Chojnacka at the harpsichord, Michael Goltz at the electric guitar, Hans Lengefeld at the bass guitar, Han-An Liu at the harp, Matthias Weber at the double bass, and Penderecki himself conducting the Munich Philharmonic.

== Structure ==
The work is in only one movement. However, some sources suggest that the work can be divided into two sections, marked Allegro ma non troppo and Allegro molto in the score. No recording has divided the work into such sections. Even though the title of the composition may misleadingly suggest a standard suite of dances or dance-related movements, it is generally conceived as a concerto grosso and variation form.

The compositions starts with the strings, which play long, asynchronical notes, some of them a semi-tone away. After that, a whole set of trills, fast arpeggios and uneven rhythms is displayed. It is worth mentioning the implementation of three cadenzas for harpsichord, which were added by the composer for the second premiere of the work.

== Notable recordings ==
Here is a list of some of the most well-known recordings of this piece:

Orchestra	Conductor	Harpsichordist	Record Company	Year of Recording	Format
Polish Radio National Symphony Orchestra	Krzysztof Penderecki	Felicja Blumental	EMI	1972	CD
Southwest German Radio Symphony Orchestra	Krzysztof Penderecki	Elżbieta Stefańska-Łukowicz	Erato	1979	CD
Warsaw Philharmonic Orchestra	Antoni Wit	Elzbieta Stefanska-Lukowicz	Naxos	2009	CD
