= Étude No. 8 (Villa-Lobos) =

- by Heitor Villa-Lobos
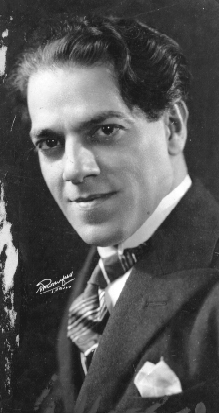
- Heitor Villa-Lobos
- Key: C-sharp minor
- Catalogue: W235
- Composed: 1928: Paris
- Dedication: Andrés Segovia
- Published: 1953: Paris
- Publisher: Max Eschig
- Recorded: 27 June 1949 Andrés Segovia (issued on Villa-Lobos: Two Studies [Nos. 1 and 8]. 1 disc, 78rpm, 12 inch, monaural. Columbia L.X. 1229 (matrix nos. CAX 10567; CAX 10570). England: Columbia Records.
- Duration: 3 mins.
- Scoring: guitar

Premiere
- Date: 5 March 1947:
- Location: Wellesley College, Wellesley, Massachusetts
- Performers: Andrés Segovia, guitar

Heitor Villa-Lobos's Étude No. 8, one of his Twelve Études for Guitar, was first published by Max Eschig, Paris, in 1953.

== History ==
The first public performance of this étude (together with those of Études 1 and 7) was given by Andrés Segovia on 5 March 1947 at Wellesley College in Wellesley, Massachusetts.

== Structure ==
The piece is in C-sharp minor and is marked Modéré.

== Analysis ==
Étude No. 8 is a study in arpeggios and slurs. The main melody is introduced first in the bass, under the arpeggios, then is passed to the higher strings, and back and forth.
