= Momoprecoce =

Composition by Heitor Villa-Lobos

- by Heitor Villa-Lobos
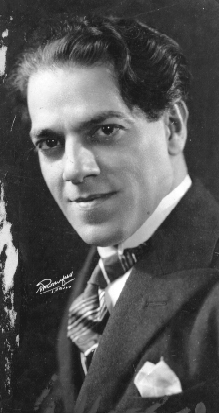
- Heitor Villa-Lobos, c. 1922
- Catalogue: W240
- Year: 1929
- Related: Carnaval das crianças
- Dedication: Magda Tagliaferro
- Duration: 22 minutes approx.
- Movements: 1
- Scoring: Piano and orchestra

Momoprecoce, W240 (originally and alternatively spelled Mômo precoce), is a fantasy for piano and orchestra by Brazilian composer Heitor Villa-Lobos. An arrangement into one movement of the Carnaval das crianças, it was originally written in 1929.

It has an approximate duration of 22 minutes.

== Background ==
The origins of Momoprecoce can be traced back to the Carnaval das crianças, a children's suite scored for piano written in 1920. Momoprecoce is an elaborate concertante arrangement finished in 1929 in Rio de Janeiro. Although the original suite consisted of eight pieces, Momoprecoce was condensed into one continuous movement with no separation. The piece is claimed to have been premiered in 1929, in the Concergebouw, Amsterdam, by dedicatee Magda Tagliaferro and conductor Pierre Monteux. However, even though Tagliaferro was in fact in Amsterdam at the time, later research by Frank de Munnik of Dutch State Radio found no evidence supporting this claim and stated that, even though Tagliaferro did give a concert, it was a solo recital, not in the Concertgebouw, and with no mention of Villa-Lobos in the program.

The first performance in public of Momoprecoce on record is the one Tagliaferro gave in Paris, on February 23, 1930, with conductor Enrique Fernández Arbós. Villa-Lobos himself conducted it with Tagliaferro at Paris's Salle Gaveau two months later, on April 4. The composer conducted the work many times with different orchestras and performers in many cities around America and Europe, including Rio de Janeiro, Barcelona, Los Angeles, and Miami. It was published in Paris in 1934 by Max Eschig, and, later, by the Academia Brasileira de Música.

Villa-Lobos also wrote an additional arrangement of Momoprecoce for piano and band, with catalogue number W259, The first performance took place on 21 October 1931 at the Theatro Municipal in São Paulo, with the Banda da Força Pública. Souza Lima performed as the soloist, and the composer conducted. The score is nowadays considered to be lost. A reduction for two pianos was published by Max Eschig in 1934.

During the 50s, Villa-Lobos travelled to Paris to record some pieces of himself, among which was Momoprecoce. It was the only time Villa-Lobos was ever recorded conducting this piece. The piece was recorded at the Théâtre des Champs-Élysées, with Magda Tagliaferro and the Orchestre National de la Radiodiffusion Française, on June 10, 1954. The recording, made under EMI, was released as a collection of discs entitled Villa-Lobos par lui-même.

== Instrumentation ==
Momoprecoce is a fantasy for piano solo and an orchestra consisting of a piccolo, a flute, an oboe, an English horn, a B♭ clarinet, an alto saxophone, a bassoon, a contrabassoon, three French horns, a C trumpet, a trombone, percussion (timpani, a bass drum, a side drum, a Basque drum, a field drum, a snare drum, a children's drum, wooden and metal shakers, sleigh bells, and a reco-reco), a celesta, and a string section.
