= Étude No. 10 (Villa-Lobos) =

Guitar piece by Heitor Villa-Lobos

Heitor Villa-Lobos's Étude No. 10, part of his Twelve Études for Guitar, was first published by Max Eschig, Paris, in 1953.

== History ==
The autograph manuscript of Etude No. 10 is dated 1929, Paris.

== Structure ==
The piece is in B minor and is marked Très animé – un peu animé – vif.

== Analysis ==
Étude No. 10 is a study in technique that presents great challenges to the player. It is in ternary form (ABA), but the return of the opening material is transformed into dance-like rhythmic cells. An unusual technical feature is the use of the right-hand little finger.
