= Étude No. 4 (Villa-Lobos) =

1953 guitar étude written by Heitor Villa-Lobos

Heitor Villa-Lobos's Étude No. 4 ("de acordes repetidos"), part of his Twelve Études for Guitar, was first published by Max Eschig, Paris, in 1953.

== Structure ==
The piece shows the influence of folk guitar music, is in G major, and is marked Un peu modéré (Santos 1985, 23).

== Analysis ==
Étude No. 4 is a chord study, but does not employ all of the harmonic and polyphonic resources of the instrument (Santos 1985, 23).
