= Miniaturas (Villa-Lobos) =

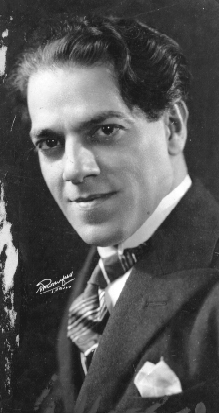
Heitor Villa-Lobos, c. 1922

Miniaturas, W056 (from Portuguese: MIniatures), is a set of six songs for voice and piano by Brazilian composer Heitor Villa-Lobos.

== Background ==
The exact dates of composition for Miniaturas is uncertain, but the songs were written sometime between 1907 and 1917. The set was composed before Villa-Lobos's first trip to Europe, and was part of a series of art compositions that the composer was writing at the time, which marked a departure from his early "folk", "pop" style. The best available evidence suggests that the fifth song was composed in March, 1912, in Bahia (or 1907), songs 1, 2, and 6 in 1916, and songs 3 and 4 in 1917. The sixth miniature was originally assigned the opus number 87, whereas the third one was assigned Op. 70. The fifth song, in turn, which was composed much earlier than the rest, was initially entitled Gueixas. Some of the pieces were written in Rio de Janeiro.

The set is dedicated to Henrique Oswald. All texts are in Portuguese, with each song using a different poet: Bernardino Lopes (No. 1), Sílvio Romero (No. 2), Abílio Barreto (No. 3), Alphonsus de Guimaraens (No. 4), Luís Guimarães Filho (No. 5), and António Correia de Oliveira (No. 6). Miniaturas was first published in 1926 by Arthur Napoleão, although the work is now rarely circulated.

The set did not premiere as a set, but rather as individual pieces. Miniatures 1, 4, 5, and 6 premiered on November 17, 1917, in the Salão Nobre of Rio de Janeiro, with singer Alberto Guimarães and Lucilia Villa-Lobos at the piano. Nos. 2 and 3 were premiered on November 12, 1919, in the Theatro Municipal of Rio de Janeiro, with singer Frederico Nascimento Filho and Lucilia Villa-Lobos at the piano.

=== Arrangements ===
Villa-Lobos made a number of arrangements of this piece, some of which were never published. He arranged Miniaturas for voice and orchestra (W057). This arrangement premiered on June 11, 1921, in the Theatro Municipal of Rio de Janeiro, with Frederico Nascimento Filho and Villa-Lobos himself as the conductor. The arrangement was never published and only the autograph versions of the first three miniatures are preserved nowadays.

Chromo No. 2, A viola (retitled as Viola), and Sino da aldeia were originally written for voice and string quartet. The first two pieces premiered on November 12, 1919, in the Theatro Municipal of Rio de Janeiro, with singer Frederico Nascimento Filho, Mario Ronchini and Pery Machado at the violins, Orlando Frederico at the viola, and Newton Pádua at the cello. Viola and Sino da aldeia received a European premiere on April 11, 1924, at the Palais Galliéra, in Paris, with singer Vera Janacópoulos. None of these versions were ever published and only the autograph version and the cello part of Viola is preserved nowadays.

There is also an arrangement of Viola for voice and octet. Although this version was never published, the autograph manuscript is preserved. The Japonesa was also arranged for voice, flute, and piano, but this version was never published either.

== Structure ==
The set consists of six short songs for piano and voice, specifically a baritone. The movement list is as follows:

1. Chromo No. 2
2. A viola
3. Chromo No. 3
4. Sonho
5. Japonesa
6. Sino da aldeia

The version for voice and orchestra was scored for a solo voice (baritone) and an orchestra consisting in two flutes, two oboes, English horn, two clarinets in A, two clarinets in B♭, two bassoons, two horns, timpani, cymbals, celesta, harp, and a standard string section. The version for voice and octet includes two flutes, oboe, and clarinet, even though the rest of the scoring is unknown.

== Recordings ==
After Heitor Villa-Lobos was able to leave Brazil again following the dictator Getúlio Vargas's ousting in 1945, he started touring Europe once again. This led him to record A viola on February 12, 1948, at the Abbey Road Studio No. 3, in London. This performance was given by baritone Frederick Fuller with Villa-Lobos at the piano. Because this cycle was not widely circulated, it has only been recorded a few times and remains difficult to find in recordings. The following is a list of recordings of the piece:

Recordings of Villa-Lobos's Miniaturas
Voice	Piano	Date of recording	Place of recording	Label
Marc Heller	Alfred Heller	March 1992	LRP Studios, New York City, New York, USA	Etcetera
