= Villa-Lobos Museum =

Museum in Rio de Janeiro, Brazil

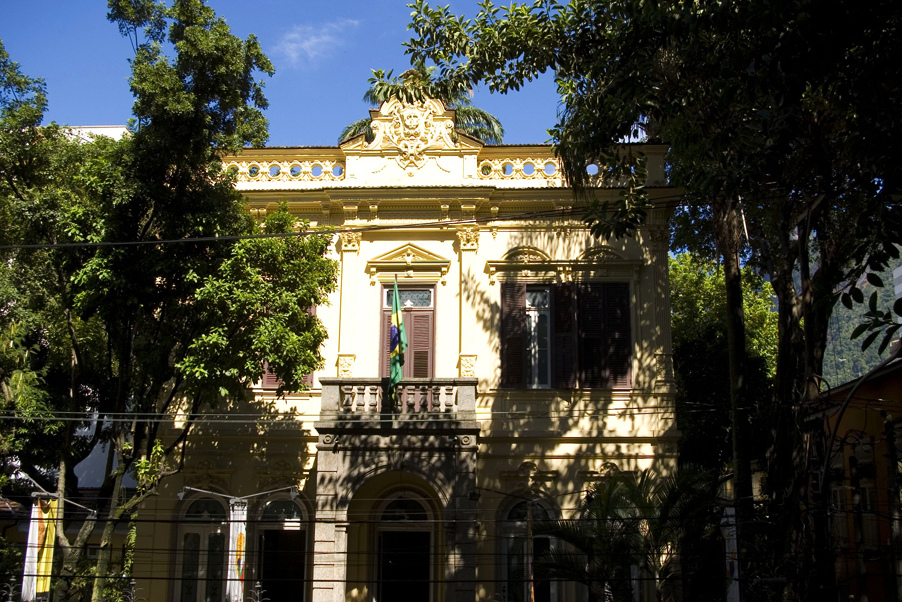
- Established: 1960
- Location: Rio de Janeiro, Brazil
- Coordinates: 22.951870°S 43.190553°W
- Website: museuvillalobos.museus.gov.br

The Villa-Lobos Museum (Portuguese: Museu Villa-Lobos) is a museum in Rio de Janeiro, Brazil, that is dedicated to exhibiting artifacts related to the composer Heitor Villa-Lobos.

== History ==
In 1960, the museum was founded by Arminda Neves d'Almeida, Heitor Villa-Lobos's second wife, who directed the museum for 24 years. The 19th-century building that houses it is listed by the National Institute of Historic and Artistic Heritage. The museum occasionally hosts concerts. In 2019, the museum digitized a collection of photographs it contained, in partnership with Instituto Brasileiro de Museus and Federal University of Goiás. In 2020, it launched a virtual exhibition titled "Native Brazilian Music" containing 50 photographs and audio recordings of Brazilian songs, as well as photographs of musicians in recordings. It was shown at Google Arts & Culture where letters between Leopold Stokowski and Villa-Lobos were shown as well as newspaper clippings. In June 2021, the museum launched a virtual exhibition titled "Memórias de Arminda" about the life of Arminda Neves, which included an adapted version of Google Street View.

== Collections ==
The museum has a collection of objects and documents about the life and work of Heitor Villa-Lobos; a collection of musical instruments, books and scores; recordings and tapes; and a collection of conducting batons.
