= Suite populaire brésilienne =

Composition by Heitor Villa-Lobos

- by Heitor Villa-Lobos
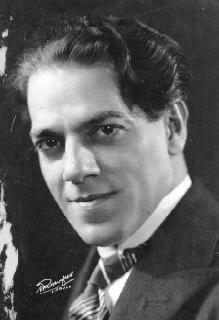
- Heitor Villa-Lobos
- Catalogue: W020
- Composed: First version: 1928; Final version: 1954
- Duration: 20 minutes approximately
- Movements: First version: 4 Final version: 5
- Scoring: Solo guitar

Suite populaire brésilienne (French: Brazilian popular suite), sometimes also referred to by its title in Portuguese Suíte popular brasileira, is a suite for solo guitar by Brazilian composer Heitor Villa-Lobos.

== Background ==
Despite being primarily taught to play the cello as a young child by his father, who was an amateur musician, Villa-Lobos later mainly taught himself how to play the guitar at home. Even though he didn't pursue an academic musical career, his remarkable skills opened the doors to various chorões in Rio de Janeiro. In his early days, he would perform and improvise with other chorões in cafés, nightclubs, and cinemas in order to make his living. This later enabled him to compose many pieces inspired by the musical style and folk material of chorões, entitled chôros.

=== First version (1929) ===
The creative process of Suite populaire brésilienne took many years, as the different movements that make up the suite were never conceived to be put together. Instead, Villa-Lobos, a composer who wrote at the guitar, wrote many small pieces and some of them were later adapted into the suite. The Suite was initially completed for publication in the summer of 1928, while he was on vacation at Lussac-les-Châteaux with his wife, Lucilia Guimarães, visiting Spanish pianist Tomás Terán. Villa-Lobos confessed to Eugène Cools, the then-director of Éditions Max Eschig, in a letter dated July 28, 1928, that not a page of music had been composed, and he was busy with his kites, one of his favorite pastimes. A few days later, however, he asked Cools for a complete set of guitar strings, as his guitar had no usable strings to compose with. He then dedicated to composing and was able to present the two manuscripts of both the Suite and the 12 études in autumn that same year. Both works were mentioned in two contracts between Villa-Lobos and Max Eschig from October 1, 1928, and January 5, 1929. Each one of the dances has different dedicatées, some dances not including any dedicatées at all: the first dance is dedicated to Maria Thereza Terán, Tomás's wife; the second dance is dedicated to Francis Boyle; the third dance is dedicated to Madeleine Reclus, Paul Reclus's daughter; and the fourth dance is dedicated to Eduardo Burnay.

This, however, did not turn out how Villa-Lobos expected. When Villa-Lobos came back to Brazil, supposedly for a brief series of concerts on June 15, 1930, he would not be able to return because of a coup d'état where dictator Getúlio Vargas became president. Although Villa-Lobos tried to go back to Paris, he could not do so until 1948, when the political turmoil generated by World War II had dissipated. Because of this 18-year hiatus, Villa-Lobos and his publisher distanced from one another, and Villa-Lobos was unaware that his compositions had not been published when he arrived in France. Villa-Lobos, in fact, had asked Max Eschig's director if he could send Villa-Lobos a few copies of his own Suite, to which he received no answer.

=== Revised version (1954) ===
Upon resuming his relationship with his publisher, he tried to get his compositions for guitar published, and started rewriting his Suite from his own sketches. Although he repeatedly asked the then-director of Max Eschig, Philippe Marietti, about the whereabouts of his original manuscripts destined for publication, the manuscripts were not found and he decided to send new manuscripts to the copyist in 1948. While it was fairly easy for Villa-Lobos to reconstruct his études because of the readily available material he owned at the time, the Suite was more challenging to re-compose, and this is made evident by the fact that the fourth movement, the "Valse-Chôro", was lost (Villa-Lobos only had sketches of bars 78 to 104) and the composer had to start from scratch more than twenty years after composing it. This is why the title was translated into Portuguese in the final version of the suite.

Villa-Lobos is conflicting about the dates of completion for each of the movements. While he provided no dates for the movement except for movements I and II (1906 and 1907 respectively) in the preliminary version, he did provide dates on the final revised version: according to Villa-Lobos own specifications in the published version of the score, movements I and II were composed in 1908 in Rio de Janeiro, movements III and IV in 1912, also in Rio, and movement V was finished in 1923 in Paris. Movements III and IV were completely new. The final version of the suite was eventually published by Max Eschig in 1955. The lost fourth movement from the first preliminary set was eventually found many years after the composer's death, in 2006, in the archives of Villa-Lobos's publisher.

Since Villa-Lobos could not get a copy of the manuscript he sent to his publisher and had to recompose the pieces from old sketches, the dedicatées varied slightly: the first dance was again dedicated to Maria Thereza Terán and the fifth (the third dance in the previous unpublished set) was also dedicated to Madeleine Reclus. The other three dances were left with no dedication.

== Structure ==
All the movements in the suite are chôros, pieces of music that meant to re-phrase and synthesize native Brazilian folk material. It has a total duration of 20 minutes approximately. The first, initially unpublished version, had four choros, whereas the final version had five. The movement list is as follows:

Suite populaire brésilienne, 1928 version

1. Mazourka-Chôro. Un peu lent
2. Schottische-Chôro. Un peu modéré — Un peu moins — Poco lento
3. Chorinho (Petit Chôro). Lent — Più mosso — Lent
4. Valse-Chôro. Très lent — Plus vite — Un peu animé

Suite populaire brésilienne, 1948—54 version

1. Mazurka-Chôro. Un peu lent — Meno — Tempo primo — A tempo (Final)
2. Schottisch-Chôro. Un peu modéré — Un peu moins — Poco meno — Tempo primo
3. Valsa-Chôro. Valsa lenta — Più mosso — Tempo primo
4. Gavotta-Chôro. Allegretto moderato
5. Chôrinho. Lent — Più mosso — Tempo primo

All pieces in this suite have a certain sentimental and melancholic tone (the word chôro comes from the Portuguese term chorar, which means "to cry" or "to complain"). In this sense, as other typical choros, all dances have a generally steady tempo and follow the typical rondo form pattern where the first phrase is repeated (ABACA). A common practice at the time in Brazil, the dances in the suite blend Brazilian folk music with European dances.

The first dance is a slow 65-bar mazurka in A minor and 3/4, the C section modulating to A major. It ends after a final coda. The second dance is a 112-bar schottische, a bit livelier than the previous dance, and in 2/4. It is in E major, modulating to C-sharp minor in the B section and A major in the C section. The third dance is a slow 163-bar valse, in E minor and 3/4. It modulates to A minor in the B section and A major in the C section. The fourth dance is a 128-bar gavotte, the fastest in the suite, marked Allegretto moderato. It is in D major and, briefly modulating to B minor in the B section and F-sharp minor in the C section. The final dance is a 105-bar chôro in C major and 2/4, modulating to A major in the central section.

The dances that were also used in the preliminary version of the suite are slightly different in some ways: the first dance changes the phrasing and the accompaniment in some bars and deletes the coda altogether, the second and third dances make changes in some notes, and the fourth movement is a completely new dance.

== Recordings ==
Recordings of the whole suite from 1928 are very rare. The following is a list of recordings of the suite finished in 1954:

- Norbert Kraft recorded the piece in 1998 under Naxos. The recording was taken at St. John Crysostom Church, in Newmarket, Canada and was released straight to compact disc.
- Frédéric Zigante, who also edited the piece when it was published, recorded the piece in an all-Villa-Lobos album release on compact disc in 2011 by Brilliant Classics. In this album, he also performed the discarded movement from the first version of the suite.
