= Étude No. 2 (Villa-Lobos) =

Heitor Villa-Lobos's Étude No. 2, part of his Twelve Études for Guitar, was first published by Max Eschig, Paris, in 1953.

== Structure ==
The piece is in A major and is marked Allegro. A strong presence of J. S. Bach's Well-Tempered Clavier suggests a miniature Bachianas Brasileiras.

== Analysis ==
Étude No. 2 is a study in slurred notes and arpeggios, developing a musical idea by Dionisio Aguado. A passage of great fingering difficulty occurs at the end, where Villa-Lobos combines harmonics and normal notes.
