= Étude No. 5 (Villa-Lobos) =

Heitor Villa-Lobos's Étude No. 5, part of his Twelve Études for Guitar, was first published by Max Eschig, Paris, in 1953.

== History ==
The autograph manuscript of Etude No. 5, held by the Yale University Library, is dated 1929, France, and is dedicated to Andrés Segovia.

== Structure ==
The piece is in C major and is marked Andantino.

== Analysis ==
Étude No. 5 is a contrapuntal study. The deliberately monotonous accompaniment in broken thirds contrasts with the melody, played on the treble strings.
