= Nonet (Villa-Lobos) =

- Impressão rápida de todo o Brasil
- by Heitor Villa-Lobos
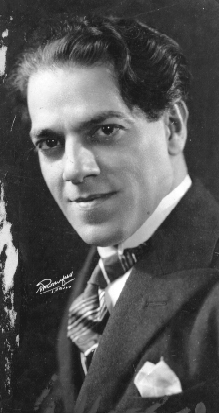
- Heitor Villa-Lobos
- English: A Rapid Impression of the Whole of Brazil
- Catalogue: W191
- Form: Chôros
- Composed: 1923 – September 1923: Rio de Janeiro and Paris
- Dedication: Olivia Guedes Penteado
- Published: 1929: Paris
- Publisher: Max Eschig
- Recorded: 1941 Schola Cantorum; Brazilian Festival Orchestra; Hugh Ross, conductor. Victor Red Seal DM 773 (17976–17980; matrix 057036–057044).
- Duration: 14 min
- Scoring: Flute (doubling piccolo), oboe, clarinet, alto saxophone (doubling baritone saxophone), bassoon, harp, celesta, piano, and percussion, with mixed choir

Premiere
- Date: 30 May 1924
- Location: Salle des Agriculteurs, Paris
- Conductor: Heitor Villa-Lobos
- Performers: Louis Fleury, flute; Louis Gaudard, oboe; Henri Delacroix, clarinet; Raymond Briard, saxophone; Gustave Dhérin, bassoon; G. Truc, celesta; João de Souza Lima, piano; L. Perret, harp; M. Caillette and Désiré-Émile Inghelbrecht, percussion; Mixed Choir of Paris

Nonet, subtitled "Impressão rápida de todo o Brasil" (A rapid impression of the whole of Brazil) is a chamber-music work (with mixed choir) by the Brazilian composer Heitor Villa-Lobos, written in 1923. It is number W191 in the catalogue of works compiled by David Appleby.

== History ==
Villa-Lobos began work on the Nonet in Rio de Janeiro in 1923, shortly before his first visit to Europe, and completed the score in Paris in September of the same year. It was premiered on 30 May 1924 at the Salle des Agriculteurs in Paris by an ensemble conducted by the composer. The score is dedicated to Olívia Guedes Penteado.

The work marks a fundamental turning point in Villa-Lobos's style to the strongly Brazilian-nationalistic character that dominated his compositions throughout the rest of the 1920s, and in particular those to which he gave the title Chôros.

== Instrumentation ==
The nonet is scored for flute (doubling piccolo), oboe, clarinet, alto saxophone (doubling baritone saxophone), bassoon, harp, celesta, piano, and a large percussion battery (requiring at least two players): timpani, tam-tam, bass drum, large bass drum, field drum, side drum, cymbal, bronze and crockery plates, chocalhos (wood and metal), triangle, reco-reco (small and large), puíta, tambourines (small and large), caxambu, and xylophone. In addition to this instrumental nonet, the score calls for a SAATBarB mixed choir, sometimes divided further into as many a twelve separate parts.

== Analysis ==
The Nonet is in a single movement and relies for its effect on colouristic and rhythmic devices more than on structural or harmonic elements. The score is multi-sectional and constructed like a mosaic, presenting short melodic and rhythmic fragments superimposed and in rapid succession. There are eight large sections encompassing approximately twenty-five short episodes, though because of the lack of traditional harmony and thematic structure such numbers are rather arbitrary. The result is a rhapsodic, improvisational atmosphere, which is also reflected in the treatment of the voices. Despite its intense nationalism, the harmonic language of the Nonet takes full advantage of the "advanced" chromatic and quartal dissonant formations of the 1920s, while at the same time showing the strong influence of Debussy. Despite the composer's vehement denial of influences from other composers, the impact of the Rite of Spring is also evident from the opening bars of the Nonet, which suggests that a substantial amount of work on the piece was completed after Villa-Lobos first heard Stravinsky's work in Paris.
