= Étude No. 1 (Villa-Lobos) =

- Étude by Heitor Villa-Lobos
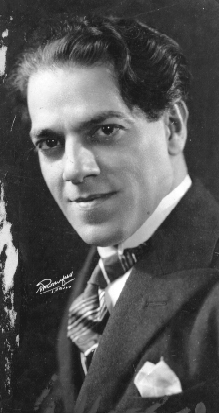
- Heitor Villa-Lobos
- Key: E minor
- Catalogue: W235
- Form: through-composed
- Composed: 1928: Paris
- Dedication: Andrés Segovia
- Published: 1953: Paris
- Publisher: Max Eschig
- Recorded: 27 June 1949 Andrés Segovia (issued on Villa-Lobos: Two Studies [Nos. 1 and 8]. 1 disc, 78rpm, 12 inch, monaural. Columbia L.X. 1229 (matrix nos. CAX 10567; CAX 10570). England: Columbia Records.
- Duration: 2 mins.
- Movements: 1
- Scoring: guitar

Premiere
- Date: 5 March 1947:
- Location: Wellesley College, Wellesley, Massachusetts
- Performers: Andrés Segovia, guitar

Heitor Villa-Lobos's Étude No. 1, part of his 12 Studies for Guitar, was first published by Max Eschig, Paris, in 1953.

== History ==
The first public performance of this étude (together with those of Études 7 and 8) was given by Andrés Segovia on 5 March 1947 at Wellesley College in Wellesley, Massachusetts.

== Structure ==
The piece is in E minor and is marked Allegro non troppo. A strong presence of J. S. Bach's Well-Tempered Clavier suggests a miniature Bachiana Brasileira.

== Analysis ==
Étude No. 1 is an arpeggio study that is predominantly focused on a cross-string right-hand technique with the exception of one scalar passage from measure 23 to 24 and a series of cadential harmonics in measures 31 to 32.
