= Uirapuru (Villa-Lobos) =

1917–1934 orchestral piece by Heitor Villa-Lobos

- O passarinho encantado
- by Heitor Villa-Lobos
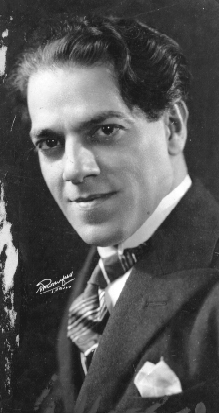
- Heitor Villa-Lobos
- English: (subtitle) The Enchanted Little Bird
- Catalogue: W 133
- Composed: 1917–1934: Rio de Janeiro
- Dedication: Serge Lifar
- Published: 1948: New York
- Publisher: Associated Music Publishers
- Duration: 20 mins.
- Movements: 1
- Scoring: Orchestra

Premiere
- Date: 25 May 1935:
- Location: Teatro Colón, Buenos Aires
- Conductor: Heitor Villa-Lobos
- Performers: Michel Borovsky, Dora del Grande, orchestra and corps de ballet of the Teatro Colón

Uirapuru (subtitled O passarinho encantado, "The Enchanted Little Bird") is a symphonic poem or ballet by the Brazilian composer Heitor Villa-Lobos, begun as a revision of an earlier work in 1917 and completed in 1934. A recording conducted by the composer lasts 20 minutes and 33 seconds.

== History ==
Uirapuru originated as a fifteen-minute symphonic poem titled Tédio de alvorada (Boredom at Dawn), composed in Rio de Janeiro in 1916 and first performed there on a concert sponsored by the Associação Brasileira de Imprensa for the benefit of retired journalists, at the Theatro Municipal on 15 May 1918 by an orchestra made up of 85 music teachers, conducted by Soriano Robert.

Villa-Lobos extensively reworked and expanded this composition into the score retitled Uirapuru, beginning in 1917. However, it was not until Serge Lifar and his ensemble danced the ballets Jurupari (to the music of Chôros No. 10) and Amazonas in 1934 that Villa-Lobos completed Uirapuru and dedicated the score to Lifar. In the end, however, Lifar was not involved in the ballet's premiere.

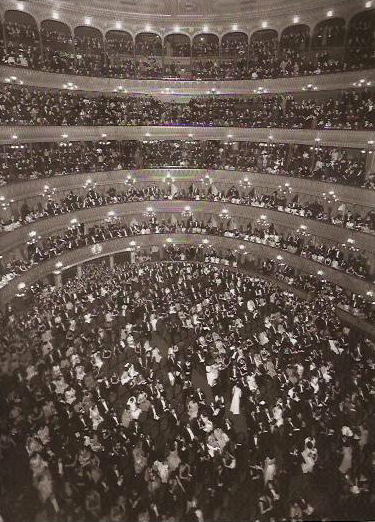
A 1935 gala at the Teatro Colón, possibly the one at which Uirapuru was premiered

The newly finished score was performed for the first time on Argentina's Día de la Revolución de Mayo, 25 May 1935, as a ballet choreographed by Ricardo Nemanoff and with stage design by Héctor Balsadúa, at the Teatro Colón in Buenos Aires. The occasion was a gala in honour of the Brazilian President Getúlio Vargas during a visit to Argentina for the Fifth Pan-American Commercial Conference which started the next day. The ballet was danced on this occasion by Michel Borovsky and Dora del Grande, with the orchestra and corps de ballet of the Teatro Colón, conducted by the composer.

The first concert performance as a symphonic poem took place a few months later, on 6 November 1935 in the Theatro Municipal in Rio de Janeiro, by the Orquestra Sinfônica do Theatro Municipal conducted by the composer. Uirapuru was also included on the programme of the last concert conducted by Villa-Lobos, on 12 July 1959, at the Empire State Music Festival in New York.

== Score ==
The title page of the autograph manuscript reads “Uirapuru / (O passaro encantado)/ Bailado brasileiro"// "H. Villa-Lobos/ Rio, 1917"// "A Serge Lifar"// "(Le petit oiseau enchanté)”, but bears on its last page the inscription "Fim, Rio 1917, reformado em 1934". The completion date of 1917, also given in the official catalogue of works, is improbable in view of two facts: the subsequent 1918 premiere of Tédio de alvorada, and the fact that the new score was not first performed until 18 years later, in 1935. It has been suggested that the composer gave the earlier date in order not to be thought under the influence of Igor Stravinsky, whose music he came to know at first hand only during his first European visit in 1923.

On the other hand, a sketch page for the earlier composition almost certainly dating from 1916 includes drafts of material only incorporated later in Uirapuru, in particular the octatonic "handsome indian theme", which suggests that such a scale was indeed already familiar to Villa-Lobos before his earliest contact with the music of Stravinsky.

== Instrumentation ==
Uirapuru is scored for an orchestra consisting of piccolo, 2 flutes, 2 oboes, cor anglais, 2 clarinets, bass clarinet, 2 bassoons, contrabassoon, soprano saxophone, 4 horns, 3 trumpets, 3 trombones, tuba, percussion (timpani, tam-tam, tubular bells, reco-reco, coco, floor tom, tamborim, cymbals, bass drum, xylophone, celesta, and glockenspiel), 2 harps, piano, violinophone, and strings.

== Analysis ==
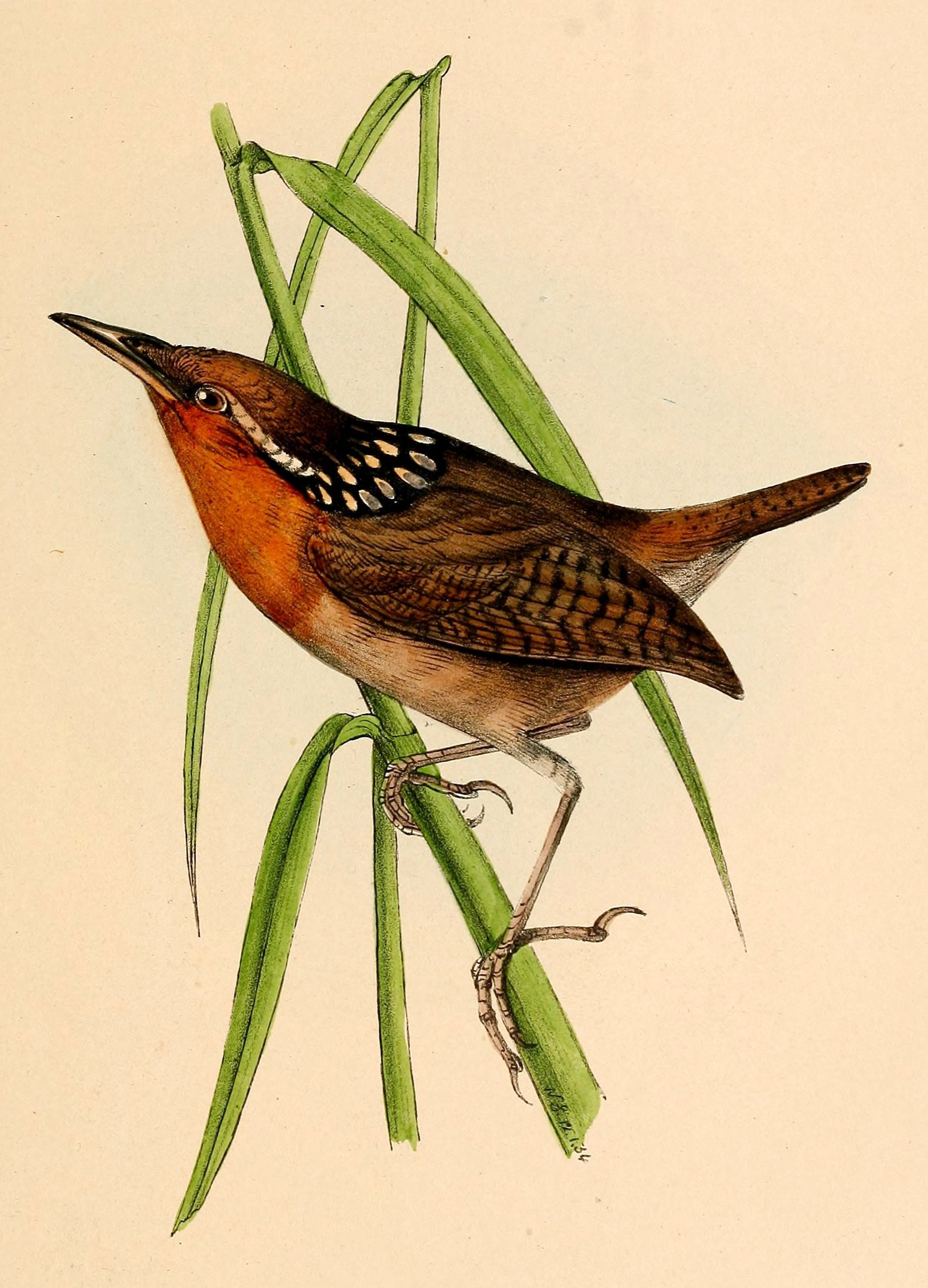
The Uirapuru

"Uirapuru" is a name, derived from the Tupi language, applied to various members of the bird family Pipridae found in Brazil. The bird whose song Villa-Lobos used as a compositional theme is Cyphorhinus arada, the uirapuru-verdadeiro or musician wren, also known as the organ wren or quadrille wren, a bird with an astonishing variety of song patterns. Villa-Lobos likely based his uirapuru theme on a transcription made during an expedition in 1849–50 by the British botanist Richard Spruce, and published in 1908.

The work falls into two large parts (b. 1–134 and 134–382), suggesting a binary form (especially with the repeat of the entire section A) but the form is created cumulatively from a succession of fifteen thematically based smaller sections (four in the first part and eleven in the second) in a non-functional harmonic context.
