= Piano Concerto No. 5 (Villa-Lobos) =

- Concerto by Heitor Villa-Lobos
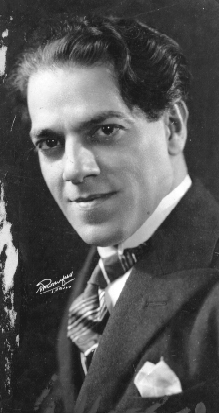
- Heitor Villa-Lobos
- Catalogue: W521
- Composed: 1954: Rio de Janeiro, Paris, New York
- Dedication: Felicja Blumental
- Published: 1984: Paris (reduction for two pianos)
- Publisher: Max Eschig
- Recorded: 25 May 1955 Felicja Blumental, piano; Vienna Symphony, conducted by Heitor Villa-Lobos).
- Duration: 19 min
- Movements: Four
- Scoring: piano; orchestra

Premiere
- Date: 8 May 1955
- Location: Royal Festival Hall, London
- Conductor: Jean Martinon
- Performers: Felicja Blumental, piano; London Philharmonic Orchestra

The Piano Concerto No. 5, W 521, is a piano concerto by the Brazilian composer Heitor Villa-Lobos, written in 1954. One performance recorded under the composer's baton lasts about 19 minutes.

The concerto was composed in 1954 in Rio de Janeiro. It was commissioned by Felicja Blumental, to whom the score is dedicated, and who gave the first performance at the Royal Festival Hall in London on 8 May 1955, with the London Philharmonic Orchestra, conducted by Jean Martinon.

== Instrumentation ==
The work is scored for solo piano and an orchestra consisting of piccolo, 2 flutes, 2 oboes, cor anglais, 2 clarinets, bass clarinet, 2 bassoons, contrabassoon, 4 horns, 2 trumpets, 3 trombones, tuba, percussion (timpani, bass drum, and xylophone), celesta, harp, and strings.

== Analysis ==
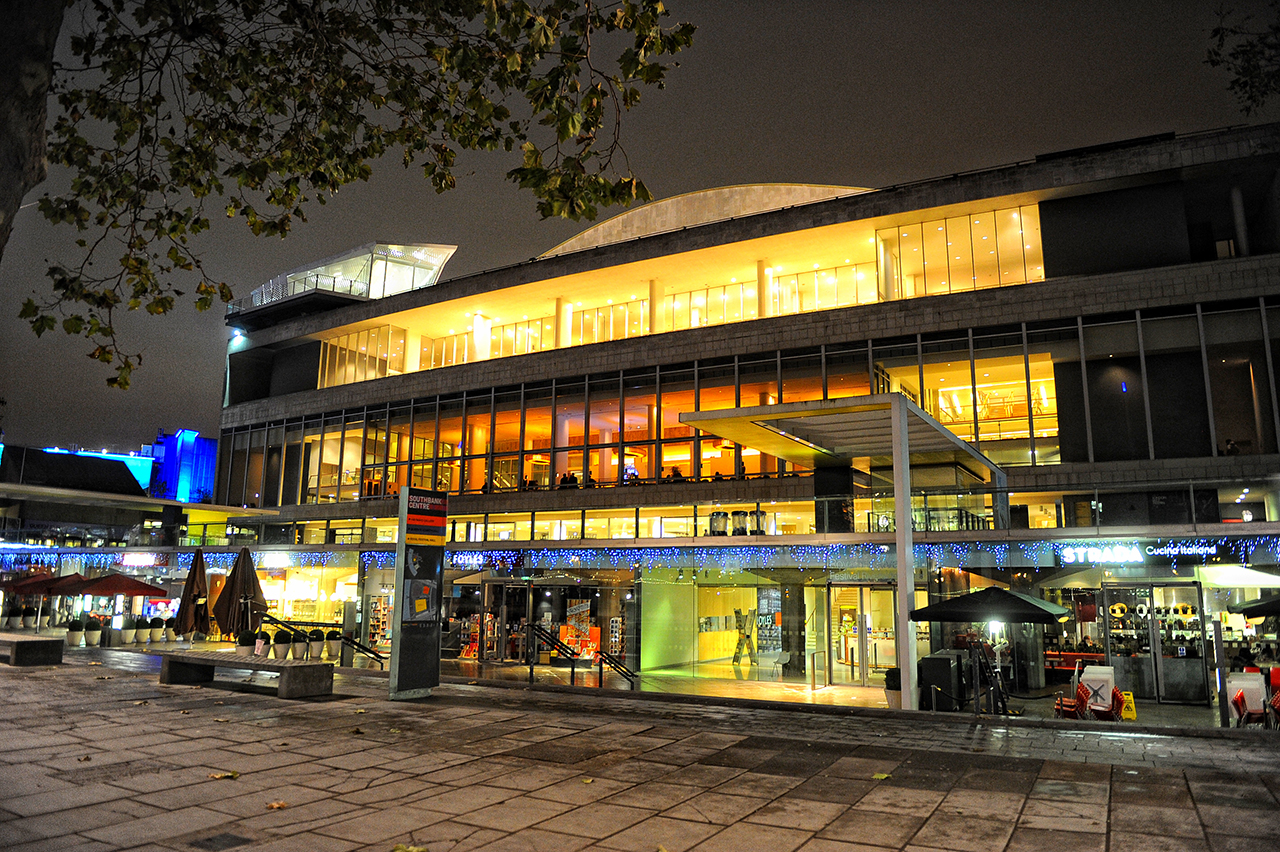
Royal Festival Hall, London, venue of the concerto's premiere

The concerto has four movements:

1. Allegro non troppo
2. Poco adagio
3. Allegretto scherzando – Cadenza
4. Allegretto

The first movement is in sonata-allegro form. After an orchestral introduction featuring a mirror motif, the main theme enters at rehearsal number 3. It is in A minor and resembles a slow waltz, alternating 3/4 and 6/8 metres. A bridge, in which the opening mirror motif is played by the piano, leads to the second, chromatic, Gershwinesque theme at rehearsal no. 11, in the distant key of G♯ minor. A return of the main theme at rehearsal no. 15 is followed by a third theme in C minor, at rehearsal no. 18, closing the exposition section.

== Recordings ==
- Heitor Villa-Lobos: Concerto for Piano No. 5. Felicja Blumental, piano; Vienna Symphony, conducted by Heitor Villa-Lobos. Recorded live at the Musikverein, Vienna, Austria, on 25 May 1955. LP recording.
  - Reissued on CD (coupled with Isaac Albéniz: Piano Concerto No. 1 in A minor, Op. 78, with the Orchestra di Torino, conducted by Alberto Zedda). Dureco: Ars Classium 1159302. Weesp, Netherlands: P & C Dureco, 1994.
  - Reissued as part of a 5-CD set, Brana Records Collection Vol 1: Felicja Blumenthal, Piano (with other works by Villa-Lobos, as well as compositions by Camargo Guarnieri, Francisco Mignone, Heckel Tavares, Ludwig van Beethoven, Carl Czerny, Ferdinand Ries, Carl Stamitz, and Georg Joseph Vogler. Brana 29. Perivale, Middlesex: Brana Records, 2007. Disc no. 1 (with the concerto) also released separately, as Brana BR0001. Perivale, Middlesex: Brana Records, 2007.
- Heitor Villa-Lobos: Symphonie no 4: Vitoria; Concerto no 5 en ut majeur. Felicja Blumenthal, piano; Orchestre national de la radiodiffusion française, conducted by Heitor Villa-Lobos. Concerto recorded at the Salle de la Mutualité, Paris, on 8 June 1955. LP recording, 1 audio disc: analog, 33⅓ rpm, 12 in., monaural. Columbia FCX 438. [France]: Columbia, 1957. Also issued on Angel LP 424 in Brazil.
  - Re-issued on LP as part of: Villa-Lobos par lui-même. Various performers, orchestras conducted by Heitor Villa-Lobos. Eleven audio discs: 10 LPs, analog, 33⅓ rpm, 12 in., monaural; 1 analog, 45 rpm, 7 in., monaural. EMI/La voix de son maître VSM 14090–99. France: La voix de Son maître, 1976.
  - Set reissued on CD, 6 audio discs: analogue/digital, 4¾ in., monaural. EMI CZS 7 67229 2 (CDZ 7 67230 2 – CDZ 7 672135 2). France: EMI, 1991.
  - Reissued on CD, with Villa-Lobos: Symphony No. 4 "Momoprecôce", and Chôros No. 5. Urania Widescreen Collection WS 121.133. Piva: Manzoni Editore, 2011.
- Heitor Villa-Lobos: 5 concertos para piano e orquestra. Fernando Lopes, piano; Orquestra Sinfônica Municipal de Campinas; conducted by Benito Juarez. Recorded 18–24 June 1984, in the Teatro Interno do Centro de Covivência Cultural da Campinas. LP recording, 4 discs: 12 inch, 33⅓ rpm, stereo. Energia de São Paulo: LPVL 01/25 – LPVL 04/25. São Paulo: Energia de São Paulo, [1984?].
- Heitor Villa-Lobos: Five Piano Concertos. Cristina Ortiz, piano; Royal Philharmonic Orchestra, conducted by Miguel Ángel Gómez Martínez. Recorded at the Walthamstow Assembly Hall in October 1989, January and July 1990. 2-CD set: stereo. London 430 628-2 (430 629-2 and 430 630-2). London: The Decca Record Company Limited, 1992.
- Heitor Villa-Lobos: Cinco Conciertos para Piano y Orquesta. Elvira Santiago, piano (Concerto No. 1); Ulises Hernández, piano (Concerto No. 2); Patricio Malcolm, piano (Concerto No. 3); Harold López-Nussa, piano (Concerto No. 4); Roberto Urbay, piano (Concerto No. 5); Orquesta Sinfónica Nacional de Cuba, conducted by Enrique Pérez Mesa. Concerto No. 5 recorded at the Teatro Auditorium Amadeo Roldán, Havana, Cuba, 10 December 2003, as part of the XXV Festival Internacional del Nuevo Cine Latinoamericano. 2 CDs + 1 DVD. Colibrí DVD/CD 050. Havana: Colibrí, 2006.
