= String Quartet No. 9 (Villa-Lobos) =

Works by Heitor Villa-Lobos

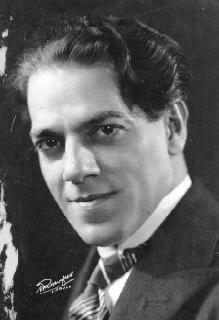
Heitor Villa-Lobos

String Quartet No. 9 is part of a series of seventeen works in the medium by the Brazilian composer Heitor Villa-Lobos.

Villa-Lobos composed his Ninth Quartet in Rio de Janeiro in 1945. It was first performed in London in 1947, but the exact date, place, and performers are not known. The first performance in the composer's native country took place at the Auditório do MEC in Rio de Janeiro on 25 April 1960, as part of the Festival Villa-Lobos. The performers on this occasion were the Quarteto de Cordas da Rádio MEC. The score is dedicated to Mindinha (Arminda Neves d'Almeida), the composer's companion for the last 23 years of his life.

A typical performance lasts approximately 25 minutes.

== Analysis ==
The quartet consists of four movements:

1. Allegro
2. Andantino vagaroso
3. Allegro poco moderato (con bravura)
4. Molto allegro

The first movement is cast in the traditional sonata-allegro form, with a particularly strong influence from Joseph Haydn. This is seen especially in the use of mirroring that recalls the al rovescio counterpoint of the fugue in Haydn's Op. 20, No. 2. The second theme group contains four subjects, the second of which uses the octatonic scale, suggesting the possible influence of Stravinsky. The second movement, on the other hand, shows remarkable similarities to Alban Berg's Lyric Suite and to Béla Bartók's Sixth Quartet.

== Discography ==
Chronological, by date of recording.

- Heitor Villa-Lobos: String Quartets Nos. 5, 9 and 12. Danubius Quartet (Gyöngyvér Oláh and Adél Miklós, violins; Cecilia Bodolai, viola; Ilona Ribli, cello). Recorded at the Rottenbiller Street Studio in Budapest from 18 to 23 May 1992. CD recording, 1 disc: digital, 12 cm, stereo. Marco Polo 8.223392. A co-production with Records International. Germany: HH International, Ltd., 1993.
- Heitor Villa-Lobos: Quartetos de cordas 7, 8, 9, 10, 11. Quarteto Amazônia. CD recording, 2 discs: digital, 12 cm, stereo. Barcelona: Discmedi D.L., 2000.
  - Also issued as part of Villa-Lobos: Os 17 quartetos de cordas / The 17 String Quartets. Quarteto Bessler-Reis and Quarteto Amazônia. CD recording, 6 sound discs: digital, 12 cm, stereo. Kuarup Discos KCX-1001 (KCD 045, M-KCD-034, KCD 080/1, KCD-051, KCD 042). Rio de Janeiro: Kuarup Discos, 1996.
- Villa-Lobos: String Quartets, Volume 6. Quartets Nos. 4, 9, 11. Cuarteto Latinoamericano (Saúl Bitrán, Arón Bitrán, violins; Javier Montiel, viola; Alvaro Bitrán, cello). Recorded at the Sala Blas Galindo of the Centro Nacional de las Artes in Mexico City, 31 July – 3 August 2000. Music of Latin American Masters. CD recording, 1 disc: digital, 12 cm, stereo. Dorian DOR-93229. Troy, NY: Dorian Recordings, 2001.
  - Reissued as part of Heitor Villa-Lobos: The Complete String Quartets. 6 CDs + 1 DVD with a performance of Quartet No. 1 and interview with the Cuarteto Latinoamericano. Dorian Sono Luminus. DSL-90904. Winchester, VA: Sono Luminus, 2009.
  - Also reissued (without the DVD) on Brilliant Classics 6634.

== Filmography ==
- Villa-Lobos: A integral dos quartetos de cordas. Quarteto Radamés Gnattali (Carla Rincón, Francisco Roa, violins; Fernando Thebaldi, viola; Hugo Pilger, cello); presented by Turibio Santos. Recorded from June 2010 to September 2011 at the Palácio do Catete, Palácio das Laranjeiras, and the Theatro Municipal, Rio de Janeiro. DVD and Blu-ray (VIBD11111), 3 discs. Rio de Janeiro: Visom Digital, 2012.
