= Heitor Villa-Lobos =

Brazilian composer (1887–1959)

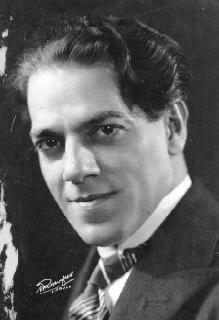
- Heitor Villa-Lobos, c. 1922
- Born: Heitor Villa-Lobos; March 5, 1887; Rio de Janeiro, Empire of Brazil
- Died: November 17, 1959 (aged 72); Rio de Janeiro, Brazil
- Occupation: Composer

Heitor Villa-Lobos (Note: Pronunciation: UK: /ˌvɪləˈloʊbɒs, ˌviːlɑːˈ-/, US: /ˌviːləˈloʊboʊs, -bəs, -boʊʃ, ˌviːlɑːˈlɔːbʊs/, Portuguese: [ejˈtoʁ ˌvilɐ ˈlobuʃ]) (March 5, 1887 – November 17, 1959) was a Brazilian composer, conductor, cellist, and classical guitarist described as "the single most significant creative figure in 20th-century Brazilian art music". Villa-Lobos has globally become one of the most recognizable South American composers in music history. A prolific composer, he wrote many orchestral, chamber, instrumental and vocal works, totaling over 2,000 pieces by his death in 1959. His music was influenced by both Brazilian folk music and stylistic elements from the European classical tradition, as exemplified by his Bachianas Brasileiras (Brazilian Bach-pieces) and his Chôros. His Etudes for classical guitar (1929), dedicated to Andrés Segovia, and his 5 Preludes (1940), dedicated to his spouse Arminda Neves d'Almeida, a.k.a. "Mindinha", are important works in the classical guitar repertory.

== Biography ==
=== Youth and exploration ===
Villa-Lobos was born in Rio de Janeiro. His father, Raúl, was a civil servant, an educated man of Spanish extraction, a librarian, and an amateur astronomer and musician. In Villa-Lobos's early childhood, Brazil underwent a period of social revolution and modernisation, abolishing slavery in 1888 and overthrowing the Empire of Brazil in 1889. The changes in Brazil were reflected in its musical life: previously European music had been the dominant influence, and the courses at the Conservatório de Música were grounded in traditional counterpoint and harmony. Villa-Lobos underwent very little of this formal training. After a few abortive harmony lessons, he learnt music by illicit observation from the top of the stairs of the regular musical evenings at his house arranged by his father. He learned to play the cello, clarinet, and classical guitar. When his father died suddenly in 1899, he earned a living for his family by playing in cinema and theatre orchestras in Rio.

Around 1905 Villa-Lobos started explorations of Brazil's "dark interior", absorbing the native Brazilian musical culture. Serious doubt has been cast on some of Villa-Lobos's tales of the decade or so he spent on these expeditions, and about his capture and near escape from cannibals, with some believing them to be fabrications or wildly embellished romanticism. After this period, he gave up any idea of conventional training and instead absorbed the musical influences of Brazil's indigenous cultures, as well as traditions based on Portuguese, African, and American Indian elements. His earliest compositions were the result of improvisations on the classical guitar from this period.

Villa-Lobos played with many local Brazilian street-music bands; he was also influenced by the cinema and Ernesto Nazareth's improvised tangos and polkas. For a time Villa-Lobos became a cellist in a Rio opera company, and his early compositions include attempts at Grand Opera. Encouraged by Arthur Napoleão, a pianist and music publisher, he decided to compose seriously.

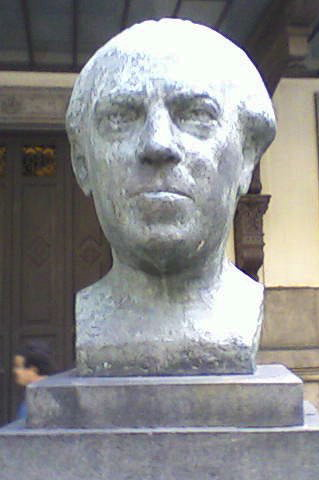
Villa-Lobos statue next to Rio de Janeiro's Municipal Theater

=== Brazilian influences ===
On November 12, 1913, Villa-Lobos married the pianist Lucília Guimarães, ended his travels, and began his career as a serious musician. Up until his marriage, he had not learned to play the piano, so his wife taught him the rudiments of the instrument. His music began to be published in 1913. He introduced some of his compositions in a series of occasional chamber concerts (later also orchestral concerts) from 1915–1921, mainly in Rio de Janeiro's Salão Nobre do Jornal do Comércio.

The music presented at these concerts shows his coming to terms with the conflicting elements in his experience, and overcoming a crisis of identity, as to whether European or Brazilian music would dominate his style. This was decided by 1916, the year in which he composed the symphonic poems Amazonas and Tédio de alvorada, the first version of what would become Uirapurú (although Amazonas was not performed until 1929, and Uirapurú was only completed in 1934 and first performed in 1935). These works drew from native Brazilian legends and the use of "primitive" folk material.

European influences did still inspire Villa-Lobos. In 1917 Sergei Diaghilev made an impact on tour in Brazil with his Ballets Russes. That year Villa-Lobos also met the French composer Darius Milhaud, who was in Rio as secretary to Paul Claudel at the French Legation. Milhaud brought the music of Claude Debussy, Erik Satie, and possibly Igor Stravinsky; in return Villa-Lobos introduced Milhaud to Brazilian street music. In 1918, he also met the pianist Arthur Rubinstein, who became a lifelong friend and champion; this meeting prompted Villa-Lobos to write more piano music.

In about 1918 Villa-Lobos abandoned the use of opus numbers for his compositions as a constraint to his pioneering spirit. With the piano suite Carnaval das crianças (Children's carnival) of 1919–20, Villa-Lobos liberated his style altogether from European Romanticism: the suite, in eight movements with the finale written for piano duet, depicts eight characters or scenes from Rio's Lenten Carnival.

Trio for Oboe, Clarinet and Bassoon (1921)
1. Anime

2. Languissament

3. Vif
Performed by Rebecca Henderson (oboe), William McColl (clarinet) and Arthur Grossman (bassoon)

In February 1922, a festival of modern art took place in São Paulo and Villa-Lobos contributed performances of his own works. The press were unsympathetic and the audience were not appreciative; their mockery was encouraged by Villa-Lobos's being forced by a foot infection to wear one carpet slipper. The festival ended with Villa-Lobos's Quarteto simbólico, composed as an impression of Brazilian urban life.

In July 1922, Rubinstein gave the first performance of the piano suite A Prole do Bebê (The Baby's Family), composed in 1918. There had recently been an attempted military coup on Copacabana Beach, and places of entertainment had been closed for days; the public possibly wanted something less intellectually demanding, and the piece was booed. Villa-Lobos was philosophical about it, and Rubinstein later reminisced that the composer said, "I am still too good for them." The piece has been called "the first enduring work of Brazilian modernism".

Rubinstein suggested that Villa-Lobos tour abroad, and in 1923 he set out for Paris. His avowed aim was to exhibit his exotic sound world rather than to study. Just before he left he completed his Nonet (for ten players and chorus) which was first performed after his arrival in the French capital. He stayed in Paris in 1923–24 and 1927–30, and there he met influential residents including Edgard Varèse, Pablo Picasso, Leopold Stokowski and Aaron Copland. Parisian concerts of his music made a strong impression. (Note: See, for example, the influence of the brilliance of his orchestral palette on the young Olivier Messiaen, discussed in Griffiths 1985, 24.)

In the 1920s, Villa-Lobos would cross paths with one of the most well-known and influential classical guitar performers in history, Andrés Segovia, to work on a commissioned guitar composition. Villa-Lobos responded by writing a set of twelve such pieces, each based on a tiny detail or figure played by Brazilian itinerant street musicians (chorões), transformed into an étude that is not merely didactic. Over time, this collection of etudes has gone on to become one of the integral sets in the modern classical guitar repertoire, seen as higher level studies guitarists will have to play at some point or another during their careers. The music of chorões also provided the initial inspiration for his Chôros, a series of compositions written between 1920 and 1929. The first European performance of Chôros No. 10, in Paris, caused a storm: L. Chevaillier wrote of it in Le Monde musical, "[it is] an art ... to which we must now give a new name." Though he is not as well known for his guitar compositions, everything he wrote for the instrument is considered standard repertoire and is regarded as of utmost importance.

=== Vargas era ===
In 1930, Villa-Lobos, who was in Brazil to conduct, planned to return to Paris. One of the consequences of the revolution of that year was that money could no longer be taken out of the country, and so he had no means of paying any rents abroad. Thus forced to stay in Brazil, he arranged concerts instead around São Paulo, and composed patriotic and educational music. In 1932, he became director of the Superintendência de Educação Musical e Artística (SEMA), and his duties included arranging concerts including the Brazilian premieres of Ludwig van Beethoven's Missa Solemnis and Johann Sebastian Bach's Mass in B minor as well as Brazilian compositions. His position at SEMA led him to compose mainly patriotic and propagandist works. His series of Bachianas Brasileiras were a notable exception.

In 1936, at the age of forty-nine, Villa-Lobos left his wife, and became romantically involved with Arminda Neves d'Almeida, who remained his companion until death. Arminda eventually took on the name Villa-Lobos, though Villa-Lobos never divorced his first wife. After Villa-Lobos' death, Arminda became the Director of the Museu Villa-Lobos in 1960, until her death in 1985. Arminda was herself a musician and a significant influence on Villa-Lobos. He also dedicated a good number of works to her, including the Ciclo brasileiro and many of the Chôros.

Villa-Lobos's writings during the presidency of Getúlio Vargas (1930–1945) include propaganda for Brazilian nationhood (brasilidade), and teaching and theoretical works. His Guia Prático ran to 11 volumes, Solfejos (two volumes, 1942 and 1946) contained vocal exercises, and Canto Orfeônico (1940 and 1950) contained patriotic songs for schools and for civic occasions. His music for the film O Descobrimento do Brasil (The Discovery of Brazil) of 1936, which included versions of earlier compositions, was arranged into orchestral suites, and includes a depiction of the first mass in Brazil in a setting for double choir.

Villa-Lobos published A Música Nacionalista no Govêrno Getúlio Vargas c.1941, in which he characterised the nation as a sacred entity whose symbols (including its flag, motto and national anthem) were inviolable. Villa-Lobos was the chair of a committee whose task was to define a definitive version of the Brazilian national anthem.

After 1937, during the Estado Novo period when Vargas seized power by decree, Villa-Lobos continued producing patriotic works directly accessible to mass audiences. Independence Day on September 7, 1939, involved 30,000 children singing the national anthem and items arranged by Villa-Lobos. For the 1943 celebrations he also composed the ballet Dança da terra, which the authorities deemed unsuitable until it was revised. The 1943 celebrations did include Villa-Lobos's hymn Invocação em defesa da pátria shortly after Brazil's declaring war on Germany and its allies.

Villa-Lobos's status damaged his reputation among certain schools of musicians, among them disciples of new European trends such as serialism‍—‌which was effectively off limits in Brazil until the 1960s. This crisis was, in part, due to some Brazilian composers finding it necessary to reconcile Villa-Lobos's own liberation of Brazilian music from European models in the 1920s with a style of music they felt to be more universal.

=== Composer in demand ===
Villa-Lobos at the end of a concert in Tel Aviv, 1952

Vargas fell from power in 1945. Villa-Lobos was able, after the end of the war, to travel abroad again; he returned to Paris, and also made regular visits to the United States as well as travelling to Great Britain, and Israel. He received a huge number of commissions, and fulfilled many of them despite failing health. He recommended American pianist, musicologist, educator, and composer Jeanne Behrend for sponsorship, and under this sponsorship she toured giving lectures and concerts in South America from 1945-46. He composed concertos for piano, cello (the second one in 1953), classical guitar (in 1951 for Segovia, who refused to play it until the composer provided a cadenza in 1956), harp (for Nicanor Zabaleta in 1953) and harmonica (for John Sebastian, Sr. in 1955–56). Other commissions included his Symphony No. 11 (for the Boston Symphony Orchestra in 1955), and the opera Yerma (1955–56) based on the play by Federico García Lorca. His prolific output of this period prompted criticisms of note-spinning and banality: critical reactions to his Piano Concerto No. 5 included the comments "bankrupt" and "piano tuners' orgy", "raked the very depths of banality", "nothing ... but soupy textures or a bedraggled romantic idea", and "truly the kind of music that should never get written, still less performed".

His music for the film Green Mansions starring Audrey Hepburn and Anthony Perkins, commissioned by MGM in 1958, earned Villa-Lobos US$25,000, and he conducted the soundtrack recording himself. The film was in production for many years. Originally to be directed by Vincente Minnelli, it was taken over by Hepburn's husband Mel Ferrer. MGM decided to use only part of Villa-Lobos's music in the actual film, turning instead to Bronisław Kaper for the rest of the music. From the score, Villa-Lobos compiled a work for soprano soloist, male chorus, and orchestra, which he titled Forest of the Amazon and recorded in 1959 in stereo with Brazilian soprano Bidu Sayão, an unidentified male chorus, and the Symphony of the Air for United Artists Records. The recording was issued both on LP and reel-to-reel tape (United Artist UAC 8007, stereo 7 1/2 IPS).

In June 1959, Villa-Lobos alienated many of his fellow musicians by expressing disillusionment, saying in an interview that Brazil was "dominated by mediocrity". In November he died in Rio; his state funeral was the final major civic event in that city before the capital transferred to Brasília. He is buried in the Cemitério São João Batista in Rio de Janeiro.

== Music ==
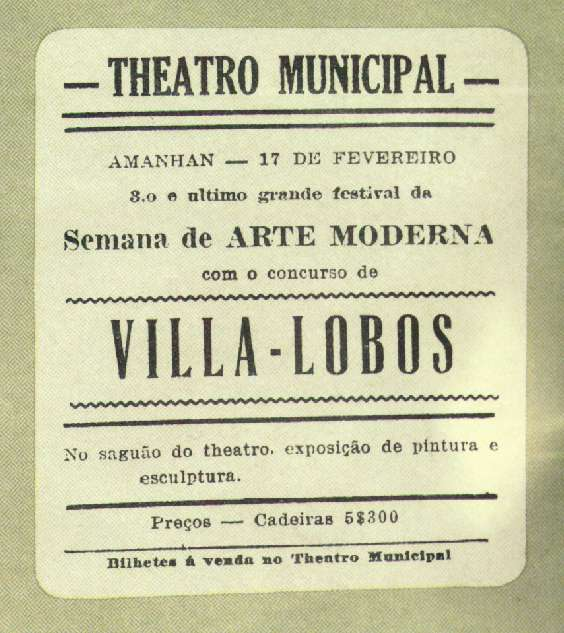
Poster announcing appearance of Villa-Lobos in São Paulo (February 17, 1922)

His earliest pieces originated in guitar improvisations, for example Panqueca (Pancake) of 1900. The concert series of 1915–21 included first performances of pieces demonstrating originality and virtuosic technique. Some of these pieces are early examples of elements of importance throughout his œuvre. His attachment to the Iberian Peninsula is demonstrated in Canção Ibéria of 1914 and in orchestral transcriptions of some of Enrique Granados' piano Goyescas (1918, now lost). Other themes that were to recur in his later work include the anguish and despair of the piece Desesperança – Sonata Phantastica e Capricciosa no. 1 (1915), a violin sonata including "histrionic and violently contrasting emotions", the birds of L'oiseau blessé d'une flèche (1913), the mother–child relationship (not usually a happy one in Villa-Lobos's music) in Les mères of 1914, and the flowers of Suíte floral for piano of 1916–18 which reappeared in Distribuição de flores for flute and classical guitar of 1937.

Reconciling European tradition and Brazilian influences was also an element that bore fruit more formally later. His earliest published work Pequena suíte for cello and piano of 1913 shows a love for the cello, but is not notably Brazilian, although it contains elements that were to resurface later. His three-movement Suíte graciosa of 1915 (expanded to six movements c. 1947 to become his String Quartet No. 1) is influenced by European opera, while Três danças características (africanas e indígenas) of 1914–16 for piano, later arranged for octet and subsequently orchestrated, is radically influenced by the tribal music of the Caripunas Indians of Mato Grosso.

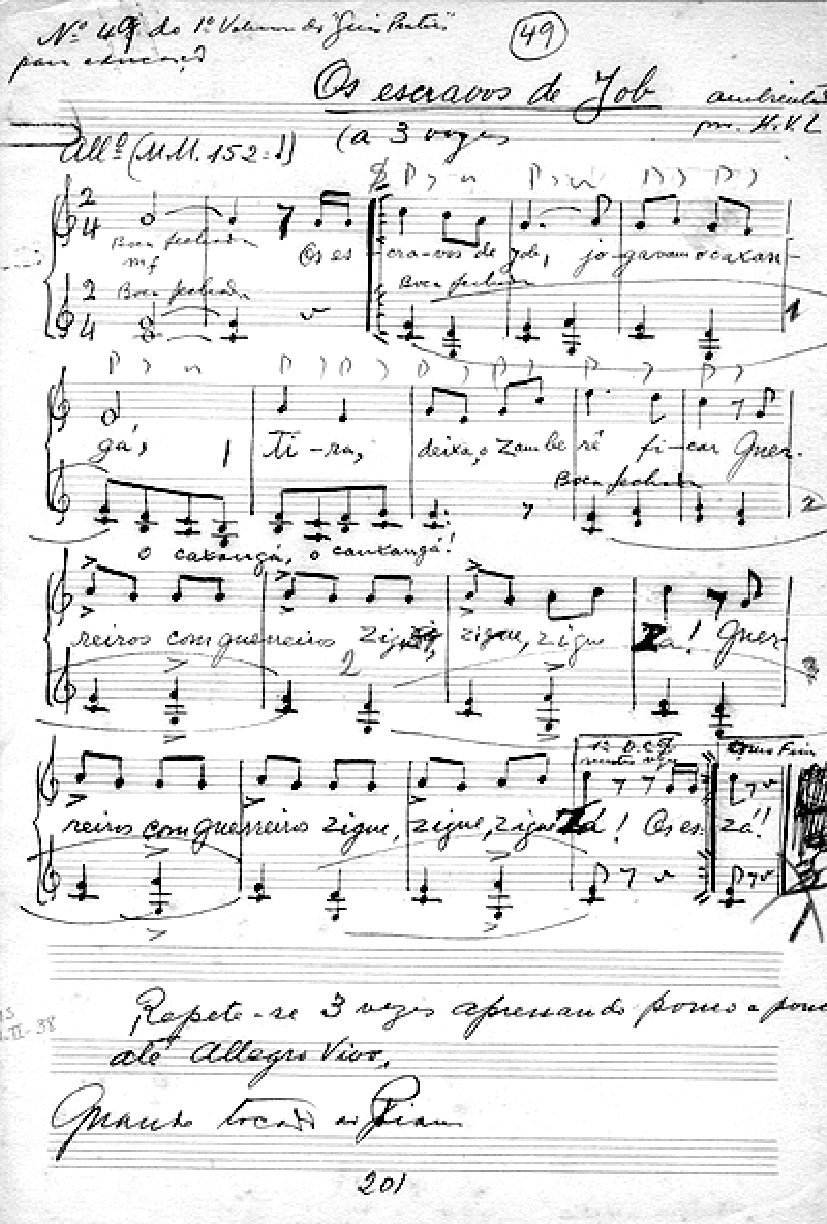
Facsimile of Villa-Lobos's "Escravos de Jó" (Slaves of Job)

With his tone poems Amazonas (1917, first performed in Paris in 1929) and Uirapurú (1917, first performed 1935) he created works dominated by indigenous Brazilian influences. The works use Brazilian folk tales and characters, imitations of the sounds of the jungle and its fauna, imitations of the sound of the nose-flute by the violinophone, and not least imitations of the uirapuru bird itself.

His meeting with Arthur Rubinstein in 1918 prompted Villa-Lobos to compose piano music such as Simples coletânea of 1919—which was possibly influenced by Rubinstein's playing of Ravel and Scriabin on his South American tours—and Bailado infernal of 1920. The latter piece includes the tempi and expression markings "vertiginoso e frenético", "infernal" and "mais vivo ainda" (faster still).

Carnaval das crianças of 1919–20 saw Villa-Lobos's mature style emerge; unconstrained by the use of traditional formulae or any requirement for dramatic tension, the piece at times imitates a mouth organ, children's dances, a harlequinade, and ends with an impression of the carnival parade. This work was orchestrated in 1929 with new linking passages and a new title, Momoprecoce. Naïveté and innocence is also heard in the piano suites A Prole do Bebê (The Baby's Family) of 1918–21.

Around this time he also fused urban Brazilian influences and impressions, for example in his Quarteto simbólico of 1921. He included the urban street music of the chorões, who were groups containing flute, clarinet and cavaquinho (a Brazilian guitar), and often also including ophicleide, trombones or percussion. Villa-Lobos occasionally joined such bands. Early works showing this influence were incorporated into the Suite populaire brésilienne of 1908–12 assembled by his publisher, and more mature works include the Sexteto místico (c.1955, replacing a lost and probably unfinished one begun in 1917), and his setting of the poetry of Mário de Andrade and Catulo da Paxão Cearense in the Canções típicas brasileiras of 1919. His classical guitar studies are also influenced by the music of the chorões.

The 12 etudes for guitar commissioned by Andre Segovia during the 1920's serve as a testament to Villa-Lobos’s ability to create and compose meaningful music across a multitude of different instruments. Each piece focuses on the development of different core guitar skills while simultaneously representing the different sounds and techniques found amongst Brazilian street performers, blending both his own nationalistic composition style with a more technical, study first` approach. This is well-demonstrated in the first etude of his collection, presenting an almost exclusively arpeggiated piece with a unique right-hand pattern.

All the elements mentioned so far are fused in Villa-Lobos's Nonet. Subtitled Impressão rápida do todo o Brasil (A Brief Impression of the Whole of Brazil), the title of the work denotes it as ostensibly chamber music, but it is scored for flute/piccolo, oboe, clarinet, saxophone, bassoon, celesta, harp, piano, a large percussion battery requiring at least two players, and a mixed chorus.

In Paris, his musical vocabulary established, Villa-Lobos solved the problem of his works' form. It was perceived as an incongruity that his Brazilian impressionism should be expressed in the form of quartets and sonatas. He developed new forms to free his imagination from the constraints of conventional musical development such as that required in sonata form. The multi-sectional poema form may be seen in the Suite for Voice and Violin, which is somewhat like a triptych, and the Poema da criança e sua mamã for voice, flute, clarinet, and cello (1923). The extended Rudepoêma for piano, written for Rubinstein, is a multi-layered work, often requiring notation on several staves, and is both experimental and demanding. Wright calls it "the most impressive result" of this formal development. The Ciranda, or Cirandinha is a stylised treatment of simple Brazilian folk melodies in a wide variety of moods. A ciranda is a child's singing game, but Villa-Lobos's treatment in the works he gave this title are sophisticated. Another form was the Chôros. Villa-Lobos composed more than a dozen works with this title for various instruments, mostly in the years 1924–1929. He described them as "a new form of musical composition", a transformation of the Brazilian music and sounds "by the personality of the composer".

He also composed between 1930 and 1945 nine pieces he called Bachianas Brasileiras (Brazilian Bachian pieces). These take the forms and nationalism of the Chôros, and add the composer's love of Bach. He incorporated neoclassicism in his nationalistic style. Villa-Lobos's use of archaisms was not new (an early example is his Pequena suíte for cello and piano of 1913). The pieces evolved over the period rather than being conceived as a whole, some of them being revised or added to. They contain some of his most popular music, such as No. 5 for soprano and eight cellos (1938–1945), and No. 2 for orchestra of 1930 (the Tocata movement of which is O trenzinho do caipira, "The little train of the Caipira"). They also show the composer's love for the tonal qualities of the cello, both No. 1 and No. 5 being scored for no other instruments. In these works, the often harsh dissonances of his earlier music are less evident: or, as Simon Wright puts it, they are "sweetened". The transformation of Chôros into Bachianas Brasileiras is demonstrated clearly by the comparison of No. 6 for flute and bassoon with the earlier Chôros No. 2 for flute and clarinet. The dissonances of the later piece are more controlled, the forward direction of the music easier to discern. Bachianas Brasileiras No. 9 takes the concept so far as to be an abstract Prelude and Fugue, a complete distillation of the composer's national influences. Villa-Lobos eventually recorded all nine of these works for EMI in Paris, mostly with the musicians of the French National Orchestra; these were originally issued on LPs and later reissued on CDs. He also recorded the first section of Bachianas Brasileiras No. 5 with Bidu Sayão and a group of cellists for Columbia.

During his period at SEMA, Villa-Lobos composed five string quartets, nos. 5 to 9, which explored avenues opened by his public music that dominated his output. He also wrote more music for Segovia, the Cinq préludes, which also demonstrate a further formalisation of his composition style. After the fall of the Vargas government, Villa-Lobos returned full-time to composition, resuming a prolific rate of completing works. His concertos—particularly those for the classical guitar, the harp, and the harmonica—are examples of his earlier poema form. The Harp Concerto is a large work, and shows a new propensity to focus on a small detail, then to fade it and bring another detail to the foreground. This technique also occurs in his final opera, Yerma, which contains a series of scenes each of which establishes an atmosphere, similarly to the earlier Momoprecoce.

Villa-Lobos's final major work was the music for the film Green Mansions (though in the end, most of his score was replaced with music by Bronisław Kaper) and its arrangement as Floresta do Amazonas for orchestra, as well as some short songs issued separately. In 1957, he wrote a Seventeenth String Quartet, whose austerity of technique and emotional intensity "provide a eulogy to his craft". His Bendita Sabedoria, a sequence of a cappella chorales written in 1958, is a similarly simple setting of Latin biblical texts. These works lack the pictorialism of his more public music.

Except for the lost works, the Nonet, the two concerted works for violin and orchestra, Suite for Piano and Orchestra, a number of the symphonic poems, most of his choral music and all of the operas, his music is well represented on the world's recital and concert stages and on compact disc.

== Homages ==
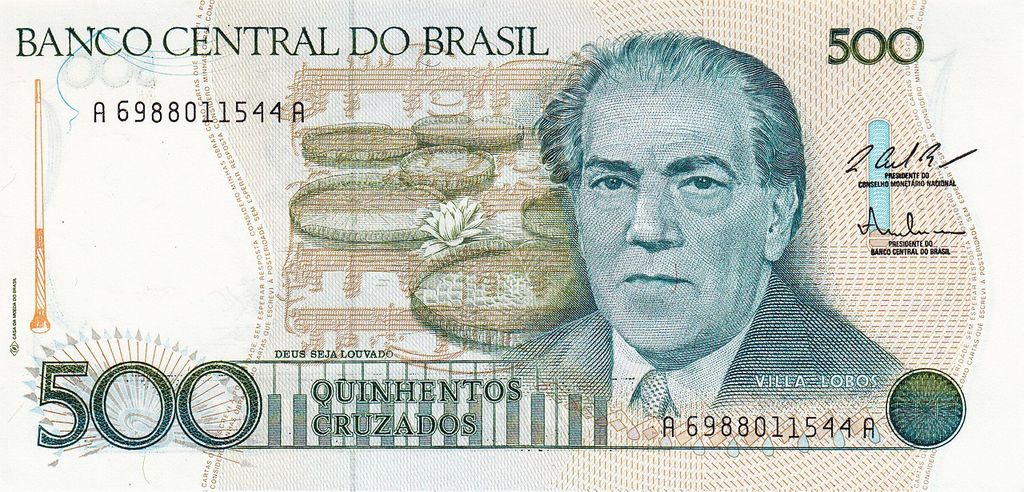
Villa-Lobos on a 1987 500 Brazilian cruzados banknote

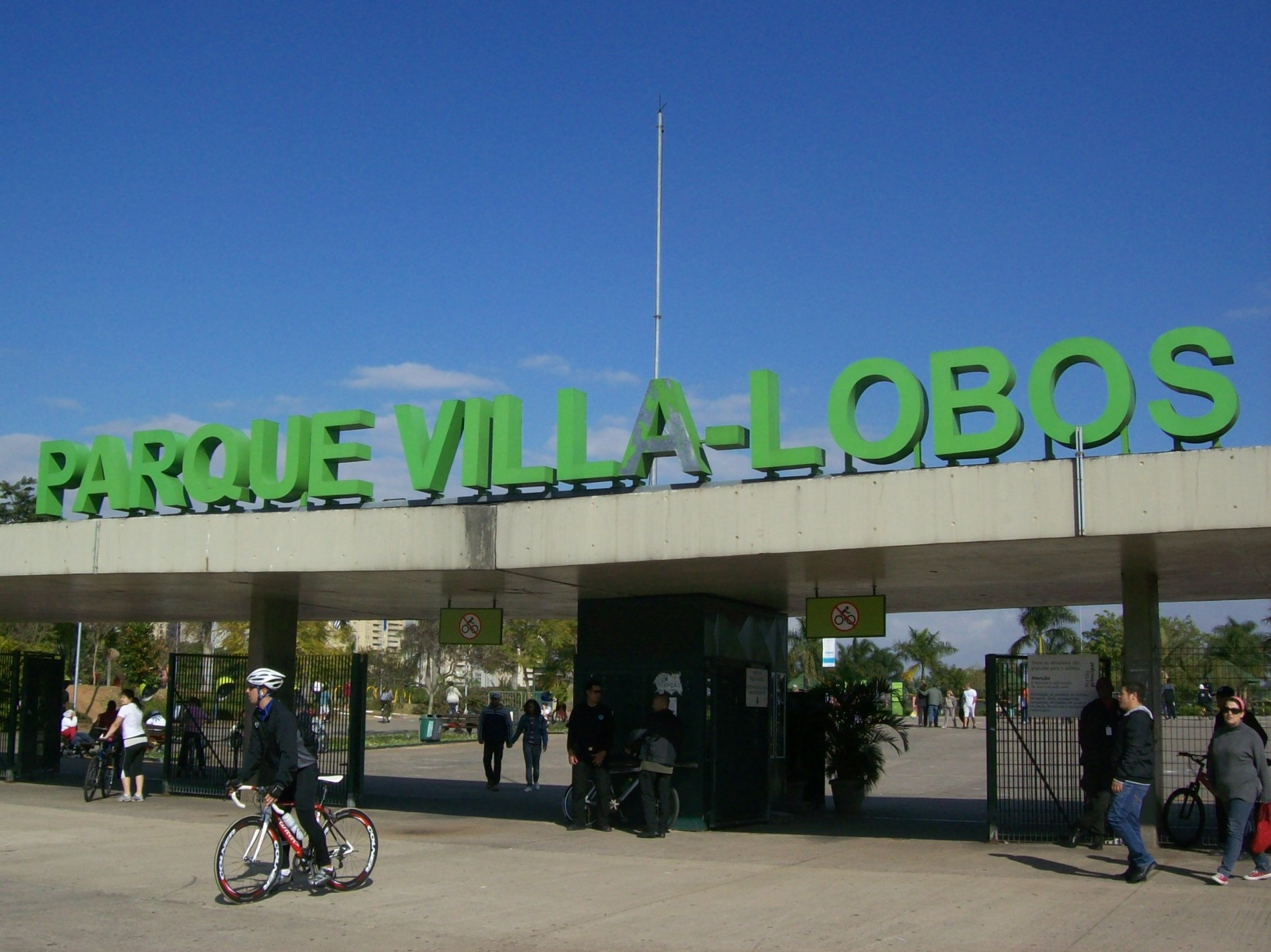
The Villa-Lobos State Park in São Paulo, Brazil, created in 1989

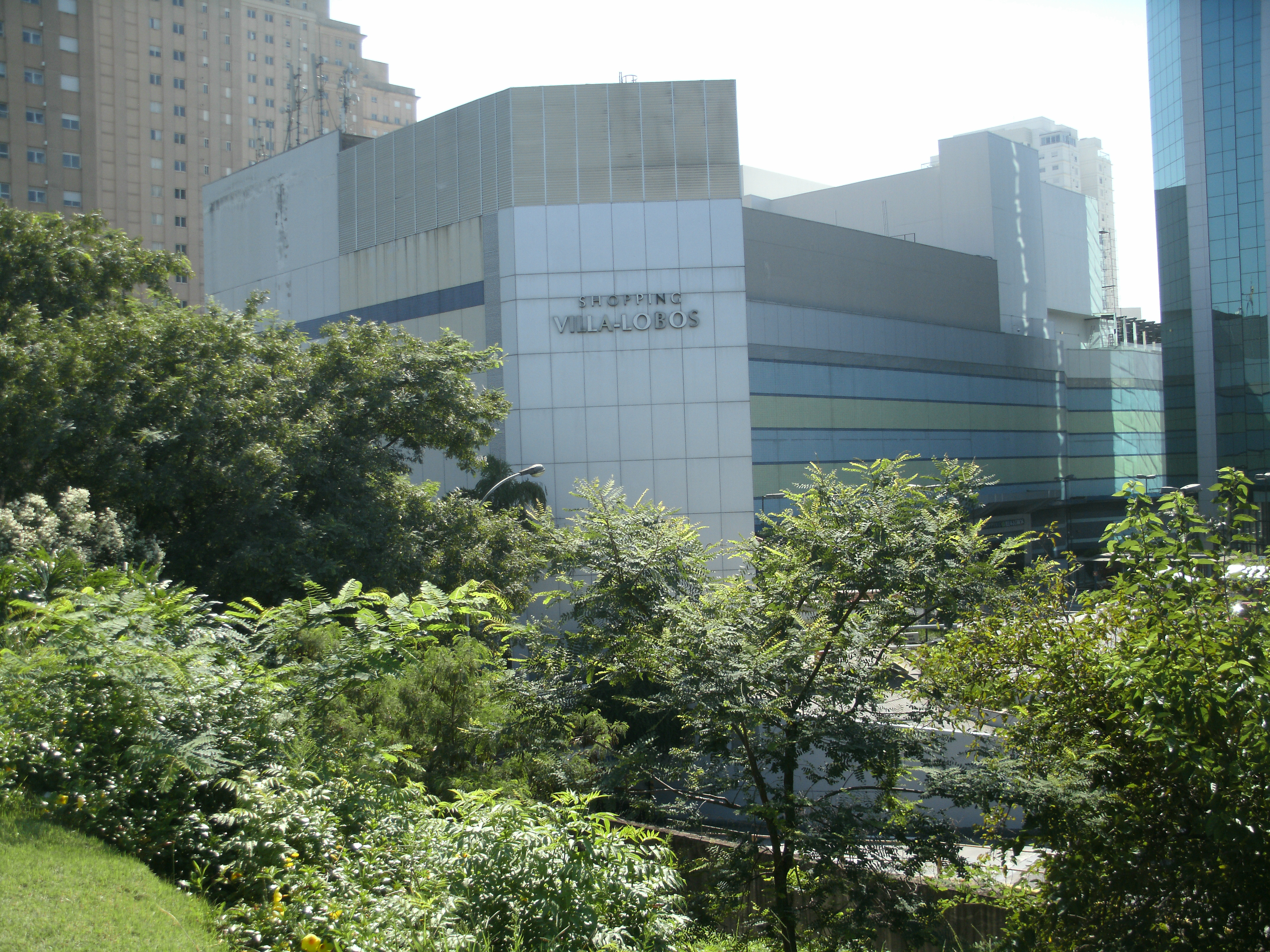
The Shopping Villa Lobos, a shopping mall in São Paulo, Brazil, created in 2000

== Recordings ==
- Villa-Lobos plays Villa-Lobos (SCSH 010, SanCtuS Recordings) (audio)
- Villa-Lobos par lui-même (EMI Classics 0077776722924) (archive from September 26, 2011, accessed November 19, 2015).
- Villa-Lobos: Bachianas Brasileiras Nos. 1, 2, 5 & 9 Angel 0724356696426; EMI Classics CD 724356696457 (archive from September 26, 2011, accessed November 19, 2015). (EMI Classics)
- A database of available Villa-Lobos recordings (archive)

== Notes and references ==
Notes

=== Sources ===
- Anon. 2016. "Canções típicas brasileiras = Chansons typiques brésiliennes". Indiana University website (accessed March 20, 2016).
- Béhague, Gerard. 2001. "Villa-Lobos, Heitor". The New Grove Dictionary of Music and Musicians, edited by Stanley Sadie and John Tyrrell. London: Macmillan.
- EMI catalogue.
- Griffiths, Paul. 1985. Olivier Messiaen and the Music of Time. London: Faber and Faber. ISBN 0-8014-1813-5.
- Guimarães, Luiz. 1972. Villa-Lobos visto da plateia e na intimidade (1912/1935). Rio de Janeiro: Grafica Editora Arte Moderna.
- Heitor Villa-Lobos website..
- Lopes, Luiz Fernando (July 25, 2022), "Villa-Lobos, Heitor", Oxford Music Online, Oxford University Press, ISBN 978-1-56159-263-0
- The MGM Story.
- Mitchell, Donald (July 1955). "London Music". The Musical Times. 96 (1349): 378–380. doi:10.2307/937305. JSTOR 937305.
- Negwer, Manuel. 2008. Villa-Lobos: Der Aufbruch der brasilianischen Musik. Mainz: Schott Music. ISBN 3-7957-0168-6.
- Negwer, Manuel. 2009. Villa Lobos e o florescimento da música brasileira. São Paulo: Martins Fontes. ISBN 978-85-61635-40-4. [Portuguese version of Negwer 2008.]
- Peppercorn, Lisa. 1972. "Villa-Lobos's Brazilian Excursions". The Musical Times 113, no. 1549 (March): 263–265.
- Peppercorn, Lisa M. 1991b. "Villa-Lobos 'ben trovato'". Tempo, no. 177 (June): 32–39.
- Sony Masterworks catalogue. 1972.
- Tarasti, Eero. 1995. Heitor Villa-Lobos: The Life and Works Jefferson, North Carolina: McFarland. ISBN 0-7864-0013-7.
- Villa-Lobos, Heitor. [1941?]. A música nacionalista no govêrno Getulio Vargas. Rio de Janeiro: D.I.P.
- Villa-Lobos, sua obra: Programa de Ação Cultural, second edition, 1972. Rio de Janeiro: MEC, DAC, Museu Villa-Lobos.
- Wright, Simon. 1992. Villa-Lobos. Oxford and New York: Oxford University Press. ISBN 0-19-315475-7.
- Yang, Shu-Ting. 2007. "Salute to Bach: Modern Treatments of Bach-Inspired Elements in Luigi Dallapiccola's Quaderno Musicale di Annalibera and Heitor Villa-Lobos' Bachianas Brasileiras No. 4". DMA diss. Cincinnati: University of Cincinnati. Retrieved November 25, 2017.
