= Francis Duroy =

French violinist (born 1959)

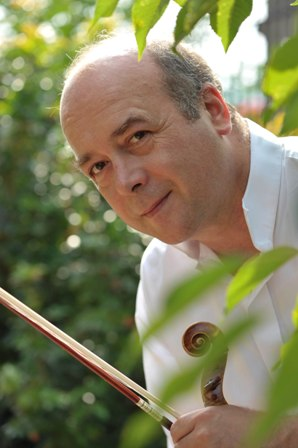
Violoniste Francis Duroy

Francis Duroy (born 12 September 1959) is a French classical violinist.

== File ==
Born in Charenton-le-Pont, Duroy began his musical studies at the age of eight at the conservatoire à rayonnement régional de Saint-Maur-des-Fossés where he was introduced to the violin, the piano, the French horn, writing and chamber music. He continued his studies of violin in Brussels with Maurice Raskin, then at the Conservatoire national supérieur musique et danse de Lyon, with Véda Reynolds.

In 1985, Duroy received a scholarship to study at the Banff Centre School of Fines Arts (Canada). He perfected his skills with great masters such as violinists Zoltán Székely and Ivry Gitlis, violist Raphael Hillyer, cellist Anner Bylsma and pianist Menahem Pressler.

In 1986, Duroy was appointed soloist of the Opéra national de Lyon under the direction of John Eliot Gardiner and Kent Nagano. From 1989 to 1991, he was concertmaster of the Orchestre national de Lyon, Emmanuel Krivine conducting.

Since 1992, Duroy had a career as a concert performer that took him to all continents.

In 2005, he made an important tour that took him to the biggest venues in Japan and opened the doors to Asia. He also performed in Korea.

In 2010, Duroy was invited to perform in a recital on the prestigious stage of New York's Carnegie Hall. In 2012, at the invitation of the Czech Philharmonic Orchestra, he gave a recital at the Rudolfinum in Prague.

Invited to numerous festivals and prestigious venues, he has performed in Japan at the Kioi Hall in Tokyo the, Shirakawa Hall in Nagoya, NHK Hall in Osaka, the Kyoto Center Hall, in Korea at the Poyang City Hall and Pusan University, USA at the Carnegie Hall in (New York), the Musical Bridges around the World San Antonio Festival (Texas), the Black Man Hall in Boston, Norway, the Grieg im Bergen Festival, Slovenia, the Lubjana Festival, Italy, the Serate Musicali Festival in Brescia, the Musica in Irpinia Festival in Naples, the Catania Festival in Taranto as well as in France in many prestigious festivals and venues: Théâtre des Champs-Élysées in Paris, "Saoû chante Mozart", "Promenades Musicales de la Côte d'Azur", Festival de musique de chambre de Paris, Festival de Tournon, Musicalta in Rouffach, Festival of Montpellier, Nancyphonies... alongside musicians such as Maurice André, Philippe Bernold, Patrice Fontanarosa, Roland Pidoux, Michel Bourdoncle, Kirill Rodin...

Duroy is regularly invited to play as a soloist with many orchestras around the world: Dnipro Philharmonic Orchestra and Kyiv Philharmonic Orchestra (Ukraine), Pohang Symphony Orchestra (Korea), San Luis Potosi Symphony Orchestra and Aguascalientes Symphony Orchestra (Mexico), Ribeiro Preto Symphony Orchestra (Brazil), Ico Magna Grecia Orchestra (Italy), Baden Bade Philharmonic Orchestra, Romanian State Orchestra, Opéra National de Lyon, Orchestre Lyrique Région Avignon Provence, Ensemble Instrumental de Grenoble, Orchestre de chambre Bernard Thomas, La Camerata de France and Orchestre de chambre les Archets de Paris, of which he was concertmaster from 1993 to 1995.

Duroy's repertoire ranges from the Baroque period to the music of today. He has collaborated with many composers including Michaël Lévinas, Philippe Leroux, Wolfgang Motz and Nicolas Vérin who dedicated his work Chassés croisés II for violin and piano to him.

In addition to his concert activity, Duroy has an important pedagogical activity: he is currently a professor at the Conservatoire à rayonnement régional de Lyon. He is also invited to give master classes in Asia (Japan and Korea) and Europe and is a jury member in numerous international competitions. Duroy was the founder - and artistic director of Musicalta since its establishment in 1993.
