= Leleu =

Leleu is a French surname. Notable people with the surname include:

- Gérard Leleu (1932–2024), French doctor and sexologist
- Guy Leleu (1950–2026), French racing cyclist
- Jean-François Leleu (1729–1807), French furniture-maker
- Jeanne Leleu (1898–1979), French composer
- John Leleu (born 1935), Welsh international rugby union player
- Jules Leleu (1883–1961), French furniture designer
- Philippe Leleu (born 1958), French cyclist
- René Leleu (1911–1984), French sculptor
- Romain Leleu (born 1983), French trumpeter
- Thomas Leleu (born 1987), French tuba player

== See also ==
- Lelêu, Brazilian footballer
