= Dana Ciocarlie =

French pianist (born 1968)

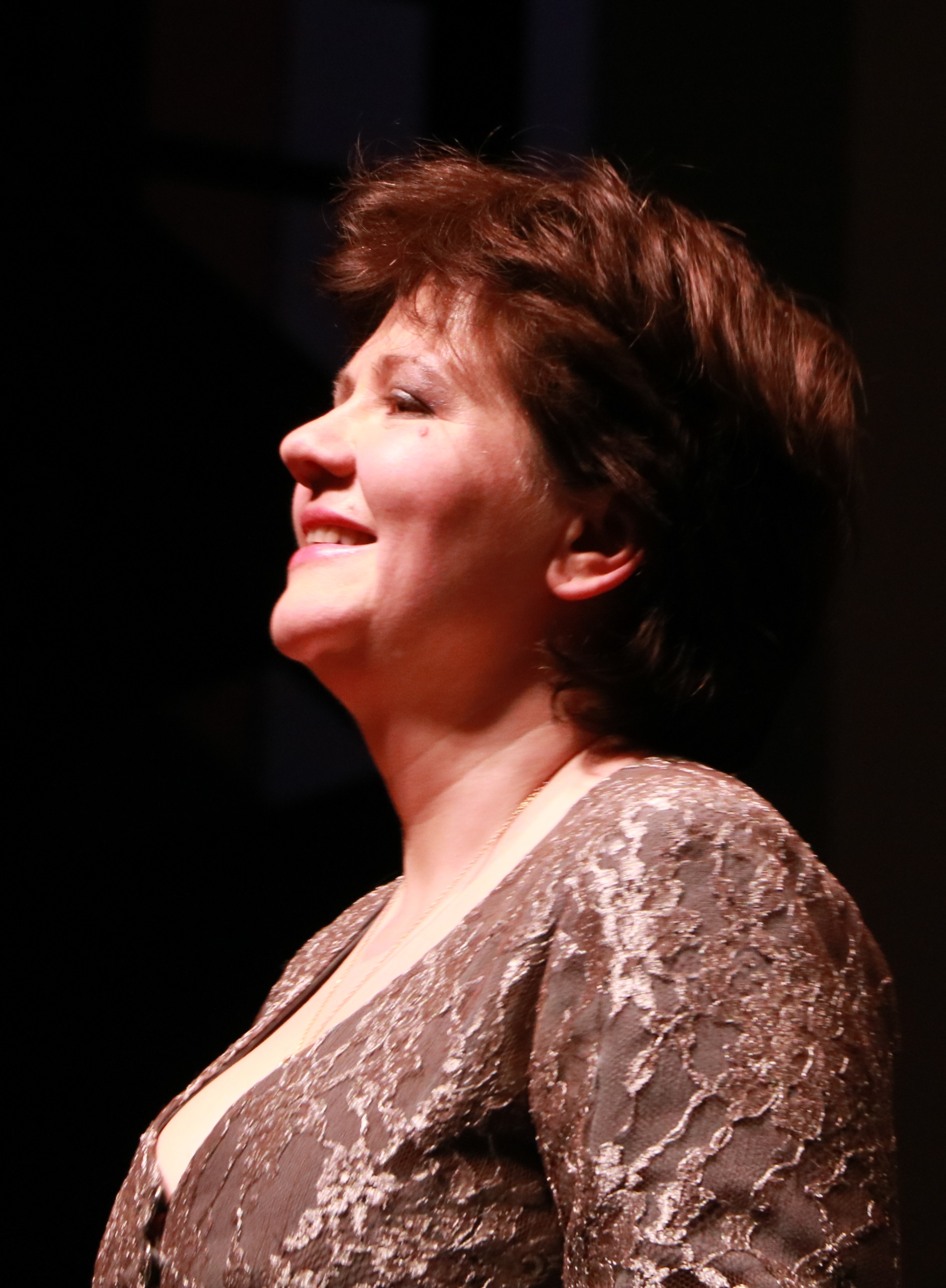
Dana Ciocarlie at La Folle Journée 2018 in Nantes

Dana Ciocarlie (born 26 November 1968) is a French pianist and teacher of music of Romanian origin.

== Life ==
Born in Bucharest, Ciocarlie began her musical studies at the Bucharest Conservatory and won her first prize in 1990. She came to work at the École normale de musique de Paris with Viktoria Melki (a student of Alfred Cortot) for her concert diploma, then perfected her skills with Dominique Merlet and Georges Pludermacher for two years at the Conservatoire de Paris as well as with Christian Zacharias and Dmitri Bashkirov.

She then participated in various competitions: winner of the Yamaha Foundation (1993), the Cziffra Foundation (1994), auditions of young artists in Leipzig (1995), and won the Pro Musicis prize in 1996 (prize of the Yvonne Lefébure foundation), the same year than the Robert Schumann International Competition for Pianists and Singers in Zwickau (2nd place) and the Géza Anda Competition the following year in Zurich (special Sándor Végh prize).

She has played with violinists Gilles Apap, Nicolas Dautricourt, Laurent Korcia, Irina Muresanu; pianists Christian Zacharias, Philippe Bianconi and Anne Queffélec; with violist Gérard Caussé and the Talich Quartet.

She has premiered numerous contemporary works dedicated to her by Édith Canat de Chizy, Karol Beffa, Nicolas Bacri, Stéphane Delplace, Dan Dediu, Jacques Lenot, Laurent Mettraux, Frédéric Verrières and Helena Winkelman.

Ciocarlie is a teacher at the Conservatoire national supérieur musique et danse de Lyon (chamber music) and the École normale de Paris.

== Discography ==
Piano solo

- Marie Jaëll, Symphonic and piano music : Les beaux jours (12 piano pieces, world premiere recording) - Dana Ciocarlie, piano (2015, 3CDs Ediciones Singulares/Palazzetto Bru Zane-Centre de musique romantique française) OCLC 946046686, ISBN 8460830179
- Schubert, Sonatas D.960, 3 Klavierstücke D.946 (July 1996, L'Empreinte digitale 13054) OCLC 693484336
- Schumann, Complete work for piano (La Dolce Volta)
- Romania: Paul Constantinescu, Enesco, Bartók (April 2000, L'Empreinte Digitale) OCLC 49014941
- La langue maternelle: Bartók (Musiques nocturnes, Mikrokosmos extr.), Eötvös (Kosmos), Ligeti (Musica ricercata) (2005, L'Empreinte digitale) OCLC 811644443, 743079088
- Debussy en miroirs: Claude Debussy, Frédéric Verrières (Paraphrase), Karol Beffa (3 Études), Franck Krawczyk (Toccata), Thierry Escaich (Les Litanies de l'ombre) (Triton)
- Piano à quatre mains : invitation à la danse: Edvard Grieg, Hans Huber, Helena Winkelman, Max Bruch - Christiane Baume-Sanglard, Dana Ciocarlie piano (4-7 January 2015, Claves) OCLC 952973721

Chamber music

- Rubinstein, Sonate pour violon, Sonate pour alto - Pierre Franck (violon et alto) (décembre 2003, Arion/Pierre Verany PV704051) OCLC 718725961, 659113832
- Magnard and Lekeu: Sonatas for violin - Irina Muresanu, violin (15-18 December 2005, Ar Ré-Sé AR 2006-0) OCLC 474215636
- Dvořák, Quintet with piano No 2 - Psophos Quartet (2007, Ar Ré-Sé) OCLC 154808990
- Mendelssohn, Works for cello and piano - Sébastien van Kuijk, cello (Intrada)
- Bohémia : Janáček, Suk, Martinů, Mařatka - Marianne Piketty, violin (Integral Classics)
- Franck and Fauré, Sonatas for violin - Amanda Favier; violin (promotional record "Le Violon de l’ADAMI")
