= Mathieu Laine =

French entrepreneur and intellectual (born 1975)

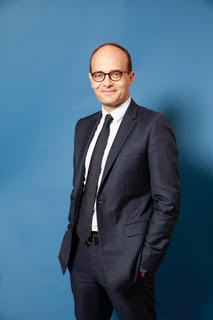
- Born: 9 April 1975 (age 51); Lille, France

Mathieu Laine (French pronunciation: [matjø lɛn]; born 9 April 1975) is a French entrepreneur and intellectual.

He is the founder and head of Altermind, a boutique consultancy firm based in Paris, London, Brussels and Berlin.

Laine is an affiliate professor at Sciences Po Paris. He is the author of many essays on liberalism and works as an editorialist for the French weekly political magazines Le Point and Le Figaro. He is a member of the team of the programme L'Esprit public on France Culture and author of a dozen essays and a musical tale. He chairs the Coppet Institute, a think-tank defending the French liberal heritage. He became a columnist Les Echos in September 2020.

== Life and career ==
Son and grandson of doctors, Mathieu Laine joined in the 1990s the Idées action (Ideas-Action) movement of Alain Madelin, Minister of Enterprises and Economic Development in 1993 and 1995, then Minister of Economy and Finance in 1995. He became head of Idées-Actions' Youth Department and, in this capacity, participated in Jacques Chirac's presidential campaign in 1995.

He holds a certificate in the legal profession, a DEA in business law from the University of Paris II Panthéon-Assas and graduated from Sciences Po in 2001 (major in finance).

Mathieu Laine taught business law at the University of Paris II Panthéon-Assas from 2001 to 2005, then from 2006, introduction to law in the team of Professor Marie-Anne Frison-Roche; in 2008, he created an Introduction to Liberal Thinking seminar at Sciences Po.

In 2018, he was appointed Affiliate Professor of Political Humanities at Sciences Po. In this capacity, he created a course entitled "Thinking Freedom in the 21st Century". The lecture he gives in 2019 aims to answer the question "Can we save the free world?". In 2020, he offers students the course "Literature and Freedom".

=== Career ===
Mathieu Laine was a corporate lawyer from 2001 to 2007. He then worked at Bredin Prat, before joining Brandford-Griffith6. In April 2005, after serving as deputy director of the Turgot Institute, he joined the Board of Directors of the Association for Economic Freedom and Social Progress (ALEPS).

Mathieu Laine created Altermind in 2007. It is a boutique consultancy whose integrated global team of business advisors and academic experts provides business leaders with tailored advice. Altermind's methodology provides companies with a tool to help them succeed in today's complex and fast-changing business environment.

Mathieu Laine became an advisor to the Foundation for Political Innovation in 2009. He leads the reflection on the subject of growth10.

In 2014, Mathieu Laine moved to London and created Altermind's British office, Altermind UK, now headed by Arabella Phillimore.

Since the launch of Altermind, Mathieu Laine has advised several executives of major companies, including Carrefour, Vivendi, Suez, Orange, Crédit Agricole, Danone, Facebook, Airbnb, Prada, AXA, Total, L'Oréal, Nestlé, and the Principality of Monaco.

He advises several executives such as Alexandre Bompard, Vincent Bolloré, Stéphane Richard, Yannick Bolloré, Philippe Knoche, and Augustin de Romanet.

According to an article in Les Echos, Mathieu Laine proposes with his firm Altermind an innovative model of strategic consulting, by constituting "an ad hoc team for each mission, generally commissioned at the highest level of the company", "by bringing together consultants with academics likely to provide original solutions based on their latest research"; his firm has a network of 300 academics, supplied via "a database developed with in-house AI tools which enables the academic world to be scanned in order to approach new profiles".

Among Altermind's achievements, "to have had the merger between FNAC and Darty accepted by succeeding in including online sales in the reference market considered by the Competition Authority" - the newspaper Les Echos specifies: "professors from Dauphine, HEC, Berkeley and MIT were solicited" - as well as behavioural economics skills and the elaboration of an opinion survey thanks to the participation of more than 22,000 respondents".

Another mission relayed in the media, on behalf of the BPCE bank, was the development of an algorithmic and data strategy "to put it at the service of its advisers rather than using it to replace them" and a mission on the "future of work". Laurent Mignon, chairman of the management board of the French bank, testifies: "Altermind puts people you are not used to seeing in front of you and offers you an astonishing depth of reflection".

Altermind's partners include Aurélie Jean (in charge of Algorithms and Data), Erwan Le Noan (in charge of Regulations and Antitrust), Benoit Tirion (in charge of Regulations, Infrastructure and Transport), Florian Ingen-Ousz (in charge of Strategy and M&A); Altermind announces the arrival of Anne Dufermont, who has had a career at L'Oréal and Chanel in particular, at the beginning of 2020, to open and manage its Brussels office.

In July 2020, Altermind announces the arrival of former British Chancellor of the Exchequer George Osborne. He will chair an Advisory Committee responsible for providing the firm with ideas and representing it to help it export its approach abroad. George Osborne said: "the model is interesting: the university and the boards are two worlds too far apart".

== Political and intellectual views ==
Mathieu Laine has been a regular contributor to the media scene for almost twenty years. In the past, he has written in several major media, including Les Echos, Le Monde, L'Express, with appearances as a weekly columnist for Le Figaro-Magazine (weekly column Vrai Faux? which becameC'est pourtant vrai! between 2007 and 2010), in L'Opinion the year it was launched, and in Challenges during the 2017 presidential campaign. Today, he is a columnist for Le Figaro and Le Point, and will return to Les Echos as Essais columnist in September 2020.

In April 2005, after having been deputy director of the Turgot Institute, he joined the board of directors of the Association for Economic Freedom and Social Progress (ALEPS) in 2014. Between 2009 and 2011, he becomes an advisor to the Foundation for Political Innovation. Mathieu Laine is a member of the editorial board of the journal Commentaire, of the Mont Pèlerin Society (MPS), an international society of liberal intellectuals founded by Friedrich Hayek in 1947, and of Le Siècle.

=== Political views ===
In 2002, Laine published an open letter to the then French Prime Minister Jean-Pierre Raffarin about his "cent jours" as head of the cabinet.

Mathieu Laine is in the same class at Sciences-Po (1999–2001) as President Emmanuel Macron. The two men will meet again in 2008, when one had just joined the Rothschild & Co and the other had just launched Altermind. Laine was one of the first to encourage Emmanuel Macron to run for the French presidency. In December 2015, a year before his candidacy, he publicly invited him to do it in an article published in Le Point.

In April 2016, he agreed to advise two presidential candidates, Emmanuel Macron and François Fillon, with the agreement of both men and the idea that for the first time there would be two Liberal presidential candidates, one a Progressive Liberal, the other a Liberal-Conservative. He even put forward the idea of a Macron-Fillon alliance, but following the revelations about Fillon, he made a decision in April 2017 by expressing his support for candidate Macron in an article entitled "Why I vote Macron after voting Fillon in the Primary".

In April 2017, he publicly supported Emmanuel Macron for the first round of the presidential election.

He is an active advisor of Emmanuel Macron since his election. He convinced him during the summer 2017 to implement tax reforms in 2018 and not 2019, contrarily to the Prime Minister's 2017 Policy Address. Beyond his role as advisor, he is considered a friend of the President of the Republic with full freedom of speech, which has earned him the enmity of some people around the executive.

=== Intellectual views ===
Mathieu Laine places individual freedom at the heart of his intellectual work. He denounces excessive interventionism and contemporary socialism, which he identifies as much on the right as on the left, and presents "the power and primacy of freedom" as the salutary path for France.

Individual freedoms are the very core of Laine's thought. He criticised government interventionism as well as modern socialism, which are, according to him, common to both the left and right wings. He asserts that only ‘the power and the primacy of freedom’ can be salutary for France.

In his first essay, La Grande nurserie (The Great Nursery) in 2006, he argues that the actions of the "Etat Nounou" (the nursing state) are breaking ‘the individual energies, the growth and the sense of responsibility’ by implementing preventive and prohibitive regulations. He considers those regulations to be freedom destroying and demonstrates their inefficiency due to their ‘suffocating’ effects on individuals. He proposes an alternate liberal approach based on individual responsibility and on lesser governmental activities.

In the Dictionnaire amoureux de la liberté (A Lover’s Dictionary of Liberty) published in 2013, Mathieu Laine defines freedom as "that deep, individual, cementing feeling of our dignity, the best chance for each person to hope to be and become what he or she is made for. Freedom is the very condition of humanity, happiness and self-esteem ".

In La France Adolescente (Adolescent France), he and psychiatrist Patrice Huerre paint a portrait of a complex country that aspires to greater freedom to give way to its thirst for creativity. According to the two authors, the suffocating social policy, the nanny-state, surveillance, characterises this impotent state, which nevertheless wants to be omnipresent in the lives of individuals.

In Transforming France - A Thousand Years of French Evil, he and Jean-Philippe Feldman retrace the historical problems that, in their view, hamper France's potential. Since Hugues Capet, they list and analyse various recurring facts and phenomena which, in their view, evoke a harmful constant: a mixture of centralism and interventionism at the top of the state. Comparisons with the United States and the United Kingdom conclude this committed historical fresco.

In Il faut sauver le Monde libre (We must save the Free World), published with Jean-Philippe Feldman in 2019, Mathieu Laine advocates freedom, warning of the dangers that, according to him, jeopardise the first of these values. He proposes to "put solidarity and concern for all human beings back at the heart of all our decisions".

Mathieu Laine has produced several prefaces, notably in 2014, L'Âge d'or du libéralisme français (Golden age of french liberalism), a 19th-century anthology by Robert Leroux and David Hart; in 2016, the preface to the collection of speeches by Margaret Thatcher, published by Les Belles Lettres; in 2017, the preface to Johan Norberg's book Non ce n'était pas mieux avant - 10 raisons d'avoir confiance en l'avenir (No, it wasn't always better before - 10 reasons to put faith in the future); and in 2018, the preface to the republication of Turgot's complete works, for which he has provided funding. He also prefaces Jean-Philippe Feldman's book, Exception française (French Exception), published in September 2020.

=== Classical music and literature ===
Mathieu Laine wrote the text of the musical tale for children, Le Roi qui n'aimait pas la musique, (The King who didn't like music) by Gallimard. Gathering several of his friends around this project, Mathieu Laine entrusted the musical composition to Karol Beffa and brought together artists Patrick Bruel, Renaud Capuçon, Paul Meyer and Edgar Moreau.

Le Roi qui n'aimait pas la musique has been performed at festivals in Aix-en-Provence, the Château de la Moutte in Saint-Tropez, the Sommets Musicaux in Gstaad, the International Chamber Music Festival in Salon-de-Provence, the French Institute in London and in Belgium at the Biéreau Farm for the East-West Festival. The Minister of Culture Roselyne Bachelot, then France Musique columnist, praised the project in November 2017. In addition, Karol Beffa composed and set to music his poem Pour Alix.

== Bibliography ==
- Discours of Margaret Thatcher in French, Editions Les Belles Lettres, 2016, 560 p. (978-2-251-39909-6)
- Dictionnaire amoureux de la liberté, Editions Plon, 2016, 848 p. (ISBN 978-2-259-22146-7)
- La France adolescente, in collaboration with Patrice Huerre, Editions J-C Lattès, 2013, 260 p. (ISBN 978-2709638043)
- Le dictionnaire du libéralisme, led by Mathieu Laine, Editions Larousse, "À présent" collection, 2012, 640 p. (ISBN 978-2-03-584185-8)
- Post politique, Éditions Jean-Claude Lattès, 2009. (ISBN 9782709630016) (Political literature Edgar-Faure Award - 2009)
- La France est foutue, Éditions Jean-Claude Lattès, 2007, 131 p. ISBN 2709629232
- La Grande Nurserie: En finir avec l'infantilisation des Français, Éditions Jean-Claude Lattès, 2006 ISBN 2709625059
- L'homme libre: Mélanges en l'honneur de Pascal Salin, Mathieu Laine & Jörg Guido Hülsmann, Les Belles Lettres, 2006, 529 p. ISBN 2251443142

== Awards ==
- Prix Edouard-Bonnefous of the French Academy of Moral and Political Sciences for the Dictionnaire du libéralisme (2012)
- Prix Edgar Faure for Post Politique (2009)
- Prix du livre libéral (ALEPS) for Post Politique (2009)

== Private life ==
Laine was married to Eleonore Salin, daughter of Pascal Salin (economist) with whom he has two children. After his divorce, he wed Alix Foriel-Destezet daughter of Philippe Foriel-Destezet (founder of Adecco) in 2015 with whom he has a daughter.
