= Célimène Daudet =

French-Haitian pianist (born 1977)

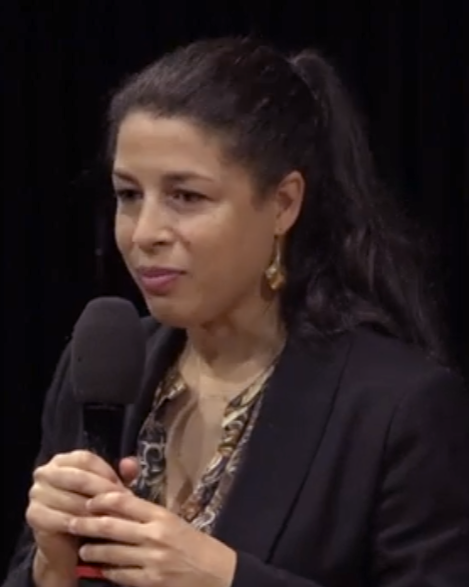
- At a 2024 performance
- Born: 1977 (age 48–49); Aix-en-Provence, France
- Education: Conservatoire national supérieur de musique et de danse de Lyon; Conservatoire de Paris
- Occupation: Pianist

Célimène Daudet (French: [selimɛn dodɛ]; born 1977) is a contemporary French classical pianist.

== Biography ==
Born in Aix-en-Provence to a French father and a Haitian mother, Daudet began her training at the Aix-en-Provence Conservatory with Michel Bourdoncle. She then studied at the Conservatoire à rayonnement régional de Paris in Olivier Gardon's class, the Conservatoire à rayonnement régional de Rueil-Malmaison in the class of Denis Pascal then at the Conservatoire national supérieur de musique et de danse de Lyon with Géry Moutier from where she graduated with a first prize, then to the Conservatoire de Paris in chamber music in cellist Jean Mouillère's class.

She performs on many prestigious stages in France and abroad in venues such as the Carnegie Hall in New York, the Philharmonies of Ninji and Rostov in Russia, the Astana Opera in Kazakhstan, the Opéra de Lyon, le Cent Quatre and the Théâtre du Châtelet in Paris, the Shanghai Oriental Arts Center, the Beijing National Center for performing Arts, in Canada, Israel, Germany, in the UAE, Brazil, Cuba, Colombia, Panama, Singapore, Malaysia, Vietnam, Indonesia and on many national stages throughout France. She made her debut at the Konzerthaus, Vienna of Vienna in 2017.

She performs in concertos with the Malaysian Philharmonic Orchestra (MPO), the National Orchestra of Vietnam, the Toulon Opera Orchestra, the Belem Symphony Orchestra, the Mulhouse Symphony Orchestra.

She played Bach's The Art of Fugue from 2011 to 2014 as part of the show Art of Fugue conceived and directed by the Yoann Bourgeois company.

She also collaborates with actress Marie-Christine Barrault, flutist Julien Beaudiment, soprano Camille Poul, violinists Amanda Favier and Guillaume Latour, choreographer Yoann Bourgeois.

Holder of the certificate of aptitude, she teaches at the Conservatory of the 8th arrondissement of Paris. She regularly gives masterclasses in France (Théâtre du Châtelet, académie de Nancy) and abroad (École des Arts de Rostov sur le Don, Académie de piano d'Abu Dhabi, Institut Supérieur des Arts de La Havane, Conservatoire Supérieur d'Almaty etc.). She was artistic director of the Lucien Durosoir Festival until 2015.

In 2016, she was at the initiative of Haïti Piano Project, bringing a concert piano to Haiti and created the first annual classical music festival in 2017.

=== Prizes and awards ===
Célimène Daudet is the winner of several international competitions (Concours international Jean Françaix, Concours International de Val d'Isère, Concours européen FNAPEC in Paris), she also won the International Prize Pro Musicis (Paris) in duet with violinist Guillaume Latour. She benefits from the support of the Safran Foundation and is named Artiste génération Spedidam 2014.

She is a Steinway Artist.

=== Discography ===
- 2011: A Tribute to Bach (Arion). It was awarded four stars by Classica. Œuvres de Bach, Bach-Busoni, Liszt, Franck, Mendelssohn.
- 2013: Bach' The Art of fugue (Arion)
- 2013: Dans la malle du Poilu with violinist Amanda Favier (Arion). Ce programme a reçu le label de la Mission du centenaire de la première guerre mondiale.
- 2016: Beethoven - sonatas 5, 3 and 10 with violinist Amanda Favier (NoMadMusic).
- 2018: Messiaen, Debussy - Preludes for piano (NoMadMusic).
