= Nicolas Dautricourt =

French violinist (born 1977)

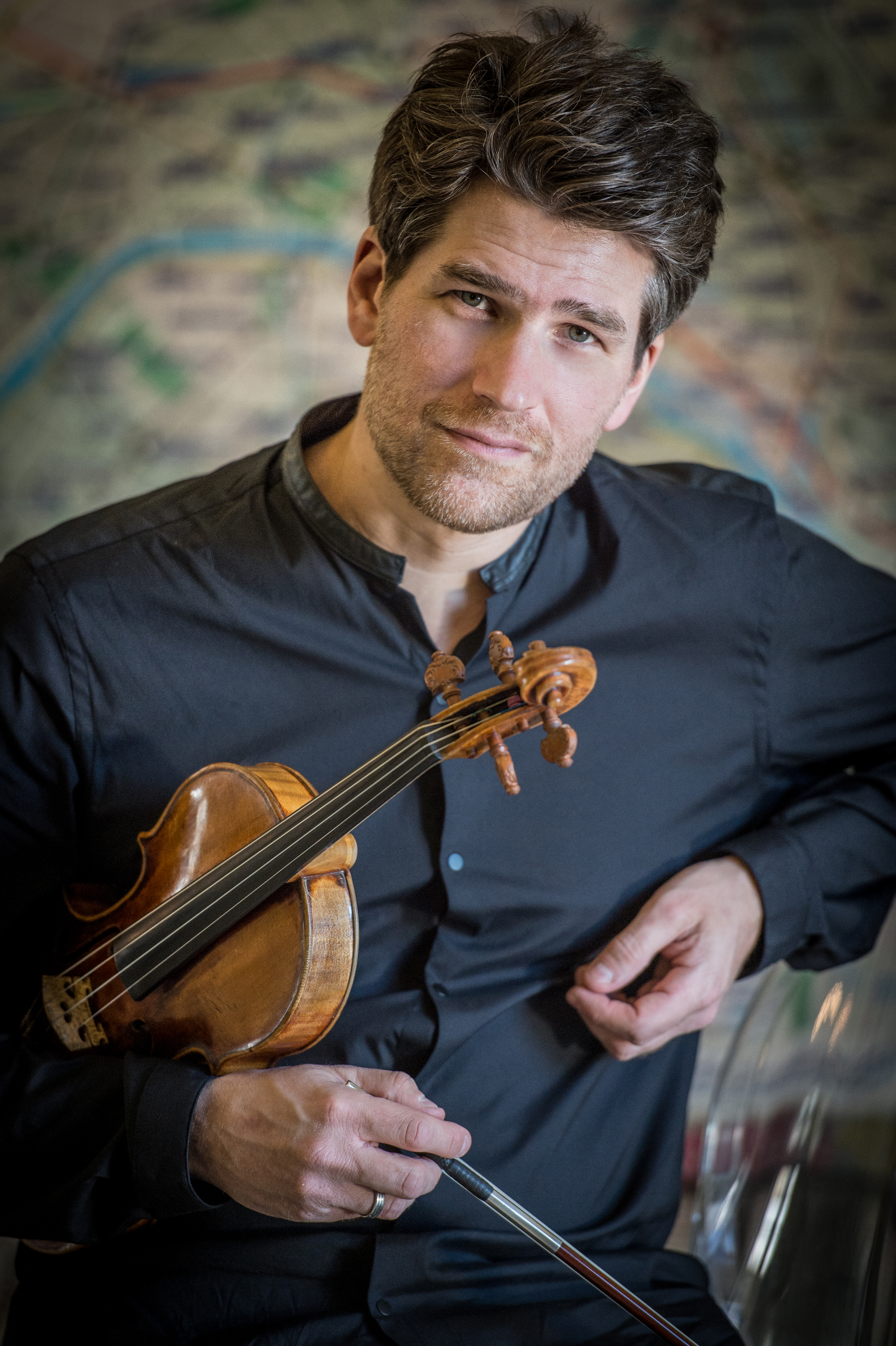

Background information
- Instrument: violin
- Website: www.nicolasdautricourt.com

Nicolas Dautricourt (born 1977) is a French violinist.

== Biography ==
Voted « ADAMI Classical Discovery of the Year » at the Midem in Cannes, awarded the Sacem « Georges Enesco Prize », guest artist at the 23rd Victoires de la Musique in Toulouse and a member of the Chamber Music Society of Lincoln Center in New York, Nicolas Dautricourt made in January 2019 his debuts at the Paris Philharmonie with Orchestre National d’Ile de France, performing Prokofiev second violin concert under British conductor Jamie Philipps, and appears regularly at major international venues, the Kennedy Center, Alice Tully Hall, Wigmore Hall, Moscow Tchaïkovsky Hall, Tokyo Bunka Kaikan, Salle Pleyel, Cité de la Musique and Théâtre des Champs-Elysées among others.

He also appears at many classical and jazz festival such as Lockenhaus Kammermusikfest, Enesco International Music Festival in Bucharest, Music@Menlo, Järvi Music Festival in Pärnu, Ravinia, Sintra, Davos, Tokyo and Nantes Folles Journées, Jazz à Vienne, Marciac Jazz Festival, Jazz à la Grange, and has performed with the Detroit Symphony, Royal Philharmonic Orchestra, Orchestre National de France, SWR Saarbrücken, BBC Wales National Orchestra, Aachen Symphony, Orchestre du Capitole de Toulouse, Quebec Symphony, Oulu Sinfonia, Liège Philharmonic, Sinfonia Varsovia, Novosibirsk Philharmonie, Kiev Philharmonic, Belgrad Philharmonic, International Players Busan, Mexico Philharmonic, Scala di Milano Ensemble, Yokohama Sinfonietta, Orchestra Ensemble Kanazawa, European Camerata, Orchestre National de Lorraine, Orchestre National des Pays de la Loire, Orchestre Philharmonique de Nice, Orchestre de Cannes, Orchestre de l'Opéra de Rouen, Orchestre de l'Opéra de St-Etienne, Orchestre de l’Opéra de Toulon, Sendai Strings Ensemble, Orchestre Philharmonique du Maroc, Baltic Chamber Orchestra, Orchestre des Pays de Savoie, Orchestre d’Auvergne, Orchestre Symphonique de Caen, Orchestre Pasdeloup, Orchestre Français des Jeunes, NHK Tokyo Chamber Orchestra and the Kanazawa Orchestral Ensemble, under conductors Leonard Slatkin, Paavo Järvi, Fabien Gabel, Yan-Pascal Tortelier, Tugan Sokhiev, Frédéric Chaslin, Stanislas Lefort, Philippe Auguin, David Niemann, Dennis Russell Davies, Wolfgang Doerner, Carlos-Miguel Prieto, Eivind Gullberg Jensen, Gabor Takacs-Nagy, Yuri Bashmet, Michaël Francis, François-Xavier Roth, Kazuki Yamada, Vahan Mardirossian, Jean-Jacques Kantorow, Mishiyoshi Inoue, Jacques Mercier, Mark Foster, Arie Van Beek and others.

Awarded in numerous international violin contests, such as Wieniawski, Lipizer and Belgrad, he has studied with Philip Hirschhorn, Miriam Fried and Jean-Jacques Kantorow, and teaches since 2021 at the Conservatoire à Rayonnement Régional de Versailles.

Artistic Director of the « Fêtes Musicales de Corbigny », Nicolas Dautricourt plays an instrument by Antonio Stradivarius, the "Château Pape Clément" (Cremona 1713), on a loan from Bernard Magrez, and in January 2021, has received from the French Ministry of Culture, the title of Chevalier des Arts et des Lettres.

== Discography ==
- The Enescu Project - Nicolas Dautricourt (violon), Quatuor Capriccio, Benedict Klöckner (violoncelle), David Gaillard (alto), Maya Koch (violon) - Orchid Classics 2022 (Distribution Naxos)
- « Symphonie pour la Vie » DoMiSi LaDoRé de N. Dautricourt, avec Dimitri Saroglou (piano) - Morgen de R.Strauss, avec Karine Deshayes (soprano) et Frank Braley (piano) - Fondation des Hôpitaux de Paris, Hôpitaux de France 2020 (Distribution Warner Music France)
- « Porgy & Bess revisited » Nicolas Dautricourt (violon), Pascal Schumacher (vibraphone), Knut-Erik Sundquist (contrebasse) - Orchid Classics 2019 (Distribution Naxos)
- Sanseverino & Tangomotan, Nicolas Dautricourt (violon), Stéphane Huchard (batterie) - Little Big Music 2019 (Distribution Sony Music Entertainment)
- Johann-Sebastian Bach, Six Sonates pour violon et piano BWV 1014-1019 - Nicolas Dautricourt (violon), Juho Pohjonen (piano) - la Dolce Volta 2018 (Distribution Harmonia Mundi)
- Benjamin Godard, intégrale des sonates pour violon et piano, World Premiere Recording - Nicolas Dautricourt (violon), Dana Ciocarlie (piano) - Aparte 2016 (Distribution Harmonia Mundi)
- Jacques Lenot, « la lettre au voyageur » - Nicolas Dautricourt (violon), Dana Ciocarlie (piano) - L’Oiseau prophète 2016
- « la symphonie des siècles » Félix Mendelssohn: Concerto pour violon op 64 - Nicolas Dautricourt (violon), François-Xavier Roth (direction) - Live recording (05/07/2015), Cité de la Musique et de la Danse de Soissons (02)
- « Humoresques » - Nicolas Dautricourt (violon), Juho Pohjonen (piano) Orchestra Vigo 430, dir Alejandro Garrido - la Dolce Volta 2015 (Distribution Harmonia Mundi)
- « Tonal Twilights » Schoenberg Transfigurations - Nicolas Dautricourt (violon), Bertrand Raynaud (violoncelle), Nicolas Baldeyrou (clarinette), Kazunori Seo (flûte), Laurent Wagschal & Jong-Hwa Park (piano) - Virtus Classics 2013 (Distribution Naxos)
- Joseph-Guy Ropartz, sonate pour violon et piano no 2 - Nicolas Dautricourt (violon), François Kerdoncuff (piano) - Timpani 2013
- Summertime : Jean Sugitani (piano) (La prima volta 2009)
- Karol Szymanowski : l’œuvre complète pour violon et piano - Laurent Wagschal (piano) (Saphir productions 2003)
- Ernest Chausson / Félix Mendelssohn : Concert op.21, Double Concerto - Orchestre d'Auvergne, Laurent Wagschal (piano), Arie van Beek (Calliope 2002, distribution Harmonia Mundi)

== Awards ==
- Chevalier de l’ordre des Arts et des Lettres - 2021
- Sacem Georges Enesco Prize - 2008
- Finalist Henryk Wieniawski International Competition Poznan (Pologne) - 2001
- Finalist International Competition Belgrad (Serbie) - 2001
- Special Prize Rodolfo Lipizer International Competition Gorizia (Italie) - 2001
- Lauréat "Natexis Foundation" - 1999/2001
- "Adami Classic Discovery", Midem de Cannes - 1999
