= Amanda Favier =

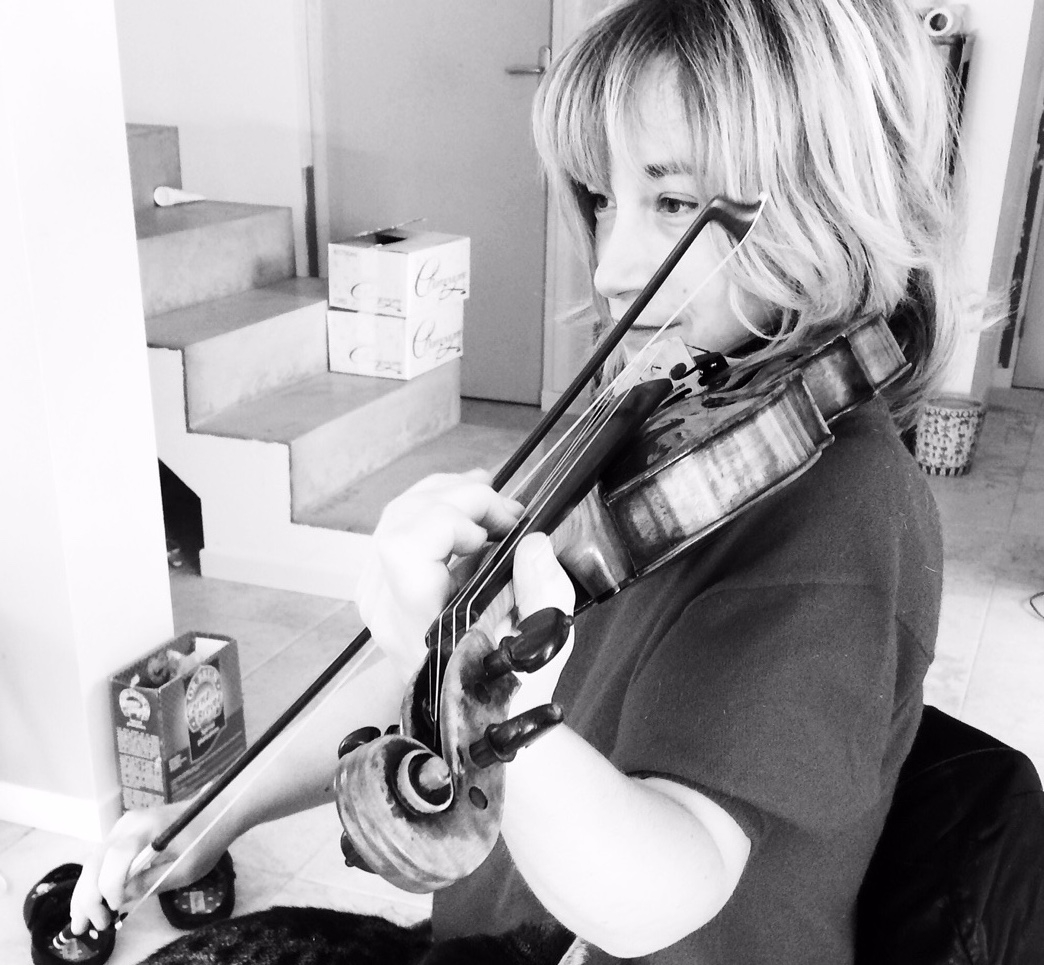

Background information
- Born: 7 April 1979 (age 47); Paris, France
- Instrument: Violin

Amanda Favier (born 7 April 1979 in Paris, France) is a French classical violinist.

== Early life and academics ==
Amanda Favier took her first piano lessons when she was four and started violin at six.

At 13, she joined the Conservatoire de Paris with Gérard Poulet as her main teacher. She was awarded 1st prize in violin and graduated cum laude. She then traveled in Europe to study with teachers including: Sir Ifrah Neaman in London, Igor Ozim in Cologne, Jean-Jacques Kantorow in Rotterdam and Suzanne Gessner.

== Awards and recognition ==
Favier performed publicly for the first time at the age of nine and was the youngest winner of the International Johann Sebastian Bach Competition in Leipzig.

She has won several international competitions.

Favier has also been awarded with the Forthuny prize of the Académie des Beaux Arts and Berthier prize of the Palmes Académiques. Several private foundations have also supported her like the Fondation Banque Populaire and the Mécénat Société Générale.

Her peers have also acknowledged her talent by awarding her the "Révélation classique" and then "Violon de l'Adami".

Her version of Vivaldi's The Four Seasons received the "Classique d'Or RTL", a "Attention Talent" (Fnac), Ait France's "Sélection du mois" but also a Coup de cœur from France Musique.

== Projects ==
Beyond her solo and chamber music activity, Favier often combines her music with other arts like poetry, literature, jazz, history, and visual arts, and has presented her work on French radio and TV on RTL, France-Musiques [1][2], FIP,[3] Radio Classique,[4] France 2 (1pm News,[5] "Tandem" show with Jean D'Ormesson) and France 3 ("Toute la musique qu'ils aiment" show).

She usually invites actors to participate to her projects. Brigitte Fossey, Marie Christine Barrault, François Castang and also Jean Marie Machado have been sharing the stage with her.

Her project, "De Venise à Venise, itinéraire d'un violon gâté", tells the story of her Venezian violin a Matteo Goffriler from 1723 to nowadays. Francois Castang has participated to this project as a lead actor for numerous concerts.

Favier has participated to the tribute to the French violinist and composer Lucien Durosoir with Célimène Daudet through the project Dans la Malle du Poilu. The public is invited to listen to pieces composed just after the First World War but also to discover the music that would comfort him on the battlefield. The letters he would send to his falmily from there are simultaneously read by Marie Christine Barrault, a French actress. This project has been awarded with the official "Centenaire" label by the Mission du centenaire de la Première guerre mondiale.

== Media and press ==
Favier is regularly invited to broadcast on French radio and TV on RTL, France-Musiques, FIP, Radio Classique, France 2 (1pm News, "Tandem" show with Jean D'Ormesson) and France 3 ("Toute la musique qu'ils aiment" show).

== Discography ==
- Sonatas by Richard Strauss and Leoš Janáček with Cédric Tiberghien, Lyrinx
- Album Claude Pascal, Polymnie
- Antonio Vivaldi's Four seasons with quintet (Classique d’or RTL), Saphir
- Le Violon de l’ADAMI, Sonatas by César Franck and Gabriel Fauré with Dana Ciocarlie, Promotion record
- Sonatas by Maurice Ravel and César Franck with Jean Dubé, Syrius
- Album Blanche Selva, with Laurent Martin, Ligia
- Dans la malle du Poilu with Célimène Daudet, Arion
