= Chôros bis =

Chôros bis (dois)
- by Heitor Villa-Lobos
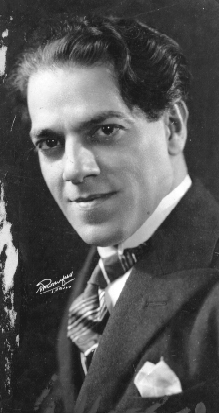
- Heitor Villa-Lobos
- English: Chôros Encores (Two)
- Catalogue: W227
- Genre: Chôros
- Form: Chôros
- Composed: 1928 – 1929: Paris
- Dedication: 1st movement: Jacques Serres; 2nd movement: Tony Close and Maurice Raskin
- Published: 1930: Paris
- Publisher: Max Eschig
- Duration: 8–9 mins.
- Movements: 2
- Scoring: Violin and cello

Premiere
- Date: 14 March 1930:
- Location: Salle Chopin
- Performers: Tony Close, violin; André Asselin, cello

Chôros bis, or Dois Chôros (bis) (Two Chôros encores), first published with the title in French, Deux Chôros (bis), is a two-movement duo for violin and cello by the Brazilian composer Heitor Villa-Lobos, peripherally related to his numbered series of fourteen Chôros. A performance typically lasts between eight and nine minutes.

== History ==
Villa-Lobos composed the Chôros bis in Paris in 1928–29, and they were first given a private reading on 29 June 1929 at the residence of Mme Frédéric Moreau in Paris, performed by Tony Close (violin) and André Asselin (cello) under the provisional title Duo (Chôros bis). The public premiere was given by the same performers on 14 March 1930 at the Salle Chopin, Paris, as part of the Festival de Musique Moderne, in a concert that also included the world premieres of the Quinteto (em forma de chôros), the Cirandas for piano, and the Chansons typiques brésiliennes. The manuscript scores of the two movements bear separate dedications: the first to Jacques Serres, the second to Tony Close and Maurice Raskin. These two short movements were not originally intended as part of the series of fourteen Chôros but, as their characteristics are similar to most of those compositions, Villa-Lobos proposed them as an "encore", in case such a thing might be required following a complete performance of the entire series which, prefaced by the Introdução aos Chôros, would last about three hours.

== Analysis ==
Unlike any of the fourteen numbered Chôros, the Dois Chôros bis consist of two separate movements:

- Moderé
- Lent – animé

Extensive use of multiple stops and harmonics in both instruments enables the two players occasionally to sound like an orchestra.

The first movement is constructed from pentatonic sets, manipulated in various ways to create harmonic organization, and eventually to generate and maintain modal diatonic patterns. In this way, the interaction between pentatonic and diatonic textures takes on a structural function. At first, the pentatonic scale on A (A–C–D–E–G) is used by itself, without any "foreign" notes, and is presented in two significant subsets: the minor seventh chord (A–C–E–G)—a characteristic sound used by Béla Bartók in folk music-harmonization—and a pair of 035 trichords, sharing a common tone (E-G-A / A-C-D). By transposing the basic five-note set a perfect fifth upward (to (E-G-A-B-D), Villa-Lobos first unfolds an A-Aeolian hexachord, and then adds the note F over a quartal harmony in bar 5 to complete the diatonic Aeolian mode. Around these core diatonic tones, there are some auxiliary "chromatic infections" (infecções cromáticas), F♯ and A♯, hinting at a chromatic motive that will be used later on.

The second movement is richer in counterpoint than the first, and includes an inventive effect for the composer's own instrument, the cello, in which a G♯ on the third (G) string is played above a C♯ on the second (D) string, in order to produce the effect of drums and pizzicato at the same time.
