= Quinteto (em forma de chôros) =

Musical composition by Heitor Villa-Lobos

Portuguese: Quinteto (em forma de chôros)
- by Heitor Villa-Lobos
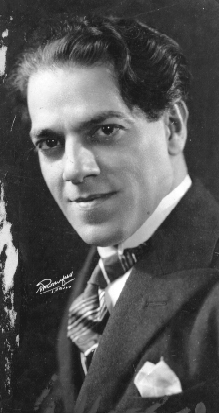
- Heitor Villa-Lobos
- English: Quintet (in the Form of a Chôros)
- Catalogue: W231
- Genre: Chamber music
- Form: Chôros
- Composed: 1928: Paris
- Published: 1953: Paris
- Publisher: Max Eschig
- Duration: 11 minutes
- Movements: 1
- Scoring: Flute, oboe, cor anglais (or horn), clarinet, and bassoon

Premiere
- Date: 14 March 1930
- Location: Salle Chopin, Paris
- Performers: Gaston Crunelle (flute), Louis Mercier (oboe), Paul-Gustave Brun (cor anglais), Louis Cahuzac (clarinet), and Auguste Lenom (bassoon)

The Quinteto (em forma de chôros) (French: Quintette (en forme de chôros) = Quintet (in the Form of a Chôros)) is a chamber-music composition by the Brazilian composer Heitor Villa-Lobos, written in 1928. Originally scored for five woodwind instruments (flute, oboe, cor anglais, clarinet, and bassoon), it is most often performed in an arrangement for the conventional wind quintet of flute, oboe, clarinet, horn, and bassoon. A performance lasts about eleven minutes.

== History ==
Villa-Lobos composed the work in Paris in 1928, during the same period in which he was working on the series of fourteen Chôros. The first manuscript fair-copy score is titled simply "Quintetto para flauta, oboé, corn'inglez, clarinete e fagote". The subtitle was added only after the premiere in 1930. Although it was not originally intended as part of the Chôros series, some writers (e.g. Neves, Wright, and Appleby have treated it as related.

It was first performed on 14 March 1930 at the Salle Chopin in Paris, on the same concert (part of the Festival de Musique Moderne) with the premieres of Chôros bis (for violin and cello), the Cirandas (for piano), and the Chansons typiques brésiliennes. The performers in the Quintet were Gaston Crunelle, flute; Louis Mercier, oboe; Paul-Gustave Brun, cor anglais; Louis Cahuzac, clarinet; and Auguste Lenom, bassoon. The score was only first published in 1953, by Max Eschig, in an edition that includes alternative passages to facilitate the substitution of the (French) horn for the cor anglais.) This alternative scoring for conventional wind quintet undoubtedly improved chances for performances.

== Analysis ==
The Quintet consists of a loose succession of five large sections played continuously, each of which can be parsed into smaller subsections. The change from one large section to the next is marked by a decided change of texture and tempo. A free rhythmic organization, reflected by frequent changes of metre and tempo and reinforced by a deliberate tonal freedom, produces a quality of spontaneity.
