= Arie van Beek =

Dutch music teacher and conductor

- Born: 1951 (age 74–75); Rotterdam, Netherlands
- Occupation: Orchestral Conductor

Arie van Beek (born 1951) is a Dutch music teacher and conductor.

== Biography ==
Arie van Beek was born in Rotterdam in 1951, the son of Joost van Beek, conductor and long-term secretary of the Association of Orchestra Conductors. He studied percussion and orchestra conducting at the Rotterdam Conservatory under Edo de Waart and David Porcelijn. For four years he worked as a percussionist with the radio orchestras of the NIS. He is affiliated with the Rotterdam Conservatory where he teaches conducting and is conductor of the Rotterdam Young Philharmonic, orchestra and chamber orchestra, and of ensembles of the classical department. He has been artistic director of the Meuse Ensemble, the Rotterdam-based ensemble for contemporary music, from its inception.

In the Netherlands, he has regularly worked as guest conductor of the Amsterdam Wind Orchestra, the Dutch Dance Theatre, the Brabants Orchestra, the North Holland Philharmonic Orchestra, National Ballet, the Delta Ensemble, Asko Ensemble, the Nieuw Ensemble and the Little Opera Foundation. He is a regular guest conductor with the orchestras of Avignon and Poitou-Charentes in France, the orchestras of Örebro, Sundsvall and Linköping in Sweden and the Östgöta Wind Orchestra in Switzerland. He has also been guest conductor of the radio orchestra of Lugano, the chamber orchestra of Pardubice in the Czech Republic, the Nordwestdeutsche Philharmonie in Germany and the Bangkok Symphony Orchestra in Thailand.

Since 1994 he has been chief conductor of the Ochestre d'Auvergne, France. With this orchestra he gives about 60 concerts a year in France and he has toured the Netherlands, Belgium, Germany, Italy, Spain, Morocco and Japan. He is also the permanent conductor of the Doelenensemble, which specializes in repertoire from the 20th and 21st century, and which has created many CD recordings.

== Interests and recognition ==
Arie van Beek’s conducts works that range from the baroque period to the 21st century. He is particularly interested in contemporary music, and has conducted first performances of works by such composers as Karol Beffa, Guillaume Connesson, Kaija Sarraiho, Aulis Sallinen, Peter-Jan Wagemans, Klaas de Vries, Hans Koolmies, Domenique Lemaitre, Andre Serre-Milan, Jean-Pascal Beintus and Suzanna Giraud.

In November 2003 the city of Rotterdam gave Arie van Beek the Elly Ameling Prize for his work as conductor during the last 30 years. In April 2007 Renaud Donnedieu de Vabres, French minister of Culture and Communication, made Arie van Beek "Chevalier des Arts et des Lettres". In February 2008 he was awarded the City Medal of Clermont Ferrand.

== Discography ==
Some of his recordings as conductor are:

| Year | Work | Album | Label | Notes |
|---|---|---|---|---|
| 1997 | Express(s) | Paul Termos | Donemus | Doelenensemble |
| 1998 | Various works | Romantisch Wijn Concert | Music DeLux | CD compilation, promotion disc |
| 1999 | Various works | Chants Sacrés D'Orient Et D'Occident | Virgin Classics | 2xCD, Album - Ensemble De La Paix choir |
| 2005 | Adagio From De Fesch Violin Concerto No. 2 | Cooldown Classix | Impogram | Part of 3xCD compilation |
| 2007 | Piano Concerto No. 1 In E Minor Op. 11: Romance, Larghetto | Classic Relaxz Volume 2 | Happinez | |
| 2008 | Larghetto, From Piano Concerto No. 2 In F Minor Op. 21 | Classical Chillout | Brilliant Classics | Part of 2xCD compilation |
| | Intermezzo | Schumann* - Concertos (Complete) | Brilliant Classics | part of 2xCD |
