= Maurice Raskin =

Belgian violinist (1906–1984)

Maurice Raskin (1906 – 1984) was a Belgian violinist.

Born in Liège, Raskin, a student of Édouard Nadaud (violin) and Lucien Capet (chamber music), was one of the best Belgian violinists of his time. During his exile in England during the Second World War, he founded the "Belgian London Quartet". Laureate of the International Fritz Kreisler Competition in 1928, he made a long career as a concert and chamber musician, documented also by numerous recordings, including those with the "Maurice Raskin Quartet". In 1928, his friend, composer Heitor Villa-Lobos, dedicated to him the second of his Chôros bis (W 227) and Jean Absil, his Chaconne for solo violin Op.69 (1949).

Raskin had been a professor of chamber music at the Royal Conservatory of Brussels since 1936 and appointed violin teacher in 1939. He was appointed first violin teacher at the Maastricht Conservatory in 1956. Among his students were Francis Duroy, Georges Octors and Sigiswald Kuijken with his wife Marleen Thiers.

He was appointed member of many juries for violin competitions: the Queen Elisabeth Competition, the Conservatoire de Paris competition and that of the Moscow Conservatory.

He bequeathed his music collection to a special foundation at the library of the Royal Conservatory of Brussels.
