= Pascal Salin =

French economist

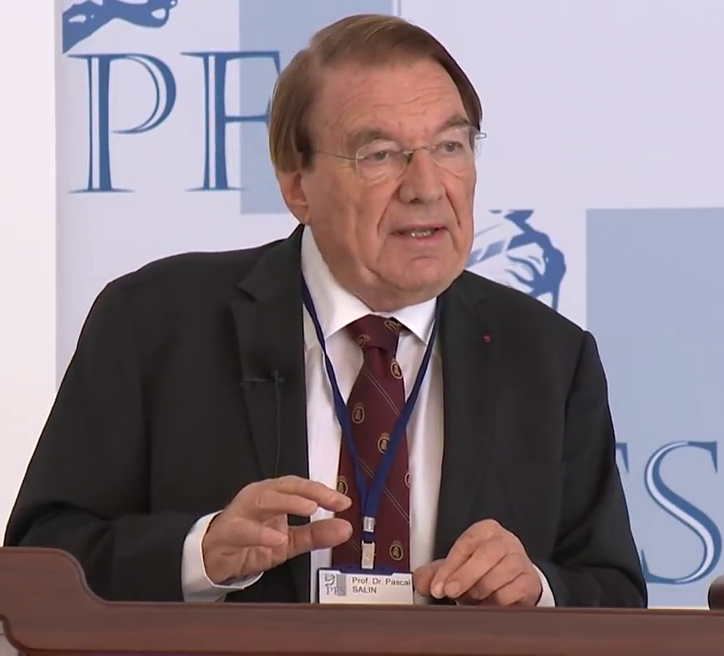
- Born: May 16, 1939 (age 87)

Academic background
- Education: University of Bordeaux; Instituts d'études politiques
- Influences: Jacques Rueff; Friedrich Hayek; Ludwig von Mises; Milton Friedman; Robert Mundell

Academic work
- School or tradition: Austrian School, Chicago School
- Institutions: Université Paris-Dauphine
- Notable students: Jörg Guido Hülsmann
- Awards: Chevalier de la Légion d'honneur Chevalier des Arts et des Lettres

Pascal Salin (born May 16, 1939) is a French economist, professor emeritus at the Université Paris-Dauphine and a specialist in public finance and monetary economics. He is a former president of the Mont Pelerin Society (1994 to 1996).

== Biography ==
After undergraduate studies in law at the University of Bordeaux, Salin studied economics in Paris and graduated from the Instituts d'études politiques. While graduating in sociology with a licence, he started a doctorate in economics and obtained his agrégation d'économie. At the age of 22, he lectured in economics at the universities of Paris, Poitiers, and Nantes. In 1970, he became University Professor at the Université Paris-Dauphine where he stayed until his retirement in 2009. At Dauphine he co-founded the Jean-Baptiste Say research center in economics.

Salin has been a consultant for the International Monetary Fund, the United Nations, the Food and Agriculture Organization, and the Harvard Institute for International Development. He is a frequent contributor to the French newspapers Le Figaro and Les Echos. He has published several articles in many other French media outlets such as Le Monde. He also publishes in the Wall Street Journal Europe. Mathieu Laine and Jörg Guido Hülsmann co-edited a festschrift in honor of Salin in 2006. He was made Chevalier de la Légion d'honneur and Chevalier des Arts et des Lettres, as well as Officier des Palmes Académiques. He was awarded the Prix renaissance de l'économie in 1986.

== Work ==
In the 1960s and 1970s, Salin was influenced by Milton Friedman and monetarism, Jacques Rueff and his view of the international monetary order, as well as Harry Gordon Johnson and his monetary approach to the balance of payments. Robert Mundell's work also played a part in Salin's own approach to economics, especially regarding the topics of supply-side economics and optimum currency areas. Salin aided in awarding Mundell the degree of Doctor Honoris Causa from the Université de Paris-Dauphine in 1992. Salin and his colleague, Emil-Maria Claassen, contributed to the European research on these subjects throughout the 1960s and 1970s.

Salin later became interested in the Austrian school of economics. In addition to Friedrich Hayek, who was one of Salin's intellectual mentors, Salin has been influenced by the works of Frédéric Bastiat, Israel Kirzner, Ludwig von Mises, Murray Rothbard, and Jean-Baptiste Say. Salin opposes full-reserve banking and supports unregulated free banking and fractional reserves. He rejects the theory of John Maynard Keynes and sees it as an aberration in the evolution of economic ideas.

== Selected bibliography ==
Salin publishes primarily in French and has mostly published works in monetary theory and policy. In the 1970s and 1980s, he authored many articles on the European monetary system. In recent years, he has published books defending the system of free enterprise and the philosophy of classical liberalism in France. Among his works of note are:

- Revenir au capitalisme : Pour éviter les crises, Odile Jacob, (2010)
- Français, n'ayez pas peur du libéralisme, Odile Jacob, (2007)
- L'arbitraire fiscal ou comment sortir de la crise (1996)
- La concurrence (1995)
- Libre-échange et protectionnisme (1991)
- Macroéconomie (1991)
- La vérité sur la monnaie (1990)
- L'ordre monétaire mondial (1982)
- L'unité monétaire au profit de qui? (1980)
- Recent Issues in International Monetary Economics, New York: North-Holland (1976) with Emil-Maria Claassen, eds.
- Stabilization Policies in Interdependent Economies, Amsterdam: North-Holland Pub. Co. (1972) with Emil-Maria Claassen.
