= Karol Beffa =

French musician (born 1973)

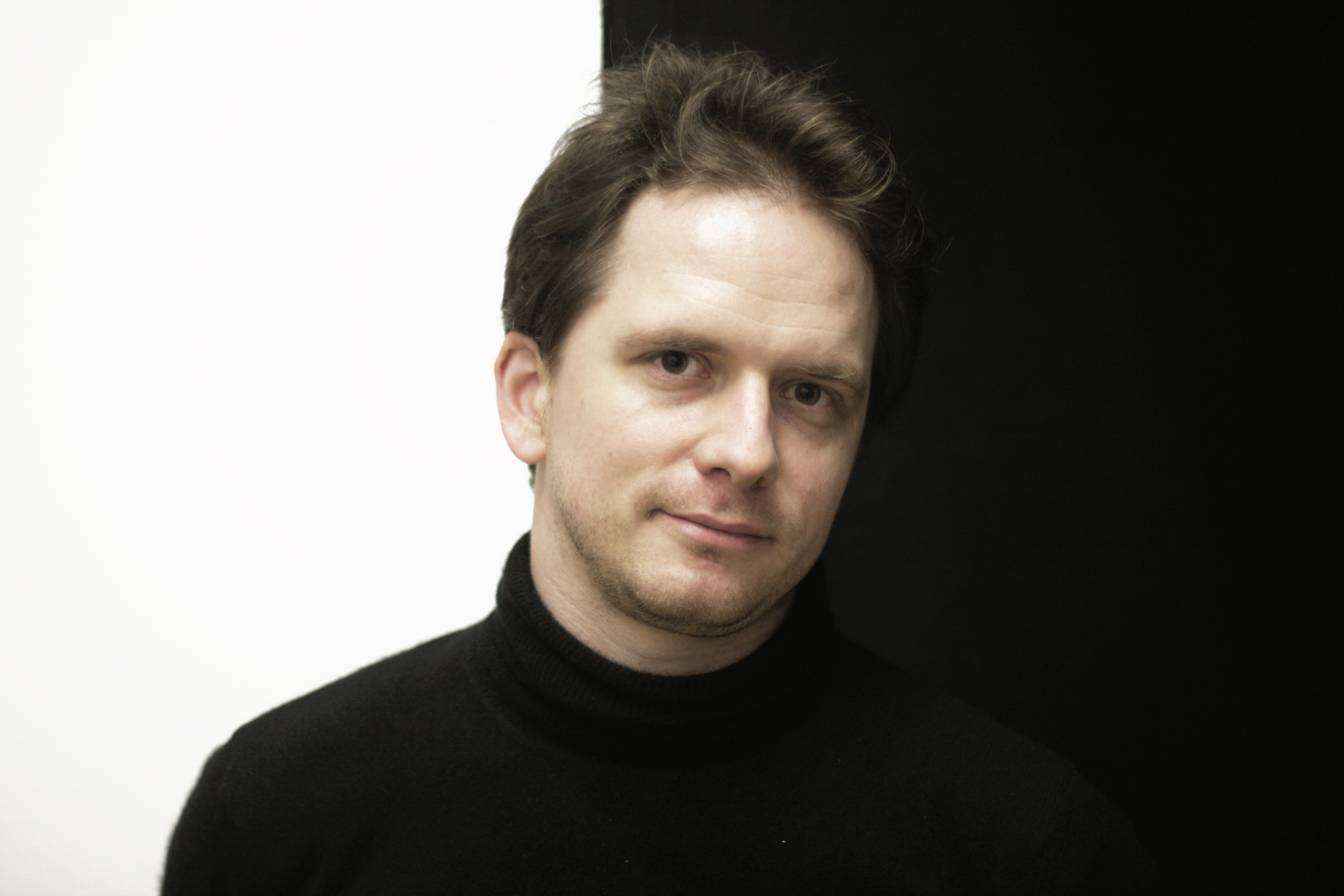
- Born: 27 October 1973 (age 52); Paris
- Other names: Karol Befat, Karol Zuber
- Education: École normale supérieure ENSAE Paris; Conservatoire de Paris
- Website: karolbeffa.net

Karol Beffa, born on 27 October 1973 in Paris, is a French composer and pianist.

== Biography ==
Beffa is the son of French-Swiss linguist and ethnologist Marie-Lise Beffa and French linguist Richard Zuber, and the nephew of industrialist Jean-Louis Beffa. He studied at École normale supérieure, then economics at ENSAE Paris and at Trinity College, Cambridge.

Beffa studied harmony, counterpoint, fugue, music theory, improvisation and composition at the Conservatoire de Paris, France's premier higher musical education institution, where he won eight first prizes. He taught at Paris-Sorbonne University and at École polytechnique. He wrote his PhD (2003) on György Ligeti's Etudes for piano. Since 2004, he has been an associate professor at the Ecole Normale Supérieure.

As a composer, his catalogue consists of several hundred works which have been performed in countries including China, France, Germany, Italy, Japan, Russia, the United Kingdom, and the United States by ensembles that include the Maîtrise de Radio France, Chœur de l'Orchestre de Paris, Cambridge Voices, Ensemble Notabu, Orchestre philharmonique de Radio France, Orchestre National de France, Orchestre de Paris, Saint Petersburg Philharmonic, London Symphony Orchestra, and Deutsche Kammerphilharmonie Bremen. His practice as a pianist has influenced his work as a composer.

Beffa's works are also part of the repertoire of individual musicians that include Gautier Capuçon, Renaud Capuçon, Emmanuel Ceysson, Bertrand Chamayou, Karine Deshayes, Kristjan Järvi, Paavo Järvi, Victor Julien-Laferrière, Nathan Laube, Marie-Pierre Langlamet, Anneleen Lenaerts, Paul Meyer, Edgar Moreau, Andreas Ottensamer, Akiko Suwanai, the Ébène Quartet, and the Modigliani Quartet. He has been composer in residence with the Orchestre National du Capitole de Toulouse from 2006 to 2009.

== Musical work ==
=== As a performer ===
- 2008 : Improvisations, Intrada
- 2008 : Masques, Mirages, with Johan Farjot, Triton
- 2011 : Songs, Ensemble Contraste, Contraste/Naïve
- 2013 : Bach transcriptions, Ensemble Contraste, La dolce volta
- 2013 : Alcools, Le Bestiaire, improvisations by Karol Beffa (Apollinaire read by Bernard Métraux), Gallimard
- 2014 : Miroir(s), by Karol Beffa, Johan Farjot, Raphaël Imbert and Arnaud Thorette, Naïve arrangements de Purcell, Bach, Mozart, Erik Satie, Karol Beffa, Johan Farjot, Raphaël Imbert
- 2015 : Libres, by Karol Beffa and Raphaël Imbert, JazzVillage/Harmonia Mundi
- 2015 : Into the Dark : Concerto pour alto, Concerto pour harpe, Nuit obscure, Dédale, with Johan Farjot, Arnaud Thorette, Karine Deshayes, Emmanuel Ceysson, Aparte
- 2016 : Tous en cœur, ensemble Contraste
- 2016 : Blow Up, musique de chambre avec vents, Indesens
- 2017 : Le Roi qui n'aimait pas la musique : text by Mathieu Laine, with Patrick Bruel (reader), Renaud Capuçon (violin), Edgar Moreau (cello), Paul Meyer (clarinet) and Karol Beffa (piano), livre-disque Gallimard jeunesse
- 2018 : En Blanc et Noir, Indesens : piano improvisations
- 2019 : De l'autre côté du miroir, Indesens : piano improvisations
- 2020 : Tohu Bohu, Blow in, Indesens : by Karol Beffa (piano), Saxo Voce
- 2020 : Talisman, Destroy, Klarthe : by Karol Beffa (piano), Quatuor Renoir

=== As a composer ===
Is written first the name of the music record, then the name of the compositions by Karol Beffa which appear on the music record.

- 2005 : Inventions : Masques I et II, by Renaud and Gautier Capuçon, Virgin Classics
- 2006 : Dutilleux : Sonate – Beffa : 6 études, Voyelles pour piano, by Lorène de Ratuld, Ame Son
- 2006 : Debussy en miroir : Trois Études pour piano, by Dana Ciocarlie, Triton
- 2006 : Tenebrae : Metropolis, by Arnaud Thorette, and Johan Farjot, Accord/Universal
- 2008 : Masques : Les ombres qui passent, Mirages, Supplique, Manhattan, Masques 1 & 2, Milonga, ensemble Contraste and Karol Beffa, Triton
- 2008 : Duo Romain Leleu et Julien Le Pape : Subway, by Romain Leleu and Julien Le Pape, Indesens
- 2008 : Après une lecture de Bach..., by Marina Chiche, Intrada
- 2008 : Anneleen Lenaerts : Éloge de l’ombre, by Anneleen Lenaerts, Egon Records
- 2009 : Bachianas et transcriptions : Erbarme dich, by David Bismuth,
- 2010 : Fantasy : Buenos Aires, Feeling Brass quintet, Aparte
- 2012 : L’œil du Loup, Gallimard, with l'Orchestre de chambre de Paris (text from Daniel Pennac)
- 2013 : Ground IV : Feux d’artifice, by the Quatuor de clarinettes Vendôme, Indesens
- 2014 : Miroir(s) : Chinatown, "Je t'invoque", "Cathédrales", par Karol Beffa, Johan Farjot, Raphaël Imbert, Arnaud Thorette, Naive
- 2014 : [R]évolution : Suite pour piano, by Vanessa Benelli Mosell, Decca
- 2014 : Saxophone Conversations : Obsession, by Alicja Wolynczyk, DUX
- 2015 : Trumpet concertos : Concerto pour trompette et cordes, by Romain Leleu (trompette), Orchestre d’Auvergne, dir. Roberto Forés Veses, Aparte
- 2015 : French touch : Five o'clock, by the Klarthe Quintet, Klarthe
- 2015 : Into the Dark : Concerto pour alto, Concerto pour harpe, Dark, Nuit obscure, Dédale, with Johan Farjot, Arnaud Thorette, Karine Deshayes, Emmanuel Ceysson et Karol Beffa, Aparte
- 2016 : Blow Up, musique de chambre avec vents, : Blow up, Éloge de l'ombre, Paysages d'ombres, Subway, Concerto pour trompette, Feux d'artifice, Indesens avec l'Orchestre de la Garde républicaine dir. by Sébastien Billard, Éric Aubier, Vincent Lucas, le quatuor Jean-Yves Fourmeau, l'ensemble Initium...
- 2017 : Itinérances musicales : Concerto pour trompette, by Guy Touvron, Ligia Digital
- 2017 : Pulse : Les Météores, by le quatuor Eclisses, Advitam Records
- 2017 : Le Roi qui n'aimait pas la musique : conte musical, text by Mathieu Laine, with Patrick Bruel (reader), Renaud Capuçon (violin), Edgar Moreau (cello), Paul Meyer (clarinet) and Karol Beffa (piano), livre-disque Gallimard jeunesse
- 2017 : The World's best loved classical piano pieces : "Erbarme dich", by Alena Cherny
- 2018 : Crime : Fireworks for saxophones quartet, by the Whoop Group, Sarton Records
- 2018 : Les Doudous lyriques : Dans le labyrinthe et L'Enfant dort for mixa choir a cappella, by le Chœur 43, OutHere
- 2018 : Douze Etudes : for piano, by Tristan Pfaff
- 2019 : Les Maîtres Sorciers : Mémorial : for harmony orchestra, by la Musique des gardiens de la paix, dir. Gildas Harnois, Hafabra
- 2019 : A Kind of Wind, Obsession, Indesens : by Nicolas Prost (saxophone)
- 2020 : Tohu Bohu, Blow in, Indesens : by Karol Beffa (piano), Saxo Voce
- 2020 : Musique française pour harpe, violon et violoncelle, Soleil noir, La Ferme ! Records : by Trio Jenlis
- 2020 : Talisman, Les Ruines circulaires, Talisman, "Destroy", "Tenebrae", "Le Bateau ivre", Klarthe : by Orchestre national de France, Orchestre philharmonique de Radio France, Karol Beffa (piano), Renoir Quartet
- 2021 : Call of Beauty, clarinet, horn et piano, Les Ombres errantes, Klarthe, by Julien Chabod (clarinet), Pierre Rémondière (horn) et Julien Gernay (piano)
- 2021 : Music for Four Musicians, for two pianos and two percussions, Music for Four Musicians, Landr : by the Essor quartet
- 2022 : Un Français à Rio, for violin and piano, Un Français à Rio, Chronos Productions : by Grégoire Girard and César Birschner
- 2022 : Media Vita, De Profundis, Solstice, Sérénade d'hiver, Deux Poèmes de Guillaume Apollinaire, Les Cités de l'oubli, Media Vita, Nel mezzo del cammin, Rocking-Chair, Fragments of China, Self-Portrait, Klarthe : by Karol Beffa (piano), Jeanne Gérard (soprano), Arnaud Thorette (alto), Lionel Sow
- 2023 : Rainbow, for piano and string orchestra, on the vinyle Le Grand Numéro de Chanel (choice of Bertrand Burgalat), label Tricatel : by Karol Beffa et l'ensemble Contraste, dir. Johan Farjot
- 2023 : Tabula rasa, for violin and piano, Change, Cypres : by Elsa de Lacerda et Pierre Solot
- 2023 : Contes persans, Transcribed and narrated by Leili Anvar, Frémeaux : music by Karol Beffa

== Books, speeches and articles ==
- Karol Beffa, Comment parler de musique ? : [leçon inaugurale prononcée le 25 octobre 2012], Paris, Collège de France/Fayard, 6 février 2013, 64 p. (ISBN 978-2-213-67200-7, lire en ligne)

In English: https://journals.openedition.org/lettre-cdf/2672

- Karol Beffa et Cédric Villani, Les coulisses de la création, Paris, Flammarion, 14 novembre 2015, 256 p. (ISBN 978-2-08-136070-9)
- Karol Beffa, György Ligeti, Paris, Fayard, 18 mai 2016, 464 p. (ISBN 978-2-213-70124-0). (Prix René-Dumesnil de l'Académie des Beaux-Arts, Grand Prix des Muses-France musique)
- Karol Beffa (dir.), Les nouveaux chemins de l’imaginaire musical, Paris, Collège de France, coll. « Conférences », 2016 (ISBN 978-2-7226-0433-9, lire en ligne)
- Karol Beffa, De quelques bons et mauvais usages de l’imposture en musique comme ailleurs, revue Approches, juin 2016 (ISBN 978-2-919630-17-2)
- Karol Beffa, Parler, composer, jouer : Sept leçons sur la musique, Paris, Seuil, 9 mars 2017, 240 p. (ISBN 978-2-02-135234-4)
- Sylvain Tesson, Luc Ferry, Michela Marzano, Claudia Senik, Boris Cyrulnik, Leili Anvar et Karol Beffa, Sept voix sur le bonheur, 23 février 2017, 179 p. (ISBN 978-2-84990-493-0)
- Karol Beffa, Diabolus in Opéra : composer avec la voix, Paris, Alma, coll. « Concerto », janvier 2018, 184 p. (ISBN 978-2-36279-253-3)
- Karol Beffa, Par volonté et par hasard : Théorie et pratique de la création musicale, Paris, Éditions de la Sorbonne, coll. « Itinéraires », 2018, 213 p. (ISBN 979-10-351-0048-3, lire en ligne)
- János Garay (trad. du hongrois par Guillaume Métayer, préf. Karol Beffa, postface Guillaume Métayer), Háry János, le vétéran : Poème original de János Garay, Paris, éditions du félin, 14 juin 2018, 72 p. (ISBN 978-2-86645-876-8)
- Karol Beffa et Jacques Perry-Salkow, Anagrammes à quatre mains. Une histoire vagabonde des musiciens et de leurs œuvres, Actes Sud, novembre 2018. (Prix Pelléas - Radio classique 2019)
- Karol Beffa, Aleksi Cavaillez et Guillaume Métayer, Ravel. Un imaginaire musical, roman graphique, Seuil/Delcourt, août 2019 (mention spéciale du jury du Prix Livres & Musiques de Deauville 2020)
- Karol Beffa, Emanuele Coccia, Charline Coupeau, Erik Gonthier, Julia Hetta, Amin Jaffer, Dominique Jakob, Marc Jeanson, Brendan MacFarlane, Frédéric Malle, Carole Martinez, Sophie Pelletier, Evelyne Possémé, Benoît Repellin, Joana Vasconcelos, L'Âme du bijou, Paris, Flammarion, 13 octobre 2021, 288 p. (english translation under the title of The Soul of Jewellery, Paris, Flammarion)
- Karol Beffa, Saint-Saëns au fil de la plume, Paris, Premières Loges, 24 novembre 2021, 300 p.
- Karol Beffa, L'autre xxe siècle musical, Paris, Buchet-Chastel, 2022, 240 p.
- Karol Beffa et Guillaume Métayer, Le Mystérieux Boléro. Sol et Rémi avec Ravel, Paris, Seghers, 2022, 100 p.
- Karol Beffa et Guillaume Métayer, Le Bal au clair de lune. Sol et Rémi avec Beethoven, Paris, Seghers, 2022, 100 p.
- Karol Beffa et Guillaume Métayer, Le Château de Monsieur Gymnopède. Sol et Rémi avec Satie, Paris, Seghers, 2023, 100 p.

== Acting ==
Beffa was a child actor between the ages of 7 and 12, between 1981 (7 years old) and 1989 (14 years old).

=== Cinema ===
- 1983 : Femmes de personne, by Christopher Frank : Arnaud, the son of Marthe Keller and Pierre Arditi
- 1984 : La Septième Cible, de Claude Pinoteau : le petit Pierre, the son of Lino Ventura
- 1987 : Dernière Fugue, by Miguel Vassy
- 2007 : Sur ta joue ennemie, by Jean-Xavier de Lestrade : a doctor
- 2013 : Je ne suis pas mort, de Mehdi Ben Attia : professor Berthier
- 2019 : Le Chant du loup, de Antonin Baudry : marine officer

=== Television ===
- 1981 : L’Enfant de cœur, by Jacques Cornet : Jean-Baptiste
- 1982 : Délit de fuite, by Paul Seban : Jean, the son of Aurore Clément and Jean-Luc Bideau
- 1982 : Mozart, by Marcel Bluwal : young Mozart (édition DVD)
- 1982 : Paris-Saint-Lazare, by Marco Pico : one of the Belleau's son
- 1982 : Le Crime de Pierre Lacaze, by Jean Delannoy
- 1983 : Dans la citadelle, by Peter Kassovitz : Jérôme Barjols, the son of Claude Rich
- 1983 : Merci Sylvestre, by Serge Korber : Gaspard
- 1984 : Camille ma sœur, by Olivier Descamps: Olivier
- 1984 : Image interdite, by Jean-Daniel Simon : Tommy Guy
- 1984 : Quidam, by Gérard Marx
- 1989 : Les Millionnaires du jeudi, by Claude Grinberg
- 2015 : The Darwinners (episode "Les piano-sapiens"), by Jul : the piano teacher (voice)

=== Theatre ===
- 1983 : La Bonne Âme du Se-Tchouan, by Bertolt Brecht, directed by Giorgio Strehler
- 1984 : Liberté à Brême, by Rainer Werner Fassbinder, directed by Jean-Louis Hourdin
- 1985 : Grand-père by Remo Forlani, directed by Michel Fagadau : the grandson
- 1985-86 : La Tragédie de Macbeth by William Shakespeare, directed by Jean-Pierre Vincent : the young Macduff

=== Opera ===
- 1983 : Let's Make an Opera (Le Petit Ramoneur), by Benjamin Britten
- 1983 : Le Garçon qui a grandi trop vite, by Gian Carlo Menotti

== Awards and honors ==
- 2013 : composer of the year - Victoires de la musique classique.
- 2016 : Grand prix lycéen des compositeurs.
- 2017 : Grand Prix de la musique symphonique de la SACEM.
- 2018 : composer of the year - Victoires de la musique classique.
- 2019 : Prix Pelléas with Jacques Perry-Salkow for Anagrammes à quatre mains, Actes Sud.

Beffa received the Bene Merito honorary badge from Poland in 2013. In France, he was named an Officier des Arts et des Lettres in 2015, then Commandeur in 2021, and Chevalier in the Legion of Honour in 2022.

He held the prestigious Chair of Artistic Creation at the College de France (2012-2013)
