= Guillaume Latour =

French violinist

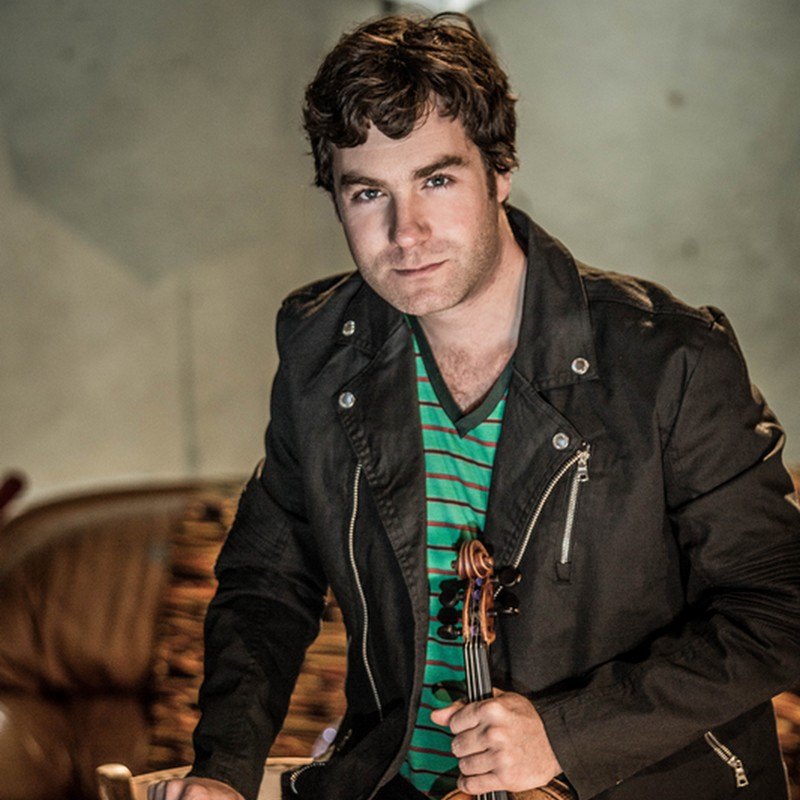
Guillaume Latour

Guillaume Latour (born 15 March 1981) is a French violinist. He plays on a violin by Jean-Baptiste Vuillaume dated 1830.

== Life ==
Born in Les Lilas, Latour began studying the violin at the age of 7. He first studied at the Bayonne music school, then at the Conservatoire de Bordeaux with Micheline Lefebvre. In 1999, he joined the Conservatoire de Paris in Olivier Charlier's class. He also studied musical analysis, composition and conducting.

Between 2006 and 2012, he held the position of concertmaster at the Toulon Opera and then became a member of the Diotima Quartet. During this same period his international career accelerated and he performed in about a hundred concerts per year throughout Europe, in the United States, in Asia, South America and North Africa.

His collaborations with current composers are numerous. He premieres pieces and collaborates with Gérard Pesson Alberto Posadas, Helmut Lachenmann, Pierre Boulez, Brian Ferneyhough, Georg Friedrich Haas.

In 2014, he decided to leave the Diotima Quartet to devote himself to personal artistic projects and his career as a soloist and chamber musician.

Latour performed as soloist or chamber musician in the most prestigious venues: Berliner Philharmonie, Suntory Hall in Tokyo, Forbidden City Hall in Beijing, Wigmore Hall in London, Teatro Nacional de Madrid, Teatro Colón in Buenos Aires, Library of Congress in Washington, Philharmonie de Paris.

In 2017, after years of collaboration, concerts and tours, he created the VV duo with the cellist and drummer Pierre-François Dufour, a.k.a. Titi.

== Discography ==
- 2013: Schubert, quintette à 2 violoncelles - Diotima Quartet, Anne Gastinel (Naïve Records)
- 2014: Paris (title: La Parisienne) - Zaz (Play On (label))
- 2015: Livre pour quatuor revisé – Pierre Boulez, Diotima Quartet (Megadisc)
- 2016: A Présent - Vincent Delerm (Tôt ou tard)
- 2016: Box 5 CDs: Schönberg / Berg / Webern – Diotima Quartet (Naïve Records)
- 2016: Autour de Chet (Title: My Funny Valentine) (Verve Records)

=== Film music ===
- 2016: Up for Love – Title Freed from desire
- 2017: Maryline – Title Cette blessure (Universal Music Group)

== Prizes and awards ==
=== Discographic awards ===
- Choc Classica 2015 for the record Livre pour quatuor revisé – Pierre Boulez, Diotima Quartet (2015, Megadisc)
- "ffff" Télérama for the record Livre pour quatuor revisé – Pierre Boulez, Diotima Quartet (2015, Megadisc)
- Coup de cœur of the Académie Charles-Cros for the disk Livre quatuor revisé – Pierre Boulez, Diotima Quartet (2015, Megadisc)

=== International competitions ===
==== As soloist ====
- First prize in the international competition of Morocco
- First prize in the competition for young violinists Radio France "Royaume de la Musique"

==== In duo/trio ====
- Prix ProMusicis (with pianist Célimène Daudet)
- Second prize in the Charles Hennin International Competition (in trio with Pierre-François Dufour and Véronique Goudin)
- First prize in the international Pianello Val Tidone competition (in trio with Pierre-François Dufour and Véronique Goudin)
