= Romain Leleu =

French classical trumpeter (born 1983)

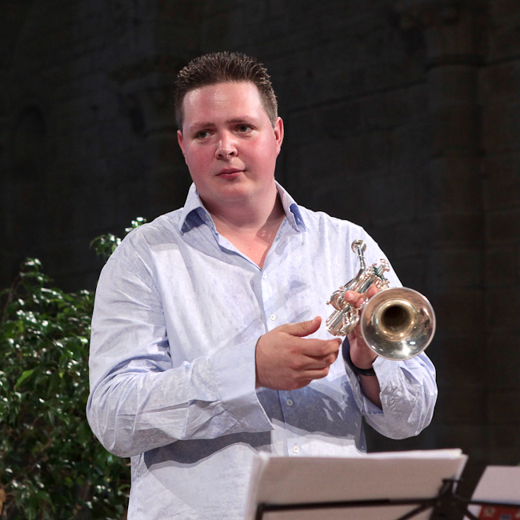
Romain Leleu in 2011

Romain Leleu (born 7 November 1983) is a French classical trumpeter. He is the elder brother of tuba player Thomas Leleu.

== Life ==
Born in Lille, Leleu was elected révélation soliste instrumental by the Victoires de la Musique Classique in 2009.

Trained by Éric Aubier, he entered the Conservatoire de Paris at age 15, and received in 2003 a First Prize for trumpet with "very good" mention, followed by the Chamber Music prize, unanimously.

He then improved his skills with Reinhold Friedrich at the Hochschule für Musik Karlsruhe.

With a wide repertoire, from Baroque Concertos to the creation of new works, he performs as a soloist in France and abroad, with notably the Orchestre National de Lille, the Orchestre national de Lorraine, the Orchestre d’Auvergne, the Orchestre de Picardie, the Orchestre symphonique de Bretagne, the Orchestre symphonique et lyrique de Nancy, the Orchestre de chambre de Paris, the Orchestre Régional de Cannes, the French Republican Guard Band, the Dresdner Kapellsolisten, the Orchestra Ensemble Kanazawa, the Orquesta Sinfonica de Mineria - Mexico...

Leleu is a regular guest at French and international festivals: Festival de La Roque-d'Anthéron, Festival international de musique de Colmar, Festival de la Vézère, Festival de Radio France et Montpellier, Flâneries musicales de Reims, Folle Journée de Nantes, etc.

Many contemporary creators call on him, as do Martín Matalon (premiere of Trame XII for trumpet and orchestra), Philippe Hersant (Création de Folk Tunes for solo trumpet), Karol Beffa (premiere of the Concerto for trumpet and orchestra, Subway for trumpet and piano and Buenos Aires for brass quintet)…

In chamber music, Romain Leleu performs regularly with Thierry Escaich, Olivier Vernet, Ghislain Leroy, Laurent Lefèvre, Igor Tchetuev, the Convergences ensemble, the Kheops Ensemble…

Leleu has been nominated "classic revelation" of the Société civile pour l'administration des droits des artistes et musiciens interprètes (2005), winner of the Lyon International Chamber Music Competition (2005), of the International competition "Lieksa Brass Week" in Finland, of the Groupe Banque Populaire (2009) foundation, of the SAFRAN for music foundation (2010), and of the Del Duca foundation prize of the Académie des Beaux Arts (2011).

Leleu regularly leads master classes in France as well as abroad (Académie Internationale de Courchevel, Seoul National University, Tokyo College of Music, Orquesta Sinfónica de Minería - Mexico, University of Cincinnati – College-Conservatory of Music - USA, Tbilissi Conservatory of music - Georgia…).

Leleu is a laureate of the Del Duca foundation of the Académie des Beaux Arts. He is also a Chevalier de l'ordre des Arts et des Lettres, January 2016 class.

Leleu has been teaching trumpet at the Conservatoire National Supérieur de Musique de Lyon since 2018.

== Discography ==
- Trumpet concertos (Aparté/Harmonia Mundi) (2015), works by Jolivet, Delerue, Beffa, Robin, Matalon, with the Orchestre d'Auvergne
- Sur la route (Aparté/Harmonia Mundi), works by Bartók, Piazzolla, Tchaikovsky, Bellini, Michel Legrand, Nino Rota... with the Convergences Ensemble (April 2013 (AP052)
- Trumpet concertos (Aparté/Harmonia Mundi), Concertos by Haydn, Hummel, Neruda. Baltic Chamber Orchestra - Emmanuel Leducq-Barôme.

Cadences by Stockhausen and Penderecki.

- Famous trumpet sonatas: Romain Leleu/Julien Le Pape, works by Brandt, Enescu, Raymond Gallois-Montbrun, Beffa, Escaich... (Indésens/codaex)
- Slavonic Spirit: Romain Leleu/Julien Le Pape, works by Bohme, Glazunov, Rachmaninov, Arutunian, Rimsky-Korsakov... (2010) (Aparté/Harmonia Mundi)
- Les Vents français (Compilation Sony)
