= Michel Bourdoncle =

French pianist and music educator

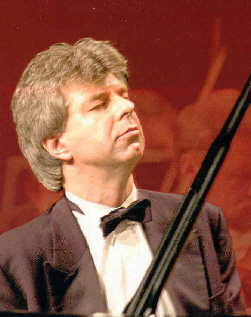
Michel Bourdoncle

Michel Bourdoncle (born 18 October 1960) is a French classical pianist and music educator.

== Career ==
Born in Marseille, after studying at the Conservatoire Darius Milhaud of Aix-en-Provence with Jacqueline Courtin and Bernard Flavigny, Bourdoncle entered the Conservatoire de Paris at the age of 14, in the classes of Geneviève Joy, Jean Hubeau, Christian Ivaldi, and Dominique Merlet.

In France, he also works with Carlos Roqué Alsina, Alberto Neuman, Yevgeny Malinin.

In 1984, he won the Grand Prize in the Acanthes International Piano Competition presided over by Iannis Xenakis.

In 1986, a scholarship allowed him to study at the Moscow Conservatory where he was advised by Henriette Mirvis, Samvil Alumian, Mikhail Voskresensky, and Lev Naumov.

That same year he was laureate of the 1st International Franz Liszt Piano Competition in Utrecht.

Bourdoncle leads an active career as a concert performer who regularly plays on the world's greatest stages: Carnegie Hall of New York, Sala São Paulo, Theatro Municipal (Rio de Janeiro), Great Hall of the Tchaikovsky Conservatory of Moscow, Anichkov Palace of St Petersburg, Philharmonic of Kazan, Sala Verdi in Milan, Weinbrenner Saal in Baden-Baden, Teatro Real of Madrid, Salle Gaveau and Théâtre du Châtelet in Paris, Théâtre Toursky of Marseille, Corum of Montpellier, Salle Paderewsky in Lausanne, Grande salle du Royal Conservatory of Brussels, Festival de Ljubljana, Philharmony of Odessa, Philharmony of Chișinău, Bucharest Radio, Philharmonies of Cluj-Napoca, Iași, Timișoara, Craiova and Bacău, Smetana Hall in Prague, Suntory Hall of Tokyo, Poly Theatre of Beijing, Grand Theatre of Shanghai, Mahidol University of Bangkok, Hanoi Opera House...

Bourdoncle has played with Geneviève Joy, Luba Timofeveyeva, Sa Chen, Alexandra Lescure, Cristina Anghelescu, Marianne Piketty, Cécile Perrin, Erick Friedman, Florin Ionescu-Galati, Pierre Hommage, Francis Duroy, Yves Desmons, Olivier Charlier, Mark Peskanov, Claudio Cruz, Yuri Bashmet and the soloists of Moscou, Kirill Rodin, Stephen Kates, Dominique de Williencourt, Frédéric Lagarde, Dominique Vidal, Philippe Cuper, Giampiero Sobrino, Jean-Marc Boissière, Amaury Wallez, Dang Thai Son, Konstantin Lifschitz, Jacques Rouvier, Georges Pludermacher. He has also played with the following quartets: Via Nova, Manfred, Élysée, Johannes, Transilvanien, Camerata de Varsovie, Archimède, Amazonien, Debussy...

He is the dedicatee of works by composers such as Carlos Roqué Alsina, Nicolas Bacri, Tristan-Patrice Challulau ... He records for the Doron Music, Ems Master Sound, Naxos Marco Polo, 3D Classics labels.

Accompanist at the Conservatoire de Paris from 1981 to 1991, Bourdoncle taught piano at the Conservatoire national supérieur musique et danse de Lyon and chamber music at the Conservatoire à rayonnement régional de Marseille.

Since 1987, he has been a piano teacher at the Darius Milhaud Conservatory in Aix-en-Provence.

He has given master classes in many countries and has participated in radio and television broadcasts.

He is the founder and artistic director of the Festival, the Academy and the International Piano Nights Competition.
