= Helena Winkelman =

Swiss composer

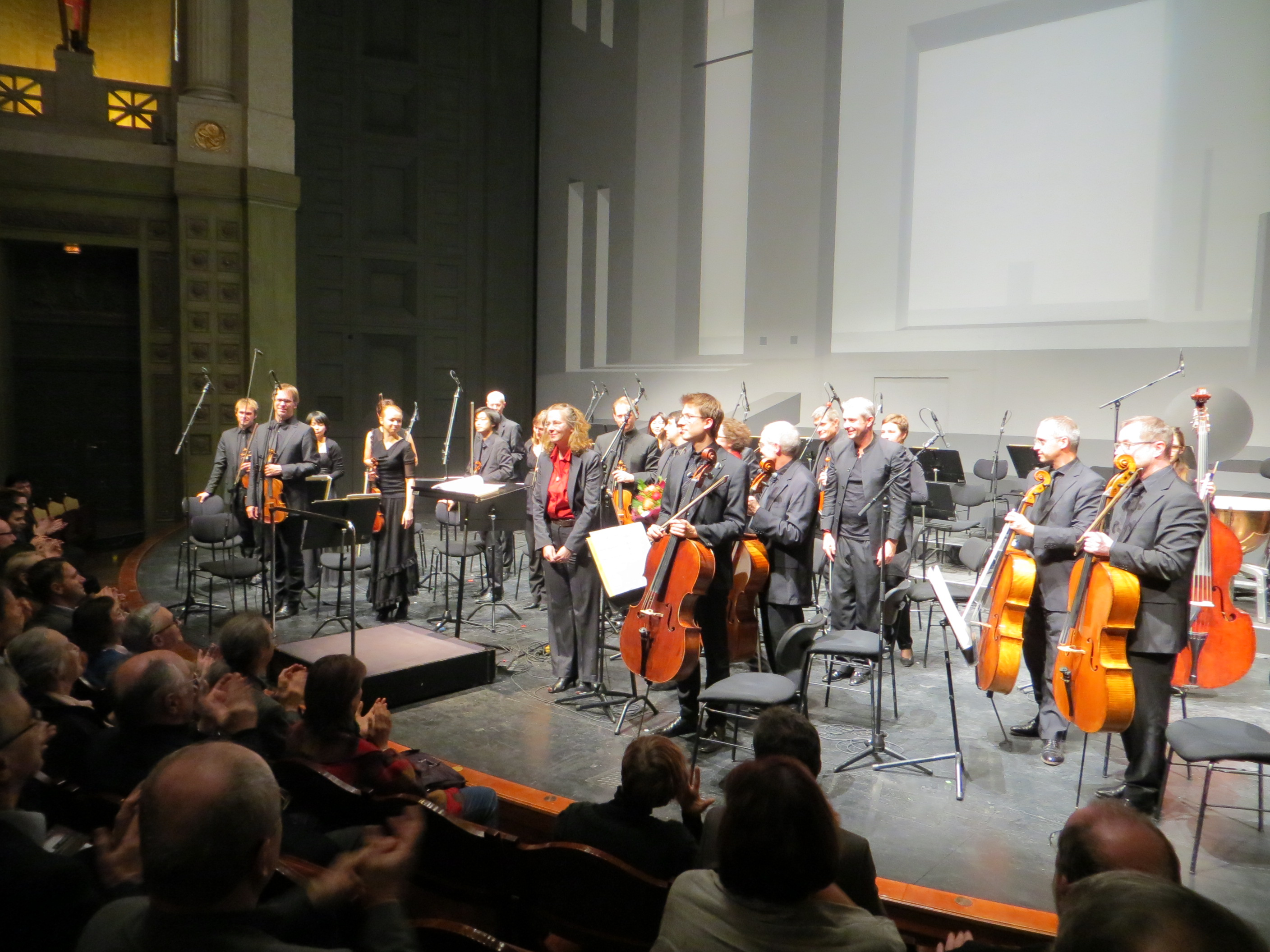

Helena Winkelman (born 27 February 1974) is a Swiss-Dutch composer and violinist. She has won the Andrea Postaccini Italian violin competition and the Walther Bringolf Award for Chamber Music of the Music Academy of Heidelberg-Mannheim. The violin she uses was made by Francesco Rugeri in 1687.
