= Thomas Leleu =

French tuba player (born 1987)

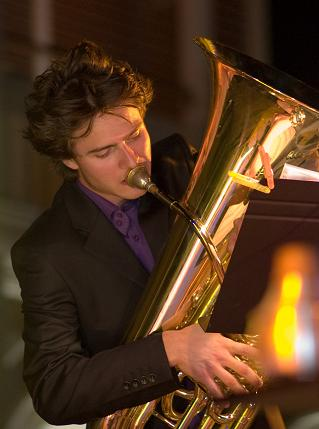
- Thomas Leleu

Background information
- Born: Thomas Leleu; 13 August 1987 (age 39); Lille, France
- Genre: Classical music
- Occupation: Tubist
- Instrument: Tuba
- Website: www.thomasleleu.com

Thomas Leleu (born August 1987) is a French tuba player. He was born in Lille, France. He is the first tuba player to have ever won the award "Revelation Instrumental Soloist of the Year" at the annual French classical music award event, the Victoires de la musique classique. At only 28 years of age, Thomas Leleu was already considered as "the young world star of the tuba". He is the younger brother of French trumpet player Romain Leleu.

== Biography ==
Thomas Leleu was born in Lille in August 1987 into a family of musicians.

== Early career ==
Thomas Leleu started to play the tuba with his father and later studied with François Thuillier and Philippe Legris. He joined the Conservatoire de Paris (the CNSM, Higher National Conservatory of Music and Dance in Paris) at age 17, having won the first prize of the open competition, and joined the tuba class of Gérard Buquet and Bernard Neuranter and the chamber music class of Jens Mc Manama. After a three-year training course he obtained the first prize for tuba and a degree awarded with distinctions. Thomas Leleu earned awards in several competitions throughout the world such as in Markneukirchen - Germany, Jeju City - South Korea, and Luxembourg.

== Classical career ==
He has been principal tubist with the Opera de Marseille since he turned 19. Thomas Leleu gives soloist concerts and master classes all around the world (France, Argentina, Venezuela, Belgium, Spain, Italy, Brazil, Austria, China, South Korea, Japan, Hungary...) and plays solo parts with various orchestras (Orchestre National d’Île-de-France, Orchestre Philharmonique de Marseille, Orchestre d’Avignon Provence OLRAP, Orchestre Symphonique de Lara – Venezuela-, Orchestre Symphonique de Santa Fe - Argentine -, Orchestre Symphonique de Jeju – Corée de Sud –, Orchester des Theaters Plauen-Zwickau (Germany), Orchestre de la Police Nationale...).

In March 2013, Thomas created the Fables of Tuba composed by Richard Galliano and in May 2015 he created the concerto for tuba and piano by the famous composer Vladimir Cosma.

Thomas is also Ambassador of Buffet Crampon and a Meinl-Weston Artist since 2011. He has contributed with the German firm to the creation of his own tuba : the 2250TL French Touch, which he has been playing since 2011.

== Discography ==
- In the Mood for Tuba
- Stories
- Born to Groove
- Outsider
- On Tour
- Virtuosi
