= Musicalta =

Musicalta Festival / Academy
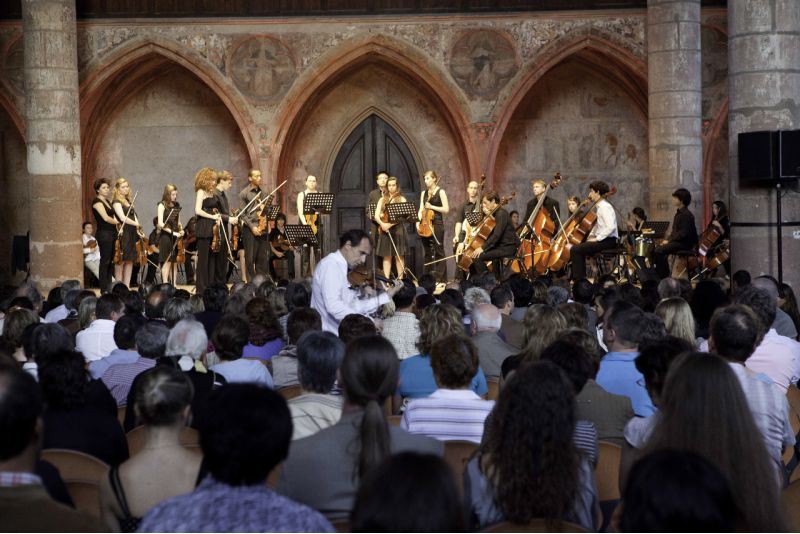
- Concert of Gilles Apap and student's orchestra, Musicalta Academy in 2010
- Genre: Classical music
- Dates: mid–July / mid–August
- Locations: Alsace-Rouffach, France
- Years active: 1996–present
- Founders: Francis Duroy - Florence Lab
- Website: official website

Musicalta is a classical music festival and school, founded in 1996 in Lapoutroie, France. Musicalta takes place every year between 15 July and 15 August, in Rouffach, France.

Musicalta also organizes concerts out of Alsace such as Maxim Vengerov's recital at Théâtre des Champs-Elysées in Paris, on 23 February 2013, and further announces concerts on 15 March 2014 in Paris and 16 April 2014 in Lyon.

== History ==
The first concert was played in 1994 in Lapoutroie, Alsace in the Vosges mountains, followed soon thereafter by concerts organized in Labaroche and Trois-Epis.

In 1995, the Festival organised five additional concerts thanks to its first budget of 14,000 FR. In 1996, the brand “MUSICALTA” was formed.

In 2001, Musicalta moved to the Alsace plain, in the Pays de Rouffach, Vignobles et Châteaux. Musicalta Festival adapted its capacities to welcome spectators and students in a natural and architectural environment, on the Wine Road.

== Festival ==
In 2012, 8,000 spectators attended the Musicalta festival. It currently takes place in towns of Pays de Rouffach, Vignobles et Châteaux. A Festival concert is also given each year in the Dominican monastery of Guebwiller.

The artistic director, Francis Duroy, offers a broad program of a repertoire that crosses several centuries of music. In Musicalta, musical works of the 18th century and contemporary creations, today's music and electro acoustic music are played together in concerts. The Musicalta presents lesser-known composers too, such as in 2000, the tribute for Charles Koechlin and in 2002, the tribute for Guillaume Lekeu.

=== Invited artists ===
From the start, in Trois-Epis, in Labaroche and then in Rouffach, the Festival has hosted formations such as the Fine Arts Quartet, Gilles Apap, Philippe Bernold, Augustin Dumay, and Jean-Philippe Collard.

== Academy ==
The first music academy took place in 1994 and one year later the chamber music class opened. Musicalta Academy was officially founded in 1996, welcoming about 20 students. Students partake in a range of activities, including an instrumental workshops, string ensemble training, and lectures. Musicalta Academy also offers complementary workshops such as chamber music.
