= Edgar Moreau =

French classical cellist (born 1994)

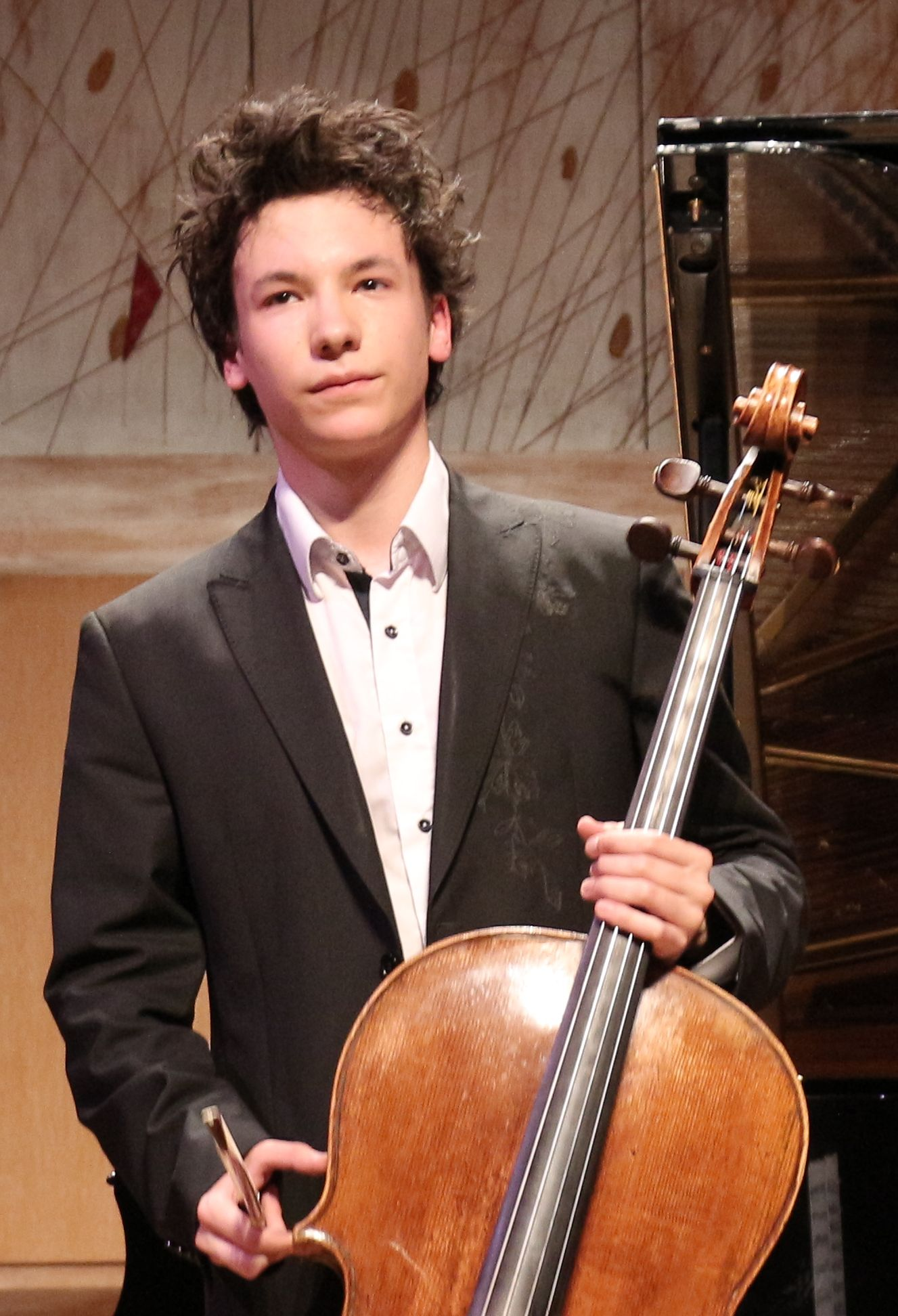
Edgar Moreau at the Cité de la musique.

Edgar Moreau (born 3 April 1994) is a French classical cellist.

== Biography ==
Moreau was born in Paris on 3 April 1994. He began studying the cello at age four with Carlos Beyris as well as the piano, the instrument for which he obtained his First Prize at the Conservatoire à rayonnement régional de Boulogne-Billancourt in 2010. After following the teaching of Xavier Gagnepain, he continued his studies at the Conservatoire de Paris in the class of Philippe Muller in cello and Claire Désert for chamber music.

At the age of 15, he won the Young Soloist Prize at the Concours de violoncelle Rostropovitch and at 17, the second prize of the International Tchaikovsky Competition. In 2013 he signed an exclusive contract with Erato, and his first recording, a recital of pieces for cello and piano with Pierre-Yves Hodique, was published in 2014. Révélation soliste instrumental de l'année at the Victoires de la musique classique 2013, he was Soliste instrumental de l'année at the 2015 edition. From 2015 to 2018, Edgar Moreau was an artist of the "Junge Wilde" concerts at the Konzerthaus Dortmund.

On 27 November 2015, he played the sarabande of the 2nd suite by Johann Sebastian Bach during the ceremony held at Les Invalides in tribute to the victims of the November 2015 Paris attacks.

Moreau plays a David Tecchler cello dated 1711. The instrument was a gift from his late father.

== Discography ==
- Pieces for cello and piano by Elgar, Paganini, Fauré, Dvorák, Poulenc, Tchaikovsky, Massenet, Popper, Gluck... - with Pierre-Yves Hodique. Erato, 2014
- Le Roi qui n'aimait pas la musique by Karol Beffa, with Renaud Capuçon (violin), Paul Meyer (clarinet) and Karol Beffa (piano), CD-book Gallimard jeunesse, 2017
- A Family Affair (music by Dvořák and Korngold) with siblings Raphäelle and David (violins), and Jérémie (piano), 2020
