= Nicolas Vérin =

French composer

- Born: June 21, 1958 (age 68); Saint-Omer, Pas-de-Calais, France
- Occupation: Classical composer
- Years active: 1981–present
- Website: www.nicolasverin.com

Nicolas Vérin (born 21 June 1958) is a French composer and professor of music. His many influences, from jazz to electronics, from American to French music, give him an unusual style, apart from the main trends of French contemporary music, combining energy and subtleness.

While rooted in electroacoustic music and its approach based on composing with sounds rather than notes, he also wrote many instrumental pieces and specialized particularly in music mixing live performers and electronics, whether fixed sound or live processing. At the basis of his work are the musical gesture and the life of sound and its morphology. An improviser himself, his works often leave a creative space for performers, and he has collaborated on many occasions with famous improvisers.

Vérin received commissions from the French Ministry of Culture, Radio France, INA-GRM, Studios, Festivals and Conservatories. He was composer in residence in the Midi-Pyrénées region and was awarded the prize Villa Médicis hors les murs. His music, published by Éditions Jobert and Éditions François Dhalmann, has been performed and broadcast worldwide.

== Life and work ==
=== Beginnings ===
Vérin was born 21 June 1958 in Saint-Omer, France. After initial studies with private professors of piano, at the Martenot School and the Brest Conservatory, he obtained his Diplôme de fin d'études from the Conservatoire National de Région de Saint-Maur in piano, studies in chamber music, harmony. At age 12 he started guitar and a year later founds and leads a pop music group. This was to be followed by jazz piano, which he learned mostly on his own, but also with teachers (Matias Pizarro, Jimmy Cheatham, François Couturier).

After his baccalauréat, he followed a summer workshop in Cordes, near Toulouse, by INA-GRM, during which he decided to become an electroacoustic composer. He then studied music and science at the Universities of Paris VI–Jussieu, Brest and Paris VIII–Vincennes, where he obtained a licence de musique (B.A.). During this time, he organized with a fellow student the first electroacoustic music concert in the city of Brest. He later attended musical academies Acanthes (Aix-en-Provence 1982), and Darmstädter Ferienkurse (1992).

Thereafter, he entered the electroacoustic music composition class of Pierre Schaeffer and Guy Reibel at Paris Conservatory where he got his degree in 1979. Vérin went on to study 5 years at the University of California, San Diego, where he obtained a Master of Arts (1982) and a PhD (1986) in composition and computer music. His main professors there were Roger Reynolds, Jean-Charles François, Joji Yuasa, Robert Erickson, F. Richard Moore, Bernard Rands, Gordon Mumma, Julio Estrada.

=== Main career ===
Upon returning to France, Vérin collaborated as musical assistant with Pierre Henry, for studio work, recording original sounds, processing sounds, and concert performances in major Festivals in France and Germany. The pioneer of musique concrète invited him in his studio for a composition in 1988. Vérin is considered one of only two disciples of Pierre Henry. and has performed his music in many occasions.

In 1988, he was chosen by Jean-Claude Éloy to work at CIAMI (Centre d'informatique appliquée à la musique et l'image, Rueil-Malmaison) in charge of the MIDI studio and the cmusic/CARL environment.

In 1989 he joined the creation department at IRCAM, where he works as a tutor. This involved coordinating the productions of invited composers (Michael Jarrell, Michaël Levinas, Frédéric Durieux, Hans-Peter Kunz) and teaching several courses of computer music (for the doctorate program of École des Hautes Études en Sciences Sociales and IRCAM's Computer Music Curriculum) as well as participating in the beta-testing of Miller Puckette's Max programming language.

In 1990, Vérin founded the association Ligys, which becomes a studio coop with composers Christine Groult and Jacqueline Ozanne, active in Paris for productions and a few concerts. After the dissolution of Ligys, he founds in 2007 the association Impulsion.

In 1992 Vérin was appointed Professor of Electroacoustic music at the Conservatoire National de Région of Chalon sur Sâone (Burgundy), where he is tenured in 1998. From 2002 to the present, he is Professor of Composition and Electroacoustic Music at École nationale de musique et de danse d'Evry (Essonne).

From 1992 to 1995, he is composer-in-residence in the Midi-Pyrénées Region. This includes a residence at LIMCA (Lutherie Informatique et Musique Contemporaine à Auch), where he realizes two compositions. He is appointed musical director for two editions of the Auch Danse/Musique Contemporaines Festival (in Gascony), involving the programming of 8 concerts, some in relation to dance companies. The residence also included studio work at GMEA (Groupe de Musique Electroacoustique d'Albi-Tarn), resulting in an electronic music piece, In vino musica, given daily for the show Musique des Vignes from October through November 1992 at the Centre Culturel de l'Albigeois.

In 2003–2004, Vérin is invited at IRCAM to do a new version of his work 11 avenue du Midi on the WFS system (sonic holography), installation presented at Nicéphore Days in Chalon 2004 (France), at IRCAM's Festival Résonance 2004 and in Leipzig in 2005.

=== As performer ===
Besides his compositional work, Vérin has also performed electronic music and improvisation. He founded Duo Alchemia with Julien Feltrin (recorder), touring in France. With the improvised music trio DSV (Cécile Daroux: flutes, Louis Sclavis: clarinets, Nicolas Vérin: electronics) he performed in France (Festival Agora in 2002), in Russia and United States. Since the untimely death of Cécile Daroux, the group remains as a duo and renamed itself Ensemble Cécile. He performed with Vinko Globokar as electronic musician in the latter's magnum opus Laboratorium, in concerts at UC San Diego, Witten, and Cologne.

Vérin appears also as improviser or electronic musician in several CDs (Xe symphonie by Pierre Henry, Préfixes by Michaël Levinas, Congruences by Michael Jarrell, Improvisations préparées with Mirtha Pozzi and Pablo Cueco) and performed with saxophonist Daniel Kientzy, actor Jean-Louis Jacopin, flutist James Newton, saxophonist Steve Coleman, pianist Anne-Marie Fijal. He has performed the electronic part of mixed and acousmatic pieces by Pierre Henry and many others. As a pianist, Vérin was accompanist of choirs and singers, played in jazz groups (with François Moutin and Louis Moutin, Philippe Botta and others).

== Awards ==
=== Prizes ===
- Villa Medicis Hors les Murs (Institut Français, CulturesFrance, 2001 and 2010)
- Concours Luc Ferrari – Hörspiel 2, by La Muse en circuit and Radio France (1997)
- CEDS (New London, Connecticut, 1991)
- selections in many competitions including Sond'Arte (Lisbon 2009), Bourges (1998, 1997, 1996, 1994, 1990), Olympia (Athens, 1989), Leonie D. Rothschild (USA), etc.

=== Commissions ===
- French Ministry of Culture (1992, 1994, 1997, 1999, 2003)
- INA-GRM (1989, 1993, 2004, 2009)
- Radio France (1991, 1996, 2004, 2012)
- Festivals (Dijon in 1996 and 2001, Perpignan 1995, Nancy 1999)
- Studios (Césaré Reims 2012, Centre Henri Pousseur (CRFMW) Liège 2009, GMEA 1991, GMVL 1990)
- Conservatories (Bagnolet 2007, CEFEDEM Dijon 2006, Evry 2003...)

== Works ==
Vérin's catalog consists of more than 60 works, ranging from solo instrument to symphonic orchestra, through electronic music (fixed sounds or live), stage music for theatre, dance. Several of his pieces are published by Éditions Jobert-Lemoine (Paris) and Éditions François Dhalmann (Strasbourg).

=== Main compositions ===
- Opus 4 Solo violin piece I (7' – 1981)
- Opus 7 Pleine Lune (26' – 1982) for electronics (four tracks) and projected images (by Dominique Piollet and Nicolas Vérin).
- Opus 8 Solo violin piece II (6' – 1983)
- Opus 10c Solo III (7' – 1998)
- Opus 12 Petites variations pour piano (10' – 1985–2004)
- Opus 13 Une nouvelle demeure pour Picasso (20', 1985) music for the documentary film by Edmond Agabra
- Opus 14 Cirios (12' – 1986) for 14 instruments (picc, fl, cl/b. cl. b, t. sax, trpt, 2 trb, el. guit, synth, perc, vn, viola, vc. and cb.)
- Opus 15 La lueur et la fumée (1 hour – 1986–1993) Musical theatre for actor, synthesizer and 10 tracks to be mixed live on texts adapted from Charles Baudelaire's Le Spleen de Paris
- Opus 16 Suite pour Minnie (18' – 1986) for wind ensemble (20 musicians)
- Opus 17 Retornelo (8' – 1987) for wind quintet
- Opus 18 Ombres chinoises (18' – 1988) for non-professional instrumental ensemble (2/2/0/0 1/0/0 4/4/3/2/1 or more)
- Opus 19 Miroirs Déformants (11') for oboe and electronics (four tracks)
- Opus 20 Péripéties (14'30 – 1989 – rev. 1995) for four flutes
- Opus 21 Tulipes aquatiques (5' – 1990) music for the art film by Unglee
- Opus 22 Rhapsodie parisienne (28' – 1990) radiophonic piece (two-track tape) with Jean Dautremay, voice, Jean Pierlot, percussion, Nicolas Vérin, synthesizer.
- Opus 23 Projections obliques (23' – 1990–1991) for solo flute and clarinet, live electronics and ensemble (Midi keyboard, tpt, trb, perc., vn, cb)
- Opus 24 Métalmorphose (16' – 1990) for percussion and electronics
- Opus 25b De très près ou de très loin... (9'45 – 2001) for fixed sounds
- Opus 26a Chassé-croisé Ia (8' – 1991) for clarinet (+ bass cl.) and viola + adaptations Ib for clarinet (+ bass cl.) and cello and Ic for clarinet (+ basset horn) and viola
- Opus 27 In vino musica (19' – 1992) electronics (six tracks) with optional wine-tasting installation
- Opus 29 Instabile (17' – 1992, rev. 1996) for ensemble (fl, oboe, cl/b. clar, F horn, 2 perc., pno/el. kbd., vn, vc) and live electronics
- Opus 32a Di un temporale... (22' – 1994) for orchestra (2 fl (+ picc + alto fl), 2 oboe (+ E.H.), 2 cl (+ b. cl.), 1 bn, 1 cbn, 2 F. H., 2 tpt, 1 tbn, 1 tuba, 2 perc, 1 hrp, strings (min. 6/6/4/4/3) and electronics
- Opus 32b Temporale che non c'è (17'30) for orchestra (2 fl (+ picc + alto fl), 2 oboe (+ E.H.), 2 cl (+ b. cl.), 1 bn, 1 cbn, 2 F. H., 2 tpt, 1 tbn, 1 tuba, 2 perc, 1 hrp, strings (min. 8/6/4/4/3)
- Opus 33 Suite en mouvement (12' – 1995) 3 pieces for clarinets and electronics, for students 1st to 3rd cycle
- Opus 34 11, avenue du Midi (13' – 1995) radiophonic piece
- Opus 35 una rosa... una rueda... (23' – 1995) for speaker, ensemble (fl, 2 cl, sax, tpt, tb, perc) and electronics, on Federico Garcia Lorca's poem "Oda a Salvador Dali"
- Opus 36a Mariposa clavada que medita su vuelo (17' – 1996) for flute and electronics (four tracks)
- Opus 36b Thyrcis (9'50 – 2002) for solo flute
- Opus 38 Chassé-croisé II (8' – 1997) for violin and piano
- Opus 39a Khamsin (20' – 1997) for drum kit and electronics
- Opus 39b Samoûm (17' – 1997) electronics
- Opus 40 Chassé-croisé III (8' – 1998) for two violins
- Opus 42 Bora (19' – 1999) for saxophone (soprano and barytone) and electronics
- Opus 44 Chinook (18' −1999) for electric guitar and electronics
- Opus 45 P'hioni (20' – 2000) for contrabass and electronics
- Opus 47 Solid Noid (25' – 1992–2005) for Midi piano, Disklavier and live electronics
- Opus 48 Vents du Monde (28' – 1999–2003) for saxophone, electric guitar, contrabass, drums and live electronics
- Opus 49 Parties diverses (15' – 2002–2004) concerto for Ondes Martenot and orchestra (strings + 2 horns)
- Opus 50 Chassé-croisé IV (10' – 2004) for flute and percussion (vibraphone and 6 gongs)
- Opus 51 Interleaved tracks (15' – 2004) for bass clarinet and live electronics
- Opus 52 Jardín de acero (26' – 2007) for soprano, clarinet (also Eb and bass), percussion, piano, violin and cello
- Opus 53 Impulsions (15' – 2008) 3 pedagogical pieces for strings and electronics, for students 1st to 3rd cycle
- Opus 54 Trois études d'espace (19'30 – 2009) electronics (eight tracks)
- Opus 55 Now and Then and Now (10'20 – 2012) for recorder flute (Paetzold contrabass, tenor and soprano) and live electronics
- Opus 56 Étoile filante (2' – 2011) for Bb clarinet, written in memory of Cécile Daroux
- Opus 57 HystéRAProtéron (3'36 – 2012) for contrabass clarinet and electronics

=== Recordings ===
- Solo IV. OuSonMuPo – Disque Premier. Art3mix 0101. CD. 2011.
- Miroirs déformants, Métalmorphose, Mariposa clavada que medita su vuelo, P'hioni. Nicolas Vérin – Four works for soloists and electronics. INA-GRM 475122. CD. 2005.
- Solo Violin Piece II, Espejito, Chassé-Croisé Ic, Petites Variations pour Piano, Thyrcis, Chassé-Croisé II, Péripéties. Chassés-croisés, Duos and solos by Nicolas Vérin. NVCD01. CD. 2003. re-issued on cdbaby
- Chassé-croisé III. Contemporary Violin duets, by János Négyesy and Païvikki Nykter. AuCourant Records 0010-1. CD. 2000.
- Oui. Arrêts fréquents. Vandœuvre 9813. CD. 1998.
- Solo III. Paysaginaire Concrètement. Paysaginaire PAYSA9810. CD. 1998.
- Solo Violin Piece I. Dedications to János Négyesy. Neuma 450-95. CD. 1995.
- 11, avenue du Midi. Hörspiele 2. Radio-France/La Muse en circuit. CD. 1995.
- In vino musica. Musique des vignes. GMEA MP01. CD. 1992.

=== Selected writings ===
- "Cécile Daroux : le témoignage de Nicolas Vérin". Tempo Flûte no. 7, pp. 43–45, St-Clair sur Epte, 2012.
- "Approaching contemporary music". Pulse Field, Georgia State University, Atlanta, 2003.
- "Entretien avec Pierre Henry". Ars Sonora Revue no. 9, p. 20. Paris, 1999.
- "Quelles notes de programme pour la musique d'aujourd'hui ?". Média et Information. L'Harmattan, Paris 1998.
- "Interview de Steve Reich". Ars Sonora Revue no. 7, p. 7, Paris, 1998.
- " Congruences et l'électronique". Les cahiers de l'Ircam no. 1, pp. 67–77, Paris 1992. ISBN 2-90948703-2
- "Archipelago de Roger Reynolds". Inharmoniques no. 8, pp. 178–205. IRCAM, Paris, 1991. ISBN 2-909487-00-8
- "Spatialisation: interprétation, composition, improvisation ?". Dhomont, Francis, ed. Lien, special issue "L'espace du son", pp. 53–55. Musiques et Recherches LIEN. Ohain, Belgium, 1989, reprinted in 1998
