= Emmanuel Leducq-Barôme =

French conductor

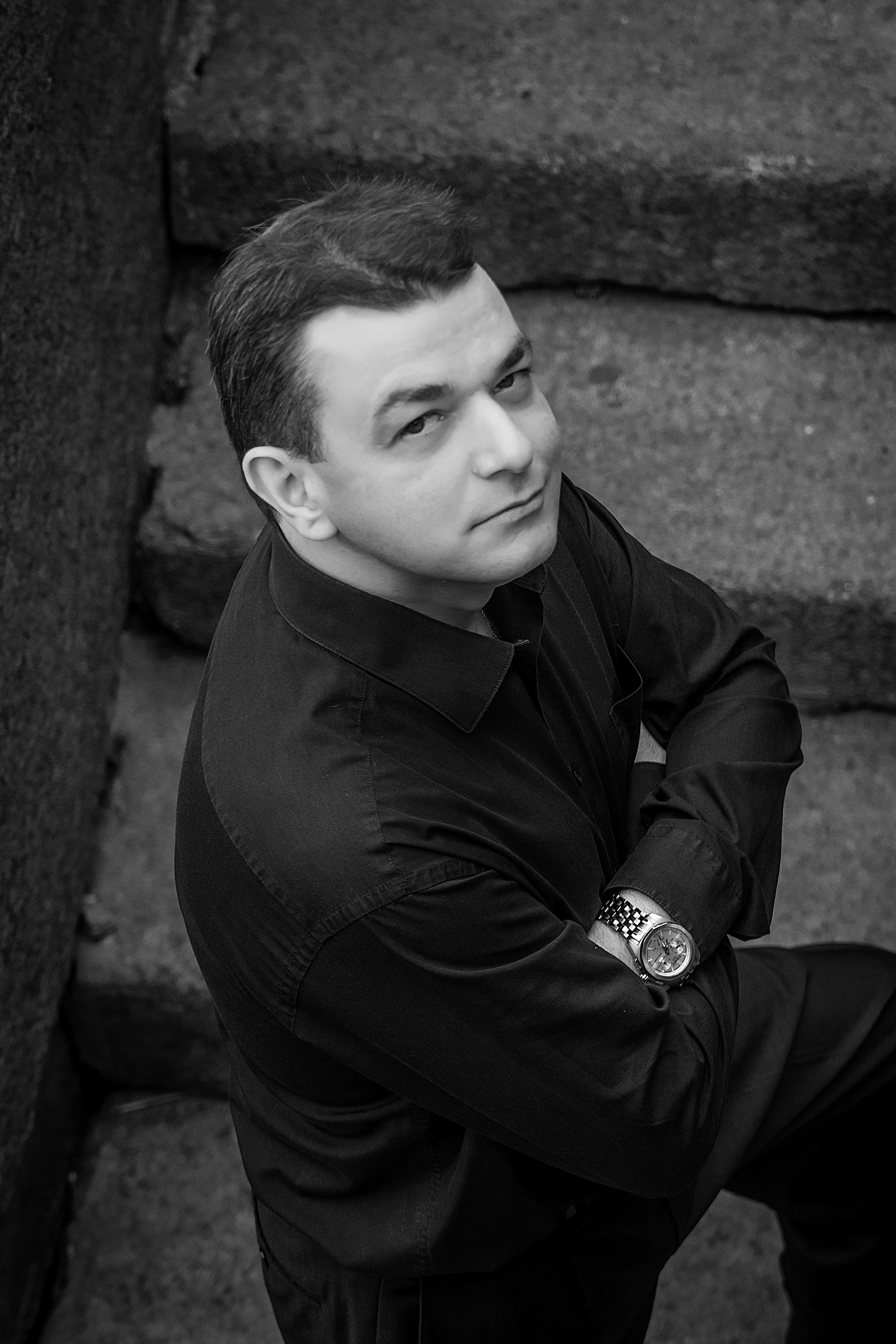
Emmanuel Leducq-Barôme

Emmanuel Leducq-Barôme (born 1971) is a French conductor.

== Life ==
Leducq-Barôme received his education first in France (Conservatoire de Lyon, Conservatoire de Paris), then in Switzerland (Conservatoire de Musique de Genève) and in Russia (Saint Petersburg Conservatory), with Ilya Musin. He practiced at the Sibelius Academy in Helsinki and at the Amsterdam Conservatory.

In 1996 Leducq-Barôme began working with orchestras in Novosibirsk, Irkutsk, Vladivostok, Ukraine, the Baltic States and France. He worked for three years as conductor of the Kaliningrad Philharmonic orchestra. He also performed as music director of the Baltic Chamber Orchestra (the chamber department of the Saint Petersburg Philharmonic Orchestra and Moscow and the Russian State Orchestra. Since January 2006 he has been a permanently invited conductor of the St. Petersburg Opera House.

Leducq-Barôme has performed at many musical summer festivals in France, where he has worked with Pierre Amoyal, Arto Noras, Gérard Poulet, Régis Pasquier, André Cazalet, Nikolai Petrov and Denis Matsuev. In 2001 he was awarded the AFFA (Association Française d'Action Artistique) prize and the Lavoisierstipendium.

Since January 2008 he has been working with the Saint Petersburg Philharmonic Orchestra.

== Discography ==
- Discography (Discogs)
- Krzysztof Penderecki: Clarinet Concerto (soloist Michel Lethiec, Saint Petersburg Philharmonic), 2001
- Dmitri Shostakovich: Piano Concerto No. 1 (soloist Yakov Kasman, Kaliningrad Philharmonic), 2002
- Alfred Schnittke: Piano Concerto No. 1 (soloist Yakov Kasman, Kaliningrad Philharmonic), 2002
- Arthur Honegger: Symphony No. 2 (Saint Petersburg Philharmonic), 2003
- Richard Strauss: Metamorphosen for 23 solo strings (Saint Petersburg Philharmonic), 2003
- Béla Bartók: Music for Strings, Percussion and Celesta, 2004
- Wolfgang Amadeus Mozart: Sinfonia Concertante for Violin, Viola and Orchestra (soloists Lew Klytschkow and Wladimir Stopitschew, Baltic Chamber Orchestra), 2005
- Ludwig van Beethoven: Violin Concerto (soloist Régis Pasquier, Baltic Chamber Orchestra), 2006
