= Philippe Foriel-Destezet =

French billionaire businessman

- Born: 1935 or 1936; Lyon, France
- Died: June 2021
- Education: HEC Paris
- Spouse: Aline Morel
- Children: 4

Philippe Foriel-Destezet (c. 1935 - June 2021) was a French billionaire businessman. He owned 18% of the Swiss-based employment agency Adecco.

== Early life ==
He graduated from HEC Paris in 1958.

== Career ==
He founded the employment agency Ecco in 1964.

With Klaus Jacobs, he was instrumental in bringing about the merger of the French agency, Ecco and the Swiss agency, Adia Interim that created Adecco in 1996. He was on the board of Adecco.

He stood down as co-chairman of Adecco in 2005, becoming honorary president in 2006.

He was cited in the Panama Papers scandal in 2016.

== Personal life ==
He was married to Aline. They lived in London, and had four children.

== See also ==
- List of billionaires
- French Rich List
