= List of musical works in unusual time signatures =

This is a list of musical compositions or pieces of music that have unusual time signatures. "Unusual" is here defined to be any time signature other than simple time signatures with top numerals of 2, 3, or 4 and bottom numerals of 2, 4, or 8, and compound time signatures with top numerals of 6, 9, or 12 and bottom numerals 4, 8, or 16.

The conventions of musical notation typically allow for more than one written representation of a particular piece. The chosen time signature largely depends upon musical context, personal taste of the composer or transcriber, and the graphic layout on the written page. Frequently, published editions were written in a specific time signature to visually signify the tempo for slow movements in symphonies, sonatas, and concerti.

A perfectly consistent unusual metrical pattern may be notated in a more familiar time signature that does not correspond to it. For example, the Passacaglia from Britten's opera Peter Grimes consists of variations over a recurring bass line eleven beats in length but is notated in ordinary 4/4 time, with each variation lasting 2 3/4 bars, and therefore commencing each time one crotchet earlier in the bar than the preceding one.

== Upper number of 1 ==
=== 1/1 ===
- Enigma Variations by Edward Elgar, in Variation VII.
- Entr'actes and Sappho Fragments by Harrison Birtwistle.
- Leopardi Fragments by Peter Maxwell Davies.
- Mixtur by Karlheinz Stockhausen.
- Pli selon pli by Pierre Boulez, in the third movement.
- Rhythmicana by Henry Cowell, for the entire first two movements.
- String Quartet No. 2 by Easley Blackwood Jr.
- Symphony No. 2 by Alexander Borodin. Movement II is in Prestissimo 1/1, except for the trio section, which is in Allegretto 6/4.

=== 1/2 ===
- Air - Homage to Sibelius by Thomas Adès.
- Appalachian Spring, by Aaron Copland, at the third bar of rehearsal 46 and the third bar of rehearsal 48.
- Apaisement, Op. 13 No. 1, by Ernest Chausson.
- Canon with Sustained Notes, No. 60 from Mikrokosmos by Béla Bartók, in one measure.
- Carmina Burana by Carl Orff, in some bars of some movements.
- Decet for wind instruments, Op. 14, by George Enescu, at bar 240 of the third movement (fifth bar before rehearsal number 42).
- Étude in C major, by Florence Price.
- Fünf Klavierstücke, Op. 23 by Arnold Schoenberg, at bar 9 of the second piece.
- 3 Gesänge aus 'Viae Inviae', Op. 23, by Anton Webern, in some parts of the second song.
- Káťa Kabanová, by Leoš Janáček, for some measures in Act III between rehearsal numbers 5 and 8.
- La Langeur, from Le follie francaise ou les dominos from Pièces de Clavecin by François Couperin.
- Mladi by Leoš Janáček, at measure 68 of the second movement.
- 8 Nocturnes, FP 56 by Francis Poulenc, at bar 27 of No. 1.
- Piano Sonata, Op. 43, by Harry Farjeon for a few bars in the first movement.
- Piano Sonata No. 3, Op. 105, by Sigfrid Karg-Elert.
- Piano Sonata No. 5, Op. 53, by Alexander Scriabin, at bars 251 to 262 (Presto giocoso).
- Pli selon pli by Pierre Boulez, in the fifth movement.
- Quartet, Op. 22, by Anton Webern, in many bars of the second movement.
- Rapsodie nègre by Francis Poulenc, for some bars in the third movement, "Honoloulou".
- String Quartet No. 1, by Béla Bartók, in bars 3, 10, and 22 of the third movement.
- Symphony No. 1, by Edward Elgar, in the second movement.
- Symphony No. 17 in G♯ minor by Nikolay Myaskovsky, in many parts of the first movement.

=== 1/4 ===
- Adagio 1972 by Kyle Gann, in measure 66.
- Alcancías by Silvestre Revueltas, in the second movement, for some bars between rehearsal marks 24 and 32.
- Carmina Burana by Carl Orff, in the movement Swaz hie gat umbe.
- Clarinet Sonata by Andrew Violette, at measure 97 of the first movement.
- Concerto for Piano and Wind Instruments by Igor Stravinsky, just before rehearsal mark 83.
- The Death of the Hired Man by Andrew Violette.
- Divided Arpeggios, No. 143 from Mikrokosmos by Béla Bartók, for one bar, but incorrectly written as 1/2.
- "Etincelles," the first movement of Suite Bizarre by Joseph Achron.
- "The Eynsham Poacher", a traditional song; in the arrangement by Dave Pegg, most of the tune is in 12/8, but the finale includes one bar of 1/4.
- Fantasy on Themes from Mozart's Figaro and Don Giovanni, S. 697, by Franz Liszt and completed by Leslie Howard. Bar 431/427 is in 1/4 time.
- Five Chromatic Dances for piano by William Albright, in one measure of the fourth dance.
- Fleurs mélodiques des Alpes, the second part of Franz Liszt's Album d'un voyageur, S. 156, in one section of the sixth piece (S. 156/13).
- Hovenweep by Kyle Gann, in bar 116.
- How Miraculous Things Happen by Kyle Gann, in bar 109.
- Hyperchromatica by Kyle Gann, in the movements Futility Row, Delta Oracle, and Galactic Jamboree.
- Iberia by Isaac Albéniz, in the movement Jerez.
- Lonely Child (1980) by Claude Vivier, at bar 56.
- Mädchentotenlieder, by Bo Nilsson, in many bars.
- Metastaseis, by Iannis Xenakis, in the first 103 bars.
- Metropolis Part 1: The Miracle and the Sleeper, by Dream Theater, at the third bar of rehearsal R.
- On an Overgrown Path, by Leoš Janáček, for some bars in the sixth, tenth, and eleventh movements.
- Petrushka by Igor Stravinsky, for the bar before rehearsal 17.
- Piano Concerto No. 2 by Sergei Prokofiev, in two measures in the second movement.
- Piano Sonata by Béla Bartók, in the third movement.
- Piano Sonata no. 2 by Roger Sessions, at measure 178.
- Piano Sonata No. 3 by Carlos Chávez, in six bars of the first movement.
- The first version of Piano Sonata No. 5 by Sergei Prokofiev, for one measure in the third movement.
- Pli selon pli by Pierre Boulez, in all movements except the fourth.
- Portraits in Rhythm and Portraits in Melody by Anthony J. Cirone, in Studies Nos. 12, 32, and 47.
- String Quartet No. 4 by Ben Johnston, in all parts except the Violin 1 part.
- Tzigane by Maurice Ravel, in four measures, the first of which is right before rehearsal 27.
- Valse à capriccio sur deux motifs de Lucia et Parisina, S. 401, written by Franz Liszt, contains a section in 1/4 time in the right hand.
- Zipangu (1980) by Claude Vivier in several measures.

=== 1/8 ===
- Alchymia by Thomas Adès has a measure of 4/4+1/8.
- Amor dammi quel fazzolettino by Andrew Violette, for one measure in the left hand of the second piano part.
- Black Tea by Andrew Violette.
- 20 Caprices and Rhythmic Studies, by Émile Jaques-Dalcroze, in No. 9.
- Caprice Variations by George Rochberg, in variation 19.
- Carmina Burana by Carl Orff, in the movement Fortune plango vulnera.
- Charon by Richard Barrett, in bars 51 and 68.
- The Death of the Hired Man by Andrew Violette.
- Fantasy by Andrew Violette.
- Last Dance by Andrew Violette.
- Lincolnshire Posy by Percy Grainger, in the fifth movement, "Lord Melbourne".
- Lonely Child (1980) by Claude Vivier, in several measures.
- Mädchentotenlieder, by Bo Nilsson, at bar 53.
- A Nightmare to Remember, by Dream Theater, in bar 31.
- On an Overgrown Path, by Leoš Janáček, for two bars in the third movement.
- Piano Sonata No. 1 by Charles Wuorinen, at bar 84 of part 1.
- Piano Sonata no. 2 by Roger Sessions, at bar 223.
- Piano Sonata No. 3 by Carlos Chávez, at bar 165 of the second movement.
- Pli selon pli by Pierre Boulez, in the first and fourth movements.
- Portraits in Rhythm and Portraits in Melody by Anthony J. Cirone, in Studies Nos. 12, 16, and 47.
- A próle do bébé, Book 2 by Heitor Villa-Lobos. The fifth piece, "O Cavalinho de páu" (The Little Wooden Horse), bar 68 is in ^{2}_{[4]}1/8 time.
- String Trio, Op. 20 by Anton Webern, in the beginning of the second movement.
- Symphony No. 3 by Arnold Bax, at rehearsal mark 3 of the first movement.

=== 1/16 ===
- Bicinium by Charles Wuorinen, at bars 49 and 82.
- Five Chromatic Dances for piano by William Albright, in the fifth dance (parenthesized).
- Five Little Pieces by Peter Maxwell Davies, in the fourth piece.
- Mädchentotenlieder, by Bo Nilsson, at bar 11.
- Piano Sonata no. 2 by Roger Sessions, at measure 257.
- Portraits in Rhythm and Portraits in Melody by Anthony J. Cirone, in Studies Nos. 45 and 47.

=== 1/32 ===
- Bicinium by Charles Wuorinen, at bars 9, 27, 56, and 69.
- Contrapunctus by Mark Andre.
- Mädchentotenlieder, by Bo Nilsson, in bar 9.
- Piano Sonata No. 1 by Charles Wuorinen, in bar 43 of part 1.

=== 1/64 ===
- "A Headache And A Sixty-Fourth", from Ron Jarzombek's album Solitarily Speaking of Theoretical Confinement, has a constant time signature pattern of 4/4 and 1/64.

== Upper number of 2 ==
=== 2/1 ===
- Káťa Kabanová, by Leoš Janáček. Act II is in 2/1 from rehearsal number 20 to just before rehearsal number 24; act III is in 2/1 for four bars before rehearsal number 27 and six bars before rehearsal number 28, followed by a mixture of 2/1 and between rehearsal numbers 28 and 29, and one bar before rehearsal number 36.
- 5 Motets by Peter Maxwell Davies.
- Partita No. 6 in E minor, BWV 830, by Johann Sebastian Bach. The last movement, a gigue, is in 2/1 in the Bischoff edition; however, the symbol (the mensuration sign for "tempus perfectum, prolatio minor, diminutum") appears in the first edition of 1731, and = 2/2 in the autograph manuscript. This time signature is unusual for gigues, which are usually in 6/8 or 12/8.
- Piano Sonata No. 3 by Sigfrid Karg-Elert, in one measure.
- Pli selon pli by Pierre Boulez, in the first and third movements.
- Russian Easter Festival Overture by Nikolai Rimsky-Korsakov, from measure 661 to the end.

=== 2/16 ===
- Bicinium by Charles Wuorinen, at bar 75.
- Comme le vent, first of the Douze études dans toutes les tons mineurs, Op. 39, by Charles-Valentin Alkan.
- Douze études pour Caisse-Claire by Jacques Delécluse, in some measures of the last piece.
- Five Little Pieces by Peter Maxwell Davies, in the fourth piece.
- Pli selon pli by Pierre Boulez, in the first movement.
- Portraits in Rhythm and Portraits in Melody by Anthony J. Cirone, in Studies Nos. 16, 17, 24, 32, 39, 45, and 47.
- Requiem Canticles by Igor Stravinsky, for the last measure of the Prelude.
- The Rite of Spring by Igor Stravinsky. 2/16 is used in the concluding "Sacrificial Dance".

- Sketch, Op. 1 No. 10, by Alexei Stanchinsky.

=== 2/32 ===
- Bicinium by Charles Wuorinen, at bar 47.

== Upper number of 3 ==
=== 3/1 ===
- Chaconne in D major by Samuel Capricornus.
- 5 Motets by Peter Maxwell Davies.
- "O Fortuna" from Carl Orff's Carmina Burana (first four bars).
- Passacaglia in D minor by Johann Philipp Krieger.
- Piano Sonata No. 3 by Sigfrid Karg-Elert, in one measure.
- Poème des Montagnes, Op. 15 by Vincent d'Indy, in the first and last movements.
- Rosary Sonatas, by Heinrich Ignaz Franz Biber, for part of No. 11.
- Symphony No. 3 by Camille Saint-Saëns, in two sections (a total of 22 bars) at the end of the finale.
- Symphony No. 4 by Charles Ives.
- "Um Mitternacht" by Gustav Mahler (Rückert-Lieder No. 5). Bar 27 is marked "6/2 (3/1)".
- Russian Easter Festival Overture by Nikolai Rimsky-Korsakov, measure 668.
- Iubilum, Symphonic Celebration by Alberto Ginastera, in bars 198 and 202 of the third movement.

=== 3/16 ===
- Abraham and Isaac by Igor Stravinsky.
- Apollo by Igor Stravinsky, near rehearsal mark 23.
- Bicinium by Charles Wuorinen, at bars 1, 6, 11, 18, 23, 40, 50, 54, 58, 74, and 83.
- Cantata No. 1 by Anton Webern, in the second movement.
- 20 Caprices and Rhythmic Studies, by Émile Jaques-Dalcroze, in No. 10.
- Concerto for Piano and Wind Instruments by Igor Stravinsky, after rehearsal mark 39.
- Concerto for Two Pianos by Igor Stravinsky, in the second movement.
- Concerto in E-flat by Igor Stravinsky has a measure of 2/8+3/16 a few measures after rehearsal mark 4.
- Donna Diana Overture, by Emil von Reznicek.
- Douze études pour Caisse-Claire by Jacques Delécluse, in some measures of the last piece.
- Five Chromatic Dances for piano by William Albright, near the end of the third dance (parenthesized).
- Five Little Pieces by Peter Maxwell Davies, in the fourth piece.
- Hyperchromatica by Kyle Gann, in the movements Ride the Cosmos and Galactic Jamboree.
- Mädchentotenlieder, by Bo Nilsson, at bar 114.
- Piano Sonata No. 1 in C major, Op. 1, by Johannes Brahms. Movement II, bars 47–49 and 51–53.
- Piano Sonata No. 1 by Charles Wuorinen, at measure 29 of part 1.
- Pli selon pli by Pierre Boulez, in the first, second, and fourth movements.
- Portraits in Rhythm and Portraits in Melody by Anthony J. Cirone, in Studies Nos. 7, 17, 24, 32, 39, 40, 45, and 47.
- Requiem Canticles by Igor Stravinsky.
- The Rite of Spring by Igor Stravinsky, in the concluding "Sacrificial Dance".
- String Quartet, Op. 28, by Anton Webern in bars 40-41 and 44-51 of the third movement.
- String Trio, Op. 20 by Anton Webern, in bars 41-42 of the first movement and the beginning of the second movement.
- Symphonic Studies, Étude IX (first version) by Robert Schumann.
- Toccata, Op. 10, by Niels Viggo Bentzon, in a single measure.
- Variations for piano, Op. 27, by Anton Webern, movement I.

=== 3/32 ===
- Bicinium by Charles Wuorinen, at bars 5, 36–37, 39, 52, 65, 77, and 80.
- Contrapunctus by Mark Andre.
- Intrada, nebst burlesquer Suite, for two violins (the so-called "Gulliver Suite") by Georg Philipp Telemann. Movement II, "Lilliputsche Chaconne".
- Mädchentotenlieder, by Bo Nilsson, at bar 3.
- Piano Sonata No. 1 by Charles Wuorinen, at measure 13 of part 1.
- Pribaoutki by Igor Stravinsky, for bar 15 of the fourth piece, "Starets i zayats".
- String Quartet, Op. 28, by Anton Webern in bars 28-37 of the third movement.

== Upper number of 4 ==
=== ^{4}_{1/2} ===
- Carmina Burana by Carl Orff has a measure of ^{4} at the start of the movement Ecce gratum.

=== 4/1 ===
- 5 Motets by Peter Maxwell Davies.
- Pli selon pli by Pierre Boulez, in the third movement.
- Poème des Montagnes, Op. 15 by Vincent d'Indy, in the first and last movements.

=== 4/16 ===
- Abraham and Isaac by Igor Stravinsky.
- Bicinium by Charles Wuorinen, at bars 8 and 29.
- 20 Caprices and Rhythmic Studies, by Émile Jaques-Dalcroze, in No. 10.
- Five Chromatic Dances for piano by William Albright, near the end of the third dance (parenthesized).
- Le chant du rossignol by Igor Stravinsky, at the measure before rehearsal mark 37.
- Homenaje a Federico García Lorca by Silvestre Revueltas, for the entire first movement, "Baile" (Dance), except for one free-rhythm bar at the beginning and two at the end.
- Piano Sonata No. 1 in C major, Op. 1, by Johannes Brahms. Movement II, bars 46 and 50.
- Piano Sonata No. 3 in F minor, Op. 5, by Johannes Brahms. Movement II, bars 37–66 and 77–90.
- Pli selon pli by Pierre Boulez, in the first movement.
- Portraits in Rhythm and Portraits in Melody by Anthony J. Cirone, in Studies Nos. 16, 32, and 47.
- Pribaoutki by Igor Stravinsky, for bar 16 of the fourth piece, "Starets i zayats".
- Requiem Canticles by Igor Stravinsky, for two measures near the end of the Prelude movement.
- The Rite of Spring by Igor Stravinsky, in the concluding "Sacrificial Dance".
- String Quartet, Op. 28, by Anton Webern, in bars 52 and 53 of the third movement.
- Variations on a Theme by Robert Schumann, Op. 9, by Johannes Brahms. Variation XI.

=== 4/32 ===
- Bicinium by Charles Wuorinen, at bars 38 and 42.

== Upper number of 6 ==
=== 6/2 ===
- Cantata No. 1 by Anton Webern, in the first movement.
- Carmina Burana by Carl Orff, in the movement Ave formossisima.
- Hyperchromatica by Kyle Gann, in the movement Liquid Mechanisms.
- 12 Miniature Studies by Andrzej Panufnik, in the second study.
- Piano Sonata No. 1 by Charles Wuorinen, in its last two measures.
- Salvation is Created by Pavel Chesnokov is written without time signatures in the original Jurgenson edition, but the Choral Public Domain Library's edition adds more barlines as well as time signatures, and has two bars of 6/2.
- Symphony No. 4 by Charles Ives, for bar 102 of the third movement.
- "Um Mitternacht" by Gustav Mahler (Rückert-Lieder No. 5). Bar 27 is marked "6/2 (3/1)".

=== 6/32 ===
- Bicinium by Charles Wuorinen, at bar 45.
- Piano Sonata No. 1 by Charles Wuorinen, at measure 162 in part 1 (written ^{2}_{.}).

=== 6/64 ===
- String Quartet No. 4 by Ben Johnston.

== Upper number of 8 ==
Note: 8/4 or 8/8 may refer to an evenly divided compound duple or quadruple meter. While this is arguably extremely common in music, the notations 8/4 and 8/8 themselves are not, so all divisions of this time signature are listed here

=== 8/1 ===
- Pli selon pli by Pierre Boulez, in the third movement.

=== 8/2 ===
- Carmina Burana by Carl Orff, in the movement Reie.

=== 8/4 ===
- A Choral Fantasia, Op. 51, by Gustav Holst, for bars 36–69, 142–148, 173–178, and 191–198.
- Agon by Igor Stravinsky, at measure 164.
- "All You Need Is Love" by the Beatles. The main verse pattern contains a total of 29 beats, split into two 7/4 measures, a single bar of 8/4, followed by a one bar return of 7/4 before repeating the pattern.
- Chaconne by Andrew Violette, at measures 55 and 109.
- Custer and Sitting Bull by Kyle Gann, in measure 166 of part 3.
- "Damage Control" by John Petrucci has several bars in 8/4.
- Happy Ending (for David Garland) by Kyle Gann, in several sections.
- Hyperchromatica by Kyle Gann, in the movements Delta Oracle, 2.7 Kelvin, and Liquid Mechanisms.
- "I Ejaculate Fire" by Dethklok. Bars 81, 83, 85, and 88 are in 8/4.
- Lamentations and Consolations by Sergei Bortkiewicz, in some bars of Lamentation No. 1 and Consolation No. 4 (Sorrento).
- Lincoln, The Great Commoner by Charles Ives.
- Lonely Child (1980) by Claude Vivier has several measures of 8/4 (m. 143, 182 etc.).
- Mädchentotenlieder, by Bo Nilsson, at bar 73.
- Musica ricercata for piano, by György Ligeti, movement 2 (Mesto, rigido e cerimoniale) includes a single bar of 8/4.
- L'Oeuvre d'orgue by Jehan Alain, in the first movement of the Suite and in the third of the Trois Danses.
- Piano Sonata by Béla Bartók, in three measures of the second movement.
- A próle do bébé No. 2ba, by Heitor Villa-Lobos, for one measure in the fourth movement.
- The Rite of Spring by Igor Stravinsky, in the tableau "Mysterious Games of the Maidens", the bar before rehearsal 99 is in 8/4.
- De Staat by Louis Andriessen. Bars 686–87 are in 8/4.
- String Quartet No. 2, Op. 36 (1945), by Benjamin Britten. Movement I, bars 3 and 12 after rehearsal K are in 8/4.
- String Quartet No. 4 by Ben Johnston, in the Viola part.
- Study No. 22 by Charles Ives, in measures 3-4 and 18–19.
- Symphony No. 3 by Peter Maxwell Davies. Movement I has two bars of 8/4 (divided 3+2+3) at rehearsal N.

=== 8/8 ===
- Bicinium by Charles Wuorinen, at bar 90.
- Cantata No. 1 by Anton Webern, at measure 51 in the third movement.
- 20 Caprices and Rhythmic Studies, by Émile Jaques-Dalcroze, in Nos. 3, 6, 8, 9, 11, 15, 19, and 20.
- Charon by Richard Barrett, in bars 8-14 and 67.
- Concertino by Igor Stravinsky, at rehearsal mark 14.
- Concerto for Orchestra by Béla Bartók. Movement IV has three bars of 8/8 in the strings at rehearsal 75.
- Diversions for Piano Left Hand and Orchestra by Benjamin Britten.
- Fancy Free by Leonard Bernstein. In the fourth number, "Pas de deux", bars 324–325, 355–357, 359–361 are in 8/8.
- 36 Fugues, Op. 36 by Anton Reicha. No. 28 is in 6+2/8.
- Hesapa ki Lakhota ki Thawapi by Kyle Gann, in several measures.
- Hovenweep by Kyle Gann, in bars 35, 37, and 42.
- Mikrokosmos by Béla Bartók.
  - No. 103, "Minor and Major," has two measures, the first grouped 2+3+3 and the second as 3+2+3.
  - No. 140, "Free Variations," in some places.
  - No. 151, "Six Dances in Bulgarian Rhythm" 4, is in 3+2+3/8.
  - No. 153, "Six Dances in Bulgarian Rhythm" 6, is in 3+3+2/8.
- Music for Strings, Percussion, and Celesta by Béla Bartók.
  - Movement I, bars 1, 3, 5, 7, 9, 11, 13, 15, 19, 22, 26–27, 29, 38–40, 46, 53, 69, 71, 73, 75, 83, and 85 are in 8/8
  - Movement IV, bars 204, 207, 210, 213 are in 8/8.
- Petrushka by Igor Stravinsky. One bar before and five bars after rehearsal 4 superimposes a bar of 8/8 in piccolo 1 & 2, ob. 1 & 2, and trumpet 1, and piccolo 1 & 2, ob. 1–3, cornet 1 & trumpet 1, respectively against 3/4 in the rest of the orchestra.
- Piano Trio, Op. 45, by Gabriel Pierné. The second movement is mostly in 3+5/8.
- Piano Sonata No. 2 ("The Airplane"), by George Antheil. One of the bars is in 8/8.
- the first movement of the Piano Trio by Maurice Ravel, published in 1915, is in a Basque zortziko rhythm notated in 8/8.
- Pli selon pli by Pierre Boulez, in the first movement.
- 24 Quarter-Tone Preludes, Op. 22, by Ivan Wyschnegradsky, in Preludes 8, 9, 13, 17, and 24.
- the second of the two Skazki (Legends) Op. 8 by Nikolai Medtner, published in 1905, is in 8/8, where the eighth notes are grouped 3 3 2 but as each group begins on the upbeat, the listener actually hears 3 2 3.
- De Staat by Louis Andriessen. Bars 5, 8, 10, 12–16, 54–57, 83–84, 87–88, 582, 590, 602, 610, 612, 625, 630, 644, 647–48, 650, 663, 695, 707, 851, and 853 are in 8/8.
- Symphony No. 1 by Gustav Mahler. In Movement IV, the bar before rehearsal number 40 is in 8/8.
- Symphony No. 3 by Peter Maxwell Davies. Third movement has one bar of 8/8 before rehearsal X.
- Threni by Igor Stravinsky. Bars 83–84, 91, and 165 are in 8/8.
- Toccata from Two Fabrications by Fisher Tull, in one measure near the end.

=== 8/16 ===
- Abraham and Isaac by Igor Stravinsky, at measure 159.
- Agon by Igor Stravinsky. Measure 423 is in parenthesized 8/16.
- Canticum Sacrum by Igor Stravinsky, at measures 71–72.
- 20 Caprices and Rhythmic Studies, by Émile Jaques-Dalcroze, in Nos. 3, 5, 10, and 16.
- The Cry of Anubis, for tuba and orchestra by Harrison Birtwistle. Bars 33, 36, and 45–46 are in 8/16.
- The Flood by Igor Stravinsky. Bars 406, 414, 422, 427, 432, 440, and 448 are in 8/16 time, all divided 3+2+3.
- Histoire du soldat by Igor Stravinsky has one bar in 8/16 time, at the fourth bar following rehearsal 35, in the movement "Ragtime".
- Pli selon pli by Pierre Boulez, in the second movement.
- Poème des Montagnes, Op. 15 by Vincent d'Indy, in the movement "Danses Rhythmiques".
- 24 Quarter-Tone Preludes, Op. 22, by Ivan Wyschnegradsky, in Prelude 9, measure 16 (2+6).
- Requiem Canticles by Igor Stravinsky. The interlude has bar 156 in 8/16 time.

== Upper number of 9 ==
Time signatures that group nine beats into 3+3+3 are very common in music. This section only lists other groupings, such as 2+3+2+2, or any grouping with an unusual denominator (those other than 4, 8, and 16).

=== 9/4 ===
- Agon by Igor Stravinsky, at measure 167. Although other measures of 9/4 in the same section are subdivided 3+3+3, this measure is 3+2+2+2.
- Concertino by Igor Stravinsky, one measure after rehearsal mark 14 (subdivided 4+3+2).
- "The Count of Tuscany" by Dream Theater. The verse riff is in 9/4, with a rhythm of 3+2+2+3+3+2+3/8.
- "I Wanna Be a Movie Star" by Bill Wurtz. The main groove is in 9/4, but also includes measures in 11/4,12/4,13/4,7/4, and 12/16.
- "Kissing the Beehive" by Wolf Parade has its verses in 9/4.
- Lonely Child (1980) by Claude Vivier has 9/4 in measure 142.
- "The Start of Something Beautiful" by Porcupine Tree. The verses are in 9/4.
- Requiem Canticles by Igor Stravinsky has a measure of 9/4, grouped as 2+3+4, in the movement Libera Me.

=== 9/8 ===
- "Apocalypse in 9/8" by Genesis. Penultimate movement of the "Supper's Ready" suite, rhythm section plays a 9/8 riff as 3+2+4, organ solo plays polymetrically over this (sometimes 4/4, sometimes 7/4.)
- "Big Lie Small World", by Sting is in 9/8 with varying division.
- 20 Caprices and Rhythmic Studies, by Émile Jaques-Dalcroze, in Nos. 15 and 19 (both beamed as 2+2+2+3).
- "The Crunge" by Led Zeppelin. The main groove is in 9/8, grouped 5/8 + 4/8.
- Estancia by Alberto Ginastera. The refrain of "Los peones de hacienda", at rehearsal numbers 62, 65, 67, 68, 69+3, and 70 is marked "9/8 (3/4 – 3/8)"; the remainder is variously in 6/8, 3/4, 5/8, and 7/8.
- "I Hung My Head", by Sting is in 2+3+2+2/8.
- Mikrokosmos by Béla Bartók
  - No. 148, "Six Dances in Bulgarian Rhythm" 1, is in 4+2+3/8.
  - No. 152, "Six Dances in Bulgarian Rhythm" 5, is in 2+2+2+3/8.
- "Niška Banja", SATB choral arrangement by Nick Page of a Serbian Gypsy dance, is in 2+2+2+3/8.
- 24 Quarter-Tone Preludes, Op. 22, by Ivan Wyschnegradsky, in Preludes 4 (4+2+3) and 13 (5+4).
- "Scatterbrain" by Jeff Beck, from the album Blow by Blow, contains multiple sections in 9/8.
- "Vroom" by King Crimson contains a few measures in 9/8 during the bridge.
- "Blue Rondo à la Turk" by Dave Brubeck is mainly in 9/8, grouped as both 2+2+2+3/8 and 3+3+3/8.

=== 9/16 ===
- 20 Caprices and Rhythmic Studies, by Émile Jaques-Dalcroze, in No. 3 (grouped 5+4).
- How Miraculous Things Happen by Kyle Gann, in bars 127 and 134 (grouped 4+5).
- Hyperchromatica by Kyle Gann, in bars 6, 21, 173, and 188 of the movement Ride the Cosmos (all grouped 5+4).
- Piano Sonata No. 2 by Roger Sessions, at measure 337 (grouped 4+5).
- Requiem Canticles by Igor Stravinsky has a measure of 9/16 grouped as 3+4+2.

=== 9/32 ===
- Hyperchromatica by Kyle Gann, in bar 39 of the movement Ride the Cosmos.
- Un Vitrail et des Oiseaux by Olivier Messiaen uses 3+2+2+2/32.

=== 9/64 ===
- String Quartet No. 4 by Ben Johnston.

== Upper number of 10 ==
=== 10/2 ===
- Hyperchromatica by Kyle Gann, in bar 12 of the movement Liquid Mechanisms.

=== 10/4 ===
- Adagio 1972 by Kyle Gann, in measure 34.
- Apparition by Kyle Gann, in measures 6, 54, and 58.
- "Asphalt Meadows" by Death Cab for Cutie. Alternates 10/4 with 4/4.
- 20 Caprices and Rhythmic Studies, by Émile Jaques-Dalcroze, in No. 4.
- Concertino by Igor Stravinsky, two measures after rehearsal mark 14.
- The vocal coda section of "The ConstruKction of Light" by King Crimson has verses in 10/4.
- Five Chromatic Dances for piano by William Albright, in one measure of the fourth dance.
- "Just Like You Imagined" by Nine Inch Nails.
- Lonely Child (1980) by Claude Vivier has 10/4 in measure 141.
- "Playing in the Band" by the Grateful Dead (notated as 4+2+4/4).
- "Rabbit" by This Town Needs Guns has parts in 10/4.
- "Retreat! Retreat!", by 65daysofstatic is partially in 10/4.
- String Quartet No. 2, Op. 36 (1945), by Benjamin Britten. Movement I, fourth bar after rehearsal K ("tranquillo, lusingando") is in 10/4.
- "Testostyrannosaurus" by Hail the Sun, in some parts.
- "Unisphere" (1964) by The Dave Brubeck Quartet.
- "Wanderlove" by Mason Williams.
- "Diagonals" and "Parsec" by Stereolab are both in 10/4.

=== 10/8 ===
- 20 Caprices and Rhythmic Studies, by Émile Jaques-Dalcroze, in Nos. 1, 4, 8, 9, 11, and 19.
- Charon by Richard Barrett, in bars 36–42.
- 3 Danses from L'Oeuvre d'orgue by Jehan Alain, in the second dance.
- Hesapa ki Lakhota ki Thawapi by Kyle Gann, in several measures.
- Hovenweep by Kyle Gann, in bars 28 and 44–45.
- Hyperchromatica by Kyle Gann, in bar 200 of the movement Ride the Cosmos.
- "Nostalgia" by Yanni.
- Piano Quintet, Op. 41, by Gabriel Pierné, in the introduction to the third movement.
- Piano Sonata No. 1 by Charles Wuorinen, at measure 170 of part 2.
- Piano Sonata No. 2 ("The Airplane"), by George Antheil. One of the bars is in 10/8.
- Piano Sonata no. 2 by Roger Sessions, at measure 230.
- Poème des Montagnes, Op. 15 by Vincent d'Indy, in the movement "Danses Rhythmiques".
- 24 Quarter-Tone Preludes, Op. 22, by Ivan Wyschnegradsky, in preludes 4, 9, and 13.
- Sketch, Op. 1 No. 7, by Alexei Stanchinsky.
- Threni, id est Lamentationes Jeremiae Prophetae, by Igor Stravinsky. "Solacium", part 3 of "De Elegia Tertia".
- Village Idiot and its revisions as Fast Blue Village by Elena Kats-Chernin

=== 10/16 ===
- 20 Caprices and Rhythmic Studies, by Émile Jaques-Dalcroze, in Nos. 3 and 16.
- Concerto for Piano, Clarinet, and String Quartet by Roy Harris.
- The Death of the Hired Man by Andrew Violette.
- Étude, Op. 35, no. 12 in E major, for piano, by Charles-Valentin Alkan. (grouped as 5+5)
- Etude No. 1 by Tigran Hamasyan.
- Five Little Pieces by Peter Maxwell Davies, in the fourth piece (grouped as 6+4).
- How Miraculous Things Happen by Kyle Gann, in bar 97.
- Poème des Montagnes, Op. 15 by Vincent d'Indy, in the movement "Danses Rhythmiques".
- String Quartet No. 2 by Heitor Villa-Lobos, in a section of the last movement (incorrectly printed as 10/8)

=== 10/32 ===
- Hyperchromatica by Kyle Gann, in bars 50 and 158 of the movement Ride the Cosmos.

=== 10/64 ===
- String Quartet No. 4 by Ben Johnston.

== Upper number of 11 ==
=== 11/4 ===
- Adagio 1972 by Kyle Gann, in measures 11, 36, and 46.
- Apparition by Kyle Gann, in measure 3, 56, and 60.
- "Awaken" by Yes (first section).
- Concertino by Igor Stravinsky, just before rehearsal mark 15.
- Concerto in E-flat by Igor Stravinsky, just before rehearsal mark 25.
- "Crowned & Kissed" by Esperanza Spalding. The two-bar chorus groove is in 11/4 time.
- Custer and Sitting Bull by Kyle Gann, in some measures (70, 72, 75, etc.) of part 3 and the beginning of part 4.
- "Eight Ball, Coroner's Pocket" by Hail the Sun, intro is composed in 9/4, and 11/4.
- "Eleven Four", by Paul Desmond and recorded by the Dave Brubeck Quartet.
- How Miraculous Things Happen by Kyle Gann, in many measures.
- In Nomine IX, for harpsichord, by John Bull. 11/4, though it is not notated as such, either in the original manuscript or the new edition.
- Mädchentotenlieder, by Bo Nilsson, in bar 74.
- Requiem Canticles by Igor Stravinsky, in the first bar of the Libera Me.
- The Rite of Spring by Igor Stravinsky. The bar immediately before the section "The Chosen One" is in 11/4.
- "Testostyrannosaurus" by Hail the Sun, in some parts.
- "Whipping Post", by the Allman Brothers Band, begins with a two-bar 11/4 riff.

=== 11/8 ===
- Adagio 1972 by Kyle Gann, in measures 13 and 28.
- Bachianas Brasileiras No. 9, by Heitor Villa-Lobos. Movement II is in 11/8, grouped as 5/8 + 6/8.
- "Blockhead", by Devo. The verses are in 11/8 time.
- 2 Canzonas with Dances, Op. 43, by Nikolai Medtner, in Canzona No. 1.
- 20 Caprices and Rhythmic Studies, by Émile Jaques-Dalcroze, in No. 4.
- Composure by Kyle Gann, in measures 180 and 196.
- Custer and Sitting Bull by Kyle Gann, in measure 162 of part 1 and some measures (m. 19, 61, etc.) of parts 3 and 4.
- Cyclic Aphorism No. 2 by Kyle Gann, in bars 1-17 and 31–37.
- 3 Danses from L'Oeuvre d'orgue by Jehan Alain, in the second dance.
- "The Eleven" (1969) by the Grateful Dead.
- "Eleven" by Primus. The song is mainly in 11/8, the chorus has one bar in 9/8, and after two bars of 11/8 a bar in 12/8.
- Happy Ending (for David Garland) by Kyle Gann, in bars 52, 54, and 61.
- "Happy With What You Have To Be Happy With" by King Crimson contains sections in 11/8.
- "Here Comes the Sun" (1969), written by the Beatles' George Harrison. The song features 4/4 in the verses and a compound sequence of 11/8 + 4/4 + 7/8 in the bridge, phrasing interludes that Harrison drew from Indian music influences.
- Hesapa ki Lakhota ki Thawapi by Kyle Gann, in several measures.
- Hovenweep by Kyle Gann, in several measures.
- How Miraculous Things Happen by Kyle Gann, in bars 115, 120, 135, and 137.
- Hyperchromatica by Kyle Gann, in the movements Andromeda Memories, Busted Grooves, and 2.7 Kelvin.
- "In Re Con Moto Et Al" by Charles Ives uses 11/8.
- "Larks' Tongues in Aspic, Pt. 1", by King Crimson. The song is in 5/8 when the violin enters, then switches to 11/8. The song shifts between these metres for the remainder of the song.
- "Losing It" by Rush. Intro and verses are composed out of ten bars in 5/8, other parts are in 11/8.
- The race results screen from Mario Kart 64, composed by Kenta Nagata.
- "Man-Erg" (1971), by Van der Graaf Generator.
- Piano Sonata No. 2 in G major by Alexei Stanchinsky. Movement II is in 11/8.
- A próle do bébé No. 2, by Heitor Villa-Lobos. The first and last measures of the fourth movement are in 11/8, divided into 6/8 or 3/4, and 5/8.
- The chorus of "ProzaKc Blues" by King Crimson includes measures of 13/8 and 11/8.
- "Puedo Escribir" by Sixpence None The Richer.
- 24 Quarter-Tone Preludes, Op. 22, by Ivan Wyschnegradsky, in Preludes 4, 9, 10, and 17.
- Sagat's theme from Street Fighter II (video game), composed by Isao Abe is entirely in 11/8.
- "Serenade", a wedding recessional by Derek Bourgeois. The beginning and ending sections are in 11/8.
- Sketch, Op. 1 No. 5, by Alexei Stanchinsky.
- "Skrting on the Surface" by the Smile.
- "7empest" by Tool mostly alternates between 5/4 and 11/8 time.
- "Trapped in the Wake of a Dream" by Mudvayne (chorus in 11/8)
- "Upstart" written by Don Ellis and performed by the Don Ellis Orchestra
- "Where but for Caravan Would I?" by Caravan.
- "Herd Culling" by Porcupine Tree.
- "War of Kalinga" by Suraj Synthesist is majorly in a 11/8 . The 11 here works with inverted polyrhythm of 2 over 3 for first 8 beats & 3 over 2 for the last 3 beats. Some section also incorporates a 11 played like 5 1/2 (five and a half). The change of moods, breakdown and conclusion are suggested with 4 beat or un-timed parts too.

=== 11/16 ===
- 20 Caprices and Rhythmic Studies, by Émile Jaques-Dalcroze, in Nos. 3 and 16.
- Charon by Richard Barrett, in bar 65.
- Concerto for Piano, Clarinet, and String Quartet by Roy Harris.
- Custer and Sitting Bull by Kyle Gann, in some measures (m. 13, 15, 28, etc.) of parts 3 and 4.
- Earth-Preserving Chant by Kyle Gann, in measures 17, 300, and 314–315.
- How Miraculous Things Happen by Kyle Gann, in bar 136.
- Hyperchromatica by Kyle Gann, in the movements Ride the Cosmos and Spacecat.
- Lonely Child (1980) by Claude Vivier, in several measures (m. 95, 105, etc.).
- Mémoire by Gilbert Amy, in measure 88.
- Piano Sonata no. 2 by Roger Sessions, for some measures in the first movement.

=== 11/32 ===
- Bicinium by Charles Wuorinen, at bars 46 and 78.

=== 11/64 ===
- Bicinium by Charles Wuorinen, at bar 31.

== Upper number of 12 ==
Time signatures that group twelve beats into 3+3+3+3 are very common in music. This section only lists other groupings, such as 7+5, or any grouping with an unusual denominator (those other than 4, 8, and 16).

=== 12/2 ===
- Concerto for Piano, Clarinet, and String Quartet by Roy Harris, in one measure of the second movement.

=== 12/8 ===
- 24 Quarter-Tone Preludes, Op. 22, by Ivan Wyschnegradsky, in Prelude 10, measure 3 (7+5).

=== 12/32 ===
- Bicinium by Charles Wuorinen, at bar 28.
- Piano Sonata No. 1 by Charles Wuorinen, at measure 161 of part 1 (written ^{4}_{.}).
- Piano Sonata No. 32 in C minor, Op. 111, by Ludwig van Beethoven. Movement II from bars 48 to 64.

== Upper number of 13 ==
=== 13/4 ===
- Adagio 1972 by Kyle Gann, in measure 20.
- Custer and Sitting Bull by Kyle Gann, in measures 147 and 151 of part 3.
- "The Great Divide" by Don Ellis.
- How Miraculous Things Happen by Kyle Gann, in several measures.
- Hyperchromatica by Kyle Gann, for most of the movement Delta Oracle.
- Lonely Child (1980) by Claude Vivier, measure 1.
- "Rabbit" by This Town Needs Guns, in some sections.
- Requiem Canticles by Igor Stravinsky, in measure 276 (grouped 2+9+2)
- De Staat by Louis Andriessen. Bars 356 and 517.
- "Starless" (1974), by King Crimson.
- "World's Fair" (1964) by The Dave Brubeck Quartet.
- "Jóga" (1997) by Björk (chorus only).

=== 13/8 ===
- Adagio 1972 by Kyle Gann, in measure 45.
- "The Becoming" by Nine Inch Nails begins in this time signature.
- Custer and Sitting Bull by Kyle Gann, in measures 194-204 of part 4.
- Desert Sonata by Kyle Gann, in the first movement.
- "Electric Sunrise" by Plini
- Hovenweep by Kyle Gann, in several measures.
- Hyperchromatica by Kyle Gann, in the movements Andromeda Memories, Ride the Cosmos, and Spacecat.
- "I Will Be Absorbed", by Egg.
- "Lauft... Heisst Das Es Lauft Oder Es Kommt Bald..Lauft" by Faust.
- "Odd Boy" by Mutant-Thoughts, in the verses.
- A próle do bébé No. 2, by Heitor Villa-Lobos. A measure in the fourth movement, "O cachorrinho de borracha". It is divided into 6/8 or 3/4, and 7/8.
- The chorus of "ProzaKc Blues" by King Crimson in some measures.
- 24 Quarter-Tone Preludes, Op. 22, by Ivan Wyschnegradsky, in Preludes 4 and 10.
- "Serenade", a wedding recessional by Derek Bourgeois, the middle section.
- "Skimbleshanks, The Railway Cat" from Andrew Lloyd Webber's musical Cats. Introduction and chorus as (3+3+3+4). Verses in 4/4.
- De Staat by Louis Andriessen. Bar 724.
- "13th August" by FromUz.
- "To Negate" by Tigran Hamasyan.
- "Turn It on Again" by Genesis. The verses and choruses.
- "Mission" by Suraj Synthesist is completely in a 13/8.

=== 13/16 ===
- 20 Caprices and Rhythmic Studies, by Émile Jaques-Dalcroze, in No. 16.
- Charon by Richard Barrett, in bar 57.
- Custer and Sitting Bull by Kyle Gann, in some measures (m. 48, 64, etc.) of parts 3 and 4.
- Earth-Preserving Chant by Kyle Gann, in measure 209.
- Hyperchromatica by Kyle Gann, in the movements Ride the Cosmos and Spacecat.
- Piano Sonata no. 2 by Roger Sessions, at measure 154 of the first movement.
- A próle do bébé No. 2, by Heitor Villa-Lobos, for two measures in the ninth movement.
- The Terminator main theme, by Brad Fiedel.

=== 13/32 ===
- Hyperchromatica by Kyle Gann, in several bars of the movement Ride the Cosmos.

== Upper number of 14 ==
=== 14/4 ===
- Five Chromatic Dances for piano by William Albright, in one measure of the fourth dance.
- Polychromatics by Louis Gruenberg. No. 7, "Invocation," in one measure.

=== 14/8 ===
- Adagio 1972 by Kyle Gann, in measure 30.
- Chicago Spiral by Kyle Gann.
- 24 Quarter-Tone Preludes, Op. 22, by Ivan Wyschnegradsky, in Preludes 9 and 10.

=== 14/16 ===
- American Song Set by Andrew Violette, for two measures in one of the songs.
- 20 Caprices and Rhythmic Studies, by Émile Jaques-Dalcroze, in Nos. 3 and 16.
- Concerto for Piano, Clarinet, and String Quartet by Roy Harris.
- Hyperchromatica by Kyle Gann, in bars 4-5 and 171-172 of the movement Ride the Cosmos.
- Poème des Montagnes, Op. 15 by Vincent d'Indy, in the movement "Danses Rhythmiques".

== Upper number of 15 ==
=== 15/4 ===
- Hyperchromatica by Kyle Gann, in bar 41 of the movement Delta Oracle.

=== 15/8 ===
- Adagio 1972 by Kyle Gann, in measure 39.
- 20 Caprices and Rhythmic Studies, by Émile Jaques-Dalcroze, in Nos. 3, 6, and 9.
- Charon by Richard Barrett, in bar 69.
- "Chionoblepharou pater Aous" [Father of the bright-eyed Dawn], Hymn to the Sun, by Mesomedes of Crete (grouped 2+2+2+2+2+3+2)
- Concerto for Piano, Clarinet, and String Quartet by Roy Harris.
- Could Ye Loan Me Ten Pence? by Kyle Gann, in measures 22 and 57.
- Sections of "Endless Dream" by Yes.
- Happy Ending (for David Garland) by Kyle Gann, in bars 65 and 126.
- Hyperchromatica by Kyle Gann, in the movements Ride the Cosmos and 2.7 Kelvin.
- Passage of "Karn Evil 9", 1st Impression, Part 1 (1973), by Emerson, Lake and Palmer.
- "Limo Wreck" by Soundgarden.
- "Perpetuum Mobile" by the Penguin Cafe Orchestra.
- Piano Sonata Op. 25 No. 2, "Night Wind", by Nikolai Medtner.
- 24 Quarter-Tone Preludes, Op. 22, by Ivan Wyschnegradsky, in Prelude 21.
- "Tubular Bells" by Mike Oldfield. The first riff in 15/8 is made of two bars. The first bar is in 7/8, the second bar is in 8/8.
- "The Eight Miracle" by Bob Curnow, in measures 1-81, 129–161, 249–281, and 393–422.

=== 15/16 ===
- 20 Caprices and Rhythmic Studies, by Émile Jaques-Dalcroze, in Nos. 3, 16, and 20.
- Concerto for Piano, Clarinet, and String Quartet by Roy Harris.
- Concerto rotondo per violoncello solo (2000) by Giovanni Sollima, movement 4, bars 1–17, divided 5+3+4+3.
- Custer and Sitting Bull by Kyle Gann, in measure 131 of part 3 and some measures (m. 38, 58, 79, etc.) of part 4.
- Earth-Preserving Chant by Kyle Gann, in measure 215.
- Hovenweep by Kyle Gann, in bars 133 and 141.
- How Miraculous Things Happen by Kyle Gann, in several measures.
- Hyperchromatica by Kyle Gann, in the movements Ride the Cosmos and Busted Grooves.
- Lonely Child (1980) by Claude Vivier, in measure 104.
- The Phantom of the Opera (1986) by Andrew Lloyd Webber: "Notes" and "Notes II" each contain multiple sections, divided 4+4+4+3
- Piano Sonata no. 2 by Roger Sessions, at measure 100 of the first movement.
- Robert Browning Overture, by Charles Ives, in measure 330.
- De Staat by Louis Andriessen. Bars 501 and 535–36, divided 4+4+4+3 (in b. 501 some layers are in 3+3+3+3+3 and 3+4+4+3).
- String Quartet No. 1 (1949), by Leon Kirchner.
- String Quartet No. 4 by Ben Johnston, in the Violin 1 part.

=== 15/32 ===
- Custer and Sitting Bull by Kyle Gann, in measure 76 of part 3.
- Hyperchromatica by Kyle Gann, in five bars of the movement Ride the Cosmos.
- Piano Sonata No. 1 by Charles Wuorinen, at measure 163 of part 1 (written ^{5}_{.}).

== Upper number of 16 ==
=== 16/4 ===
- Custer and Sitting Bull by Kyle Gann, in measures 153, 157, and 162 of part 3.

=== 16/8 ===
- 20 Caprices and Rhythmic Studies, by Émile Jaques-Dalcroze, in No. 4.
- Desert Sonata by Kyle Gann, in the second movement.
- 24 Quarter-Tone Preludes, Op. 22, by Ivan Wyschnegradsky, in Prelude 10, measure 7.

=== 16/16 ===
- 20 Caprices and Rhythmic Studies, by Émile Jaques-Dalcroze, in No. 5.
- Concerto for Piano, Clarinet, and String Quartet by Roy Harris.
- Earth-Preserving Chant by Kyle Gann, in measure 210.
- Hyperchromatica by Kyle Gann, in bar 27 of the movement Ride the Cosmos.

== Upper number of 17 ==
=== 17/4 ===
- Adagio 1972 by Kyle Gann, in measure 12.
- Desert Sonata by Kyle Gann, in the first movement.
- "Panda" by This Town Needs Guns, in some verse section (subdivided 4+4+4+5=17). It also includes other meters like 3/4.
- "Seven Teens", by Lionel Loueke.

=== 17/8 ===
- Adagio 1972 by Kyle Gann, in measure 52.
- "The Alien" by Dream Theater.
- The intro of "Changes" by Yes.
- "The Hole Pt. 1" by Noisia is described by the band as being "more or less" in this time signature.
- "Hollow" by Björk.
- "Moon" by Björk.
- Sketch, Op. 1, No. 6, by Alexei Stanchinsky (written as 4/8 + 4/8 + 5/8 + 4/8, but with the 17/8 time signature written as well).
- "Trapped in the Wake of a Dream" by Mudvayne, verses

=== 17/16 ===
- Concerto for Piano, Clarinet, and String Quartet by Roy Harris.
- "DAY DREAM" from GuitarFreaks 4thMix & DrumMania 3rdMix by Mutsuhiko Izumi.
- Desert Sonata by Kyle Gann, in the first movement.
- Earth-Preserving Chant by Kyle Gann, in measures 30, 34, 51, 71, 75, 90, 115, 143, 147, 161, 201, 207, 242, 281, 285, and 309.
- Hovenweep by Kyle Gann, in bars 29 and 33.
- Hyperchromatica by Kyle Gann, in bars 2, 8, and 175 of the movement Ride the Cosmos.
- Sections of the instrumental Discipline by King Crimson, among other signatures.
- Mladi by Leoš Janáček, in the second movement.
- Piano Sonata No. 2 by Andrew Violette.

=== 17/32 ===
- Hyperchromatica by Kyle Gann, in bars 99, 101, and 102 of the movement Ride the Cosmos.

== Upper number of 18 ==
=== 18/8 ===
- "Birds of Fire" by Mahavishnu Orchestra. The guitar plays 5+5+5+3 while the drums play 6+6+6. The violin from time to time plays 3+3+2+3+3+2+2.
- 20 Caprices and Rhythmic Studies, by Émile Jaques-Dalcroze, in No. 6.
- 3 Danses from L'Oeuvre d'orgue by Jehan Alain, in the first and third dances.
- 49 Esquisses by Charles-Valentin Alkan. No. 12, Barcarollette, as compound sextuple meter.
- The first 38 bars of Nocturne No. 7, Op. 74 by Gabriel Fauré.
- 24 Quarter-Tone Preludes, Op. 22, by Ivan Wyschnegradsky, in Prelude 10, measure 8.

=== 18/16 ===
- American Song Set by Andrew Violette. One of the songs ends in 3/4(18/16) and another song has 18/16 in the piano's right hand against 3/4 in the piano's left hand and voice.
- 20 Caprices and Rhythmic Studies, by Émile Jaques-Dalcroze, in Nos. 3 and 20.
- The Death of the Hired Man by Andrew Violette.
- Desert Sonata by Kyle Gann, in the second movement.
- Diversions for Piano Left Hand and Orchestra by Benjamin Britten.
- Don Rodrigo by Alberto Ginastera. "Interludium III", except the last three bars, which are in 3/4.
- 4 Etudes, Op. 2, by Sergei Prokofiev. The second étude uses 18/16 in one hand against 4/4 in the other.
- Goldberg Variations, by Johann Sebastian Bach. Variation 26 uses 18/16 in one hand against 3/4 in the other, exchanging hands at intervals until the last five bars where both hands are in 18/16.
- 5 Klavierstücke, Op. 23 by Arnold Schoenberg, third piece, measures 26 to 30.

=== 18/32 ===
- Hyperchromatica by Kyle Gann, in five bars of the movement Ride the Cosmos.

== Upper number of 19 ==
=== 19/4 ===
- "33 222 1 222" by Don Ellis. Its title represents the subdivision: 3+3+2+2+2+1+2+2+2/4

=== 19/8 ===
- "Hell's Bells" by Bruford, variously subdivided as 7+7+5/8 and 4+4+4+4+3/8 throughout the song.
- Piano Sonata No. 2 ("The Airplane"), by George Antheil, for one bar.
- "Rusty Cage" by Soundgarden, third section.
- The main symphonic theme in Caravan's "A Hunting We Shall Go" from their 1973 album For Girls Who Grow Plump in the Night is in 19/8 time, which can also be interpreted in alternating 10+9/8.

=== 19/16 ===
- "Celestial Terrestrial Commuters" by Mahavishnu Orchestra.
- "Home" by Dream Theater, ending.
- "Keep It Greasy" by Frank Zappa on Joe's Garage (the first verse, some bridges and the guitar solo are counted in 19/16 and the second verse is in 21/16).

=== 19/32 ===
- Hyperchromatica by Kyle Gann, in bars 28, 29, and 111 of the movement Ride the Cosmos.

== Upper number of 20 ==
=== 20/8 ===
- Piano Quintet, Op. 41, by Gabriel Pierné, starting from fifth bar of rehearsal number 42 in the second movement.
- Piano Sonata No. 1 by Charles Wuorinen, in measure 155 of part 2.
- Threni, id est Lamentationes Jeremiae Prophetae, by Igor Stravinsky, in "Sensus spei", part 2 of "De Elegia Tertia", bar 4.

=== 20/16 ===
- 20 Caprices and Rhythmic Studies, by Émile Jaques-Dalcroze, in Nos. 11 and 20.
- Emily Dickinson's Book of the Dead by Andrew Violette.

=== 20/32 ===
- Hyperchromatica by Kyle Gann, in four bars of the movement Ride the Cosmos.

== Upper number of 21 ==
=== 21/8 ===
- 3 Danses from L'Oeuvre d'orgue by Jehan Alain, in one measure of the first dance.
- Happy Ending (for David Garland) by Kyle Gann, in bars 63 and 124.
- "In Re Con Moto Et Al" by Charles Ives.

=== 21/16 ===
- "The Art Of Dying" by Gojira (2008) cycles from 4/4 to 2/4 to 21/16 (grouped 5+5+5+3+3) and repeats this pattern during the intro and beginning of the song.
- Desert Sonata by Kyle Gann, in the second movement.
- Happy Ending (for David Garland) by Kyle Gann, in bar 129.
- Hyperchromatica by Kyle Gann, in the movements Ride the Cosmos and Busted Grooves.
- In the Dead of the Night suite by U.K., "contains an instrumental refrain in 21/16".
- "Keep It Greasy" by Frank Zappa on Joe's Garage, in the second verse.

=== 21/32 ===
- Hyperchromatica by Kyle Gann, in the movement Ride the Cosmos.
- Master of Puppets by Metallica features measures that can be interpreted as 21/32.
- String Quartet No. 4 by Ben Johnston, in the Viola part.
- Veil by Haken, includes one bar of 21/32 in the guitar/keyboard solo

== Upper number of 22 ==
=== 22/8 ===
- "The First Circle" from the album First Circle by the Pat Metheny Group, composed by Pat Metheny and Lyle Mays (22/8).

=== 22/16 ===
- Hyperchromatica by Kyle Gann, in the movement Ride the Cosmos.

=== 22/32 ===
- Hyperchromatica by Kyle Gann, in the movement Ride the Cosmos.

== Upper number of 23 ==
=== 23/16 ===
- Desert Sonata by Kyle Gann, in the first movement.

=== 23/32 ===
- Hyperchromatica by Kyle Gann has 23/32 in the movement Ride the Cosmos.

== Upper number of 24 ==
=== 24/1 ===
- "Brobdingnagische Gigue", from Intrada, nebst burlesquer Suite, for two violins (the so-called "Gulliver Suite") by Georg Philipp Telemann is in 24/1.

=== 24/4 ===
- Carmina Burana by Carl Orff has 24/4 (written as ^{8}_{.}) in the movement Veris leta facies.

=== 24/16 ===
- American Song Set by Andrew Violette. One of the songs is in 4/4(24/16) and two other songs have some measures in 24/16 in the piano's right hand against 4/4 in the piano's left hand and voice.
- Amor dammi quel fazzolettino by Andrew Violette has a passage of 24/16 in the first piano against 6/4 in the second piano.
- 20 Caprices and Rhythmic Studies, by Émile Jaques-Dalcroze, in Nos. 3 (as ^{24}(^{12})) and 11 (as ^{8}_{.}).
- The Death of the Hired Man by Andrew Violette.
- Suite in E Minor, HWV 438 by George Frideric Handel, for the Gigue.
- The Well-Tempered Clavier, Book 1 by Johann Sebastian Bach, in the upper stave of Prelude No. 15 (The bottom stave is in).

=== 24/32 ===
- Hyperchromatica by Kyle Gann, in the movement Ride the Cosmos.

== Upper number of 25 ==
=== 25/8 ===
- "How's This for Openers?" by Don Ellis.

=== 25/16 ===
- Happy Ending (for David Garland) by Kyle Gann, in bars 46, 51, 55, and 60.
- How Miraculous Things Happen by Kyle Gann, in bar 152.
- Hyperchromatica by Kyle Gann, in the movement Busted Grooves.
- "Memory Daydreams Lapses" by OSI.
- "Tenemos Roads" by National Health includes "some extremely intricate passages in 25/16".

=== 25/32 ===
- Hyperchromatica by Kyle Gann, in the movement Ride the Cosmos.

== Upper number of 26 ==
=== 26/32 ===
- Hyperchromatica by Kyle Gann, in the movement Ride the Cosmos.

== Upper number of 27 ==
=== 27/4 ===
- "Goliath" by Karnivool.

=== 27/16 ===
- The Death of the Hired Man by Andrew Violette has 27/16(^{3}_{.+.}) in measures 373 and 381.
- Desert Sonata by Kyle Gann, in the first movement.
- Hyperchromatica by Kyle Gann, in the movement Ride the Cosmos.
- Happy Ending (for David Garland) by Kyle Gann, in bars 45, 47, 50, 56, and 59.

=== 27/32 ===
- Hyperchromatica by Kyle Gann, in the movement Ride the Cosmos.
- String Quartet No. 4 by Ben Johnston, in the Violin 1 part.

== Upper number of 28 ==
=== 28/32 ===
- Hyperchromatica by Kyle Gann, in the movement Ride the Cosmos.

== Upper number of 29 ==
=== 29/4 ===
- Reverie in Prime Time Signatures by Robert Schneider, in measure 29.

=== 29/8 ===
- "March of the Pigs" by Nine Inch Nails.
- "The Undertow", by 65daysofstatic.

=== 29/32 ===
- Hyperchromatica by Kyle Gann, in the movement Ride the Cosmos.

== Upper number between 30 and 39 ==
=== 30 ===
- American Song Set by Andrew Violette. One of the songs has 30/16 in the piano's right hand against 5/4 in the piano's left hand and voice.
- Bicinium by Charles Wuorinen, at bar 89 (30/32, written as ^{10}_{.}).
- Hyperchromatica by Kyle Gann has 30/32 in bar 149 of the movement Ride the Cosmos.

=== 31 ===
- Athesie, by The Hirsch Effekt. The song is in 31/16, grouped as 16+15.
- "Fishing Frenzy" from Splatoon 2 and Splatoon 3 is in 31/16.
- Hyperchromatica by Kyle Gann has 31/32 in the movement Ride the Cosmos.

=== 32 ===
- The main section of "Vardavar" by Tigran Hamasyan is in 32/16, grouped as 5+5+3+5+5+4+5.
- "Variations for Trumpet" by Don Ellis has one section in 32/8.

=== 33 ===
- "Blues in 33/8" by Matt Savage (33/8).
- "Bulgarian Bulge" by Don Ellis (33/8).
- Charon by Richard Barrett has 33/8 in bar 60.
- Desert Sonata by Kyle Gann has 33/16 in the first movement.
- Hyperchromatica by Kyle Gann has 33/32 in the movement Ride the Cosmos.
- "In Re Con Moto Et Al" by Charles Ives (33/8).
- "Split Open and Melt" by Phish has a jam section in 33/8.

=== 35 ===
- "Entertain Me" by Tigran Hamasyan contains a repeating melody in 35/16, overlaid on top of the main 256/32 meter.
- "Nairian Odyssey" by Tigran Hamasyan contains a solo section in 35/16, divided variously as 6/4 + 5/16 + 3/8 and 6+8+6+9+6/16.

=== 36 ===
- American Song Set by Andrew Violette. One of the songs has a measure in 36/16 in the piano's right hand against 6/4 in the piano's left hand and voice and another has the same, but with 3/2 instead of 6/4.
- Charon by Richard Barrett has 36/8 in bar 58.
- The Death of the Hired Man by Andrew Violette has 36/16(^{4}_{.+.}) in bar 372.
- Organbook by Andrew Violette has 36/16.

=== 37 ===
- Hyperchromatica by Kyle Gann has 37/32 in the movement Spacecat.

== Upper number between 40 and 49 ==
=== 40 ===
- Charon by Richard Barrett has 40/8 in bar 54.

=== 41 ===
- Desert Sonata by Kyle Gann has 41/16 in the first movement.

=== 42 ===
- "Song for Melan and Rafik" by Tigran Hamasyan uses 42/16.

=== 43 ===
- Study No. 3a for Player Piano by Conlon Nancarrow uses 43/16.

=== 44 ===
- Charon by Richard Barrett has 44/8 in bar 50.

=== 47 ===
- Study No. 3a for Player Piano by Conlon Nancarrow uses 47/16.

=== 48 ===
- American Song Set by Andrew Violette. One song has a measure of 24/16 in the piano's right hand against 48/32 in the piano's left hand and 4/4 in the voice.

== Upper number between 50 and 59 ==
=== 51 ===
- Desert Sonata by Kyle Gann has 51/16 in the first movement.
- Hyperchromatica by Kyle Gann has 51/32 in the movement 2.7 Kelvin.

=== 53 ===
- "Interlude V" by Mannheim Steamroller from the album Fresh Aire II contains one measure of 53/8.

== Upper number more than 59 ==
=== 77 ===
- Charon by Richard Barrett has 77/16 in bar 56.

=== 86 ===
- Charon by Richard Barrett has 86/16 in bar 52.

=== 101 ===
- Hyperchromatica by Kyle Gann has 101/64 in the movement Spacecat.

=== 256 ===
- Entertain Me by Tigran Hamasyan is in 256/16, with 7 bars of 35/16 and 1 bar of 11/16, along with a 4/4 polymeter.

== Fractional time signatures ==
- Bicinium by Charles Wuorinen has ^{20 3/4}_{8} at bar 93.
- Driftwood Suite, for piano, by Gardner Read uses ^{3 1/2}_{4}, ^{4 1/2}_{4}, and ^{5 1/2}_{4}.
- Hill-Song I and II by Percy Grainger contain measures of ^{1 1/2}_{4} and ^{2 1/2}_{4}.
- Intrada, nebst burlesquer Suite, for two violins (the so-called "Gulliver Suite") by Georg Philipp Telemann. "Reverie der Laputier, nebst ihren Aufweckern" is in ^{3 2/2}_{4}.
- Lincolnshire Posy by Percy Grainger. Movement V, "Lord Melbourne", uses ^{1 1/2}_{4} and ^{2 1/2}_{4}.
- Mädchentotenlieder, by Bo Nilsson.
  - Bar 83 is in ^{4/3}_{4} time.
  - Bar 97 is in ^{3/5}_{4} time.
  - Bar 123 is in ^{2/3}_{4} time.
  - Bar 112 is in ^{4/5}_{4} time.
- Le marteau sans maître, by Pierre Boulez. Movement III "L'Artisanat furieux".
  - Bar 3 is in ^{4/3}_{2} time.
  - Bars 24, 35, and 43 are in ^{2/3}_{4} time.
- O: Eleven Songs by Dennis Báthory-Kitsz has a section in ^{4 1/2}_{4} in the second movement.
- Piano Piece 2 by Andrew Violette has a measure of ^{1 4/5}_{4}.
- Piano Sonata, Op. 43, by Harry Farjeon has three measures of ^{1 1/2}_{2} in the first movement.
- Piano Sonata No. 2, Concord, Mass., 1840–1860, by Charles Ives. In movement III "The Alcotts", bar 20 is in ^{4 1/2}_{4} time.
- Piano Sonata No. 3 by Carlos Chávez. Movement IV has measures in ^{2 1/2}_{4}, ^{3 1/2}_{4}, and ^{4 1/2}_{4}.
- Piano Sonata No. 3 by Andrew Violette has ^{4/5}_{4}, ^{1 2/5}_{4}, ^{3 1/3}_{4}, ^{3 1/2}_{8}, ^{4 1/2}_{8}, ^{5 1/2}_{4}, ^{5 1/2}_{8}, ^{7 1/5}_{4}, ^{8 1/4}_{4}, ^{12 1/2}_{4}, ^{19 1/2}_{8}, ^{55 1/2}_{4}, and ^{70 1/2}_{8}.
- "Schism" by Tool is described by the band as largely in ^{6 1/2}_{8} and includes numerous other times.
- Sensemayá by Silvestre Revueltas includes three bars in ^{5 1/2}_{8}.
- String Quartet No. 4 by Ben Johnston. The Violin 1 part has a bar of ^{7 1/5}_{32}.
- Study in Sonority by Wallingford Riegger contains several ^{2 1/2}_{4} bars.
- Study No. 23 by Charles Ives has ^{5 1/2}_{8}.
- Touch Piece, for piano, by Gardner Read uses ^{3 1/2}_{4}, ^{4 1/2}_{4}, and ^{5 1/2}_{4}.
- "Upstart" by Don Ellis is in ^{3 2/3}_{4} (originally written in 11/8).

== Irrational time signatures ==
- Amethyst, the first solo from the Seven Pillars suite by Andy Akiho has 4/24, 5/12, 5/24, and 7/24. carTogRAPh, the fourth solo, has 25/24
- Bicinium by Charles Wuorinen has 2/12 in bar 62.
- Berceuse from The Exterminating Angel by Thomas Adès has 1/6 and 1/12.
- Contrapunctus by Mark Andre has 1/40, 2/44, 2/52, 3/12, 3/15, ^{3}_{18.75}, ^{3}_{23.4375}, ^{3}_{29.296875}, 3/40, and 7/52.
- The Exterminating Angel Symphony by Thomas Adès has 1/6, 1/12, 2/6, and 5/12 in the first and third movements.
- The Four Quarters by Thomas Adès has 1/6, 1/12, 2/6, 2/12, and 4/12.
- Glaubst du an die Unsterblichkeit der Seele? (1983) by Claude Vivier has 1/3, 2/3, 1/5, 2/5, 3/5, 4/5, 6/5, 1/6, 4/6, 5/6, 4/7, 5/7 and 6/7.
- I'Itoi Variations by Kyle Gann. Bar 275 is in 2/3 time, bar 277 is in 7/12 time, and bar 299 is in 5/6 time.
- In Seven Days by Thomas Adès has a measure of 2/6.
- I Open and Close, the sixth part of Fictions by Richard Barrett, has 1/24 and 2/24.
- Lemma-Icon-Epigram by Brian Ferneyhough has 1/12, 1/20, 1/24, 2/10, 2/12, 3/10, 3/12, 4/10, 4/12, 5/10, 6/10, 7/10, 7/12, 8/12, and 9/12.
- Luxury Suite from Powder Her Face by Thomas Adès has 2/6 and 4/6.
- Piano Concerto by Thomas Adès has 1/6, 1/12, 2/3, 2/6, 3/5, 4/5, 4/6, 4/12, 5/12, 6/12, and 7/12.
- Piano Quintet by Thomas Adès has 1/5, 1/6, 1/7, 1/10, 1/12, 1/24, 2/5, 2/6, 2/7, 2/10, 3/5, 3/7, 3/9, 3/10, 3/14, 4/5, 4/6, 4/7, 5/6, 5/7, 2/4(5/10), 5/12, 6/7, 6/10, 7/10, 9/10, 3×5/12, 4×5/12, and 5×5/12.
- Piano Sonata No. 1 by Charles Wuorinen has 5/24 at measure 83 and 1/12 at measure 101 in part 1.
- In the fourth movement of Piano Sonata No. 3 by Carlos Chávez, bars 47, 49, 107, and 109 are written in 1/12.
- Superscriptio by Brian Ferneyhough has 1/10, 1/12, 1/20, 1/24, 1/40, 1/48, 2/10, 2/12, 3/10, 3/12, 3/20, 3/24, 3/48, 4/10, 4/12, 5/12, 5/24, 7/40, 7/48, and 11/48.
- Traced Overhead by Thomas Adès has 1/6, 2/5(4/10), 2/6, 3/10, 5/12, 5/24, 9/14, 9/20, 11/12, and 11/24.

== Combined unusual signatures ==
- "Anyone Who Had a Heart", by Burt Bacharach uses 4/4, 5/4, and 7/8.
- "Butterflies, Hummingbirds", No. 5 from Twelve New Etudes by William Bolcom, has parenthesized time signatures of 18/64, 20/64, and 38/64.
- Chichester Psalms by Leonard Bernstein uses irregular 9/2 and 9/4, 10/4 notated as 5+5/4, and 12/2.
- Earth, the fifth part of Fictions by Richard Barrett, has 2/16, ^{3}_{[16]}, ^{4}_{[16]}, 5/8, 5/16, 7/8, 7/16, 11/8, 11/16, 13/16, 15/8, 15/16, 17/8, 17/16, 19/8, and 25/16.
- The Exterminating Angel Symphony by Thomas Adès has 1/4, 5/4, 5/8, 7/4, 7/8, and 8/8.
- "Firth of Fifth": Introduction, by Tony Banks of Genesis, mixes duple and quadruple meters with 13/16 and 15/16 signatures.
- Intermezzo by Andrew Violette has 3/16, 4/16, 5/4, 5/8, 5/16, 7/8, 7/16, 8/16, 10/16, 11/16, and 20/16.
- I Open and Close, the sixth part of Fictions by Richard Barrett, has 1/8, 2/16, 3/16, 3/2, 5/8, 5/16, 7/8, 7/16, 7/32, 8/8, 11/16, 13/16, 15/16, 15/32, and 24/8.
- "I Say a Little Prayer" by Dionne Warwick uses two measures of 4/4, one measure of 10/4 and two measures of 4/4 for verses and 11/4 for its chorus.
- Klavierstück IX (1954–55/61) by Karlheinz Stockhausen uses 21/8, 34/8, 42/8, 87/8, and 142/8.
- Lemma-Icon-Epigram by Brian Ferneyhough has 1/8, 1/16, 1/32, 1/64 (in an additive time signature), 3/16, 5/8, 5/16, 5/32, 7/8, 7/16, 8/8, 9/16 (in various groupings such as 3+2+2+2), and 11/16.
- Lieder vom Wasser, the tenth part of Fictions by Richard Barrett, has 1/8, 1/16, 2/16, 3/16, 3/32, 5/8, 5/16, 5/32, 7/8, 7/16, 8/8, 11/16, 13/16, 15/16, and 43/16.
- The Long and the Short by Charles Wuorinen has 1/4, 1/8, 1/16 (in additive time signatures such as 5/4+1/16), 3/16, 4/4 (subdivided as 3/32+7/16+3/8+3/32), ^{4 1/4}_{4}, 5/4, 5/8, 5/16, 7/4, 7/8, 7/16, ^{7 1/4}_{4}, 8/4, 9/32, ^{11 1/2}_{4}, 12/4, 13/32, 24/4, 25/4, and 40/4.
- Love Duet by Andrew Violette has 1/4, 5/4, 9/4 (grouped 2+2+2+3), 15/8, 18/8, and 21/8.
- Organ Sonata by Andrew Violette has 5/4, 5/8, 18/8, and 24/16.
- Pastorale by Andrew Violette has 20/16 and 24/16.
- Piano Concerto No. 5 by Kaikhosru Shapurji Sorabji has 5/4, 5/8, ^{6}_{4 1/2} (six dotted quarter notes), 7/4, 7/8, 8/4, 8/8, 10/8, 11/4, 11/8, 13/8, 14/8, and 15/8.
- Piano Sonata No. 1 by Kaikhosru Shapurji Sorabji has 5/4, 5/8, 7/4, 7/8, 7/16, 8/8, 10/8, 11/8, 13/8, 14/8, 15/8, and 30/16.
- Piano Sonata No. 1 by Andrew Violette has 5/2, 5/4, 5/8, and 7/8.
- Piano Sonata No. 2 by Charles Wuorinen has 1/4, 1/8, 3/16, 5/8, 5/16, 7/4, 7/8, 7/16, 7/32, 8/4, 9/8 (grouped 4+2+3), 9/32, 10/4, 10/16, 10/32, 11/8, 11/16, 11/32, 12/4, 15/16, 15/32, 18/32, and 20/32 (written as ^{4}_{+}).
- Piano Sonata No. 3 by Andrew Violette has 1/4 (in additive time signatures such as 3/4+1/4), 1/8, 1/16 (in additive time signatures such as 4/4+1/16), 5/4, 5/8, 7/4, 7/8, 7/16, 8/8, 8/16, 9/16 (grouped 4+5), 10/4, 10/8, 10/16, 11/8, 11/16, 13/4, 13/16, 14/8, 14/16, 15/4, 15/8, 15/16, 16/16, 17/8, 17/16, 18/8, 19/8, 19/16, 20/16, 21/8, 21/16, 24/16, 27/16 (written as ^{3}_{+}), 28/16, 31/8, 34/8, 36/8, 40/8, 56/8, 60/4, 60/8, 74/8, 90/16, and 93/16.
- Piano Sonata No. 3 by Charles Wuorinen has 6/8+1/32, 3/16, 3/32, ^{4 1/2}_{4}, 5/4, 5/8, ^{5 1/2}_{4}, ^{6 1/3}_{4}, 7/8, 7/16, ^{7 1/3}_{8}, 9/16 (grouped 4+5), 9/32, 10/16, 11/8, 11/16, 13/16, 15/16, and 17/16.
- Piano Sonata No. 4 by Charles Wuorinen has 5/4, 5/8, 7/8, 7/16, 8/8, 9/8 (both 4+5 and 6+3), 4+5/16, 10/16, 11/8, 11/16, 15/16, and 21/16.
- Quirl by Brian Ferneyhough has 1/8, 3/16, 3/32, 5/8, 5/16, 5/32, 5/64, 7/8, 7/16, 7/32, 7/64, 8/8, 9/32, 10/8, 11/16, 11/32, 13/16, and 15/64.
- Quintet No. 1 by Kaikhosru Shapurji Sorabji has 2/1, ^{2 1/2}_{4}, 5/4, ^{5}_{4 1/2} (five dotted quarter notes), 7/4, 7/8, 8/4, 8/8, 10/4, 10/8, 11/8, 13/4, 14/8, 15/8, and 20/8.
- Salve Regina, the second of 4 Madrigals by Andrew Violette, has 5/4, 5/8, 7/4, 7/8, 9/8 (4/4+1/8), 13/8, and 18/8 (3+4+5+6/8).
- Sonata for Cello and Piano by Elliott Carter has 5/4, 5/8, 5/16, 7/16, 14/32, and 21/32.
- String Quartet No. 1 by Elliott Carter has 2/16 (as part of an additive time signature), 4/16, 5/4, 5/8, 5/16, 7/8, 7/16, 8/16, 9/32 (written as ^{3}_{.}), 10/8, 10/16, 12/32 (written as ^{4}_{.}), 14/16, 15/8, 15/16, 18/8, 18/16, 20/16, and 21/8.
- String Quartet No. 2 by Elliott Carter has 4/16, 5/4, 5/8, 15/8, 7/16, 10/8, 10/16, 14/16, 15/8, 15/16, and 21/16.
- String Quartet No. 3 by Elliott Carter has 3/16, 3/32 (in an additive time signature), 5/4, 5/8, 5/16, 7/8, 7/16, 9/32, 11/16, 12/32 (in an additive time signature), 24/16, 24/32, and 27/32.
- Structures by Pierre Boulez.
  - Ia: 3/16, 4/16, 5/16
  - Ib: 1/8, 1/32, 2/16, 2/32, 3/16, 3/32, 4/16, 4/32, 5/4, 5/8, 5/16, 5/32, 6/32, 7/8, 7/16, 7/32, 8/32, 9/32
  - Ic: 3/16, 5/16, 5/32
  - II, Chapter 1: 1/4, 1/8, 1/16, 3/16, 5/8, 5/16, 7/8, 7/16, 3+5/16
  - II, Chapter 2: 5/4, 7/4, 11/4
- Superscriptio by Brian Ferneyhough has 1/8, 1/16, 1/32, 3/16, 3/32, 3/64, 5/16, 5/32, 5/64, 7/16, 7/32, and 7/64.
- The Tempest by Thomas Adès.
  - Suite: 3/16, 5/4, 5/8, 5/16, 7/8, and 7/16.
  - Storm Suite: 1/8, 5/4, 5/8, 7/4, and 7/8.
- The Third Sanctuary in the Deltarune soundtrack by Toby Fox has sections in 9/4, 11/8, 4/8, 5/4 and 12/8.
- Thrak by King Crimson switches between 5/8, and 7/8 throughout the head section.
- Traced Overhead by Thomas Adès has 1/2, 1/4, 1/8, 2/1, 3/16, 5/4, 5/8, and 7/4.
- Tract, the eighth part of Fictions by Richard Barrett, has 1/8, 2/16, 4/32, 5/8, 5/16, ^{5}_{[32]}, ^{6}_{[32]}, 7/8, 7/16, 7/32, 8/8, ^{8}_{[32]}, 9/32, 10/32, 11/8, 11/16, 11/32, ^{12}_{[32]}, 13/16, 13/32, 14/32, 15/8, 15/16, 15/32, 18/8, 19/32, 20/8, and 21/8.
- Zeitmaße by Karlheinz Stockhausen uses 1/2, 1/8, 1/16, 2/16, 2/32, 3/16, 3/32, 4/16, 8/8, 8/32, 11/16, 12/32, 17/32, 23/32, and 30/32.

== See also ==
- Bulgarian folk dance
- Free time (music)
- Mathcore
- Math rock
- Metre (music)
- Progressive rock
- Greek dances
  - Ai Georgis
  - Kalamatianos
  - Karsilamas
  - Tsakonikos
  - Zeibekiko
