= Aline van Barentzen =

Classical Pianist

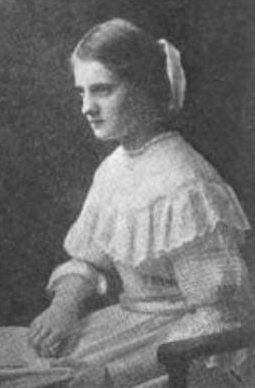
- Born: Aline Hoyle; 17 July 1897; Somerville, Massachusetts
- Died: 30 October 1981 (aged 84); Paris, France
- Education: Conservatoire de Paris
- Occupation: Pianist

Aline van Barentzen (born Aline Hoyle; 17 July 1897 – 30 October 1981) was a Franco-American classical pianist.

== Biography ==
Van Berentzen was born in Somerville, Massachusetts and gave her first concert at the age of four. At a young age, her mother took her to Paris to pursue formal music training. At age seven, she played Beethoven's Piano Concerto No. 1 and, at nine, she entered the Conservatoire de Paris. There, her teachers were Marguerite Long, Mrs. Marcou and Élie-Miriam Delaborde. In 1909, at only eleven years of age, she was awarded a First Prize at the Paris Conservatory piano competition, a record that still holds today (Le Matin 10 July 1909):

Of all, Miss Van Barentzen indisputably distinguished herself by her age (eleven years eleven months) and her impeccable technique. It is assured that for the comprehension of musical texts, she still has much to learn, but that this being acquired outside the Conservatory, it is only justice that she left it without more dwelling on it. (Georges Cochet).

She then continued her training with Heinrich Barth and Ernst von Dohnanyi in Berlin, where she also met young Arthur Rubinstein and Wilhelm Kempff. She completed her training in Vienna with Theodor Leschetizky.

She eventually settled in Paris, where she was surrounded by many prominent musicians and composers of the time. She played works by Enesco, Poulenc, Messiaen, Roussel and Heitor Villa-Lobos. On 24 October 1927, she premiered Villa-Lobos' Chôros No. 8 (composed in 1925 for two pianos and orchestra) at the Concerts Colonne in Paris with Tomás Teran, under the direction of the composer.

She gave concerts throughout Europe and recorded for His Master's Voice.

In the early 1930s, she applied for and obtained French citizenship, remaining in Paris through the Occupation.

Van Barentzen taught throughout her life, first at the University of the Arts (Philadelphia) and the Conservatorio Nacional Superior de Música (Argentina). In 1954, she was appointed professor of piano at the Paris Conservatory, a position she held until 1967. Among her pupils were Jean-Philippe Collard, Bernard Job and Cyprien Katsaris.

She premiered works by Henri Martelli (Fantaisie sur un thème malgache, 1946), Florent Schmitt (Hasards, 1943), and Villa-Lobos' (A prole do bebe n°2, Chôros No. 8, 1925).

She also composed for piano under her birth name, Aline Hoyle.

She died in the 16th arrondissement of Paris on 30 October 1981.

== Discography ==
Selected recordings:

- De Falla - Noches en los Jardines de España - Orchestre Symphonique (7 June 1928, Gramophone W 938/40a Matrice CT 4031/35 R).
- De Falla - Andaluza (Piezas Españolas n°4) (11 June 1928, Gramophone W 940b Matrice CT 4050).
- Beethoven's Piano Sonata No. 21, Op. 53, Piano Sonata No. 23, Op. 57 (La Voix de son Maître FALP199)
- At Trianon in 1961: Daquin, Le Coucou; Rameau, La Poule; Mozart's Rondo à la turque (de la Sonate K.331); Beethoven's Für Elise; K.M. Weber, Perpetuum mobile (from Sonata Op. 24); Schubert's Mouvement musical D.780/3; Mendelssohn's 3 Chansons sans paroles; Schumann's Dreaming Op. 15/7 (from Kinderszenen); Chopin's Waltz in C-sharp minor, Op. 64, No. 2; Liszt's Hungarian Rhapsody No. 2, Liebestraum No. 3; Brahms's Valz Op. 39/15; Debussy's Clair de lune (3rd mvt of the Suite bergamasque); Ravel's Rigaudon (Le Tombeau de Couperin); Poulenc's Mouvement perpétuel n°1; Villa-Lobos, O Polichinelo.

Sound documents:

- Beethoven's Choral Fantasy - Orchestre national de la Radiodiffusion, conductor Roger Désormière, in public and broadcast from the Théâtre des Champs-Élysées, 20 May 1948.
- Cortège Burlesque, last movement of the piano concerto (Concert dans un Parc) by André Lavagne.

== Bibliography ==
- Pâris, Alain (2004). Dictionnaire des interprètes et de l'interprétation musicale depuis 1900. Bouquins (in French). Paris: Éditions Robert Laffont. p. 1289. ISBN 2-221-10214-2. OCLC 300283821. BnF=39258649x.
