= Chôros No. 8 =

- Chôros by Heitor Villa-Lobos
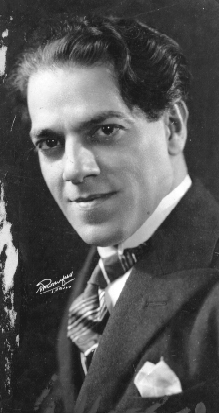
- Heitor Villa-Lobos
- Catalogue: W208
- Composed: 1925: Rio de Janeiro
- Dedication: Tomás Terán
- Published: 1928: Paris
- Publisher: Max Eschig
- Recorded: February 1945 Philharmonic-Symphony Orchestra of New York; Heitor Villa-Lobos, cond. (2 sound discs: analog, 33⅓ rpm, monaural, 16 in. Américas Unidas: matrix CH413 and CH416. Distributed electrical transcription recordings, with labels and announcements for Spanish-speaking audiences. Also includes Chôros No. 9.)
- Duration: 22 mins.
- Scoring: orchestra; two pianos

Premiere
- Date: 24 October 1927:
- Location: Salle Gaveau, Paris
- Conductor: Heitor Villa-Lobos
- Performers: Orchestre des Concerts Colonne, Aline van Barentzen and Tomás Terán, pianos

Chôros No. 8 is a work for orchestra and two pianos, written in 1925 by the Brazilian composer Heitor Villa-Lobos. It is part of a series of fourteen numbered compositions collectively titled Chôros, ranging from solos for guitar and for piano up to works scored for soloist or chorus with orchestra or multiple orchestras, and in duration up to over an hour. A recording of Chôros No. 8 conducted by the composer lasts 22 minutes.

== History ==
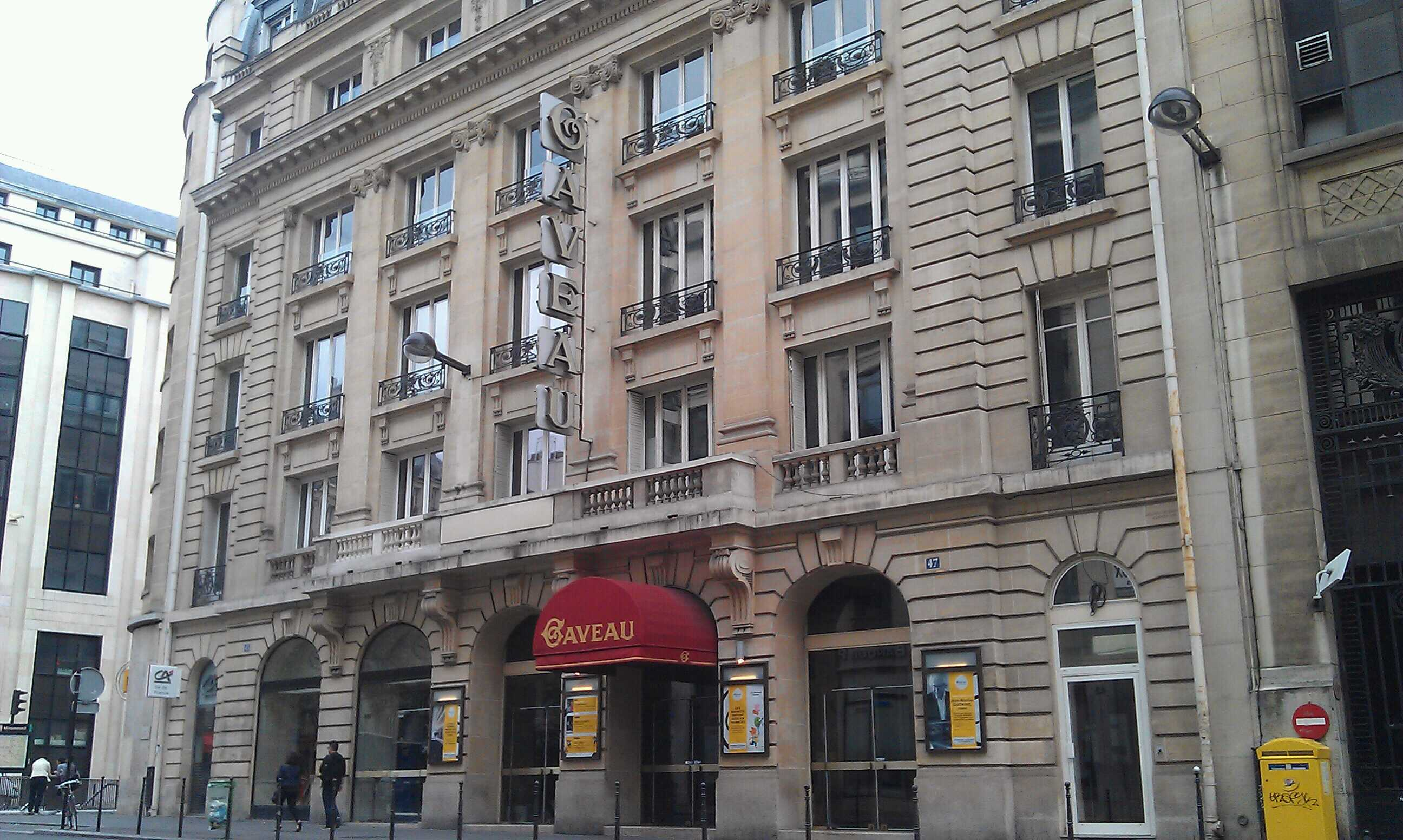
The Salle Gaveau, where Chôros No. 8 was premiered in 1927

Chôros No. 8 was composed in Rio de Janeiro in 1925, and the score is dedicated to the pianist Tomás Terán. It was premiered in Paris on 24 October 1927, at the Salle Gaveau, with the composer conducting the Orchestra of the Concerts Colonne and Aline van Barentzen and Tomás Terán, pianos. The first American performance took place on 12 April 1929 in Philadelphia, again with Barentzen and Terán playing the pianos, and the Philadelphia Orchestra conducted by Leopold Stokowski. Despite these documented performances, the year of composition has been called into question by one scholar, who asserts that the work was conceived in Paris in 1925, but completed only after the composer's return to Rio de Janeiro in 1930.

The work was never performed in Latin America in the composer's lifetime. The first performance in Brazil took place in the context of a Villa-Lobos Festival at the Theatro Municipal in Rio de Janeiro on 23 November 1963, with Luiz Carlos de Moura Castro and Luiz Medalha, pianos, and the Orquestra Sinfônica Nacional, conducted by Isaac Karabtchevsky.

== Instrumentation ==
Chôros No. 8 is scored for two pianos and an orchestra consisting of piccolo, 2 flutes, 2 oboes, cor anglais, 2 clarinets, bass clarinet, alto saxophone, 2 bassoons, contrabassoon, 4 horns, 3 trumpets, 4 trombones, tuba, timpani, percussion (bass drum, tam-tam, tambourine, tamborim, snare drum, triangle, cymbals, 2 metal chocalhos (small and large), reco-reco, caracaxá, caraxá, puíta, ratchet, xylophone), celesta, 2 harps, and strings.

== Analysis ==
At the time of its Paris premiere, this Chôros was called "Le fou huitième" (The Mad Eighth), for its extravagant scoring and unconventional performing techniques, as well as for its superimposition of multiple opposing rhythms and tonalities. It has been described as Villa-Lobos's most fauvist and "modern" composition from the 1920s, formally the most irregular, most violent, and "tropical" of all Villa-Lobos's works, whose leading feature is its almost complete atonality and dissonance. It has been claimed there is virtually nothing in this work that could be called a "theme", and the work "is not about thematic groups and their symphonic development". Instead, its material consists of motifs, phrases, and thematic fragments, mostly consisting of between three and five diatonic or chromatic notes and note repetitions.

Both of these positions have been challenged. While it is conceded to be Villa-Lobos's most dissonant work, analysis shows this is a case of polytonality, rather than atonality, and while the use of short repeated motifs with variations and rhythmic transformations are the essence of primitivist rhythmic animation, these procedures are also the very definition of symphonic thematic development.

The composer characterised the work as the "Dance Chôros", and construed the fragmented and contrapuntally intertwined opening themes as "sensually complex and atonal in order to deliberately give the feeling of nervousness of a crowd that is gathering to dance". The work appears to be conceived as an exploration of the possibilities of concatenation of sound blocks assembled from ostinato figurations. In fact, there are something like thirty-six different ostinatos, which are used to coordinate a complex stream of sounds.
