= Rhythmicana =

Avant-garde piano composition

- by Henry Cowell
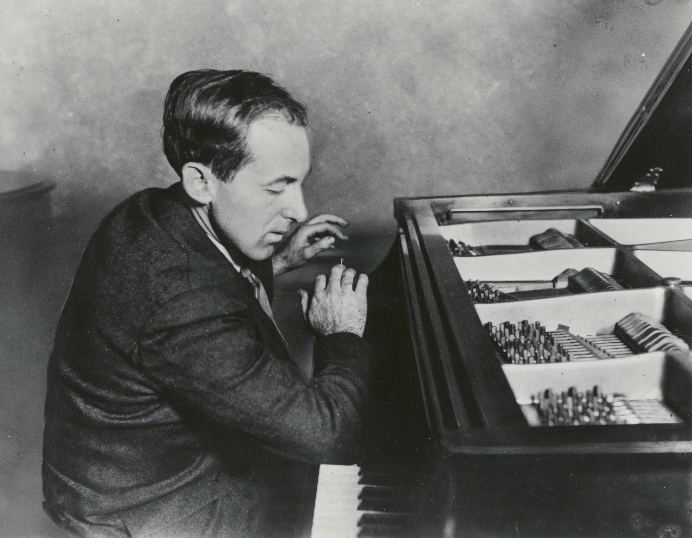
- Cowell at the piano, c. 1920s
- Catalogue: HC 557
- Composed: 1938
- Performed: February 11, 1940
- Movements: 3
- Scoring: Piano

Henry Cowell's 1938 work Rhythmicana is a suite of piano pieces centered on polyrhythms and dissonant counterpoint. It is known for its unusual time signatures, with the first two movements being in 1/1 time, and the third movement having the polymeter of 3/4 in the right hand and 5/4 in the left.

== Background ==
Cowell had already used the title for his rhythmicon concerto seven years earlier. The complexity results from Cowell's lifelong preoccupation with rhythmic exploration. The piece is dedicated to J. M. Beyer.

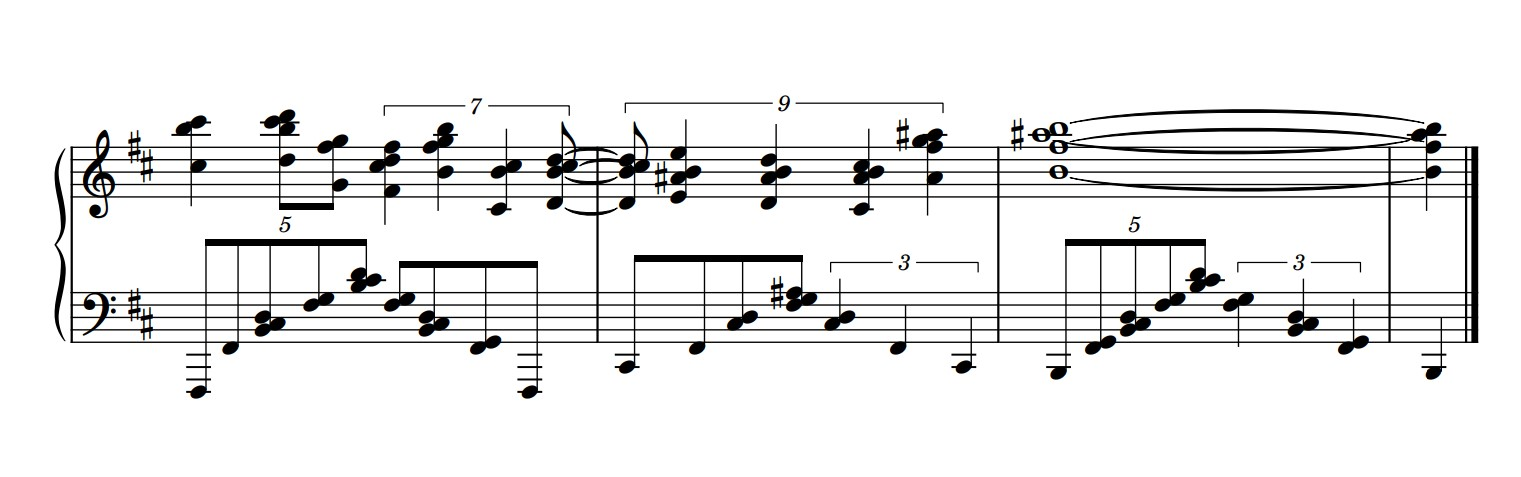
The last three measures of the first movement, showing the conflicting polyrhythms and tone clusters
