= Jacques Delécluse =

French percussionist and composer

Jacques Delécluse (15 September 1933 – 29 October 2015) was a French percussionist and composer born in Béthune. He played both timpani and piano in the Orchestre de Paris and taught at the Conservatoire de Paris.

Delécluse's father, Ulysses Delécluse, was a French clarinettist and pedagogue. Jacques studied Piano at the Conservatoire de Paris, eventually taking up studies in percussion as well. In 1950, he won First Prize in piano and Second Prize in percussion, going on to win First Prize in percussion the following year.

Delécluse was known as the "Master of the Percussion Étude" for his 12 Etudes for Snare Drum released in 1964. These études have become commonplace in the orchestral percussion repertoire.

== Discography ==
- Quintuple, with works by Nguyễn Thiên Đạo and Marius Constant
