= Piano Sonata No. 3 (Chávez) =

Music composition

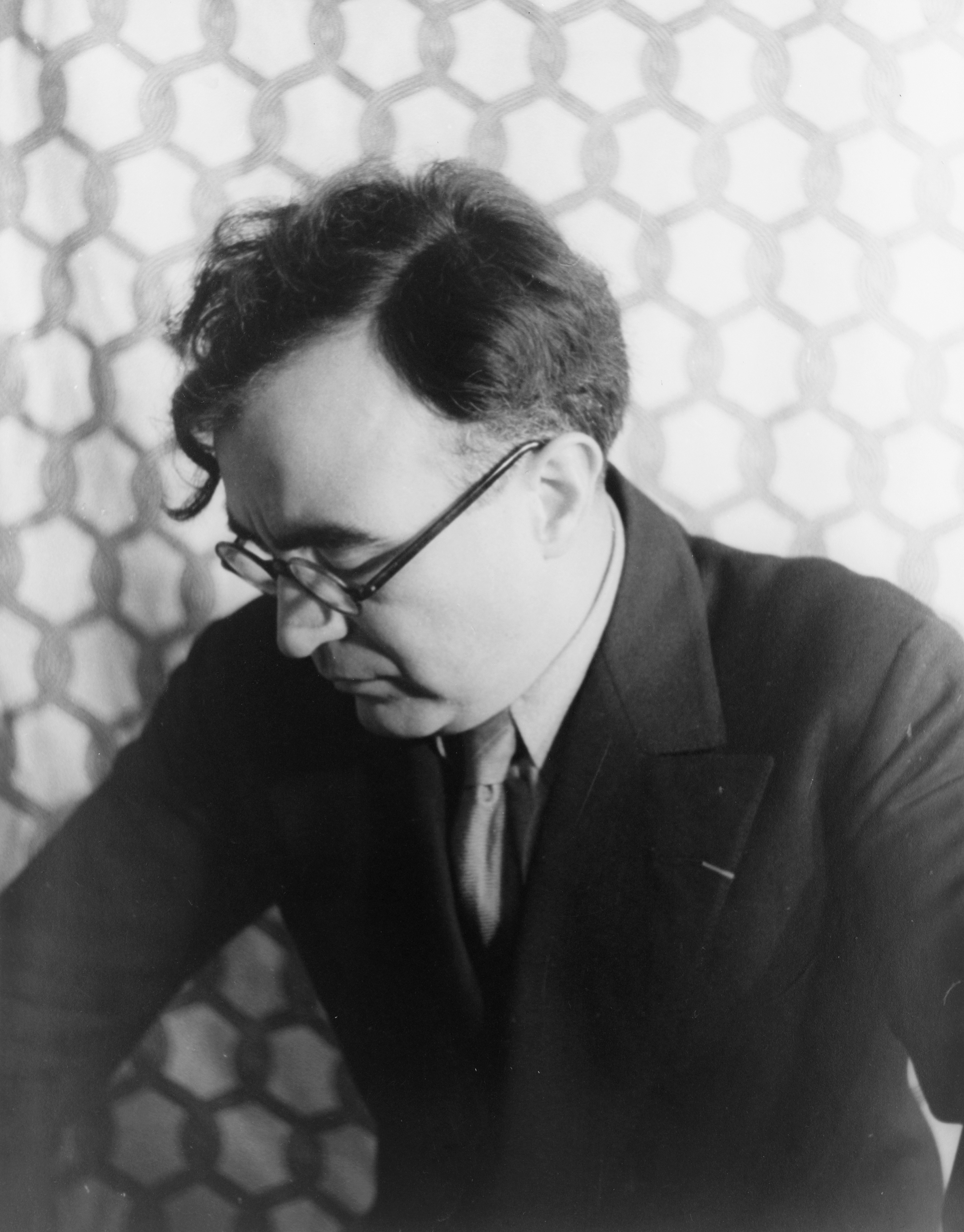
Carlos Chávez in 1937

Piano Sonata No. 3 is a solo piano work written in 1928 by the Mexican composer Carlos Chávez.

== History ==
Chávez composed his Third Piano Sonata in New York during January and February 1928, and dedicated the score to Aaron Copland. The composer himself gave the first performance at the Edyth Totten Theatre in New York on 22 April 1928, on the first of the Copland-Sessions Concerts. Although he had composed two piano sonatas previously, the score was first published simply as "Sonata for Piano" in the January 1933 issue (vol. 6, no. 2) of Henry Cowell's New Music Quarterly.

== Analysis ==
The sonata is in four movements:

1. Moderato ♩ = 88
2. Un poco mosso ♩ = 138
3. Lentamente ♩ = 72
4. Claro y conciso ♩ = 126

Angular melodies, a percussive approach to the instrument, employment of stark and concise one- or two-measure units, abrupt changes of register, rhythmic irregularity, and a harmonic profile that blends frequent vertical seconds, sevenths, and ninths with sudden, stark octaves are the leading features of the sonata. Chávez deliberately avoids overtly expressive elements, but uses a fundamentally diatonic polyphony which does not prevent him from achieving the harshest sonorities. The sonata adheres to a neoclassical aesthetic, linked to notions of simplicity, balance, and purity, though not resembling very closely the European (Stravinskian) model of neoclassicism.

The short first movement serves as a kind of slow introduction in two main sections, which may be viewed either as a simple double exposition, or as an adaptation of binary form, with a short transitional passage inserted between the two parts in b. 33–39. There is no conventional thematic development. Instead, Chávez builds the movement from discrete rhythmically based patterns: the first is two bars long, the second is three bars with a corresponding expansion of the pitch range, and the third increases further to four measures and adds a rocking figure in the left hand. Transformation and repetition of these patterns cumulate into a tight construction of cellular units. At the same time, a four-note pitch cell (F♯/G, C, F), introduced in the right hand, is repeated numerous times, mostly untransposed (except by octaves) and always in the same rhythm.

The second movement functions as the allegro proper, with a double exposition. It is characterised by a free contrapuntal texture, almost always in two voices, and a fluctuating polyrhythm, with superposed groups of two, three, and four diversely varied figures. The meter is constantly in flux, and tonality is not clearly defined, producing a modal quality.

The third movement is a slow and enigmatic fugue in four voices. The writing reflects the composer's preference at this point in time for pure, absolute music, free of any suggestions of philosophical, literary, or plastic imperatives.

The fourth movement, in rapid tempo and at first in a steady triple rhythm, combines the functions of finale and scherzo. In its intricate, jazz-like syncopated rhythms and abundance of large melodic leaps it is close in character to two piano pieces Chávez wrote in the same year: Blues and Fox. With hard contours and acerbic tone, it features the extreme ranges of the instrument. Like the first movement, it is built in superimposed patterns of short, incisive motives. After the opening section, the meter constantly changes, as in the second movement, and features unusual time signatures such as 1/12, ^{2 1/2}_{4}, ^{3 1/2}_{4}, and ^{4 1/2}_{4}. Formally, the movement falls into four roughly equal sections and resembles a variation form.
