= A prole do bebe =

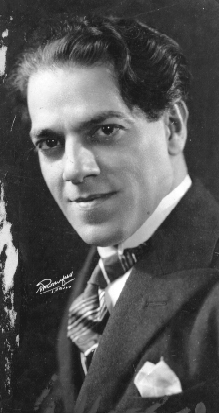
Heitor Villa-Lobos, c. 1922

A prole do bebê—spelled A próle do bébé in the scores, which were published before the 1943 orthography reform—(The Baby's Family) is a collection of character pieces by Heitor Villa-Lobos for piano. It was composed in three volumes. The volume known as Series 1 was composed in 1918, and Series 2 in 1921. The Third Series was composed in 1916, but it was not published and the manuscript has been lost. According to another source, although the unpublished manuscript has not been located, Series 3 was composed in 1926 and, like Series 2, is dedicated to Aline van Barentzen, whereas Series 1 is dedicated to the composer's wife, Lucilia Villa-Lobos. According to yet another, contemporary source, the third series was "en préparation" as of 1929 and would be titled Sportsman.

== Book 1 (As Bonecas/The Dolls) ==
- Branquinha (A boneca de louça)/Little Light-skinned Girl (The Porcelain Doll)
- Moreninha (A boneca de massa)/Little Dark-skinned Girl (The Papier-mâché Doll)
- Caboclinha (A boneca de barro)/Little Mestizo Girl (The Clay Doll)
- Mulatinha (A boneca de borracha)/Little Mulatto Girl (The Rubber Doll)
- Negrinha (A boneca de pau)/Little Black Girl (The Wooden Doll)
- A pobrezinha (A boneca de trapo)/The Little Poor Girl (The Rag Doll)
- O polichinelo/Punch
- A bruxa (A boneca de pano)/Witch (The Cloth Doll)

== Book 2 (Os Bichinhos/The Little Animals) ==
- A baratinha de papel (The Little Paper Bug)
- A gatinha de papelão (The Little Cardboard Cat)
- O camundongo de massa (The Little Toy Mouse)
- O cachorrinho de borracha (The Little Rubber Dog)
- O cavalinho de pau (The Little Wooden Horse)
- O boizinho de chumbo (The Little Lead Ox)
- O passarinho de pano (The Little Cloth Bird)
- O ursinho de algodão (The Little Cotton Bear)
- O lobozinho de vidro (The Little Glass Wolf)

== Book 3 (Esportes/Sports) ==
- Gude (Marbles)
- Diabolô (Diabolo)
- Bilboquê (Ball in a Cup)
- Peteca (Shuttlecock)
- Pião (Top)
- Futebol (Football)
- Jogo de bolas (Ball Game)
- Soldado de chumbo (Lead Soldier)
- Capoeiragem (Capoeira)
