= Henri Martelli =

French composer (1895–1980)

Henri Martelli (25 February 1895 – 15 July 1980) was a 20th-century French composer.

== Biography ==
Born in Santa Fe, Argentina and raised in Bastia, Martelli was student of Charles-Marie Widor and Georges Caussade at the Conservatoire de Paris. In 1919, he graduated in law from Université de Paris. He was director of chamber music programmes on the radio from 1940 to 1944, secretary of the Société Nationale de Musique and president of the French section of the ISCM in 1953. He wrote – in a neoclassical style – many chamber music works as well as lyrical and radio works.

He died in Paris aged 85.

== Works ==
=== Incidental music ===
- 1923: La Chanson de Roland, opera (reworked 1962-63; Paris, 13 April 1967)
- 1930: La Bouteille de Panurge, ballet (Paris, 24 February 1937)
- 1951: Les Hommes de sable, ballet
- 1958: Le Major Cravachon, opéra bouffe (Radiodiffusion française, 14 June 1959)

=== Orchestral music ===
- 1921: Rondo (1921)
- 1922: Sarabande, Scherzo et Final
- 1922: Divertissement sarrazin
- 1928: Bas-reliefs assyriens, Op. 27
- 1931: Concerto for orchestra, Op. 31
- 1938: Violin Concerto No. 1
- 1949: Piano Concerto
- 1953: Symphony No. 1, for strings
- 1956: Symphony No. 2, for strings
- 1956: Double Concerto for clarinet and bassoon
- 1957: Symphonie No. 3, for large orchestra
- 1957: Le Radeau de la Méduse, symphonic poem
- 1966: Rhapsodie, for cello and orchestra
- 1970: Concerto for oboe and orchestra

=== Chamber music ===
- Quatre pièces pour guitare, Op. 32
- 1933: String Quartet No. 1
- 1935: Piano Trio
- 1936: Violin Sonata
- 1942: Flute Sonata
- 1944: String Quartet No. 2
- 1946: Sept duos, for violin and harp
- 1947: Fantasiestück, Op. 67, for flute and piano (dedicated to Claude Delvincourt, director of the Paris Conservatory)
- 1948: Cinq Études-Caprices, Op. 58, for flute and piano (dedicated to Jean Pierre Rampal)
- 1951: Trio, for flute, cello and piano
- 1956: Divertissement Op. 86, for harp (dedicated to Lily Laskine)
- 1959: Viola Sonata
- 1962: Concertstück, for viola and piano

=== Music for piano ===
- 1941: Cinq danses

== Sources ==
- Marc Vignal Dictionnaire de la musique française, Larousse
