= Lonely Child (Vivier) =

Composition by Claude Vivier

Lonely Child is a piece for soprano and orchestra by Claude Vivier, written in 1980. It is arguably his most well-known piece, and is considered a hallmark composition in the genre of spectral music.
