= Pli selon pli =

Musical composition for soprano and orchestra by Pierre Boulez

- Portrait de Mallarmé
- Composition for voice and orchestra by Pierre Boulez
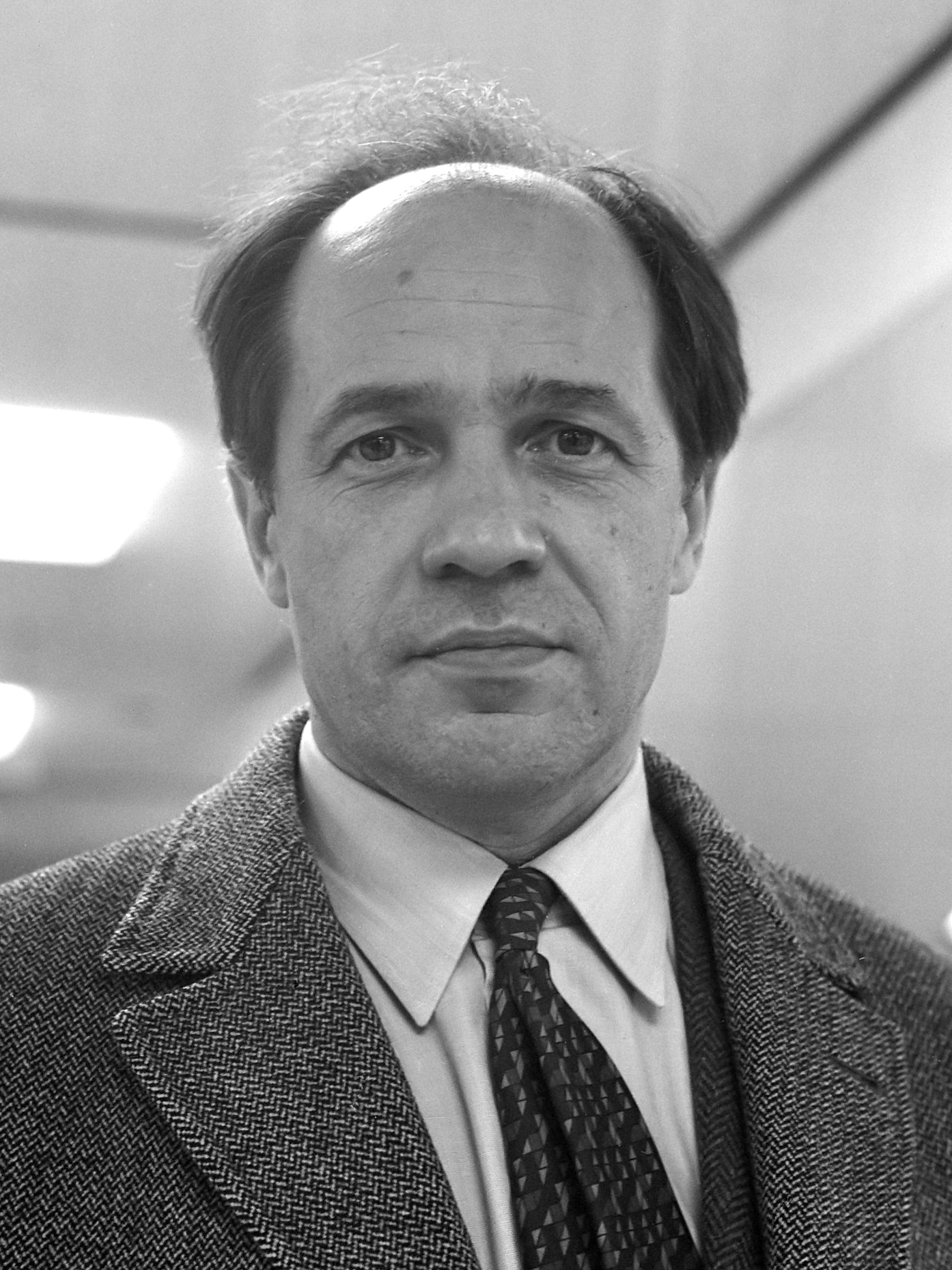
- The composer in 1968
- English: Fold by Fold
- Text: Sonnets by Stéphane Mallarmé
- Language: French
- Performed: 1960: Baden-Baden
- Movements: 5
- Scoring: soprano; orchestra

Pli selon pli (Fold by fold) is a piece of classical music by the French composer Pierre Boulez. It carries the subtitle Portrait de Mallarmé (Portrait of Mallarmé). It is scored for a solo soprano and orchestra and uses the texts of three sonnets of French symbolist poet Stéphane Mallarmé and single lines from two of his other poems. At over an hour, it is Boulez's longest work.

== Movements and poems ==
The composition is in five movements, the first and last using a line from a Mallarmé poem, the three middle movements using the entire text of a Mallarmé sonnet. The movements and their associated poems are:

1. Don – "Don du poème"
2. Improvisation I sur Mallarmé – "Le vierge, le vivace et le bel aujourd'hui"
3. Improvisation II sur Mallarmé – "Une dentelle s'abolit"
4. Improvisation III sur Mallarmé – "A la nue accablante tu"
5. Tombeau – the poem of the same name

The title is taken from yet another Mallarmé poem, Remémoration d'amis belges, in which the poet describes how a mist that covers the city of Bruges gradually disappears:

Comme furtive d'elle et visible je sens
Que se dévêt pli selon pli la pierre veuve

Translation:

As if by stealth and visible I sense
That fold by fold the widowed stone unrobes itself

Boulez said: "So, fold by fold, as the five movements develop, a portrait of Mallarmé is revealed."

Boulez uses the five Mallarmé poems in chronological order, beginning with the early "Don du poème" of 1865 in the first movement and continuing to the late "Tombeau" of 1897 in the last. The work thus represents a life of Mallarmé, and it concludes with the word "mort" (death), the only clearly intelligible word of the last movement. The first movement uses just the first line of "Don du poème" and the last movement just the last line of "Tombeau". Describing the setting of these texts, a critic wrote that in the first and last movements "the voice is hardly present – though significant when it is" and that the voice "function[s] as an instrumental timbre in its own right." Of the work as a whole wrote: "The idea of 'setting' a text, however, in the conventional sense, is not adopted here. Rather, the soprano is an integral part of the instrumental fabric and only rarely are specific words or phrases 'illustrated' musically in the traditional manner."

The 1st chord of the “Don” movement is used in Luciano Berio’s collage piece Sinfonia.

== Conception and composition ==
Boulez composed Improvisations I and II, for soprano and percussion ensemble, in 1957. In 1959 he wrote Improvisation III for soprano, instrumental ensemble and a large group of percussion, as well as Tombeau, for soprano and large orchestra. In 1960, he completed Don in a version for soprano and piano. In 1962, he rescored this movement for soprano and orchestra, and also rescored Improvisation I, completing the work in its initial form.

As he did with so many of his compositions, Boulez returned to the work and revised it. In the 1980s, he rewrote Don and revised Improvisation III. In both cases, Boulez removed some of the flexibility he had previously allowed the performers in determining the order in which to play the sections of these movements.

Improvisation II contrasts "three different kinds of sounds—fixed pitch, partially pitched, and unpitched ('noise')".

== The music ==
- Don (1962 version)
  - 3 flutes (II and II doubling on piccolo), alto flute in G, oboe (English horn), E-flat clarinet, clarinet in A, bass clarinet in B-flat, bassoon
  - 4 horns in F, trumpet in D, trumpet in C, tenor trombone, bass trombone, contrabass trombone
  - 3 harps, piano, celesta, mandolin, guitar – guitar and mandolin are both amplified
  - timpanist and 6 percussionists
  - strings
- version nouvelle 1989
  - 4 flutes (3 flutes and alto flute), oboe, clarinet, E-flat clarinet, bass clarinet, bassoon
  - 4 horns in F, trumpet in D, trumpet in C, tenor trombone, bass trombone, contrabass trombone
  - mandolin, guitar (both amplified)
  - 7 percussionists playing: Chinese cymbals, snare drum, glockenspiel, chimes, crotales, 2 vibraphones, 3 bongos, 2 xylophones, 2 bell plates, 3 pr claves, 2 pr maracas, 5 suspended cymbals, 6 Almglocken, 3 gongs, 2 tam-tams, 2 bass drums, timpani
  - 3 harps, piano, celesta
  - 4 violins, 4 violas, 5 cellos, 3 double basses
- Improvisation I "Le vierge, le vivace et le bel aujourd'hui" (1957 version)
  - soprano
  - harp
  - vibraphone
  - 4 percussionists: 2 blocks of metal, 2 tam-tams, large bass drum; 1 pair of high crotales, 2 small bass drums; 1 pair of deep crotales, 1 deep bass drum; 3 suspended cymbals, 3 gongs
- version nouvelle 1989
  - 2 flutes (both doubling on piccolos), E-flat clarinet, clarinet in A), 2 alto saxophones in E-flat
  - 4 horns in F
  - 8 percussionists: chimes, xylophone, tenor drum, bass drum, 2 vibraphones, 2 cowbells, 2 tam-tams, 6 bongos, 2 snare drums, tuned Almglocken (g>c’’), 3 gongs, 2 suspended cymbals, 6 crotales (indefinite pitch), optional glockenspiel
  - 3 harps, mandolin, guitar
  - 8 violas, 6 double basses
- Improvisation II "Une dentelle s'abolit"
  - soprano, harp, vibraphone, tubular bells, piano, celesta, 4 percussionists: suspended cymbals, gong, vibraphone, chimes, crotales, 4 pr maracas, 3 pr claves, 2 tam-tams
- Improvisation III "À la nue accablante tu"
  - 3 flutes (2nd and 3rd doubling on piccolo), alto flute in G (doubling on piccolo)
  - tenor trombone
  - 7 percussionists: claves, congas, glockenspiel, chimes, Chinese cymbals, bass drum, 2 xylophones (4 hands), bell plate, 6 Almglocken, 5 bongos
  - 3 harps (special tuning required for the two of them), celesta, mandolin, guitar
  - 5 cellos, 3 double basses
- Tombeau
  - 2 flutes (1st doubling on piccolo), English horn, E-flat clarinet, clarinet in A, bass clarinet in B-flat, bassoon
  - horn, trumpet in D, trumpet in C, tenor trombone, bass trombone, contrabass trombone
  - 2 harps, piano, guitar, vibraphone, tubular bells, xylophone, bass drum (playing the vibraphone and timbales), gongs (playing the tom-tom and plate bells)
  - 4 violins, 4 violas, 2 cellos, 2 double basses

The piece has a relatively simple large-scale dynamic shape: the outer movements are written for large ensembles, the second and fourth movements for smaller groups, and the central third movement uses just ten instrumentalists and the soprano. The general dynamic is loudest at the work's opening and closing and most quiet in the middle. The first movement opens with a loud sound which immediately becomes quiet and the last closes with a rapid crescendo. In fact the last movement "is consumed by a vast and monolithic crescendo that slowly and steadily gains in textural and contrapuntal complexity as its unfolds before breaking off after some fifteen minutes: it is the monolithic inexorability of its unfolding over so vast an expanse of time that makes the experience of Tombeau so gripping".

The symmetrical structure of the work is readily apparent not only in its dynamics, but in the use of fragments in the opening and closing sections and the disposition of instruments. The work opens and closes with the same chord.

The composition also includes instances of tone painting, as in the first movement where "fog and the hovering characteristic of fog are suggested by the long soft roll on the suspended cymbals that underlies much of the movement, the sudden motion of denser thickets of fog in a gust of wind by adding other rolls to the suspended cymbal roll".

According to one critic, "[Boulez's] works inhabit their own special soundworld". In Pli selon Pli he groups instruments in atypical ways. For example, "The customary string section is not used for lyrical, cantabile melodies, but rather for sounds such as tremolos 'snapped' pizzicati and other quasi-percussive effects." At times, "Three harps, mandolin and guitar are added to two pianos to form a plucked/struck string group." Bells are used so as to avoid any association with religious ceremony. Instead "their combination with other metal percussion creates for a unique sonority – quite peculiar to itself." He described the orchestration as "extraordinarily inventive, with sometimes a completely different timbre between one phrase – or even note – and the next." John Rockwell recognized both the work's innovations and its sources: "as evident as the novelty of these pieces are their debts to other composers and other cultures–the Expressionist tensions of Schoenberg, the exuberant racket of Chinese percussion, above all the piercing aviary of Messiaen. Which is not to deny Mr. Boulez his eagerly sought-after originality, merely to place it in context."

The published score of the original version was printed with some sections in black, green, blue, violet and red to illustrate, according to a Pierpont Morgan Library exhibition catalog, "the different degrees of rigor with which its various parts are to be realized in performance". The colors did not appear in later versions.

== Performance history ==
Boulez conducted the Southwest German Radio Symphony Orchestra (Baden-Baden) in the world premiere of Pli selon Pli in 1960. According to Judith Crispin, the complex rhythms of Pli selon Pli, which are "ostensibly" required by compositional concerns, were designed to "showcase the conducting skills of the composer", his "virtuosic display".

Maurice Béjart choreographed a ballet using three movements: "Don", "Improvisation III", and "Tombeau".

The first New York performance of all five movements occurred in 1978 in Carnegie Hall by the Contemporary Chamber Ensemble led by Arthur Weisberg.

Boulez sometimes conducted partial performances. For example, he led the New York Philharmonic in performances of the first two "Improvisations" in 1974 and of the three "Improvisations" in 1986.

== Reception ==
In 1970 a critic reviewing the work's first recording wrote that Pli selon Pli had for years been on "a mission" to serve as "a showpiece of the 'advanced' idiom" and judged that "The ground it covers and even breaks qualifies it well ... as such an emissary". He wrote:

No-one who has come to terms with Messiaen will find this music difficult: for the most part it is thought out in great Brucknerian instrumental layers, and in place of thematic treatment there are rhymes, rhythmic puns and some simple if un-Mallarméan gesturings. Above all there is the sumptuousness of a highly fastidious orchestral ear.

In 1974, when Boulez conducted the New York Philharmonic in the first two "Improvisations" at one of a series of "Rug Concerts" that attracted in notably young audience, the audience "stood and cheered" and brought the conductor and soloist back for four additional bows.

In 1984, Paul Griffiths wrote that the work was "now well established as a major monument to that strange movement known as the 'avant garde': composed between 1957 and 1962, it is indeed a testimony to that movement's heyday". Andrew Porter said the work deserved to be presented annually in New York. Edward Rothstein called it "a touchstone in postwar composition".

In 1986, New York Times critic John Rockwell withheld judgment: "how posterity will value these scores, so colorful yet so insistently, self-contentedly enigmatic, remains to be seen", though he once wrote that the composition demonstrated Boulez's "wonderfully acute sense of aural color". In 1991, his colleague Donal Henahan, who had long been hostile to the work, (Note: "a kind of classical distancing from overt show of emotions ... chilly worlds of sound ... with all the richness that this sound palette offers, Pli selon Pli still manages to be monotonous ... this score goes even beyond the norm in its ability to make the mind wander.") used Pli selon Pli as an exemplar of the failure of contemporary music to engage the listener's emotions:

What does it mean to say that a large-scale work like Mr. Boulez's 29-year-old "Pli Selon Pli" shrinks to insignificance in comparison with almost any Schubert song or Chopin prelude? Nothing, really. In the second half of the 20th century, we demand a different kind of genius of our geniuses. Mr. Boulez's works serve his listeners most usefully by isolating them momentarily from the human feelings that an "Erlkönig", let alone a "Winterreise", can force to the surface. The excerpts from "Pli Selon Pli" that Mr. Boulez conducted at Carnegie Hall confronted the listener in no such embarrassing manner: they dealt with the Mallarme texts antiseptically, like a rubber-gloved dental technician. This sort of expressively uncontaminated art is a thing of its time and therefore in a sense legitimate. It may be described as the 'great' music of a century in its death throes.

A Gramophone review of the only recording of the final version, which it called "the composer’s definitive conception of the work as enhanced chamber music", said that "there can be no such thing as a sanitised‚ lushly comforting Pli selon Pli. The music remains Boulez's most extended engagement with the modernist aesthetic‚ especially in the concluding "Tombeau"‚ which so determinedly resists that very continuity and coherent cumulation to which it seems to aspire". It described the composition as "a work which sums up the composer's vision of art and life in the years before he found his way to a viable electroacoustic technique and a more stable view of musical structure." Another assessment from early in the 21st century called Pli selon Pli Boulez's "perhaps greatest score", which "carved out a particular sound, ethos, and way of measuring musical time that no work–by Boulez or anyone else–has since followed up, let alone equaled."

Discussing the work in 2013, composer and conductor Matthias Pintscher said:

In Pli selon pli, the sonorities are exquisite, and they have really also influenced my own writing. Thanks to the amazing metallic sounds Boulez uses – harps, percussion, celeste, the most excessive writing for tubular bells that had ever been heard in music history – he creates an illusion of sustaining, sostenuto sounds. The resonance of all those metallic instruments has intrigued me since I was very young. Mallarmé's words ... allow our imaginations to create our own experiences and associations.... Boulez takes us by the hand and leads us into this astonishingly beautiful garden and we are free to walk around it in any direction we choose.... And this work is emotionally very strong, because it's great music! It's like Ravel, in that it conveys such a strong and powerful emotion under all these layers of thought and pristine construction.... It leaves you completely emotionally torn, asking questions – what condition are we in? How do we go forward? We are so shaken by it, and now it's our turn to move on, or to try to. It's overwhelming.

Composer and pianist Anthony Cheung said that "The use of percussion in Pli selon pli, the Improvisations sur Mallarmé, the exotic, heightened resonance of that world, has been particularly influential for me."

== Recordings ==
The work has been recorded three times: in 1969 with soprano Halina Łukomska and the BBC Symphony Orchestra; in 1981 with soprano Phyllis Bryn-Julson and the same orchestra; and in 2000 with soprano Christine Schäfer and the Ensemble InterContemporain. Boulez conducted all three recordings. Only the third recording presents the work in its final form. In 1983, comparing the first two recordings, Paul Griffiths noted the latter's markedly longer playing times and wrote: "Boulez in 1969 appears to have been excited with a work that was still new; in 1981 he was looking back on it with affection, certainly, but perhaps too with a faint sense of regret."
