= String Quartet (Webern) =

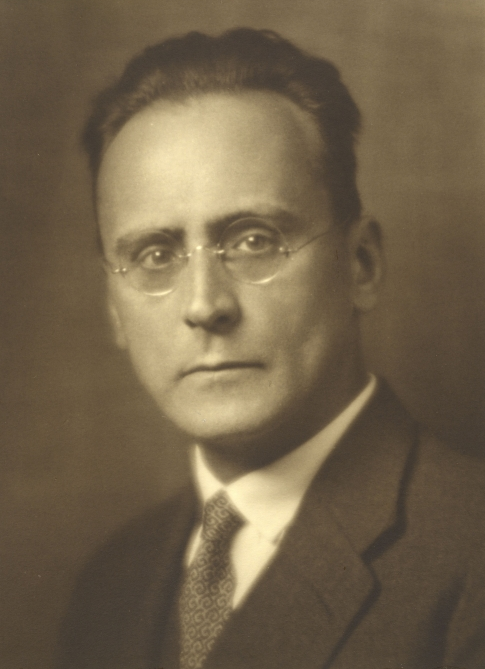
Webern, 1927, portrait by Georg Fayer

The String Quartet, Op. 28, by Anton Webern is written for the standard string quartet group of two violins, viola and cello. It was the last piece of chamber music that Webern wrote (his other late works include two cantatas Op. 29/31 and the Variations for Orchestra, Op. 30).

The work was initially planned in November 1936 and was premiered at the Coolidge Festival in Pittsfield, Massachusetts, on September 22, 1938, in response to a commission that year from Elizabeth Sprague Coolidge. When Webern sent the score of the piece to Coolidge, he accompanied it with a letter saying that the piece was "purely lyrical" and comparing it to the two and three movement piano sonatas of Ludwig van Beethoven.

The piece was first published in 1939 by Boosey & Hawkes, and was the last of Webern's works to be published in his lifetime. In 1955, another edition appeared from Universal Edition.

== Music ==
It is in three movements:

1. Mässig (Moderately), variation form.
2. Gemächlich (Leisurely), ternary form (ABA), the outer parts being a four-part canon with all the notes the same length (fluctuations in tempo aside).
3. Sehr fliessend (Very flowing), a freer movement with numerous changes in texture and mood. In a letter to Erwin Stein, Webern described the middle part of this movement as a fugue.

The string quartet is atonal and uses twelve-tone technique. The tone row on which the piece is based (B♭, A, C, B, D♯, E, C♯, D, G♭, F, A♭, G) is based on the BACH motif (B♭, A, C, B♮) and is composed of three tetrachords:

The first four notes of the row are the BACH motif itself, followed by its inversion, followed by same motif transposed up a minor sixth. A special property of this row is that its inversion (G, A♭, F, G♭, D, C♯, E, D♯, B, C, A, B♭) is equivalent to its retrograde.
