= Quintet =

Group containing five members

A quintet is a group containing five members. It is commonly associated with musical groups, such as a string quintet, or a group of five singers, but can be applied to any situation where five similar or related objects are considered a single unit.

== Overview ==
In classical instrumental music, any additional instrument (such as a piano, clarinet, oboe, etc.) joined to the usual string quartet (two violins, a viola, and a cello), gives the resulting ensemble its name, such as "piano quintet", "clarinet quintet", etc. A piece of music written for such a group is similarly named.

The standard wind quintet consists of one player each on flute, oboe, clarinet, bassoon, and horn, while the standard brass quintet has two trumpets, horn, trombone, and tuba. Other combinations are sometimes found, however.

In jazz music, a quintet is group of five players, usually consisting of two soloing instruments, such as guitar, trumpet, saxophone, clarinet, flute or trombone, in addition to those of the traditional jazz trio or rhythm section – piano, double bass, drums.

In some modern bands there are quintets formed from the same family of instruments with various voices, as an all-brass ensemble, or all saxophones, in soprano, alto, baritone, and bass, and sometimes contrabass.

== Notable classical music ==
- Luigi Boccherini: String Quintet in E major, Op. 11, No. 5 (1775)
- Wolfgang Amadeus Mozart: Quintet for Piano and Winds, K. 452 (1784), Clarinet Quintet, K. 581 (1789)
- Franz Schubert: Trout Quintet in A major, D. 667 (1819), String Quintet in C major, Op. 163 (D. 956, 1828)
- Robert Schumann: Piano Quintet in E-flat, Op. 44 (1842)
- Johannes Brahms: Piano Quintet in F minor, Op. 34 (1862); String Quintet No. 1 in F major, Op. 88 (1882); Clarinet Quintet in B minor, Op. 115 (1891)
- Antonín Dvořák: Piano Quintet No. 1, Op.5 (1872); Piano Quintet No. 2 (1887); String Quintet No. 3 (1893)
- Anton Bruckner: String Quintet in F major (1879)
- Paul Hindemith: Kleine Kammermusik, Op. 24, No. 2 (1922)
- Carl Nielsen: Wind Quintet (1922)
- Arnold Schoenberg: Wind Quintet, Op. 26 (1923–24)
- Heitor Villa-Lobos: Quinteto (em forma de chôros) (1928)
- Dmitri Shostakovich: Piano Quintet in G minor, Op. 57 (1940)
- Karlheinz Stockhausen: Zeitmaße (1955–56)
- George Perle: Wind Quintet No. 4 (1984–85)
