= Piano quintet =

Form of chamber music

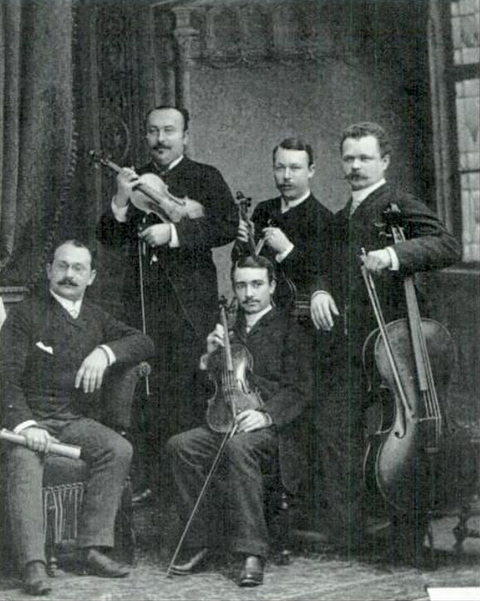
The Swiss piano quintet: sitting Willy Rehberg (piano) and Rigo (viola), standing Louis Rey (first violin), Emile Rey (second violin) and Adolphe Rehberg (cello), c. 1900.

In classical music, a piano quintet is a work of chamber music written for piano and four other instruments, most commonly (since 1842) a string quartet (i.e., two violins, viola, and cello). The term also refers to the group of musicians that plays a piano quintet. The genre flourished during the nineteenth century.

Until the middle of the nineteenth century, most piano quintets were scored for piano, violin, viola, cello, and double bass. Following the success of Robert Schumann's Piano Quintet in E♭ major, Op. 44 in 1842, which paired the piano with a string quartet, composers increasingly adopted Schumann's instrumentation, and it was this form of the piano quintet that dominated during the second half of the nineteenth century and into the twentieth century.

Among the best known and most frequently performed piano quintets, aside from Schumann's, are Schubert's Trout quintet and the piano quintets of Johannes Brahms, César Franck, Antonín Dvořák and Dmitri Shostakovich.

== The piano quintet before 1842 ==
While the related chamber music genres of the piano trio and piano quartet were established in the eighteenth century by Mozart and others, the piano quintet did not come into its own until the nineteenth century. Its roots extend into the late Classical period, when piano concertos were sometimes transcribed for piano with string quartet accompaniment.

Although Luigi Boccherini composed quintets for piano and string quartet, before 1842 it was more common for the piano to be joined by violin, viola, cello and double bass. Among the best known quintets for this combination of instruments are Franz Schubert's "Trout" Quintet in A major (1819) and Johann Nepomuk Hummel's Piano Quintet in E♭ minor, Op.87 (1802). Other piano quintets using this instrumentation were composed by Jan Ladislav Dussek (1799), Ferdinand Ries (1817), Johann Baptist Cramer (1825, 1832), Henri Jean Rigel (1826), Johann Peter Pixis (ca.1827), Franz Limmer (1832), Louise Farrenc (1839, 1840), and George Onslow (1846, 1848, 1849).

Mozart (in 1784) and Ludwig van Beethoven (in 1796) each composed a quintet for piano and winds, scored for piano, oboe, clarinet, horn, and bassoon, that are sometimes referred to as piano quintets.

== Schumann and the Romantic piano quintet ==
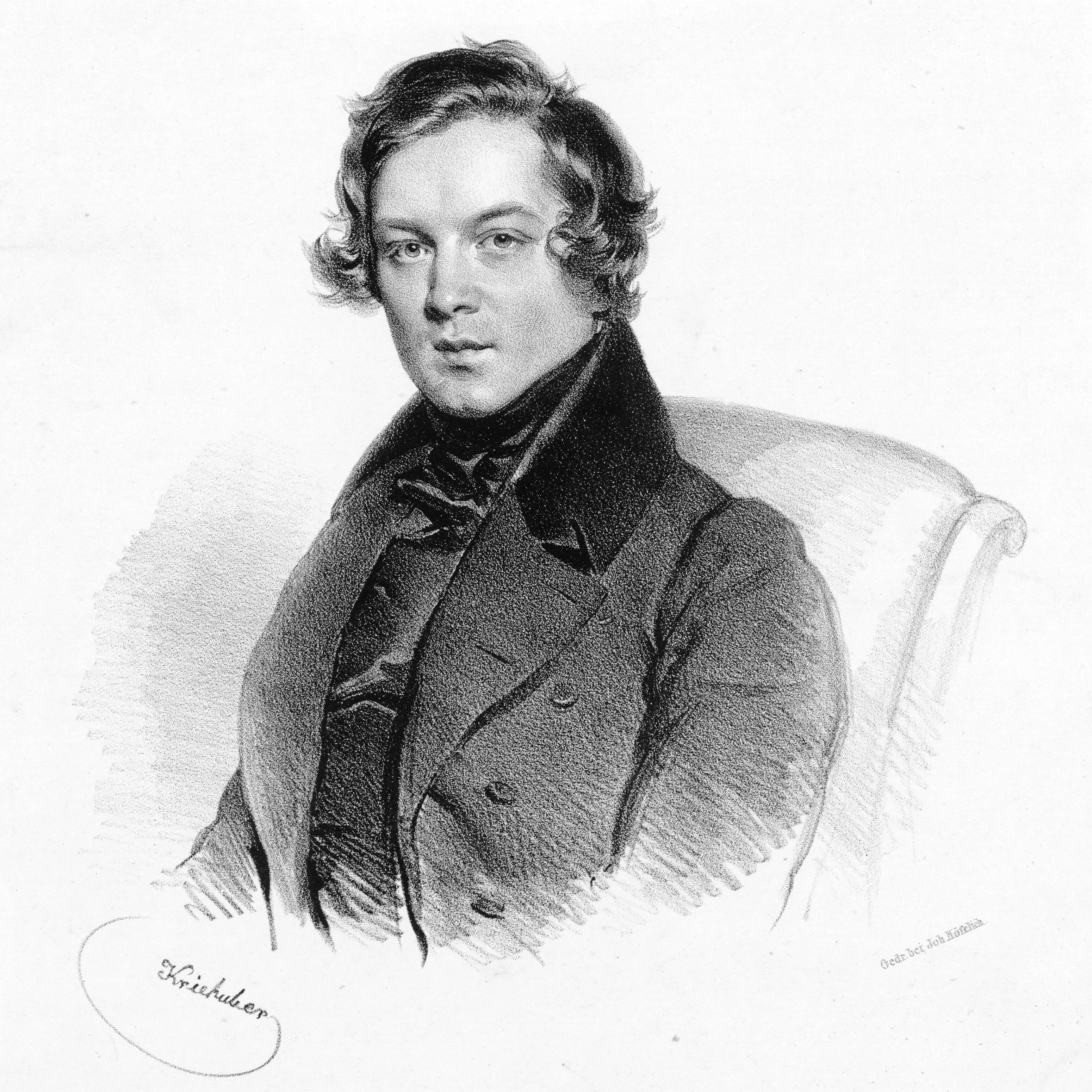
Robert Schumann, lithograph by Josef Kriehuber, in 1839, three years before the composition of his piano quintet.

In the middle of the 19th century, Robert Schumann's Piano Quintet in E♭ major, Op. 44 (1842), composed for piano with string quartet, helped establish that combination of instruments as the typical model for the piano quintet. Schumann's choice of scoring reflected developments in musical performance and instrumental design.

By midcentury, the string quartet was regarded as the most prestigious and important chamber music genre, while advances in the design of the piano had expanded its power and dynamic range. Bringing the piano and string quartet together, Schumann's piano quintet took full advantage of the expressive possibilities of these forces in combination, alternating conversational passages between the five instruments with passages in which the combined forces of the strings are massed against the piano. In Schumann's hands, the piano quintet became a genre "suspended between private and public spheres" alternating between "quasi-symphonic and more properly chamber-like elements"—well suited to an era when chamber music was increasingly being performed in large concert halls rather than at private gatherings in intimate spaces.

Schumann's quintet helped establish the piano quintet as a significant chamber music genre during the Romantic period in classical music. It was immediately acclaimed and widely imitated. Johannes Brahms, for example, was persuaded by Clara Schumann (who had played the piano part in the first public performance of her husband's piano quintet) to rework a sonata for two pianos as a piano quintet. The result, the Piano Quintet in F minor (1864), is one of the most frequently performed works of the genre.

Subsequent compositions such as César Franck's Piano Quintet in F minor (1879) and Antonín Dvořák's Piano Quintet #2 in A major, Op. 81 (1887) further solidified the genre as a "vehicle for Romantic expression."

== 20th century ==
In the twentieth century, the piano quintet repertoire was expanded with contributions by composers such as Béla Bartók, Sergei Taneyev, Louis Vierne, Edward Elgar, Amy Beach, Gabriel Fauré, Dmitri Shostakovich, and Mieczysław Weinberg. However, unlike the string quartet, which remained an important chamber music genre for musical experimentation, the piano quintet came to acquire "a somewhat conservative profile, far from major developments" in musical expression.

== List of compositions for piano quintet ==
The following is a partial list of compositions for piano quintet. All works are scored for piano and string quartet unless otherwise noted.

=== Before 1800 ===
- Wolfgang Amadeus Mozart
  - Piano Quintet in E♭ major, K. 452 (for piano, oboe, clarinet, horn, and bassoon; 1784)
- Ludwig van Beethoven
  - Piano Quintet in E♭ major, Op. 16 (for piano, oboe, clarinet, horn, and bassoon; 1796)
- Franz Ignaz von Beecke
  - Piano Quintet in A minor (between 1770 and 1780)
- Luigi Boccherini
  - Piano Quintet Op. 56 No.1 in E minor, G 407
  - Piano Quintet Op. 56 No.2 in F major, G 408
  - Piano Quintet Op. 56 No.3 in C major, G 409
  - Piano Quintet Op. 56 No.4 in E♭ major, G 410
  - Piano Quintet Op. 56 No.5 in D major, G 411
  - Piano Quintet Op. 56 No.6 in A minor, G 412
  - Piano Quintet Op. 57 No.1 in A major, G 413
  - Piano Quintet Op. 57 No.2 in B♭ major, G 414
  - Piano Quintet Op. 57 No.3 in E minor, G 415
  - Piano Quintet Op. 57 No.4 in D minor, G 416
  - Piano Quintet Op. 57 No.5 in E major, G 417
  - Piano Quintet Op. 57 No.6 in C major, G 418
- Jan Ladislav Dussek
  - Piano Quintet in F minor, Op. 41 (for piano, violin, viola, cello, and double bass; 1799)

=== 19th century ===
- Alexander Alyabyev
  - Piano Quintet No. 1 in E♭ major
- Elfrida Andrée
  - Piano Quintet in E minor (1865)
- Franz Berwald
  - Piano Quintet No. 1 in C minor (1853)
  - Piano Quintet No. 2 in A major (1857)
- Sandro Blumenthal
  - Piano Quintet No. 1 in D major, Op. 2 (publ. 1900)
  - Piano Quintet No. 2 in G major, Op. 4 (publ. 1900)
- João Domingos Bomtempo (for most of the quintets some parts are lost)
  - 3 Piano Quintets, B67-69
  - 3 Piano Quintets, B70-72
  - Piano Quintet in E major, B73
  - Piano Quintet in D minor, B74
  - Piano Quintet in E♭ major Op. 16 (pub. 1813 or 1814)
- Alexander Borodin
  - Piano Quintet in C minor (1862)
- Johannes Brahms
  - Piano Quintet in F minor, Op. 34 (1864)
- Max Bruch
  - Piano Quintet in G minor Op. Post. (1886)
- Alexis Castillon de Saint-Victor
  - Piano Quintet in E♭ major Op. 1 (1864)
- George Whitefield Chadwick
  - Piano Quintet in E♭ major (1887)
- Camille Chevillard
  - Piano Quintet in E♭ minor Op. 1 (1882)
- Samuel Coleridge-Taylor
  - Piano Quintet in G minor, Op. 1 (1893)
- Johann Baptist Cramer
  - Piano Quintet in B♭ major, Op. 79 (for piano, violin, viola, cello, and double bass)
- Carl Czerny
  - Variations on "Gott erhalte Franz den Kaiser", Op. 73 (1824)
  - Rondino on a Theme of Auber for Piano Quintet, Op. 127 (c. 1826)
  - Fantaisie sur themes suisses et tiroliens, Op.162 (c. 1825)
  - Grandes variations di bravura on 'Fra Diavolo', Op. 232 (c. 1830)
- Ernő Dohnányi
  - Piano Quintet No. 1, Op. 1 (1895)
  - Piano Quintet No. 2, Op. 26 (1914)
- Felix Draeseke
  - Piano Quintet in B♭ major, Op. 48, (for piano, violin, viola, cello, and horn; 1888)
- Antonín Dvořák
  - Piano Quintet No. 1 in A major, Op. 5 (1872)
  - Piano Quintet No. 2 in A major, Op. 81 (1887)
- Louise Farrenc
  - Piano Quintet No. 1 in A minor, Op. 30 (for piano, violin, viola, cello, and double bass; 1839)
  - Piano Quintet No. 2 in E major, Op. 31 (for piano, violin, viola, cello, and double bass; 1840)
- Zdeněk Fibich
  - Piano Quintet in D major, Op. 42, (for piano, violin, clarinet, horn, and cello 1893)
- John Field
  - Piano Quintet in A♭ major, H. 34 (around 1815)
- Arthur Foote
  - Piano Quintet in A minor, Op. 38 (1897, publ. 1898)
- César Franck
  - Piano Quintet in F minor, M. 7 (1879)
- Eduard Franck
  - Piano Quintet in D major, op. 45 (1882)
- Carl Frühling
  - Piano Quintet in F♯ minor, Op. 30 (1892)
- Friedrich Gernsheim
  - Piano Quintet no. 1 in D minor, op. 35
  - Piano Quintet no. 2 in B minor, op. 63, c. 1897
- Hermann Goetz
  - Piano Quintet in C minor, Op. 16 (for piano, violin, viola, cello, and double bass; 1874)
- Karl Goldmark
  - Piano Quintet No. 1 in B♭ major, Op. 30 (1879)
  - Piano Quintet No. 2 in C♯ minor, Op. 54 (1914?5? published 1916)
- Théodore Gouvy
  - Piano Quintet in A major Op. 24 (1859)
- Enrique Granados
  - Piano Quintet in G minor, Op. 49 (1894)
- Emil Hartmann
  - Piano Quintet in G minor, Op. 5 (1865)
- Peter Arnold Heise
  - Piano Quintet in F major (1869)
- Heinrich von Herzogenberg
  - Piano Quintet in C major, Op. 17 (1876)
- Hans Huber
  - Piano Quintet No.1 in G minor, Op.111 (1896)
- Johann Nepomuk Hummel
  - Piano Quintet in E♭ minor, Op. 87 (for piano, violin, viola, cello, and double bass; composed 1802, published 1822)
  - Piano Quintet in D minor, Op. 74 (transcribed for piano, violin, viola, cello, and double bass from the Op. 74 Septet; 1816)
- Engelbert Humperdinck
  - Piano Quintet in G major (1875)
- Salomon Jadassohn
  - Piano Quintet No. 1 in C minor, Op. 70 (1883)
  - Piano Quintet No. 2 in F major, Op.76 (1884)
  - Piano Quintet No. 3 in G minor, Op.126 (1895)
- Friedrich Kiel
  - Piano Quintet No. 1 in A major, Op. 75 (1874)
  - Piano Quintet No. 2 in c minor, Op. 76 (1874)
- August Klughardt
  - Piano quintet in G minor, Op. 43 (c. 1883)
- Hans von Koessler (1853–1926)
  - Piano Quintet in F major
- Josef Labor
  - Piano Quintet in E minor, Op. 3 (for piano, violin, viola, cello, and double bass, 1886)
  - Piano Quintet, Op. 11 (for piano, clarinet, violin, viola and cello, 1900)
- Édouard Lalo
  - Piano quintet in A♭ major ("Fantaisie-quintette" in 2 movements, 1862)
- Franz Limmer
  - Piano Quintet in D minor, Op. 13 (for piano, violin, viola, cello, and double bass; c. 1830)
- Giuseppe Martucci
  - Piano Quintet in C major, Op. 45 (1878)
- Vítězslav Novák
  - Piano Quintet in A minor, Op. 12 (1896)
- Józef Nowakowski
  - Piano Quintet No.1, Op.10 (1833)
  - Piano Quintet No.2 in E♭ major, Op.17 (1833)
- George Onslow
  - Piano Quintet in B minor, Op. 70 (for piano, violin, viola, cello, and double bass; 1846)
  - Piano Quintet in G major, Op. 76 (for piano, violin, viola, cello, and double bass; 1846)
  - Piano Quintet in B♭ major, Op. 79b (1849)
- Henrique Oswald
  - Piano Quintet in C major, Op. 18 (1895)
- Ebenezer Prout
  - Piano Quintet in G major, Op. 3 (published 1870)
- Prince Louis Ferdinand of Prussia
  - Piano Quintet in C minor, Op. 1 (publ. 1803)
- Joachim Raff
  - Piano Quintet in A minor, Op. 107 (1862)
  - Fantasie in G minor, Op. 207b (1877)
- Max Reger
  - Piano Quintet No. 1 in C minor (1897–98)
  - Piano Quintet No. 2 in C minor, Op. 64 (1901–02)
- Anton Reicha
  - Piano Quintet in C minor (1826)
- Carl Reinecke
  - Piano Quintet in A major, Op. 83 (by 1865)
- Josef Rheinberger
  - Piano Quintet in C major, Op. 114 (1878)
- Ferdinand Ries
  - Piano Quintet in B minor, Op. 74 (for piano, violin, viola, cello, and double bass; 1817)
- Nicolai Rimsky-Korsakov
  - Quintet in B♭ major for Piano and Winds (for piano, flute, clarinet, horn and bassoon; 1876)
- Anton Rubinstein
  - Piano Quintet in G minor, Op. 99 (1876?)
- Camille Saint-Saëns
  - Piano Quintet in A minor, op. 14 (1855)
- Franz Schubert
  - Piano Quintet in A major, D. 667 (popularly called the Trout Quintet; for piano, violin, viola, cello, and double bass; 1819)
- Georg Schumann
  - Piano Quintet No. 1 in E minor, Op. 18 (1898)
- Robert Schumann
  - Piano Quintet in E♭ major, Op. 44 (1842)
- Giovanni Sgambati
  - Piano Quintet No. 1 in F minor, Op. 4 (1866)
  - Piano Quintet No. 2 in B♭ major, Op. 5
- Jean Sibelius
  - Piano Quintet in G minor (1890)
- Christian Sinding
  - Piano Quintet in E minor. Op. 5 (1882–84)
- Louis Spohr
  - Piano Quintet No. 1. Op. 53
  - Piano Quintet No. 2, Op. 130 (1845)
- Charles Villiers Stanford
  - Piano Quintet in D minor, Op. 25 (1886)
- Josef Suk
  - Piano Quintet in G minor, Op. 8 (1893, rev. 1915)
- Ferdinand Thieriot
  - Piano Quintet in D major, Op. 20 (1869, rev. 1894)
- Ludwig Thuille
  - Piano Quintet in G minor, w/o Op. (1880)
  - Piano Quintet in E♭ major, Op. 20 (1901)
- Charles-Marie Widor
  - Piano Quintet No. 1 in D minor, Op. 7 (1868)
  - Piano Quintet No. 2 in D, Op. 68 (1894)
- Georges Martin Witkowski
  - Piano Quintet in B minor (1898)
- Juliusz Zarębski
  - Piano Quintet in G minor, Op. 34 (1885)

=== 1900 and after ===
==== A ====
- Rosalina Abejo
  - Piano Quintet (1966)
- Thomas Adès
  - Piano Quintet (2000)
- Samuel Adler
  - Piano Quintet (1999)
- Lidia Agabalian
  - Piano Quintet (1955)
- Miguel del Aguila
  - Clocks, for piano and string quartet (1998)
  - Charango Capriccioso, for piano and string quartet (2006)
  - Concierto en Tango, for piano and string quartet (2014)
- James Aikman
  - Piano Quintet (1997)
- Eleanor Alberga
  - Clouds (1984)
  - Piano Quintet (2007)
- Franco Alfano
  - Piano Quintet in A♭ major (1946)
- Frangiz Ali-Zadeh
  - Apsheron Quintet (2001)
  - Khazar Quintet (2006)
- Anton Arensky
  - Piano Quintet in D major, Op. 51 (1900)
- Elinor Armer
  - Piano Quintet (2012)
- Kurt Atterberg
  - Piano Quintet in C major, Op. 31a (1942, adapted from Symphony No. 6 of 1928)

==== B ====
- Grażyna Bacewicz
  - Piano Quintet No. 1 (1952)
  - Piano Quintet No. 2 (1965)
- Maria Bach
  - Piano Quintet (1930)
- Béla Bartók
  - Piano Quintet (1904)
- Arnold Bax
  - Piano Quintet in G minor (1915)
- Amy Beach
  - Piano Quintet in F♯ minor, Op. 67 (1907)
- Janet Beat
  - Concealed Imaginings for Piano Quintet (1997–1998)
  - Piano Quintet, The Dream Magus (2002)
- Karol Beffa
  - Destroy (2007)
  - Élévation (2010)
  - Ma joue ennemie (2010)
- Wilhelm Berger
  - Piano Quintet in F minor, Op. 95 (1904)
- Adolphe Biarent
  - Piano Quintet in D minor (1912)
- Ernest Bloch
  - Piano Quintet No. 1 (1923)
  - Piano Quintet No. 2 (1957)
- Nancy Bloomer Deussen
  - Pacific City for Piano Quintet (1990).
- Margaret Bonds
  - Piano Quintet in F major (1933)
- Nimrod Borenstein
  - Light and darkness opus 80 (2018)
- Frank Bridge
  - Piano Quintet in D minor (1905, revised 1912)
- Stephen Brown
  - Piano Quintet No. 1, Eulogy for Meghan Reid (2009)
  - Piano Quintet No. 2, White Light White Heat (2015)
- Alan Bush
  - Quintet for piano and string quartet, op.104 (1985)

==== C–E ====
- Charles Wakefield Cadman
  - Piano Quintet in G minor (1937)
- Elliott Carter
  - Quintet for Piano and String Quartet (1997)
  - Quintet for Piano and Winds (1991)
- Mario Castelnuovo-Tedesco
  - Piano Quintet No. 1 (publ. 1932)
  - Piano Quintet No. 2, Memories of the Tuscan Countryside, Op. 155 (1951)
- Georgy Catoire
  - Quintet for Piano and String Quartet, Op. 28 (1914)
- Jean Cras
  - Quintet for Piano and String Quartet in C major (1924)
- Cecilia Damström
  - Minna – Pictures from the life of Minna Canth, Op. 53 (2017)
- Arthur Dennington
  - Piano Quintet (1923)
- David Diamond
  - Quintet for Flute, Piano and String Trio (1937)
- Théodore Dubois
  - Quintet for Piano, Violin, Oboe (or Clarinet or 2nd Violin), Viola and Cello in F major (1905)
- Gabriel Dupont
  - Poème for Piano and String Quartet (1911)
- Lucien Durosoir
  - Piano Quintet in F major (1925)
- Katharine Emily Eggar
  - Piano Quintet in d minor (1906)
- Eleonora Eksanishvili
  - Piano Quintet (1945)
- Edward Elgar
  - Piano Quintet in A minor, Op. 84 (1918)
- George Enescu
  - Piano Quintet in A minor, Op. 29 (1940)

==== F–G ====
- Guido Alberto Fano
  - Piano Quintet in C major (1917)
- Arthur Farwell
  - Piano Quintet in e minor, Op. 103 (1937)
- Gabriel Fauré
  - Piano Quintet No. 1 in D minor, Op. 89 (completed 1905)
  - Piano Quintet No. 2 in C minor, Op. 115 (completed 1921)
- Morton Feldman
  - Piano and String Quartet (1985)
- Ross Lee Finney
  - Two piano quintets (no. 2 written 1961)
- Aloys Fleischmann
  - Piano Quintet (1938)
- Richard Flury
  - Piano quintet in A minor (1948)
- Jean Françaix
  - 8 Bagatelles (1932)
- Cheryl Frances-Hoad
  - Pay Close Attention (2009)
  - The Whole Earth Dances (2016) (for piano, violin, viola, cello and double-bass)
- Gabriela Lena Frank
  - Ghosts in the Dream Machine (2005)
  - Tres Homenajes: Compadrazgo (2007)
- Ignaz Friedman
  - Piano quintet in C minor (1918)
- James Friskin
  - Piano Quintet in C minor (1907)
  - Phantasy for Piano Quintet (1910)
- Beat Furrer
  - spur (1998)
- Wilhelm Furtwängler
  - Piano Quintet in C major (completed 1935)
- Vittorio Giannini
  - Piano Quintet (1932)
- Alberto Ginastera
  - Piano Quintet, Op. 29 (1963)
- Philip Glass
  - Piano Quintet (2018)
- Evgeny Golubev
  - Piano Quintet in D minor, Op. 20 (1938)
- Otar Gordeli
  - Piano Quintet (1950)
- Konstantia Gourzi
  - Vibrato 1 and Vibrato 2, Op. 38 (2010)
- Louis Gruenberg
  - Piano Quintet, Op. 13 (c. 1920)
- Jorge Grundman
  - The Toughest Decision of God for Piano Quintet (2012)
- Sofia Gubaidulina
  - Piano Quintet (1957)

==== H–K ====
- Henry Kimball Hadley
  - Piano Quintet in A minor, Op.50 (1919)
- Reynaldo Hahn
  - Piano Quintet in F♯ minor (1922)
- Marc-André Hamelin
  - Piano Quintet (2002 et seq.)
- Roy Harris
  - Piano Quintet (1936)
- Hamilton Harty
  - Piano Quintet in F major, Op. 12 (1904)
- Robert Helps
  - Quintet for violin, cello, flute, clarinet, piano (1997)
- Hans Werner Henze
  - Piano Quintet (1990–91)
- Jennifer Higdon
  - Scenes from the Poet's Dreams for Piano Quintet (1999)
- Alfred Hill
  - Life Quintet in E♭ major with vocal Finale (1912)
- Alistair Hinton
  - Piano Quintet (1980–81; 2005–10)
- Katherine Hoover
  - Piano Quintet, Op. 39, Da Pacem (1988)
- Mary Howe
  - Piano Quintet (1928)
- Hans Huber
  - Piano Quintet No.2 in G major, Op.125 (1907)
- Jean Huré
  - Piano Quintet in D major (1907–08)
- Vincent d'Indy
  - Piano Quintet in G minor, Op. 81 (1924)
- Mikhail Ippolitov-Ivanov
  - An Evening in Georgia, Op. 71 (for piano, flute, oboe, clarinet and bassoon, 1935)
- Paul Juon
  - No.1 in D minor, Op. 33 (1906) with 2 Violas (version with 2 violins, viola and cello Op. 33a)
  - No.2, Op. 44 (1909)
- Robert Kahn
  - Piano Quintet in D major (1926)
- Shigeru Kan-no
  - Piano Quintet WVE-180f (2002)
- Elena Kats-Chernin
  - The Offering (2015)
- Hugo Kaun
  - Piano Quintet in F minor, Op. 39 (1902)
- Frida Kern
  - Rondino for Piano Quintet, Op. 58 (1950)
- Charles Koechlin
  - Piano Quintet Op. 80 (1917–21)
- Joonas Kokkonen
  - Piano Quintet (1951–53)
- Erich Wolfgang Korngold
  - Piano Quintet in E major, Op. 15 (1921)
- Anna Korsun
  - Isostasie for piano quintet (2011)
- Lou Koster
  - E Summerowend / Soir d’été, Valse sérénade

==== L–M ====
- Marcel Labey
  - Piano Quintet Op. 31 (1927–30)
- László Lajtha
  - Piano Quintet 'Dramma per Musica', Op. 4 (1922)
- Marta Lambertini
  - Reunión for Piano Quintet (1994)
- Anne Lauber
  - Piano Quintet (1983)
- Claude Ledoux
  - Piano Quintet (2005)
- Paul Le Flem
  - Piano Quintet in E minor (1909)
- Kenneth Leighton
  - Piano Quintet Op. 34 (1959)
- Tania Léon
  - Ethos (2014)
- Lowell Liebermann
  - Quintet for Piano and Strings Op. 34 (1990)
- Alessandro Longo
  - Piano Quintet. Op.3
- Maria Teresa Luengo
  - Ambitos for Piano Quintet (1971)
- Peter Machajdík
  - Abandoned Gates (Piano quintet) (2016)
- Adela Maddison
  - Piano Quintet (1916)
- Frank Martin
  - Piano Quintet (1919)
- Bohuslav Martinů
  - Piano Quintet, H. 35 (1911)
  - Piano Quintet No. 1, H. 229 (1933)
  - Piano Quintet No. 2, H. 298 (1944)
- Cecilia McDowall
  - A Draught of Fishes (2000)
- Nikolai Medtner
  - Piano Quintet in C major (begun 1903, finished 1949). Op. Posth.
- Krzysztof Meyer
  - Piano Quintet Op. 76 (1991)
- Darius Milhaud
  - Quintet No. 1 for Piano and Strings Op. 312 (1950)
- Johanna Müller-Hermann
  - Piano Quintet in g minor, Op. 31
- Isabel Mundry
  - falten und fallen (for string quartet and fortepiano, 2006/7)

==== N–Q ====
- Lior Navok
  - Piano Quintet (2000)
- Dika Newlin
  - Piano Quintet (1941)
- Tatiana Nikolayeva
  - Piano Quintet (1947)
- Jane O'Leary
  - Apart/Together for piano and string quartet (2001)
  - Piano Quintet (2005)
  - Beneath the Dark Blue Waves – version for Piano Quintet (2020)
- Norman O'Neill
  - Piano Quintet in E minor Op. 10 (1902–03)
- Leo Ornstein
  - Piano Quintet (1927)
- Joan Panetti
  - In a Dark Time, the Eye Begins to See for piano quintet
- Hilda Paredes
  - Cotidales (2001)
- Janet Peachey
  - Chaconne for Piano Quintet
- Dora Pejačević
  - Piano Quintet in B minor Op. 40 (1918)
- Barbara Pentland
  - Piano Quintet (1983)
- Lorenzo Perosi
  - Piano Quintet No.1 in F major (1930–1931)
  - Piano Quintet No.2 in D minor (1930–1931)
  - Piano Quintet No.3 in A minor (1930–1931)
  - Piano Quintet No.4 (1930–1931)
- Nikolai Peyko
  - Piano Quintet (1961)
- Hans Pfitzner
  - Piano Quintet in C major, Op. 23
- Mario Pilati
  - Piano Quintet in D major (1927–28)
- Walter Piston
  - Piano Quintet (1949)
- Tobias Picker
  - Nova, for piano with violin, viola, cello and bass (1979)
  - Piano Quintet Op. 12
- Gabriel Pierné
  - Piano Quintet in E minor Op. 41 (1916–17)
- Victoria Poleva
  - Simurgh-Quintet (2000)
- Quincy Porter
  - Piano Quintet (1927)
- Florence Price
  - Piano Quintet in e minor (1936)
  - Piano Quintet in a minor
- Julia Purgina
  - ...quasi una siciliana... (2009)

==== R ====
- Behzad Ranjbaran
  - Enchanted Garden (2005)
- Alan Rawsthorne
  - Piano Quintet (1968)
- Ottorino Respighi
  - Piano Quintet in F minor (1902)
- Josef Rheinberger
  - Piano Quintet in C, Op. 114
- Malcolm D Robertson
  - Piano Quintet (2020)
- Ned Rorem
  - Winter Pages for clarinet, bassoon, violin, cello, and piano (1981)
  - Bright Music for flute, 2 violins, cello and piano (1987)
  - The Unquestioned Answer for flute, 2 violins, cello, and piano (2002)
- George Rochberg
  - Electrikaleidoscope for flute, clarinet, violin, cello & piano/electric piano (1972)
  - Piano Quintet (1975)
- Miklós Rózsa
  - Piano Quintet in F minor, Op. 2 (1928)
- Ludomir Różycki
  - Piano quintet in C minor, Op. 35 (1913–16)
- Elena Ruehr
  - The Worlds Revolve (2016)
- Joseph Ryelandt
  - Piano Quintet in A minor, Op. 32 (1901)
  - Piano Quintet Op. 133 (1944)

==== S ====
- Dirk Schäfer
  - Piano Quintet in D♭ major, Op.5 (1901)
- Philipp Scharwenka
  - Piano Quintet in B minor, Op. 118 (1911)
- Franz Schmidt
  - Piano Quintet (left-hand) in G major (1926)
- Florent Schmitt
  - Piano Quintet in B minor, Op. 51 (1908)
- Alfred Schnittke
  - Piano Quintet (1972–76)
- Georg Schumann
  - Piano Quintet No. 2 in F minor, Op. 49 (1909)
- Cyril Scott
  - Piano Quintet No. 1 (1924)
  - Piano Quintet No. 2 (1952)
- Reinhard Seehafer
  - Piano Quintet (2011)
- Alexander Shchetynsky
  - Epilogue (2008)
- Dmitri Shostakovich
  - Piano Quintet in G minor, Op. 57 (1940)
- Arlene Sierra
  - Harrow-lines for piano, violin, viola, cello, double bass (1999)
- Albert Siklós
  - Piano Quintet in C major, Op. 40 (publ. 1910)
- Dave Smith
  - Around and about (2014)
- Linda Catlin Smith
  - Piano Quintet (2014)
- Kaikhosru Shapurji Sorabji
  - Piano Quintet No. 1 (1919–20)
  - Piano Quintet No. 2 (1932–33)
- Bent Sørensen
  - Rosenbad – Papillons (2013)
- Ann Southam
  - Quintet (for string quartet and piano) (1986)
- Georgia Spiropoulos
  - ... landscapes & monstrous things ... (2016, for piano quintet, electronics and video)
- Iet Stants
  - Piano Quintet (1921)
- Carlos Stella
  - Hockney's Choclo: 10 variations, imitations and paraphrases on Piazzolla's arrangement of the tango 'El Choclo' after a picture by David Hockney for accordion, piano, violin, electric guitar and bass (2003)
- Richard Stöhr
  - Piano Quintet in C minor, Op.43
  - Piano Quintet in G minor, Op.94 (1943)
  - Piano Quintet in D minor, Op.111b (1945)
- Constantinos Stylianou
  - Three Scenes from a Funeral (2004)
- Ananda Sukarlan
  - "Annanolli's Sky" for piano quintet (2017)
- Edith Swepstone
  - Piano Quintet in f minor
  - Quintet in E♭ major (for piano and winds)
- Jadwiga Szajna-Lewandowska
  - Six Pieces (for piano and string quartet) (1978)
  - Five Pieces for Piano Quintet (1978)

==== T–Z ====
- Ellen Taaffe Zwilich
  - Piano Quintet (for violin, viola, cello, bass and piano, 2010)
- Germaine Tailleferre
  - Fantaisie sur un thème donné de Georges Caussade for Piano Quintet (1912)
- Sergei Taneyev
  - Piano Quintet in G minor, Op. 30 (1911)
- Boris Tchaikovsky
  - Piano Quintet (1962)
- Augusta Read Thomas
  - Acrobats (2018) for flute, bass clarinet, violin, cello and piano
- Ernst Toch
  - Piano Quintet, Op. 64 (1938)
- Donald Tovey
  - Piano Quintet in C major, Op.6 (1900)
- Joan Tower
  - Dumbarton Quintet for Piano Quintet (2008)
- Joaquín Turina
  - Piano Quintet in G minor, Op. 1 (1907)
- Stefania Turkewich
  - Piano Quintet (1960s)
- Mark-Anthony Turnage
  - Slide Stride (2002)
- Ralph Vaughan Williams
  - Piano Quintet in C minor (piano, violin, viola, cello & double bass) (1903)
- Oscar Vermeire
  - Quintette symphonique in B minor, Op. 25 (1910)
- Louis Vierne
  - Piano Quintet in C minor, Op. 42 (1917)
- Alba Rosa Viëtor
  - Quintetto in La Minore (1940)
- Julian Wagstaff
  - Piano Quintet (2002)
- Errollyn Wallen
  - Music for Tigers (2006)
- Graham Waterhouse
  - Rhapsodie Macabre (2011)
- Anton Webern
  - Piano Quintet (1907)
- Douglas Weiland
  - Piano Quintet, Op. 8 (1988)
- Mieczysław Weinberg [Моисей Самуилович Вайнберг]
  - Piano Quintet in F minor, Op. 18 (1944)
- Grace Williams
  - Phantasy Quintet (for piano and strings) (1928)
- William G. Whittaker
  - Among the Northumbrian Hills (1922)
- Ermanno Wolf-Ferrari
  - Piano Quintet in D♭ major, Op.6 (1901)
- Margot Wright
  - Piano Quintet in d minor (1932)
- Charles Wuorinen
  - Piano Quintet (1994)
  - Second Piano Quintet (2008)
- Iannis Xenakis
  - Akea {Άκεα} (1986)
- Yitzhak Yedid
  - Piano Quintet 'Since My Soul Loved', (2006)
  - Piano Quintet Enrique Granados A la Cubana Op.36
- Seung Ha You
  - Quintet for piano and strings op.1 (2007–2011)
- Théo Ysaÿe
  - Piano quintet in B minor, Op. 5 (before 1918)
- Hermann Zilcher
  - Piano Quintet in C♯ minor, Op. 42 (1918)
- Ellen Taaffe Zwilich
  - Quintet for Violin, Viola, Cello, Contrabass and Piano (2010)

== See also ==
- Quintet
