= Quintet for Piano and Winds =

Quintet for Piano and Winds may refer to:

- Quintet for Piano and Winds (Beethoven)
- Quintet for Piano and Winds (Mozart)
