= Frühling =

Frühling may refer to

- German for Spring

== People ==
- Carl Frühling (1868–1937), Austrian composer and pianist
- Tim Frühling (born 1975), German disc jockey and radio personality

== Culture ==
- Im Frühling (Op. 101, no. 1, D. 882) by Franz Schubert
- Frühlings Erwachen, see Spring Awakening (play)
- Der Frühling braucht Zeit, 1966 East German drama film directed by Günter Stahnke
- Frühlingsstimmen (Op. 410) by Johann Strauss II
- Frühlingsrauschen (Op. 32, No. 3) by Christian Sinding
- Frühlingssonate; see Violin Sonata No. 5 (Beethoven)
