= Piano Quintet (Saint-Saëns) =

Piano Quintet by Camile Saint-Saëns

Piano Quintet in A Minor
- by Camille Saint-Saëns
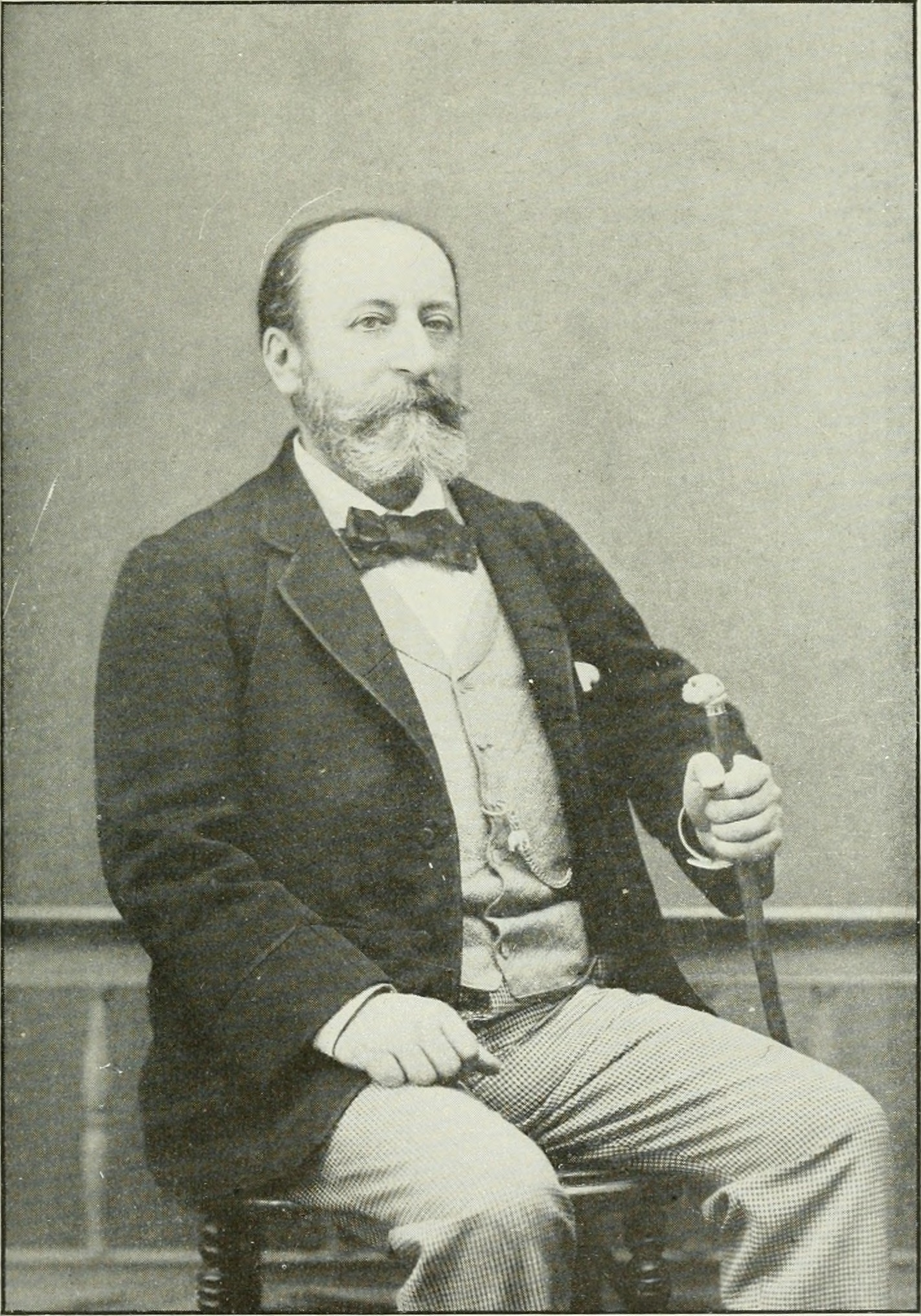
- Key: A minor
- Opus: 14
- Period: Romantic
- Genre: Piano Quintet
- Composed: 1855
- Dedication: Charlotte Gayard Masson
- Published: 1865
- Movements: 4
- Scoring: String quartet and piano

Camille Saint-Saëns's Piano Quintet in A minor, Op. 14, is a piano quintet composed in 1855 and published 10 years later in 1865. The piano quintet was the first work of chamber music written by Saint-Saëns. Additionally, he was only the second French composer to attempt a piano quintet.

The composer dedicated the piece to his great-aunt, Charlotte Gayard Masson, who lived with him and his mother.

== Structure ==
The work consists of four movements:

1. Allegretto moderato e maestoso
2. Andante sostenuto
3. Presto
4. Allegretto assai ma tranquillo
