= Vojtěch Hřímalý =

Czech composer (1842–1908)

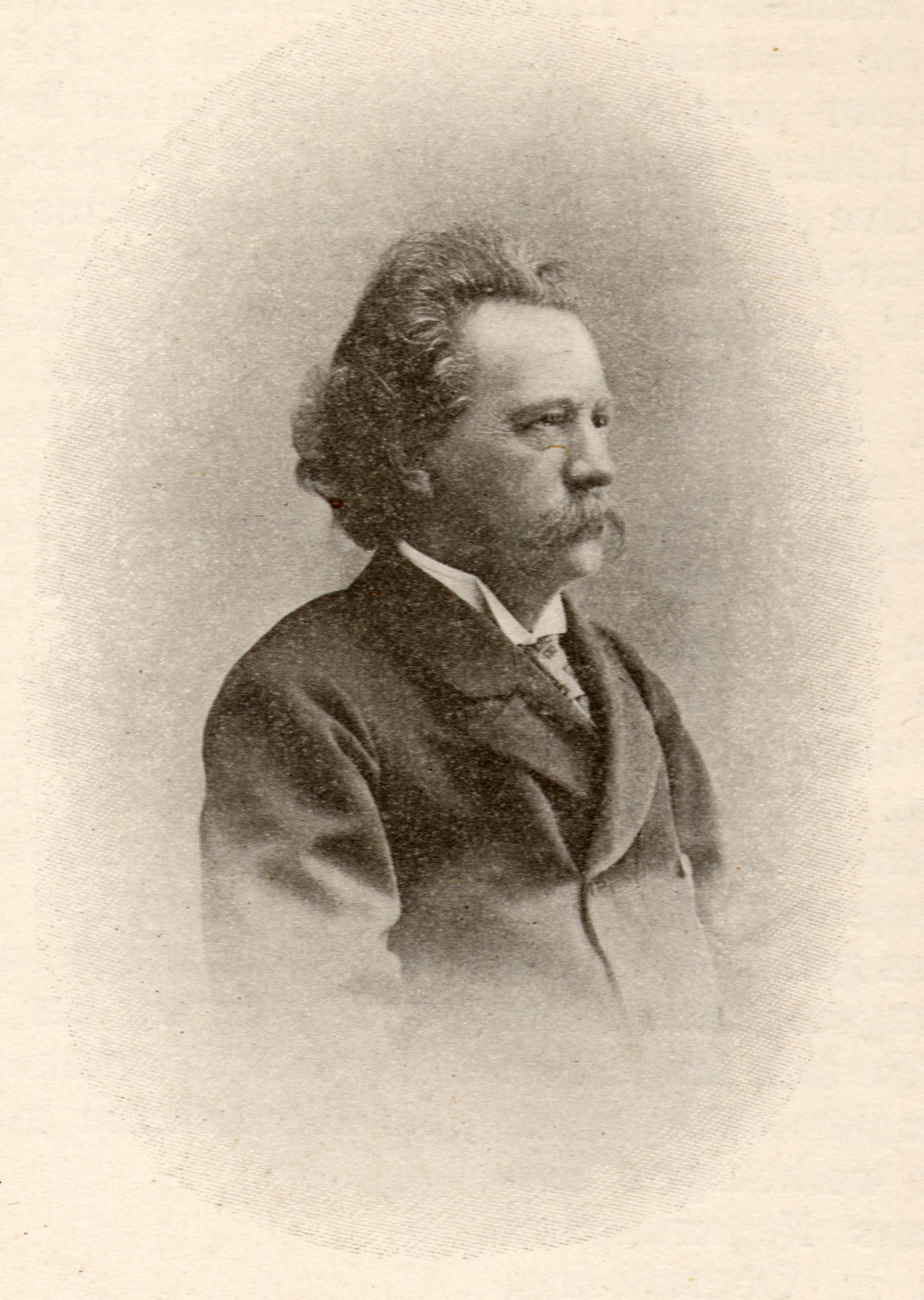
Hřímalý in 1903

Vojtěch Hřímalý (30 July 1842 – 15 June 1908) was a Czech composer, violinist and conductor. He is the older brother of the violinist Jan Hřímalý.

== Life ==
Vojtěch Hřímalý was born on 30 July 1842 in Plzeň, Bohemia, Austrian Empire. He came from a musical family. His father and all his siblings were musicians. He studied at the Prague Conservatory. After finishing school, he became concertmaster of the Rotterdam Opera Orchestra. A year later, he moved to Gothenburg, where, in addition to the opera orchestra, he worked as an organist and, after Bedřich Smetana, conducted public concerts.

In 1868, he returned to Prague and became concertmaster and director of the Provisional Theatre Orchestra. After disagreements with the theatre management, he moved to the German Theatre in Prague, where he worked as second conductor. He became chairman of the Philharmonic Society and, with his brothers Jan, Bohuslav and Jaromír, founded the Hřímalý Brothers String Quartet. In November 1872, he played in the first performance of Antonín Dvořák's first Piano Quintet at an event organised by Ludevít Procházka.

In 1874, he went to Černovice in what was then Bukovina (today Chernivtsi in Ukraine), where he was active in many different fields. He was the conductor of a theater orchestra, with which he also organized public concerts, directed a male choir, was the principal conductor of a string quartet, and taught at music schools and at the local university. He worked for some time in Lviv.

Hřímalý died in Vienna on 15 June 1908.

== Works ==
In addition to teaching materials, he wrote Operas (Zakletý princ (The Enchanted Prince) (1872) and Švanda dudák (Švanda the bagpiper) (1896)), Orchestral compositions, Programme music, Chamber compositions and Songs.
