= Piano Quintet No. 1 (Bloch) =

Ernest Bloch's Piano Quintet No. 1 is a quintet for piano, 2 violins, viola, and cello. It is regarded as one of Bloch's greatest achievements.

Composed in Cleveland in 1923, the work was markedly innovative for its time and has been described as "suffused with tension", and as embodying a "grim, angry, yet ultimately redemptive vision".

== Structure ==
There are three movements:

1. Agitato
2. Andante mistico
3. Allegro energico.

The work is based around a motto theme built from ascending and descending fourths. The first movement falls roughly into the shape of a sonata allegro, and contrasts material of a grim tone with more mysterious, reflective moments. The second movement is mournful and builds to a huge climax before fading away. The final movement is more rhapsodic in nature contrasting reflective and energetic passages, before ending on a perfect cadence with a sense of serene resolution. The work is notable for its frequent use of quarter tones.

== Recordings ==
Notable historical recordings:

- The first recording was by the Pro Arte Quartet with Alfredo Casella in 1933.
- Quintetto Chigiano: Riccardo Brengola, violin; Mario Benvenuti, violin II; Giovanni Leone, viola; Lino Filippini, cello; Sergio Lorenzi, piano (Decca LXT2626 - 1951)
