= Piano Quintet (Turina) =

1907 composition by Joaquín Turina

Joaquín Turina's Piano Quintet in G minor, Op. 1 was composed in 1907 at the age of 24 while he studied at the Schola Cantorum in Paris with Vincent d'Indy, and it was the composer's first published composition. The piano quintet was premiered on 6 May that year in the Salle Aeolian by the Parent Quartet, to whose leader, Armand Parent, it was dedicated, while the first Spanish performance took place on 22 September in Sevilla. Ten days later the Quintet was awarded a prize in the Salon d'Automne by a jury composed of Bourgault-Ducoudray, Bruneau, Fauré, d'Indy, Magnard, Maus, Parent, and Pierné.

The composition, lasting c.30 minutes, is inscribed in the Franckian tradition. It consists of four movements which do not follow strictly the traditional sonata scheme as Turina fuses the scherzo and slow movement and precedes the sonata-allegro with a slow fugue. The movements are marked in Spanish, French and Italian:

1. Fuga lenta
2. Animé
3. Andante — Scherzo
4. Final

Turina didn't favour the Quintet's performance in later stages of his career as he considered it an impersonal work. It was recovered in 1982 in the composer's centenary commemorations.

== Discography ==
C. Busch (vn), Menuhin Festival Piano Quartet. Claves, 1994
B. Ambrosini, Greenwich Quartet. Almaviva, 2001
