= Piano Quintet (Hummel) =

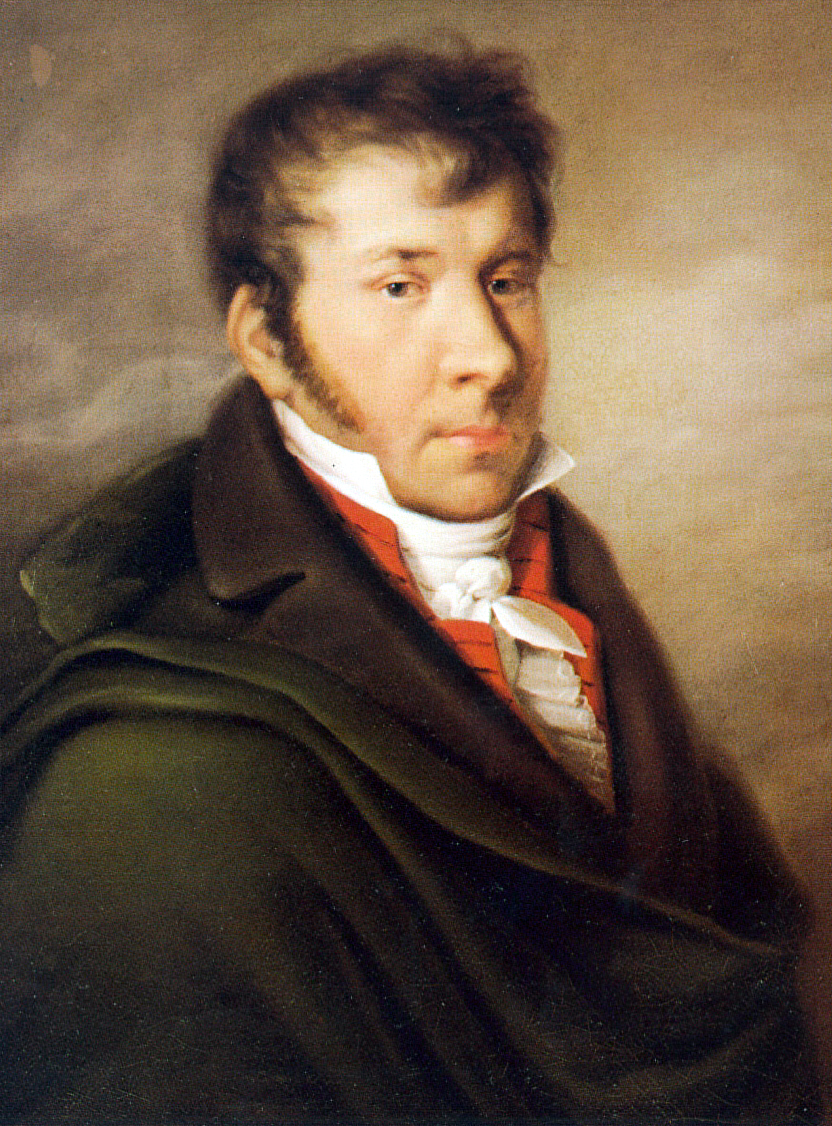
Johann Nepomuk Hummel, portrait by Joseph Willibrord Mähler, c. 1814

The Piano Quintet in E♭ minor, Op.87, is a composition by the Austrian composer Johann Nepomuk Hummel. Composed in 1802, it was not published until around 1822 and might have served as an example cited by Sylvester Paumgartner who commissioned Hummel’s friend Schubert to write his own piano quintet.

== Instrumentation ==
The piece is written for a then-common combination of instruments in a piano quintet; namely, the piano is joined by violin, viola, cello and double bass (the double bass is replaced with another violin, much like a string quartet, in later piano quintets). Perhaps, along with Schubert's Trout Quintet, the two are the most famous pieces written for such a combination. Hummel later transcribed his septet for this combination of instruments as well.

== Movements ==
The piece is written in four movements:

1. Allegro e risoluto assai
2. Minuet e trio: Allegro con fuoco
3. Largo
4. Finale: Allegro agitato

In almost all movements, it is the piano which takes a leading role and even goes as far as displaying virtuosic passages. Despite all that, the piece exhibits the congeniality of a piece of chamber music much like that of the music composed by Hummel's contemporary, Schubert.
