= Piano Quintet (Schumann) =

1842 chamber work by Robert Schumann

- by Robert Schumann
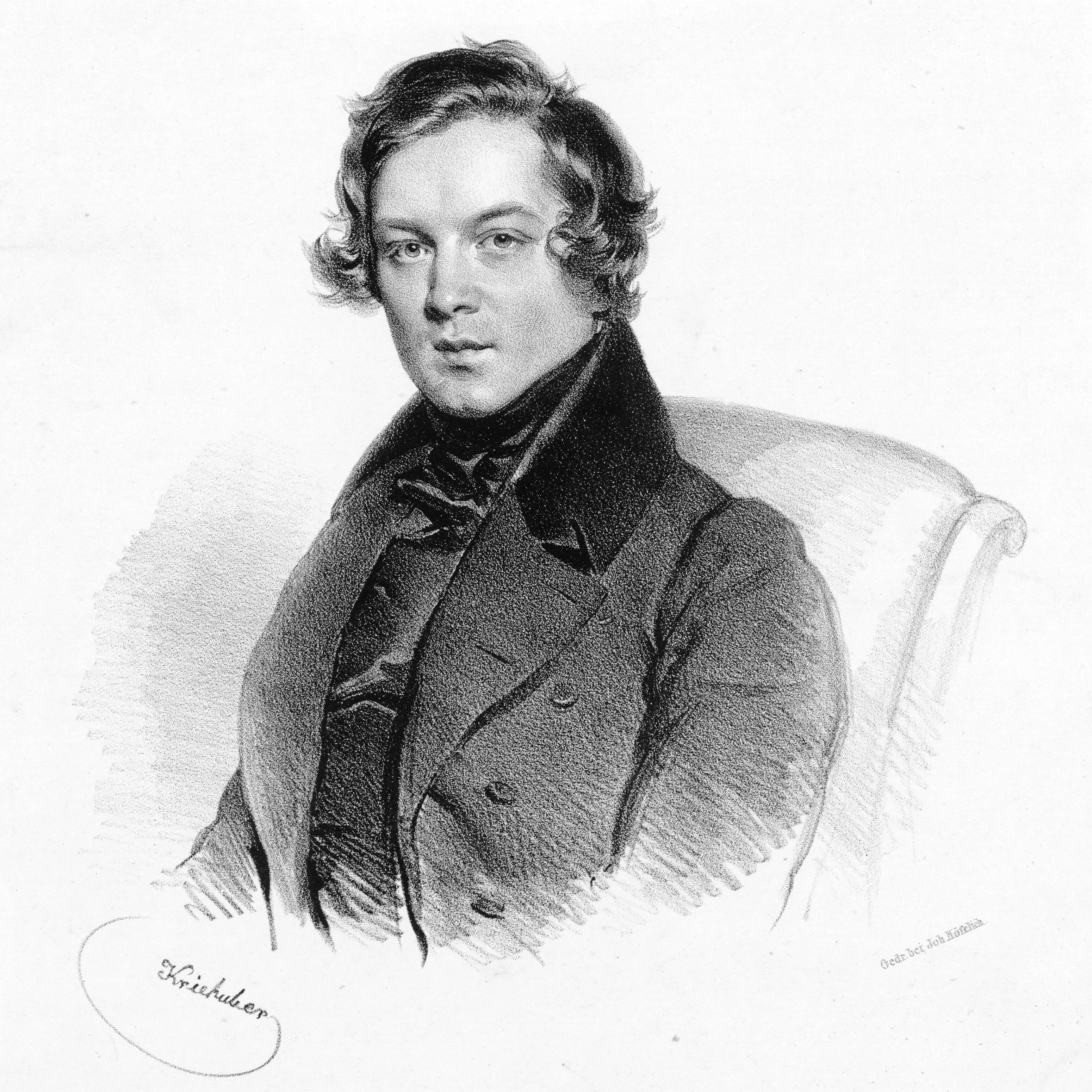
- Robert Schumann, lithograph by Josef Kriehuber, in 1839
- Key: E♭ major
- Opus: 44
- Composed: 1842
- Dedication: Clara Schumann
- Performed: 18 January 1843: Gewandhaus Leipzig
- Published: 1843
- Movements: 4

The Piano Quintet in E♭ major, Op. 44, by Robert Schumann was composed in 1842 and received its first public performance the following year. Noted for its "extroverted, exuberant" character, Schumann's piano quintet is considered one of his finest compositions and a major work of nineteenth-century chamber music. Composed for piano and string quartet, the work revolutionized the instrumentation and musical character of the piano quintet and established it as a quintessentially Romantic genre.

The autograph manuscript of the work is preserved in the Universitäts- und Landesbibliothek Bonn.

== Composition and performance ==
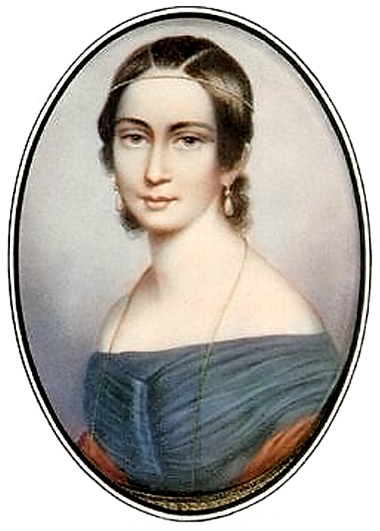
Clara Schumann (née Wieck) in 1838. Robert Schumann dedicated the quintet to Clara, and she performed the piano part in the work's first public performance in 1843.

Schumann composed his piano quintet in just a few weeks in September and October 1842, in the course of his so-called Year of Chamber Music. Before 1842 Schumann had completed no chamber music at all, with the exception of an early piano quartet composed in 1829. Following his marriage to Clara in 1840, Schumann turned to the composition of songs, chamber music and orchestral works. During his year-long concentration in 1842 upon chamber music he executed the three string quartets, Op. 41, the piano quintet, Op. 44; the piano quartet, Op. 47; and the Phantasiestücke for piano trio, Op. 88. Schumann's work in that year was buoyant in character; John Daverio considers the Piano Quintet to be the "creative double" of the Piano Quartet that was written few weeks later, both displaying the "extroverted, exuberant side of the composer's creative genius".

Schumann had begun his career primarily as a composer for the keyboard; after his detour into writing for string quartet, according to Joan Chisell, the "reunion with the piano" which the piano quintet provoked gave "his creative imagination ... a new lease on life."

Schumann dedicated the piano quintet to his wife Clara. She was due to perform the piano part in the first private performance of the quintet on 6 December 1842 at the home of Henriette Voigt and her husband Carl. However she fell ill and Felix Mendelssohn stepped in, sight-reading the "fiendish" piano part. Mendelssohn's suggestions to Schumann after this performance led to revisions to the inner movements, including the addition to the third movement of a second trio.

Clara Schumann did play the piano part at the quintet's first public performance, which took place on 8 January 1843 at the Leipzig Gewandhaus. Clara pronounced the work "splendid, full of vigor and freshness." She often performed the quintet throughout her life. A notable performance came in 1852, when Schumann asked that the younger pianist Julius Tausch replace Clara in the quintet, explaining that "a man understands that better."

== Instrumentation and genre ==
Schumann's piano quintet is scored for piano and string quartet (two violins, viola, and cello).

Schumann's pairing the piano with an ordinary string quartet reflected the changing technical capabilities of the piano and the cultural importance of the quartet. By 1842, the string quartet had come to be regarded as the most significant and prestigious of the chamber music ensembles, while advances in the design of the piano had increased its power and dynamic range. Bringing the piano and string quartet together, Schumann's quintet exploits fully the expressive capacity of these forces in combination, alternating conversational passages between the five instruments with concerto-like sections in which the combined forces of the strings are massed against the piano. At a time when chamber music was moving out of the salon and into public concert halls, Schumann reimagined the piano quintet as a musical genre "suspended between private and public spheres" according to Daverio, alternating between "quasi-symphonic and more properly chamber-like elements."

== Influences of Beethoven and Schubert on the piano quintet ==
Tovey remarks the formal influence which Beethoven exerted over the quintet. He argues that the final movement's lengthy coda is a typically Beethovenian device, and likens the quintet in this respect to the ninth and fourteenth string quartets. He writes that the scherzo so much reflects his style that it "might almost have come from Beethoven."

Daverio has argued that the quintet was influenced by Schubert's Piano Trio No. 2 in E♭ major, a work Schumann had studied and performed intensively over several months in 1828-1829 and which he greatly admired, describing it as Schubert's "immortal trio." Both works are in the key of E♭, feature a funeral march in the second movement, and conclude with finales dramatically resurrecting earlier thematic material, a composition technique called cyclic form.

== Analysis ==
External audio
- Performed by Menahem Pressler and the Emerson String Quartet
- I. Allegro brillante
- II. In modo d'una marcia. Un poco largamente
- III. Scherzo: Molto vivace
- IV. Allegro ma non troppo

The piece has four movements in the standard fast-slow-scherzo-fast pattern:

1. Allegro brillante
2. In modo d'una marcia. Un poco largamente
3. Scherzo: Molto vivace
4. Allegro ma non troppo

=== I. Allegro brillante ===
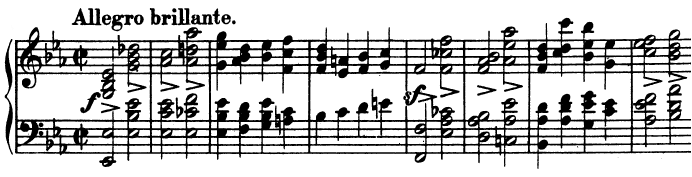
Movement 1, piano part, mm.1-8

The first movement's is marked Allegro brillante. This movement exposes much material which reappears later in the work. It sets in contrast exuberant material reflecting Schumann's brilliant, wild side, as described by Schumann in the character of Florestan, with slower, 'Eusebian' sections of great passion.

The movement's energetic main theme opens in minims, and characterized by wide, upward-leaping intervals. Tovey writes of the theme that its use of upward leaps is so striking that "it is impossible for the violoncello to throw in a casual leap of an octave in minims without implying the first theme". The contrasting second theme, marked dolce, is reached after a transitional section marked by glances at remoter flat keys. It is presented as a duet between cello and viola, and its "meltingly romantic" character is typical of Schumann's ardent inspiration in this quintet.

The central development consists largely of virtuoso figuration in the piano, based on a diminution of the third and fourth bars of the opening theme, which modulates between two vigorous statements of the latter in A♭ and F minor. The figuration is transposed down a tone more or less exactly on its second appearance to lead back to the tonic key. After a standard recapitulation of the main themes a short, energetic coda rounds off the movement. In overall form the opening Allegro is tightly organised, but a deviation from the Beethovenian model. Tovey writes: "he is writing an altogether new type of sonata-work; a kind that stands to the classical sonata somewhat as a very beautiful and elaborate mosaic stands to a landscape-picture."

=== II. In modo d'una marcia. Un poco largamente ===
Comparison of extracts from Movement 1 (A) and Movement 2 (B) of Schumann's piano quintet

The main theme (A) of this movement is a funeral march in C minor. It alternates with two contrasting episodes, one a lyrical theme (B) carried by the first violin and cello, the second (C), Agitato, carried by the piano with string accompaniment, which is a transformation of the principal theme disguised by changes in rhythm and tempo. The whole forms a seven-part rondo:

A (C minor)
B (C major)
A (C minor)
C (variant of A, F minor)
A′ (C minor)
B′ (F major)
A (C minor)

The transition between funeral march and Agitato episode reuses in the piano and violin the descending octaves appearing at the end of the first movement's exposition (see figure). This is one of several moments in the quintet where Schumann creates unity across movements by subtly reintroducing thematic material. Theme A, the funeral march, is varied upon its return after the Agitato section with rapid triplets in the piano and counterpoint reminiscent of the previous episode in first violin and cello, while the second appearance of B in F major also is with an enriched piano accompaniment.

=== III. Scherzo: Molto vivace ===
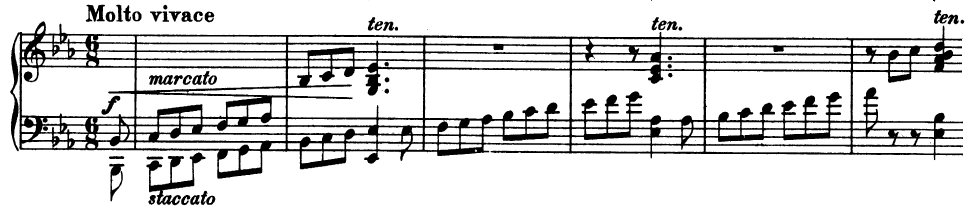
Movement 3, piano part, mm.1-6

The main section of this lively movement is built almost entirely on ascending and descending scales. There are two trios. Trio I, in G♭ major, is a lyrical canon for violin and viola. Trio II, added at the suggestion of Mendelssohn, is a heavily accented moto perpetuo whose 2/4 meter and restlessly modulating, mostly minor tonality are in sharp contrast to the 6/8 and relative stability of the rest. Since Mendelssohn mentioned that this section wasn't "lively" enough, Schumann rewrote it with a flurry of sixteenth notes making it very demanding for the strings, particularly the cello. After the third and final appearance of the scherzo, a brief coda based on the scales concludes the movement, slipping in a recall of Trio I in the final bars.

=== IV. Allegro ma non troppo ===
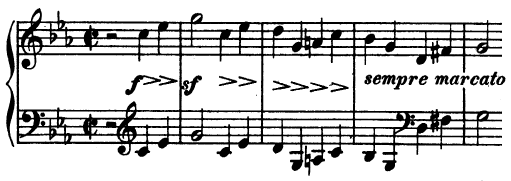
Schumann: Piano Quintet, finale, piano part, mm.1-4 (Theme A1)

The finale begins in G minor, on a C-minor chord, rather than in the tonic. The movement as a whole is cast in an unusual form that partly reflects, but ultimately triumphs over Schumann's frequent difficulties with the conventional sonata form in his larger-scale instrumental movements. The original handling of both form and key contrasts sharply with the largely conventional formal organization of the previous three movements.

A summary of the main themes and key areas follows:

m. 1: G minor theme A_{1}
m. 21: E♭ major theme A_{2}
m. 29: D minor A_{1}
m. 37: B♭ major A_{2}
m. 43: G major theme B (with an important motive B′, first introduced by the viola in 54), B itself is a diminished version of A_{2}.
m. 77: B minor-major A_{1}
m. 114: E major-G♯ minor theme C (accompanied by B′)

m. 136: G♯ minor A_{1}
m. 148: D♯ minor A_{1}
m. 156: B major A_{2}
m. 164: B♭ minor A_{1}
m. 172: G♭ major A_{2}
m. 178: E♭ major B recapitulated

m. 212: G minor A_{1}
m. 224: E♭ major theme D
m. 248: Fugato on A_{1}
m. 274: E♭ major C (B’) recapitulated
m. 319: E♭ major, fugato on A_{1} combined with the opening theme of the first movement, Allegro brillante
m. 378: E♭ major D recapitulated
m. 402: Coda

The main themes, A_{1}, A_{2}, B and C, are all introduced in the first 135 bars, making this opening roughly equivalent to a sonata exposition. The tonic key, however, is almost entirely absent, with the music mostly remaining in G minor/major until the introduction of the lyrical theme C in the remote key of E major at m. 114. The music modulates to G♯ minor to begin what is essentially a recapitulation in m. 136, with B returning in E♭ to finally establish the true tonic in m. 178, very late in a lengthy movement.

More than 200 bars remain to unfold, however, almost entirely in the tonic. During their course, Schumann introduces yet another theme, the syncopated D, gets around to recapitulating the lyrical theme C in the tonic, and develops the music further via two fugato passages, the second unexpectedly and impressively incorporating the principal theme of the opening Allegro brillante and combining it with the opening theme A_{1}, finally heard in the tonic.

This coup may have been inspired by a similar confluence of themes in Mendelssohn's E♭ quartet op. 12. It also, probably deliberately, evokes the climactic contrapuntal finales of works such as Mozart's Jupiter Symphony. The movement as a whole can be noted for the rondo-like reappearances of the opening theme A_{1}, which consistently avoids the tonic key until the final fugato; for its innovative key scheme, which combines the restless modulations of a traditional sonata development with the idea of recapitulation in the tonic; and for its successful integration of counterpoint within a non-contrapuntal formal structure.

== Reception and influence ==
Schumann's piano quintet was widely acclaimed and much imitated. Its success firmly established the piano quintet as a significant, and quintessentially Romantic, chamber music genre. The Piano Quintet in F minor, Op. 34 of Johannes Brahms, reworked from an earlier sonata for two pianos (itself a reworking of an earlier string quintet) at the urging of Clara Schumann, was one of a number of later piano quintets that show Schumann's influence and adopt his choice of instrumentation.

Schumann's Piano Quintet failed to please at least one discriminating listener: Franz Liszt heard the piece performed at Schumann's home in 1848 and described it as "somewhat too Leipzigerisch," a reference to the conservative music of composers from Leipzig, especially Felix Mendelssohn. Schumann took enormous offense at this remark, especially because Mendelssohn, who was a great friend of Schumann's and whom Schumann somewhat idolised, had died only a year earlier. By some accounts Schumann rushed at Liszt and seized him by the shoulders. Liszt eventually apologised. Schumann did not forget Liszt's offhanded insult, and mentioned it several times in letters to Liszt. Liszt's relationship with the Schumanns was never entirely mended.

== Use in later art and music ==
The funeral march theme of the second movement is prominently used as the main theme of the film Fanny and Alexander by Ingmar Bergman, and is played on violin by Rutger Hauer's character Lothos while Buffy kills the vampire portrayed by Paul Reubens in the 1992 feature Buffy the Vampire Slayer. It is also featured prominently on the all-classical soundtrack of the noted 1934 horror film The Black Cat. It is used several times in Yorgos Lanthimos' 2018 period piece The Favourite.

== Bibliography ==
- Schumann's Piano Quintet was first published in 1843. It was republished by Breitkopf and Hartel in Robert Schumann's Werke Serie V (1881).
- Berger, Melvin. "Guide to Chamber Music", Dover, 2001, 404-405.
- Chisell, Joan (1979). Schumann. London: J. M. Dent and Sons. ISBN 9780460125888.
- Daverio, John (2002). Crossing Paths: Schubert, Schumann, and Brahms. Oxford: Oxford University Press.
- Daverio, John. Robert Schumann: Herald of a "New Poetic Age." (1997, Oxford)
- Daverio, John. "'Beautiful and Abstruse Conversations': The Chamber Music of Schumann." Nineteenth-Century Chamber Music. Ed. Stephen E. Hefling. New York: Schirmer, 1998: 208–41.
- Nelson, J.C. ‘Progressive Tonality in the Finale of the Piano Quintet, op.44 of Robert Schumann’. Indiana Theory Review, xiii/1 (1992): 41–51.
- Potter, Tully. Liner notes. SCHUMANN: Piano Quintet, Op. 44 / BRAHMS: Piano Quartet No. 2 (Curzon, Budapest Quartet) (1951-1952)
- Reich, Nancy (2001). Clara Schumann: The Artist and the Woman. Ithaca, NY: Cornell University Press.
- Smallman, Basil. The Piano Quartet and Quintet: Style, Structure, and Scoring.
- Stowell, Robin. The Cambridge Companion to the String Quartet.
- Tovey, Sir Donald Francis (1944). Essays in Musical Analysis. pp. 149–54. ISBN 978-0-19-315161-1.
- Wollenberg, Susan. ‘Schumann's Piano Quintet in E flat: the Bach Legacy’, The Music Review, lii (1991): 299–305.
- Westrup, J. ‘The Sketch for Schumann's Piano Quintet op.44’, Convivium musicorum: Festschrift Wolfgang Boetticher. Ed. H. Hüschen and D.-R. Moser. Berlin, 1974: 367–71.
