= Carl Frühling =

Austrian composer and pianist

Carl Frühling (28 November 1868 – 25 November 1937) was an Austrian composer and pianist.

Born in Lemberg (now Lviv, Ukraine), he attended from 1887 until 1889 the Gesellschaft der Musikfreunde where he was taught the piano by Anton Door and music theory by Franz Krenn. He became a piano accompanist and teacher, working with Bronisław Huberman, Pablo de Sarasate, Egon Wellesz, and the Rosé Quartet. He died in Vienna in poverty.

His early piano works are salon pieces, while his Piano Quintet, Op. 30, and Clarinet Trio, Op. 40, are more substantial, written in the Romantic tradition. In 2009, his Piano Quintet was reprinted by Edition Silvertrust. Much of his music is lost or has yet to be uncovered. Steven Isserlis, the cellist, has championed his music, some of which he has rediscovered and performed.

== Compositions ==
=== Orchestral ===
- Piano Concerto, Op. 12
- Festmarsch, Op. 23
- Scènes de ballet, Op. 34
- Suite in F major, Op. 36
- Heitere Ouvertüre, Op. 75
- Miniaturen, suite, Op. 78
- Humoreske, Op. 87

=== Chamber ===
- Sonata, Op. 22, for cello and piano
- String Quartet in E♭ major, Op. 25
- Piano Quintet in F♯ minor, Op. 30
- Piano Trio in E♭ major, Op. 32
- Piano Quartet in D major, Op. 35
- Trio in A minor, Op. 40, for clarinet, cello and piano (published 1925 by F. E. C. Leuckart)
- Fantasie, Op. 55, for flute and piano
- Duettino, Op. 57, for 2 flutes
- Rondo, Op. 66, for flute and piano

=== Piano ===
- Lucie, mazurka, Op. 1
- La piquante, polka française, Op. 5
- Mazurka brillante, Op. 11
- Serenade, Op. 13
- Pas des sylphides, waltz, Op. 14
- 5 pièces, Opp. 15–19
- 3 Klavierstücke, Op. 21
- Konzertwalzer, Op. 24
- 2 Klavierstücke, Op. 37

=== Choral ===
- Große Messe in G major, Op. 6
- Cantata (A. Silesius), Op. 54, for solo voices, mixed chorus and organ
- 3 Sinnsprüche (Assim Agha), Op. 62, for mixed chorus
- Lied der Eintagsfliegen (C. Schneller), Op. 63, for female chorus and piano (4 hands)
- Am Strome, Op. 67, for male chorus
- 2 Lieder im Volkston, Op. 68, for mixed chorus
- Brudergruss, Op. 73, for male chorus
- Matt gießt der Mond, Op. 74, for mixed chorus
- Opp. 77, 89, 91, 93, 102, for mixed chorus
- Opp. 80, 83, 86, 106, for male chorus

=== Solo vocal ===
- Der Landsturm (M. Marton), Op. 39, for voice and orchestra
- 3 Gesänge nach altjapansichen Gedichten, Op. 47, for voice and orchestra
- Gesang Buddhas, Op. 59, for baritone and wind orchestra
- 2 Gesänge, Op. 70, for tenor and orchestra
- 5 Lieder, for voice and orchestra
- Lieder for voice and piano
