= Piano Quintet (Brahms) =

1865 musical work by Johannes Brahms

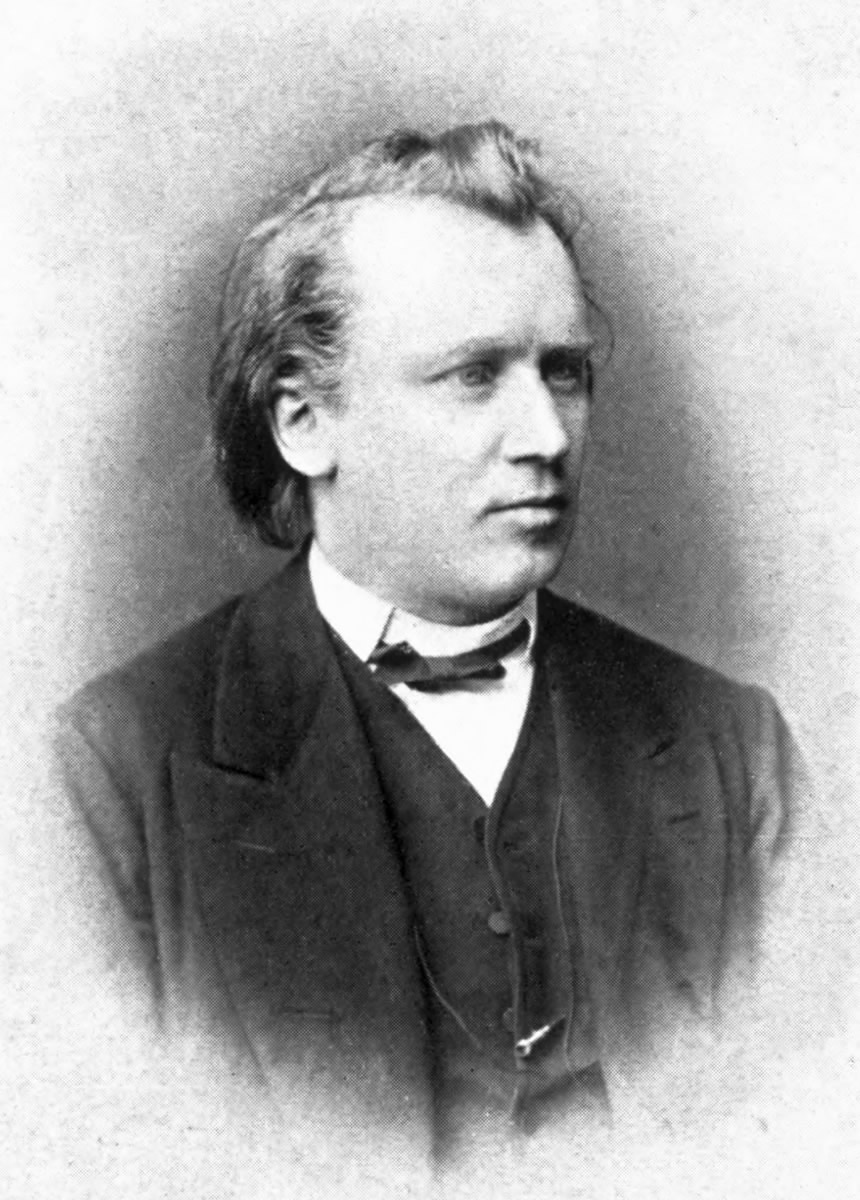
Johannes Brahms, photographed c. 1872

The Piano Quintet in F minor, Op. 34, by Johannes Brahms was completed during the summer of 1864 and published in 1865. It was dedicated to Her Royal Highness Princess Anna of Hesse. As with most piano quintets composed after Robert Schumann's Piano Quintet (1842), it is written for piano and string quartet (two violins, viola and cello).

The work, "often called the crown of his chamber music," began life as a string quintet (completed in 1862 and scored for two violins, viola, and two cellos). Brahms transcribed the quintet into a sonata for two pianos (in which form Brahms and Carl Tausig performed it) before giving it its final form. Brahms destroyed the original version for string quintet, but published the Sonata as Op. 34b. As a piano quintet, it was given its premiere in Paris some two weeks before Good Friday in 1868.

The outer movements are more adventurous than usual in terms of harmony and are unsettling in effect. The introduction to the finale, with its rising figure in semitones, is especially remarkable. Piano and strings play an equally important role throughout this work, which Swafford notes for its "unity of expression" and a consistently dark mood: "at times anguished, at times (in the scherzo) demonic, at times tragic."

== Structure ==
Piano Quintet in the version for two pianos
I. Allegro non troppo

II. Andante, un poco adagio

III. Scherzo: Allegro

IV. Finale: Poco sostenuto – Allegro non troppo – Presto, non troppo
Performed by Neal and Nancy O'Doan

The piece is in four movements:

1. Allegro non troppo (F minor)
2. Andante, un poco adagio (A♭ major)
3. Scherzo: Allegro (C minor → C major, trio in C major)
4. Finale: Poco sostenuto – Allegro non troppo – Presto, non troppo (F minor)

=== I. Allegro non troppo ===
This movement begins with a unison theme in all instruments. It is in sonata form with the exposition concluding in the major-mode submediant (D♭), which is approached through a second subject in its enharmonic parallel minor (C♯). The first theme's heavy emphasis on D♭ prepares and smooths out this modulation, as well as its reversal with the approach to the expositional repeat. It is notable that Brahms' other F minor sonata-form first movements – from the Sonata Op. 5 and the Clarinet Sonata Op. 120/1 – also have an expositional goal of D♭ major, and both also are followed by a slow movement in A♭ major.

In the recapitulation, the bridge and first half of the second theme are transposed by a fifth, with the latter beginning in F♯ minor, before the tonic key is restored halfway through. A peaceful post-recapitulory coda in F major is cut short by a return to the stormy first theme.

=== II. Andante, un poco adagio ===
This calm movement is in A♭ major, with a second theme in E major – enharmonically a major third lower, as in the first movement.

=== III. Scherzo: Allegro ===
This movement is in ternary form (ABA) with A being a scherzo in C minor (with a secondary theme in C major and E♭ major) and B being a trio in C major.

This movement shows the influence of Franz Schubert's String Quintet. Like Schubert's masterpiece, this movement is also in C minor/major, and ends in the same manner as Schubert's finale, with strong emphasis on the flat supertonic D♭, before the final tonic C.

=== IV. Finale: Poco sostenuto – Allegro non troppo – Presto, non troppo ===
The last movement "begins slowly and gropingly," with "the most melancholy moments in the entire work." An introduction begins this movement, which is harmonically reminiscent of Beethoven's late string quartets.

After a cadence on the dominant C, the cello introduces the first theme of the sonata-allegro, which owes its simplicity to Brahms's interest in Hungarian folk music and also resembles the opening of the finale of Schubert's "Grand Duo" for piano four-hands. A vociferous, stormy bridge connects the first theme to the second theme, which is in the minor-mode dominant key (C). The expositional closing theme, a jerky version of the first theme, leads into the recapitulation, which involves a developmental episode that emphasises the parallel major.

The end of the recapitulation leads into a grave, quiet section in the initial tempo of the introduction, but it is arguably a simple reworking of the expositional closing theme (albeit in F minor). This short section modulates to C♯ minor, which, if it pertains to D♭ major of the first movement (as it is the parallel minor), may symbolize the musical odyssey of the entire piece. The tempo is presto for this greatly extended coda in F minor, which develops a new theme as well as the second theme of the sonata allegro section, and ultimately culminates in an unrelenting outburst of fiery passion, providing an intense conclusion for the entire piece.

== Arrangements ==
Composer Robin Holloway arranged the Brahms Piano Quintet for full orchestra in 2008. A live 2014 performance can be heard on the NPK Radio website. A CD recording was made in 2023 by Paul Mann conducting the BBC Symphony Orchestra on the Toccata Classics label. The arrangement was called Symphony in F, Op. 34.

Composer Nick Norton has also arranged the piece for piano and orchestra.
