= Franz Limmer =

Austrian composer, conductor and musical performer

Franz Limmer (2 October 1808 – 19 January 1857) was an Austrian composer, conductor and musical performer.

== Life ==
Franz Limmer was born in born in Matzleinsdorf, a suburb of Vienna, Austrian Empire. He was the only son of a businessman who owned a silk mill in Vienna. His father originally meant for him to take over the business, but as Franz was more interested in music than anything else, he was permitted to choose a musical career. From age 10 he studied the violin and guitar with a teacher named Klein, and when he left school he entered the Vienna Conservatory, where he studied the cello with Josef Hartinger (1811–1878) and the clarinet with Joseph Friedlowsky (c. 1777 – 1859). On his graduation he received a silver honours medal with a portrait of Mozart, with his name and the date engraved on the back. This honour led to his immediate acceptance in the Viennese circle of performers. Encouraged by his success he took up the study of harmony, figured bass, composition and scoring with two teachers, Erasmus Kessler and Ignaz Ritter von Seyfried (1776–1841).

At age 17 he started work on his first Mass, which was performed in the Augustinian Church before he was 18. This drew attention to him as a composer, and a productive period followed.

In 1834, at age 26, Limmer was invited to accept the post of conductor at the German Theater in Timișoara, Austrian Empire (now Romania), by its director, Theodor Müller. The theater ran up to 15 opera productions a year, including local premieres of Beethoven's Fidelio and Verdi's Ernani, Macbeth, Il Trovatore and Othello. He wrote his Grand Quintuor for piano, violin, viola, violoncello and double bass, op.13 in this period among many other works. A year later he was appointed choir director of the Timișoara Cathedral as the successor of the late Joseph Kratochwill.

Limmer stayed in Timișoara, until his death.

== Music ==
Limmer was not averse to musical innovation. According to the Timișoara journalist and historian Béla Schiff, he conducted a concert of church music by the Cathedral choir with accompaniment by mounted hussars blowing military trumpets on 17 July 1842 on the occasion of the laying of the first brick for a new infantry barracks. Also in less experimental performances he liked to set church music to an accompaniment by winds.

He was an accomplished cellist. His works include a trio for three cellos and a quartet for four cellos besides a string quartet and the piano quintet with double bass.

== Works ==
Most of Limmer's works have not appeared in print, and he does not appear to have been very prolific. Hofmeisters Monatsbericht lists only five published compositions (Opp. 10—14), and they are repeated in Pazdírek's Universal-Handbuch der Musikliteratur.

=== Published during lifetime ===
- Op. 10 - String quartet in G major (Vienna: Mechetti, 1829; new edition Munich:Musik Südost)
- Op. 11 - Quartet for four celli in E-flat major, dedicated to Joseph Merk (Vienna: Mechetti, 1830; new edition Amsterdam: A.J.Heuwekemeijer, 1970)
- Op. 12 - Trio for three celli in E minor (Vienna: Mechetti, 1831)
- Op. 13 - Grand Quintet for piano, violin, viola, cello and double bass in D minor, dedicated to Raymund Härtel (Leipzig: Breitkopf und Härtel, 1832)
- Op. 14 - Justus ut palma oder Sancta Maria, Offertorium in A major for soprano or tenor with violin solo, orchestra and organ (Vienna: Diabelli, 1844)

=== Unpublished during lifetime ===
Most of Limmer's unpublished compositions are lost. But some of them were recovered in different archives of Austria and Romania.

- Die Alpenhütte, opera in 3 acts (1845), libretto by Alexander Schmidt (theater director from Temeswar), lost (a piano 4-hands arrangement by Ludwig von Gyika of the overture survived)
- Missa solemnis No. 1 in C major, manuscript recovered in Vienna (according to Dr. Franz Metz, this can be the "D major" mass composed by Limmer when he was only 17 years old)
- Requiem in B major (1842), a complete manuscript found in Temeswar in 1994 (there is also a manuscript vocal score arranged by Ludwig von Gyika, dated 1872)
- Ave Maria for soprano, baritone and orchestra (24—25 January 1842)
- Speciosus forma, offertorium for soprano, horn and orchestra (1842)
- Amavit eum Dominis, offertorium for soprano, clarinet and orchestra (17—18 August 1844)
- Graduale for 4 voices, orchestra and organ
- Ecce sacerdos magnus for chorus, orchestra and organ
- Veni Sancte Spiritus
- Hymni vespertini for tenor and bass soli, 3-part male chorus, 2 horns, 2 violins, bass and organ continuo (1852), for all Sundays and holidays
- Marienlied: Lenke unserer Seelen Hoffnung , sacred hymn (1855)
- Des Freundes Abschied, song, text by V. Mathison (1837), recovered in 2007 in Budapest

==== Lost compositions ====
- 27 responsories for Holy Week for 4 voices and physharmonica (Limmer's last composition)

According to his biographer and personal friend Frigyes Pesty, the following compositions by Limmer were in the Temeswar church archives in 1859 (compositions listed above are omitted from this list):

- Great Mass in G major with full orchestra
- Mass in G major with chamber orchestra
- Great Mass in F major with orchestra
- Missa brevis in B major with chamber orchestra
- Offertorium in F major with obbligato winds
- Ecce sacerdos (a different composition from the one that survived)
- 4 Stations for Corpus Christi with wind accompaniment
- Te Deum with winds
- 2 Hymns Domine non sum dignum, in E-flat major and F major
- Sonata for piano and viola in G minor
- Jubel-Ouvertüre
- Shorter pieces
