= Piano Quintet No. 1 (Dvořák) =

Piano quintet by Antonín Dvořák

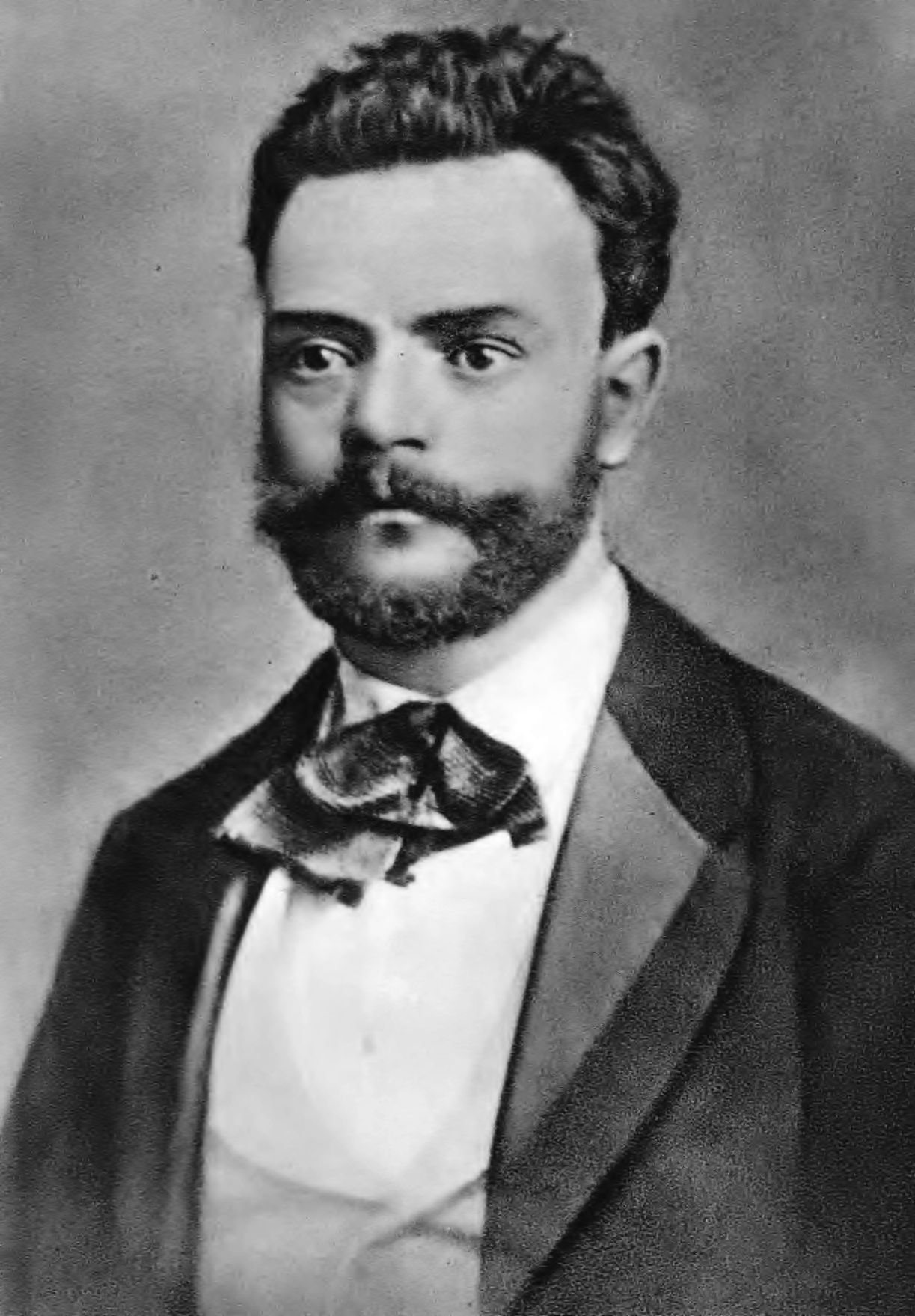
Antonín Dvořák in 1870

The Piano Quintet No. 1 in A major, Op. 5 (B. 28), is a piano quintet by Antonín Dvořák, scored for two violins, viola, cello and piano. Composed in 1872 in Prague, it was premiered in November that year, by Vojtěch Hřímalý, Lederer, Josef Krehan, Alois Neruda, and Karel Slavkovský. It was not published then and Dvořák lost the autograph over the years, having to ask a friend for a copy when he revised the work in 1887. The revised version was not performed until 1922, 18 years after his death.

== Structure ==
The composition consists of three movements:

1. Allegro ma non troppo (A major)
2. Andante sostenuto (F major)
3. Finale. Allegro con brio (A major)

A typical performance takes approximately 28 minutes.
