= Quintet for Piano and Winds (Beethoven) =

Composition by Ludwig van Beethoven

- by Beethoven
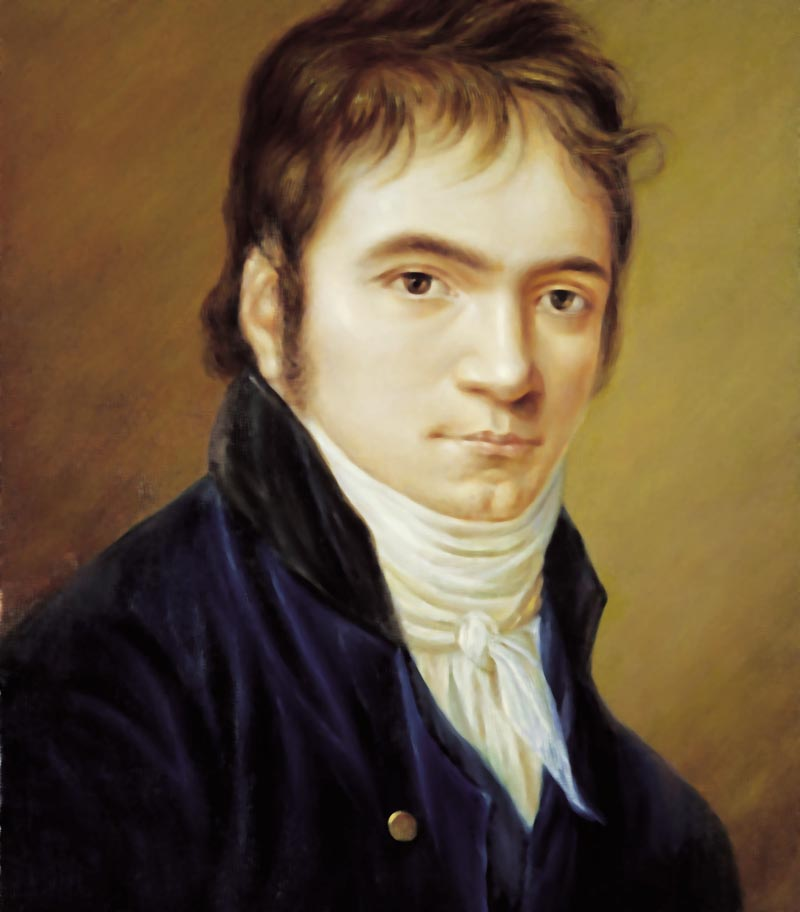
- Key: E♭
- Opus: 16
- Year: 1796
- Period: Classical
- Genre: Chamber Music
- Form: Quintet
- Duration: 23 to 26 minutes
- Movements: 3
- Scoring: Piano, Oboe, Clarinet, Horn, Bassoon

Quintet in E♭ for Piano and Winds, Op. 16, was written by Ludwig van Beethoven in 1796.

The quintet is scored for piano, oboe, clarinet, horn, and bassoon. It is alleged to be inspired by Mozart's Quintet, K. 452 (1784), which has the same scoring and is also in E♭.

== Structure ==
It is in three movements:

1. Grave – Allegro ma non troppo (E♭ major)
2. Andante cantabile (B♭ major)
3. Rondo: Allegro ma non troppo (E♭ major)

The performance takes around 23–27 minutes.

== Transcriptions ==
Beethoven subsequently transcribed the Op. 16 quintet as a quartet for piano and string trio (violin, viola, and cello), using the same opus number, tempo markings, and overall timing.

Artaria published an unauthorized transcription of the Op. 16 quintet as a string quartet which they designated as the composer's Op. 75.
