= Piano Quintet (Shostakovich) =

1940 chamber work by Dmitri Shostakovich

- by Dmitri Shostakovich
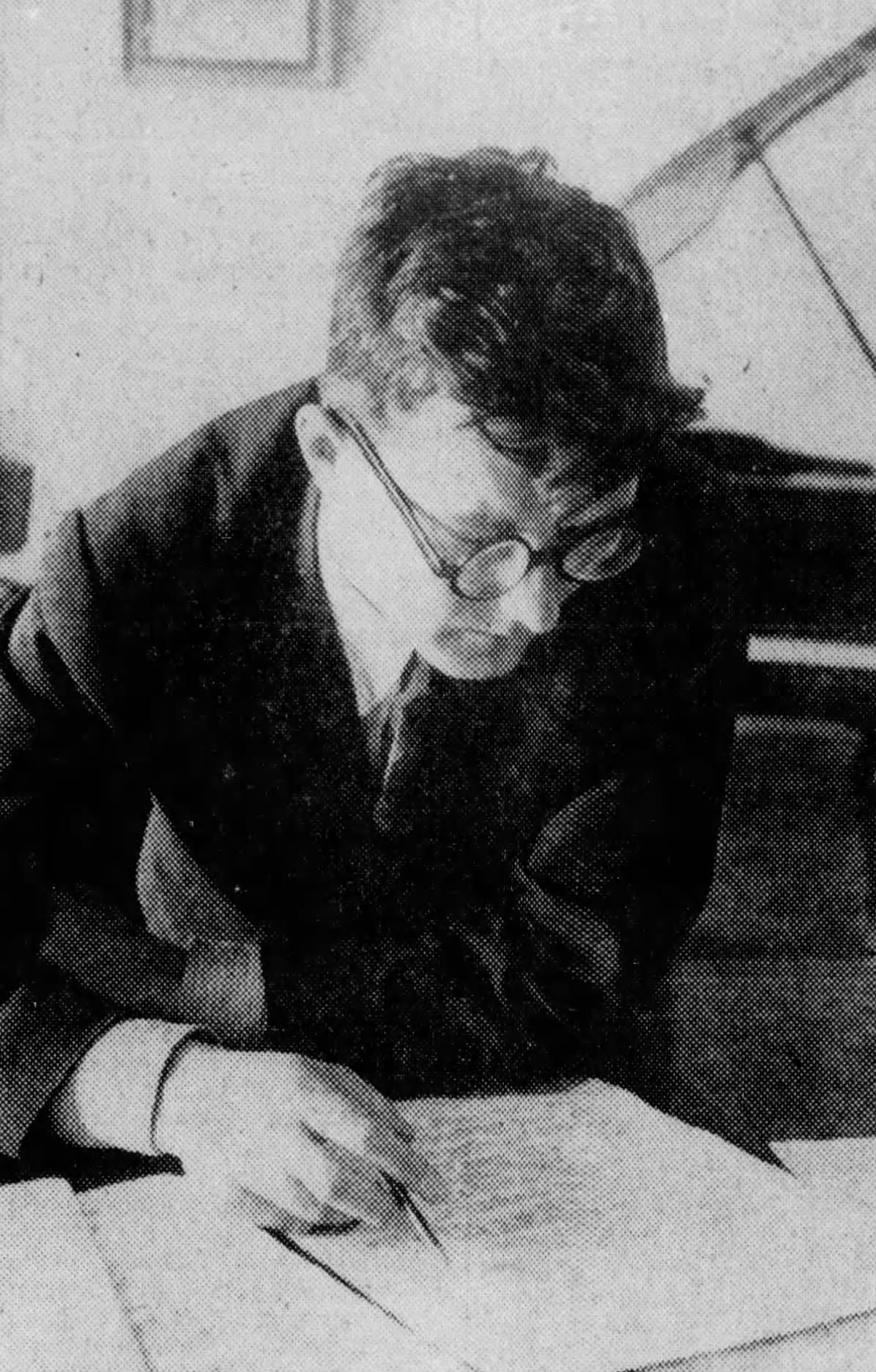
- Shostakovich in 1942
- Key: G minor
- Opus: 57
- Composed: July 13, 1940 – September 14, 1940: Shalovo or Kellomäki; Leningrad, Russian SFSR
- Publisher: Muzgiz; Am-Rus Music Corporation; Edition Peters; Hans Sikorski Musikverlage; Muzyka; DSCH Publishers
- Duration: c. 29 minutes
- Movements: 5

Premiere
- Date: November 23, 1940
- Location: Small Hall of the Moscow Conservatory; Moscow, Russian SFSR
- Performers: Beethoven Quartet; Dmitri Shostakovich (piano)

The Piano Quintet in G minor, Op. 57, is a five-movement composition for two violins, viola, cello, and piano by Dmitri Shostakovich. He composed it between July 13 and September 14, 1940. Sources conflict on where he began to compose it—the location is variously stated to be Shalovo, Kellomäki, or Moscow—but most agree that it was completed in Leningrad. It is the second of Shostakovich's two attempts at composing a piano quintet. His first dated from his student years, but was ultimately abandoned and repurposed in other compositions.

A suggestion from the Beethoven Quartet over dinner in 1938 led to the creation of the Piano Quintet. Originally, Shostakovich had conceived the work as a string quartet. However, according to Isaak Glikman, an arts critic and close friend, Shostakovich modified the instrumentation because he hoped that demand for his performances as pianist would result in increased opportunities for personal travel. According to the musicologist Richard Taruskin, Shostakovich modeled his Piano Quintet, including its key and use of Baroque musical forms, on Sergei Taneyev's. Over the years, a number of small alterations to the score were made, which are documented in the two recordings of the work that Shostakovich made with the Beethoven Quartet in 1940 and 1955.

The Piano Quintet's official premiere on November 23, 1940, at the Small Hall of the Moscow Conservatory was an immediate public success. Encores at this and subsequent concerts became so commonplace, that it quickly became a source of jokes for wags who referred to the work as a five-movement work with seven movements. Occasionally, audiences demanded encores of the entire work. Performances of the Piano Quintet took up so much of Shostakovich's time between late 1940 and mid-1941 that he had only enough time to compose a single work during that period.

Opinions were more mixed among Shostakovich's professional colleagues. Sergei Prokofiev and Aleksandr Goldenweiser both were ambivalent about the music's merits, while the musicologist Daniel Zhitomirsky defended the work against detractors who had simplistic expectations from Soviet music. Even before the Piano Quintet's official premiere, it had been nominated for the inaugural Stalin Prize, along with works by Prokofiev, Nikolai Myaskovsky, and Aram Khachaturian. After three rounds of voting by the prize committee—as well as an unsuccessful last-minute personal appeal to Joseph Stalin from a disgruntled CPSU member who sought to deny the work a prize—the March 16, 1941 issue of Pravda announced that the Piano Quintet won in the first-class category. Its monetary award of 100,000 rubles attracted significant commentary from music critics in the United States after the work's stateside premiere in Carnegie Hall on April 29, 1941.

== Background ==
=== First attempt at a quintet ===
Shostakovich first attempted to compose a piano quintet during his student years. This earlier quintet was conceived in the early 1920s; by April 9, 1923, he completed its first movement and designated the work "op. 7". A subsequent movement, subtitled "Fantastic Scherzo", was also planned, but the idea of a piano quintet was soon abandoned. Instead, he developed the "Fantastic Scherzo" into the Scherzo for piano and orchestra, which kept the projected quintet's op. 7 assignation, while the remaining music was repurposed in the Piano Trio No. 1.

He also composed music for piano with string quartet in his score to the 1936 film, Girlfriends.

=== Partnership with the Beethoven Quartet ===
One of the most enduring professional and personal relationships Shostakovich had was that between him and the Beethoven Quartet. Of the composer's fifteen string quartets, the Beethoven Quartet premiered all but the first and last. Aside from the Piano Quintet, their members also participated in the premiere of the Piano Trio No. 2. Karina Balasanyan, a Russian musicologist, said that the closeness of their partnership, rare in music history, led the Beethoven Quartet to become "emissaries of [Shostakovich's] will".

On December 26, 1933, during their tenth season in existence, the Beethoven Quartet programmed music by Shostakovich for the first time: a joint performance with the Glière Quartet of the Two Pieces for String Octet. It was not until 1938, however, when they played the Moscow premiere of Shostakovich's String Quartet No. 1 that his music became a permanent part of their repertory.

=== Origins and composition ===
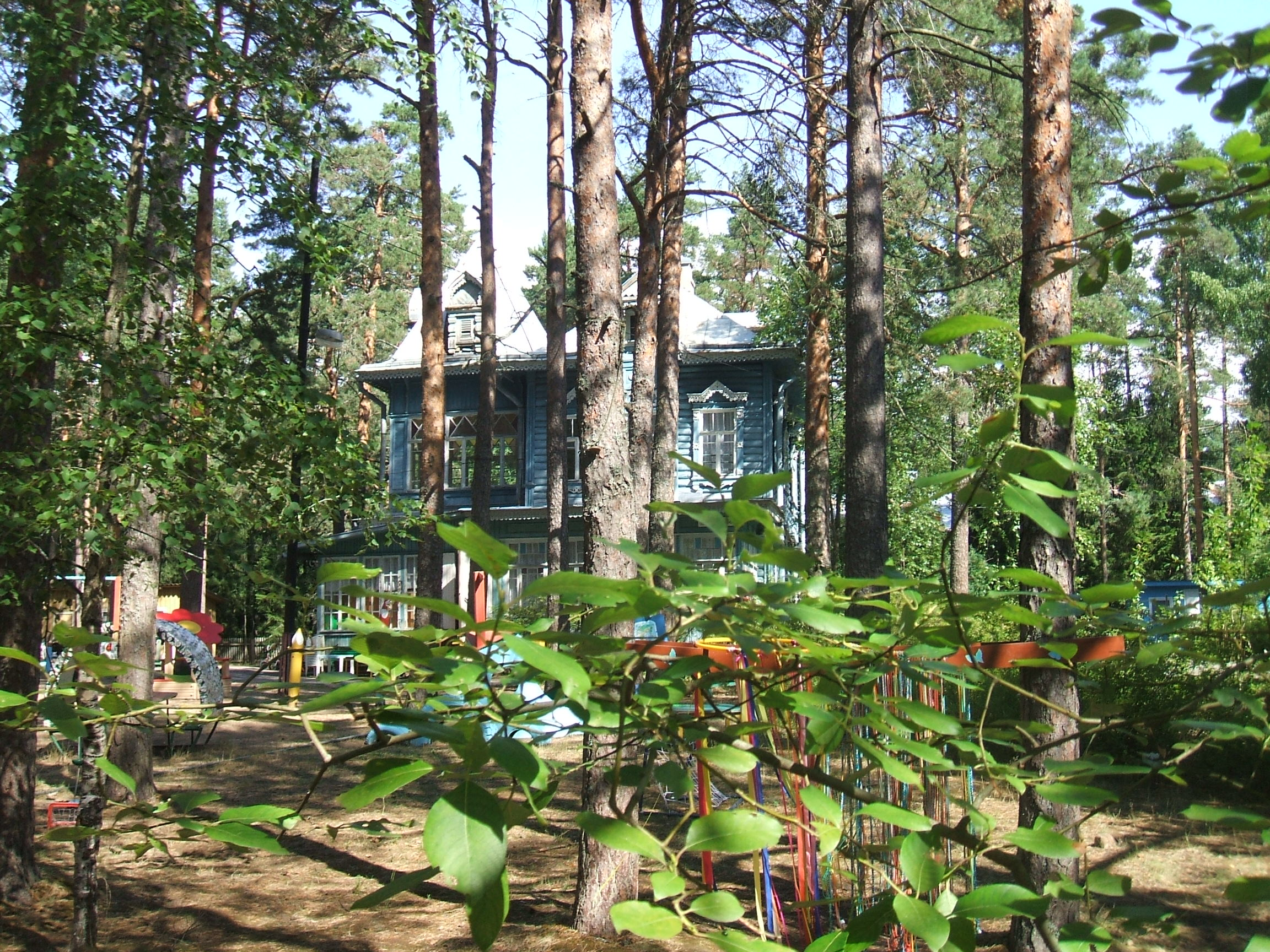
Shostakovich's summer dacha in Kellomäki (present-day Komarovo)

During a celebratory dinner in Moscow on November 16, 1938, that followed the local premiere of the String Quartet No. 1, the Beethoven Quartet suggested to Shostakovich the idea of composing a piano quintet. A few months later in 1939, Shostakovich replied in the affirmative to the Beethoven Quartet's first violinist, Dmitri Tsyganov: "I will certainly write a quintet and I will play it with you". Isaak Glikman, an arts critic and close friend of Shostakovich, related that the Piano Quintet had originally been planned as a string quartet, but that external considerations influenced the composer to alter the instrumentation:

His explanation of the change [in instrumentation] was idiosyncratic, to say the least. According to him, his change of heart had not been dominated by artistic considerations at all, but purely practical concerns. "Do you want to know why I wrote a piano part into the quartet? I did it so that I could play it myself and have a reason to go on tour to different towns and places. So now ... the Beethoven Quartet, who get to go everywhere, will have to take me with them, and I will get my chance to see the world as well!" We both laughed. "You are not serious?", I said. Shostakovich replied: "Absolutely! You are a dyed-in-the-wool stay-at-home, but I am a dyed-in-the-wool wanderer!"

Shostakovich's official biographer, Sofia Khentova, said that Shostakovich was also moved to compose the Piano Quintet out of his desire to enrich the field of chamber music with elements of symphonic music.

Enthusiasm for the Piano Quintet notwithstanding, Shostakovich did not find the time to begin work on it until July 1940. He wrote to Vasily Shirinsky, the Beethoven Quartet's second violinist, that he started work on his new composition on July 13. In a subsequent letter to Shirinsky dated August 6, Shostakovich reiterated that he was looking forward to playing the work with the Beethoven Quartet soon, even though he had never played as part of a quintet before.

Sources agree on the timeframe of the composition, but not location. Gerard McBurney, Laurel Fay, Marina Raku, and Vera Zaitseva state that the Piano Quintet was begun in Shalovo (today part of the town of Luga) and completed in Leningrad. Derek C. Hulme cited Moscow as the location of composition. Khentova said that in July 1940, Shostakovich traveled from Gaspra in Crimea, where he completed his orchestration of Modest Mussorgsky's Boris Godunov, to vacation in the village of Kellomäki (present-day Komarovo). There, he rented a two-story cottage and settled in to work. With few residents and visitors, Shostakovich was able to compose the Piano Quintet in secluded surroundings without disturbances. He completed the score on September 14, 1940, in Leningrad and a copy for performance and publication was immediately prepared.

Shostakovich introduced the Beethoven Quartet to the Piano Quintet on September 17. He invited them, as well as the pianists Lev Oborin and Konstantin Igumnov, to listen to his playthrough of the work on the piano.

Preparations for the Piano Quintet's official premiere began on October 22 at a practice room in the Moscow Conservatory. Tsyganov recalled Shostakovich's method of collaborative rehearsal: "First, he played his new piece on the piano from the score; then he distributed the various parts to us, always requesting strongly that we not begin rehearsing without him". Rehearsals typically began late at night, usually around 11:00 p.m., and lasted until the following morning.

== Music ==
=== Structure ===
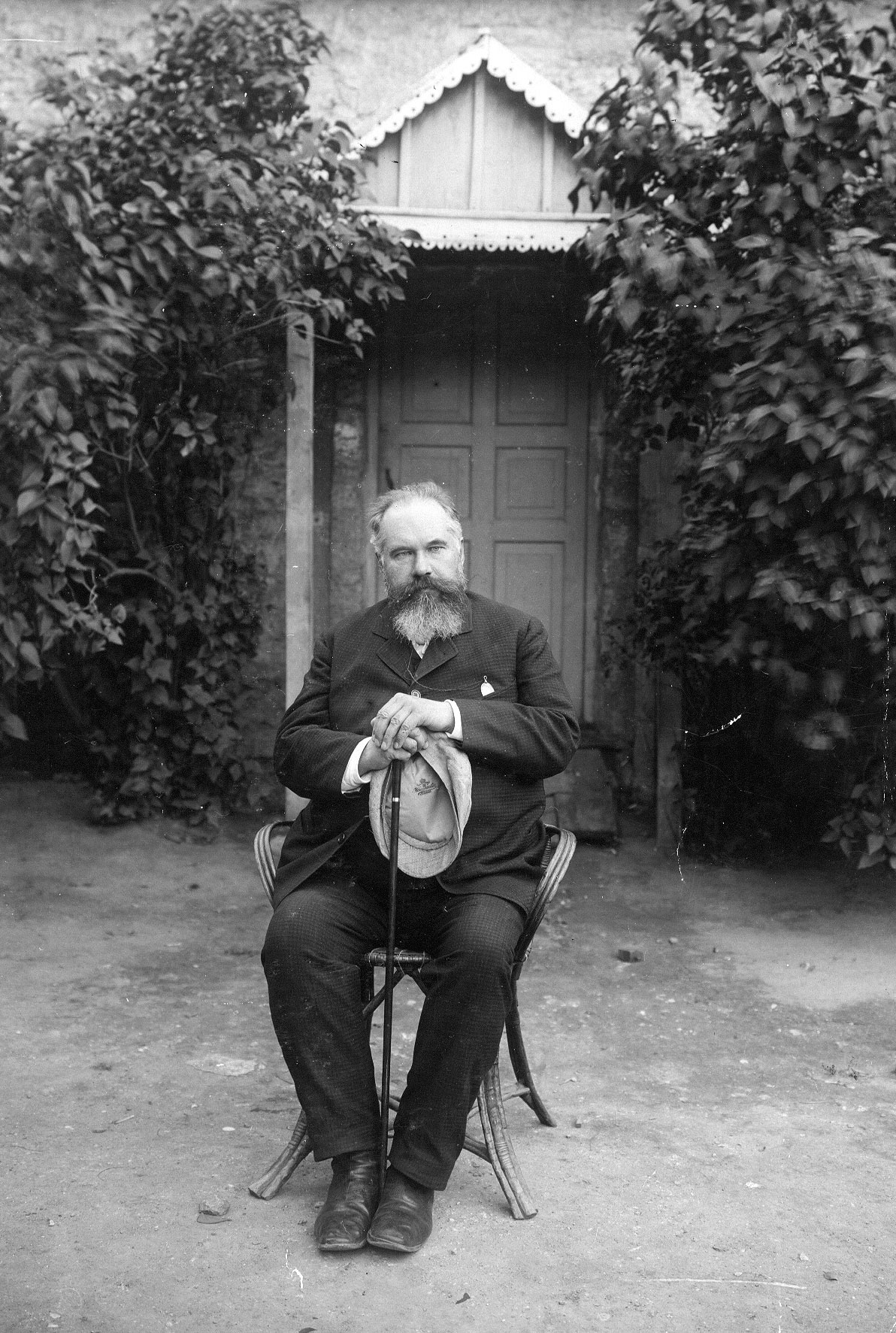
Shostakovich is believed to have modeled his Piano Quintet on that by Sergei Taneyev

The Piano Quintet consists of five movements:

1. Prelude: Lento ( = 72) — Poco più mosso (. = 72) — Lento ( = 58) (attacca)
2. Fugue: Adagio ( = 84)
3. Scherzo: Allegretto (. = 84)
4. Intermezzo: Lento ( = 72) (attacca)
5. Finale: Allegretto ( = 96)

The musicologist Michael Mishra said that the structure of the Piano Quintet, with a pair of connected movements pivoting around a central scherzo, superficially resembled that of Gustav Mahler's Symphony No. 5, although he noted that Shostakovich did not imitate its distribution of weight. Richard Taruskin, another musicologist, posited that Shostakovich clearly invoked the Piano Quintet of another Russian composer, Sergei Taneyev. He listed as evidence the fact that both quartets reference Baroque musical forms and share the same key. "Taneyev was the very model of an academic composer", he said, "and in emulating him via his Piano Quintet, Shostakovich was characterizing himself the same way, which as we know by now signaled a big change of direction". Each movement, according to Khentova, develops internal emotions within an overall symphonic structure.

A typical performance of the Piano Quintet lasts approximately 29 minutes.

=== Description ===
Shostakovich's Piano Quintet opens with a "Prelude": a construction in ternary form that fuses neo-Baroque and Romantic elements. The choice of title was not invoked out of convenience, but as a token of the composer's deep engagement with Baroque music. Mishra described the movement as "essentially a prolongation of the G tonic". He also likened the movement's close to a "grand cadential 'spinning out' of the sort frequently found at the end of a Bach prelude".

This is succeeded without pause by the "Fugue", the first of four that Shostakovich composed in the 1940s. Khentova characterized it as "philosophical", while Fay wrote that its "polyphonic mastery [was] worthy of Bach". A rising three-note figure that appeared in the closing measures of the "Prelude" resurges in the second measure of the "Fugue", making both movements an integrated unit that anticipates the 24 Preludes and Fugues. Both movements also forecast inflections that Shostakovich would later use in his Jewish-inspired works, such as the Piano Trio No. 2. As the movement builds to a climax, Shostakovich abandons the fugal form in favor of homophonic textures that make a more immediate emotive impact. Recitatives for piano, then cello follow suit, before the fugue resumes in stretto. Mishra wrote of the "Fugue":

The form of this movement may be somewhat unusual, but it does serve a clear expressive goal—setting the inexorable momentum, texture, and procedures into a larger psychological profile that, with its central climax and gradual withering away, is less typically "fugal" and more akin to a Shostakovich symphonic slow movement (that of the Fifth Symphony, for example).

The "Scherzo", which has been described as a "fast ländler" and whose tempo establishes a loose relation to equivalent movements in the String Quartet No. 1 and Sixth Symphony, is the center of the Piano Quintet. Rhythms associated with Spanish dances, which feature regularly in Shostakovich's music, are incorporated into the trio.

Evocations of Baroque music return in the "Intermezzo", which at first gives the impression of a passacaglia before diverging from the procedures used in that musical form. Nevertheless, the music makes allusions to Henry Purcell, the "Air" from Bach's Orchestral Suite No. 3 in D major, and Edvard Grieg's Holberg Suite; the latter itself an homage to musical forms from the past.

Contrasting sharply with the preceding movements is the lighter tone of the "Finale". Mishra said that although its coda does not strive for the transcendence that typifies the work as a whole, the "Finale" can be heard as the first of a type of ending movement that Shostakovich would explore in his later works, "where predominantly lightweight material becomes sublimated in the coda to achieve an enigmatic, but highly poignant sense of resignation". Ian MacDonald, on the other hand, noted that emotionally and structurally the "Finale" was "as disjunctive as that of the Sixth Symphony".

=== Later amendments ===
	Tempo marking in 1940 autograph score	Tempo marking in 1956 published score	Tempo in Shostakovich's 1940 recording	Tempo in Shostakovich's 1955 recording
I. Prelude	= 58 — (rehearsal number 3) = 52	= 72 — (rehearsal number 3) = 72	= 53 — (rehearsal number 3) = 45	= 72 — (rehearsal number 3) = 61
II. Fugue	= 72	= 84	= 58	= 75
III. Scherzo	= 160	. = 84	. = 74	. = 88
IV. Intermezzo	= 72	= 72	= 57	= 71
V. Finale	Moderato poco allegretto; = 72	Allegretto; = 96	= 86	= 96

A number of small alterations were made to the score of the Piano Quintet in the years immediately following its premiere. Valentin Berlinsky recalled that he and his fellow Borodin Quartet members were admonished by Shostakovich for slowing down through a particular passage in the "Prelude" during a 1947 rehearsal of the Piano Quintet. When they protested that a ritenuto was indicated in that passage, he walked up to them, brandished a pen, and crossed out the marking from each one of their parts.

The Borodin Quartet was also the instigator of a more significant modification, this time in the "Finale". Whether it was the result of an accident or direct suggestion is disputed, but it resulted in a portion of music which originally had the viola and cello playing in unison changed to an imitative dialogue.

Tempi were also modified between the original manuscript and the 1956 published edition, possibly to suit Shostakovich's own pianism, which inclined to very fast tempi, an aspect repeatedly criticized by his chamber music partners. According to a member of the Glazunov Quartet, Shostakovich "accentuated the constructive, motor elements [of the Piano Quintet], and achieved his effect through clarity and the flow of the music". These differences in tempi are documented in both of Shostakovich's commercial recordings of the Piano Quintet. As Tsyganov observed:

Shostakovich was an unsurpassed performer of his own solo and chamber work, playing them, as a composer of genius, in his own unique way—his approach then became the ideal for all performers. It was impossible to differentiate his compositions from his interpretations, as was also the case for those of Medtner, Rachmaninoff, and Prokofiev.

Overall, the 1940 recording is often slower than the metronome markings indicated in the score; the musicologist Sofia Moshevich called it a "raw and still imperfect interpretive sketch". Shostakovich evinced a desire to press the tempo in a number of places, but was held back by the "safe" pace set by the Beethoven Quartet. By contrast, the fleet tempi of the 1955 recording, which Moshevich describes as "polished and refined", were subsequently incorporated into the 1956 published score.

=== Manuscripts ===
A preliminary sketch piano score of the first three movements and fair manuscript of the entire Piano Quintet survive. Sketches for the last two movements, however, are presumed lost. The extant sketches consist of four sheets of slightly yellowed music paper that bear the title "Rough Draft of the Quintet" and notations in purple ink. Tempi and ordinal numberings are only accorded therein to the "Fugue". Dating for the sketches of what would become the "Prelude" suggest that the movement was composed in a single day on July 16, 1940. A fragment for an early version of the "Scherzo" is crossed out in black and red pencil.

The fair copy of the Piano Quintet is notated with black ink on 38 sheets of 14-staff music paper that is slightly yellowed. A few errors are crossed out; there are also further markings in pencil and red and green inks. The score is stored in the archives of the Russian National Museum of Music.

== Premieres ==
On November 23, 1940, the Piano Quintet's official premiere occurred at the Small Hall of the Moscow Conservatory; the performers were the Beethoven Quartet, with Shostakovich at the piano. Their performance was part of a ten-day festival of Soviet music.

Preceding that concert was an informal premiere in Leningrad on October 1 at the Leningrad branch of the Union of Soviet Composers. On that occasion, Shostakovich was joined by the Glazunov Quartet, the ensemble that had premiered his String Quartet No. 1. Another performance with the Beethoven Quartet and Shostakovich followed on November 12, that time in Moscow for the Stalin Prize committee.

The American premiere of the Piano Quintet, played by the Stuyvesant Quartet with pianist Vivian Rifkin, took place at Carnegie Hall in New York City on April 29, 1941. It was part of an all-Russian program sponsored by the American Russian Institute that also included performances by Vytautas Bacevičius, Andor Földes, Benny Goodman, and Paul Robeson.

=== First recordings ===
On December 10, 1940, between 1:30 a.m. and 7:30 a.m., the Beethoven Quartet and Shostakovich recorded the Piano Quintet at the House of Scientists in Moscow. Their recording, made on magnetic film, was intended solely for radio broadcast. It was not available commercially until it was issued on CD in 1993 by the Czech label Multisonic.

The first commercial recording of the Piano Quintet was a set of four 78 RPM discs made by the Stuyvesant Quartet and Vivian Rifkin for Columbia Records that was issued in February 1942.

== Publication ==
Muzgiz published the first edition of the score in 1941, a photocopy of which was published by the Am-Rus Music Corporation for sale in North America. Subsequent editions were published by Edition Peters, Hans Sikorski Musikverlage, Muzyka, and DSCH Publishers.

== Reception ==
=== In the Soviet Union ===
Tsyganov later said that the premiere "without exaggeration was a triumph"; the audience demanded encores of the last three movements. David Rabinovich, who wrote a biography on Shostakovich that was approved by the composer, was among the audience at the Piano Quintet's official premiere in 1940:

One cannot forget the atmosphere that reigned in the [Small Hall] of the Moscow Conservatory during the premiere of the Quintet. It came at the end of a concert after three new quartets by three leading Soviet composers had been played. The audience was growing tired. But when the Beethoven Quartet, so well-known to Moscow music-lovers, appeared on the stage with Shostakovich himself, and when the first strains of the Quintet resounded, all workaday, dearly-beloved, and accustomed sensations disappeared without leaving a trace. Obviously something important was happening in the hall, something that was outside the scope of "current" musical events.

After the concert, Shostakovich, who was "very pale, very excited", visited his friend Marietta Shaginyan. "I have been so shaken by the success of the Quintet that I could not go home immediately after the concert", she recorded him saying in her diary. "Instead, I have been wandering the streets of Moscow—my soul filled with bliss".

Critics and audiences alike received the Piano Quintet enthusiastically; demand for performances from all over the Soviet Union was intense. Tickets for performances sold out before posters advertising the events could be set up. Audiences at the work's early performances often requested individual movements as encores; occasionally, they insisted that the entire work be repeated. Encores of the "Scherzo" and "Finale" were so commonplace that wags referred to the work as "a piece in five movements of which there are seven". Performances of the Piano Quintet occupied Shostakovich to the extent that in the period from its premiere until mid-1941, he was able to compose only a single work.

Within the Soviet musical establishment, occasional suspicion and hostility to Shostakovich's Piano Quintet mingled with general approval. One of the composers who publicly stated their ambivalent feelings was Sergei Prokofiev, whose remarks were published in the February 1941 issue of Sovyetskaya Muzyka. He commented favorably on the work's architectural clarity and balancing of instrumental voices. Of all the movements, Prokofiev held the "Fugue" as the "best and most interesting" in the Piano Quintet. "One has to hand it to Shostakovich: in his fugue, as far as the general impression it makes, there is an unusual amount that's new", he said. "I don't even know whether it's a good fugue from the technical standpoint. But musically it's good". Prokofiev interspersed his compliments with objections against the Piano Quintet's length, accusations that Shostakovich trafficked in clichéd mannerisms and sounded geriatric in spite of his youth, and insinuations that the work's rapturous reception with Soviet audiences betrayed their unsophistication. He concluded that the Piano Quintet was "a remarkable composition", but in the same closing sentence added that it "lacked momentum and climaxes".

A contrasting article by the musicologist Daniel Zhitomirsky was published in the same issue of Sovyetskaya Muzyka. Acknowledging that the Piano Quintet "aroused in certain musicians a spirit of opposition toward Shostakovich", he criticized the work's detractors for their simplistic expectations of Soviet music. He also addressed misgivings he heard from some of his colleagues concerning the work's "great and authentic feelings" being filtered "through a prism of thought":

This type of art may of course provide the highest aesthetic enjoyment, but not always with blazing immediacy, nor will it be attainable at all levels of musical discernment. This last [point] is very important. Sometimes we tend to equate the idea of what is democratic (or belonging to the people) in art with what is immediately comprehensible. But from that standpoint many of the greatest achievements of human culture will seem antidemocratic, for far from all of them, even in our country, the most democratic in the world, are truly accessible (in the sense of being capable of complete inner assimilation) by a wide audience. Do we need this intellectual type of art? Of course we do: it is needed and deeply to be valued, as a particular artistic genre, alongside other genres, neither replacing them nor contradicting them.

Maximilian Steinberg, Shostakovich's former composition teacher, noted in his diary that the Piano Quintet was "an outstanding work of the Soviet chamber music literature" which throughout displayed "wonderful mastery".

=== Stalin Prize ===
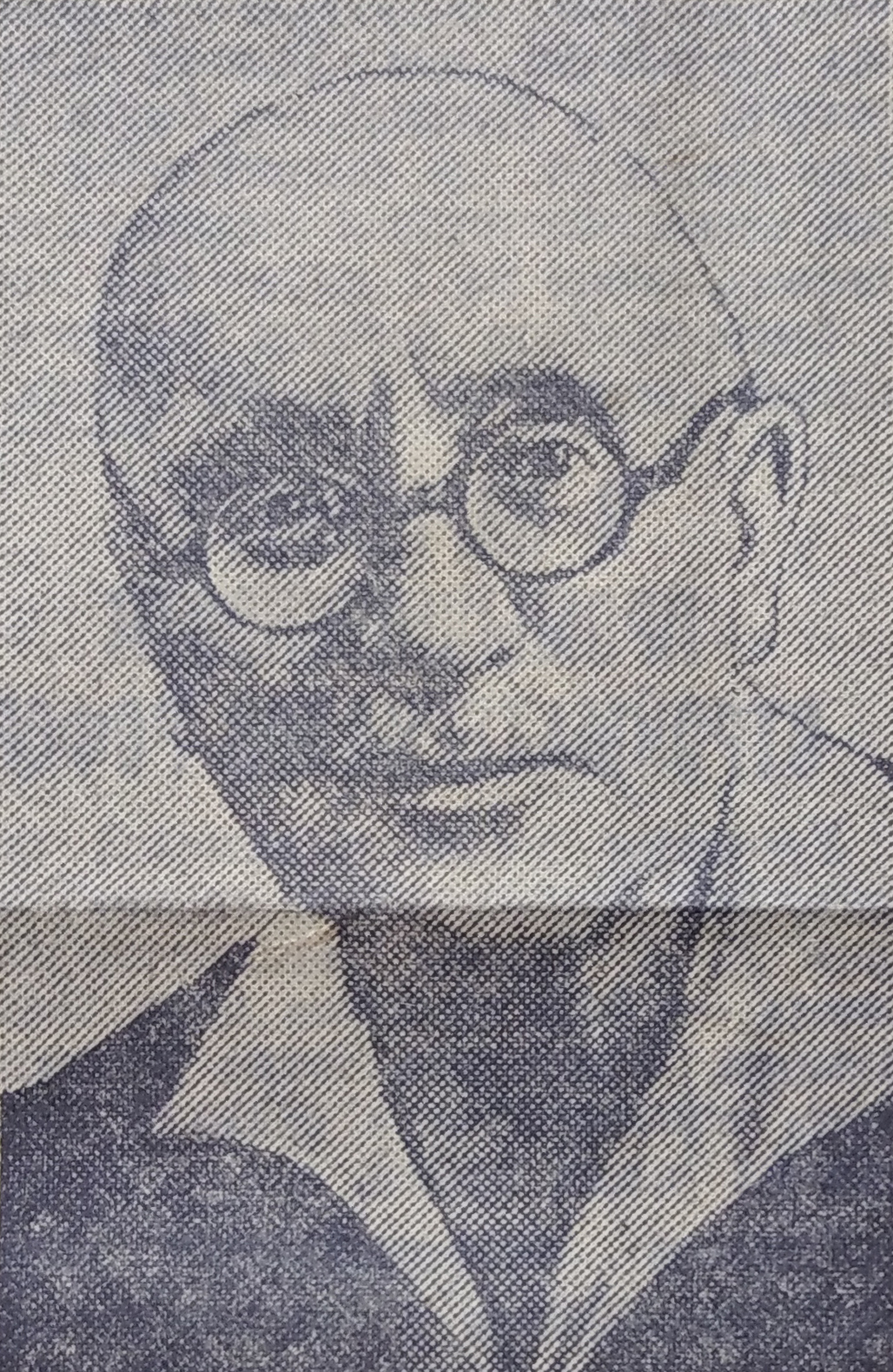
The painter Igor Grabar (pictured in 1939) advocated for the Piano Quintet in the Stalin Prize committee

==== Deliberations ====
After the Piano Quintet was first played for the Stalin Prize committee by the Beethoven Quartet and Shostakovich on November 12, 1940, another performance for members of the Union of Soviet Composers occurred on November 19. At the time, Shostakovich had not yet been as favored by the Soviet government as he would become after the 1942 premiere of his Symphony No. 7. Moreover, the committee was disinclined to place Shostakovich above older and established contenders. Consequently, in early deliberations the Piano Quintet was ranked below another prize nominee, the Symphony No. 21 by Nikolai Myaskovsky. Other first-round contenders included the Violin Concerto by Aram Khachaturian and the opera Semyon Kotko by Prokofiev.

Members of the music section of the prize committee included Myaskovsky, Aleksandr Goldenweiser, Yuri Shaporin, Isaak Dunayevsky, Samuil Samosud, and Mikhail Khrapchenko; the latter chairman of the Committee on Arts Affairs. Leading the panel was Reinhold Glière. Goldenweiser tempered his cautious praise of Shostakovich with criticism of the "Scherzo" and "Finale". He specifically drew attention to "deliberately grotesque passages" in the former that he negatively likened to the composer's earlier work prior to his 1936 censure. Another committee member, the painter Igor Grabar, refuted his colleague's criticisms:

When I was listening to Shostakovich's Quintet, I had the feeling that I was not among contemporary composers, but among the great masters. I was completely shaken—no, I was crushed. I had the feeling that I was back in Mozart's time... This work is stamped with the seal of genius. How could we not give it a prize! At the dawn of my life, I was lucky enough to have known Tchaikovsky ... and at my life's sunset, I live in the time of Shostakovich.

On the morning of November 25, a brief article by Alexander Shaverdyan published in Pravda praised the Piano Quintet as the "best work of 1940". Because of Shaverdyan's position as editor of Sovyetskoye Iskusstvo, his endorsement was interpreted by readers as representing the official opinion of the Committee on Arts Affairs and its chairman, Khrapchenko. Concerned that the article was intended to influence the results of the prize committee's first round of voting, which were scheduled to take place later that same day, Goldenweiser immediately contacted the editorial board of Pravda with his disapproval. Shostakovich's Piano Quintet lost to Myaskovsky's Symphony No. 21 by a single vote in the first round of voting. Reticence towards Shostakovich from the music section contrasted with the strong support he received from non-musicians in the prize committee.

Developments that transpired in other Stalin Prize categories at the end of 1940 resulted in the Politburo approving an expansion of the music section's prizes from one to five and permission for the prize committee to consider awards for works composed as far back as 1935. Ultimately, the music sections's allotment of prizes was increased to eight: three for first prize and five for second. The new rules not only permitted the retention of Shostakovich and Myaskovsky on the short list of nominees, but momentarily led to the consideration of the former's Symphony No. 5 instead of the Piano Quintet. This idea was quickly discarded because the committee believed that the later work better exemplified Shostakovich's musical reformation since 1936. Shostakovich and Myaskovsky tied in the second round of voting held on January 4, 1941.

==== Dissent ====
A conjectural threat to the Piano Quintet's fortunes came in the form of a letter addressed to Joseph Stalin, dated January 7, 1941. Its author, Moisei Grinberg, was a pianist and CPSU member born in Rostov-on-Don. Formerly the head of the State Committee on Music Institutions and editor-in-chief of Muzgiz, he was deposed from both positions during the Great Purges. He was thereafter allowed to remain a member of the CPSU, but in lower level employment. In 1941, he was the deputy artistic director of the Stanislavsky Opera Theatre and a junior editor at Sovyetskaya Muzyka. Therefore, according to the musicologist Marina Frolova-Walker, Grinberg "was no random malcontent": his letter was an attempt at personal rehabilitation and ingratiation with the authorities.

Grinberg protested to Stalin that "certain unhealthy tendencies" were emerging in Soviet music. One of the targets of his complaints was Shostakovich's Piano Quintet:

...So much of [it] is contrived and there are so many abstract formal quests and so little of genuine beauty and strength ... [It] may stand out for its formal perfection, but this form is nourished by rationalism and the air of the hothouse, rather than by any living human energy. This is music that lacks any connection with the life of the People.

Rather than commending the neoclassicism that had made the work widely liked, Grinberg contented that this trait was proof of its "deeply Western orientation". No personal malice towards Shostakovich was intended, Grinberg said; he suggested that the Stalin Prize should go to his Symphony No. 5 instead. Professional nepotism and privileged seclusion from the general musical audience, Grinberg additionally suggested, resulted in the prize committee's unsatisfactory choices of candidates. He closed his letter with a plea for Stalin's personal supervision of Soviet music.

Extant evidence indicates that Grinberg's letter never reached Stalin, who likely never heard Shostakovich's Piano Quintet and customarily remained aloof from matters pertaining to music.

==== Award ====
The Piano Quintet was awarded a Stalin Prize, first class in the third and final round of voting; the results were publicly announced in Pravda on March 16, 1941. First class prizes were worth 100,000 rubles. Average monthly salaries for manual workers and heads of university departments at the time were 300 and 1,500 rubles respectively.

=== In the United States ===
American journalists in the wake of the stateside premiere of the Piano Quintet frequently commented on the monetary award the work earned with its Stalin Prize; the Pittsburgh Sun Telegraph called it "the most expensive piece of chamber music ever composed". In 1941, Howard Taubman of the New York Times estimated that the Stalin Prize money was worth US$20,000 (equivalent to $437,783 in 2025). "There are few, if any, compositions in history that have brought their composer as much at one swoop", he said in his review of the American premiere, before expressing skepticism of the work's monetary worth. Taubman, nevertheless, commended the music, which he said was stylistically similar to Shostakovich's Symphony No. 5, as "engaging" and "strong". He named the recording of the Piano Quintet made by the Stuyvesant Quartet and Rifkin as one of the best albums of 1942.
