= Quintet for Piano and Winds (Mozart) =

1784 composition by W. A. Mozart

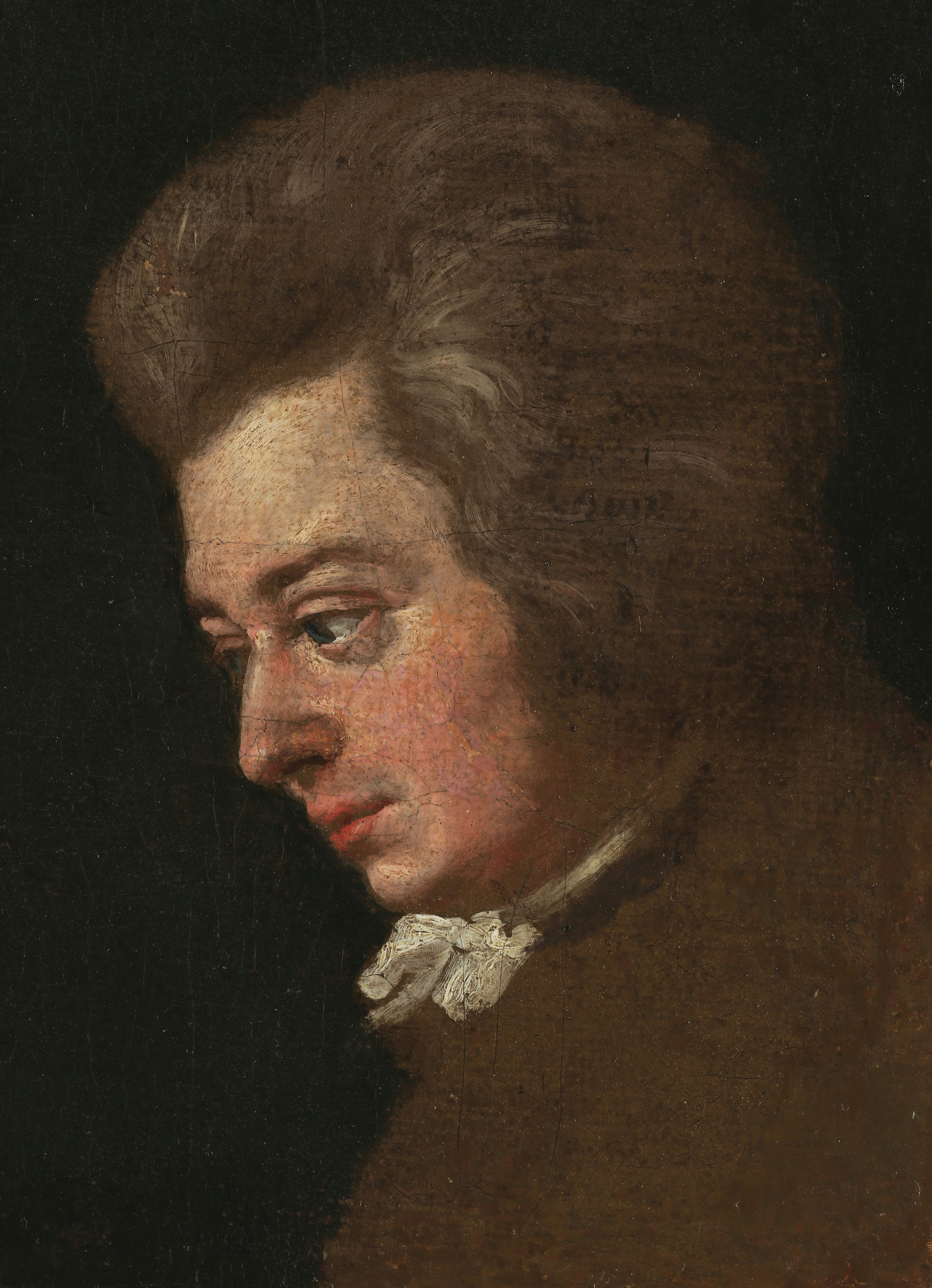
Detail of Lange's 1782–83 Mozart portrait

The Quintet for Piano and Winds in E♭ major, K. 452, was composed by Wolfgang Amadeus Mozart, who entered it in his catalogue of works on 30 March 1784. It was premiered two days later at the Imperial Royal Court Theatre in Vienna. Shortly after the premiere, Mozart wrote to his father that "I myself consider it to be the best thing I have written in my life." It is scored for piano, oboe, clarinet, horn and bassoon. Sarah Adams notes that "The four dissimilar wind timbres pitted against the piano in this extraordinary work must have posed Mozart with a compositional challenge. He contended with the instrumental balance by constructing themes easily divisible into small motifs and by changing textural groupings every few bars for a kaleidoscopic array of tone colours."

== Music ==
1. Largo – Allegro moderato

2. Larghetto

3. Allegretto
Performed by Neal O'Doan (piano) with the Soni Ventorum Wind Quintet

There are three movements:

1. Largo – Allegro moderato (E♭ major,)
2. Larghetto (B♭ major, 3/8)
3. Allegretto (E♭ major,)

The first movement is in sonata form. It opens with a slow introduction, marked Largo. After the slow section cadences on a B♭ dominant chord with a fermata (where the pianist will often improvise an Eingang), the movement's main theme appears featuring solo piano and is taken up by the winds a few bars later. The theme appears in the development with the piano in A♭ major, B♭ minor, C minor, and then in C major by the oboe. The movement ends with two E♭ major chords.

The second movement is often marked Larghetto, but the indication is missing from the autograph. The opening theme is played by the winds at the beginning of the movement but by the piano in the recapitulation. The development, after spending one bar on a German augmented sixth chord with a root of C, abruptly goes into the distant key of E minor for one bar, and four bars later, ends up back in the home B♭ major.

The third movement, marked Allegretto, is a five-part rondo (in A–B–A–C–A form), with the primary theme played first by piano solo and then by the winds shortly thereafter. After the B section, which is primarily in B♭ major, the A theme returns for a second time. Towards the end of the C section, the piano and winds play a E♭ major I^{6}_{4} chord with a fermata, prompting a cadenza. Unlike the concertos Mozart wrote in this time period, this cadenza is played by all five instruments. It is not until some time of cadenza-like material has passed that the third appearance of A is heard. After many bars of piano, the movement ends on two tutti E♭ major chords. The ending of the piece was rewritten by a person other than Mozart, but since the autograph is accessible, the attempted forgery was discovered and corrected.

This piece was allegedly the inspiration for the Quintet in E♭ for Piano and Winds, Op. 16 by Ludwig van Beethoven, who composed his tribute in 1796. The compositions share their key and scoring. Eduard de Lannoy too composed a quintet in E♭ for the same ensemble.

In 1995, French composer Jean Françaix arranged the quintet to a nonet (oboe, clarinet in B♭, horn in E♭, bassoon, 2 violins, viola, cello and double bass), reworking the piano part for the strings.
