= List of compositions by Ernest Bloch =

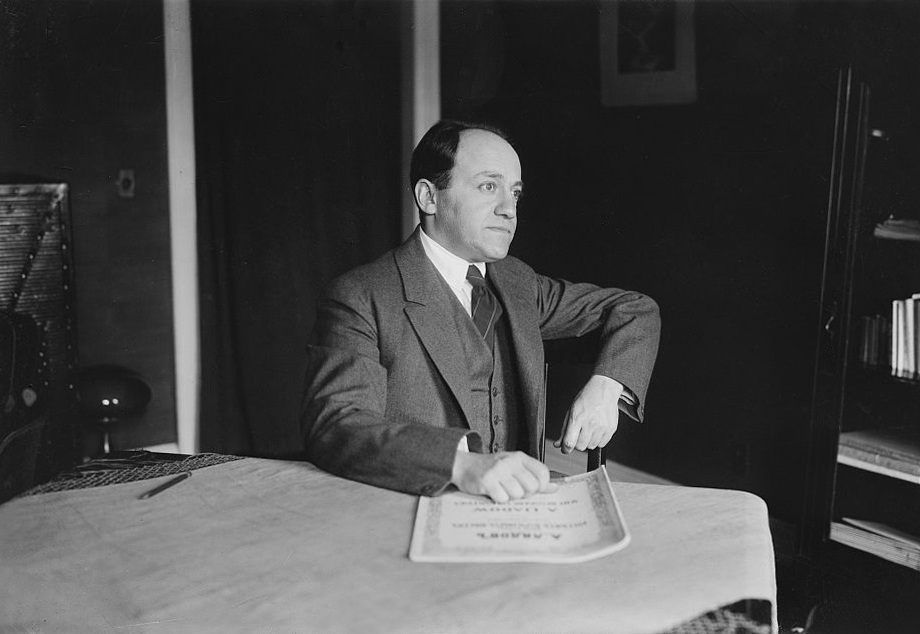
Bloch in 1917

This is a list of compositions by composer Ernest Bloch.

== Stage ==
- Macbeth, Opera in 3 acts (1909 Geneva-Paris)

== Orchestral ==
- Symphony in C♯ minor (1902)
- Hiver-Printemps (1905 Paris-Geneva)
- Trois Poèmes Juifs for large orchestra (1913 Satigny)
- Israel, Symphony for orchestra (1916 Geneva)
- In the Night: A Love Poem (1922 Cleveland)
- Poems of the Sea (1922 Cleveland)
- Concerto Grosso No. 1 for string orchestra with piano obbligato (1925 Santa Fe - Cleveland)
- Four Episodes for chamber orchestra (1926 San Francisco)
- America, an Epic Rhapsody (1926 San Francisco)
- Helvetia, Symphonic Poem (1929 Frankfurt - San Francisco)
- Evocations, Symphonic Suite (1937 Châtel, Haute Savoie)
- Suite Symphonique (1944 Agate Beach)
- In Memoriam (1952 Agate Beach)
- Concerto Grosso No. 2 for string orchestra (1952 Agate Beach)
- Sinfonia Breve (1953 Agate Beach)
- Symphony in E♭ (1955 Agate Beach)

== Concertante ==
- Schelomo: Rhapsodie Hébraïque for cello solo and large orchestra (1916 Geneva-New York)
- Suite for viola and orchestra (1919 New York)
- Voice in the Wilderness, Symphonic Poem for orchestra with cello obbligato (1936 Châtel, Haute Savoie)
- Concerto for violin and orchestra (1938 Châtel, Haute Savoie)
- Baal Shem for violin and orchestra (1939)
- Concerto Symphonique for piano and orchestra (1948 Agate Beach)
- Scherzo Fantasque for piano and orchestra (1948 Agate Beach)
- Concertino for flute, viola and string orchestra (1948, 1950 Agate Beach)
- Suite Hébraïque, for viola (or violin) and orchestra (1951 Agate Beach)
- Symphony for trombone and orchestra (1954 Agate Beach)
- Proclamation for trumpet and orchestra (1955 Agate Beach)
- Suite Modale for flute and string orchestra (1956 Agate Beach)
- Two Last Poems for flute solo and orchestra (1958 Agate Beach)

== Vocal and choral ==
- Historiettes au Crépuscule for mezzo-soprano and piano (1904 Paris)
- Poèmes d'Automne for mezzo-soprano and orchestra (1906 Geneva)
- Psaume 22 (1913 Satigny)
- Deux Psaumes pour soprano et orchestre, précédés d'un prélude orchestral (1914 Satigny)
- America: An Epic Rhapsody for chorus and orchestra (1926 San Francisco)
- Avodath Hakodesh (Sacred Service) for baritone, orchestra, and chorus (1933 Roveredo-Ticino)

== Chamber ==
=== Piano quintet ===
- Piano Quintet No. 1 (1923 Cleveland)
- Piano Quintet No. 2 (1957)

=== String quartet ===
- String Quartet in G (1896)
- String Quartet No. 1 (1916 Geneva - New York)
- String Quartet No. 2 (1945 Agate Beach)
- String Quartet No. 3 (1952 Agate Beach)
- String Quartet No. 4 (1953 Agate Beach)
- String Quartet No. 5 (1956 Agate Beach)
- In the Mountains (1924 Cleveland)
- Night (1923 Cleveland)
- Paysages (1923 Cleveland); the first movement North was inspired by Robert J. Flaherty's Nanook of the North
- Prelude (1925 Cleveland)
- Two Pieces (1938, 1950 Châtel, Haute Savoie - Agate Beach)

=== Piano trio ===
- Three Nocturnes for piano trio (1924 Cleveland)

== Instrumental ==
=== Violin ===
- Sonata No. 1 for violin and piano (1920 Cleveland)
- Baal Shem (1923 Cleveland)
- Poème Mystique, Sonata No. 2 for violin and piano (1924 Cleveland)
- Nuit Exotique (1924 Cleveland)
- Abodah (1929 San Francisco)
- Mélodie (1929 San Francisco)
- Suite Hébraïque for violin and piano (1951 Agate Beach)
- Suite No. 1 for violin solo (1958 Agate Beach)
- Suite No. 2 for violin solo (1958 Agate Beach)

=== Viola ===
- Suite for viola and piano (1919 New York)
- Suite Hébraïque for viola and piano (1951 Agate Beach)
- Meditation and Processional for viola and piano (1951 Agate Beach)
- Suite for viola solo (unfinished) (1958 Agate Beach)

=== Cello ===
- Cello Sonata (1897)
- Méditation Hébraïque (1924 Cleveland)
- From Jewish Life (1925 Cleveland)
- Suite No. 1 for cello solo (1956 Agate Beach)
- Suite No. 2 for cello solo (1956 Agate Beach)
- Suite No. 3 for cello solo (1957 Agate Beach)

=== Flute ===
- Suite Modale for flute and piano (1956 Agate Beach)

== Piano ==
- Ex-voto (1914 Geneva)
- In the Night: A Love Poem (1922 Cleveland)
- Poems of the Sea (1922 Cleveland)
- Four Circus Pieces (1922 Cleveland)
- Danse Sacrée (1923 Cleveland)
- Enfantines, 10 pieces for children (1923 Cleveland)
- Nirvana, Poem (1923 Cleveland)
- Five Sketches in Sepia (1923 Cleveland)
- Sonata (1935 Châtel, Haute Savoie); written for Guido Agosti
- Visions et Prophéties (1936 Châtel, Haute Savoie)

== Organ ==
- 6 Preludes (1949 Agate Beach)
- 4 Wedding Marches (1950 Agate Beach)
