= Schelomo =

Composition for cello and orchestra by Ernest Bloch

Schelomo: Rhapsodie Hébraïque for Violoncello and Orchestra was the final work of composer Ernest Bloch's Jewish Cycle. Schelomo (the Hebrew form of "Solomon"), which was written in 1915 to 1916, premiered on May 3, 1917, played by cellist Hans Kindler. Artur Bodanzky conducted the concert, which took place in Carnegie Hall. This concert included other works from Bloch's Jewish Cycle, including the premier of Bloch's work the Israel Symphony, which Bloch himself conducted. Three Jewish Tone Poems was also on the concert, but it had premiered two months earlier in Boston.

== Jewish Cycle ==
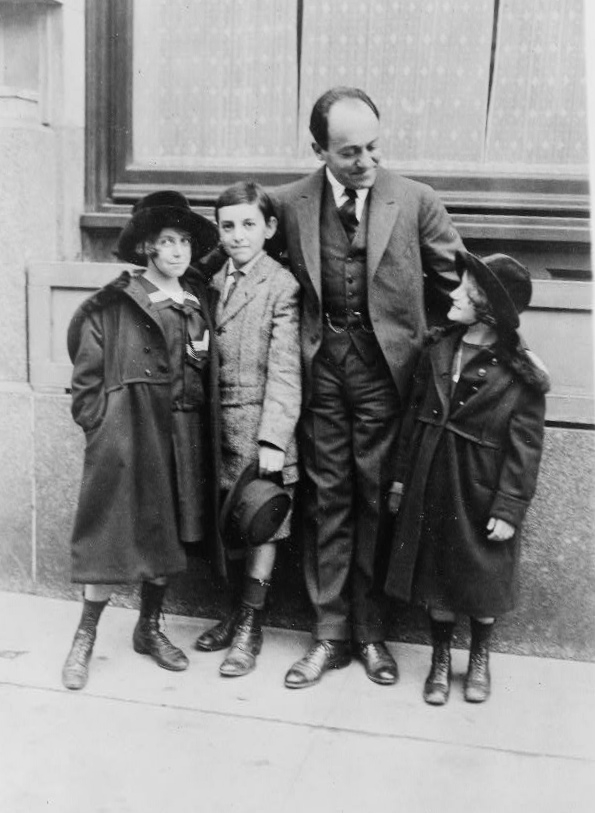
Ernest Bloch with children Suzanne, Ivan and Lucienne

The Cycle refers to a series of compositions by Bloch in which he was trying to find his musical identity. This was Bloch's way of expressing his personal conception and interpretation of what he thought Jewish music should be, since the Jewish national state was yet to be formed, in the strictest sense, at the time these biblically inspired works were written. These works include: Three Jewish Tone Poems (1913); Prelude and Psalms 114 and 137 for soprano and orchestra (1912–1914); Psalm 22 for baritone and orchestra (1914); Israel: Symphony with voices (1912–1916); and Schelomo: Rhapsodie Hébraïque for Violoncello and Orchestra (1916).

== Background ==
Schelomo was the final work completed by Bloch before coming to America in 1916. Initially conceived as a vocal work set the text from the Book of Ecclesiastes, the composer ran into trouble deciding what language to use. A serendipitous meeting occurred between Bloch and cellist Alexandre Barjansky, who impressed Bloch with his mastery of the instrument, which had the brooding vocal quality that he envisioned for Schelomo. The word Schelomo, being the Hebrew form of Solomon, uses the violoncello to represent the voice of King Solomon. While Bloch did search for inspiration from the Bible for this composition, it was instead a wax statuette of King Solomon, created by Katherina Barjansky, wife of Bloch's friend the cellist Alexandre Barjansky, to whom the work was dedicated.

== Analysis ==
Bloch recounts about the work in 1932, which he describes as ”psychoanalysis” of his unconscious creative process, stating that the solo cello in Schelomo is the incarnation of King Solomon and that the orchestra represents the world around him, as well as his experiences in life. He also says that sometimes the orchestra reflects the thoughts of Solomon while the solo cello expresses his words.

Schelomo is divided into three sections, with each section separated by the use of different textures and themes in cyclic form. Schelomo is scored for three flutes, two oboes, English horn, two clarinets in Bb, bass clarinet, two bassoons, contrabassoon, four horns in F, three trumpets in C, three trombones, tuba, timpani, tambourine, snare-drum, bass-drum, cymbals, tam-tam, celesta, two harps, violins (at least twelve players), violas (at least ten), cellos (at least six), basses (at least four).

=== First section ===
In the first section, the texture in the orchestra is transparent. Both orchestra and cello soloist introduce and develop the main thematic material heard throughout the composition. There are six essential thematic ideas introduced in this section. The work begins with a lament for the solo cello as the voice of King Solomon, inspired by the text, "Nothing is worth the pain it causes." "All this is vanity." The next theme, which transforms the free-flowing, cadential lament into a rhythmic dance motif, is introduced for the first time by the solo cello. This motif will appear throughout the work, in both the solo cello and orchestra, highlighting the interplay of narrative roles. After these two themes of the introduction conclude, the first occurrence of the cadenza appears in the solo cello. The cadenza is used to interrupt the piece three times, representing Solomon's rejection of the vanity the world provides. Bloch describes this section as the wives and concubines of Solomon trying to tear him away from his thoughts. At rehearsal number 2, the solo cello begins variations on the dance theme. This section grandly builds to a climax after a series of Oriental motifs, finally ending with another statement of the cadenza, a depiction of Solomon's revulsion, before the next section begins.

=== Second section ===
The second section introduces the shofar-like theme and texture for the first time in the piece, which is played by the celesta. The theme is then passed to the bassoon. Once this new theme is introduced, the solo cello immediately returns to the motif of the cadenza. This iteration of the cadenza highlights the conflict between the soloist and the orchestra. Put in counterpoint with the new theme, the solo cello is fighting the direction the orchestra is taking. The aggressive presentation of the orchestra forces the solo cello to join in, claiming the theme at an even faster tempo. This section continues to build and accelerate until the largest climax of the piece occurs. This is the point in which Solomon declares, "Vanity of vanities, all is vanity! Nothing!" The turmoil of the orchestra subsides and fades away into the distance.

=== Final section ===
The final section of Schelomo is marked andante moderato and does not introduce any new thematic material, instead, texture changes and the main themes from the previous section are developed considerably until the end. While heavily orchestrated, the theme in the solo cello remains unaffected by the surrounding influences, setting it apart from previous statements earlier in the work. In addition, the introduction of major seconds in the main theme, which was previously highly chromatic, relieves tension. The final measures of the piece restate the theme from the cadenza as a discouraged epilogue. This final attempt of the cadential motif illustrates Solomon's final collapse into silence.

== Reception ==
In 1921, Italian critic Guido M. Gatti wrote of Schelomo that Bloch had "reached the perfection of his music... The violoncello with its ample breadth of phrasing, now melodic and with moments of superb lyricism, now declamatory and with robustly dramatic lights and shades, lends itself to a reincarnation of Solomon and all his glory... The orchestra palpitates in all colors of the rainbow; from the vigorous and transparent orchestration there emerge waves of sound that seem to soar upward in stupendous vortices and fall back in a shower of myriads of iridescent drops."
