= Albert Elkus =

American composer, pianist, and educator (1884–1962)

Albert Israel Elkus (April 30, 1884 – February 19, 1962) was an American composer, pianist, and educator.

== Biography ==
Elkus came from a family with a background in music and commerce and received early music training from his mother, Bertha Kahn Elkus. His father, also Albert Elkus, was a business owner and Mayor of Sacramento. He then went on to study with Hugo Mansfeld in Sacramento and San Francisco. He attended the University of California, Berkeley, earning the BLitt and MLitt in 1906 and 1907. While attending the university he gave many public piano recitals throughout the Bay area and northern California, most notably with the Saturday Club of Sacramento.

After completing academic studies at UC Berkeley, he went to Berlin to study music theory and composition with Hugo Kaun. He then returned to the Bay area and continued his studies with Oscar Weil. From 1912 to 1914 he went abroad again; in Paris he studied piano with Harold Bauer, in Berlin, he studied piano and composition with Josef Lhévinne and Georg Schumann, and in Vienna he studied composition with Carl Prohaska and conducting with Franz Schalk.

== Professional career ==
On returning to the United States in 1915, Elkus taught at the Jenkins School of Music in Oakland. From 1916 to 1928 he conducted several choral societies in San Francisco and Sacramento. He was the head of the Theory Department at the San Francisco Conservatory of Music from 1923 to 1925, then again from 1930 to 1937, and finally returned there as the director from 1951 to 1957. He also taught at Dominican College and Mills College.

Elkus had an extensive association with the music department at UC Berkeley, lasting from 1931 to 1959. He became the conductor of the University Symphony Orchestra in 1934. He was chairman there from 1937 to 1951 and brought in distinguished musicians such as Randall Thompson, Ernest Bloch, Roger Sessions, Arthur Bliss, Manfred Bukofzer, and the Griller Quartet.

In 1959 UC Berkeley conferred on Elkus the honorary degree Doctor of Laws. He continued to teach at the conservatory and give lectures at the university until his death.

In honor of Elkus, UC Berkeley annually bestows the Albert Elkus Award to four or five outstanding students from the class that Elkus taught most often, Music 27: Introduction to Music (for non-music majors).

== Works ==
Elkus was prolific as a composer, writing in a post-Brahmsian style, tending towards conservatism but with an emphasis on chromatic harmonics tinged with a dash of Impressionism. He revered Beethoven and remained firmly entrenched in the music of the Romantics. He also had a great love of the music of the Baroque and Renaissance eras, and took a vigorous part in furthering the music of his own time.

His 1917 piece Impression from a Greek Tragedy won the Juilliard Award in 1935 and found its way into many orchestra repertoires. He virtually stopped composing once he became chair of the UC Berkeley music department.

He was performed by symphonies around the world, including San Francisco, Los Angeles, New York, Paris, and London.

Elkus was one of the editors of Oscar Weil Letters and Papers (1923), with Flora Arnstein and Stewart Young.
