= Obbligato =

Term in Western classical music

In Western classical music, obbligato (Italian pronunciation: [obbliˈɡaːto], also spelled obligato, plural obbligati or obligati) usually describes a musical line that is in some way indispensable in performance. Its opposite is the marking ad libitum. It can also be used, more specifically, to indicate that a passage of music was to be played exactly as written, or only by the specified instrument, without changes or omissions. The word is borrowed from Italian (an adjective meaning mandatory; from Latin obligatus p.p. of obligare, to oblige); the spelling obligato is not acceptable in British English, but it is often used as an alternative spelling in the US. The word can stand on its own, in English, as a noun, or appear as a modifier in a noun phrase (e.g. organ obbligato).

The term has also come to refer to a countermelody.

== Independence ==
Obbligato includes the idea of independence, as in C. P. E. Bach's 1780 Symphonies mit zwölf obligaten Stimmen (with twelve obbligato parts) by which Bach was referring to the independent woodwind parts he was using for the first time. These parts were also obbligato in the sense of being indispensable.

== Continuo ==
In connection with a keyboard part in the baroque period, obbligato has a very specific meaning: it describes a functional change from a basso continuo part (in which the player decided how to fill in the harmonies unobtrusively) to a fully written part of equal importance to the main melody part.

== Contradictory usage ==
A later use has the contradictory meaning of optional, indicating that a part was not obligatory. A difficult passage in a concerto might be furnished by the editor with an easier alternative called the obbligato (but more commonly and correctly termed an ossia); or a work may have a part for one or more solo instruments, marked obbligato, that is decorative rather than essential; the piece is complete and can be performed without the added part. The traditional term for such a part is ad libitum, or ad lib., or simply optional, since ad lib. may have a wide variety of interpretations.

== Contemporary usage ==
In classical music the term has fallen out of use by modern-day practitioners, as composers, performers and audiences alike have come to see the musical text as paramount in decisions of musical execution. As a result, everything is now seen as obbligato unless explicitly specified otherwise in the score. It is still used to denote an orchestral piece with an instrumental solo part that stands out, but is not as prominent as in a solo concerto, as in Bloch's Concerto Grosso mentioned below. The term is now used mainly to discuss music of the past. One contemporary usage, however, is that by Erik Satie in the conclusion of the final movement, "III de Podophthalma," of Embryons desséchés (Desiccated Embryos), where an obbligato—styled Cadence obligée (de l'Auteur)—consists of (depending upon how one counts) thirty F-major chords played fortissimo, satirising Beethoven's symphonic style.

== Examples ==
=== Explicit instances ===
- J. S. Bach used organ obbligato to show at a glance the importance of the organ part (in for example cantata Wer sich selbst erhöhet, der soll erniedriget werden, BWV 47 and cantata Gott ist mein König, BWV 71).
- Mozart marks "cello obligato" in Don Giovanni in Zerlina's aria "Batti, batti, o bel Masetto".
- Beethoven's duo for viola and cello, WoO 32, is subtitled mit zwei obligaten Augengläsern (with two [pairs of] obbligato eyeglasses) which seems to refer to the necessity, at the first performance, of spectacles for both Beethoven and his cellist.
- Niels Gade's Fifth Symphony (1852) contains an obbligato piano part.
- Camille Saint-Saëns's famous symphonic poem Danse Macabre features an obbligato violin.
- Heinrich Schütz's "Benedicam Dominum in omni tempore" in Symphoniae sacrae I, 1629 for soprano, tenor, bass and continuo with obbligato cornetto, o violino.
- John Philip Sousa's march "The Stars and Stripes Forever" contains a piccolo obbligato in one of the trios and the grandioso.
- Ernest Bloch's 1925 Concerto Grosso No. 1 for string orchestra with piano obbligato is a neoclassical composition with 20th-century modal harmonies.
- John Cage's Solo with Obbligato Accompaniment of Two Voices in Canon, and Six Short Inventions on the Subject of the Solo (1934, 1958)
- Malcolm Arnold's A Grand, Grand Overture, Op. 57 (1956) is a 20th-century parody of the late 19th century concert overture, and contains obbligato parts for four rifles, three Hoover vacuum cleaners (two uprights in B♭, one horizontal with detachable sucker in C), and an electric floor polisher in E♭
- Benjamin Britten's 1958 Nocturne for tenor, 7 obligato instruments & strings in which the tenor soloist is accompanied by one or more obbligato instruments in each of the eight movements (apart from the first)
- Hector Berlioz's Harold en Italie contains an extensive part for viola obbligato

=== Implicit instances ===
- Trumpet obbligato in J. S. Bach's cantata Jauchzet Gott in allen Landen, BWV 51
- Horn obbligato in Mozart's opera Mitridate, re di Ponto
- Flute, oboe, violin, and cello obbligati in Mozart's opera Die Entführung aus dem Serail
- Clarinet, basset clarinet, and basset horn obbligati in Mozart's opera La clemenza di Tito
- Piano obbligato in Mozart's aria "Ch'io mi scordi di te? ... Non temer, amato bene"
- Piano obbligato in Rued Langgaard's Third Symphony
- Horn obbligato in Beethoven's opera Fidelio
- Bassoon obbligato in Verdi's setting of the Requiem
- Violin obbligato in Beethoven's mass Missa solemnis
- Horn obbligato in Gustav Mahler's Symphony No. 5
- Flute obbligato in Donizetti's opera Lucia di Lammermoor
- Bass clarinet obbligato in Morton Gould's Latin American Symphonette
- Clarinet obbligato in Porter Steele's "High Society"
- Piano obbligato in Frederik Magle's symphonic suite Cantabile
