= Shofar =

Wind instrument made from an animal horn used in Judaism

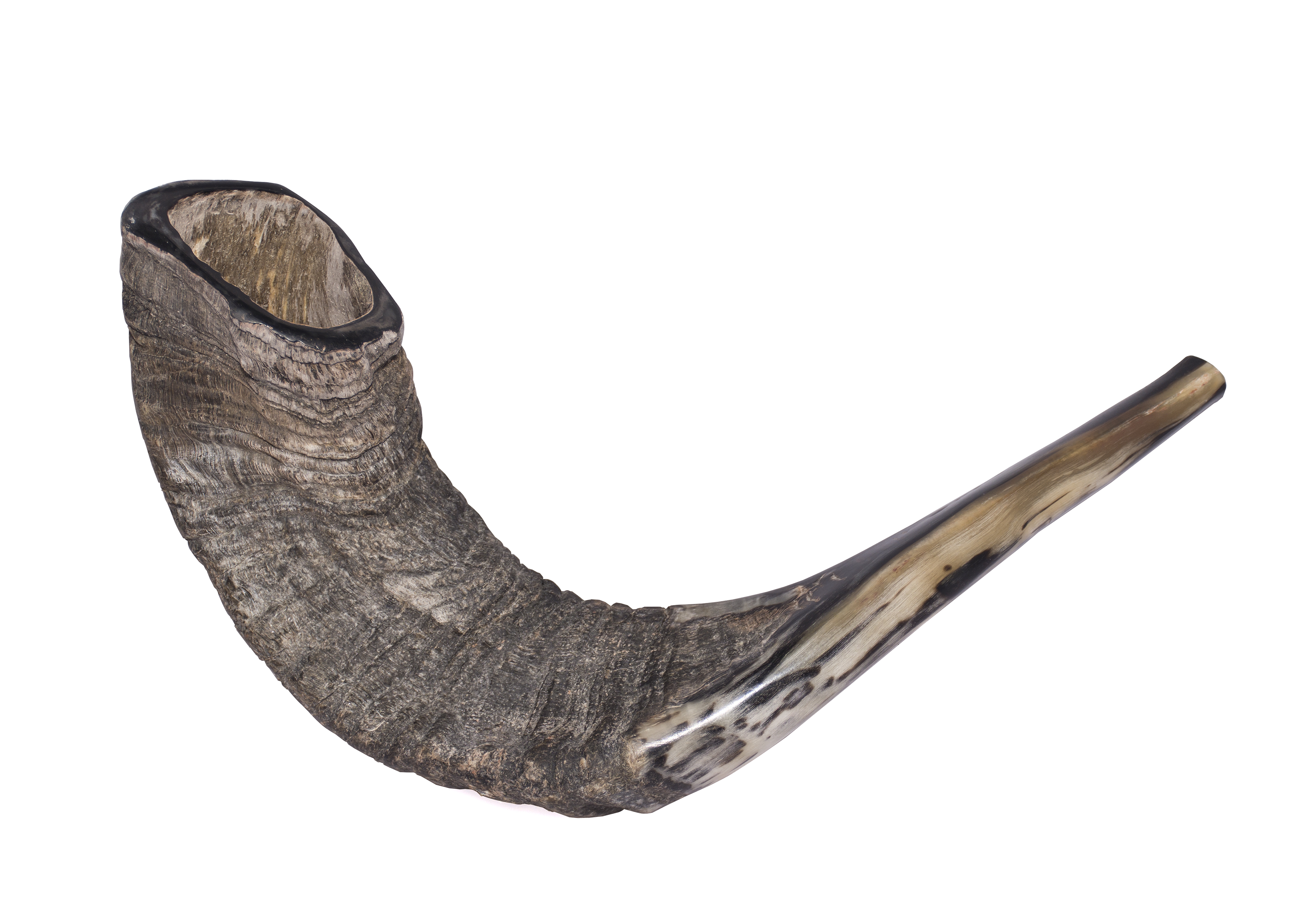
Shofar

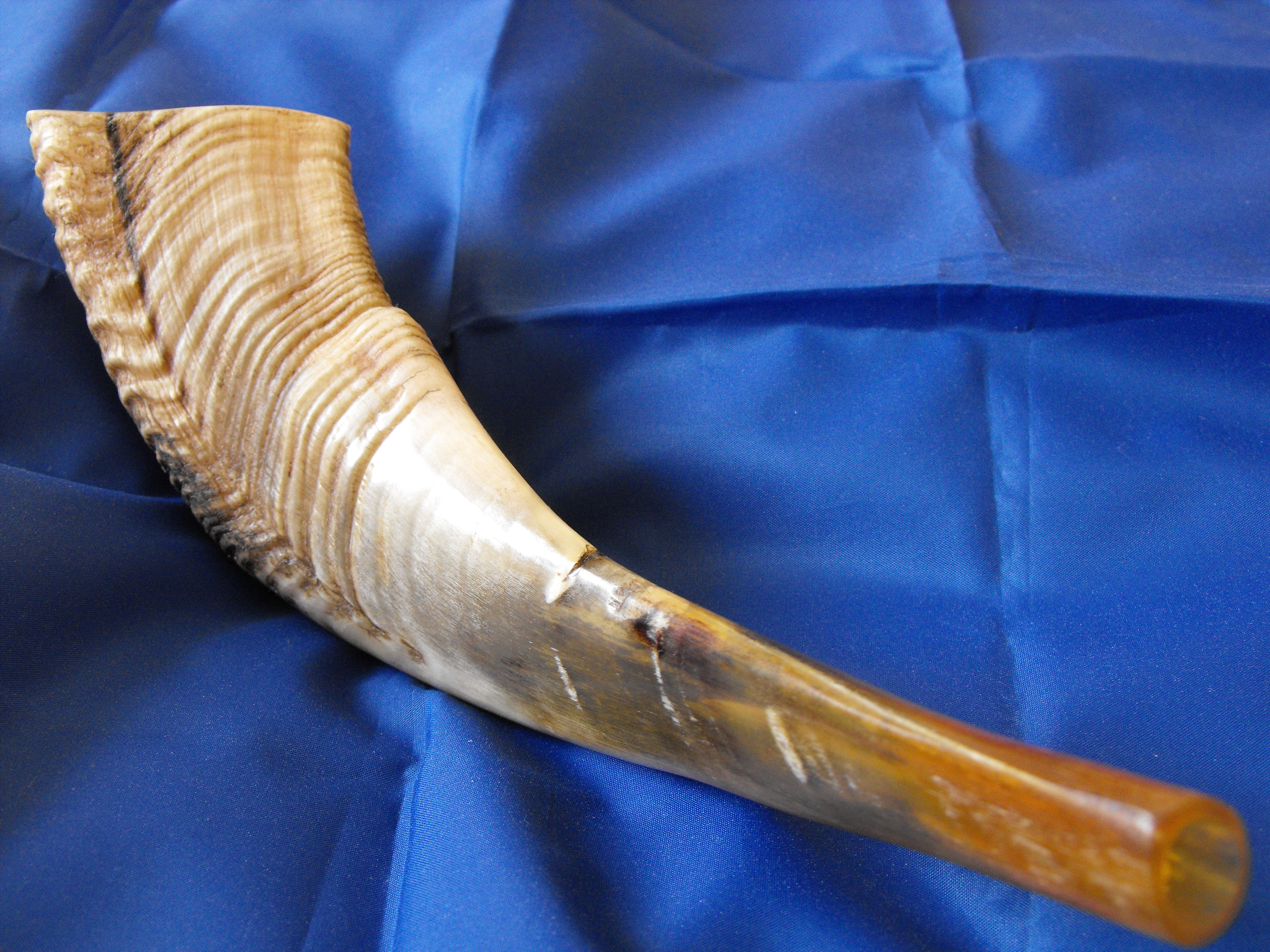
Shofar

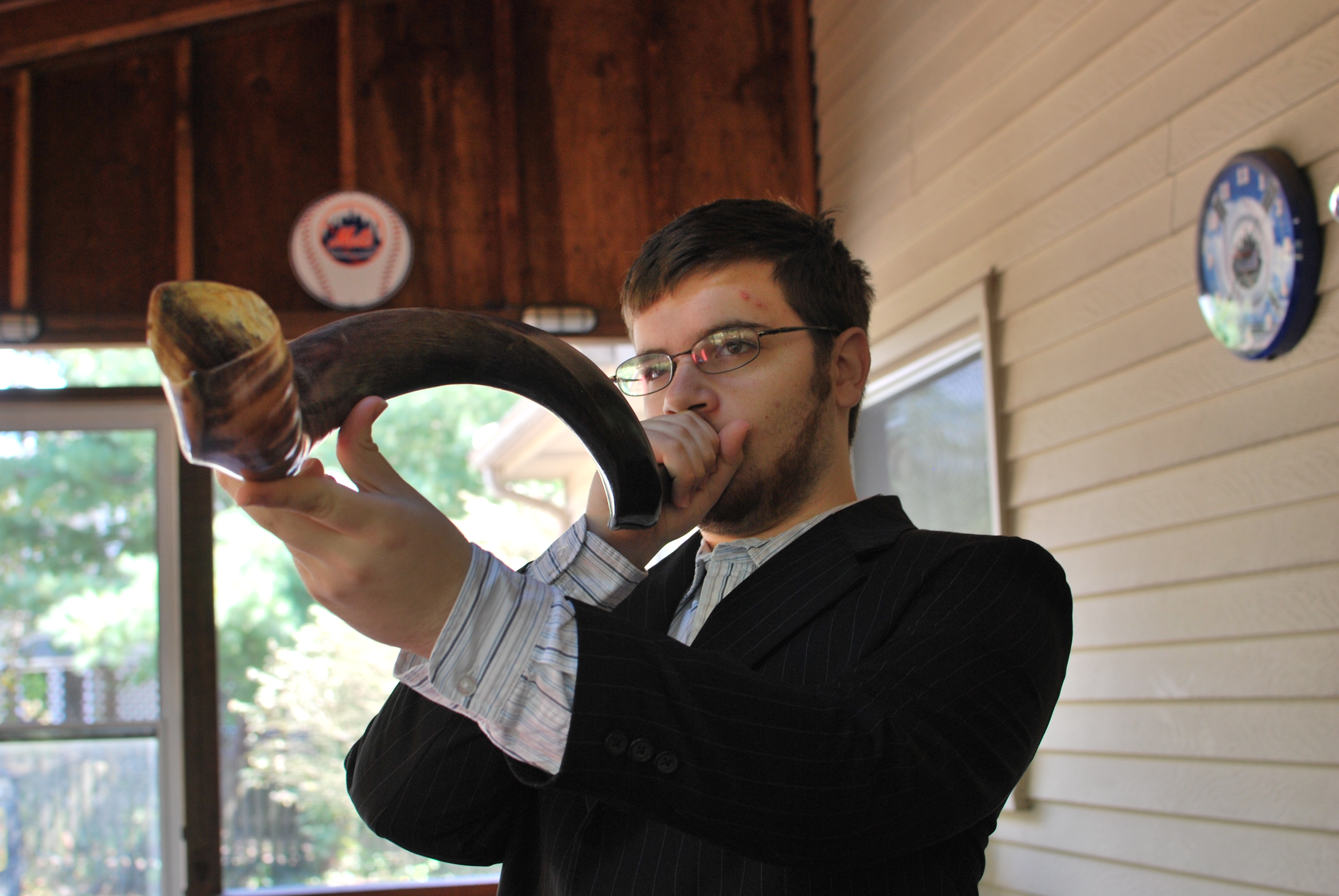
Blowing the shofar

A shofar (/ʃoʊˈfɑːr/ shoh-FAR; from שׁוֹפָר, pronounced [ʃoˈfar]) is an ancient musical horn, typically a ram's horn, used for Jewish ritual purposes. Like the modern bugle, the shofar lacks pitch-altering devices, with all pitch control done by the player's varying their embouchure. The shofar is blown in synagogue services on Rosh Hashanah and at the end of Yom Kippur; it is also blown every weekday morning in the month of Elul running up to Rosh Hashanah. Shofars come in a variety of sizes and shapes, depending on the choice of animal and level of finish.

== Bible and rabbinic literature ==
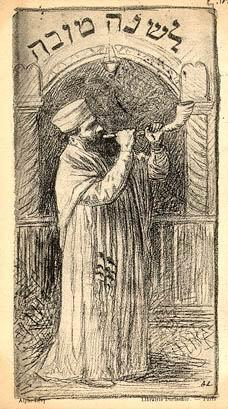
Shofar (by Alphonse Lévy). The caption says: "To a good year".

The shofar is mentioned frequently in the Hebrew Bible, the Talmud and rabbinic literature. In the first instance, in Exodus 19, the blast of a shofar emanating from the thick cloud on Mount Sinai makes the Israelites tremble in awe.

The shofar was used to announce the new moon and the Jubilee year. The first day of Tishrei (now known as Rosh Hashana) is termed a "memorial of blowing", or "day of blowing", the shofar. Shofars were used for signifying the start of a war. They were also employed in processions as musical accompaniment, and were inserted into the temple orchestra by David. Note that the "trumpets" described in Numbers 10 are a different instrument, described by the Hebrew word for 'trumpet' (Hebrew: חצוצרה, romanized: ḥaṣoṣrah), not shofar (Hebrew: שופר).

In the Temple in Jerusalem, the shofar was sometimes used together with the trumpet. On Rosh Hashana, the principal ceremony was conducted with the shofar, with the instrument placed in the center with a trumpet on either side; it was the horn of an ibex (a type of wild goat) and straight in shape, being ornamented with gold at the mouthpiece. On fast days, the principal ceremony was conducted with the trumpets in the center and with a shofar on either side. On those occasions, the shofarot were rams' horns curved in shape and ornamented with silver at the mouthpieces.

On Yom Kippur of the jubilee year, the ceremony was performed with the shofar as on New Year's Day. Shofar first indicated in Yovel (Jubilee Year—Lev. 25:8–13). Indeed, in Rosh Hashanah 33b, the sages ask why the Shofar sounded in Jubilee year. Rosh Hashanah 29a indicates that in ordinary years both Shofars and trumpets are sounded but in the Jubilee Year only the Shofar blasts. The Rabbis created the practice of the Shofar's sounding every Yom Kippur rather than just on the Jubilee Year (once in 50 years).

Otherwise, for all other special days, the Shofar is sounded shorter and two special silver trumpets announced the sacrifice. When the trumpets sound the signal, all the people who were within the Temple complex prostrate themselves, stretching out flat, face down, and on the ground.

The shofar was blown in the times of Joshua to help him capture Jericho. As they surrounded the walls, the shofar was blown and the Jews were able to capture the city. The shofar was commonly taken out to war so the troops would know when a battle would begin. The person who would blow the shofar would call out to the troops from atop a hill. All of the troops were able to hear the call of the shofar from their position because of its distinct sound.

=== Post-Biblical times ===
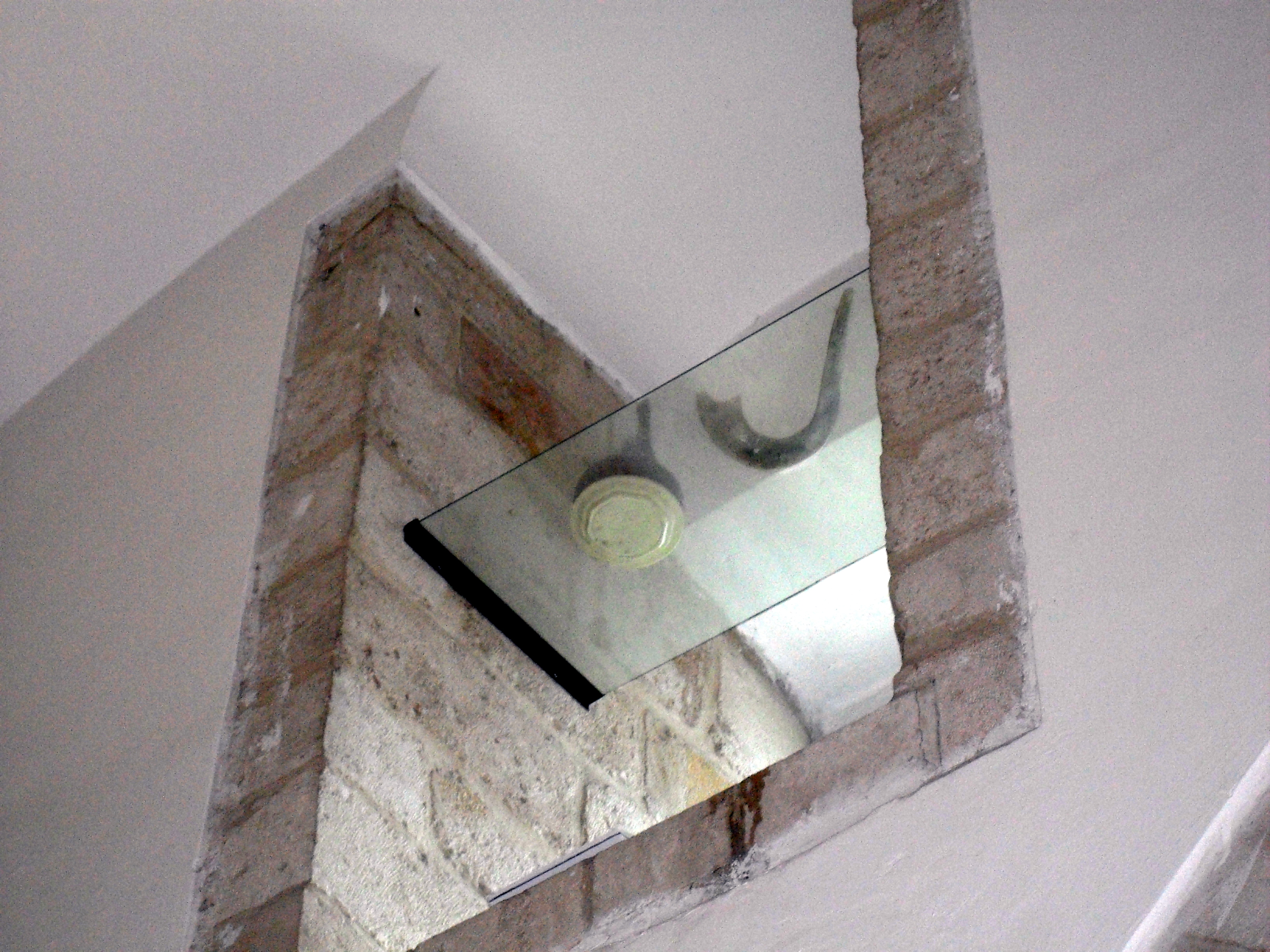
At Old Jerusalem's Rabban Yochanan ben Zakai Synagogue, a flask of oil and a shofar await the Mashiach.

While the shofar is best known nowadays for its use on Rosh Hashana, it also has a number of other ritual uses. It is blown each morning (and in some communities in the afternoon as well) during the month of Elul, and to mark the end of the day of fasting on Yom Kippur, once the services have been completed in the evening.

In Talmudic times the shofar was also blown to introduce Shabbat. It was also used both to initiate and dissolve a Herem.

At the inception of the diaspora, during the short-lived ban on playing musical instruments, the shofar was enhanced in its use, as a sign of mourning for the destruction of the temple. The declaration of the ban's source was in fact set to the music itself as the lamentation "Al Naharoth Bavel" within a few centuries of the ban. (A full orchestra played in the temple. The ban was so that this would not be taken for granted, hence the wording of the ban, "if I forget thee, O Jerusalem, over my chiefest joy...".) The shofar is generally no longer used for secular purposes (see a notable exception in a section further down).

Halakha (Jewish law) rules that the Rosh Hashana shofar blasts may not be sounded on Shabbat, due to the potential that the ba'al tekiah (shofar sounder) may inadvertently carry it, which is in a class of forbidden Shabbat work. Some explain this prohibition as stemming from the spiritual effects of the shofar which are matched by the spiritual energy of Shabbat, making Shofar blowing unnecessary. Originally, the shofar was sounded on Shabbat in the Temple in Jerusalem. After the temple's destruction, the sounding of the shofar on Shabbat was restricted to the place where the great Sanhedrin was located. However, when the Sanhedrin ceased to exist, the sounding of the shofar on Shabbat was discontinued.

=== Mitzvah ===
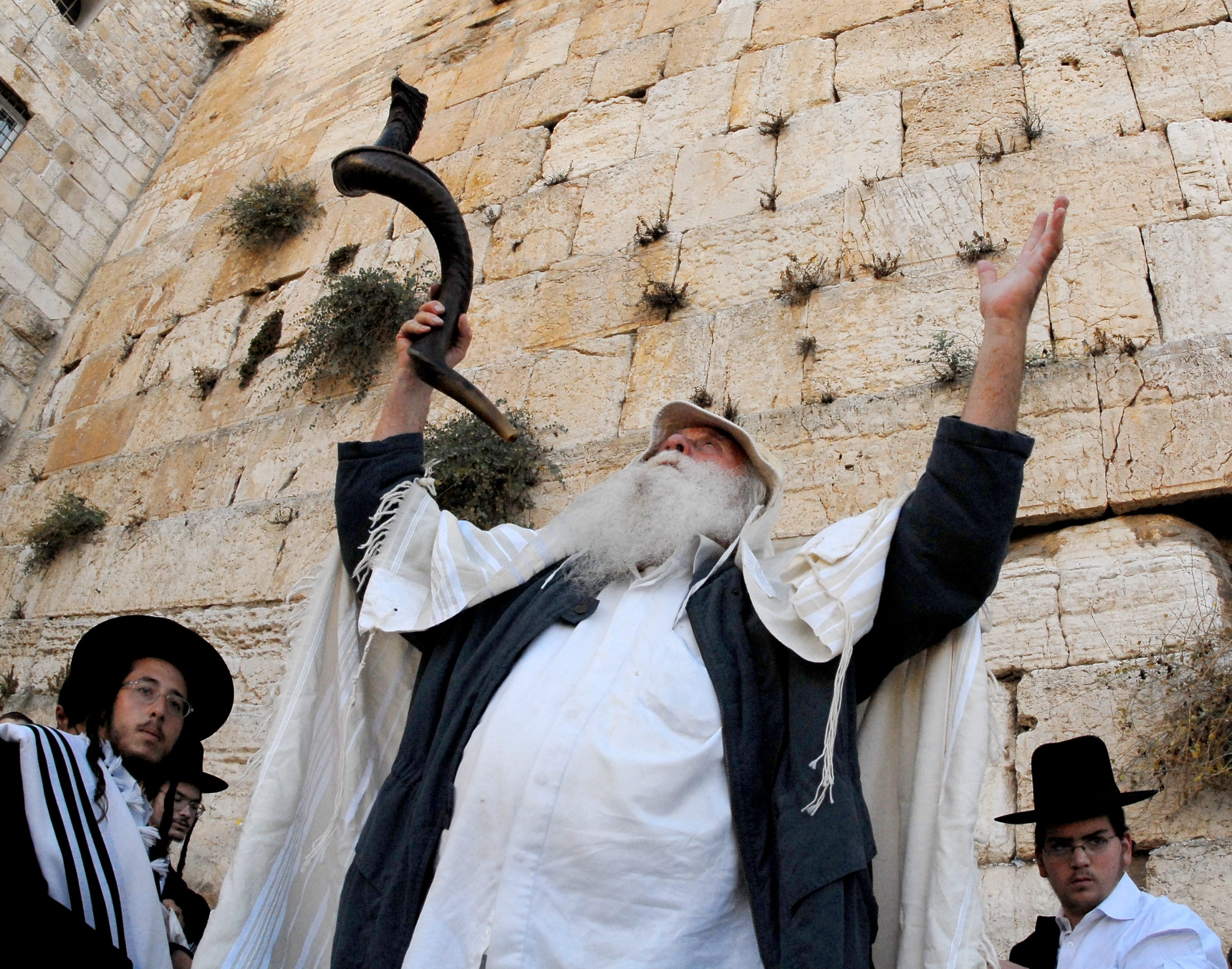
Jewish "Slichot" prayer service with shofar during the Days of Repentance preceding Yom Kippur at the Western Wall in Jerusalem's Old City, 2008

The Sages indicated that the mitzvah was to hear the sounds of the shofar. The sages received the tradition to derive from the three times the blowing of the Shofar is mentioned in the Torah in association with the high holidays, that the Shofar must be sounded three times. Customarily, each complex sound would be preceded and succeeded by a simple, straight sound, totalling nine sounds. Due to confusion whether the main complex sound was a series of three shortened sounds, nine staccato blasts, or possibly a combination of both, all three were formed into independent series of 9, 9, and 12 sounds respectively. This is the main obligation of Shofar on Rosh Hashanah.

There are many reasons cited for this Mitzvah. The most famous list was compiled by the medieval sage Saadia Gaon, cited in Abudraham.

1. To remind us of the creation of the world
2. to remind us of the beginning of the new year
3. to remind us of the Mt. Sinai experience
4. to remind us of the inspiring words of the prophets
5. to remind us of the destruction of the Holy Temple
6. to remind us of the Binding of Isaac.
7. to arouse in us fear and awe of G‑d Al-mighty
8. to arouse in us fear and awe for the Day of Judgment
9. to arouse our belief in the future ingathering of the exiles and ultimate redemption of Mashiach, and inspire our yearning for it
10. to arouse our belief in the future Resurrection of the Dead.

If a shofar was blown into a pit or cave, one fulfilled the mitzvah if they heard the original sound, but not if they heard the echo. Thus, most modern halakhic authorities hold that hearing a shofar on the radio or the Internet would not be valid to satisfy the mitzvah because "electronically reproduced sounds do not suffice for mitzvot that require hearing a specific natural sound.... However, one should consult a competent rabbi if an unusually pressing situation arises, as some authorities believe that performing mitzvot through electronically reproduced sound is preferable to not performing them at all."

According to Jewish law women and minors are exempt from the commandment of hearing the shofar blown (as is the case with any positive, time-bound commandment), but they are encouraged to attend the ceremony.

If the ba'al tekiah (shofar sounder) blows with the intention that all who hear will perform the mitzvah, then anyone listening—even someone passing by—who intends to hear the Shofar can perform the mitzvah because the community blower blows for everybody. If the listener stands still, it is presumed he intends to hear. If one hears the blast but with no intention of fulfilling the mitzvah, then the mitzvah has not been fulfilled.

=== Qualifications ===
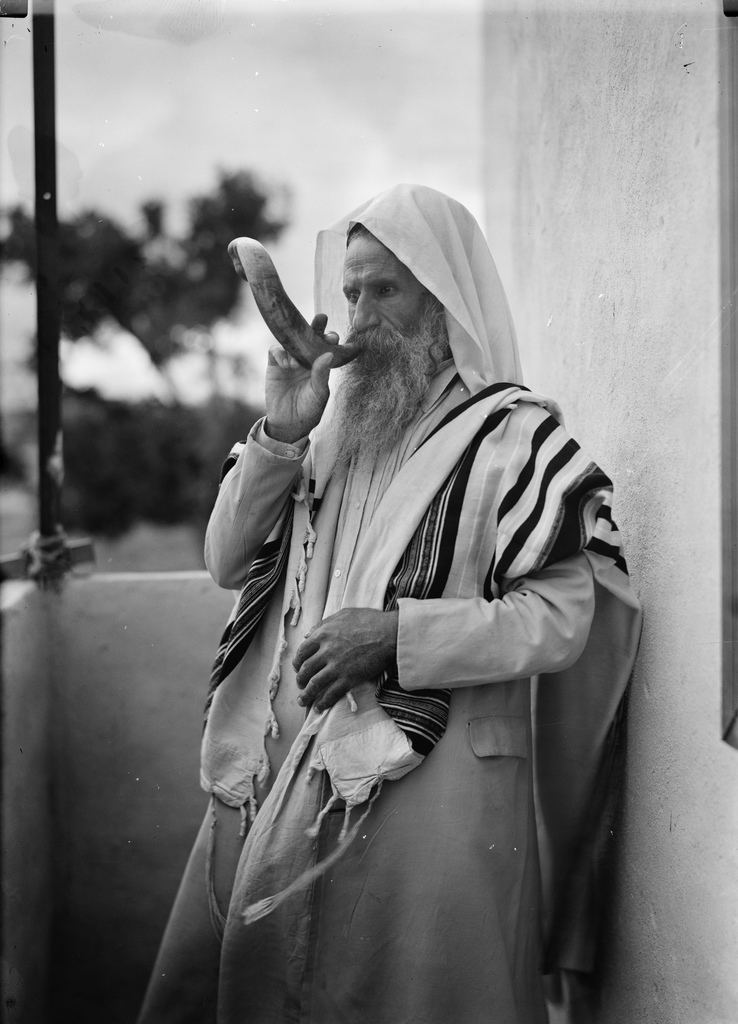
Yemenite Jew blowing the shofar, late 1930s

The expert who blows (or "blasts" or "sounds") the shofar is termed the ba'al tokeah or ba'al tekiah (lit. "master of the blast"). Being a ba'al tekiah is an honor. Every male Jew is eligible for this sacred office, providing he is acceptable to the congregation. The one who blows the shofar on Rosh Hashanah should be learned in the Torah and shall be God-fearing.

The Shulchan Aruch discusses who is fit to blow the shofar on behalf of a congregation:

- Anyone not obligated to fulfill the mitzvah of sounding the shofar cannot fulfill the commandment for (cover) another whose duty it is to perform the mitzvah.
- Although a woman (who is exempt from this mitzvah because it is time-bound) may not blow the shofar for men (whose duty it is to perform the mitzvah), a woman may intone the shofar for herself and other women. The Halakhic authorities debate whether a woman may recite a blessing on commandments that they are not commanded to perform; generally, Ashkenazic women recite a blessing and Sephardic women do not.
- Only a freeman (not even a slave who will become free in the next month) can be a Ba'al Tekiah.

== Shape and material ==
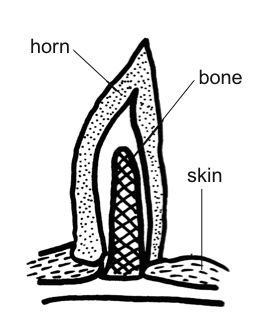
Cross section of an animal's horn. To make a shofar, the bone (crosshatches) and fleshy sheath (white) are removed, leaving the actual horn.

=== Choice of animal ===
According to the Talmud, a shofar may be made from the horn of any animal from the Bovidae family except that of a cow, although a ram is preferable. Bovidae horns are made of a layer of keratin (the same material as human toenails and fingernails) around a core of bone, with a layer of cartilage in between, which can be removed to leave the hollow keratin horn. An antler, on the other hand, is made of solid bone, so an antler cannot be used as a shofar because it cannot be hollowed out.

There is no requirement for ritual slaughter (shechita). Theoretically, the horn can come from a non-kosher animal, because under most (but not all) interpretations of Jewish law, the shofar is not required to be muttar be-fikha ('permissible in your mouth'); the mitzvah is hearing the shofar, not eating the animal it came from. The shofar falls into the category of tashmishei mitzvah – objects used to perform a mitzvah that do not themselves have inherent holiness. Moreover, because horn is always inedible, it is considered afra be-alma ('mere dust') and not a non-kosher substance.

The Elef Hamagen (586:5) delineates the order of preference: 1) curved ram; 2) curved other sheep; 3) curved other animal; 4) straight—ram or otherwise; 5) non-kosher animal; 6) cow. The first four categories are used with a bracha (blessing), the fifth without a bracha, and the last, not at all.

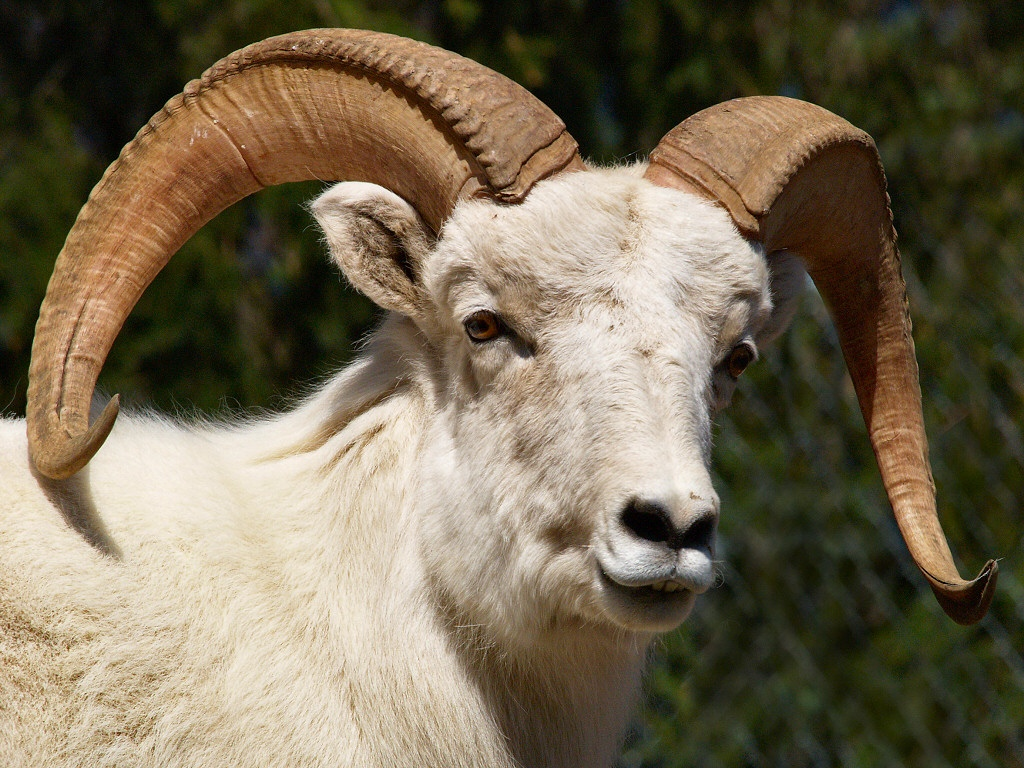
A Dall sheep with horns.

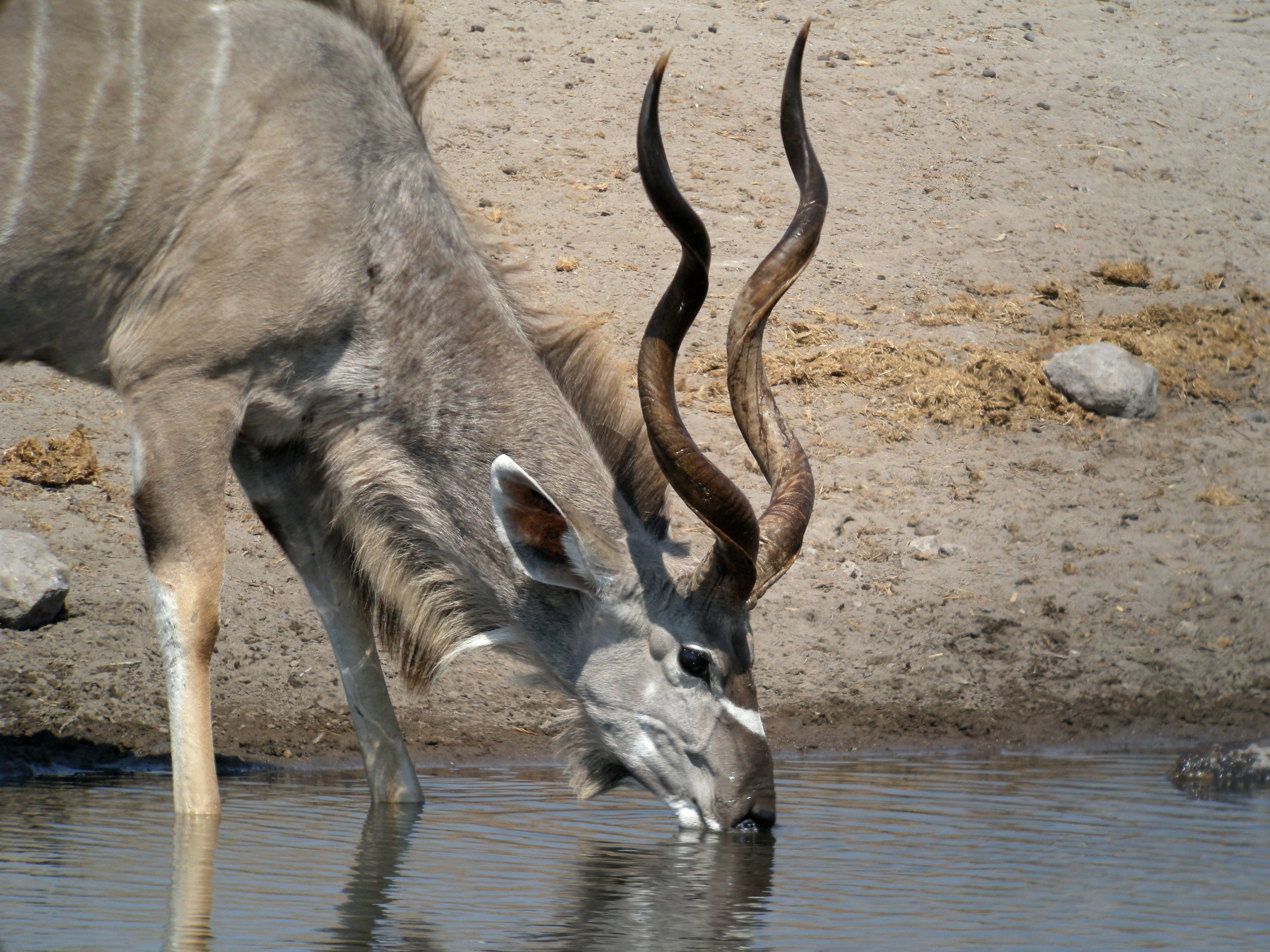
Greater kudu, Namibia.

=== Construction ===
In practice, two species are generally used: the Ashkenazi and Sefardi shofar is made from the horn of a domestic ram, while a Yemeni shofar is made from the horn of a kudu. A Moroccan shofar is flat, with a single, broad curve. A crack or hole in the shofar affecting the sound renders it unfit for ceremonial use. A shofar may not be painted in colors, but it may be carved with artistic designs. Shofars (especially the Sephardi shofars) are sometimes plated with silver across part of their length for artistic display purposes, although this invalidates them for use in religious ritual practices.

The horn is flattened and shaped by the application of heat, which softens it. A hole is made from the tip of the horn to the natural hollow inside. It is played much like a European brass instrument, with the player blowing through the hole while buzzing the lips, causing the air column inside to vibrate. Sephardi shofars do usually have a carved mouthpiece resembling that of a European trumpet or French horn, but smaller. Ashkenazi shofars do not.

Because the hollow of the shofar is irregular in shape, the harmonics obtained when playing the instrument can vary: rather than a pure perfect fifth, intervals as narrow as a fourth, or as wide as a sixth may be produced.

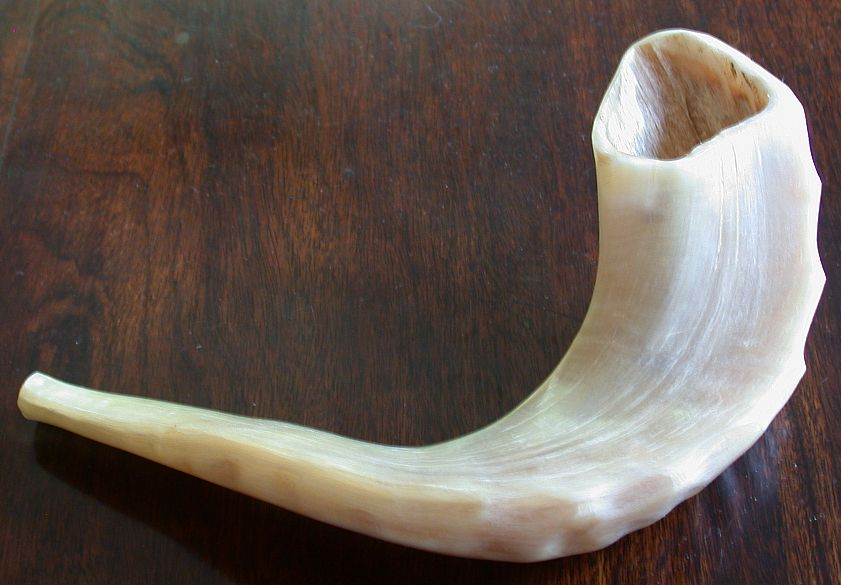
A small shofar made from a ram's horn.

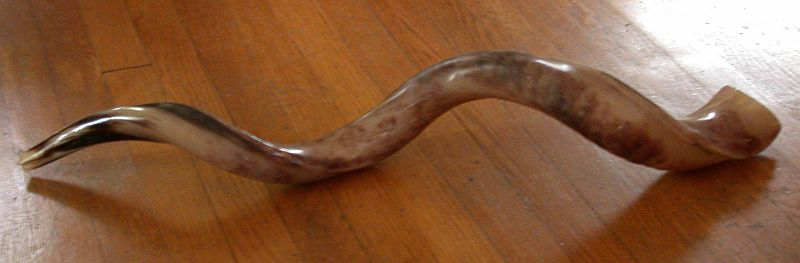
A shofar made from the horn of a greater kudu.

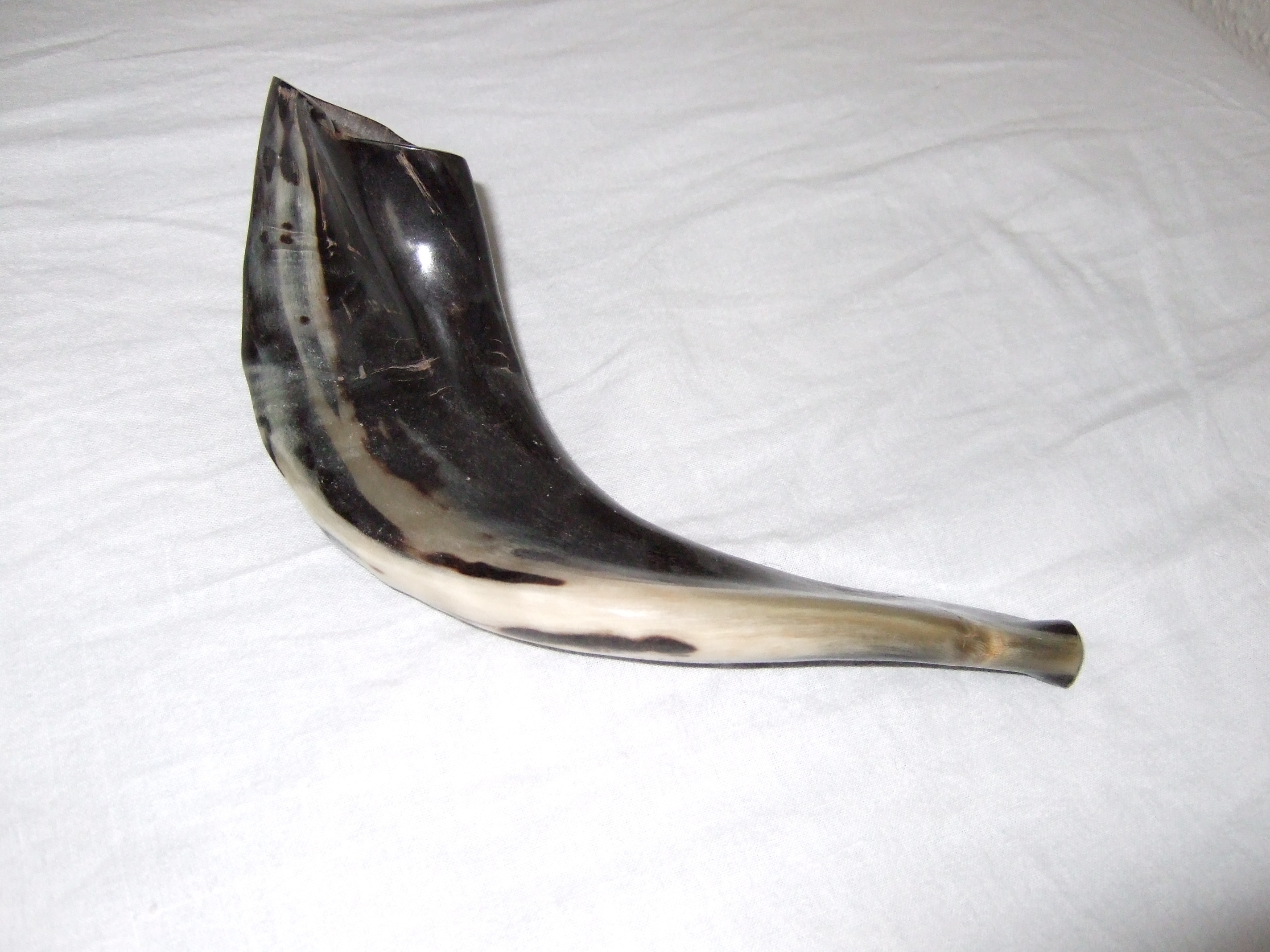
A small shofar made from a ram's horn.

== Use in modern Jewish prayer ==
The shofar is used mainly on Rosh Hashanah. It is customary to blow the shofar 100 or 101 times on each day of Rosh Hashanah; however, as mentioned, the main obligation is 30 sounds. The remaining seventy consist of 60 during the Mussaf prayer broken down into ten after each of three main themes of the Rosh Hashanah services; crowning God as king, beseeching God to remember us, and bringing up the theme of Shofar blasts from different places in the Bible, and repeated during the repetition of the Mussaf prayer. The last 10 are added after the Mussaf prayer, totalling 100 blasts. The various types of blast are known as tekiah, shevarim, and teruah. The 30 required blasts consist of the sequences tekiah-shevarim-teruah-tekiah, tekiah-shevarim-tekiah, tekiah-teruah-tekiah, each sequence repeated three times.

The shofar is also blown in synagogue at the conclusion of Yom Kippur. Some only blow a tekiah gedolah; others blow tekiah-shevarim-teruah-tekiah.

Because of its inherent ties to the Days of Repentance and the inspiration that comes along with hearing its piercing blasts, the shofar is also blown after weekday morning services (in some communities, also at weekday afternoon services) for the entire month of Elul, the last month of the Jewish civil year, preceding Rosh Hashana. It is not blown on the last day of Elul (in some communities, the last 3 days of Elul), however, to mark the difference between the voluntary blasts of the month and the mandatory blasts of Rosh Hashana. Shofar blasts are also used in some communities during penitential rituals such as Yom Kippur Katan and optional prayer services called during times of communal distress. The exact modes of sounding can vary from location to location.

In an effort to improve the skills of shofar blowers, an International Day of Shofar Study is observed on Rosh Chodesh Elul, the start of the month preceding Rosh Hashanah.

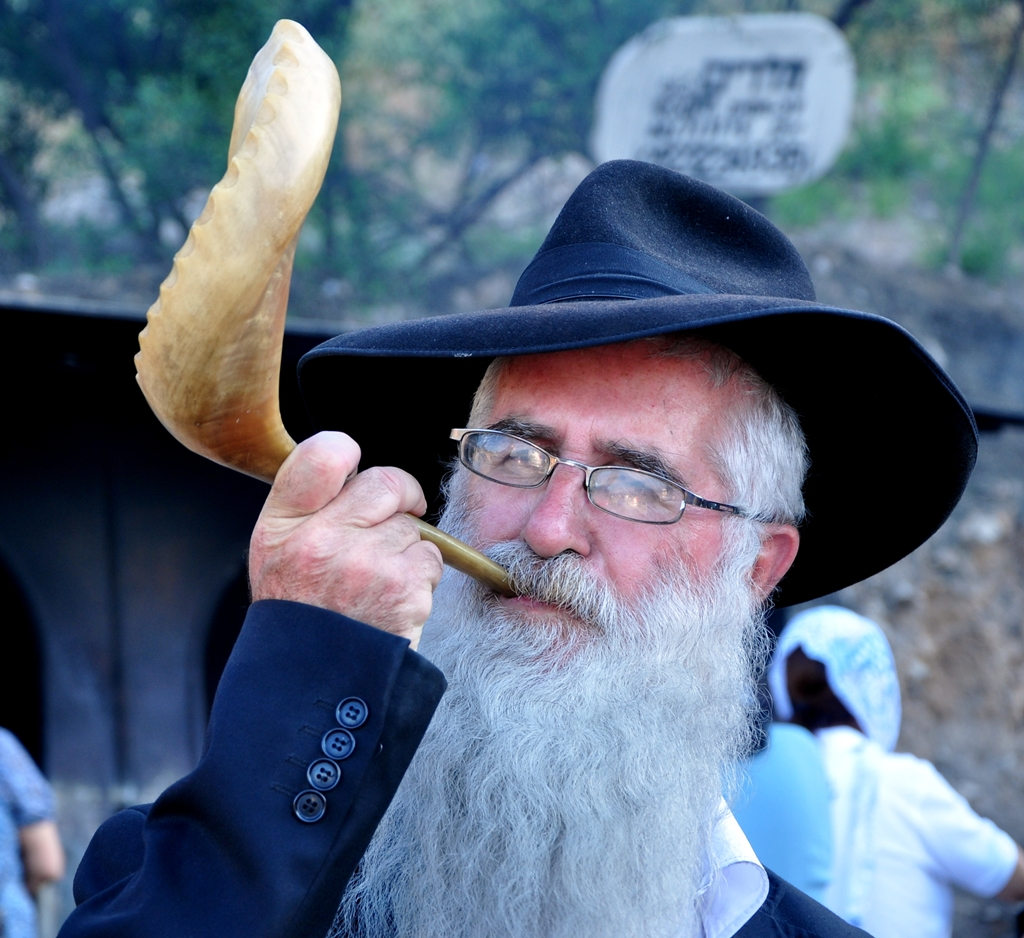
A Jewish Haredi man blowing a Shofar, 2012.

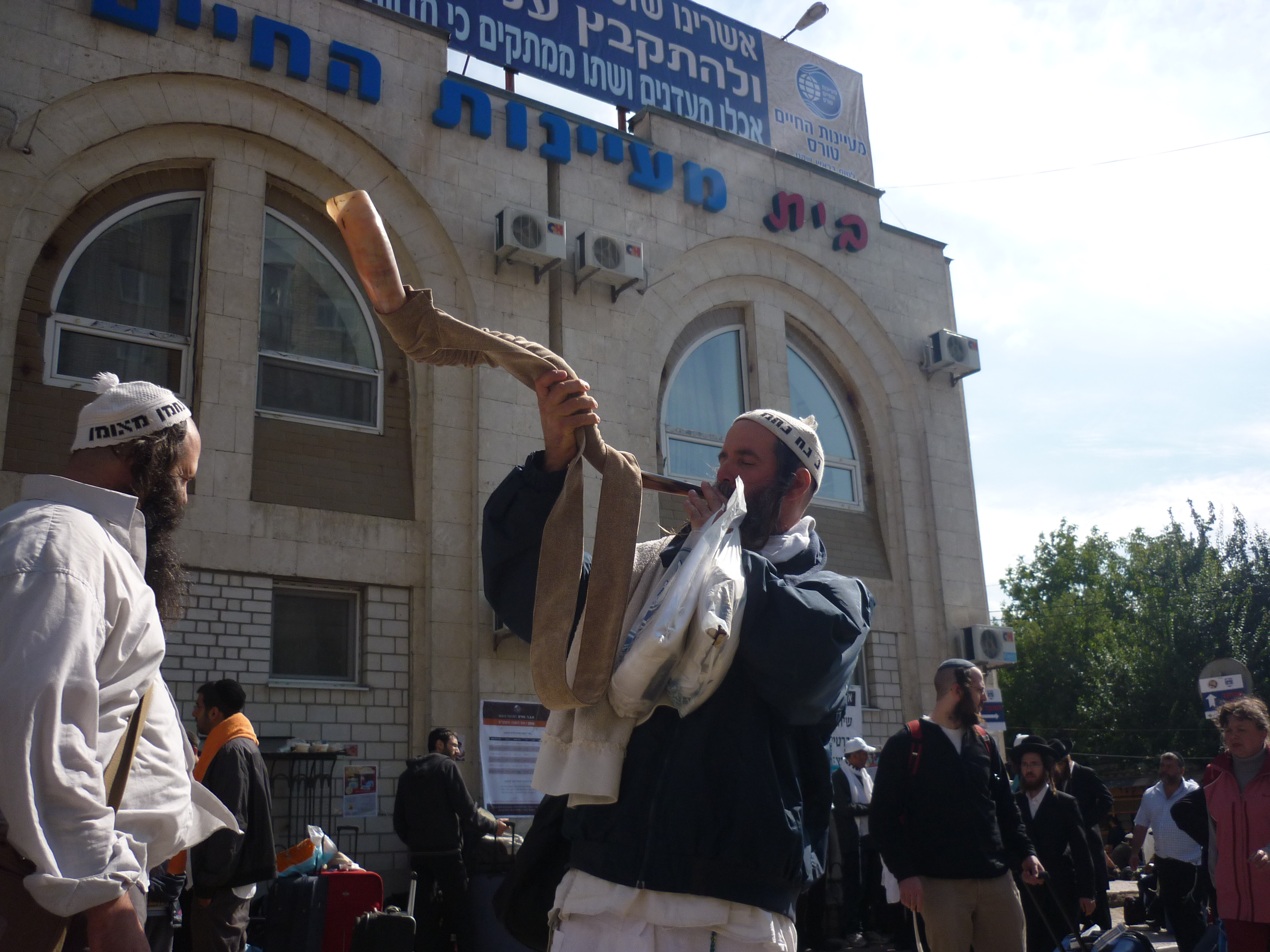
Hasidic Jew, blowing the kudu shofar in Uman, Ukraine, 2010.

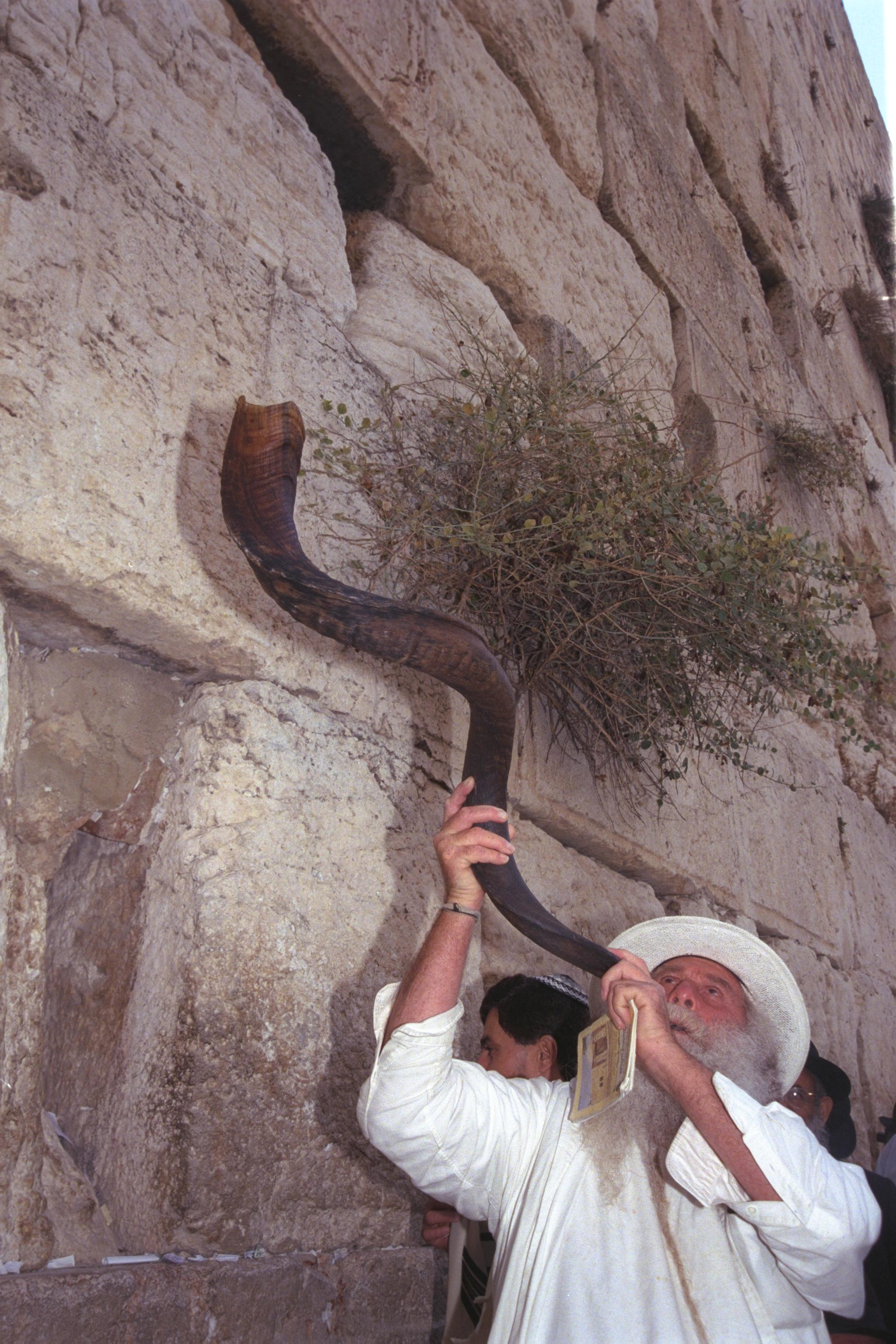
A Jewish Israeli man blows the shofar at the Western Wall, Jerusalem.

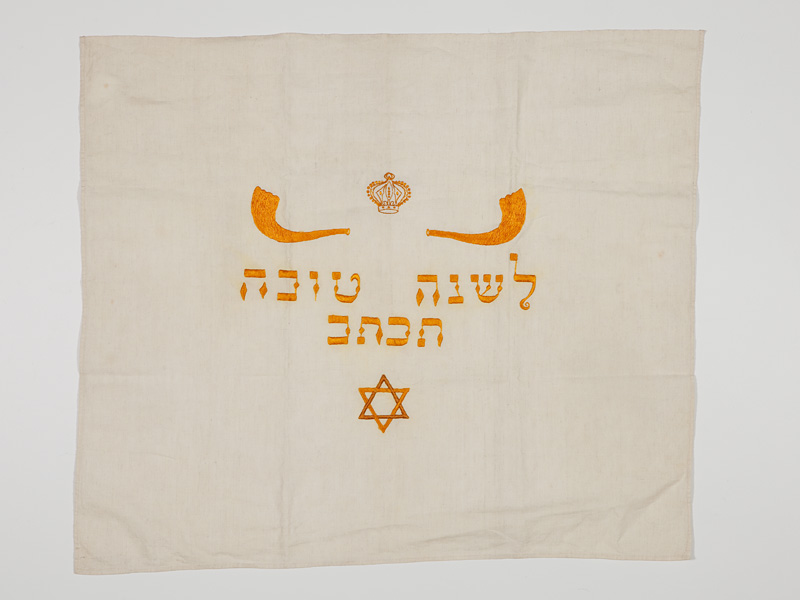
Linen schofar cover from the 20th century, in the collection of the Jewish Museum of Switzerland.

== Shofar campaign ==
The Public Shofar Campaign is a Chabad-Lubavitch innovation launched by the Lubavitcher Rebbe, Rabbi Menachem M. Schneerson, in 1953, just prior to Rosh Hashanah of that year (September 10). It was introduced as the first public mitzvah campaign designed to bring Jewish observance to individuals "wherever they are". The campaign served as a pilot program and a forerunner for subsequent mitzvah campaigns.

The campaign began on the streets of Brooklyn, N.Y., led by young rabbinical students from the Lubavitcher yeshiva. These students visited street corners, parks, and Jewish stores throughout Brooklyn. The primary early focus was ensuring those who could not attend synagogue had the opportunity to hear the shofar, especially patients in hospitals like St. John’s and Kings County Hospital.

While initially informal, the campaign came under the aegis of the Lubavitch Youth Organization of New York after its founding in 1955. Beginning in the late 1950s, the practice spread globally, carried by guests from Israel and around the world traveling to New York. The campaign was subsequently brought to Israel, Miami Beach, Detroit, and Milan. By the early 1970s, Chabad in California was bringing the Shofar Campaign to 15 hospitals. Local Chicago efforts began around 1967 in Skokie, eventually expanding to serve both hospital patients and the homebound. This effort spread beyond adherents of the Chabad movement with young men from other Jewish communities taking to the streets to help out other Jews.

In 1975, the Rebbe expanded the campaign to include the entire month of Elul. Furthermore, he emphasized reaching isolated soldiers (including the Israeli military) and Jews incarcerated in correctional facilities, leading to prisons like Sing Sing and the Federal Correctional Complex at Allenwood, Pa., being added to the itinerary. Today, the Shofar Campaign continues to operate in public parks, prisons, nursing homes, hospitals, and on intersections globally, including Jerusalem, Moscow, Los Angeles, and Brooklyn. In 2020, during the COVID-19 pandemic, the practice proved crucial, with Chabad organizing extensive public shofar events, such as 22 street corner blowings in Skokie, Illinois, and several more in other areas of Chicago, such as Rogers park and Lakeview.

== Non-religious usage ==
=== National liberation ===
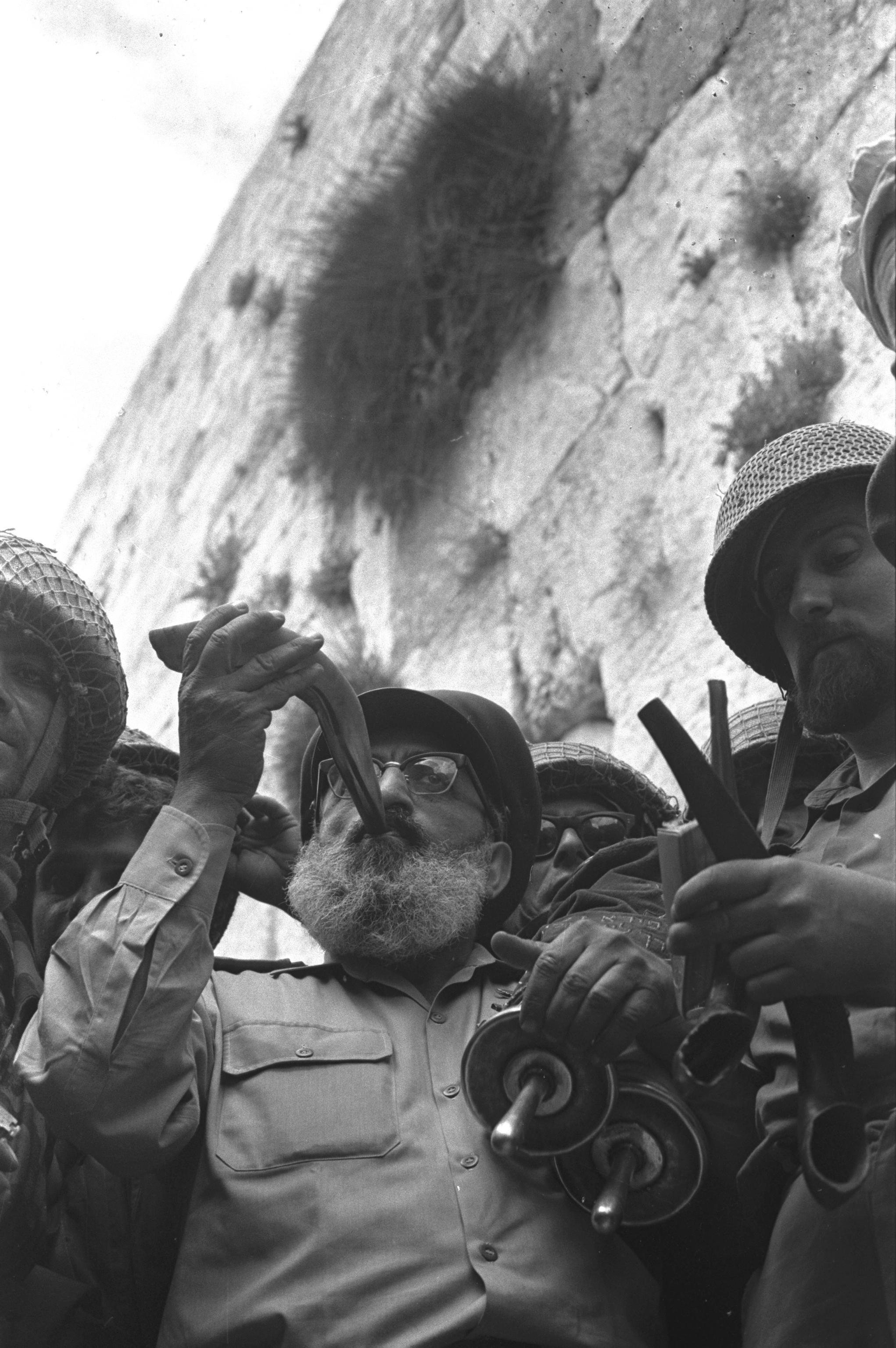
Shlomo Goren blowing the shofar in front of the Western Wall, June 1967

During the Ottoman and the British rule of Jerusalem, Jews were not allowed to sound the shofar at the Western Wall. After the Six-Day War, Rabbi Shlomo Goren famously approached the Wall and sounded the shofar. This fact inspired Naomi Shemer to add an additional line to her song "Jerusalem of Gold", saying, "a shofar calls out from the Temple Mount in the Old City."

The Shofar has been sounded as a sign of victory and celebration. Jewish elders were photographed blowing multiple shofars after hearing that the Nazis surrendered on 8 May 1945. The shofar has played a major role in the pro-Israel movement and often played in the Salute to Israel Parade and other pro-Israel demonstrations.

In the inauguration ceremony of the President of Israel, a shofar is blown once the President has been sworn in, followed by a call of "Long live the President".

=== American political use ===
An American group called Shofar Army, described by outsiders as Christian nationalists, have adopted the use of the shofar into their activities.

=== Non-religious musical usage ===
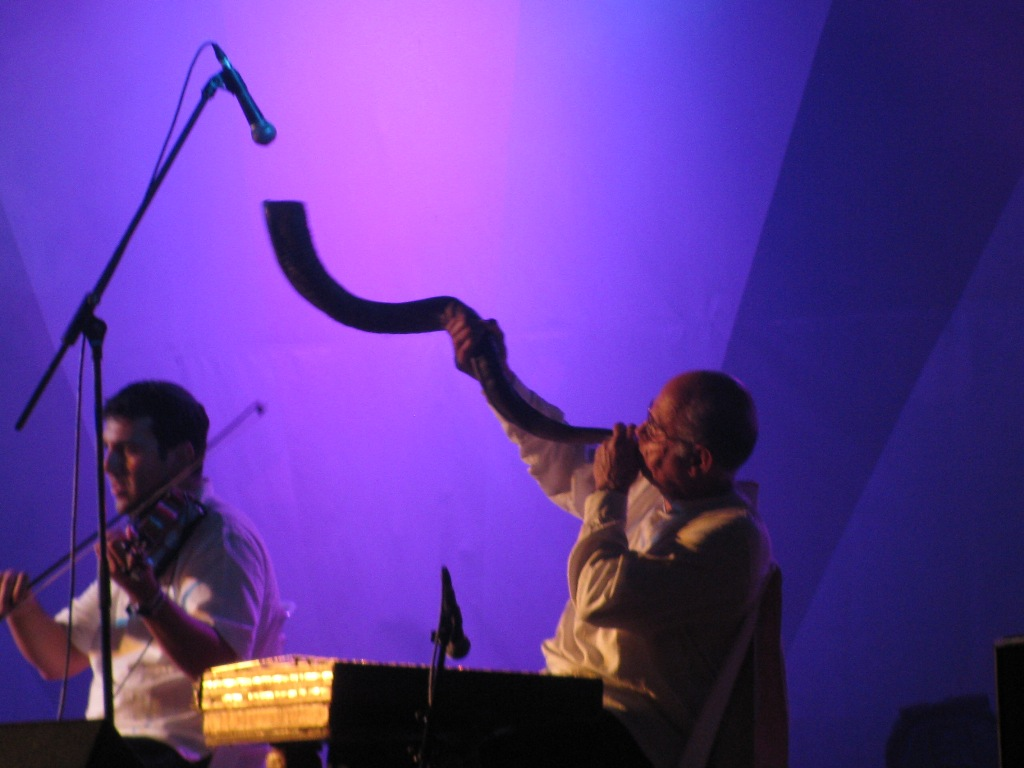
A musician blows the shofar during a performance by Shlomo Bar, 2009.

In pop music, the shofar is used by the Israeli Oriental metal band Salem in their adaptation of "Al Taster" (Psalm 27). The late trumpeter Lester Bowie played a shofar with the Art Ensemble of Chicago. In the film version of the musical Godspell, the first act opens with cast member David Haskell blowing the shofar. In his performances, Israeli composer and singer Shlomo Gronich uses the shofar to produce a wide range of notes. Since 1988, Rome-based American composer Alvin Curran's project Shofar features the shofar as a virtuoso solo instrument and in combination with sets of natural and electronic sounds. Madonna used a shofar played by Yitzhak Sinwani on the Confessions Tour and the album Confessions on a Dance Floor for the song "Isaac", based on Im Nin'alu. In 2003, The Howard Stern Show featured a contest called "Blow the Shofar", which asked callers to correctly identify popular songs played on the shofar. Additionally, Stern Show writer Benjy Bronk has repeatedly used a shofar in his antics. The shofar is sometimes used in Western classical music. Edward Elgar's oratorio The Apostles includes the sound of a shofar, although other instruments, such as the flugelhorn, are usually used instead.

The shofar has been used in a number of films, both as a sound effect and as part of musical underscores. Elmer Bernstein incorporated the shofar into several cues for his score for Cecil B. DeMille's The Ten Commandments; one of the shofar calls recorded by Bernstein was later reused by the sound editors for Return of the Jedi for the Ewoks' horn calls. Jerry Goldsmith's scores to the films Alien and Planet of the Apes also incorporate the shofar in their orchestration.

== Health issues ==
The physical demands of sustaining pressurized blowing through an embouchure may be associated with health risks for the player caused by holding the instrument, pressing the shofar against lips, and the pressurized exhalation needed to produce and sustain blowing pressure. During the COVID-19 epidemic, there was considerable discussion of risks and mitigation measures relating to respiratory transmission of infectious disease though the use of the shofar in communal settings.

== See also ==
- Adhan, the Islamic call to prayer
- Church bells
- Conch (instrument)
- Erkencho
- Shankha
- Shofar blowing
- Bukkehorn
- Shofar Association of America
