= America, an Epic Rhapsody =

Orchestral work composed by Ernest Bloch

America, an Epic Rhapsody (often shortened to America) is an orchestral work composed between 1926 and 1927 by Swiss-born Ernest Bloch, as a tribute to the country to which he had emigrated in 1916. The work consists of three movements, covering the history of the United States and entitled '1620', '1861-1865' and '1926'. It was first performed in New York.

According to Bloch, the idea for America first came to him as he arrived in the United States in 1916. This idea reoccurred to him as he studied some works of Walt Whitman in 1925, and the following year he composed the rhapsody's anthem while in San Francisco.

In a 1927 contest sponsored by Musical America, the rhapsody won the $3000 prize for the best symphonic work on an American theme by an American composer, beating ninety-one other entries to gain the unanimous vote of the judges. On 21 December 1928, following this success, America was performed simultaneously in five American cities: Chicago, New York, Boston, Philadelphia and San Francisco.
