= Violin Sonata No. 1 (Bloch) =

Ernest Bloch's Violin Sonata No. 1 is a sonata for violin and piano. It is regarded as one of the masterpieces of the violin repertoire.

Composed in Cleveland in 1920, the work makes considerable demands of both technique and endurance from the violinist. Bloch himself described the sonata as a "tormented work", and Roger Sessions described it as having a characteristic "mood of pessimism, irony and nostalgia".

== Structure ==
There are three movements:

1. Agitato
2. Molto quieto
3. Moderato.

The first movement begins with driving, toccata-like idea which transitions to a characteristic Hebrew-inflected melody; these materials are extensively developed leading to a tormented, expressive coda. The second movement begins gently, with a sustained cantilena for the violin over a quiet piano arpeggios, but introduces more agitated material as it proceeds. The final movement is launched with heavily-chorded dance measures, but as the movement proceeds material from the opening two movements is revisited before the work ends quietly.

== Premiere performance ==
The work was premiered in New York City in February 1921 by Paul Kochanski and Arthur Rubinstein.
