= Ada Clement =

American pianist and music teacher

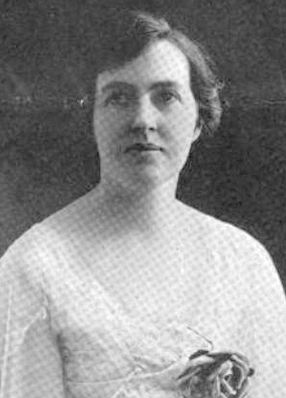
- Ada Clement, from a 1921 publication
- Born: 1878; San Francisco, California
- Died: July 18, 1952 (aged 73–74); Mill Valley, California
- Education: Pianist, piano teacher
- Occupation: Director of the San Francisco Conservatory of Music.

Ada Clement (1878 – July 18, 1952) was an American pianist and music teacher. She co-founded what would become the San Francisco Conservatory of Music.

== Life ==
Clement was born in San Francisco in 1878. She studied piano with Mrs. John Vance Cheeney and spent her later childhood on a ranch in Shasta County, California. Upon returning to San Francisco, she studied piano with Mrs. Oscar Cushing, and later with Oscar Weil. She was present on the day of the 1906 San Francisco earthquake when she turned back from going to her piano lessons by the devastation that she found in the city.

Clement went to Europe in 1909 to take piano lessons with Josef Lhévinne and Harold Bauer. In autumn 1917, Clement with friend and lover, Lillian Hodghead, opened the Ada Clement Piano School, which was initially based at the home of her parents. There were four studios and three pianos and just four pupils.

In 1923 the school was offering courses in a number of musical instruments; it was renamed the San Francisco Conservatory of Music. The conservatory taught music theory, composition as well as singing. Ada was a dedicated teacher and co-director of the Conservatory until 1925 when she was succeeded by her friend, tutor and lover Ernest Bloch. He had joined the faculty in 1924 when he taught a summer school the year before and the success of this saw him appointed as the new director. The five years he was there saw the conservatory and its reputation increase. Bloch left to devote himself to composition but he remained a friend of Clement. Clement and Hodgehead resumed the leadership.

Clement died in 1952 at home from cancer. Ernest Bloch wrote a special composition "In Memorium" for her.
