= Suzanne Bloch =

American musician (1907–2002)

Suzanne Bloch (August 9, 1907 – January 29, 2002) was a Swiss-American musician and an influential pioneer of the early music revival during the 20th century.

== Biography ==
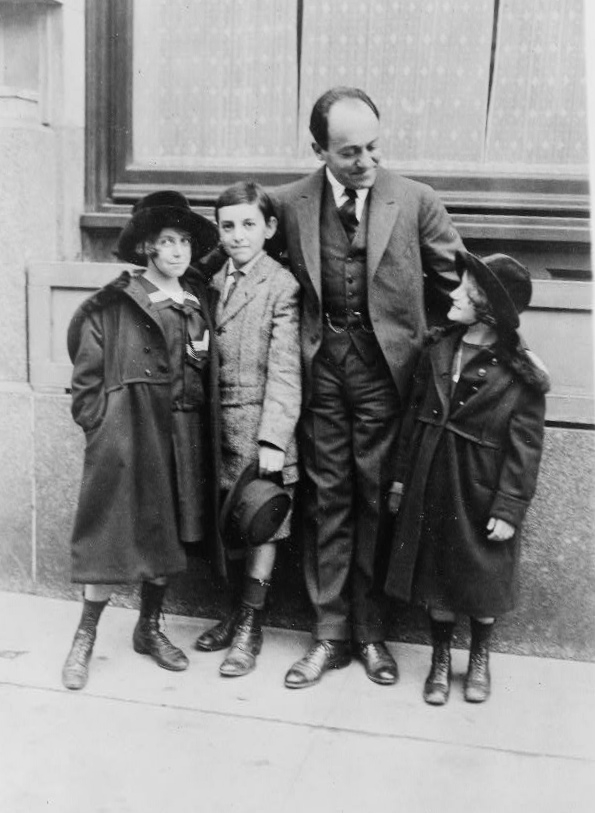
Ernest Bloch with children Suzanne, Ivan and Lucienne

Suzanne Bloch was born in Geneva in 1907 into the family of composer Ernest Bloch. The family moved to New York in 1916 when Ernst Bloch took on teaching and conducting responsibilities there. She went to Paris to study music with Nadia Boulanger in 1925, and decided to become a lute player after hearing an early-music concert. She went on to study music in Paris and Berlin, and she met Arnold Dolmetsch in England in 1933. Dolmetsch sold her a lute from 1600 that he had restored himself. In 1935 she performed at the Dolmetsch Early Music Festival in Haslemere, and soon afterward returned to New York, where she began her concert career.

Her career as a lutenist was cut short in the 1950s by repetitive stress syndrome brought on by the modern heavily built Hermann Hauser lutes that she played, but her condition allowed her to continue to play early keyboards and sing. She was one of the founding members of the Lute Society of America in the 1970s. She died in New York in 2002.

== Family ==
After an earlier marriage ended in divorce, Suzanne Bloch married mathematician Paul Althaus Smith in 1935. They had two sons, one of whom had autism. She raised their autistic son alone, and was able to help him gain nearly total social functionality through self-designed art therapy. He eventually became an independent artist-painter.
