= San Francisco Conservatory of Music =

Music school in California, U.S.

Coordinates: 37°46′32″N 122°25′13″W

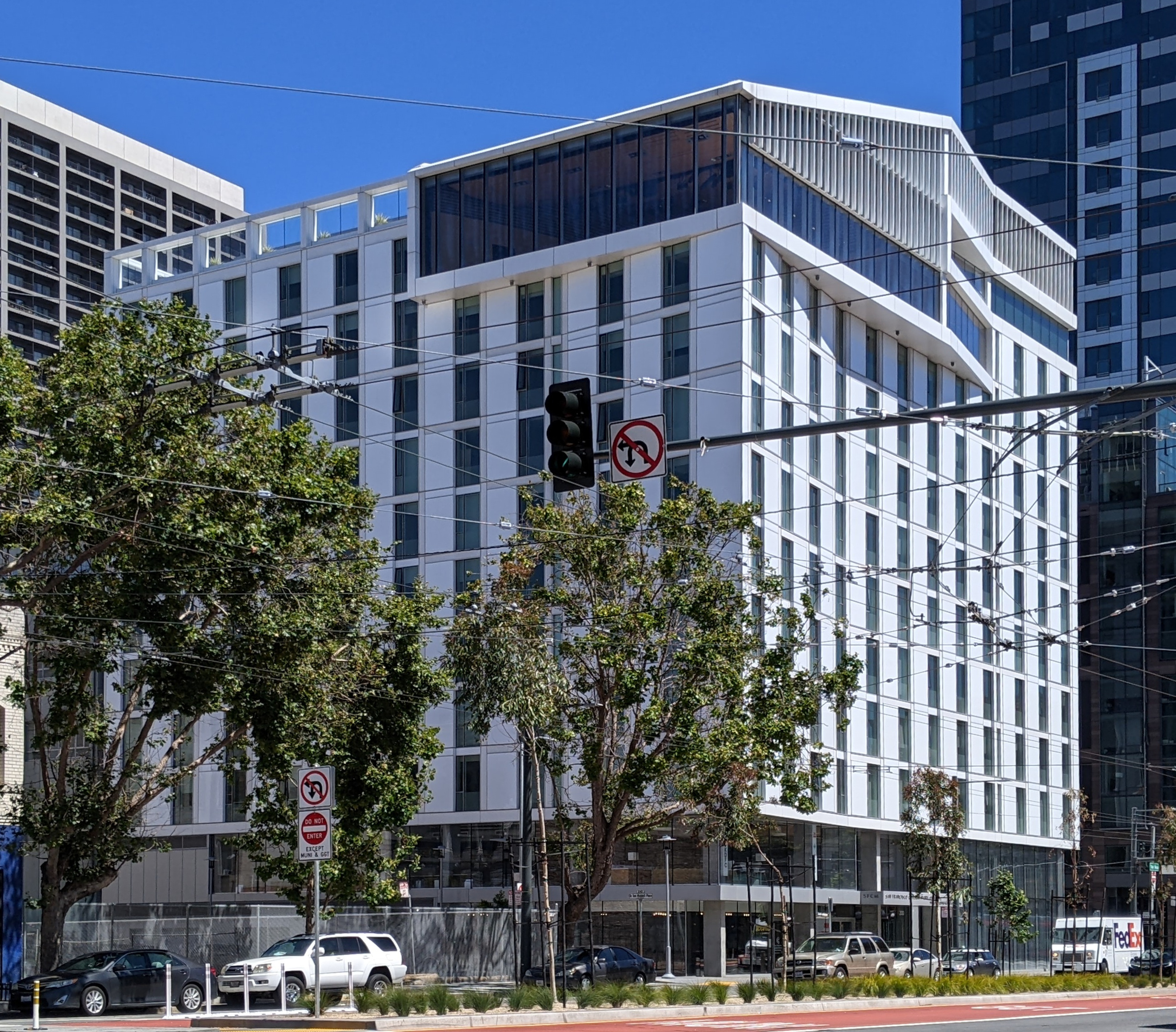
- The SFCM's Bowes Center building in 2022
- Former name: Ada Clement Piano School
- Type: Private music conservatory
- Established: 1917
- Founders: Ada Clement, Lillian Hodghead
- Accreditation: WSCUC
- Endowment: 43,498,000
- President: David H. Stull
- Dean: Jonas Wright
- Academic staff: 173
- Students: 440 (2024)
- Location: 50 Oak Street; San Francisco, California; 94102
- Colors: Raspberry and gold
- Website: www.sfcm.edu

The San Francisco Conservatory of Music (SFCM) is a private music conservatory in San Francisco, California, United States. As of 2025, it had 447 students.

== History ==
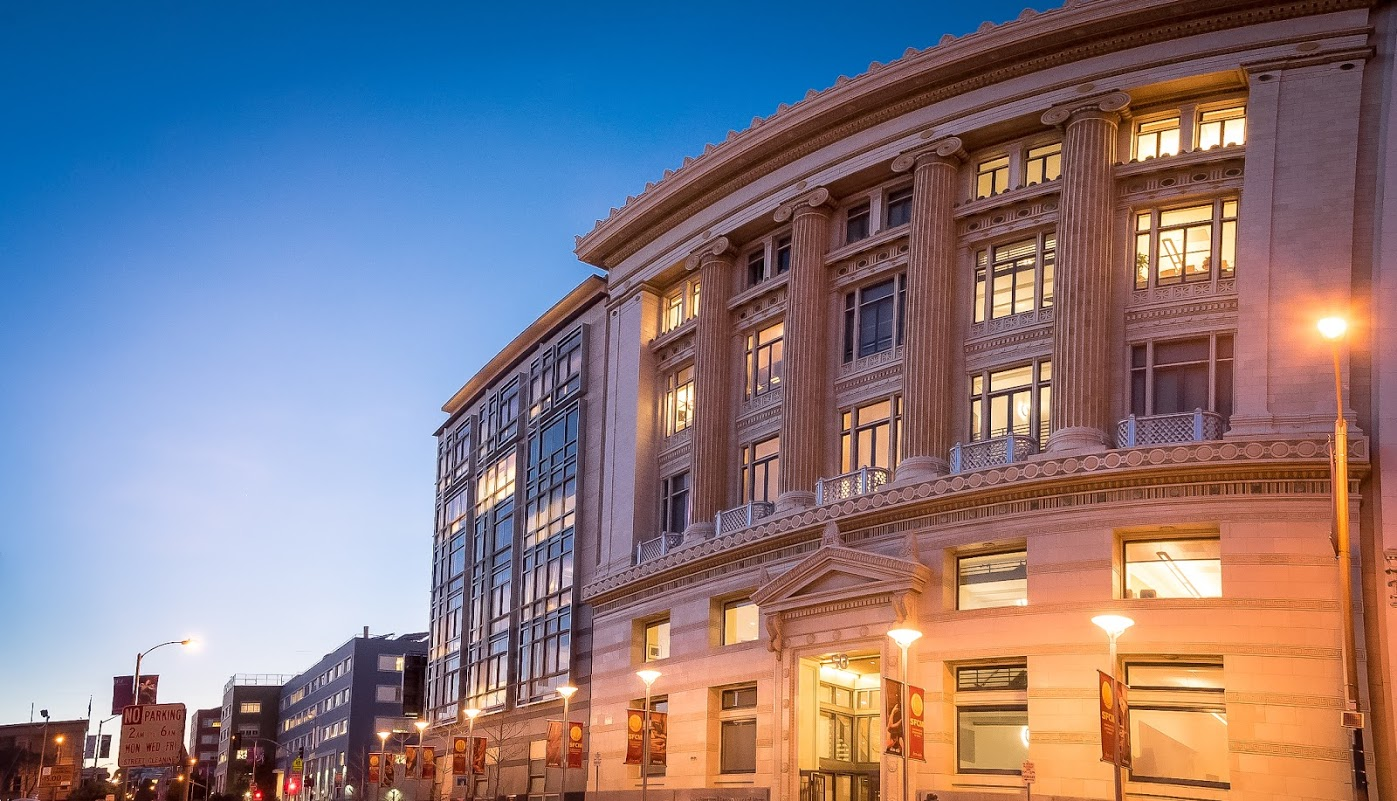
The Oak Street building in 2017 (fisheye perspective)

The San Francisco Conservatory of Music was founded in 1917 by Ada Clement and Lillian Hodghead as the Ada Clement Piano School. In 1923, the school was incorporated as the San Francisco Conservatory of Music, becoming the first music conservatory on the west coast. In 1956 the Conservatory moved from Sacramento Street to 1201 Ortega Street, the home of a former infant shelter. It resided there for fifty years, before moving to its current location at 50 Oak Street in 2006.

In 2020, the SFCM added the new Bowes Center at 200 Van Ness Avenue (across from Davies Symphony Hall), a 12-story building that includes dorms (eight floors) with acoustic insulation for 400 of its students, 27 rent-controlled apartments for residents of the older building that was replaced by the construction, and some public performing spaces, including a penthouse concert room with views towards the north and west. The Bowes Center's $200 million cost was largely funded by donors, including $46.4 million from the William K. Bowes Jr. Foundation. The San Francisco Chronicle's architecture critic John King characterized the building's design as "[pushing] against the strict rules of the historic district but [respecting] the air of gravitas. For starters, the building is skinned in translucent glass that conceals insulation and the structural frame – a touch that adds a milky visual depth ..." As of 2021, the Bowes Center was envisaged to fully open to the public in February 2022.

In 2020, SFCM announced a partnership with the talent management company Opus 3 Artists, and in May 2022 it acquired the Dutch classical music label, Pentatone, funded by a private donor. The music website "Classical Voice" described this "combination of a music-education organization with two professional music businesses" as "unusual."

== Admissions ==
In SFCM's audition process, many of the areas needed to enroll feature a "prescreening" round (which consists of essays, video recordings of them playing, transcripts, and for composition majors – portfolio of works), including composition, voice studies, strings, conducting, TAC (technology and applied composition)...etc. A student can be denied or accepted based on the pre-screening results. Once the student is accepted beyond the prescreening round, they are called to San Francisco for a final audition to get to know the faculty, and perform for their chosen major's instructor. Once that is clear, the student is either accepted or denied admission into the conservatory. Some areas of the conservatory are more competitive than others, such as composition [which only admits 8–10 students a year out of hundreds of applicants], and the strings department. The faculty values the applicant's personality and musicianship in the auditions.

=== Directors ===
- Ada Clement and Lillian Hodghead, 1917–1925
- Ernest Bloch, 1925–1930
- Ada Clement and Lillian Hodghead, 1930–1951
- Albert Elkus, 1951–1957
- Robin Laufer, 1957–1966
- Milton Salkind, 1966–1990
- Stephen Brown, 1990–1991
- Milton Salkind (Acting President), 1991–1992
- Colin Murdoch, 1992–2013
- David Stull, 2013–present

== Notable faculty (past and present) ==
- Christine Abraham (voice; also an alumnus)
- John Adams (composition, founder of new music ensemble)
- Jeffrey Anderson (tuba)
- Elinor Armer (composition)
- Mason Bates (composition)
- Luciano Chessa (music history and literature)
- David Conte (composition)
- Patricia Craig (voice)
- Jacques Desjardins (music theory, associate director of new music ensemble)
- David Garner (composition)
- Jake Heggie (composition)
- Andrew Imbrie (composition)
- Eugene Izotov (oboe)
- Mark Lawrence (trombone)
- Lester Lynch (voice)
- Susanne Mentzer (voice)
- Garrick Ohlsson (piano)
- David Tanenbaum (guitar)
- Ivan Tcherepnin (composition)
- Indre Viskontas (soprano, neuroscientist)
- Deborah Voigt (voice)
- Nancy Zhou (violin)

== Notable alumni ==
- George Duke (jazz fusion keyboardist, singer, and producer)
- Barbara Eden (singer)
- Léopold Simoneau (tenor)
- Peter Scott Lewis (composer)
- Miguel del Águila (composer)
- Shahad Paranj (composer)
- David Garner (composer)
- Isaac Stern (violinist)
- Aaron Jay Kernis, Pulitzer Prize winning and Grammy Award-winning composer, member of the Yale School of Music faculty
- Carla Kihlstedt (experimental violinist)
- Sepideh Moafi (singer)
