= Shofar Association of America =

Chabad Meshichist organization based in New York City

- Shofar Association of America Inc.
- ארגון שופר אסוסיאיישן דאמריקה
- Formation: July 10, 1979
- Founder: Rabbi Yitzchok Springer
- Founded at: 770 Eastern Parkway
- Type: Nonprofit organization
- Tax ID no.: 0568207
- Legal status: Non-profit
- Location: New York City, United States
- Subsidiaries: TruePeace.org, SOS-Israel.com
- Affiliations: Chabad messianism

Shofar Association of America or Shofar Association of America Inc. (Hebrew: ארגון שופר אסוסיאיישן דאמריקה) is a Chabad messianism-affiliated religious and political advocacy organization based in the Crown Heights, neighborhood of Brooklyn, New York, United States. The organization was founded on July 10, 1979 by Yitzchok 'Itche' Springer, a Chabad activist involved in several public campaigns promoting the teachings and political positions of The Rebbe Menachem Mendel Schneerson. After Rebbe Menachem Mendel Schneerson's death in 1994, the organization became one of the first Meshichist organizations.

The organization is known for sponsoring public campaigns and newspaper advertisements promoting Schneerson's teachings on Jewish identity, Israeli territorial policy, and messianic redemption and his status as Moshiach. Following Schneerson's death in 1994, the organization became associated with activists within Chabad messianism who continued to promote Schneerson as the Jewish Messiah and encouraged the spread of the Besurat HaGeulah ("message of redemption").

== History ==
Throughout Menachem Mendel Schneerson years as the 7th Rebbe of Chabad he gave numerous extensive Sichas on many religious, spiritual and political topics at Chabad Headquarters; 770 Eastern Parkway. During the 1970's around the time of The Camp David Accords the Rebbe spoke extensively against returning any land belonging to Israel. and particularly in Chabad, the concept of a complete Israel is referred to as Shleimus HaAretz. During this era, as the question of "Who is a Jew?" was being discussed and legislated in the Israeli Government for Aliyah and citizenship status, the Rebbe promoted the strict acceptance of only Halachic Jewish status and Ultra Orthodox conversions.

Given the Rebbe's talks, in 1979 Rabbi Yitzchok Springer, a Chabad activist who held several communal roles within the movement founded the organization. Springer served as chairman of the association and was involved in various Chabad-related initiatives and committees advocating for Shleimus HaAretz. According to Chabadpedia (A project of Chabad Info) Israeli politician Avner Shaki founder of the Religious Education Movement in Israel also helped found the Shofar Association of America in the United States. Other Chabad Hasidim involved were Rabbis Avraham Shlomo Sharf, Yekutiel Menachem Rapp, Shalom Horvitz and Avraham Shmuel Levin.

Springer and other activists sought to raise awareness and opposition to territorial concessions by Israel as well as oppose what they viewed as recognition of non-Orthodox conversions in Israeli civil law. The organization's name was chosen because its activities were compared to the blast of a shofar, publicly sounding an alarm about perceived threats to Jewish identity and Israeli national security.

The organization's work is part of The Three Integrities, Shleimus HaTorah (Integrity of the Torah) Shleimus Ha'Am (Integrity of the People) and Shleimus Ha'Aretz (Integrity of the Land).

== Post Rebbe's death ==
After the death of Rebbe Menachem Mendel Schneerson in 1994, some followers of Chabad, who became known as Meshichists, rejected the Rebbe's death and began spreading word that he is the Jewish Messiah. The Shofar Association of America became one of the first Meshichist organizations, it published multiple ads announcing the rebbe's status as living Moshiach, most controversial and well known was a full page ad in The New York Times in 1997, "The third of Tammuz is not The Rebbe's yahrzeit. – 1997" claiming that the Rebbe did not die on June 12, 1994.

== Newspaper ad campaigns ==
One of the association's bigger campaigns was the publication of full page and half page advertisements in national newspapers in the US and Israel including most prominently The New York Times. Between the 1980s and the 2000s the group sponsored numerous ads supporting and raising awareness for the Rebbe's positions most prominently, in the New York Times, and after the Rebbe's death many more ads supporting Chabad messianism.

- "Moshiach is coming and we must make the final preparations." - 1992
- The third of Tammuz is not The Rebbe's yahrzeit. – 1997
- On Gimmel Tammuz the sun did not set - 1998
- Think Moshiach Bring Moshiach – 1999
- In Honor of the Rebbe on his 102nd Birthday – 2004
- What do you call someone who truly believes in Moshiach?" – 2006
- A single good deed will change the world forever. Will it be yours? – 2007
- Attention Prime Minister Shimon Perez! – 2007
- "Do everything you can to bring Moshiach" – 2008

== True Peace ==
TruePeace.org was a website and initiative by the Shofar Association of America active between in 1998 and 2025 described a s a pro Israel think tank. The movement was "dedicated to educating the public regarding the current situation in Israel" Meshichist websites torah4blind.org and Moshiach.net describes it as: "Dedicated to educating the public regarding the current situation in Israel, based on Torah sources, with special emphasis on the opinion and teachings of the Lubavitcher Rebbe." Resources about the Israeli–Palestinian conflict from TruePeace.org are used and citied by the primary Chabad educational organization, Merkos L'Inyonei Chinuch in its materials for via the Chabad Youth and Teen Club. The organization also operated sos-israel.com leading up to Israeli disengagement from the Gaza Strip.

== Publications ==
- Who is a Jew? : 30 questions and answers about this controversial and divisive issue 1987 by Jacob Immanuel Schochet.
