= Concerto Grosso No. 1 (Bloch) =

Composition by Ernest Bloch

Concerto Grosso No. 1 for string orchestra with piano obbligato is a 1925 concerto grosso composed by Ernest Bloch.

The work was Bloch's first of two published concerti grossi. According to Alexander J. Morin, the work was created in response to complaints by Bloch's students at the Cleveland Institute of Music about "the inadequacies of tonality in shaping the music for the next century."

Music critic Olin Downes wrote, "The Bloch concerto was on the whole the best written and the most effective of the new works, even though it lacks some of the power and color" of other works. A third concerto grosso evolved into his work Sinfonia Breve.
