= Lucienne Bloch =

Swiss-American artist and photographer (1909–1999)

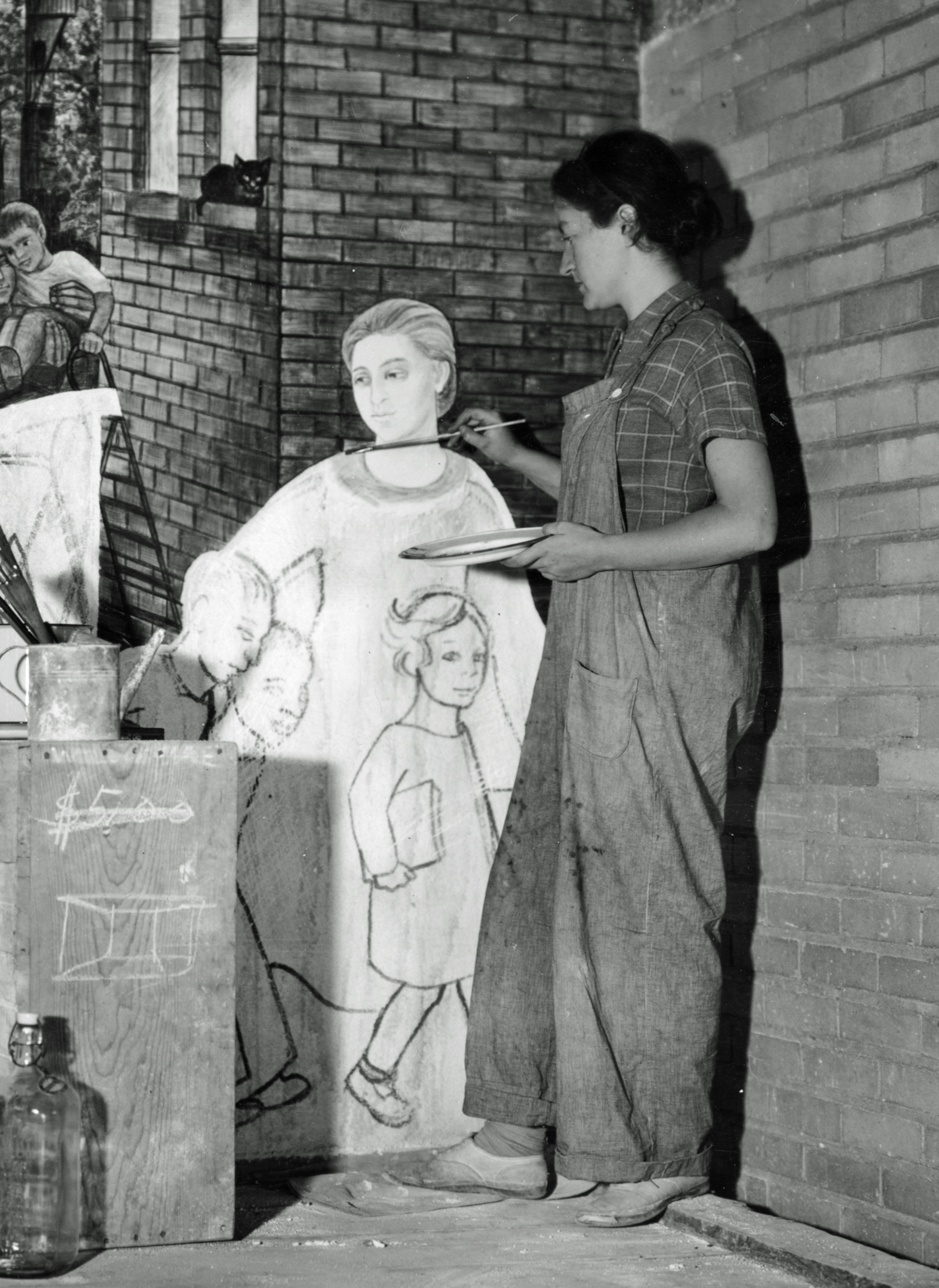
- Born: Lucienne Bloch; January 5, 1909; Geneva, Switzerland
- Died: March 13, 1999 (aged 90); Gualala, California, United States
- Education: École nationale supérieure des Beaux-Arts
- Known for: Sculpture, painting, photography
- Spouse: Stephen Pope Dimitroff
- Patrons: WPA, FAP

Lucienne Bloch (1909–1999) was a Swiss-born American artist. She was best known for her murals and for her association with the Mexican artist Diego Rivera, for whom she produced the only existing photographs of Rivera's mural Man at the Crossroads, painted in 1933 and destroyed in January 1934 at Rockefeller Center in New York City.

== Biography ==
Bloch was born on January 5, 1909 in Geneva, Switzerland, the daughter of composer, Ernest Bloch. In 1917, the Bloch family immigrated to America. Lucienne attended the École nationale supérieure des Beaux-Arts in Paris at 14, apprenticing with sculptor Antoine Bourdelle and painter Andre Lhote.

In 1929, she pioneered the design of glass sculpture for the Royal Leerdam Crystal Glass Factory in the Netherlands. When Frank Lloyd Wright saw her glass works and spoke with her in New York, he invited her to teach at his architectural school, Taliesin East, where she worked with artist and muralist Santiago Martínez Delgado and other Taliesin fellows.

In 1931, Bloch had met and began her apprenticeship with Diego Rivera on his frescoes in New York (1931, 1933) and Detroit (1932). She also formed a close friendship with Rivera's wife Frida Kahlo, and they became each other's companion and confidant. In 1932 she accompanied Kahlo to Mexico when Kahlo's mother became ill. She was also with Kahlo in Detroit when Kahlo had her miscarriage.

A prolific photographer, Bloch contributed many photographs of Rivera and Kahlo to biographical works about them. She took the only existing photographs of Rivera's (controversially) destroyed mural, Man at the Crossroads, in Rockefeller Center Plaza in New York City. She created five portfolios of photographs of Rivera and Kahlo, including photos of Kahlo's paintings in progress, and the artists in New York City, Detroit, and Mexico.

Block married fellow artist Stephen Pope Dimitroff (1910–1996) and the couple created murals for a time before Dimitroff became a union organizer in Flint, Michigan.

From 1935 to 1939, Bloch was employed by the WPA/FAP (Works Progress Administration/Federal Arts Project). As a WPA/FAP artist, she completed murals for public buildings, including the House of Detention for Women in New York City, and the Fort Thomas, Kentucky post office.

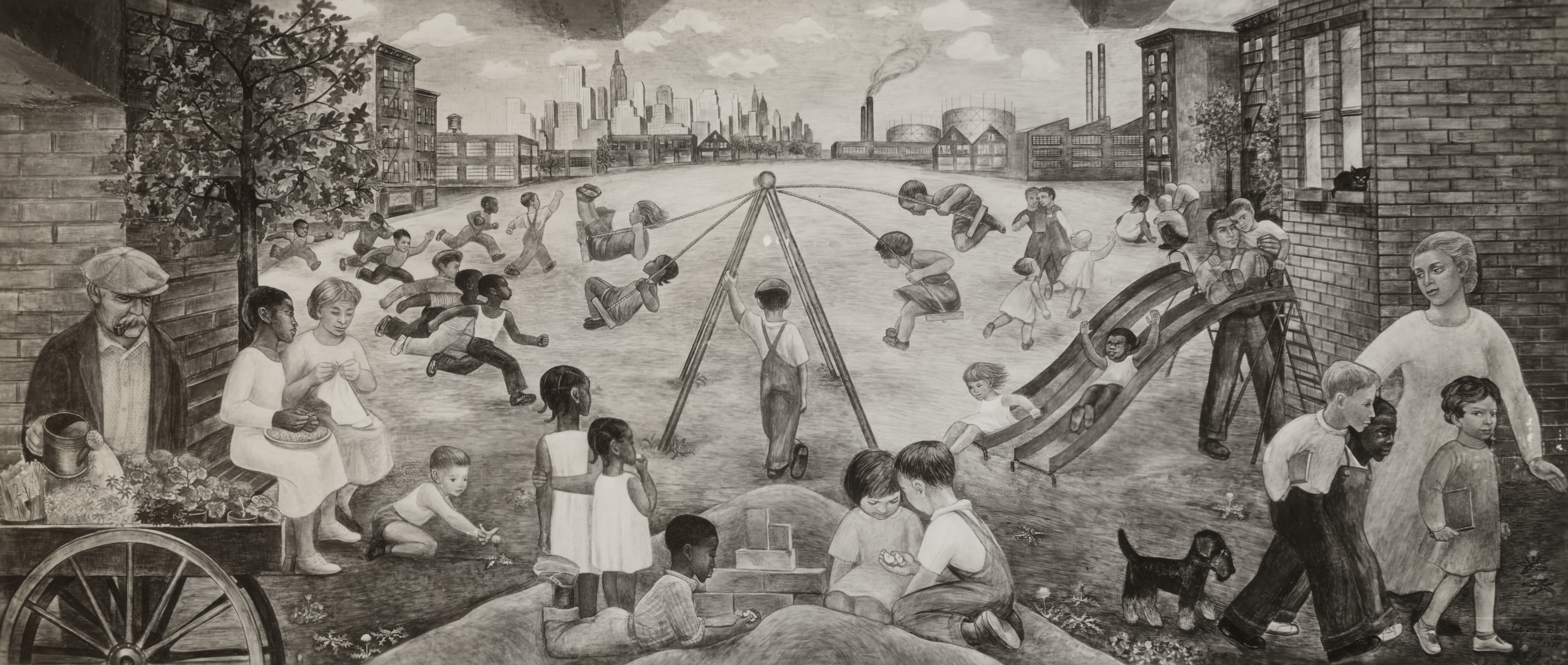
The Cycle of a Woman's Life, 1936 print

The mural for the House of Detention for Women commissioned by the Federal Arts Project was entitled The Cycle of a Woman's Life. It was planned to cover three wall of the 12th-floor recreation room, but only one wall was completed.

She also illustrated numerous children's books, of which the Library of Congress lists:

- I Want to Fly, by Anita Brenner, (1943)
- Willie's Walk to Grandmama, by Margaret Wise Brown and Rockbridge Campbell (1944)
- Keep Singing, Keep Humming: A Collection of Play and Story Songs, by Margaret Bradford Boni (1946)
- Smart Little Boy and His Smart Little Kitty, by Louise Woodcock (1947)
- Is it Hard? Is it Easy? by Mary McBurney Green (1948)
- Everybody Eats, by Mary McBurney Green (1950)
- Sandpipers, Edith Thacher Hurd (1961)
- Starfish, Edith Thacher Hurd (1962)

In 1956 Bloch's prints were included in the exhibition "Women Printmakers" at the Philadelphia Museum of Art.

In 1964 Bloch was interviewed for the Archives of American Art New Deal and the Arts Project now in the Smithsonian Institution.

Bloch died on March 13, 1999 in Gualala, California. Her work is in the National Gallery of Art and The New York Public Library.
