= Ernest Bloch =

Swiss-born American composer (1880–1959)

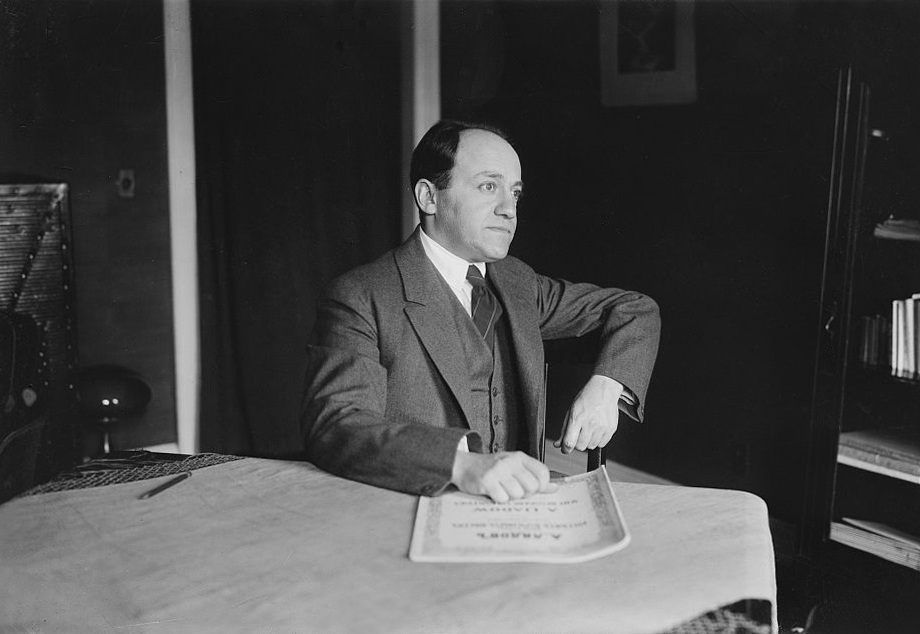
Bloch in 1917

Ernest Bloch (/blɒk/; German: [blɔx]; July 24, 1880 – July 15, 1959) was a Swiss-born American composer. He is recognized as one of the most significant Swiss composers in history. Several of his most notable compositions reflect his Jewish heritage. As well as producing musical scores, Bloch had an academic career that culminated in his recognition as Professor Emeritus at the University of California, Berkeley in 1952.

== Biography ==
Bloch was born in Geneva on July 24, 1880, to Jewish parents. He began playing the violin at age 9, and began composing soon after. He studied music at the conservatory in Brussels, where his teachers included the celebrated Belgian violinist Eugène Ysaÿe. He then traveled around Europe, moving to Germany (where he studied composition from 1900 to 1901 with Iwan Knorr at the Hoch Conservatory in Frankfurt), on to Paris in 1903 and back to Geneva before settling in the United States in 1916, taking US citizenship in 1924. He held several teaching appointments in the US, where his pupils included George Antheil, Frederick Jacobi, Quincy Porter, Bernard Rogers, and Roger Sessions.

In 1917, Bloch became the first teacher of composition at the Mannes School of Music, a post he held for three years. In December 1920 he was appointed the first musical director of the newly formed Cleveland Institute of Music, a post he held until 1925. In 1919 the San Francisco Symphony gave two of the earliest performances of his Schelomo, receiving high praise from multiple critics. Ada Clement and Lillian Hodghead of the newly named San Francisco Conservatory of Music visited Bloch in Cleveland in 1923 and invited him to teach at the Conservatory the following summer. He had previously been encouraged to come to San Francisco by Alfred Hertz and Temple Emanu El cantor Reuben Rinder. In 1925 Bloch resigned from the Cleveland Institute, where he had not been happy, and relocated to San Francisco. He was named the director of the Conservatory and remained in that position until 1930, when the school was running low on funds. He returned to Switzerland, where he composed his "Avodath Hakodesh" ("Sacred Service") before returning to the US in 1939.

Bloch joined the music faculty at Berkeley in 1941 and taught there one semester each year until his retirement in 1952. He and his wife lived primarily in the small coastal community of Agate Beach, Oregon. In 1947 he was among the founders of the Music Academy of the West summer conservatory.

In 1952 he was named a professor emeritus at the University of California, even though he had not been a full-time faculty member. He composed "In Memoriam" that year after the death of Ada Clement.

He died on July 15, 1959, in Portland, Oregon, of cancer at the age of 78. In keeping with a special tradition, his daughter, Lucienne Bloch, and her husband, Steve Dimitroff, prepared several death masks of Ernest Bloch. This once-common practice was usually undertaken to create a memento or portrait of the deceased, but it is unusual for an immediate family member to make the death mask. The Center for Creative Photography and the San Francisco Conservatory of Music each have a copy of Bloch's death mask.

== Music ==
Bloch's compositions – in particular the Suite hébraïque for viola and orchestra, Baal Shem for violin and piano (later orchestrated) and Schelomo for cello and orchestra – often reflect his Jewish heritage. Bloch's father had at one stage intended to become a rabbi, and the young Ernest had a strong religious upbringing; as an adult he felt that to write music that expressed his Jewish identity was "the only way in which I can produce music of vitality and significance". Perhaps what is at the heart of the question is his genius for evocative color in music. If some of his works evoke the atmosphere of the Old Testament, they also operate elsewhere with equally telling and totally different effect; the Gauguinesque South Seas in the slow movement of the first Quintet, and China [in the last of the] Four Episodes are examples. Beside Israel stand Helvetia and America; beside Scenes from Jewish Life stands Nirvana."

Yet there are many other sources of inspiration, such as the neo-classical influences evident in the Concerto Grosso No. 1. His music uses a variety of contemporary harmonic devices. Some are enumerated in Vincent Persichetti's book Twentieth Century Harmony. According to Persichetti, these include the use of the Dorian mode and of harmony with extensive alterations in the first Concerto Grosso, tone clusters in his Piano Sonata, the percussive use of harmony, as well as serial harmony, in his Piano Quintet No. 1.

== Family ==
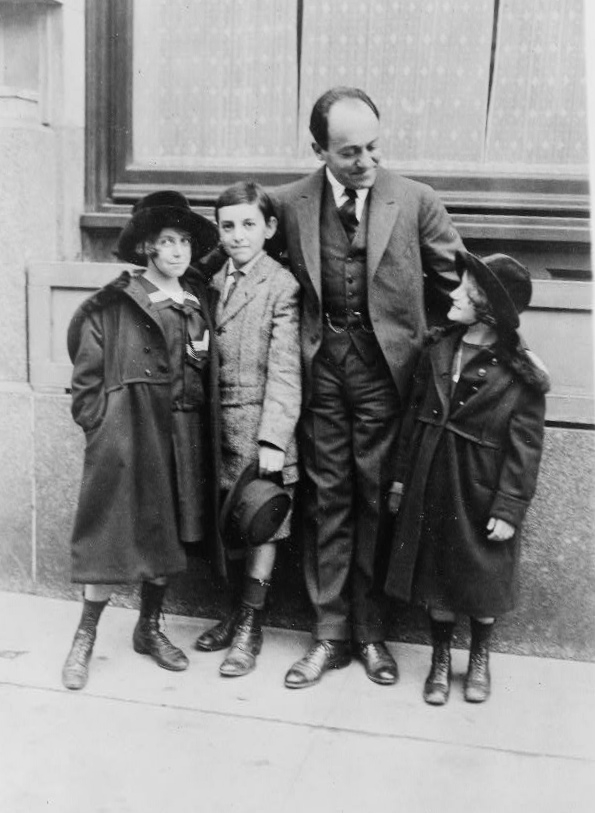
Ernest Bloch with his children Suzanne, Ivan and Lucienne

Ernest Bloch and his wife Marguerite Schneider had three children: Ivan, Suzanne and Lucienne.

Ivan, born in 1905, became an engineer with the Bonneville Power Administration in Portland, Oregon.

Suzanne Bloch, born in 1907, was a musician particularly interested in Renaissance music who taught harpsichord, lute and composition at the Juilliard School in New York.

Lucienne Bloch, born in 1909, worked as Diego Rivera's chief photographer on the Rockefeller Center mural project, became friends with Rivera's wife, the artist Frida Kahlo, and took some key photos of Kahlo and the only photographs of Rivera's mural (which was destroyed because Lenin was depicted in it).

== Photography ==
The Western Jewish History Center, of the Judah L. Magnes Museum, in Berkeley, California, has a small collection of photographs taken by Ernest Bloch which document his interest in photography.

Bloch's photography was discovered by Eric B. Johnson in 1970. With the encouragement of Bloch's children, Johnson edited and printed hundreds of his photographs.

Many of the photographs Bloch took—over 6,000 negatives and 2,000 prints, many printed by Eric Johnson from the original negatives—are in the Ernest Bloch Archive at the Center for Creative Photography at the University of Arizona in Tucson along with photographs by the likes of Ansel Adams, Edward Weston and Richard Avedon.

Some of the pictures that Bloch took in his Swiss residence are visible online. The snapshots have been donated to the Archivio audiovisivo di Capriasca e Val Colla by the Associazione ricerche musicali nella Svizzera italiana.

== Legacy ==
- Ernest Bloch House
- U.S. National Register of Historic Places
- Nearest city: Agate Beach, Oregon
- NRHP reference No.: 09000049
- Added to NRHP: February 9, 2009

Ernest Bloch's home in Agate Beach was listed on the National Register of Historic Places on February 9, 2009. The Bloch Memorial, which was dedicated by Oregon Governor Bob Straub with Ernest Bloch's three children at his side on April 10, 1976, was moved from near his house in Agate Beach to a more prominent location in front of the Newport Performing Arts Center in nearby Newport, Oregon. In 2009, the City of Newport City Council designated the intersection of NW 49th Street, Woody Way and Gilbert Way as Ernest Bloch Place. In 2016, the Oregon Department of Transportation Board of Commissioners officially designated the Ernest Bloch Memorial Wayside in the area of Agate Beach where the original Ernest Bloch Memorial was dedicated in 1976. The Ernest Bloch Memorial Wayside, the 1976 monument and a new Monument were formally dedicated in 2018. The informal Ernest Bloch Legacy Project was created by Dr. Frank Jo Maitland Geltner in 2003. The Ernest Bloch Legacy Project affiliated with the Lincoln County Historical Society in 2021.

Bloch's music manuscripts, correspondence, and other papers are held by the Library of Congress in Washington, D.C., where they are open for research.

The composer Robert Strassburg compiled extensive research materials on the career of Ernest Bloch which have been archived for the benefit of researchers at the University of Florida, Gainesville.
