= Allégresse =

Allégresse is a French word for happiness

== Music ==
=== Classical ===
- Allégresse in C major Piano music of Gabriel Fauré
- Allégresse and Rondo List of compositions by Carl Czerny
- Allégresse and Barcarolle Mendelssohn
- "Allégresse", composition for cello and piano by André Caplet (1903)
- "L'allégresse", composition for organ by Charles Piroye
- "Allégresse", composition for violin and piano Jean Gabriel-Marie (1894)
- "Allégresse", composition by Saint-Preux
- "Allégresse", composition by Jean-Jacques Grunenwald

=== Jazz ===
- Allégresse (album) Maria Schneider 2000
- "Allégresse", song by Maria Schneider composed by Maria Schneider from Allégresse (album)
- "Allégresse", by fr:Marc-André Pépin composed by Marc-André Pépin
- "Allégresse", tune for accordion played by Charles Péguri composed by Roger Vaysse
