= List of compositions by Carl Czerny =

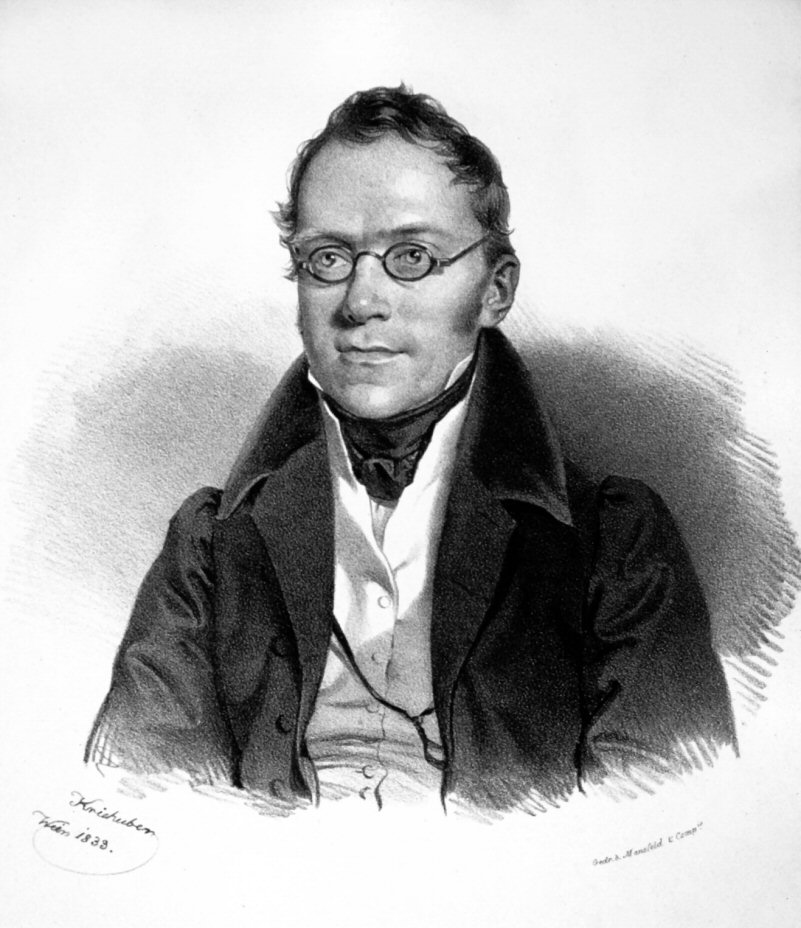
Carl Czerny

This is a list of compositions by Carl Czerny.

Czerny composed a large number of pieces (up to Op. 861), including piano music (études, nocturnes, 11 sonatas, opera theme arrangements and variations) and also masses and choral music, 6 symphonies, concertos, songs, string quartets and other chamber music. Czerny himself divided his music into four categories:

1. studies and exercises
2. easy pieces for students
3. brilliant pieces for concerts
4. serious music.

== By opus number ==
- Op. 1, Variations Concertantes pour Pianoforte et Violon sur un thème de Jean-Baptiste Krumpholz
- Op. 2, Brilliant Rondeau on Cavatine de Carafa à quatre mains
- Op. 3, Brilliant Fantasy and Variations on "Romance of Blangini" with Accompanied two Violins, Alto, and Violoncello (Double Bass ad lib.)
- Op. 4, Le Souvenir, Variations
- Op. 5, Grand Rondeau n° 1, en ut majeur
- Op. 6, Waltz or Exercises
- Op. 7, Sonata No. 1 in A♭ (published by Artaria) (1810),
- Op. 8, Amicitiae, Andantino con Variazione
- Op. 9, Brilliant Variations and easy (Theme favorite)
- Op. 10, Brilliant Grand Sonata in C minor, for four hands
- Op. 11, Brilliant Divertissement, for four hands
- Op. 12, Variations (Trauer-Walzer D. 365 No . 2 by F. Schubert) Solo and Duet
- Op. 13, Sonata No. 2 in A minor (published by Diabelli)
- Op. 14, Brilliant Variations on an Austrian Waltz
- Op. 15, Recreation for the Carnival, Brilliant Choice of Waltz and easy; two books
- Op. 16, Introduction and Variations on "O cara memoria," with Vcello. Acct. ad lib.
- Op. 17, Brilliant Rondo on a favorite Menuet of C. Kreutzer, for piano six hands
- Op. 18, Brilliant Grande Polonaise with an accompaniment for a second Pianoforte, or for a Quartett, both ad lib.
- Op. 19, Variations of a Barcarole favorite
- Op. 20, Introduction and Variations on a Marche favorite della Donna del Lago
- Op. 21, Introductions and Variations on a Cav.(Cavatine?) Favorite "Sorte secondami"
- Op. 22, Rondino No. 1 on "Cara attendimi," with Quartett Accompaniments ad lib.
- Op. 23, Brilliant Rondo No. 2, for 4 hands, in G
- Op. 24, Presto caratteristico, Duet in A minor
- Op. 25, Brilliant Variations on "Ah come nancondere" for 4 hands
- Op. 26, Rondo quasi Capriccio, in E♭
- Op. 27, Fantasy in B♭
- Op. 28, Grand Concerto for piano in F, with Orchestral accompaniments
- Op. 29, Rondino No. 2 on a Theme de l'Opera Corradino
- Op. 30, Rondino No. 3 on a Theme de l'Opera Armida
- Op. 31, 3 Fugues
  1. Fugue in F
  2. Fugue in E♭ minor
  3. Fugue in C
- Op. 32, New Year's gifts, 24 Waltzes
- Op. 33, La Ricordanza, Variazioni sopra un Tema di Rode
- Op. 34, Duet for the Pianoforte for 4 hands, according to the first Trio of Mayseder
- Op. 35, Waltz di Bravura
- Op. 36, Impromptus on Brilliant Variations on Cotillon de Ballet Arsena
- Op. 37, Fantasy followed by a Romance varied
- Op. 38, First Grand Potpourri Concerto for two Pianoforte for 6 hands
- Op. 39, Rondino No. 4 on a Theme by Fesca
- Op. 40, Brilliant Variations on Ballet La Danseuse d'Arthere, for 4 hands
- Op. 41, Rondino No. 5 on a Theme by Beethoven
- Op. 42, Rondino No. 6 on an original Theme, Rondino No. 6, 'Les Jours Passées' on an original theme in E♭
- Op. 43, Brilliant Divertissement No. 2 on a Cav. "Aure felice," for 4 hands
- Op. 44, Romance of Beethoven arranged as a Brilliant Rondo, for 4 hands
- Op. 45, Charms of Baden, Rondo Pastoral
- Op. 46, Variations on a Bohemian Air
- Op. 47, Grand Exercise in bravura in the form of Brilliant Rondo
- Op. 48, "Die Schiffende," Song with Pianoforte, accompanied words by Holtz
- Op. 49, Two Brilliant Sonatinas
  1. Sonatina in C
  2. Sonatina in F
- Op. 50, Two Brilliant Sonatinas for 4 hands
  1. Sonatina in G
  2. Sonatina in C
- Op. 51, Two Brilliant Sonatinas, for Pianoforte and Violin
  1. Sonatina in B♭
  2. Sonatina in G
- Op. 52, Variations in an easy style on the Air from Die Fee aus Frankreich
- Op. 53, Rondoletto scherzando in C
- Op. 54, Brilliant and Characteristic Overture in B minor, for 4 hands,
- Op. 55, Charms of Friendship, Theme of Beethoven
- Op. 56, Introduction and Variations on the first Galoppe
- Op. 57, Grande Sonata No. 3, in F minor (published by Peters) (1824)
- Op. 58, Legerrazza e Bravura, Brilliant Rondo, with Quartett accompaniment
- Op. 59, Introduction and Brilliant Variations on a Rondo and Marche favorite of Roland
- Op. 60, Introduction, Variations and Rondo on C. M. von Weber's Hunting Chorus from the opera Euryanthe, with Orchestral Accompaniments (Wien : S.A. Steiner, 1824)
- Op. 61, Preludes, Cadences, and a short Fantasia in a brilliant style
- Op. 62, Caprice and Variations on "An Alexis" by Himmel
- Op. 63, Brilliant and easy Toccatine on Tarrantelle of the Ballet Die Fee und der Ritter
- Op. 64, Fantasy in the modern style on Potpourri
- Op. 65, Sonata No. 4 in G (published by Kistner)
- Op. 66, Rondo and Waltz in C
- Op. 67, Concert Variations followed by a Hunting Rondo on the walk of the Ballet, Barbe Bleu, for 4 hands
- Op. 68, Passionate Rondo
- Op. 69, Allegretto grazioso sopra un Tema de Ballo, Barbe Bleu
- Op. 70, Romance for Pianoforte, in D
- Op. 71, Brilliant Nocturne for "Das waren mir selige Tage," for 4 hands
- Op. 72, 2 Nice Rondos
  1. Nice Rondo in C
  2. Nice Rondo in G
- Op. 73, Variations on "Gott erhalte Franz den Kaiser", for piano with quartet or orchestral accompaniments (1824)
- Op. 74, Brilliant Rondoletto in E♭
- Op. 75, 3 Grand Allegros
  1. Grand Allegro in G
  2. Grand Allegro in B minor
  3. Grand Allegro in A♭
- Op. 76, Sonata No. 5 in E (published by Diabelli)

I. Allegro molto moderato ed espressivo
II. Andante cantabile (B major)
III. Scherzo Presto
IV. Andantino con variazioni (5 Variations and coda)
V. Finale Toccatina (Allo. moderato)

- Op. 77, "God save the King," with Variations
- Op. 78, Concerto for Fortepiano and Orchestra, in C
- Op. 79, 3 Grand Marches, solo and duet
  1. Grand Marche in C
  2. Grand Marche in D
  3. Grand Marche in E♭
- Op. 80, Introduction and 7 Variations, Concerto for Pianoforte, and Flute (or Violin)
- Op. 81, Variations on Marche Anglais
- Op. 82, Grand Exercise for Pianoforte, in F minor
- Op. 83, Romance from W. Scott's "Fraulein vorn See" for a Voice with Pianoforte accompaniment
- Op. 84, Grand Potpourri No. 2 for 6 hands
- Op. 85, 3 Polonaises
- Op. 86, Introduction, Variationen und Finale über den beliebten Baierischen Volksgesang
- Op. 87, Introduction et variations faciles pour le pianoforte à quatre mains sur un walse de Mr. le Comte de Gallenberg (Leipzig : H.A. Probst, 1825)
- Op. 88, Septième rondino pour le piano-forte : sur un motif de l'opéra Elisa e Claudio de Mercadante (Hannover, C. Bachmann, 1825)
- Op. 89, Capriccio à la fuga per il pianoforte
- Op. 90, Six rondeaux mignons: pour le piano-forte à quatre mains, à l'usage des elèves avancés (Hannover, C. Bachmann, 1826)
- Op. 91, Variations sur l'air allemand "Es ritten drei Reiter zum Thore hinaus, Ade"
- Op. 92, Toccata ou exercice pour la pianoforte in C major
- Op. 93, Rondo espressivo in E major
- Op. 94, 2 Grand Marches for Piano 4-Hands
- Op. 95, Notturno brillant (in E♭ major, for piano, violin, viola, violoncello, flute, clarinet, horn, bassoon, and double bass)
- Op. 96, Rondino No.8 on an Original Theme (alla Polacca)
- Op. 97, Neuvième rondino (de Chasse)
- Op. 98, Dixième rondino sur un motif de W. A. Mozart pour le piano-forte
- Op. 99, Rondino No.11 on a Theme of Haydn
- Op. 100, Douzième rondino (militaire) pour le piano-forte seul; sur un motif de L. Cherubini
- Op. 101, Grand march for four hands at one piano, composed for the Coronation of the Empress Caroline of Austria (Published by J. Balls of London around 1826)
- Op. 102, Rondeau brillante No.3 for Piano 4-Hands (Steiner) - Reviewed in AMZ 1826/544
- Op. 103, Variations brillante sur un Air militaire française
- Op. 104, Trois Sonatines faciles et brillantes pour le pianoforte seul ou avec accomp: d'un violon et violoncelle ad libitum
- Op. 105, Trio no. 1 in E♭ for piano, violin, and horn (or cello)
- Op. 106, Introduction & Variations on an Original Theme for Piano 4-Hands
- Op. 107, Rondeau Brillante dans le Style Francaise in D minor
- Op. 108, Caprice in E minor
- Op. 109, 5 Unvergangliche Blumchen for Voice & Piano
- Op. 110, Décaméron musical - Not the same with opp. 111
- Op. 111, Zwei Romanzen für Klavier zu drei Händen (part of a larger Decameron Musicale?)
- Op. 112, Galoppe varié No.2
- Op. 113, Variations on an Original Theme
- Op. 114, Valse variée pour le piano-forte
- Op. 115, Easy Variations on a Theme from the Farce, Staberl's Reise Abentheuer in Frankfort and Munchen
- Op. 116, Rondeau brillant for piano four hands
- Op. 117, 3 Rondeaux: Tendress, Amitie, & Confiance
- Op. 118, Grande polonaise brillante pour le piano-forte (with string quartet ad libitum, according to Chez Richault edition at U. Michigan libraries.)
- Op. 119, Sonate militaire et brillante pour le pianoforte à 4 mains avec accompagnement de violon et violoncelle ad libitum, composée à l'usage des élèves avancés. (1826)
- Op. 120, Sonate sentimentale pour le pianoforte à quatre mains (1826)
- Op. 121, Sonate pastorale (Also for piano four-hands, 1826)
- Op. 122, Grand Divertissement en forme de rondeau brillant with Orchestral Accompaniment
- Op. 123, Variations brillantes sur un thême Allemand favori
- Op. 124, Sonate für das Pianoforte. (No. 6 in D minor.) (Zurich: Nägeli, 1840s)

I. Introduzione
II. Capriccio appassionato
III. (no title, but All. con moto, vivace ma serioso)
IV. (Presto, scherzo)
V. Cantique de la Bohême; Varié
VI. (Presto scherzando)
VII. Finale: Allegro con fuoco

- Op. 125, Variations brillantes on a Theme from the Opera 'Il Crociato' for Piano 4-Hands
- Op. 126, Grande serenade concertante for clarinet, horn, violoncello, and piano.
- Op. 127, Rondino sur un thême favori de l'opera Le maçon d'Auber. For piano quintet. (Vienna, Diabelli & Co.)
- Op. 128, Rondeau brillante in A major
- Op. 129, Duo concertant : in G-Dur, für Flöte oder Violoncello und Klavier
- Op. 130, Variations brillantes on 2 Themes from the Opera 'L'Ultimo Giorno di Pompei' for Piano 4-Hands
- Op. 131, Fantaisie élégante ou Potpourri brillant sur les thèmes favoris de lópéra: La dame blanche : comp. pour le pianoforte
- Op. 132, Variations brillantes sur le Duo favori "Dépéchons, travaillons = Ohne Rast, angefasst" de l'Opéra: Le Maçon (Der Maurer und der Schlosser) [de Daniel François Esprit Auber] pour le Piano-Forte à 4 mains
- Op. 133, Introduction & Variations on the Cavatine from the Opera 'L'Ultimo Giorno di Pompei'
- Op. 134, Impromptu or Variations on a Theme from 'Oberon'
- Op. 135, Variations on a Theme from the Opera 'Oberon' (Artaria)
- Op. 136, Sonatinas for piano four hands
- Op. 137, Allegro affetuoso for piano four hands (British Library) (pub. CF Peters around 1827.)
- Op. 138, Variations de Concert sur la Marche des Grecs de l'Opéra : le Siège de Corinthe
- Op. 139, Études (Übungstücke, or 100 Progressive Studies)
- Op. 140, Introductions & Variations on a Favorite Air from 'Das Madchen aus der Feenwelt'
- Op. 141, Variations on the Favorite Duet "Bruderlein Fein" for Piano 4-Hands
- Op. 142, Ouverture, orkest, nr.1, op.142. In C minor
- Op. 143, Seventh Piano Sonata in E minor (published by Kistner of Leipzig)
- Op. 144, Grande fantaisie en forme de sonate, sonata no. 8 in E♭, for piano
- Op. 145, Grande fantaisie en forme de sonate, sonata no. 9 in B minor (Richault, 1827)
- Op. 146, Marcia funèbre sulla morte di Luigi van Beethoven per il piano-forte solo
- Op. 147, Variations à capriccio on 2 Themes from the Opera 'Oberon' for Piano 4-Hands
- Op. 148, First piano quartet (Premier grand quatuor pour le piano-forte, violon, viola et violoncelle, Peters of Leipzig, pub. 1827)
- Op. 149, Rondoletto concertant: in F-dur für Pianoforte, Flöte und Violoncello ad lib
- Op. 150, Trois polonaises sentimentales
- Op. 151, Grand Exercice de trilles en forme de rondeau brillant
- Op. 152, Grand exercice (pub. by Ant. diabelli u.C. of Vienna)
- Op. 153, Concerto for piano four-hands and orchestra in C major
- Op. 154, Graduale Pastorale in F major, "Hodie Christus Natus Est", for 4 Voices, 2 Violins, Viola, 2 Clarinets, 2 Horns, Cello, Double Bass, & Organ
- Op. 155, Exsulta filia Sion : Offertorium pastorale : für vierstimmigen gemischten Chor, Streicher, 2 Oboen oder Klarinetten, 2 Trompeten, Pauken und Orgel, 2 Hörner ad lib.
- Op. 156, Belohnung der fleissigen Jugend : drei Sonatinen für's Piano-Forte
- Op. 157, Fantasia in A major, Der Brand von Maria-Zell
- Op. 158, Three sonatines for four-hands
- Op. 159, Rondeau brillant di bravura pour le piano-forte seul
- Op. 160, Introduction, variations and polacca after a theme from Bellini's "Il Pirata" for piano and orchestra (Published by Diabelli in Vienna around 1831)
- Op. 161, 48 Etudes in the Form of Preludes
- Op. 162, Fantaisie sur themes suisses et tiroliens
- Op. 163, Six sonatinas, piano
- Op. 164, Rondino No.14 sur "Ma Quell Amabile" (de l'opéra 'Il Pirata') (pub.1828, Richault)
- Op. 165, Grand Nocturne Brillant for Piano 4-Hands, with 2 horns ad lib
- Op. 166, Trio no. 2 in A for piano and strings (pub. about 1830)

I. Allegro; Scherzo: Molto Allegro
II. Trio (umoristico); Adagio sostenuto in D
III. attacca All^{o} agitato in A minor
IV. attacca
V. Allegretto piacevole in A major

- Op. 167, Sonatina for piano
- Op. 168, 2 Rondeaux
- Op. 169, Rondino No.15 on a Theme of Paganini
- Op. 170, Grandes variations brillantes pour le pianoforte à quatre mains sur le thême original favori colla campanella (Glöckchen Rondo) comp. et dediées à l'auteur du thême M.r N. Paganini
- Op. 171, Fantasy on 3 Themes by Haydn, Mozart & Beethoven for Timpani and Strings
- Op. 172, Gran Capriccio, in C minor
- Op. 173, Trio no. 3 in E (Troisième Grand Trio) for piano and strings (published by 1829)
- Op. 174, 14 Ecossaises brillantes
- Op. 175, Fantaisie-Rondo d'après l'Adelaide de Beethoven : pour le piano forte/Musical Décameron (Piano Solo version)
- Op. 176, Second Musical Décameron (Piano Duet version)
- Op. 177, Two fugues for string quintet
- Op. 178, Grande sonate in F minor for piano 4-hands,
- Op. 179, Introduction, Variations, & Polacca on 2 Favorite Airs from "Der Alpen Konig und der Menschenfried"
- Op. 180, Introduction & Variations on a Favorite Air from "Der Alpen Konig und der Menschenfried" (Solo & Duet Versions)
- Opus Numbers 181-192 are collectively entitled "12 Grand Rondeaux Nationaux Brillants et Caracteristiques"

Op. 181, Rondeau national allemand
Op. 182, Rondeau national anglois et eccossois
Op. 183, Rondeau national bohéme
Op. 184, Rondeau national espagnol
Op. 185, Rondeau national francais
Op. 186, Rondeau Hongrois
Op. 187, Rondeau Italien
Op. 188, Rondeau Polonois
Op. 189, Rondeau Russe
Op. 190, Rondeau Suedois
Op. 191, Rondeau Suisse
Op. 192, Rondeau Turque

- Op. 193, Troisième galoppe variée pour le piano-forte
- Op. 194, Introduction, Variations, & Rondo on 2 Favorite Styrian Alpine Airs (Solo & Duet Versions)
- Op. 195, Rondino No.16 sur 'Ah come rapida'
- Op. 196, Introduction, variations et rondo sur la cavatine (Or che son vicino a te) de Nicolini, pour le piano-forte avec accompagnement de deux violons, alto et violoncelle
- Op. 197, Variations brillantes pour un pianoforte à 6 manis concertantes (on a theme from Bellini's opera Norma)
- Op. 198, Rondino No.17 sur 'La Muette de Portici'
- Op. 199, Variations sur "Ach! ich Stell" du Falsche Dir (Solo & Duet Versions)
- Op. 200, A systematic introduction to improvisation on the pianoforte
- Op. 201, 6 Rondeaux d'amusement
- Op. 202, Introduction, variations brillantes et rondeau de chasse
- Op. 203, Valse Autrichienne
- Op. 204, Divertissement de concert, piano, orchestra (or: Divertissement de concert; ou, Adagio, variations et rondeau, pour le piano-forte avec accompagnement d'orchestre)
- Op. 205, Rondeau précedé d'une introduction comp. pour le pianoforte
- Op. 206, Theme Russe, variée
- Op. 207, Rondoletto sur le Theme Hollandis Favori, "Wien Neelands Bloed in de Aders Vloeit"
- Op. 208, Introduction et variations sur 'La muette de Portici'
- Op. 209, Divertissement
- Op. 210, Concertino for piano (and strings, flute, 2 oboes or clarinets, 2 bassoons, 2 horns, 2 trumpets and drums (ad libitum).) (Published by Haslinger of Vienna in the 1850s)
- Op. 211, Deux Trios brillants pour pianoforte, violon et violoncelle (publ. Diabelli, Vienna, about 1835)
- Op. 212, Six Grand Potpourris for piano trio
- Op. 213, Andante und rondo in C for orchestra (?) (published by Haslinger about 1833)
- Op. 214, Piano Concerto in A minor
- Op. 215, Rondoletto Brillant sur Plusiers Motifs tires des Romances Francais
- Op. 216, Rondoletto Brillant on 2 Motifs from the Opera 'William Tell'
- Op. 217, Rondeau de chasse on "Quelle Savage Harmonie" from 'William Tell'
- Op. 218, Potpourri brilliant on Themes from Spohr's Faust
- Op. 219, Introduction et variations sur le 'Pas de trois favori'
- Op. 220, Brilliant variations for the piano forte on the favorite tyrolienne in Rossini's celebrated opera Guillaume Tell (published in London: Goulding & D'almaine, [entre 1825 et 1832])
- Op. 221, 2 Grandes fantaisies sur les motifs de 'Guillaume Tell'
  1. in E minor
  2. in A major
- Op. 222, Impromptu brillant en [sic] non difficile pour le piano forte sur un pastorale de l'opéra Guillaume Tell
- Op. 222a, Variations in A major - version for piano and orchestra
- Op. 223, Variations Brillantes on "Das Wandern ist des Müllers Lust" by Schubert (Solo & Duet Versions)
- Op. 224, Deux Quatuors Brilliants (for piano quartet) (Deux quatuore brillans pour piano-forte, violon, alte et violoncelle)
- Op. 225, Variations Brillantes on a Romance from Ivanhoe's Opera 'Templar & Judinn' for Piano 4-Hands
- Op. 226, Fantaisie in F minor for piano duet : Allegro con spiritoso; Andantino; Scherzo; Presto; Allegro: Tempo I
- Opus Numbers 227-229 & 295-297 are part of the Collection "Les Pianistes Associes, ou Compositions Brillant et Concertant"

Op. 227, Rondeau brillant op. 227 : für Klavier zu 6 Händen
Op. 228, Variations Brillante on a Tyrolien Theme from the Opera 'La Fiancee' for Piano 6-Hands
Op. 229, Divertissement militaire : für Klavier zu 6 Händen

- Op. 230, Quartet for four pianos in C (Quatuor concertant für vier Piano-Forte über mehrere beliebte Melodien. Diabelli, Vienna, 1830) (In one movement in several connected sections)
- Op. 230a, Morceau de concert très brillant sur des motif (sic) favoris pour le piano (pub.1831, Richault)
- Op. 231, Rondeaux mignons faciles et brillants sur divers motifs favoris : pour le piano
- Op. 232, Grandes variations di bravura sur deux motifs de l'Opéra 'Fra Diavolo' de D.F.E. Auber for piano and orchestra
- Op. 233, Rondo brillant in B♭ major
- Op. 234, Introduction & Variations Brillantes sur la Marche dans "Gli Arabi nelle Gallie" for piano and orchestra
- Op. 235, Rondino No.18 on a Theme of Auber
- Op. 236, Introduction, grandes variations et finale sur une marone française
- Op. 237, Einzugs Marsch, Performed at the Opening of the Hungarian Diet, 13 Sept. 1830 (Solo & Duet Versions)
- Op. 238, March Performed on the Occasion of the Coronation of His Imperial Majesty Ferdinand as King of Hungary, 28 Sept. 1830 (Solo & Duet Versions)
- Op. 239, 50 Vierhändige Übungsstücke
- Op. 240, Fantasy Romantique No.1 on Sir Walter Scott's 'Roman Waverley' for Piano 4-Hands
- Op. 241, Fantasy Romantique No.2 on Sir Walter Scott's 'Guy Mannering' for Piano 4-Hands
- Op. 242, Fantasy Romantique No.3 on Sir Walter Scott's 'Ivanhoe' for Piano 4-Hands
- Op. 243, Fantasy Romantique No.4 on Sir Walter Scott's 'Rob Roy' for Piano 4-Hands
- Op. 244, Grand Exercice de la Gamme Chromatique avec toutes les Differentes Maruieres du Doigte
- Op. 245, Grand exercice Grand Exercice des Gammes en Tierces & des Passages Doubles
- Op. 246, Introduction, Variations, & Finale on a Choeur de l'Opera 'Fra Diavolo'
- Op. 247, Fantaisie sur les motifs favoris de l'opera I Puritani
- Op. 248, Introduction et variations concertantes sur un air tirolienne for horn or cello and piano
- Op. 249, Variations sur la valse Charmante : de Jean Strauss, le duc de Reichstadt varié pour le piano forte
- Op. 250, Festal March in A major
- Op. 251, Sonatine in G
- Op. 252, 3rd Decameron Musical, 10 Bks. for Piano 4-Hands
- Op. 253, Le Golfe de Naples, Tableau Nocturne ou Fanasie Pittoresque
- Op. 254, Grand rondeau brillant pour le pianoforte à 4 mains
- Op. 255, Rondeau a la Barcarolle in A major
- Op. 256, Fantasia concertante, für Klavier, Flöte und Violoncello in G major
- Op. 257, Grand polonaise in C major
- Op. 258, Deux thêmes originaux variés pour le pianoforte (Halle [ca. 1835])
- Op. 259, Grand rondeau militaire et brillant. For piano four-hands. (H. Helmuth in Halle, around 1833?)
- Op. 260, Rondo in F major
- Op. 261, 125 exercises. (Passagen-Übungen, piano. Pub. by Haslinger in four Volumes 1832 - 1838.)
- Op. 262, Three piano quartets. (Trois quatuors brillans et non difficiles pour le pianoforte, violon, alto et violoncello. Hoffmeister of Leipzig, about 1832)
- Op. 263, Variations precédés d'une introduction sur 'La fiancée'
- Op. 264, Introduzione ed allegro agitato in G minor for Piano Duet
- Op. 265, Rondeau précédé d'une introduction
- Op. 266, Variations Brillantes & non difficiles on an Original Valse for Piano 4-Hands
- Op. 267, Allegro en galopp in F major
- Op. 268, Piano sonata no. 10 Grande sonate d'étude in B♭
- Op. 269, Grande Polonaise Brillante for Piano 4-Hands
- Op. 270, 3 Thèmes originaux, variés
- Op. 271, La Joyeust et la Sentimentale, 2 Rondos
- Op. 272, Rondo Polacca
- Op. 273, Impromptu sur un thème favori de Paganini
- Op. 274, Souvenir de Contemporains, 3 Rondeaux Brillante & Facile sur des Motifs Favoris de Notre Tems (Solo & Duet Versions)
- Op. 275, 3 Thèmes choisis de 'Robert le Diable'
- Op. 276, Sérénade vénitienne, Divertissement Concertant on a Barcarolle for 3 Voices - Accompanied by Variations brillantes For Piano, Flute, Clarinet, & Cello in A major
- Op. 277, Le Chiron Musical (or Collection des Compositions Instructives) for Piano 4-Hands
- Op. 278, Rondo en Bolero in D major
- Op. 279, Rondino No.19 on 2 Favorite Motifs from the Opera 'Zampa'
- Op. 280, Grandes variations brillantes, sur une marche anglaise : pour le pianoforte avec accompagnement d'orchestre ou de quatuor, (ad libitum) (Pub. by Artaria in Vienna around 1832)
- Op. 281, Introduction, variations et presto finale sur 'Norma' in F major for piano and orchestra or string quartet ad libitum
- Op. 282, Le Cornet de Postillon, Variations on a Theme of Rossini
- Op. 283, Grand rondeau brillant for piano and orchestra in F major
- Op. 284, Rondino No.20 on Schubert's "Das Ständchen" in C major
- Op. 285, Variations sur un theme de 'Montecchi e Capuleti' in B♭ Major (2 Piano & Piano Solo Versions)
- Op. 286, Grand Rondo Brillante in C major
- Op. 287, 3 Ariette Italienne for Tenor Voice & Piano
- Op. 288, 6 Divertissements en forme de Rondeaux
- Op. 289, Piano trio no. 4 in A minor (Published by Simrock in 1834)
- Op. 290, La Douceur, Rondo Elegant
- Op. 291, Grand Rondo for Piano 4-Hands
- Op. 292, Variations brillantes sur un thême original in F Major
- Op. 293, La Rivalité for Piano 4-Hands
- Op. 294, Grand Potpourri in A Major for Piano, Flute, Violin, Alto, & Cello
- Opus Numbers 227-229 & 295-297 are part of the Collection "Les Pianistes Associes, ou Compositions Brillant et Concertant"

Op. 295, Grand Trio No. 4 Air from I Montechi e Capuletti with Variations for one piano, 6 hands.
Op. 296, Polonaise brillante for Piano 6-Hands
Op. 297, Variations brillantes sur un thème de la Norma de Bellini for Piano 6 Hands

- Op. 298, Grand Potpourri No.3 for 2 Pianos, 6-Hands
- Op. 299, School of Velocity (Die Schule der Geläufigkeit)
- Op. 300, The Art of Preluding in 120 Examples (Part 2 of Introduction to Extemporaneous Performance Op. 200)
- Op. 301, Variations sur une valse de Reissiger (La Dernière Pensée de Weber)
- Op. 302, Thême italien varié
- Op. 303, Introduction et Variations brillantes sur un thème de Vivenot
- Op. 304, Variations pour le Pianoforte et Violon concertant sur Le vieux Tambour de Lafont
- Op. 305, L'Espagnole
- Op. 306, Souvenirs du jeune âge
- Op. 307, Variations Brillantes on a Theme from the Opera 'Le Serment' for Piano 4-Hands
- Op. 308, Variations on an Original Theme
- Op. 309, Introduction & Variations in G major on a Theme from 'Le Pre aux Clercs' for Piano, Violin, & Cello (Herold)
- Op. 310, Variations Brillantes on "Dans Cette Belle" from the Opera 'Le Serment'
- Op. 311, 2 Rondeaux on Themes from 'Le Pré aux Clercs'
- Op. 312, Variations on "A la Fleur du Bel Age" from the Opera 'Le Pre aux Clercs' for Piano 4-Hands (Herold)
- Op. 313, The Young Pianist, 2 Sonatines Faciles (C major, & G major)
- Op. 314, Grande polonaise brillante précédée d'une introduction pour le pianoforte et violon concertant. (Simrock, Bonn, 1840s),
- Op. 315, 3 cadenzas to Beethoven's Piano Concerto n.1 in C major
- Op. 316, Dix petits rondeaux doigtés pour le piano; ou, amusemens utiles et agréables sur des motifs favoris, pour la jeunesse (Published 1830s)
- Op. 317, Introduction, thème et variations pour piano sur un thème original (pub. by Schuberth of Leipzig in the 1830s)
- Op. 318, 6 graduals, for SATB and organ
- Op. 319, Variations sur la Valse de Robert le diable
- Op. 320, Variations
- Op. 321, Rondo brillant for four-hand piano
- Op. 322, Rondo in B♭ Major for Piano Solo
- Op. 323, l'Allégresse, Rondo for the piano. (published by Schuberth of Leipzig around 1850.)
- Op. 324, Variations Brillantes on a Waltz of Lanner
- Op. 325, Tre fantasie eleganti : dall'Elisir d'amore di Donizetti
- Op. 326, Trois thèmes favoris de l'opéra Zampa de Hérold : variés pour le piano forte
- Op. 327, 3 Fantasies on Donizetti's Opera 'Parisina' (Solo & Duet Versions)
- Op. 328, 3 Fantasies on 'Il Furioso all' Isola di St. Domingo' Solo & Duet Versions
- Op. 329, Variations on a Theme from De Marschner's Opera 'Hans Heiling' for Piano 4-Hands
- Op. 330, Tausend Tonblumen
- Op. 331, Grande Sonate No.3 in B♭ major for Piano 4-Hands
- Op. 332, Variations brillantes sur 'Robert le diable'
- Op. 333, Les Elegantes (3 Bks.)

Bk. 1 - Sur la Tyrolienne Favorite, Almalied
Bk. 2 - Sur la Sonnambula
Bk. 3 - Sur un Valse Favorite

- Op. 334, Souvenir de Peste, Variations sur un Valse: Erinnerung an Pest de J. Strauss
- Op. 335, the School of Legato and Staccato (Die Schule des Legato und Staccato)
- Op. 336, Fantasie on Cherubini's Opera 'Ali Baba'
- Op. 337, Études quotidiennes (Tägliche Studien)
- Op. 338, Grandes variations de concert sur un thême original in D major
- Op. 339, Drey brillante Fantasien über die beliebtesten Motive aus Franz Schubert's Werken : für Pianoforte und Physharmonica, oder 2 Pianoforte (or horn and piano)
- Op. 340, Variations of J. Strauss's 'Pfennig Waltz'
- Op. 341, Variations brillantes sur un thème favori de l'opéra Hans Heiling de Henri Marschner
- Op. 342, 3 Fantasies on Bellini's Opera 'Beatrice di Tenda' (Solo & Duet Versions)
- Op. 343, 3 Thêmes Favoris de l'Opéra 'L'Estocq' variés
  1. in G major
  2. in F major
  3. in C major
- Op. 344, Trois rondinos non difficiles : sur des motifs favoris de l'opéra Lestocq d'Auber : pour le piano-forte
- Op. 345, Fantasia for piano in D minor (republished 1973)
- Op. 346, Fantasie on the Opera 'Lestocq'
- Op. 347, Variations on a Theme from 'Lestocq' in A major
- Op. 348, Grand exercice en forme de fantaisie improvisée in E minor
- Op. 349, Tre Sonatine for piano
- Op. 350, Le Dernier Soupir de Hérold, Variations on a Theme of Hérold
- Op. 351, Neujahrgeschenk Fantasie
- Op. 352, Souvenir de Boieldieu (Variations in B♭ Major)
- Op. 353, Variations Brillantes on 'Conversations Walzer'
- Op. 354, Amusement des Pianistes, Collection de Morceaux Agreables & Brillantes, 8 Bks.
- Op. 355, The School of Embellishments Ecole des Ornamens
- Op. 356, Variations brillantes sur un thème italien favori : pour le piano-forte, op. 356 = Vien quà Dorina bella = Komm, liebe holde Kleine
- Op. 357, Themes Italiens, Variations for Piano 4-Hands
- Op. 358, Duo Concertant in B♭ Major for 2 Pianos
- Op. 359, First Lessons for Beginners, 50 Exercises, Studies, & Preludes, 2 Bks.
  30. Marcia maestoso in D major (Vienna March)
- Op. 360, Grande Fantasie on the Opera 'Gustave'
- Op. 361, Introduction & Variations Brillantes on a Theme from the Opera 'La Medicine sans Medecin'
- Op. 362, Rondo brillante & non difficile on a Theme from the Opera 'La Medicine sans Medecin'
- Op. 363, Introduction & Variations on the Duo "Suoni la Tromba e Intrepido" from the Opera 'I Puritani'
- Op. 364, Grand exercice pour le pianoforté
- Op. 365, School of Virtuosos (Schule des Virtuosen)
- Op. 366, Variations Brillantes on a Theme from Lobe's Opera 'La Princesse de Grenade' in C Major
- Op. 367, Rondoletto Elegant on a Theme from Lobe's Opera 'La Princesse de Grenade'
- Op. 368, Nocturnes (8)
- Op. 369, Gran capriccio di bravura ossia studio per il piano-forte
- Op. 370, Variations brillantes on a Theme from the Opera 'I Puritani'
- Op. 371, 2 Rondolettos faciles on Themes from the Opera 'I Puritani' (D & C Major)
- Op. 372, Six galops en forme de rondeaux : sur des motifs favoris
- Op. 373, Ten brilliant rondos founded on favorite Italian airs; composed and arr. for 2 performers on the piano forte
- Op. 374, Trois Rondos faciles et brillants : pour flûte ou violon et piano (in C, D and G major)
- Op. 375, Introduction & Variations Brillantes on a Theme from the Opera 'I Puritani'
- Op. 376, Fantaisie et variations sur 'I puritani' for Piano 4-Hands
- Op. 377, Fantasy and Variations on Persiani's Ines de Castro
- Op. 378, Valse brillante in A♭ major
- Op. 379, Flore théâtrale (or Fantasies Brillantes) on Modern Operas
- Op. 380, Exercise of scales in thirds in all major and minor keys : for the pianoforte
- Op. 381, 3 Serenades on Themes of Rossini
- Op. 382, 2 Fantasies Brillantes on Themes from Carafa's Opera 'La Prison d'Edimburg'
- Op. 383, 3 Fantaisies on Themes from Donizetti's Opera 'Lucia di Lammermoor'
- Op. 384, Grandes Variations on an Air from the Opera 'Le Cheval de Bronze'
- Op. 385, Récréations de la jeunesse : douze rondeaux instructifs et agréables sur des thèmes modernes et favoris : pour le piano
- Op. 386, Souvenir de Bellini
- Op. 387, 3 Fantaisies on Themees from Donizetti's Opera 'Lucrezia Borgia'
- Op. 388, Etudes Preparatoires et Progressives
- Op. 389, Hommage aux Graces, 3 Rondeaux on Favorite Themes
- Op. 390, Three sonatinas for violin and piano. (Published by Diabelli in Vienna in 1838)
- Op. 391, Grande Rondeau-Polonaise in E♭ Major for Piano & Orchestra
- Op. 392, Der Abend und die Nacht
- Op. 393, 3 Fantaisies on Themes from Donizetti's Opera 'Marino Faliero'
- Op. 394, Fantasie & Variations on the l'Air National Russe 'Dieu Conserve l'Empereur'
- Op. 395, Fantasie & Variations on a Theme from the Opera 'Le Cheval de Bronze' for Piano 4-Hands
- Op. 396, Impromptu on a Theme from Halevy's Opera 'La Juive'
- Op. 397, Bijoux Teatrales (or Nouvelle Collection de Rondeaux, Variations, & Impromptus on Themes from New Operas) (comprises many books)
- Op. 398, Le Gout Moderne for Piano 4-Hands (comprises many books)
- Op. 399, Die Schule der linken Hand auf dem Piano-Forte, oder: 10 grosse Uebungen
- Op. 400, School of Fugue-Playing
- Op. 401, Divertissement sur les motifs les plus favoris de l'opéra La juive de Halévy
- Op. 402, Le petit artiste au salon musical : six morceaux faciles sur des thèmes favoris : pour le piano
- Op. 403, Romance & Rondo on Themes from the Opera 'Les Huguenots'
- Op. 404, Introduction et variations brillantes sur 'Les Huguenots'
- Op. 405, Grand Rondeau
- Op. 406, Festal March, on the Opening of the Booksellers' Exchange in Leipzig (Solo & Duet Versions) (published as Op.409)
- Op. 407, Scherzo Brillante on Themes from the Opera 'Les Huguenots'
- Op. 408, Andante Sentimental on Themes from the Opera 'Les Huguenots'
- Op. 409, Études spéciales: 50 grandi studi di perfezionamento per piano forte (pub. Milano : Gio. Canti; in the 1800s)
- Op. 410, Six sonatines faciles et doigtées : pour le piano-forte
- Op. 411, Introduction & Rondo
- Op. 412, 3 Rondos brillantes on Russian National Themes
- Op. 413, Souvenir de Mon Premier Voyage en Saxe, Fantasie Brillante
- Opus Numbers 414-416 comprise the collection "Album Musical"

Op. 414, Rondo élégant
Op. 415, Rondo militaire
Op. 416, Rondo gracieux

- Op. 417, Rondo Brillante on Themes from the Opera 'Les Huguenots'
- Op. 418, Impromptu in the Form of a Rondo on a Theme from the Opera 'Les Huguenots'
- Op. 419, Huit rondinos agréables et brillans sur des motifs les plus favoris. (Bonn, N. Simrock (1836?))
- Op. 420, Sixty lessons : arranged in an easy and progressive manner for the piano forte : to facilitate the progress of young scholars, with fingerings to each lesson. (New York: Firth & Hall (1830s?))
- Op. 421, Introduction & Rondo martial on a Theme from the Opera 'Les Huguenots'
- Op. 422, Introduction & Rondo brillante on a Theme from the Opera 'Les Huguenots' for Piano 4-Hands
- Op. 423, Rondoletto on a Theme from the Opera 'Les Huguenots'
- Op. 424, Caprice brillant sur motifs de 'Les Huguenots'
- Op. 425, Rondino scherzando on a Theme from the Opera 'Les Huguenots'
- Op. 426, Rondeau sentimental sur l'air favori Isle of beauty, fare thee well: pour le pianoforte
- Op. 427, Introduction & Variations brillantes on Themes of Reissiger
- Op. 428, L'Echo des Alpes Suisses Introduction & Variations brillantes on a Swiss Theme
- Op. 429, Impromptu brillant on a Swiss Theme
- Op. 430, Nachtwändler, Variations on a Waltz of Strauss
- Op. 431, Eisenbahn Variationen Variations on a Waltz by Strauss
- Op. 432, 24 Canzonette italiane(??) for Voice & Piano
- Op. 433, Études préparatoires et progressives pour le Piano pour servir au développement du mécanisme et de l'expression des Pianistes avancés
- Op. 434, Les quatre saisons
- Op. 435, Recreations Musicales, 6 Melodies of Bellini
- Op. 436, Rondoletto Scherzando
- Op. 437, Fantaisie on Themes from Donizetti's Opera ' La Campanello' (Solo & Duet Versions)
- Op. 438, Les progrès du jeune pianiste : huit thêmes favoris variés, composés pour le piano à l'usage des jeunes élèves avancés
- Op. 439, 4 Sonatinas for piano
- Op. 440, 4 Melodies Varies
- Op. 441, Fantaisie on Donizetti's Opera 'Betly' (Solo & Duet Versions)
- Op. 442, Introduction & Variations Brillantes on 'Choeur du Pirate'
- Op. 443, Variations Brillantes on a Theme from Halevy's Opera 'L'Eclair'
- Op. 444, Rondo Brillant on a Favorite Italian Theme
- Op. 445, Introduction & Variations on Themes from the Opera 'Beatice di Tenda'
- Op. 446, 3 Fantasies Brillantes on Themes of Mercadante
- Op. 447, Introduction & Variations Brillantes on the Cavatine "Senti tu Comeio Sento"
- Op. 448, Caprice et variations brillantes : sur le thème Versàr potrà le lagrime de l'opéra: Torquato Tasso de Donizetti
- Op. 449, Improvisation on J. Strauss's Kronungs-Walzer
- Op. 450, Fantasie Lyrique on a Swiss Theme
- Op. 451, Impromptu Brillant & Militaire on a March from Donizetti's 'Sultan Mahmoud'
- Op. 452, Introduction & Grand Variations on an Original Theme
- Op. 453, 110 easy and progressive exercises, for pianoforte.
- Op. 454, 18 Rondeaux et variations sur des thêmes favoris
- Op. 455, National airs
- Op. 456, Rondo Brillant, "Son nom"
- Op. 457, The Spirit's Song by Shakespeare
- Op. 458, 3 Rondinos élégans sur des motifs favoris de Beethoven
- Op. 459, 5 Original Quadrilles
- Op. 460, Rondo élégant sur l'air favori Wo der Wiese grünes Band de l'opéra: Des Adlers Horst de Gläser : pour le pianoforte
- Op. 461, 3 Duos 3 Morceaux Faciles for Piano 4-Hands
- Op. 462, Rondo on the Theme from Auber's 'L'Ambassadrice'
- Op. 463, Theater-Bibliothek : für die Jugend
- Op. 464, 2 Rondinos Brillantes on Themes from Auber's 'L'Ambassadrice'
- Op. 465, Fantasie Brillante on Motifs from Auber's 'L'Ambassadrice'
- Op. 466, Hommage a Beethoven, 6 Rondos
- Op. 467, Fantaisie sur Air Ecossais
- Op. 468, Fantasie brillante sur des airs Irlandais
- Op. 469, Divertissement Brillant on a Theme from Auber's 'L'Ambassadrice' for Piano 4-Hands
- Op. 470, Souvenir du Voyage du Rhin, Fantasie Brillante
- Op. 471, Souvenir de Paris, Fantasie
- Op. 472, Recompenses Musical for the Young for Piano 4-Hands
- Op. 473, Rondo Elegant on a French Romance
- Op. 474, Fantasie & Variations on a Theme from Adam's 'Postillon de Longjomeau'
- Op. 475, Rondoletto Brillante on "La Cachucha"
- Op. 476, Divertisement Brillante on Adam's 'Postillon de Longjomeau' for Piano 4-Hands
- Op. 477, Introduction & Variations Brillantes on Adam's 'Postillon de Longjomeau' for Piano 4-Hands
- Op. 478, Rondo Brillant on Adam's 'Postillon de Longjomeau' for Piano 4-Hands
- Op. 479, 3 Rondos Faciles & Brillantes on Favorite Themes
- Op. 480, 6 Rondos for Piano 4-Hands
- Op. 481, 50 Practice Pieces for Beginners
- Op. 482, Invitation à la danse Divertimento
- Op. 483, 2 Esquisses charactéristiques sur des Thèmes de Bellini
- Op. 484, Rondino grazioso ou Impromptu brillant sur un thème italien favori : pour le piano
- Op. 485, Variations sur les Étoiles d'amour de Joh. Strauss sen.
- Op. 486, Rondino brillant sur la valse Le bal des artistes de Strauss. (Paris, Schonenberger. 1830s?)
- Op. 487, Rondeau brillant sur la 'Marche du Mariage du Duc d'Orléans'
- Op. 488, Marche du Couronnement de la Reine Victoria
- Op. 489, Quick Step du Couronnement de la Reine Victoria
- Op. 490, Introduction et variations brillantes : sur le galop favori de l'opéra Lucia de Lammermoor de Donizetti
- Op. 491, Rondeau brillant sur des Walses favorites de Jos. Lanner
- Op. 492, Variations sur Rosa Valse
- Op. 493, Fantaisie brillante sur des thèmes de l'opéra Le nozze di Figaro
- Op. 494, Fantasie Brillante sur Motifs de l'Italiana in Algeri
- Op. 495, Études progressives et brillantes
- Op. 496, Rondino sur la walse favorite de La reine Victoria
- Op. 497, Rondo on Hummel's Waltzes
- Op. 498, Les plaisirs du salon
- Op. 499, Exercise in 2 Octaves
- Op. 500, Complete theoretical and practical piano forte school, from the first rudiments ... to the highest ... state of cultivation ...
- Op. 501, 24 Very Easy Preludes in the Most Useful Keys
- Op. 502, 3 Thèmes variés
- Op. 503, Badinage Musical, Rondo de Galop
- Op. 504, Fantaisie et Variations Brillantes sur la Marche de « Moises »
- Op. 505, Six rondeaux instructifs et agréables pianoforte composés et doigtés à l'usage des élèves avancés et de la jeunesse
- Op. 506, 3 Rondinos sur des thèmes du Domino Noir d'Auber
- Op. 507, Fantaisie Romantique sur Le Domino Noir d'Auber
- Op. 508, Rondino gracieux sur les valses de Lanner
- Op. 509, Caprice sur un thème du Domino Noir d'Auber
- Op. 510, Fantaisie sur les Saisons de Haydn
- Op. 511, Duo Le Domino Noir d'Auber for Piano 4-Hands
- Op. 512, Grande Fantaisie pour piano et harpe
- Op. 513, Marche pour le Jour de Naissance de S.M. la Reine Victoria
- Op. 514, Quickstep pour le Jour de Naissance de S.M. la Reine Victoria
- Op. 515, Fantaisie sur La Création de Haydn
- Op. 516, Reminiscences from the Opera 'Guido et Geneva', 2 Bks.
- Op. 517, Reminiscences from the Opera 'Le Domino Noir', Fantasie for Piano 4-Hands
- Op. 518, Rondinetto on El Zapateado
- Op. 519, 6 Rondinos faciles sur des valses de J. Strauss
- Op. 520, 3 Rondinos Brillants sur des thèmes russes, espagnols et norwégiens
- Op. 521, Rondinetto Facile on a March of J. Strauss (Solo & Duet Versions)
- Op. 522, 3 Rondinos faciles sur 'Gemma e Giuramento'
- Op. 523, Impromptu Sentimental "Oh Nume Benefico"
- Op. 524, Variations faciles sur "Gott Erhalte" for Piano 4-Hands
- Op. 525, 3 Quadrilles (Solo & Duet Versions)
- Op. 526, Coronation Quadrille (Solo & Duet Version)
- Op. 527, Variations Faciles on a Theme from Haydn's 'The Creation' for Piano 4-Hands
- Op. 528, Rondino Facile sur un thème de La Création de Haydn for Piano 4-Hands
- Op. 529, 3 Morceaux de Salon, Brillants, et Caractéristiques
- Op. 530, Marche pour le Prince de Cambridge (Solo & Duet Versions)
- Op. 531, Marche pour la Coronation de S.M. l'Empereur d'Autriche à Milan (Solo & Duet Versions)
- Op. 532, Fantaisie Expressive on 'Torquato Tasso'
- Op. 533, Rondino Facile on a Theme Militaire of Beethoven (Solo & Duet Versions)
- Op. 534, 3 Fantaisies Brillantes sur Robert Devereux
- Op. 535, 2 Airs Russes Variés for Piano 4-Hands
- Op. 536, 12 Rondinos Faciles sur des thèmes écossais
- Op. 537, Nocturne Sentimental sur un thème de Strauss
- Op. 538, 3 Rondolettos Faciles sur des thèmes favoris
- Op. 539, 1re Grande Ouverture, Irlandaise (Solo & Duet Versions)
- Op. 540, 3 Fantaisies Brillantes sur l'opéra de Marschner 'Baber'
- Op. 541, 2 Prussian National Themes with Variations
- Op. 542, Variations et Finale on a Prussian National Theme
- Op. 543, 2e Grande Ouverture, Écossaise (Solo & Duet Versions)
- Op. 544, 3e Grande Ouverture, Anglaise(Solo & Duet Version)
- Op. 545, Hommage à la Reine Victoria, Fantaisie Brillante
- Op. 546, 12 Rondinos Faciles sur Fleurs Anglais, Ecossais, et Irlandais
- Op. 547, 3 Rondolettos Elegans sur des thèmes divers
- Op. 548, Rondo sur des thèmes de l'opéra 'Le tsar et le charpentier' (cf. Zar und Zimmermann by Albert Lortzing)
- Op. 549, Fantaisie sur des thèmes de l'opéra 'Le tsar et le charpentier'
- Op. 550, Impromptu et valse sur des thèmes de l'opéra 'Le tsar et le charpentier'
- Op. 551, Rondoletto sur un thème de l'opéra 'Le tsar et le charpentier'
- Op. 552, 3 Themes & Variations for Piano 4-Hands
- Op. 553, Sechs tägliche Oktav-Uebungen in fortschreitender Schwierigkeit (Six Octave Studies in Progressive Difficulty) für das Pianoforte
- Op. 554, 6 New Royal Quadrilles (Solo & Duet Versions)
- Op. 555, 8 scherzi capricciosi per il pianoforte
- Op. 556, 3 Favorite Airs & Variations
- Op. 557, 6 Ecossais Themes & Variations
- Op. 558, 6 Songs for Voice & Piano (Words by Mrs. Hemans)
- Op. 559, Impromptu varié on a Theme of Mozart
- Op. 560, Le Coureur Exercise Brillante
- Op. 561, 3 Rondolettos Faciles on Favorite Themes (Solo & Duet Versions)
- Op. 562, Collection of Sacred Music for Voice & Piano
- Op. 563, Impromptû brillant sur les Danses nationales éspagnoles : La Tiranna de Cadiz et la Gitana, dansée par Dlle Marie Taglioni (Breitkopf, 1839)
- Op. 564, Rondoletto on "Sound the Loud Timbrel" (Solo & Duet Versions)
- Op. 565, Velocity Studies
- Op. 566, Variations brillante on "Adeste Fideles"
- Op. 567, 6 Fantasies brillantes on Themes Ecossais & Irlandais (Solo & Duet Versions)
- Op. 568, 2 Rondinos Faciles sur Mazurka et Carneval
- Op. 569, 2 Fantasies on Handel's 'Alexander's Feast' & 'Messiah'
- Op. 570, Rondino brillant sur le choeur 'A travers ces rochers'
- Op. 571, Impromptu sur la choeur des Fées
- Op. 572, Reminiscences on the Opera 'Le Lac de fées', Fantasie
- Op. 573, Reminiscences on the Opera 'Le Lac de fées', Morceau de Salon
- Op. 574, Reminiscences de l'Opéra 'Le Lac des Fées'
- Op. 575, Die Schule des Vortrags und der Verzierungen
- Op. 576, Morceaux élégans on Favorite Themes
- Op. 577, 3 Amusements de Salon
- Op. 578, 6 Original Galops
- Op. 579, 2 Original Quadrilles
- Op. 580, Impromptu Sentimental on a Religious Song
- Op. 581, Rondino Facile on a Pastorale from Handel's 'Messiah' for Piano 4-Hands
- Op. 582, Rondo Elegant on the Opera 'Zanetta'
- Op. 583, Douze rondeaux amusants et instructifs pour le pianoforte à quatre mains, sur des thèmes les plus favoris des opéras français et italiens (Bronsvic, G. M. Meyer, jr., 1840s)
- Op. 584, Kleine theoretisch-praktische Pianoforte-Schule für Anfänger Pianoforte Primer, an Easy Instruction Book
- Op. 585, Rondino facile on 'Le Krakoviac' (Solo & Duet Version)
- Op. 586, 3 Rondinos on the Opera 'Zanetta'
- Op. 587, Fantasie brillante on the Opera 'Zanetta' for Piano 4-Hands
- Op. 588, Variations faciles on the Russian Theme "Dieu Conserve" (Solo & Duet Versions)
- Op. 589, 4 Morceaux faciles on English Themes for Piano 4-Hands
- Op. 590, 3 Themes & Variations on the Opera 'Le Sherif'
- Op. 591, Scherzo brillant on the Opera 'Le Sherif' for Piano 4-Hands
- Op. 592, Impromptu pastoral, "Poor Shepherd's Maid"
- Op. 593, XII rondinos faciles et doigtés pour le piano sur des motifs favoris de Mozart et Rossini
- Op. 594, Victoria Quadrille Quadrille pour les Noces de S.M. la Reine Victoria (Solo & Duet Versions)
- Op. 595, Marche Solenne pour les Noces de S.M. la Reine Victoria (Solo & Duet Versions)
- Op. 596, Der Engel der Geduld, Chanson Allemande Voice & Piano
- Op. 597, 2 Rondeaux élégants
- Op. 598, Galop brillant
- Op. 599, Practical Exercises for Beginners - Études, (Erster Wiener Lehrmeister im Pianofortespiel ) Could be used by beginner pianist
- Op. 600, School of Practical Composition (c.1835, 3 vols)
- Op. 601, Fantasia on Beethoven's 'Fidelio'
- Op. 602, Reverie sur la Romance Napolitaine Beppa
- Op. 603, Préludes et Fugues for Organ with Obligatory Pedal (1836)
- Op. 604, Huit nocturnes romantiques de différents caractères
- Op. 605, 2 Grand Fantasies on Nicolai's Opera 'Templario'
- Op. 606, 18 petits rondeaux et variations sur des mélodies populaires allemandes [musique] Deutsche Voklsgesänge : pour le piano pour faciliter les progrès des élèves avancés
- Op. 607, Préludes et Fugues pour l'orgue avec pédale obligée en la mineur (1838)
- Op. 608, Variations Brillantes sur Derniere Pensee de Weber
- Op. 609, 24 Airs populaires en rondeaux The Pianist's Library, 24 Very Easy Pieces (Solo, 4-Hand, & 6-Hand Versions)
- Op. 609, Les trois Sœurs, 45 rondinos for piano 6-hands based on music by various composers
- Op. 610, Rondo élégant
- Op. 611, Fantasie marine on Italian Themes
- Op. 612, Impromptu sentimental
- Op. 613, School of Expression (On National Airs, 4 Bks.)
- Op. 614, 3 Grand Fantasies on 'La vestale' (Solo & Duet Versions)
- Op. 615, Rondo de Salon
- Op. 616, 6 Rondos brillantes
- Op. 617, Variations brillants
- Op. 618, Douze rondeaux amusans : pour le pianoforte à quatre mains : sur des thèmes allemands et italiens
- Op. 619, Variations faciles, March in Blue Beard (Solo & Duet Versions)
- Op. 620, Grande Fantasie on the Opera 'Oberto'
- Op. 621, 12 Grande Fantasies on the Opera 'Cristina di Svezia'
- Op. 622, 3 Melodies variées, Les Fleurs d'Angleterre
- Op. 623, 3 Melodies variées, Les Fleurs d'Ecosse
- Op. 624, 3 Melodies Variees, Les Fleurs d'Irlande
- Op. 625, Productions de salon (Fantasies for piano and violin on various themes by Donizetti, composed with Leon Herz - his opp. 13–18.)
- Op. 626, 3 Fantaisies on Donizetti's Opera 'La fille du Regiment' (Solo & Duet Versions)
- Op. 627, 12 Préludes for Organ, Harmonium or Piano
- Op. 628, 2 Rondo Brillants
- Op. 629, 6 Amusings Rondolettos
- Op. 630, Grande Fantasie (2nd Irish Fantasia)
- Op. 631, Grande Fantasie (2nd Scotch Fantasia)
- Op. 632, 12 Etudes
- Op. 633, Air Varie
- Op. 634, Air Varie
- Op. 635, 18 Rondos Faciles
- Op. 636, Preliminary School of Finger Dexterity - 24 studii della piccola velocita per pianoforte... (German title from edition at Library of Congress - Vorschule zur Fingerfertigkeit auf dem Pianoforte.)
- Op. 637, 4 Brillant Fantasies on the Opera 'Rolla' (Solo & Duet Versions)
- Op. 638, Belle Viennoise, rondoletto brillant sur Anna, polka favorite de Strauss, pour piano (pub. Philadelphia, A. Fiot, 196 Chestnut St., Importer of music & musical instruments; New York, W. Dubois, 315 Broadway ca. 1850)
- Op. 639, Grand Duet
- Op. 640, Grand Duet
- Op. 641, Fantasie Brillante, Hommage au Prince Albert
- Op. 642, Grand Morceaux de Concert
- Op. 643, Grande Fantasie
- Op. 644, Grande Fantasie
- Op. 645, Fantasie sur Cimarosa
- Op. 646, 6 Rondeaux militaires
- Op. 647, Nocturne pour le piano (Vienna [1843])
- Op. 648, L'Impressions dans l'Opera, 6 Fantasies
- Op. 649, Variations Brillantes
- Op. 650, Concertino for Piano & Orchestra
- Op. 651, Charmes de la Danse
- Op. 652, 2 Grandes Fantasies on 'Les Martyrs' (Solo & Duet Versions)
- Op. 653, Fantasie Brillante on English Airs
- Op. 654, Grand Fantasia (3rd Irish Fantasia)
- Op. 655, 3 Fantasies Brillantes on the Opera 'Adelia'
- Op. 656, 3 Rondos Faciles
- Op. 657, 6 Rondos Brillantes
- Op. 658, Impromptu sur la Romanesca for Piano 4-Hands
- Op. 659, Grand Fantasia (3rd Scotch Fantasie)
- Op. 660, Rondo de Chasse
- Op. 661, 10 Rondolettos
- Op. 662, Graduale for Soprano & Organ
- Op. 663, Fantasie Brillante
- Op. 664, Fantasie Brillante
- Op. 665, 6 Rondinos
- Op. 666, 6 Rondos Brillantes
- Op. 667, Tableaux Mélodiques
- Op. 668, Souvenir de Weber Fantaisie Brillante sur 'Der Freyschutz'
- Op. 669, La Mazurka
- Op. 670, 12 Ecossais Brillantes
- Op. 671, Scherzo
- Op. 672, 24 Etudes élégantes
- Op. 673, 2 Rondinos sur les Diamans de la Couronne. Opéra d'Auber
- Op. 674, Fantasie Brillante
- Op. 675, Fantasie Brillante
- Op. 676, Fantaisie Brillante sur les Diamans de la Couronne. Opéra d'Auber
- Op. 677, 2 Quadrilles Faciles
- Op. 678, Bijoux a la Sontag
- Op. 679, Reminiscences de Rossini, 6 Fantasias
- Op. 680, Variations Concertantes for Piano 4-Hands
- Op. 681, Souvenir de Labitzky 3 Rondinos
- Op. 682, 3 Airs Varies
- Op. 683, Mariner's Fantasia
- Op. 684, Aufmunterung zum Fleiss: 24 unterhaltende Übungstücke [für das Pianoforte]
- Op. 685, 6 Menuets
- Op. 686, Grande sonate pour piano et violon (pub. 1842) (Breitkopf & Härtel no. 6676, their publication may be of later date.)
- Op. 687, 3 Pieces Fugitves de Salon
- Op. 688, Melodie Sentimental
- Op. 689, Grande Fantasy on the themes of 'Norma' by Vincenzo Bellini for piano, 6 hands
- Op. 690, 12 Rondinos
- Op. 691, 3 Rondos
- Op. 692, 24 Grand Etudes de Salon
- Op. 693, 4 Airs Varies
- Op. 694, Etudes for the Young, 24 Preludes
- Op. 695, 12 Rondinos
- Op. 696, 60 Preludes
- Op. 697, Fantasie
- Op. 698, 20 Voluntaries (Preludes) for Organ with obligatory pedal
- Op. 699, Études, (Kunst der Fingerfertigkeit )
- Op. 700, Délassement de l'Etude, 12 Rondos Faciles
- Op. 701, 6 Rondinos on the Opera 'Duc d'Olonne'
- Op. 702, Impromptu on the Opera 'Duc d'Olonne'
- Op. 703, Fantasie on the Opera 'Duc d'Olonne' for Piano 4-Hands
- Op. 704, 3 Rondos Brillantes
- Op. 705, 3 Rondos Brillantes
- Op. 706, Variations élégantes pour servir d'Ëtude 24 New Etudes on English Airs
- Op. 707, 4 Fantasies on Scotch & Irish Airs
- Op. 708, 4 Fantasies on Donizetti's Opera 'Linda di Chamounix'
- Op. 709, 18 Rondinos
- Op. 710, Amusement de la Jeunesse, 6 Overtures
- Op. 711, Rondino Brillant sur la Favorite
- Op. 712, Rondino Brillant sur Reine de Cypre
- Op. 713, Pensee Fugitive
- Op. 714, 24 Rondinettos
- Op. 715, Impromptu Orageux
- Op. 716, Grand Duo for Piano 4-Hands
- Op. 717, Grandes Variations for Piano 4-Hands
- Op. 718, 24 Études, (Etüden für die linke Hand )
- Op. 719, Duo for Piano & Harp
- Op. 720, 3 Morceaux Brillantes
- Op. 721, 50 Rondos, La Jeunesse Docile
- Op. 722, 10 Petite Fantaisies on Airs from Mercadantes Operas
- Op. 723, 6 Rondos de Salon
- Op. 724, Fantaisie brillante sur des airs chinois
- Op. 725, 3 Rondos
- Op. 726, Salve Regina : offertorio per coro con accompagnamento di due violini, viole, violoncello e basso, un flauto, due clarinetti, due fagotti e due corni ed anche con accompagnamento di organo o pianoforte
- Op. 727, 12 Etudes for 2 Pianos
- Op. 728, 3 Bluettes de Salon
- Op. 729, Panorama beliebter Melodien aller Nationen Collection of Morceaux Brillantes
- Op. 730, Piano Sonata no. 11 in D♭, composée et dédié à monsieur le Baron de Lannoy
- Op. 731, Souvenir de Milan, 2 Fantasias
- Op. 732, German Chorus with Solos, "Geist der Harmonie"
- Op. 733, 6 Rondeaux brillants et faciles sur des motifs favoris for Piano 4-Hands
- Op. 734, 3 Aris Varies
- Op. 735, Terzen-Übung und Etude für die Linke Hand (Three etudes for the left hand alone.)
- Op. 736, 3 Fantasias
- Op. 737, Benedicat, Offertorio for 4 Voices & Orchestra
- Op. 738, Quadrille
- Op. 739, Rondoletto sur Part du Diable
- Op. 740, The Art of Finger Dexterity, (Kunst der Fingerfertigkeit ) (Études)
- Op. 741, Les trois amateurs: fantaisies brillantes: à six mains pour le piano (piano six hands)
- Op. 742, 2 Rondeaux brillants sur 'La Part du Diable'
- Op. 743, German Chorus
- Op. 744, Impromptu sur Part du Diable
- Op. 745, Reminiscences sur Part du Diable
- Op. 746, 2 Divertissements sur Part du Diable for Piano 4-Hands
- Op. 747, 3 Divertissements
- Op. 748, Le début, 25 Études
- Op. 749, 25 Studies for Small Hands (Rather More Difficult)
- Op. 750, 10 Morceaux Faciles
- Op. 751, Studies, piano duet
- Op. 752, Fantaisie sur des mélodies de Beethoven
- Op. 753, 30 Etudes Brillants
- Op. 754, 6 Etudes de Salon
- Op. 755, 25 Etudes Melodieux (Etude in A, No. 18)
- Op. 756, Le Parfait Pianiste: 25 Grandes Études de Salon.
- Op. 757, Offertorio for Soprano & Orchestra
- Op. 758, Rondos on Motives from Wagner Operas
- Op. 759, Variations brillantes et non difficiles Variations on a Theme from the Opera 'Rienzi'
- Op. 760, Ave Maria, Offertorie for Soprano & Orchestra
- Op. 761, Impromptu
- Op. 762, Allegro de Salon
- Op. 763, Scherzino alla Tarentella
- Op. 764, Religion, Poem Allemande for Tenor & Piano
- Op. 765, Étude courante
- Op. 766, Les Guirlandes, 12 Rondinos Faciles & Brillantes on Favorite Themes
- Op. 767, Fleurs de l'expression, 50 studies
- Op. 768, Esercizio Fugato
- Op. 769, 48 Rondinos on Favorite Themes
- Op. 770, 2 Rondolettos on the Opera 'Stradella'
- Op. 771, 24 Rondinos for Piano 4-Hands
- Op. 772, 2 Rondolettos on the Opera 'Les Puits d'Amour'
- Op. 773, Le début du jeune pianiste: 6 rondinos pour le pianoforte.)
- Op. 774, 2 Fantasies Brillantes
- Op. 775, 24 Rondinettos tres Faciles
- Op. 776, Impromptu Fugue for Pianoforte
- Op. 777, 24 Exercises for the Five Fingers.
- Op. 778, 6 Rondinos on the Opera 'Stradella'
- Op. 779, L'infatigable : grande étude de vélocité pour le piano
- Op. 780, Symphony no. 1 in C minor "Grand Symphony"
- Op. 781, Symphony no. 2 (of 6) in D major
- Op. 782, 6 Fantasias on Scotch Airs for Piano Duet
- Op. 783, 2 Rondolettos on a Theme from the Opera 'Le Domino Noir'
- Op. 784, De Profundis, for Chorus & Small Orchestra
- Op. 785, 25 Grand Characteristic Studies
- Op. 786, 6 Fantasias on Irish Themes for Piano Duet
- Op. 787, Galop brillant
- Op. 788, Sonate im Style des Domenico Scarlatti für das Pianoforte
- Op. 789, Scherzino
- Op. 790, Musicalisches Wochenblatt (Collection of Easy Pieces, 52 Numbers in the Year)
- Op. 791, Fleurs Melodiques, 12 Pieces de Differns Caracteres
- Op. 792, Premiers moyens d'acquérir de la dextérité sur le piano, 35 studies
- Op. 792b, Grand exercice des arpèges
- Op. 793, Morceau d'Album
- Op. 794, Le Plaisir du jeune Pianiste : après les premières Leçons; Choix de cent-soixante petites Récréations en formes d'Airs, Fantaisies, Rondolettos, Transcriptions, Chansons sans Paroles, Danses, Scherzos, Variations, etc. etc. Sur les Mélodies les plus Favorites
- Op. 795, 8 Morceaux de Salon (Chanson sans Paroles, No. 1)
- Op. 796, Fantasie sur l'Ode Symphony 'Columbus' de David (Solo & Duet Versions)
- Op. 797, 10 Grandes Fantasies Concertantes for 2 Pianos
- Op. 798, 6 Divertimentos for Piano 6-Hands
- Op. 799, 6 Pange Lingua for SATB
- Op. 800, 2 Fantasies on Motifs from the Opera 'La Fille du Regiment'
- Op. 801, L'Agreable Union, Soirees Amusantes . 6 Rondeaux Brillante & Facile for Piano 4-Hands
- Op. 802, Exercices pratiques des doigts
- Op. 803, Vierzig leichte Tonstücke in fortschreitender Ordnung : für Anfänger im Pianofortespiel; als erstes Hülfsmittel zur Förderung des Notenlesens, der Fingerfertigkeit und des Vortrags
- Op. 804, Album élégant des Dames-Pianistes, 24 Morceaux mélodieux
- Op. 805, 3 Rondeaux, Galops brillants
- Op. 806, Rondeau brillant
- Op. 807, Neue Studien
- Op. 808, Rondeau brillant de Salon (Cassel: Luckhardt, 1850)
- Op. 809, Heliose an Abälards Grabe
- Op. 810, Rondeau Brillant
- Op. 811, Beliebte Thema mit Variationen im brillanten Salon-Styl
- Op. 812, Offertorium, 'Salva nos Domine', Bass and Organ
- Op. 813, Fantasia on the Ruins [of Athens?]
- Op. 814, Brilliante Fantasie on Don Juan
- Op. 815, Umriss der ganzen Musikgeschichite (2 vols.)
- Op. 816, Quatuor concertant n° 2, 4 Pianos
- Op. 817, 80 Leichte und fortschreitende Anfängerstücke
- Op. 818, 50 Studien zur Gelenkigkeit der Finger
- Op. 819, 28 melodisch-rhythmische Studien
- Op. 820, 90 Daily Studies
- Op. 821, 160 Eight-Measure Exercises - Études, ( Achttaktige Übungen ) (160 Eight-Measure Studies)
- Op. 822, Gradus ad Parnassum; collection de grands exercices de tout genre dans le style élégant et dans le style sévère, pour le piano
- Op. 823, "The Little Pianist"
- Op. 824, Praktische Taktschule = (École pratique de la mesure) für Pianoforte zu 4 Händen
- Op. 825 (André), Amusement des jeunes amateurs, petites et brillantes récréations en forme de rondos et variations pour piano composés par Charles Czerny, Op. 825
  1. Elfin Waltz
  2. National Schottisch
  3. Montecchi E Capuletti
  4. Puritani, Polacca
  5. Aurora Waltz
  6. Zapateado
  7. Russian Hymn
  8. Magic Flute
  9. Wm. Tell
  10. Don Juan
  11. Petit Tambour
  12. Carnaval De Venise
- Op. 825 (Cranz), - Kinderklavierschule
- Op. 825 (Thieme), - Kleine und brillante Unterhaltungstücke, Piano 4 Hands
- Op. 827, Rondinos et variations, Piano 4 Hands
- Op. 828, Rondinos et variations élégants
- Op. 829, Melodisch-brillante Studien
- Op. 830, Saltarella capriciosa
- Op. 832, Morceaux de caractère
  1. L'Agitation
  2. Romance
  3. Confiance
  4. Réjouissance
  5. Persuasion
  6. Les Chasseurs
  7. La Mazourka
  8. Les Papillons
  9. Courante
  10. Sonnerie harmonique
  11. Jubilation
  12. Saltarelle
- Op. 833, 3 Rondinos
- Op. 834, Die höhere Stufe der Virtuosität : neue Folge der Schule der Geläufigkeit für das Pianoforte
- Op. 835, Méthode pour les enfants
- Op. 836, Krause-Etudes
- Op. 837, Das moderne Klavierspiel
- Op. 838, Studien zur Kenntnis aller Akkorde des Generalbasses
- Op. 840, 50 exercices progressifs dans tous les tons
- Op. 841, 15 rondinos for solo piano on beloved themes
- Op. 842, 6 Morceaux faciles
- Op. 843, 10 Pièces
  1. Polka bohémienne hongroise
  2. Defilier-Marsch
  3. Mädele, ruck, ruck, ruck
  4. Die schönsten Augen (Stigelli)
  5. Torquato Tasso
  6. An Alexis (Himmel)
  7. Barcarolle vénitienne
  8. Les Yeux bleus (Arnaud)
  9. Polka (Strauss)
  10. Galop-Rondino
- Op. 844, 20 Rondinos for 2 Pianos
- Op. 845, 12 Grandes Études d'agilité et perfectionnement
- Op. 846, Impromptu
- Op. 848, Nouveaux Exercices Journalier
- Op. 849, 30 Études de mécanisme (Studies of Mechanism), introduction to op. 299
- Op. 850, 5 Fantaisies brillantes et concertantes, Piano 8 Hands
- Op. 852, Etude and fugue (Stuttgart: E. Hallberger, 1858)
- Op. 853, Étude en forme de tarantelle
- Op. 854, La Clochette (Bagatelle)
- Op. 855, Études mélodiques, concertantes et faciles, Piano 4 Hands
- Op. 856, The Pianist in the Classical Style (48 Preludes and Fugues)
- Op. 857, Grande fantaisie sur Si j'étais roi, Piano 4 Hands
- Op. 858, 30 études mélodiques et concertantes pour piano
- Op. 859, 5 Morceaux mignons
- Op. 860, Obéron (Grand duo brillant et concertant, 2 Pianos)
- Op. 861, 30 Studies for Left hand

== Probably without opus ==
- Letters to a Young Lady on the Art of Playing the Pianoforte
- Variations on the Beloved Sehnsucht Waltz by Ludwig van Beethoven
- Symphony in D (1814?) (Allegro molto quasi presto - Adagio quasi andante in F - Scherzo: Molto presto in D minor - Allegro molto in D)
- Symphony no. 3 in C major?
- Symphony no. 4 in D minor?
- Symphony no. 5 in E♭ (1845) (published Leipzig : MVMC, 2001, c1997)
- Symphony no. 6 in G minor (his last symphony)
- First Piano Concerto, in D minor (1811–12)
- "Nonet" for Cor anglais, Clarinet, Bassoon, Horn, 2 Violins, Viola, Violoncello, Double Bass and Piano (1850)
- Ireland: 2 Popular Irish Airs (1860)
  1. Paddy Carey
  2. The Legacy
- Andante e polacca for horn and piano
- Beatus vir : for SATB voices, a cappella (published by New York : Lawson-Gould Music Publishers; Miami, Fla. : Warner Bros. Publications [distributor], 2001.)
- There is, according to a Canadian Broadcasting recording, a "Grand sonata" for violin and piano written in 1807 in A major recorded which may or may not be that which was published in 1842.
- Many string quartets (over 20? Possibly as many as 40)

String quartet in C minor edited by Bernhard Pauler from Sources/Manuscript and published by Amadeus-Verlag, Winterthur in 2006
String quartet no. 20 in C major, 1849: holograph of manuscript score (and parts?) at Library of Congress
String quartet no. 28 in A♭ major, 1851: holograph at Library of Congress
String quartet in A minor: unpublished manuscript at Gesellschaft der Musikfreunde, Vienna
String quartet in D minor: unpublished manuscript at Gesellschaft der Musikfreunde, Vienna
String quartet in D major: unpublished manuscript at Gesellschaft der Musikfreunde, Vienna
String quartet in E minor: unpublished manuscript at Gesellschaft der Musikfreunde, Vienna
Also http://www.concertzender.nl/programmagids.php?date=2003-11-01&month=-44&detail=3228

- From the Altenberg trio site - several unpublished piano trios (22 trios, published and unpublished, in all).

Note:

- A catalog was published in 1834 titled "Carl Czerny's sämmtliche Original-Compositionen von opus 1 bis 300" by Diabelli, a copy of which is owned by The National Library of Canada. This is not a combined score of the 300 works, but a list, possibly with incipits (main themes, first lines/bars of each.)

== Czerny's arrangements, editing projects, etc. ==
- Bach keyboard works (some edited, some arranged, a solo keyboard partita into a flute and piano work, for example)
- Beethoven symphonies and overtures, sonatas for piano, for violin and for cello (including an arrangement for cello from Violin Sonata No. 9 (Beethoven), »Kreutzer« sonata, by Czerny), and chamber works for larger ensembles
- Haydn symphonies
- Mozart symphonies among other works (Deutsche Tänze)
- Operas by Donizetti and others
- Four-hand piano adaptation of the Mozart Requiem
