= Athineos =

Athineos (Greek: Αθηναίος) is a Greek surname. Notable people with the surname include:

- George Athineos (1923–2002), Greek-American football player
- Nikos Athineos, Greek conductor, composer and pianist
