= Op. 127 =

In music, Op. 127 stands for Opus number 127. Compositions that are assigned this number include:

- Beethoven – String Quartet No. 12
- Czerny – Rondino for Piano Quintet
- Reger – Introduction, Passacaglia and Fugue
- Schumann – 5 Lieder und Gesänge
