= Symphony No. 1 (Czerny) =

Symphony by Czerny

Symphony No.1 in C minor
- Grand Symphony
- by Carl Czerny
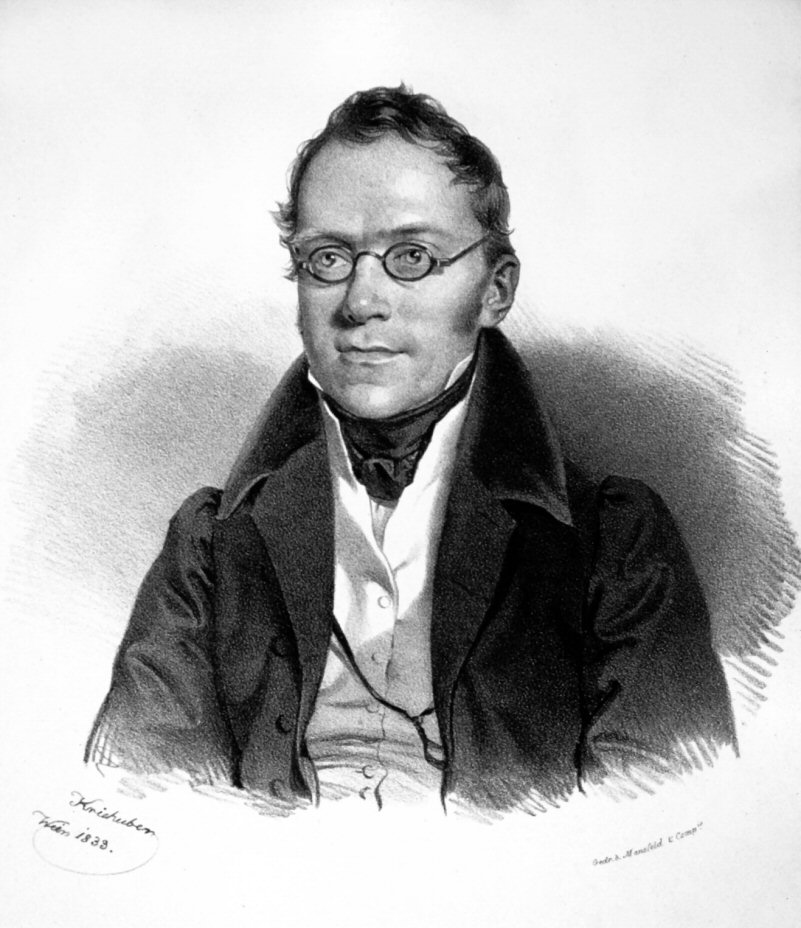
- Carl Czerny in 1833
- Opus: 780
- Style: Romantic period
- Dedication: Conservatory of Music in Vienna (composer's copy), Franz Liszt (Haslinger edition)
- Published: 1847 or earlier
- Movements: Four

Carl Czerny's Symphony No.1 in C minor, Op. 780, also known as the Grand Symphony, is a Romantic symphony in four movements.

== History and details ==
Although it was Czerny's first numbered symphony, he had written another symphony earlier, Symphony in D major, but it was not numbered. The work is dedicated to the Conservatory of Music in Vienna, according to the composer's copy. The Haslinger edition, however, lists Franz Liszt as the dedicatee. This symphony shows the influence of his teacher, Ludwig van Beethoven.

== Instrumentation ==
The symphony is scored for a piccolo (tacet in the 2nd movement), 2 flutes, 2 oboes, 2 clarinets, 2 bassoons, 4 horns, 2 trumpets, timpani, 3 trombones (tacet in the 2nd mvt.), ophicleide (tacet in the 2nd mvt.; replaced by tuba in modern performances), and strings.

== Form ==
This symphony consists of four movements:

1. Allegro agitato e con brio (C minor)
2. Andante sostenuto (A♭ major)
3. Scherzo. Vivace presto (C minor; trio in C major)
4. Finale. Allegro vivace (C minor)

A typical performance of this symphony lasts around 35 minutes.

=== I. Allegro agitato con brio ===
Like the first movement of most symphonies, this movement is in sonata form. It is in the key of C minor and has common time as its time signature.

The exposition starts with a fortissimo announcement of the first subject by full orchestra except the trombones and the ophicleide.

After a few transitions, it arrives in E♭ major, the relative key of the tonic key. The second subject is introduced, which contrasts the first subject. It is first played by the strings, then by the woodwinds. There is a closing theme and the exposition concludes in the same key and is repeated.

The development section begins by playing fragments of the rhythm of the first subject, followed by modulating the closing theme to other keys, such as E major, A minor, B♭ major. The second subject is developed in G♭ major and a few other keys. Then, there is a fugue section in the strings, which is at times doubled by the woodwinds. The music gradually becomes louder and the full orchestra plays the second subject in A♭ major. It also develops some of the transition themes. The music builds tension which leads to the recapitulation.

The recapitulation has the first subject played by full orchestra, including the trombones and ophicleide. The transition themes then follow, leading into the second subject played in C major, the parallel key.

The coda has fragments of the first subject and scales in the violins and other themes. The movement ends with C minor chords being played repeatedly by full orchestra.

=== III. Scherzo. Vivace Presto ===
This movement is in 3/4 time and in ternary form. The scherzo is played in C minor, followed by the contrasting trio in C major. The scherzo returns again and the movement ends.

== Recordings ==
The symphony has been recorded only a few times. The most notable example is by the Brandenburgisches Staatsorchester Frankfurt conducted by Nikos Athineos, which was recorded in 1997.

Another performance was recorded in 2002 by the Ulster Orchestra conducted by Jurjen Hempel.

In September 2026, a period instrument recording of the symphonies 1 and 2 by Kölner Akademie conducted by Michael Alexander Willens was published by cpo label.
