= Charles Péguri =

French accordionist

Charles Péguri (31 October 1879, Marseille – 21 March 1930) was a French accordionist of Italian descent and one of the pioneers of the musette genre.
