= Nikos Athineos =

Greek conductor, composer, and pianist

Nikos Athineos is a Greek conductor, composer and pianist with a long career as conductor in significant theaters and orchestras of Germany, first Artistic Director of Thessaloniki Concert Hall for ten years, director of Athens Conservatory.

== Early life and education ==
Nikos Athineos was born in Khartoum (Sudan) by Greek parents where he started began learning piano. When he was eleven, his family moved to Athens where he studied piano at the Athens Conservatory. At the same time he received lessons of harmony, counterpoint and composition with Günter Becker and Giannis A. Papaioannou.

After his piano diploma, awarded unanimously the grade “excellent" and First Prize (1968), he collaborated as a soloist with all major Greek orchestras. Ηe then left for Köln with a German scholarship, to complete his musical studies at the Cologne University of Musik (Hochschule für Musik –Köln) where he studied piano, composition and conducting.

== Career ==
He started his conducting career as assistant conductor at the Mannheim National Theatre (Opera). In the next years he served as opera conductor at the theaters of Pforzheim, Ulm and Darmstadt where he enriched his opera repertory and experience having conducted more than seventy (70) operas. In 1990 he was appointed as General Musical Director of the Philharmonic Orchestra of Frankfurt Oder. With this orchestra he assimilated a vast repertory of symphonic music and carried out numerous tours In Germany performing in Berlin, Köln, Bonn, Bremen etc. and abroad (Latvia, Israel, Russia, Spain, France, Holland, Belgium) appearing in major European cities such as Moscow, Madrid, Paris, Amsterdam, The Hague, Brussels, Tel Aviv etc. Furthermore, with said orchestra he recorded a considerable number of CDs some of which obtained international prizes and acclaims.

Under his direction this ensemble has been developed to the main symphonic orchestra of the Federal State of Brandenburg being upgraded and renamed to State Orchestra of Brandenburg Frankfurt (Brandenburgisches Staatsorchester Frankfurt).

In May 2000 he was appointed as the first Artistic Director at the newly established Thessaloniki Concert Hall.

During the years of his management as Artistic Director he put on many operas such as Traviata, Rigoletto, Madama Butterfly, Cavalleria rusticana, Le Nozze di Figaro, Abduction from the Seraglio, the basset Romeo & Juliet of Prokofiev etc. having conducted most of them. He also, put on and conducted “avant-garde” music works such as War Requiem of Benjamin Britten, Metropolis of Fritz Lang (silent film with orchestra live music) as well as other music masterpieces like Beethoven's Missa Solemnis or J. S. Bach's St. Matthew Passion and the great Mass in B minor.

As invited conductor, he has conducted various many great European orchestras like London Philharmonic in two performances during the Athens Festival (1989), Royal Philharmonic Orchestra, English Chamber Orchestra, Frankfurt Radio Symphony, Munich Symphony Orchestra, Hamburg Symphony Orchestra, Sinfonia Varsovia, Gustav Mahler Orchestra of Prague, Sofia Philharmonic Orchestra, Bulgarian National Radio Symphony Orchestra etc. cooperating with great soloists as Rostropovich, Agnes Baltsa, MIsha Maiski, David Garet, Lars Vogt, Kolja Blacher etc. He has also repeatedly collaborated with all the significant Greek Orchestras as the Athens State Orchestra, Thessaloniki State Orchestra, National Radio Symphony Orchestra, Greek National Opera's Orchestra, Camerata of Athens, Athens Symphony Orchestra, Thessaloniki Symphony Orchestra and Patras Symphony Orchestra.

== Special performances & distinctions ==
1994 - Two consecutive concerts, the first in Poznan at Poland and the second in Frankfurt Oder in the frame of manifestation of reconciliation between Germany and Poland after the Fall of the Berlin Wall where he conducted the Mahler's 8th Symphony with the participation and co-operation of both cities orchestras, two

choirs (Berlin & Poznan) and the Poznan boy's choir (totally 650 people on the scene).

2001 - Gala concert for the opening of the Frankfurt Book Fair 2001, dedicated to Greece, with the participation of Agnes Baltsa at the Alte Oper, Frankfurt, 10 October 2001

2002 - Concert in the Golden Hall of Musikverein in Vienna in 2002 on the occasion of assumption of European Union's presidency by Greece as the leader of the State Orchestra of Athens with Agnes Baltsa as soloist. For this performance - being the first outside Greece of this orchestra – he was proposed as nominee for the Great Award of the Union of Greek Critics for Drama & Music.

2007 – Concert with Beijing's Symphony Orchestra, Agnes Baltsa and Angelo Simo given for the opening of Cultural Year of Greece before the Olympic Games at Beijing of 2008

2009 - "GINA BACHAUER" International Music Foundation's Special Award for his overall contribution in the culture and music activity of Greece

== Compositions ==
Contemporary with his conducting career, Nikos Athineos presented over the years a significant number of music compositions, most known of them being “6 small pieces” for piano (1973-1974), “Tocata” for piano (1976), “Noneto” for Strings quartet and five wind instruments (1976), “Symphony in one part” (1978), Suite for strings orchestra (1976 / 2nd scripture 2010), “Ithaki” circle of six songs on poems of C.P.Cavafy for soprano, baritone and symphonic orchestra (2004-2006), “Elytis circle” on poems of Odysseas Elytis for soprano and symphonic orchestra (2011), “Concerto” for orchestra (2014).

== Current position ==
Currently, Nikos Athineos is the Director of the Athens Conservatory and Artistic Director and principal conductor of ACADEMICA Athens Orchestra while he continues appearing as invited conductor with significant orchestras in Greece and abroad.

== Recordings ==
1. Boris Blacher: Frankfurt Philharmonic Orchestra /Symphony - Violin Concerto - Poem for Large Orchestra / Kolja Blacher (violin)

2. Joseph Rheinberger: Frankfurt Philharmonic Orchestra / Wallenstein - Die sieben Raben – Ouverture

3. Gottfried von Einem: Frankfurt Philharmonic Orchestra / Symphonische Szene - Tanz-Rondo - Wiener Symphonie

4. Paul Dessau: Frankfurt Philharmonic Orchestra / Sinfonie in einem Satz - Symphonische Adaptation - Les Voix / Ksenija Lukic (soprano) - Horst Göbel (piano)

5. Josef Rheinberger: Frankfurt Philharmonic Orchestra / Hymnus an die Tonkunst - Das Thal des Espingo - Ouvertüre zu “Die Zähmung der Widerpenstigen”- Ouvertüre zu “Demetrius” - Akademische Ouvertüre - Fantasie für großes Orchester / Chor: St. Hedwigs-Kathedrale Berlin

6. Edouard Lalo: Frankfurt Brandenburg State Orchestra / Scherzo für Orchester - Klavierkonzert - Symphonie - Romance-Sérénade / David Gross (Piano) / Juri Toschmakow (Violine)

7. Carl Czerny: Frankfurt Brandenburg State Orchestra / Sinfonie Nr. 2 - Konzert für Klavier zu vier Händen und Orchester / Liu Xiao Ming / Horst Göbel (piano)

8. Werner Egk: Frankfurt Brandenburg State Orchestra / Ouvertüre zu “Die Zaubergeige” - Tango aus “Peer Gynt” - Triptychon aus “Joan von Zarissa” - Französische Suite - Kleine Sinfonie (1926)

9. Carl Czerny: Frankfurt Brandenburg State Orchestra / Sinfonie Nr. 1 - Sinfonie Nr. 5

10. Boris Blacher: Frankfurt Brandenburg State Orchestra / Concertante Musik - Konzert für Violoncello und Orchester - Orchester-Fantasie - Konzert-Ouvertüre - “Hamlet”, Sinfonische Dichtung / Ramon Jaffé (Violoncello)

11. Ignaz Moscheles: Frankfurt Brandenburg State Orchestra / Ouvertüre zu Schillers Trauerspiel „Die Jungfrau von Orleans“ - Klavierkonzert Nr.6, “Concerto fantastique“ - Sinfonie / Liu Xiao Ming (piano)

12. Franz Schreker in Berlin: Frankfurt Brandenburg State Orchestra / Alois Hába: Ouvertüre - Grete von Zieritz: “Japanische Lieder” - Karol Rathaus: Suite - Ernst Krenek: Drei lustige Märsche - Franz Schreker: Vier kleine Stücke für großes orchester / Barbara Hesse-Bachmeier (mezzo-soprano)

13. Aria – Gail Gilmore: Frankfurt Brandenburg State Orchestra / Arien von Carlos Gomes, Giuseppe Verdi, Giacomo Puccini, Richard Wagner, Carl Maria von Weber, Camille Saint-Saëns - Carl Maria von Weber: Ouvertüre zu “Oberon” - Pietro Mascagni: Intermezzo sinfonico aus “Cavalleria rusticana” / Gail Gilmore – Soprano

14. Expressionismus: Frankfurt Brandenburg State Orchestra / Franz Schreker: Phantastische Ouvertüre - Egon Wellesz: „Vorfrühling“ – Stimmungsbild für Orchester - Vladimir Vogel: Zwei Etüden für Orchester - Alfredo Casella: Elegia eroica für großes Orchester - Eugene Goosens: “Kaleidoscope“-Suite - Max von Schillings: Sinfonischer Prolog zu Sophokles’ „König Ödipus“ für großes Orchester - Alfredo Casella: Concerto Romano für Orgel und Orchester - Karol Rathaus: Ouvertüre op. 22, Suite für Violine und Orchester / Martin Schmeding – Orgel

17. J. S. Bach: Frankfurt Brandenburg State Orchestra / 5 Versions of Bach's BWV 582 Transcription for orchestra: Leopold Stokowski

18. Bella Bartok / Alfred Schnittke: Bulgarian National Radio Symphony Orchestra / Bella Bartok: Concerto for Viola & Orchestra - Alfred Schnittke: Concerto for Viola & Orchestra / Dimitar Penkov (viola)

== Sources ==
http://www.bsof.de/?s=3.1

http://www.bsof.de/?s=11&zuf=

http://www.tch.gr/default.aspx?lang=en-GB&page=44&id=2055

https://www.amazon.com/s/ref=sr_pg_1?rh=n%3A5174%2Ck%3ANikos+Athinaos&keywords=Nikos+Athinaos&ie=UTF8&qid=1493208932

http://athens-academica.com/academica-athens-orchestra-contributors/
