= Rondino for Piano Quintet (Czerny) =

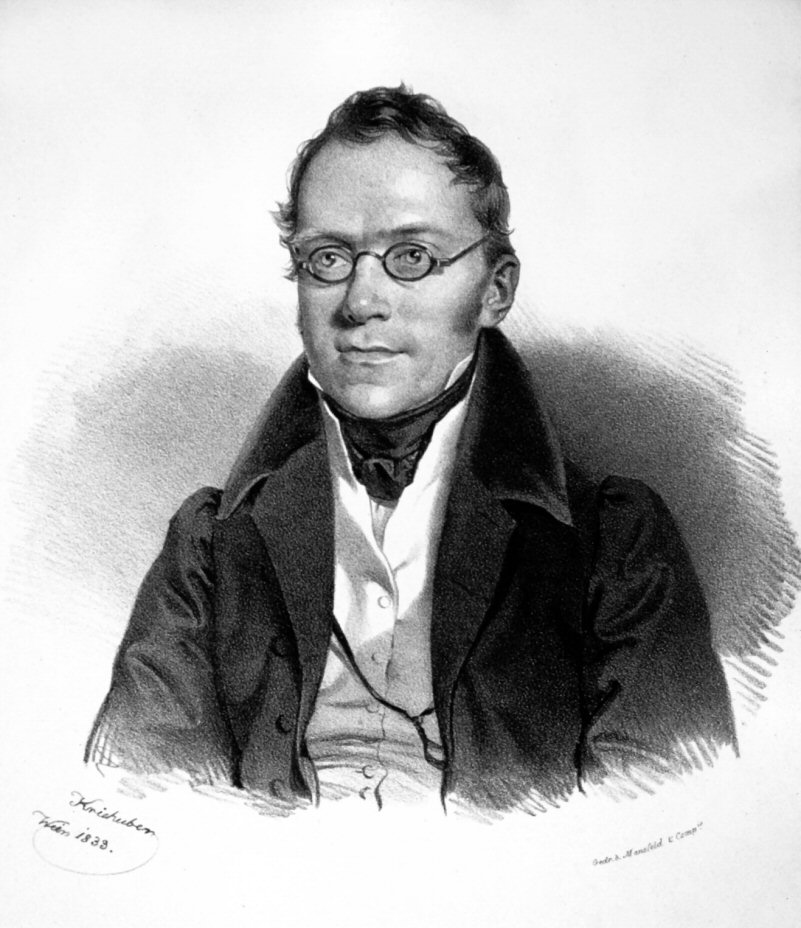
Carl Czerny in 1833

Carl Czerny's Rondino on a Theme of Auber for Piano Quintet, Op. 127 (French: Rondino sur un thême favori de l’opera Le maçon d’Auber. Pour le pianoforte avec accomp. de deux violons, alto et violoncelle, oeuv. 127) was published by Diabelli in 1826. Czerny bases his Rondino on the Ronde - The Round of the Good Worker from Act 1 of Auber's opera, Le maçon.

Scored for a standard piano quintet (Piano, 2 Violins, Viola, Cello), the composition is what the composer would have dubbed a "brilliant" piece, intended to show off the skills of the piano soloist in a concert setting. An arrangement has also been made of the piece for Piano and String Orchestra.

== Structure ==
The composition consists of a single multi-tempo movement divided into two sections, the F major Introduction (Marked: Andante) and the A major Rondino (Marked: Allegretto grazioso - Allegro vivace).
