= José Ramos Tinhorão =

Brazilian music critic (1928–2021)

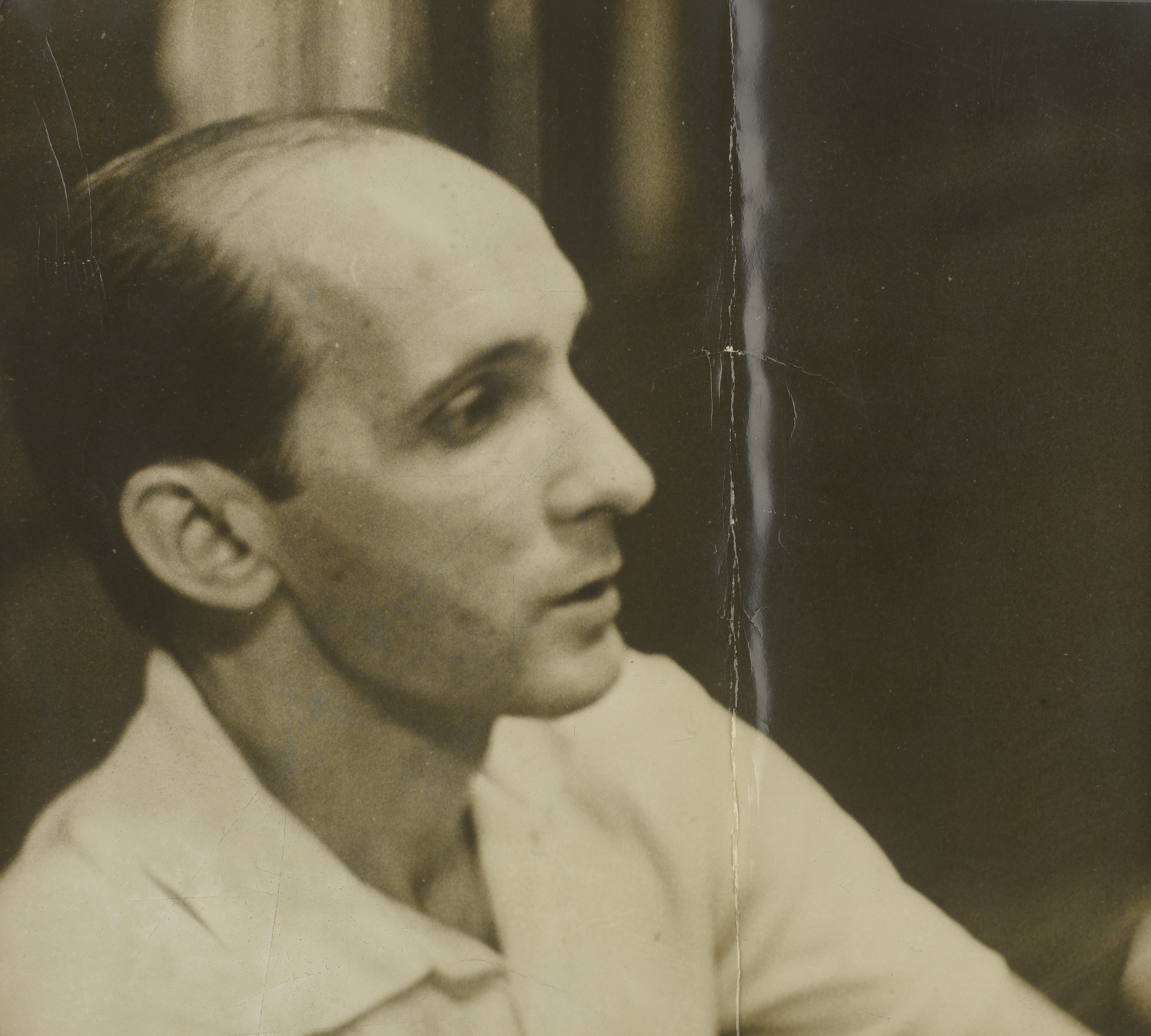
- Born: 7 February 1928; Santos, São Paulo, Brazil
- Died: 3 August 2021 (aged 93); São Paulo, Brazil
- Education: Federal University of Rio de Janeiro Faculty of Law; University of São Paulo
- Occupation: Music critic

José Ramos Tinhorão (7 February 1928 – 3 August 2021) was a Brazilian journalist, essayist, music critic, music historian and author of many books on Brazilian popular music. He was a lifelong detractor of the Bossa Nova movement, which he saw as pasteurized Jazz music assembled in the tropics.

== Early life ==
Born in Santos, in the state of São Paulo, Tinhorão was the eldest son of a family of Iberian immigrants (his father was Portuguese and his mother, the daughter of a Spaniard). His father worked as a waiter, sold lottery tickets and had a laundry shop. After all, he was invited by a friend to work at Urca's casino, in Rio de Janeiro, where his family moved in 1937, when the boy was nine years old.

== Career ==
Tinhorão got a bachelor's degree in law at the University of Brazil and in journalism at the National Faculty of Philosophy.

In 1951, while still an undergraduate student, he began working as a freelancer at Revista da Semana, a now-defunct Brazilian weekly magazine in Rio de Janeiro, where he signed his texts as J. Ramos. In 1952, he was taken by Armando Nogueira, his college friend, to work as a copy editor at the Diário Carioca, one of the most popular newspapers in Rio at the time.

It was there that José Ramos earned his nickname "Tinhorão" ("Caladium"), which refers to the name of a toxic ornamental plant that was accidentally incorporated into his own name. The nickname was given by Everardo Guillon, the newspaper's editorial secretary, but the definitive baptism, in print, came from the editor-in-chief, Pompeu de Sousa. According to Moreira Salles Institute, which keeps the Tinhorão archives, the first article signed by "J. Ramos Tinhorão", at the Diário Carioca, was published on 25 December of that year. The author was shocked when he read: "Report by J. Ramos Tinhorão for the Diário Carioca". Laughing, the boss replied: "J. Ramos is a name for pickpockets. There's a lot of them in the phone book. There will be only one Tinhorão!"

Tinhorão stayed at the Diário Carioca until the end of 1958, when he went to Jornal do Brasil invited by fellow journalist Janio de Freitas to write for the Sunday supplement. Two years later, in the context of the creation of Caderno B, JB's cultural supplement, Tinhorão begins his activities as a researcher of popular music, commissioned by Reynaldo Jardim, creator of Caderno B, who asked Tinhorão to write a series of articles on the history of samba.

== Music critic and researcher ==
In the 1960s, he would start paving his reputation as a grumpy and relentless music critic. A fierce opponent of Bossa Nova, he therefore faced several enmities against his staunch opinions. His harsh style is illustrated by a 1963 article for Senhor magazine: "Daughter of apartment adventures with the American music, who is undeniably her mother, Bossa Nova suffers from the same affliction as do many children from Copacabana, the neighborhood where she was born: she doesn't know who the father is."

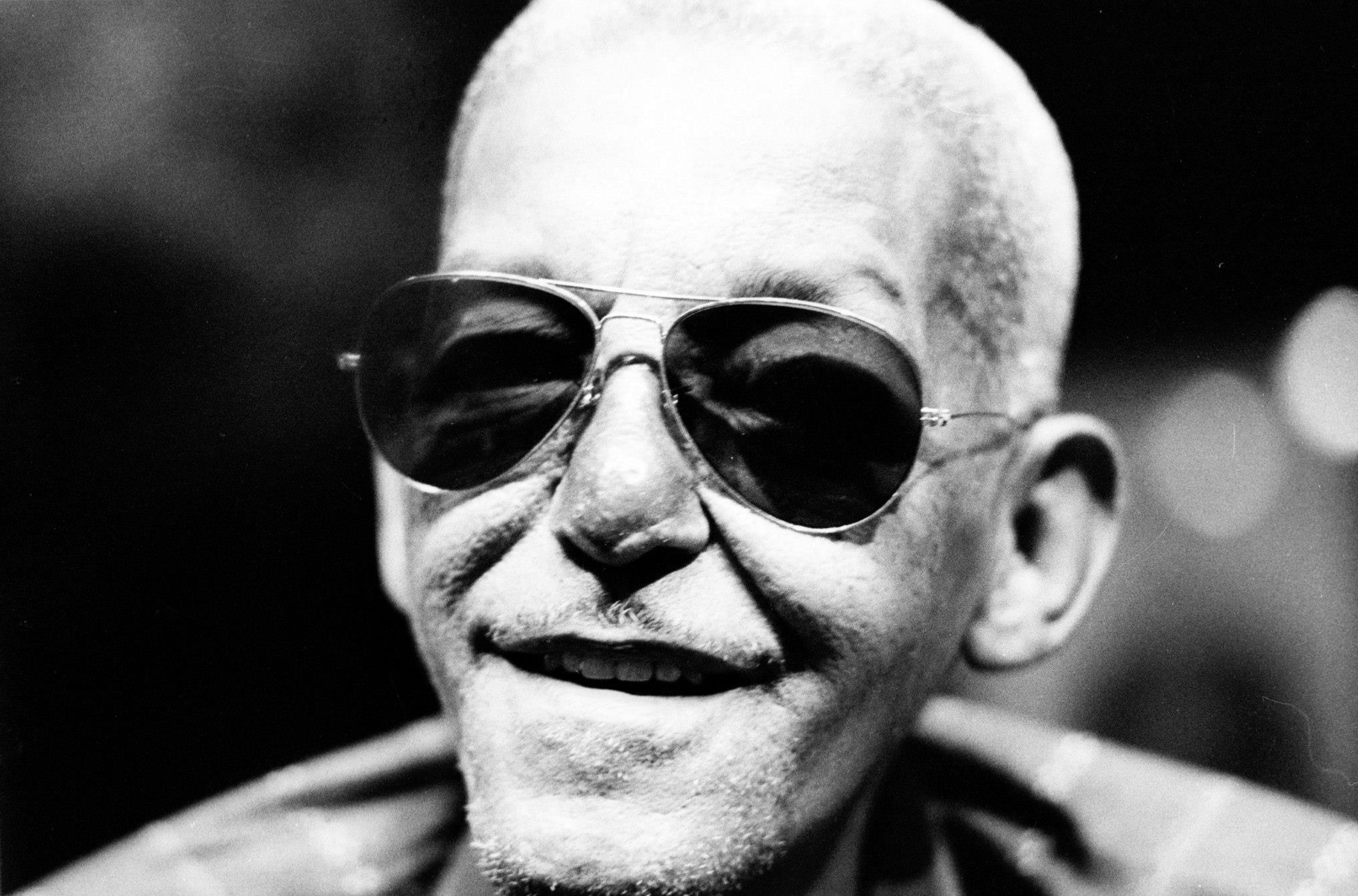
Cartola, an authentic Brazilian composer, according to Tinhorão

In his standpoint, Bossa Nova represented, in urban popular music, the "sonic equivalent of the illusions of Brazilian socioeconomic 'updating' to the standards of the modern capitalism of the technological age". In the name of modernity, Brazil would reject popular forms and genres, with Bossa Nova representing a deaf class conflict, at the level of mass culture, which would result in the middle class being set apart from the working classes.

He adds: "Bossa Nova was not a winning move for Brazilian music. Brazilians offered Americans a new outlook on their own music. It's easier for the average American to listen to it. Why does Frank Sinatra sing Tom Jobim and not Nelson Cavaquinho? Because it simply wouldn't match."

With a Marxist background and labeled as a radical nationalist, Tinhorão introduced sociological analysis in his music reviews.

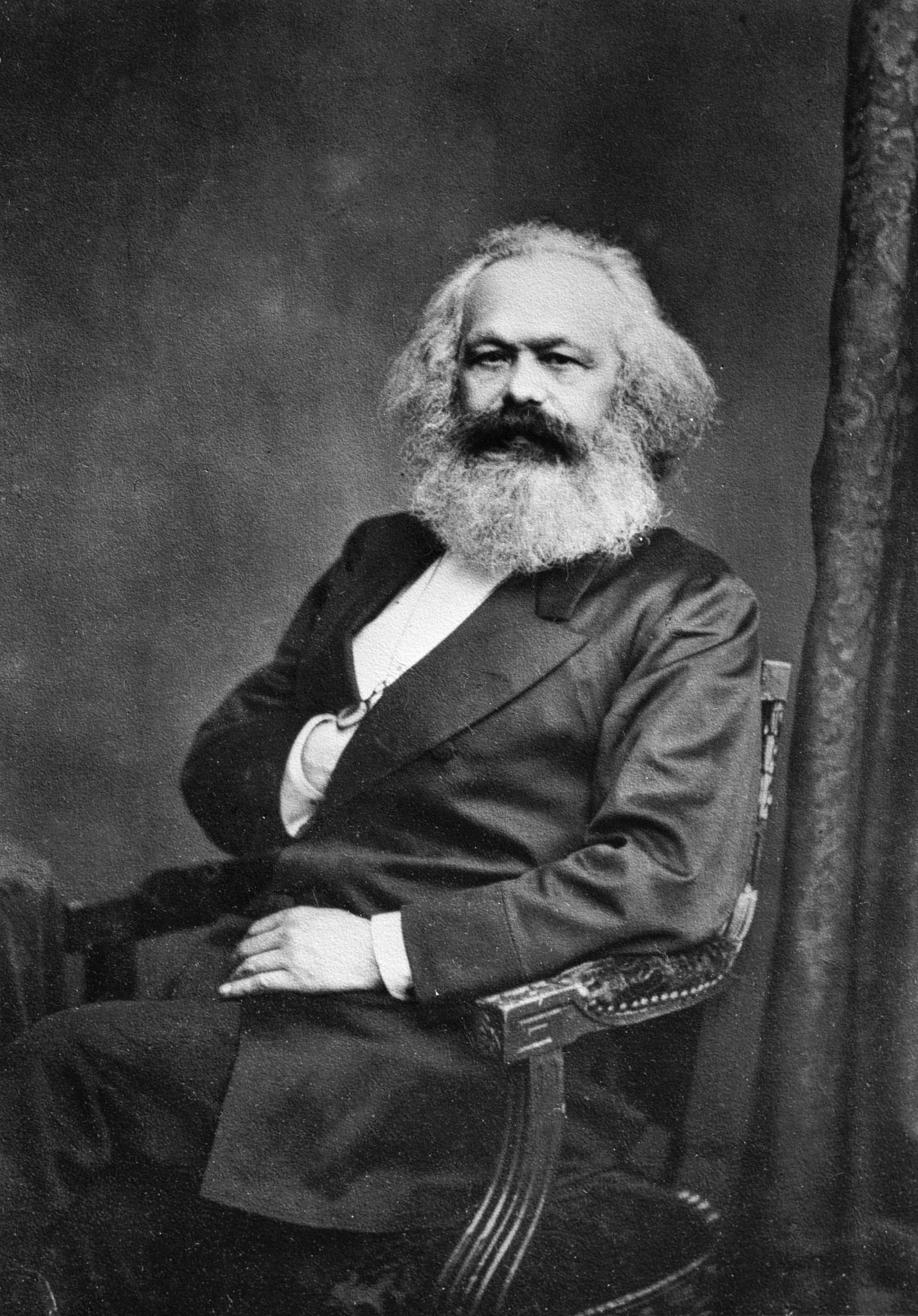
Karl Marx, German exponent of historical materialism

Faithful to historical materialism and dialectical materialism, he understood history as the chronicle of men in the world – and of their relations with nature and with each other in society. Since in a class society each social class projects its ideology on culture and cultural production expresses the ideology of the class that engendered it, then every culture in a class society is class culture.

Always based on the methodological approach proposed by Marx, he wrote for various media outlets in the 60s, in addition to JB itself: Tribuna da Imprensa, Jornal dos Sports, Agora, Jornal Rural, Singra, Revista Guaíra, Última Hora, Veja, Senhor, Diário Carioca, Jornal do Brasil, Cadernos de Estudos Brasileiros and O Globo. He collaborated with O Pasquim until 1989. In the 1990s, he definitively abandoned journalism and began to dedicate himself fully to historical research and book production. He obtained a master's degree in social history from the University of São Paulo in 1999. From his MD thesis, the book A imprensa carnavalesca no Brasil: um panorama da linguagem cômica (The Carnival Press in Brazil: an overview of the comic language) was born, published in 2000.

Tinhorão also worked for several television networks (TV Rio, TV Excelsior, TV Globo).

He remained as a journalist at Jornal do Brasil until 1963 and then collaborated as a critic between 1974 and 1982.

== Controversies and discoveries ==
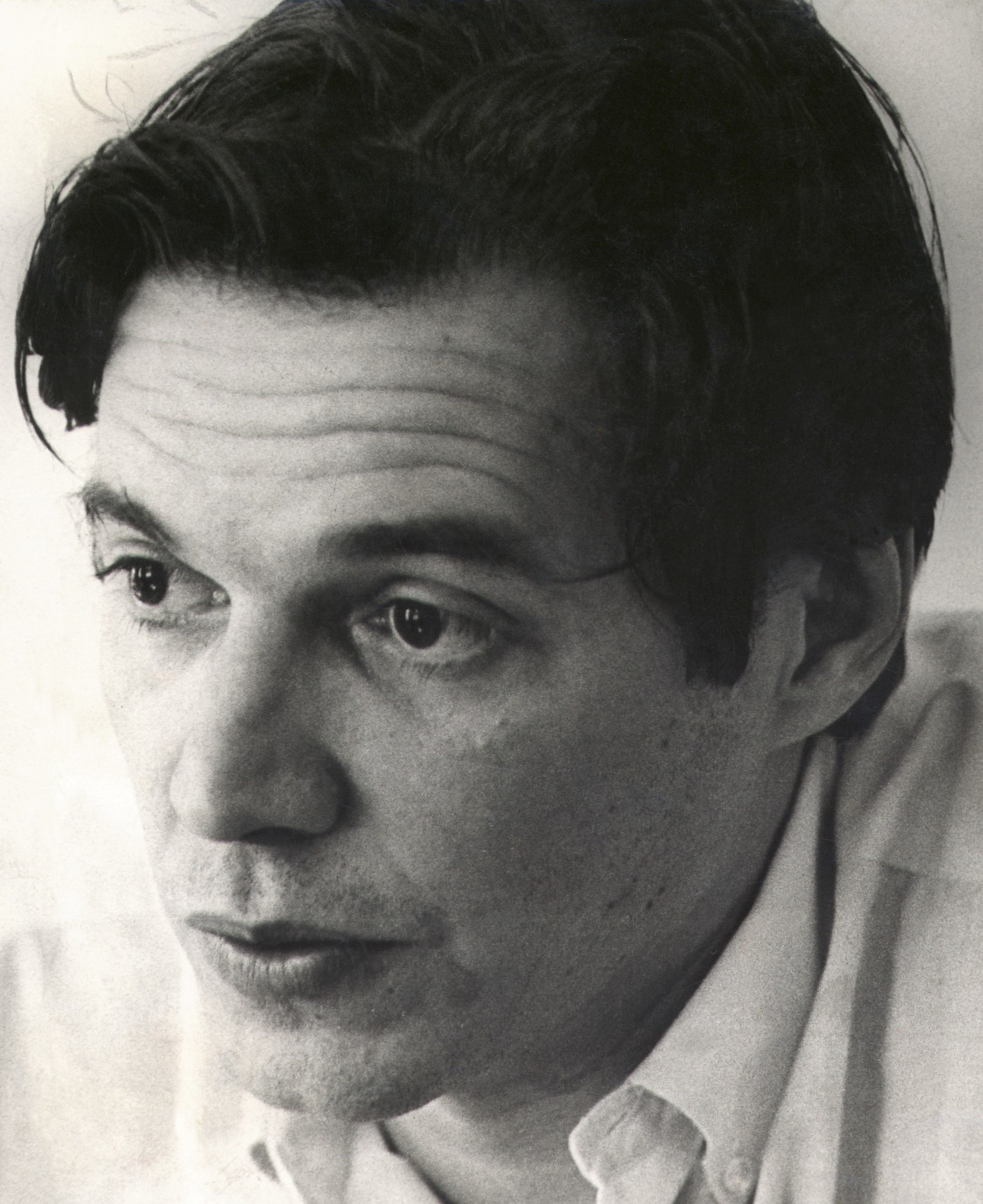
Tom Jobim, the so-called "father of Bossa Nova"

During his career, he became involved in numerous disputes with Brazilian musicians such as Tom Jobim, Chico Buarque, Caetano Veloso, Belchior and Paulinho da Viola, among others.

Tinhorão considered Jobim "not a creator, but an arranger". He wrote that Jobim's melody to the song Águas de Março would have been plain plagiarism of a macumba theme collected in 1933 by João Paulo Batista de Carvalho – which translates as "it's stick, it's stone, it's small pebble / Bahia rolls over everything". That was only one of several claims of plagiarism against Jobim and others made by Tinhorão.

Talking about João Gilberto, he said: "He is a good malandro. He gave samba an original syncopated beat, in which he could place any jazz harmony he wished (nothing but a boring tap drip rhythm). He took advantage of all the folklore around his persona and was acclaimed as a genius. Poor guy, have you seen his voice? He can't even articulate right anymore. And the air conditioning is to blame. I really admire that smartass!"

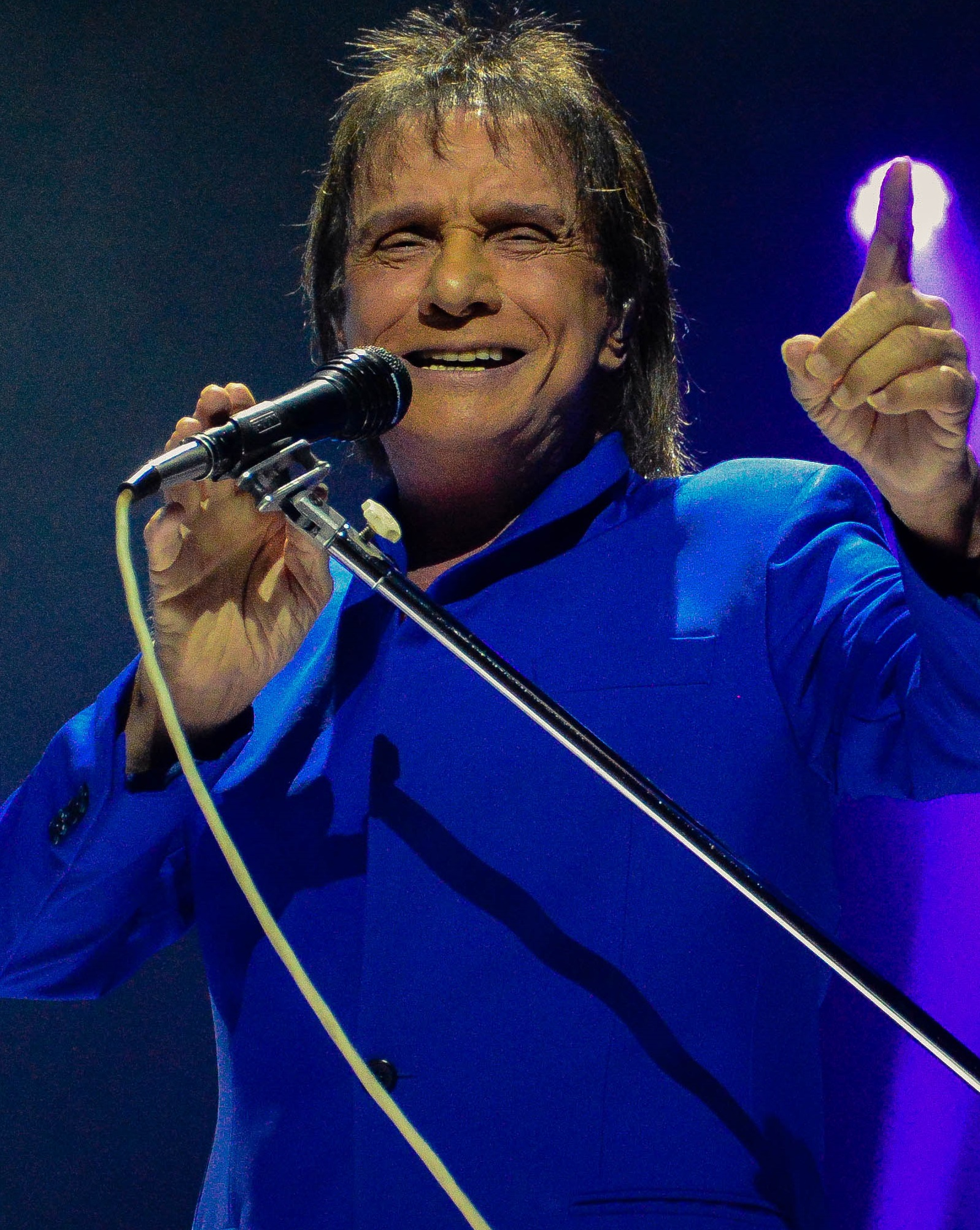
Roberto Carlos, an artist seen by Tinhorão as "alienated"

Tinhorão attacked the Brazilian movement Tropicália and recognized its delusions of grandeur to newspaper Folha de São Paulo in 2014: "The same Gilberto Gil who now advocates nationalism in Brazilian art wore long negligees with a Rhodia print fifty years ago", he said.

Is there anything called Japanese samba? No, there isn't. So there is no Brazilian rock either. The basis of popular music is rhythm and this rhythm emerged in the United States through a historical process in American life.

— Tinhorão on Brazilian rock

To him, Brazilian movement Jovem Guarda was "simplified rock for suckers" and sertanejo music was "neither urban nor country music". He praised Brazilian rap, though, arguing it was a present-day recovery of the classic emboladas (improvised Brazilian songs sung by a duo in public venues like squares and downtown streets, accompanied by pandeiros and guitars).

He didn't spare even Portuguese-born Brazilian star Carmen Miranda, stating: "Carmen Miranda was a victim of Hollywood show business. She left for America beautiful and full of energy and returned inside a coffin, disfigured by tranquilizers".

He recognized the talent of samba and choro composers and singers such as Pixinguinha, Noel Rosa, Monarco and João Nogueira, as well as modern names like Elomar Figueira Mello, Vital Farias and Antonio Nóbrega.

Domingos Caldas Barbosa

In his book Domingos Caldas Barbosa, the poet of the viola, modinha and lundu, he defends another controversial thesis – that the Portuguese genre fado was born in Brazil, not on the wharf of Lisbon, and values the influence of slaves in the Iberian culture, conversely to common Portuguese academic beliefs. According to Tinhorão, "fado arrived in Portugal at the end of the 18th century as the black dance of Brazil. It had a singing intermezzo. There are documents that show female fado singers in São Paulo as early as 1740, when people not even talked about it in Lisbon. Fado only became popular in Portugal because of Caldas Barbosa."

In 1966, he published the first of more than twenty books he would bring out on the history of Brazilian popular music, Popular Music: a topic in debate.

The first ever recording of the Brazilian national anthem (1901), one of Tinhorão's findings

He was also an avid collector. During his lifetime, he amassed around six thousand 78 rpm records, commercially released between 1902 and 1964, and another four thousand LPs (33 rpm), launched between 1960 and the mid 1990s. In addition to audio files, the researcher kept more than 14,000 books on popular culture and over 35,000 documents, photos, films, sheet music, pianola rolls, leaflets, magazine and newspaper collections related to music. In 2001, Tinhorão's collection was purchased and digitized by Instituto Moreira Salles, and it is now available on the internet.

=== Death ===
José Ramos Tinhorão died on 3 August 2021, in the city of São Paulo, aged 93. He had been hospitalized with pneumonia two months earlier and was weakened by a stroke he had suffered in 2018. He was buried in the Protestant's Cemetery, in the Higienópolis neighborhood of the city.

== Works ==
- A Província e o Naturalismo (1966)
- Música Popular: um tema em debate (1966)
- O samba agora vai: a farsa da música popular brasileira no exterior (1969)
- Música Popular: cinema e teatro (1972)
- Música Popular: os índios, negros e mestiços (1972)
- Pequena História da Música Popular: da modinha à canção de protesto (1975)
- Os sons que vêm da rua
- Os sons dos negros no Brasil: cantos, danças, folguedos: origens (1988)
- Os negros em Portugal: uma presença silenciosa (1988)
- Música Popular no Romance Brasileiro (1992):
  - Séculos XVIII e XIX – Vol. 1
  - Século XX – Vol. 2
  - Século XX – Vol. 3
- Fado: dança do Brasil, cantar de Lisboa, o fim de um mito (1994)
- História social da música popular brasileira (1990)
- As origens da canção urbana (1997)
- As festas no Brasil colonial (1999)
- A Imprensa Carnavalesca no Brasil – Um panorama da linguagem cômica (2000)
- Música popular: o ensaio é no jornal (2001)
- Cultura Popular – Temas e Questões (2001);
- Domingos Caldas Barbosa, o poeta da viola, da modinha e do lundu: 1740–1800 (2004)
- O rasga: uma dança negro-portuguesa (2007)
- A Música Popular que Surge na Era da Revolução (2009)
- Música popular: do gramofone ao rádio e TV (2014)
- Festa de Negro em Devoção de Branco (2012)
- Pequena História da Música Popular (2012)
- Música e Cultura Popular: Vários Escritos sobre um Tema em Comum (2017)
- Primeiras Lições de Samba e outras mais (2018)
