= Choro das 3 =

Brazilian instrumental music group

- Origin: São Paulo Brazil
- Genres: choro
- Instruments: Mandolin, Transversal Flute, Seven String Guitar and Pandeiro.
- Years active: 2002—present
- Labels: Macolé
- Members: Corina, Elisa, Lia
- Website: Choro das 3

Choro das 3 is a three-sister Brazilian instrumental music group, which plays a style known as Choro (pronounced Shoro). Corina (transversal flute), Elisa (mandolin, piano and clarinet) and Lia (7 string guitar) started to perform as a group in 2002, together with their late father, Eduardo. Eduardo used to play the pandeiro and percussion. In their first album, they also had the participation of Adriano Andrade, playing the cavaquinho.

The group has released 11 albums in Brazil, mixing classic Choro pieces with new ones.

== History ==
The beginning of the group is related to an album by Altamiro Carrilho, to which the older of the three sisters, Corina, heard when she was still a child. It was the inspiration from Carrilho's songs that led Corina to decide to study the recorder. One year later she began her studies on the transverse flute. Corina's sisters followed her inclination towards music and their father, Eduardo, supported them, by taking them to the city of São Paulo on weekends to listen to the "Rodas de Choro" (choro ensemble). The group "Choro das 3" was formed in 2002, when the girls were still very young (Corina was 14, Lia was 12 and Elisa was only 9 years old).

In 2003 they won the 1st Adoniran Barbosa Music Festival, a contest among every school in the Brazilian state of São Paulo.

In 2008 they released by Som Livre their first CD, called Meu Brasil Brasileiro. This album was recorded, produced and mixed by the Choro das 3 musicians in their own studio. They mixed in the tracks some classic choro music such as Aquarela do Brasil, Carinhoso and Tico-tico no fubá, and also new songs such as Bolinha de Gude, written by Elisa. Another song worth mentioning is Alla Turca, by Mozart but adapted to the choro style in this album. The work Meu Brasil Brasileiro rendered the group the award Premio de Melhor Grupo de Música Popular de 2008 (Best Popular Music of 2008 Award), by the Paulista Association of Critics of Art. In around 50 years of this award, it was the first time it was given to a group of instrumental music.

In 2012 Choro das 3 released the album Escorregando, the first one produced by the Macolé label. The title refers to a song of the same name written by Ernesto Nazareth, who was an important musician of Brazil. Besides Nazareth, Escorregando brings songs written by other great names, such as Chiquinha Gonzaga, Tia Amélia, Anacleto de Medeiros and Paulino Sacramento. The album also includes the song Assobiando (whistling), composed by Elisa. It's with Escorregando that Choro das 3 starts its international career, going to France to play at the Festival Internacional de Mandolines of Lunel. Collaborated with the recordings of Escorregando the following Brazilian musicians: Pacheco, Toninho Gallani, Arnaldinho, Joãozinho, Sérgio Ribeiro, Rosa Garbim, José V. de Aragão, Barão do pandeiro e Sérgio Ribeiro.

In the following year, 2013, Choro das 3 releases the new album Boas Novas, this time bringing only brand new songs. Besides the 4 songs written by the three sisters, they incorporated works by these other Brazilian composers: Paulo Costa (Pacco), Paulo Fasanaro, Pacheco, Gallani, Arnaldinho, Zé Barbeiro e Fernando Brandão. The following musicians participated in the recordings: Arnaldinho, José V. de Aragão, Pacheco, Ângelo Mauro, Renato Cardoso, Rosa Garbim e Diego Garbim.

The work started with Boas Novas finds its direct continuity in the next album, Boca de Goiaba, released in 2014. This new work follows the idea of the previous one, bringing new works and inviting many musicians to give the songs more complex arrangements. The novelty with Boca de Goiaba is some space to the influence of other rhythms, as in the tracks Teiú and Boca de Goiaba (which shows, respectively, the influence of the Brazilian rhythms known as baião and frevo). Traditional compositions are also present, such as Minha Primeira Valsa (My First Waltz) and Dança Russa (Russian Dance). As has been the operating mode of Choro das 3, the album Boca de Goiaba was first release in the United States and only when the group went back to Brazil it was released in their home country. The first Brazilian show occurred in the CBB, Brazilian British Centre, in São Paulo city. In the Boca de Goiaba album, 8 of the tracks are works by the composers Pacheco, Paulo Fasanaro and Fernando Brandão.

The 2014 tour in the USA was also important because it gave Elisa the opportunity to compose songs for her first solo work, an album called Dias de Verão (Summerdays), also produced by Macolé.

In 2015 Choro das 3 releases the album Pé de Choro during the USA tour. In November of the same year they come back to Brazil and released the album with the traditional concert at the CBB. This new album brings 4 songs written by the sisters, 4 works by Pacheco and 5 by Paulo Fasanaro. This time they had the collaboration of the following Brazilian musicians: Pacheco, Conrado Bruno de Oliveira, Arnaldinho, Thadeu Romano, Stanley Carvalho, Gustavo Mosca, Renato Cardoso, Carlos Martin, Giselly Maldonado, Guilherme Cendrelli, Isaias Alves e Raphael Sampaio. It is the first time two foreigners also play some songs in the album: Ted Falcon (from USA) plays violin in the track "George, o grilo", and Ilya Portnov (Russia) plays diatonic harmônica in the track "Pé de Frango".

Eduardo died on June 11, 2021, from the COVID-19 pandemic.

== Albums ==
2008	Meu Brasil Brasileiro
2012	Escorregando
2013	Boas Novas
2014	Boca de Goiaba
2015	Pé de Choro
2016	Impressões
2018	Viajantes

== International tours ==
2012	France	Festival Mandolines de Lunel
2013	USA	Boas Novas release
2014	USA	Boca de Goiaba release
2015	USA	Pé de Choro release

== Important shows ==
The Choro das 3 group has played in important events, such as the Reveillon in São Paulo (for an audience of more than 1 million people), and for important Brazilian politicians, such as President Fernando Henrique Cardoso, President Lula, Governor José Serra and Governor Geraldo Alckmin.

== Awards ==
Choro das 3 won the Prêmio Adoniran Barbosa in 2003, among every other public school in the São Paulo State, Brazil.

In 2008 Choro das 3 was awarded the Best Group of Popular Music according to the Paulista Association of Critics of Art. In 50 years of this award, it was the first time a group of instrumental music won.

== See also ==
- Choro
- Corina Meyer Ferreira
- Elisa Meyer Ferreira
- Lia Meyer Ferreira
