= Chiquinha Gonzaga (TV series) =

- Created by: Lauro César Muniz; Marcílio Moraes
- Starring: Regina Duarte; Carlos Alberto Riccelli; Susana Vieira; Gabriela Duarte; Marcelo Novaes
- Country of origin: Brazil
- Original language: Portuguese
- No. of episodes: 38

Original release
- Network: Rede Globo
- Release: January 12 – March 19, 1999

Chiquinha Gonzaga is a 1999 Brazilian miniseries.

Written by Lauro César Muniz and Marcílio Moraes, based on the life of the teacher and composer Francisca Edwiges Neves Gonzaga, directed by Jayme Monjardim, Luiz Armando Queiroz and Marcelo Travesso.

== Cast ==
In order of the opening of the miniseries

Regina Duarte	Chiquinha Gonzaga (second phase)
Carlos Alberto Riccelli	João Batista de Carvalho
Gabriela Duarte	Chiquinha Gonzaga (first phase)

=== First phase ===
- In order of the opening of the miniseries

Actor	Character
Danielle Winits	Suzette (young)
Norton Nascimento	Joaquim Callado
Tânia Bondezan	Maria Isabel
Solange Couto	Rosa
Christiana Guinle	Aimée
Haroldo Costa	Raimundo
Marcelo Mansfield	Arnaud
Guilherme Piva	Carlos
Fábio Junqueira	Joãozinho
Adriana Lessa	Feliciana
Jorge Maia	Zé da Bica
Luciana Faria	Nara
Charles Myara	Saldanha
Sérgio Loroza	Vassoura
Gottsha	Dalva
Rodrigo Mendonça	José
Fernanda Azevedo	Júlia
Ludmila Rosa	Marilda
Eduardo Caldas	Juca (child)
Paula Santoro	Eliane
Guilherme Bernard	Pedro
Bruno Telles	João Gualberto (child)
Felipe Brito	Zé Carlos (child)
Larissa Queiroz	Maria do Patrocínio (child)

Special participations

Actor	Character
Ângela Leal	Celeste
Antônio Petrin	João Castello
Sebastião Vasconcelos	Cônego Trindade
Chica Xavier	Inácia
Zezé Motta	Conceição

Guest actor

Actor	Character
Odilon Wagner	Major Basileu

Marcello Novaes as Jacinto

=== Second phase ===
- In order of the opening of the miniseries

Actor	Character
Norton Nascimento	Joaquim Callado
Tânia Bondezan	Maria Isabel
Solange Couto	Rosa
Christiana Guinle	Aimée
Caio Blat	Joãozinho (young)
Paulo Betti	Carlos Gomes
Antônio Calloni	Lopes Trovão
Lavínia Vlasak	Marie de Paris
Carla Regina	Alice
Christine Fernandes	Alzira
Bel Kutner	Maria Gonzaga do Amaral
Maurício Gonçalves	José do Patrocínio
Haroldo Costa	Raimundo
Cláudia Lira	Suzana
Fernanda Muniz	Mariana
Daniela Escobar	Amélia
Murilo Rosa	Amadeu
Dira Paes	Vitalina
Ana Paula Tabalipa	Ritoca
Marcelo Mansfield	Arnaud
Fábio Junqueira	Joãozinho
Antônio Grassi	Manuel
Chica Xavier	Inácia
Emílio Orciollo Netto	Jorge
Neco Villa Lobos	Castellinho
Caio Junqueira	João Gualberto
Milton Gonçalves	Henrique Alves de Mesquita
Clarisse Abujamra	Marina
Guilherme Piva	Carlos
Adriana Lessa	Feliciana
Maria Ceiça	Divina
Carlos Casagrande	Carlinhos
Stella Rodrigues	Geneviève
Jorge Maia	Zé da Bica
Sérgio Loroza	Vassoura
Lara Córdula	Maria da Cacimba
Juliana Monjardim	Emília

Guest actors

Actor	Character
Odilon Wagner	Major Basileu
Taumaturgo Ferreira	Paula Ney
Flávio Migliaccio	Vaga-Lume
Marcello Novaes	Jacinto

Guest actresses

Actor	Character
Vera Holtz	Dona Ló
Ângela Leal	Celeste
Zezé Motta	Conceição

Susana Vieira as Suzette

== International Exhibition ==
Chiquinha Gonzaga was sold to countries such as Chile, Ivory Coast, Ecuador, France, Honduras, Mauritius, Mali, Poland, Portugal, Dominican Republic, Russia, Venezuela and Vietnam.
