= Samba (Brazilian dance) =

Dance of Afro-Brazilian origin

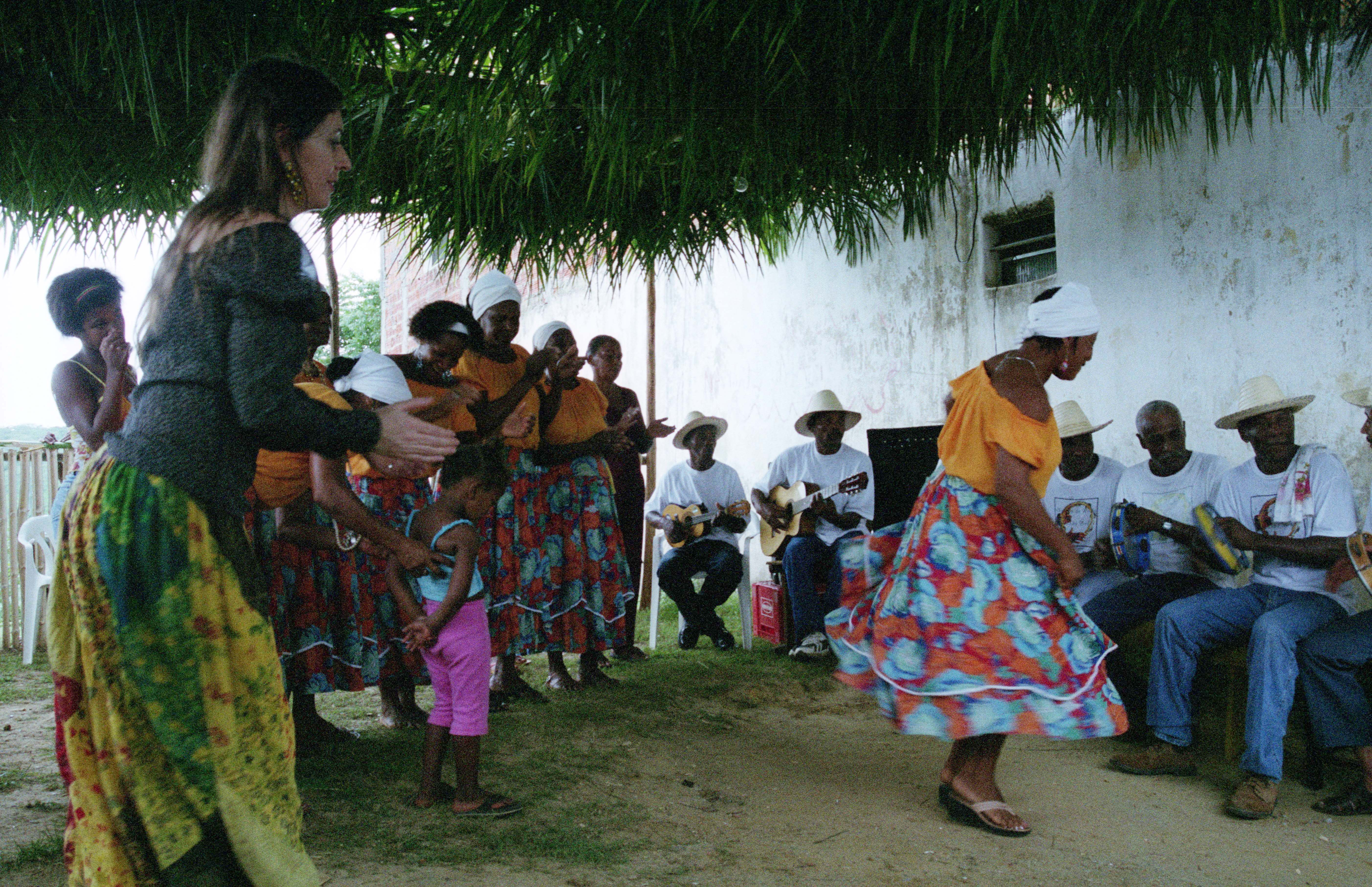
- Samba de roda dancers, 2004
- Genre: Samba
- Instruments: Samba drums; atabaque; tanta; repique-de-mao; pandeiro
- Origin: Afro-Brazilian, Bahia.

Samba is a type of Afro-Brazilian music and dance traditions that is characterized by a 2 by 4 time rhythm and lively movements, danced to samba music. This type of dance typically features fast footwork, rhythmic hip movements, and a swaying or bouncing motion that reflects the syncopated rhythms of the music. Samba may be performed solo, in pairs, or in group formations depending on the style. It developed in Brazil through cultural exchanges between Africans, Indigenous peoples, and Europeans during the 19th century. It originated primarily in Bahia, Brazil among Afro-descendant communities and later expanded through migration to Rio de Janeiro, Brazil. The term "samba" originally referred to any of several Latin duet dances with origins from the Congo and Angola. Today samba is the most prevalent dance form in Brazil, and reaches the height of its importance during the festival of Carnaval. Rather than one single dance, samba is a set of dances, and no one dance can be claimed with certainty as the "original" Samba style.

Today, samba includes regional styles and practices that are significant to community in Brazil, while also influencing global commercial entertainment and popular culture, such as Brazilian Entertainment shows like Samba Brazil Entertainment, which is the most popular Samba show around the world. Afro-Brazilian musicians, dancers, and religious communities are crucial to its preservation.

== Samba de Roda ==
Samba de Roda of the Recôncavo of Bahia
- UNESCO Intangible Cultural Heritage
- Country: Brazil
- Reference: 00101
- Region: Latin America and the Caribbean

Inscription history
- Inscription: 2008 (3rd session)
- List: Representative

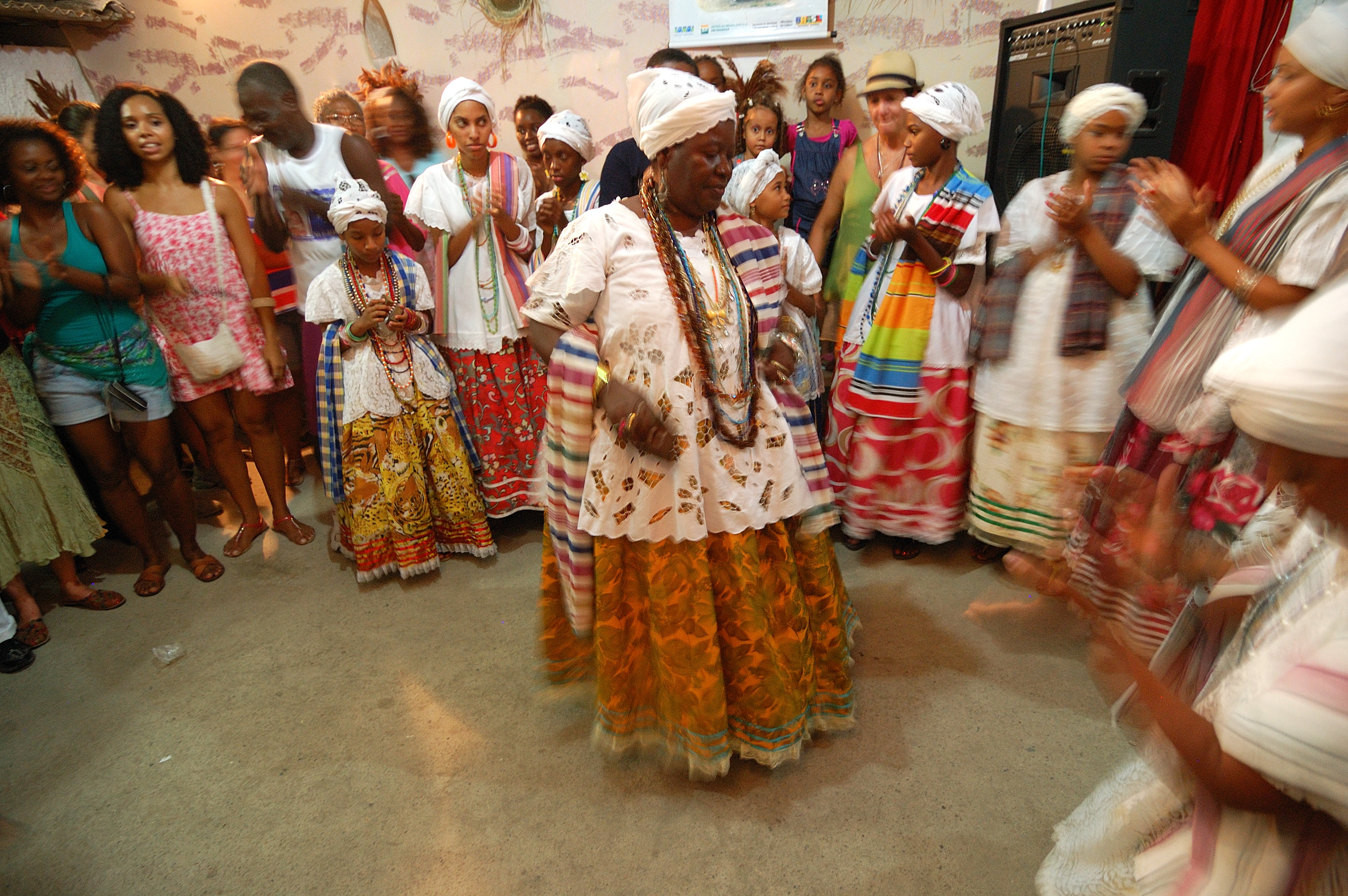
Samba de roda performed in a circle by women.

Samba de Roda (Samba of the roda") is a traditional Afro-Brazilian dance that developed in Brazil’s Bahia’s Recôncavo region during the late 19th century. This Samba is made up of African-derived circle dance traditions such as batuque and caxambu and was performed originally as informal fun after a Candomblé ceremony, using the same percussion instruments used during the religious ceremony. The typical drum is the atabaque; drummers improvise variations and elaborations on common patterns, accompanied typically by singing and clapping as well as dancing. One of the most typical features of the dance is the umbigada, where one dancer invites another into the circle's center.

The term "Samba" encompassed many different rhythms, tunes, drumming and dances of various periods and areas of the Brazilian territory. It appeared in the state of Bahia, more specifically in the region of Recôncavo in Brazil, during the 17th century.

Because all drumming and dance was generalized by Portuguese colonizers as "samba", it is difficult to attribute it to one distinct heritage. However, the most universally recognized cultural origin of Samba is Lundu, a rhythm that was brought to Brazil by the Bantu slaves from Africa. Lundu reveals, in a way, the blend of black (slaves) and white (Portuguese) and indigenous cultures. When the African slaves where imported, it was named the "semba" and with the introduction of the Arabic Pandeiro (tambourine), brought into the Roda by the Portuguese, the "Samba" was molded into the form of dance it is now.

In the indigenous language, "samba" means roda de dança, or a circle to dance since the indigenous peoples danced in celebration on many occasions, such as the celebration of popular Catholic festivals, Amerindian or Afro-Brazilian religious ceremonies, but was also practiced at random.

The factor that frequently draws the attention of most people to the rhythm is the unusually-accented (syncopated) beat. The absent beat is the strongest characteristic of Samba prompting the listener to dance to fill the gap with her/his body movements. This syncopated rhythm is also an indication of Black resistance against cultural assimilation. The Samba of Roda has been considered an expression of freedom and identity of the underprivileged peoples and shows their liberation in Afro-Brazilian communities.

Samba de Roda has significantly waned during the twentieth century due to economic decline and increased poverty in the region. The effects of mass media and competition from popular modern music have also devalued this tradition among the younger generation. Even with these challenges, Samba de Roda has remained as a significant way of cultural expression in Bahia and has influenced urban samba styles in Rio de Janeiro and other regions of Brazil.

== Etymology ==
One of the earliest documented references to "samba" was in Pernambuco magazine's O Carapuceiro, in February 1838. Father Miguel Lopes Gama of Sacramento wrote an article arguing against what he called "the samba d'almocreve", which was a type of dance drama popular with black people of that time. Written sources from the mid-19th century also reference samba as a popular form of expression among Black populations in Bahia and Pernambuco.

According to Hiram Araújo da Costa, over the centuries, the festival of dances of slaves in Bahia were called samba. Researchers have also identified connections to Central African languages, where semba refers to a gesture used in circle dances. Samba de Roda was the main form of circle dance, provenient from the Candomblé Afro-Brazilian Tradition.

During the mid-19th century, the word referred to several types of music made by enslaved Africans. Samba further developed specific characteristics in each Brazilian state, not only due to the diversity of tribes of African immigrants, but also because of the distinctive cultures each region embodied. Some of these popular dances were known as Candomblé, Catêrêtê, Caxambú, Choradinho, Côco-inchádo, Cocumbí, Córta-jáca, Cururú, Furrundú.

== Styles ==
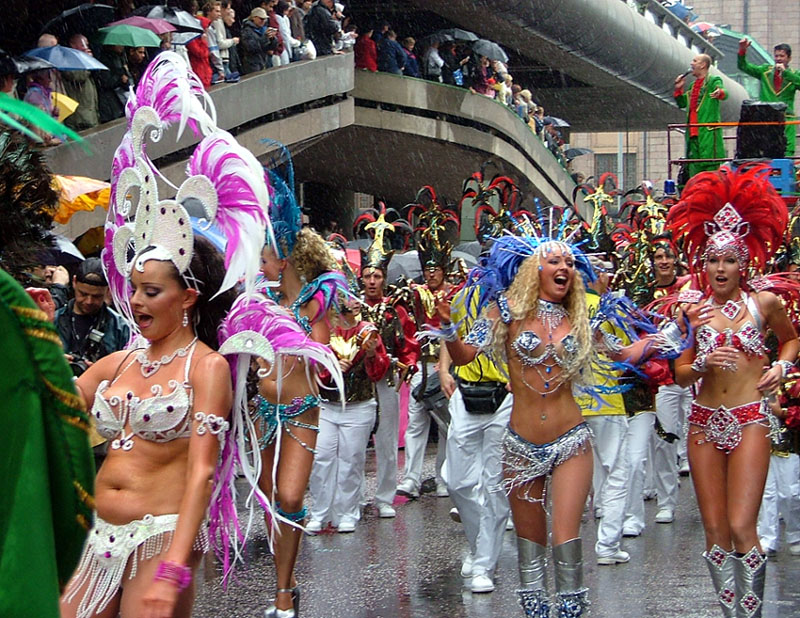
Samba dancers pictured in the Helsinki Samba Carnaval in 2004, where heavy rain and low temperatures did not dampen the spirits of the dancers.

=== Samba no pé ===
Samba no pé (literally, "samba in the foot") is a solo dance that is commonly danced impromptu when samba music is played. The basic movement involves a straight body and a bending of one knee at a time. The feet move very slightly - only a few inches at a time. The rhythm is 2/4, with 3 steps per measure. It can be thought of as a step-ball-change. It can be described calling it and-a-one, and-a-two, then back to one. The basic movement is the same to either side, where one foot moves to the outside lifting up just before the first beat (i.e. the right leg moves slightly to the right) and leg is kept as straight as a pole. The other foot moves slightly towards the front, and closer to the first foot. The second leg bends lightly at the knee so that the left side of the hip lowers and the right side appears to move higher. The weight is shifted to this inside foot briefly for the next "and-a", then shifted back to the outside foot on the "two", and the same series of actions is repeated towards the other side.

The dance simply follows the beat of the music and can go from average pace to very fast. Men dance with the whole foot on the ground while women, often wearing heels, dance just on the balls of the foot. Professionals may change the steps slightly, taking 4 steps per measure instead of 3, and often add various arm movements depending on the mood of the music.

There are also regional forms of the dance in Brazil where the essential steps are the same, but because of a change in the accent of the music people will dance similar movements to the slightly changed accents. For instance, in Bahia the girls tend to dance tilting their legs towards the outside instead of keeping their knees close to each other as in Rio de Janeiro.

This is the type of Samba one sees in the Brazilian Carnival parades and in other Samba carnivals over the world. This is also one of the most common type of samba dancing in Brazil.

=== Samba de Gafieira ===
Samba de Gafieira is a partner dance considerably different from the Ballroom Samba. It appeared in the 1940s and it gets its name from the gafieira, popular urban nightclubs of Rio de Janeiro at that time.

The dance derived from the Maxixe and followed the arrival of the Choro (another samba musical style). It left most of the Maxixe's Polka elements behind but maintained the entwined leg movements of the Argentine tango, although adopting a more relaxed posture than the latter. Many see this form of Samba as a combination of Waltz and Tango. Several Brazilian dance studios use elements and techniques from these two dances to teach Samba de Gafieira steps and dance routines.

=== Samba Pagode ===
Samba Pagode is a Samba partner dance that resembles the Samba de Gafieira but tends to be more intimate. The literal meaning of the Portuguese word "pagode" translates to "fun" or "merrymaking". The word is also utilized to refer to an informal gathering of samba dancers along with their accompanying music.

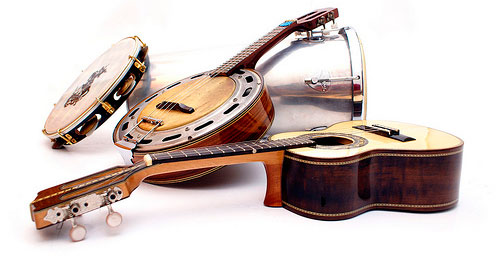
The three instruments: the tanta, the repique-de-mao, and the pandeiro typically used in Samba Pagode performances.

A key feature of Samba Pagode is its rhythmic texture created with a variety of beats. It became a dance style after the appearance of the Pagode style of music, which originated in the Brazilian city of São Paulo. The pagode style utilizes three specific percussion instruments: the tanta, the repique-de-mao, and the pandeiro. All three instruments are played by hand, which lends to creating a softer, more intimate sound than the batucada Samba performed by many Samba schools in Brazil. Pagode-like events have dated back to the late 19th and early 20th centuries, with the emergence of urban Samba in Rio de Janeiro.

=== Samba Axé ===
Samba Axé is a solo dance that started in 1992 during the Brazilian Carnival season in Bahia when the Axé rhythm replaced the Lambada. For years it became the major type of dance for the North east of Brazil during the holiday months. The dance is completely choreographed and the movements tend to mimic the lyrics. It is very energetic and mixes elements of Samba no pé and aerobics and because of the lyrics, which are made for entertainment, the dance generally has some sort of ludic element.

Several Axé music groups such as "É o Tchan" have as part of their marketing strategy to always release a choreography together with every one of their songs; therefore, Samba Axé is an ever-changing genre with no set of steps, routines or basic step.

=== Samba-reggae ===
Samba-reggae is a mix of reggae beats created by Samba drums. It is found in popular songs by the artist Daniela Mercury, who introduced the rhythm to the world with songs like "Sol da Liberdade" "O Reggae E O Mar" and "Perola Negra". Samba Reggae is a popular samba style in Bahia, with many followers in various parts of Brazil.

Samba-reggae has birthed a style of African-influenced dance which has been obtained from the styles of Afro-Brazilian and candomble dance. Within social settings, samba-reggae dances are often performed in a follow-the-leader manner, with a small number of advanced dancers initiating steps in a line in front of the crowd, and then the whole crowd subsequently following along. The percussionists of samba-reggae often dance while playing their drums as well. The third- and fourth drummers, known as surdos perform short choreographies, utilizing mallets to emphasize sharp arm movements. The fundos (the first and second surdos at the lead) often take center stage to showcase elaborate, deft mallet lifts and throws, and also toss their drums high overhead.

=== Samba-rock ===
Samba-rock is a playful form of the samba that originates from São Paulo. It is a form of Latin nightclub dance.

One of Samba-rock's first dance instructors, Mestre Ataliba, describes the essence of the dance style. "Dance wise, samba rock is about relaxation and concentration, all at once... It blends the African 'ginga' (body flow from Capoeira), which is present at the feet and the hips, and the European reference of the ballroom etiquette. We can dance it to the sound of Rita Pavone, samba pagode, reggae, R&B. It really embraces every music culture".

=== Bossa nova ===
A relaxed style of Brazilian music and dance that fuses samba rhythms with jazz influences, known for its soft sophisticated vocal rhythms and improvisations, complex harmonies, and smooth, melodic feel.

=== Partido alto ===
It is a traditional Afro-Brazilian style of samba known for its improvisational structure and it has distinct rhythmic pattern used in samba and jazz.

=== Samba-canção ===
Known as "samba-song," it is a slow-paced samba rhythm.

== Urbanization of Samba ==
During the early 20th century, African migration from Bahia to Rio de Janeiro contributed to the emergence of urban samba styles. Afro-Brazilian musicians in Rio de Janeiro created new ensembles and performance practices that gained visibility and recognition in Brazil’s Carnival celebrations. Multiple recorded samba songs and radio performances throughout the 1920s played a role in Samba’s national and commercial expansion. Photographs and sheet music from the 1920s were also used as forms of documentation showing samba musicians and artists participating in social gatherings in Rio de Janeiro. This evolution shows how samba moved from small and local neighborhoods into the public part of city life. As Afro-Brazilian people moved into Rio's working-class areas, they adjusted their music and social traditions to fit their new urban environment. This created a different and unique blend of traditional rhythms mixed with new city sounds and performance spaces to expand the variants of Samba. Samba became more professional as schools and organized groups started to set standards for the music and dancing seen during Carnival. At the same time, the rise of technology like the radio and records helped make samba a national favorite across Brazil. These platforms helped samba reach more people, but they also tended to favor "cleaner" versions of the music that were easier to sell. This changed the way the public looked at the genre. Samba stopped being seen as a marginalized tradition and started being viewed as the main symbol of Brazilian identity. However, turning samba into a popular business and national symbol caused some friction. While Samba gained more respect over time, the government and wealthy groups often tried to control the music, which created many different variants of Samba that we see today. While this was happening, traditional Samba remained within original communities to express themselves and stand up for their culture within the city.

== Cultural and global influence ==
Samba has become recognized as part of Brazil’s national culture from throughout the late 19th century to today. With the expansion of radio and recording industries samba has transitioned from an Afro-Brazilian practice associated in communities to a widely disseminated symbol of Brazilian national culture. This transformation was closely tied to state cultural policies and mass media, which promoted samba as representative of a unified Brazilian identity. Academic studies emphasize that samba has historically functioned both as a symbol of national cohesion and as a site of resistance rooted in Afro-Brazilian social and religious traditions. As an Afro-Brazilian expressive form, it reflects negotiations surrounding race, class, and cultural ownership in Brazil. These dynamics highlight the tension between how samba is officially presented and how it is actually experienced in the communities that created it. While state institutions and cultural industries have historically promoted samba as a unified symbol of Brazilian national identity, this representation has often obscured its origins in Afro-Brazilian communities, particularly among formerly enslaved and working-class populations in urban areas such as Rio de Janeiro. Samba was institutionalized through radio, tourism, media, and organized Carnival performances. These portrayed selective adaptation of the genre to align with dominant social norms, minimizing elements associated with true Afro-Brazilian religious practices and cultural expression. The version of samba presented in official and global contexts differ significantly from the forms practiced within local communities. Globalization has influenced how samba is performed, represented, the authenticity, and the selective portrayal of how Brazilian culture is represented to international audiences.

== See also ==
- Carioca (dance)
- Samba school
