= Nicolau Tolentino de Almeida =

Portuguese writer (1740–1811)

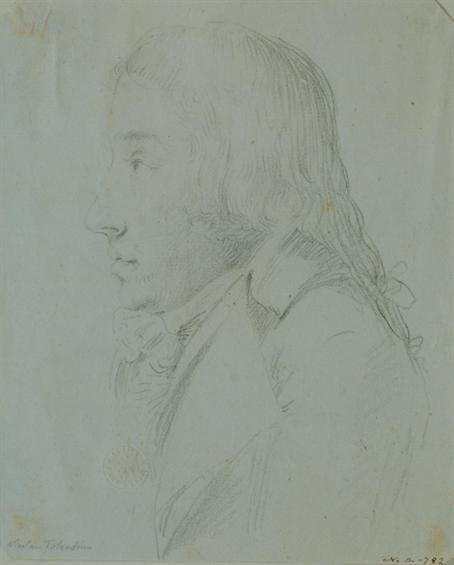
Likely portrait by Giuseppe Troni (undated)

Nicolau Tolentino de Almeida (10 September 1740 – 23 June 1811), from Lisbon, was the foremost Portuguese satirical poet of the 18th century. Beginning at age 20, Tolentino studied law for three years at the University of Coimbra; he then ended those studies to teach rhetoric. He was sent to Lisbon in 1776 to fill a post, and was named professor of rhetoric a year later. His interests soon shifted once again, from teaching, to public office. He wrote against the Marquis of Pombal, and therefore gained the favor of Pombal's successor. He was awarded with a sinecure office in the royal administration. In 1790, he was honored with the title of knight of the royal family.

== Literary work ==
The accumulated works of Tolentino de Almeida include sonnets, odes, memorials and satires, among other genres. In 1801 the poet collected his works into one volume, titled Obras poéticas, published by the state. After his death, some more complete collections were published, including texts unknown until then.

=== Satire ===
Tolentino's satire, which made him particularly known, and set him apart from his contemporaries (in fact, he did not belong to any of the Arcádian literary societies, but was one of the "Dissidents"), is directed at the pettiness of tradition, the fakery of appearances, and the senselessness of certain social groups and behaviors, with a humor that was both ironic and amusing. The poet includes himself amongst the cooperators of this mediocrity, resigning himself to his own small-mindedness—some of his poems are homages to great people of the time, whose protection and help he needed. Tolentino presents himself as living in misery, and declares himself, both ironically and conscientiously, as a character in the human comedy that he caricatured.

=== Characteristics ===
From the point of view of style, the poet's work is marked by his simplicity, distant from the grandiloquence and the metrical structure of the neoclassic poets. His verses approach the popular forms, and his tone approaches a colloquialism, which contributes to the effect of denunciation of everyday vices, of ordinary episodes.

=== Legacy ===
He is considered by many as one of the great literary figures of the Portuguese 18th century, as well as one of the greatest national satirists.

Tolentino made the earliest known literary reference to "Brazilian modinha" in 1779, most likely in reference to Domingos Caldas Barbosa's music. In addition, one of his characters in a farce from 1786—A rabugem das velhas [The bad-tempered old women]—mentions "this new modinha that's been invented now", which sends her grandmother into a rage, eulogizing the past.

== Works ==
- Tolentino de Almeida, Nicolau (1801). Obras poéticas [Poetical Works]. Lisbon: Regia Officina Typografica.
