= Norton Nascimento =

Brazilian actor (1962–2007)

- Born: 4 January 1962; Belém, Pará
- Died: 21 December 2007 (aged 45); São Paulo, SP
- Occupation: Actor
- Spouse: Kelly Cândia (2002–2007)

Norton Nascimento (4 January 1962 – 21 December 2007) was a Brazilian actor.

== Personal life ==
Norton Nascimento was born in the city of Belém, capital of the state of Pará. His wife was actress Kelly Candia. He was a member of the Igreja Renascer em Cristo.

== Death ==
Nascimento had suffered several years of failing health, including a reported heart transplant in December 2003 due to an aortic aneurysm. He died in Beneficência Portuguesa de São Paulo hospital, aged 45, in São Paulo, Brazil, from heart failure due to lung problems.

== Filmography ==
=== Film credits ===
- 1995: Carlota Joaquina, Princess of Brazil – Fernando Leão
- 1998: Drama Urbano – Waldo
- 2000: Até que a Vida nos Separe – Pedro
- 2004: Araguaia – A Conspiração do Silêncio – Osvaldão

=== Television credits ===
- 1981: Os Imigrantes
- 1992: De Corpo e Alma
- 1992–1999: Você Decide – Dr. Dante / Italo
- 1993: Fera Ferida – Wotan
- 1993: Agosto – Chicão
- 1995: A Próxima Vítima – Sidney Noronha
- 1996: O Fim do Mundo – Frei Eusébio
- 1997: Malhação – Fausto
- 1999–2001: Sai de Baixo – Filipe
- 1999: Chiquinha Gonzaga – Joaquim Antônio da Silva Calado
- 2000: Aquarela do Brasil – Bemol
- 2001: Brava Gente – Marcelo
- 2001: A Padroeira – Zacarias
- 2001: As Filhas da Mãe – Investigador Marcelo
- 2003: Sítio do Picapau Amarelo – Maldoror
- 2006: Papai Noel Existe (especial de fim de ano)
- 2007: Maria Esperança – Nocaute (Bento de Jesus) (final appearance)
