= Isto É Bom =

Single by Baiano
- Released: 1902
- Genre: Lundu
- Length: 3:58
- Label: Casa Edison labeled as Zonophone
- Songwriter: Xisto Bahia

"Isto É Bom" ("This Is Good") is a lundu written by Xisto Bahia and released by singer Baiano in 1902, through Casa Edison, labeled as Zonophone. This song is considered by many Brazilian music specialists as the first recorded song in Brazil.
