= Corta Jaca (samba step) =

Corta Jaca is a figure from the Bronze level syllabus of the ballroom Samba dance, danced in closed position.

It may also be used in other dances, such as Cumbia or Balboa.

== Description ==
The basic rhythm of the figure is Sqqqqqq. The leader takes a slow step forward with right foot (heel), and then steps forward/replace/back/replace/forward/replace. Steps forward are taken with "digging" the heel. Steps forward and back may be taken slightly sideways, then the "replace" steps are with slight slide leftwards. The follower's steps are opposite.

The figure may also involve gradual rotation. It may also be commenced from either foot, or either forward or back.

== See also ==
- Corta Jaca (ballroom Maxixe)
- Corta Jaca (disambiguation)
