= Drinking establishment =

Business serving alcoholic beverages

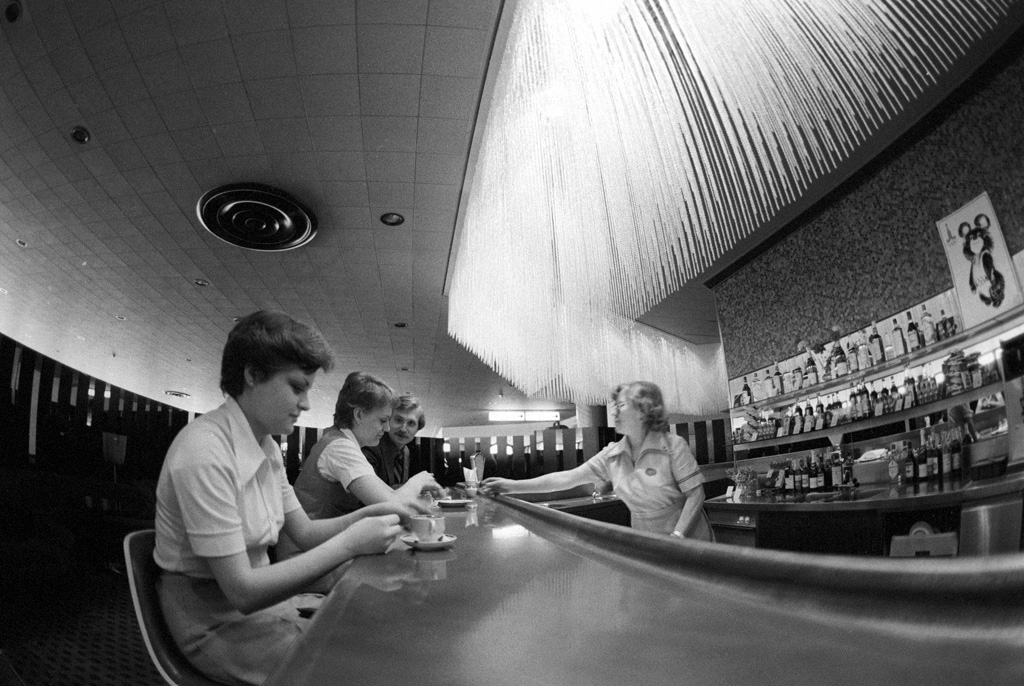
A bar at Sheremetyevo International Airport, July 1980

A drinking establishment is a business whose primary function is the serving of alcoholic beverages for consumption on the premises. Some establishments may also serve food, or have entertainment, but their main purpose is to serve alcoholic beverages. There are different types of drinking establishment ranging from seedy bars or nightclubs, sometimes termed "dive bars", to 5,000 seat beer halls and elegant places of entertainment for the elite. A public house, informally known as a "pub", is an establishment licensed to serve alcoholic drinks for consumption on the premises in countries and regions of British influence. Although the terms are increasingly used to refer to the same thing, there is a difference between pubs, bars, inns, taverns and lounges where alcohol is served commercially. A tavern or pot-house is, loosely, a place of business where people gather to drink alcoholic beverages and, more than likely, also be served food, though not licensed to put up guests. The word derives from the Latin taberna and the Greek ταβέρνα/taverna.

A brewpub is a pub or restaurant that brews beer on the premises. A beer hall (German: Bierpalast, Bierstube) is a large pub that specializes in beer. An Izakaya is a type of Japanese drinking establishment which also serves food to accompany the drinks. A speakeasy is an establishment that illegally sells alcoholic beverages.

== Bar ==
Types of bars range from seedy bars or nightclubs, sometimes termed "dive bars", to elegant places of entertainment for the elite. Many bars have a happy hour to encourage off-peak patronage. Bars that fill to capacity sometimes implement a cover charge during their peak hours. Such bars often feature entertainment, which may be a live band or a popular disc jockey. Bars provide stools or chairs that are placed at tables or counters for their patrons. Some bars have entertainment on a stage, such as a live band, comedians, go-go dancers, or strippers.

The term bar is derived from the specialized counter on which drinks are served. The "back bar" is a set of shelves of glasses and bottles behind that counter. In some establishments, the back bar is elaborately decorated with woodwork, etched glass, mirrors, and lights.

== Pub ==
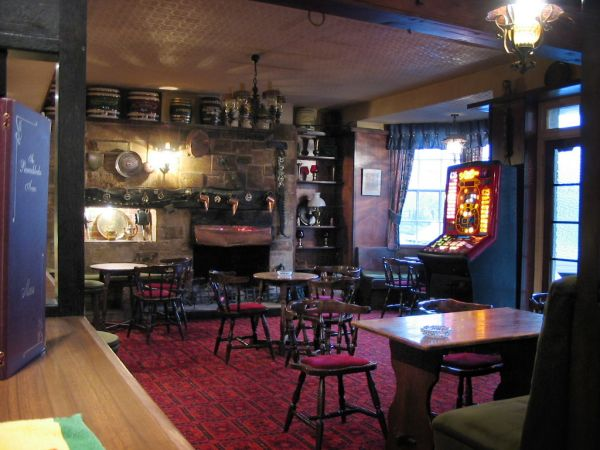
The interior of a typical English pub

A pub, archaically known as a "public house", is an establishment licensed to serve alcoholic drinks for consumption on the premises in countries and regions of British influence. Although the terms are increasingly used to refer to the same thing, there is a definite difference between pubs, bars, inns, taverns and lounges where alcohol is served commercially. A pub that offers lodging may be called an inn or (more recently) hotel in the United Kingdom. Today, many pubs in the UK, Canada and Australia with the word "inn" or "hotel" in their names no longer offer accommodation, and in some cases have never done so. Some pubs bear the name of "hotel" because they are in countries where stringent anti-drinking laws were once in force. In Scotland until 1976, only hotels could serve alcohol on Sundays. In Wales, an 1881 Act applied the same law until 1961 when local polls could lift such a ban in a district and in 1996 the last ban was lifted in Dwyfor. The need for such polls was removed by the Welsh Assembly in 2003.

There are approximately 53,500 public houses in the United Kingdom. In many places, especially in villages, a pub can be the focal point of the community, so there is concern that more pubs are closing down than new ones opening.

The history of pubs can be traced back to Roman taverns, through the Anglo-Saxon alehouse, to the development of the modern generally prevailing tied house system.

== Tavern ==
A tavern or pot-house is, loosely, a place of business where people gather to drink alcoholic beverages and, more than likely, also be served food, though not licensed to put up guests. The word derives from the Latin taberna and the Greek ταβέρνα/taverna, whose original meaning was a shed or workshop. The distinction of a tavern from an inn, bar or pub varies by location, in some places being identical and in others being distinguished by traditions or by legal license. In Renaissance England, a tavern was distinguished from a public ale house by dint of being run as a private enterprise, where drinkers were "guests" rather than members of the public.

== Brewpub ==
A brewpub is a pub or restaurant that brews beer on the premises. Some brewpubs, such as those in Germany, have been brewing traditionally on the premises for hundreds of years. Others, such as the Les 3 Brasseurs chain in France and Canada, and the various chains in North America, are modern restaurants.

== Beer hall ==
A beer hall (German: Bierpalast, Bierstube) is a large pub that specializes in beer. Bavaria's capital Munich is the city most associated with beer halls; almost every brewery in Munich operates a beer hall. The largest beer hall was the 5,000-seat Mathäser near the München Hauptbahnhof (Munich central train station) which has since been converted into a film theatre.

== Izakaya ==
An izakaya (居酒屋) is a type of Japanese drinking establishment which also serves food to accompany the drinks. The food is usually more substantial than that offered in other types of drinking establishments in Japan such as bars or snack bars.

== Beer garden ==
A beer garden (a loan translation from the German Biergarten) is an outdoor area in which beer, other drinks, and local food are served (see German cuisine). Beer gardens originated in Southern Germany (especially Bavaria) and are most common there. They are usually attached to a beer hall, pub, or restaurant. The term "beer garden" (Biergarten) has become a generic term for open-air establishments where beer is served. Many countries have such establishments. The characteristics of a traditional beer garden include trees, wooden benches, a gravel bed, and freshly prepared meals. Some modern beer gardens use plastic chairs, fast food, and other variations of the traditional beer garden. The largest traditional beer garden in the world is the Hirschgarten in Munich, which seats 8,000.

== Speakeasy ==
A speakeasy, also called a blind pig or blind tiger, is an establishment that illegally sells alcoholic beverages. Such establishments came into prominence in the United States during the Prohibition era (1920–1933, longer in some states). During that time, the sale, manufacture, and transportation (bootlegging) of alcoholic beverages was illegal throughout the United States.

Speakeasies largely disappeared after Prohibition was ended in 1933, and the term is now used to describe some retro style bars. Different names for speakeasies were created. The terms "blind pig" and "blind tiger" originated in the United States in the 19th century. These terms were applied to lower-class establishments that sold alcoholic beverages illegally, and they are still in use today. The operator of an establishment (such as a saloon or bar) would charge customers to see an attraction (such as an animal) and then serve a "complimentary" alcoholic beverage, thus circumventing the law. "Blind tiger" also referred to illegal drinking establishment in which the seller's identity was concealed. A drawer would open up in a wall, the patron drops in change, and then a drink is placed in the drawer.

Speakeasies were numerous and popular during the Prohibition years. Some of them were operated by people who were part of organized crime. Even though police and agents of the Bureau of Prohibition would often raid them and arrest their owners and patrons, they were so profitable that they continued to flourish. The poor quality bootleg liquor sold in speakeasies was responsible for a shift away from 19th century 'classic' cocktails, that celebrated the raw taste of the liquor (such as the Gin Cocktail, made with Genever (sweet) gin), to new cocktails aimed at masking the taste of rough moonshine.

== See also ==
- Boteco
- Botequim
- Cider house
- Juice bar
- List of bars
- Tea house
- Types of drinking establishments
