= Chiquinha Gonzaga =

Brazilian composer, pianist and conductor

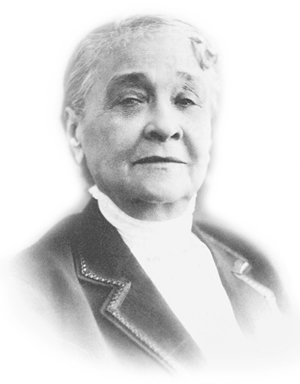
- Gonzaga at age 78
- Born: Francisca Edwiges Neves Gonzaga; October 17, 1847; Rio de Janeiro, Brazil
- Died: February 28, 1935 (aged 87); Rio de Janeiro, Brazil
- Occupations: Composer, Pianist, Conductor
- Notable work: Atraente, Ó Abre Alas, Forrobodó, Jurití
- Style: Choro, Polka, Samba, Brazilian tango, Marcha, Valsa
- Spouse: Jacinto Ribeiro do Amaral
- Parents: José Basileu Gonzaga (father); Rosa Maria Neves de Lima (mother)

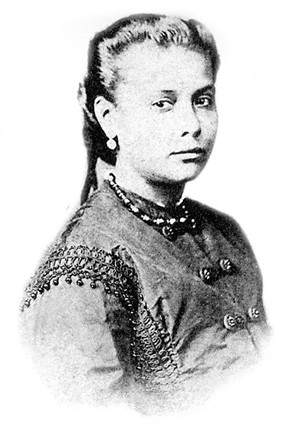
Chiquinha Gonzaga at age 18

Atraente
"Atraente", composed by Chiquinha Gonzaga, recorded by Pixinguinha (saxophone) and Benedito Lacerda (flute).

Francisca Edwiges Neves Gonzaga, better known as Chiquinha Gonzaga (Portuguese pronunciation: [ʃiˈkiɲɐ ɡõˈzaɡɐ]; October 17, 1847 – February 28, 1935) was a Brazilian composer, pianist and the first woman conductor in Brazil.

Chiquinha Gonzaga was the first pianist of "choro" and author of the first carnival march, "Ó Abre Alas" (1899). Her plays and operettas, such as Forrobodó and Jurití, were a great success with the public because they used elements of Brazilian popular culture of the time.

== Biography ==
=== Early life ===
Chiquinha Gonzaga was born in Rio de Janeiro, from a pardo mother and a wealthy white father – after she was born her father became a marshal. Her godfather was Luís Alves de Lima e Silva, Duke of Caxias. For her mother, a mestizo and poor woman, the birth of Chiquinha was very difficult, in part because of the risk that the father would not recognize the paternity of her daughter. Indeed, José Basileu, the military promising career, from a wealthy family, suffered from the pressure of his parents, who were against his marriage with Rosa. Despite these disagreements, he accepted the child as his daughter and married.

Like all girls of a military family in the 19th century, Chiquinha Gonzaga was very well educated. Her father, very strict with her education, prepared her for a successful future: a good marriage that would raise her to the category of "lady". She learned to read and write, do maths and primarily play the piano. Therefore, the music became her sole purpose in life. At age 11, she composed her first musical work, the song "Canção dos Pastores", in a Christmas celebration.

In Brazil in the late 19th century, women were often seen on a quasi role of slave; few dared to defy their parents and husbands; when that happened, they were quickly sent to reformatories and convents. However, since 1808 with the arrival of the Royal Family in Brazil, women began to circulate more in the streets, dancing in receptions, to come to parties at theater and opera.

Rio de Janeiro in those times was already turning into a metropolitan center, gradually growing according to the development of external trade. The usages and consumption were modified. The port of Rio de Janeiro became the financial and commercial center of the Empire, which were trading coffee, slaves and foreign goods that fascinated the new consumers. The city now had the appearance of a European city. Even with all these social changes, manners were not so advanced. For the young Chiquinha, nothing had changed: she always had to obey the orders of her father.

=== Marriage and family ===
In 1863, at age 16, Francisca married Jacinto Ribeiro do Amaral, a young man of 24 and an official of the Imperial Navy. Francisca had received the gift of a piano from her father, as a wedding gift. Jacinto do Amareal was chosen by her father to marry Chiquinha even though she had expressed her disagreement with this arranged marriage.

Unable to withstand the life on the ship where her husband served (and where he spent more time than with his family), his psychological and physical abuses and humiliation, because he did not agree that she would pursue a musical career, Chiquinha left her husband and asked for divorce, a scandal at the time. She took with her their eldest son, João Gualberto (born in 1864). Her husband, however, did not let Chiquinha take her younger children: their daughter, Maria do Patrocínio (born in 1865) and their other son, Hilário (born in 1867).

After leaving her husband, Chiquinha was “declared dead and of unpronounceable name” by her father.

In 1870, Chiquinha moved to Minas Gerais with the engineer João Batista de Carvalho, with whom she had a daughter, Maria Alice (born in 1876). As Chiquinha could not accept his extra-marital betrayals, she split and again lost a daughter. João Batista did not let Chiquinha keep Maria Alice.

In 1876, Chiquinha Gonzaga, 29 years old, lived in Rio de Janeiro with her eldest son, João Gualberto, to work as an independent musician and initiate her successful career as a pianist and composer.

In 1899, after decades dedicated mainly to her music, Chiquinha met João Batista Fernandes Lage, a young Portuguese musician. They fell in love but the age difference was too large and would cause more prejudice and suffering in the life of Chiquinha. She was 52 years old and João Batista Fernandes Lage was only 16. Chiquinha adopted him as a son in order to be able to live this great love. This decision was taken to avoid the scandals regarding her own children and the society of the time, and to not affect her brilliant career. For this reason also, Chiquinha and João Batista moved to Lisbon (Portugal) where they lived several years away from the acquaintances in Rio de Janeiro. At first, her children did not accept the couple, but soon they realized the importance of João Batista for Chiquinha's music and life. After a few years, the couple returned to Brazil without arousing any suspicions to be living as husband and wife. Chiquinha never admitted publicly her relationship with João Batista, which was only discovered after his death, through letters and photos of the couple.

She died in 1935, during the beginning of a new Carnival. She was buried in the cemetery of São Francisco de Paula, district of Catumbi, in Rio de Janeiro.

== Career ==
After separating from her husband, Chiquinha lived as an independent musician, playing piano in music instrument stores. She gave piano lessons to support her son João Gualberto, regardless of society critics because she was raising a child without a husband. She was devoted entirely to her music, which was very successful, as her career grew and she became very famous as a composer of polkas, waltzes, tangos and ditties. Chiquinha began to participate in balls and “chorões” reunions, normally reserved for men, where she met the flautist Joaquim Antônio da Silva Callado and started to play in his group, O Choro do Calado, being the first woman to play in this group.

The need to adjust the piano sound to popular taste are the reason of Chiquinha Gonzaga's glory to become the first popular composer of Brazil. During this time she composed her first success, the polka "Atraente", in 1877, “composed by the piano, as an improvisation, during a ‘choro’ meeting”. At that time, she was famous but highly criticized by the masculine society of her time. In 1884, she composed the waltz "Walkyria", considered one of her most beautiful waltzes.

After the success of her first printed composition, she decided to start to do vaudeville and revue. She composed the costume operetta "A Corte na Roça" in 1885. In 1911, her greatest success in the theater was the operetta "Forrobodó", that reached 1500 straight shows after the premiere - until today the best show of its kind in Brazil.

In 1900, Chiquinha meets the irreverent artist Nair de Tefé von Hoonholtz, the first woman cartoonist in the world, a bohemian woman from noble family, and they become great friends. Between 1902 and 1910, Chiquinha travelled through Europe, becoming particularly famous in Portugal, where she wrote songs for various authors.

Shortly after her return from Europe, her friend Nair de Tefé married the Brazilian president Hermes Rodrigues da Fonseca, becoming the first lady of Brazil. Chiquinha was invited by Nair de Tefé a few evenings at Catete Palace, the presidential palace, even against the will of Nair's family. Chiquinha was already very famous but very criticized by the society of her time. Once, in 1914, for the premiere of "Corta Jaca" at the presidential palace, the first lady joined Chiquinha on guitar, playing an excerpt from the song composed by the pianist. This episode was considered a scandal at the time, with public critics against the government, the life at the palace, the promotion and dissemination of music whose origins were in "vulgar" dances, contrary to the values of the aristocratic social elite. Playing Brazilian popular music in the palace of the Brazilian Government was regarded at the time as a violation of the protocol, which caused controversy in the upper echelons of society and politicians. After the end of his presidential term, Hermes da Fonseca and Nair de Tefé moved to France, where they remained for a long time. Because of this episode, Chiquinha and Nair ended up losing touch.

She was the composer of the famous operetta partition "Juriti" with Viriato Corrêa, in 1919.

In 1934, at age 87, she wrote her last composition, the opera "Maria".

Due to the popularity of her music, many people began to use her music and content without permission. Their abuse of her work as a musician led to Chiquinha founding the Brazilian Society of Theater Authors in 1917, which was the first society put into place to copyright and protect works by Brazilian artists.

By the end of her life, she composed music for 77 theater plays and was the author of about 2,000 compositions in different genres: waltzes, polkas, tangos, lundus, maxixes, fado, quadrilles, mazurkas, choros and serenades.

== Civic engagement ==
Due to her maternal origins and the many injustices experienced during her life, Chiquinha was a very active citizen and involved in all kinds of social movements that took place during her generation in Brazil, such as the abolition of slavery, with the Golden Law of 1888 and the proclamation of the Republic in 1889. Many times, she had a leading position in the suffragist movement.

== Tribute ==
On 17 October 2018, to commemorate what would have been her 171st birthday, Google released a Google Doodle celebrating her.

In 1999, a miniseries titled Chiquinha Gonzaga was released. It comprised 38 episodes, and was based on her life as a teacher and composer.

In the Passeio Público of Rio de Janeiro, there is a herm in her honor by the sculptor Honorius Peçanha. In May 2012, law 12624 was enacted establishing the National Day of Brazilian Popular Music, celebrated on the day of her birthday, October 17.

== See also ==
- Gaúcho, the most recorded tune by Chiquinha
- Chiquinha Gonzaga, TV series about Gonzaga
