= Maxixe (dance) =

Brazilian dance and music genre

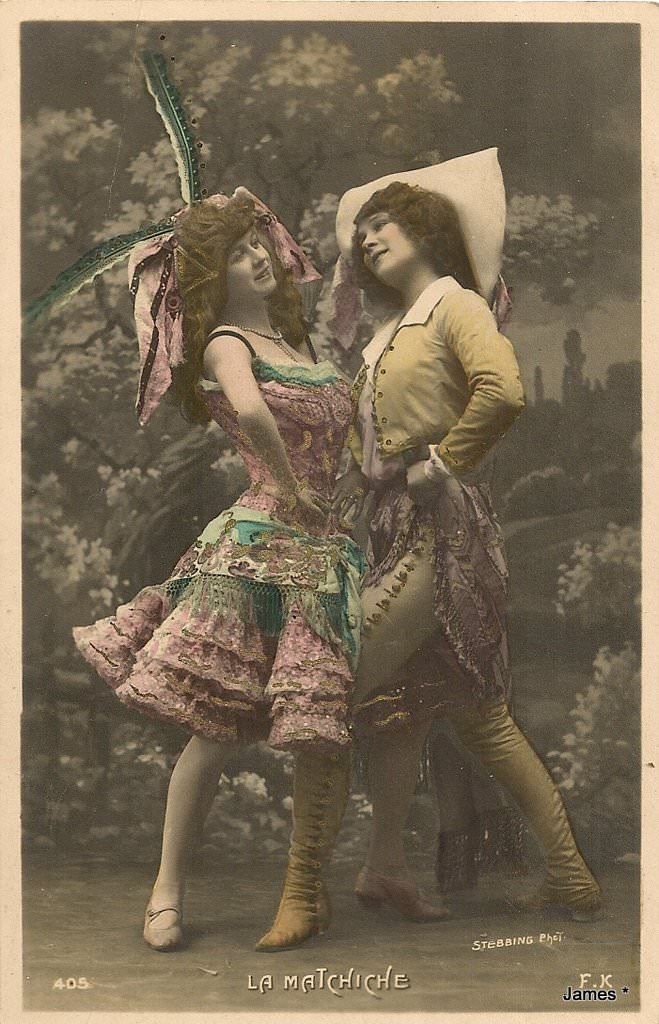

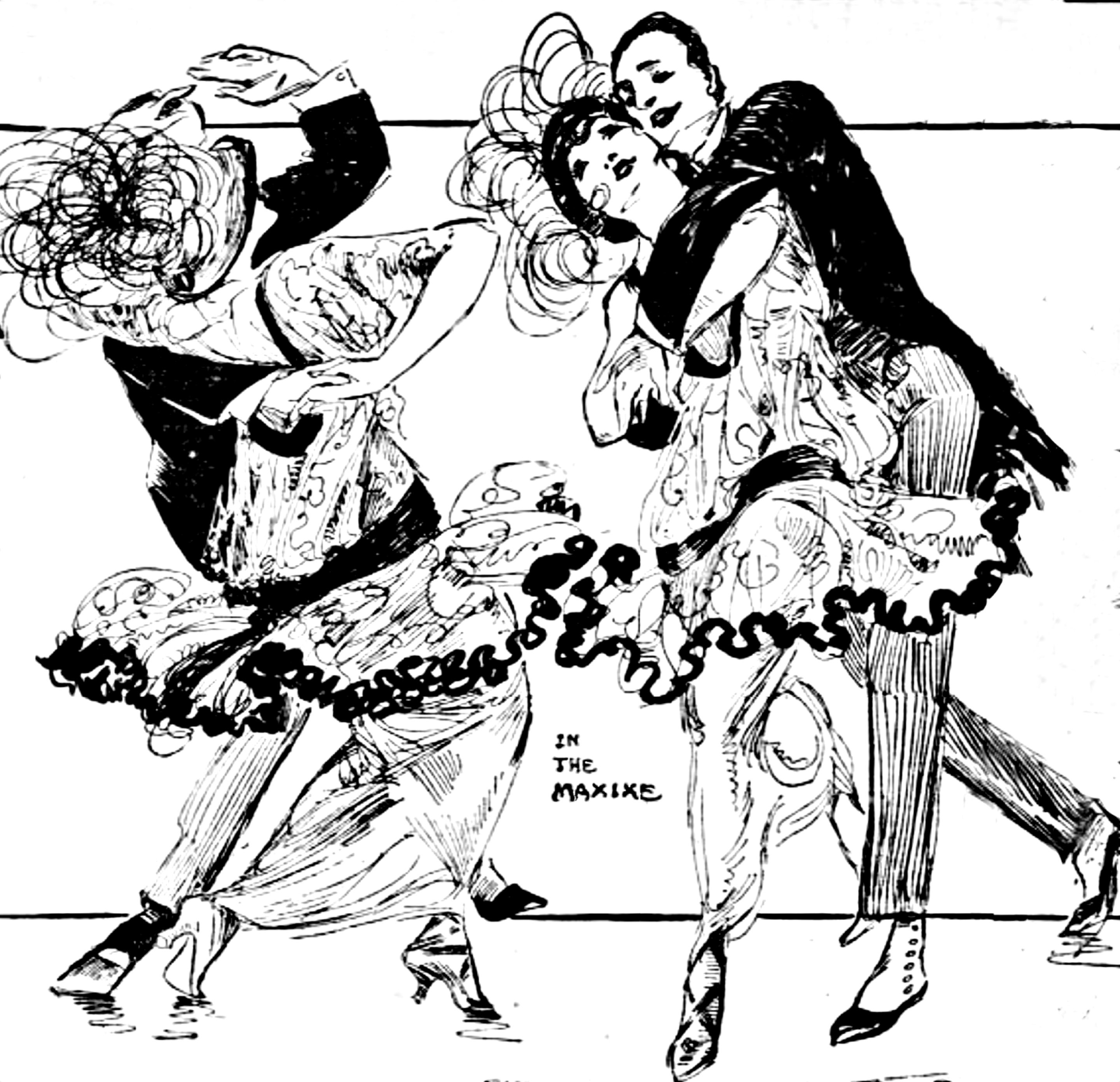
St. Louis journalist Marguerite Martyn sketched Irene and Vernon Castle dancing the maxixe in 1914.

The maxixe (Portuguese pronunciation: [maˈʃiʃi]), occasionally known as the Brazilian tango, is a dance, with its accompanying music (often played as a subgenre of choro), that originated in the Brazilian city of Rio de Janeiro in 1868, at about the same time as the tango was developing in neighbouring Argentina and Uruguay. It is a dance developed from Afro-Brazilian dances (mainly the lundu) and from European dances (mainly the polka).

Like the tango, the maxixe travelled to Europe and the United States in the early years of the 20th century.

Atraente
"Atraente", composed by Chiquinha Gonzaga, recorded by Pixinguinha (saxophone) and Benedito Lacerda (flute).

Cigana de Catumbi
"Cigana de Catumbi", composed by José Resende de Almeida, recorded by Orquestra Cícero in 1925.

Corta jaca
"Corta jaca", composed by Chiquinha Gonzaga and executed by the Grupo Chiquinha Gonzaga. Recorded in 1910-1912.

Escovado
"Escovado", composed and recorded (1907) by Ernesto Nazareth (piano).

Amapá
"Amapá" composed by Costa Júnior in 1901. Recorded by Dante Santoro (flute) in 1941.

The music was influenced by various other forms including the Spanish tango, lundu, polka and habanera, and is danced to a rapid 2/4 time. Pianist Ernesto Nazareth composed many Brazilian tangos; he was known for blending folk influences into his tangos, polkas and waltzes. He resisted using folk terms for his compositions; he preferred Brazilian Tango to maxixe.

The maxixe was one of the dances that contributed to samba dance styles (such as samba de gafieira) and lambada.

Vernon Castle said of the maxixe in his 1914 book Modern Dancing, "The steps themselves are not difficult; on the contrary, they are childishly simple; it is the easiest dance of all to do, and I think the hardest of all to do well."

Troy Kinney (1914) wrote the following about the Maxixe:

This is, virtually, a revival of the Two-step, plus certain Tango steps and enchainements (step sequences). Instead of the Tango's touch-and-turn-in of the foot, it employs a device of resting the heel on the floor, the foot pointed upward, while the body assumes a bent-over posture not particularly attractive.

== See also ==
- Corta Jaca
- Chiquinha Gonzaga
- Ernesto Nazareth
- Tango (music)
- Samba
- Polka
- Lundu
- Choro
