= Maurita Murphy Mead =

American musician

Maurita Murphy Mead (née Ellen Murphy) is an American clarinetist and music professor, the former professor of clarinet at the University of Iowa. Mead has been secretary of the International Clarinet Association.

== Education ==
Mead received her undergraduate degree and performer's certificate from the Eastman School of Music, where she studied clarinet with the D. Stanley Hasty. She was awarded her master's degree by Michigan State University, where she studied with Elsa Ludwig-Verdehr, and she earned her doctorate there in 1989.

== Teaching ==
Mead taught middle school in Rochester, NY, and on the advanced level at Western Michigan University.

She was a tenured professor at the University of Iowa from 1989 until 2014 and was a recipient of the Collegiate Teaching Award from the university. She and nine of her students were chosen to perform at a conference honoring D. Stanley Hasty at Ohio State University.

== Choro ==
Among other genres, Mead performs the classical Brazilian style of music, choro, and has performed on three continents. She has worked with composer Michael Eckert (also of the University of Iowa) to premiere some of the first chorus ever written with full notation for both the clarinet and the piano. Mead has released two CDs in this genre, Over the Fence and Red Hot and Brazilian. Both albums feature Mead on the clarinet and Rafael Dos Santos on the piano.

Mead is one of the artists participating in the Daniel Pearl World Music Days.
