= Joaquim Antônio da Silva Calado =

Brazilian composer and flautist

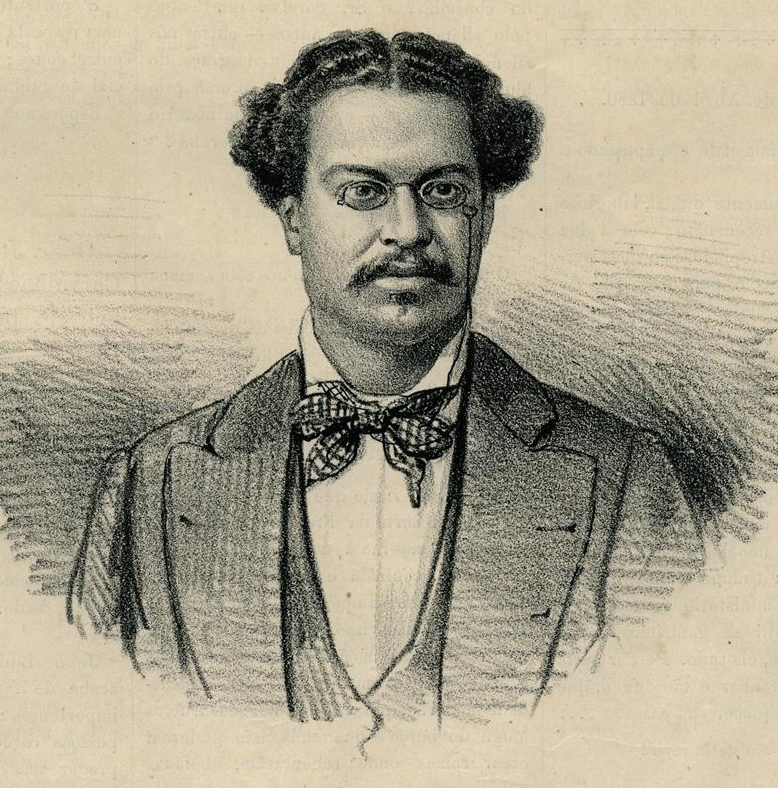
A portrait of Joaquim Callado by Angelo Agostini, published on the cover of the Revista Illustrada, No. 202, April 3, 1880

Joaquim Antônio da Silva Calado Júnior (or Callado; Rio de Janeiro, July 11, 1848 – Rio de Janeiro, March 20, 1880) was a Brazilian composer and flautist.

Callado is considered one of the creators of the choro genre of music. His band, O Choro do Callado, used an ebony flute, two guitars and a cavaquinho, and was noted for facility at improvisation. Callado wrote and co-authored many choros, as a new way of interpreting modinhas, lundus, waltzes and polkas. His work was an inspiration to his friend and pupil, Viriato Figueira, and his friend and band member, the female composer Chiquinha Gonzaga.

== Works ==
Cruzes, minha prima!
Polka "Cruzes, minha prima!", recorded in 1913 by Agenor Bens (flute) and Arthur Camilo (Piano)

- Adelaide
- Ai, Que Gozos
- Aurora
- Characteristic Whim
- Capricious
- Carnival of 1867
- Celeste
- Choro
- The Five Goddesses
- As It Is Good
- Conceicao
- Comforter
- Cruzes, Minha Prima!
- The Affected One
- The Desired One
- Ermelinda
- Ernestina
- The Meyer Family
- Fancy for Flute
- Loving Flower
- The Flowers of the Heart
- Florinda
- Hermeneutics
- Honorata
- Iman
- Improvisation
- Isabel
- Laudelina
- Souvenir of the Wharf of Glory
- Language of the Heart
- Fanado Iris
- Characteristic Lundu
- Manuela
- Manuelita
- Maria Carlota
- Mariquinhas
- Mimosa
- I Do Not Say
- What is Good, is Good!
- Pagodeira
- Dangerous
- Bigger Polka in D
- Polucena
- Puladora
- Wanted For All
- Kerosene
- The Return of Chico Triguera
- Rosinha
- Salome
- Saturnine
- Homesickness for the Wharf of Glory
- Homesickness for Inauma
- Saudosa
- The Seducer
- Sousinha
- Sigh
- Sighs of a Maiden
- Last Sigh
- Commercial Union
- Waltz
- August Twenty-first
- June Twenty-first
