= Corta Jaca =

Corta Jaca may refer to:

- Corta Jaca (dance), a traditional Brazilian dance
- Corta Jaca (ballroom Maxixe), a dance step described for the version of Maxixe in North American and Merican ballrooms
- Corta Jaca (samba step), a step from the syllabus of the International Style ballroom samba
- Corta Jaca (song), a song by Chiquinha Gonzaga
