= Choro =

Brazilian music genre

- Stylistic origins: Polka; mazurka; schottische; waltz; habanera; lundu; batuque
- Cultural origins: Late 19th century, Rio de Janeiro, Brazil

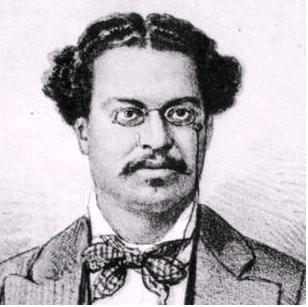
Joaquim Callado (1848-1880), considered one of the creators of the choro genre

Choro (Portuguese pronunciation: [ˈʃoɾu], "cry" or "lament"), also popularly called chorinho ("little cry" or "little lament"), is an instrumental Brazilian popular music genre which originated in 19th century Rio de Janeiro. Despite its name, the music often has a fast and happy rhythm. It is characterized by virtuosity, improvisation and subtle modulations, and is full of syncopation and counterpoint. Choro is considered the first characteristically Brazilian genre of urban popular music. The serenaders who play choros are known as chorões.

== Choro instruments ==
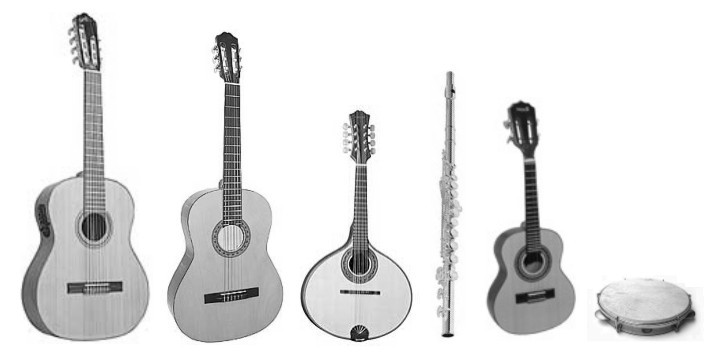
Instruments commonly played in choro, from left to right: the seven-string guitar, the acoustic guitar, the mandolin, the flute, the cavaquinho and the pandeiro

Originally choro was played by a trio of flute, guitar and cavaquinho (a small chordophone with four strings). Other instruments commonly played in choro are the mandolin, clarinet, saxophone, trumpet and trombone. These melody instruments are backed by a rhythm section composed of 6-string guitar, seven-string guitar (playing bass lines) and light percussion, such as a pandeiro. The cavaquinho appears sometimes as a melody instrument, other times as part of the rhythm.

O Urubu e o Gavião
Choro "O Urubu e o Gavião" (or "Urubu Malandro"), recorded in 1930 by Pixinguinha on the flute

Harmonia Selvagem
Choro "Harmonia Selvagem" composed by Dante Santoro. Recorded by Dante Santoro (flute) in 1938.

Amapá
Choro (maxixe/Brazilian tango) "Amapá" composed by Costa Júnior in 1901. Recorded by Dante Santoro (flute) in 1941.

Aguenta, seu Fulgêncio
Choro "Aguenta, seu Fulgêncio", composed by Lourenço Lamartine and played by Pixinguinha (flute) and Lourenço Lamartine. Recorded in 1929.

Sofres Porque Queres
Choro Sofres Porque Queres, recorded in 1919 by Pixinguinha on the flute

Escovado
"Escovado", composed (1905) and recorded (1930) by Ernesto_Nazareth (piano).

Mariana em Sarrilho
Polca-choro "Mariana em Sarrilho", composed by Irineu de Almeida, recorded in 1907 by Grupo do Novo Cordão

Tico-Tico no Fubá
Choro "Tico-Tico no Fubá". Composed by Zequinha de Abreu. Recorded in 1931 by Orquestra Colbaz.

Magoado
Choro "Magoado", composed and recorded (in 1930) by João Pernambuco (guitar).

Massada
Choro "Massada" composed by Lulu Cavaquinho, recorded in 1911 by Choro Carioca

Sultana
Polca-choro "Sultana", composed by Chiquinha Gonzaga, recorded in 1908 by the Grupo Chiquinha Gonzaga

Corta Jaca
Choro (maxixe) "Corta Jaca", composed by Chiquinha Gonzaga and performed by the Grupo Chiquinha Gonzaga. Recorded in 1910-1912.

Atraente
Choro (maxixe) "Atraente", composed by Chiquinha Gonzaga, recorded by Pixinguinha (saxophone) and Benedito Lacerda (flute).

1 x 0
Choro "1 x 0" (ou "Um a zero"), composed by Pixinguinha and Benedito Lacerda. Played by Pixinguinha (saxophone) and Benedito Lacerda (flute).

== Compositional structure ==
Structurally, a choro composition usually has three parts, played in a rondo form: AABBACCA, with each section typically in a different key (usually the tonal sequence is: principal key->relative mode->sub-dominant key). There are a variety of choros in both major and minor keys.

== History ==
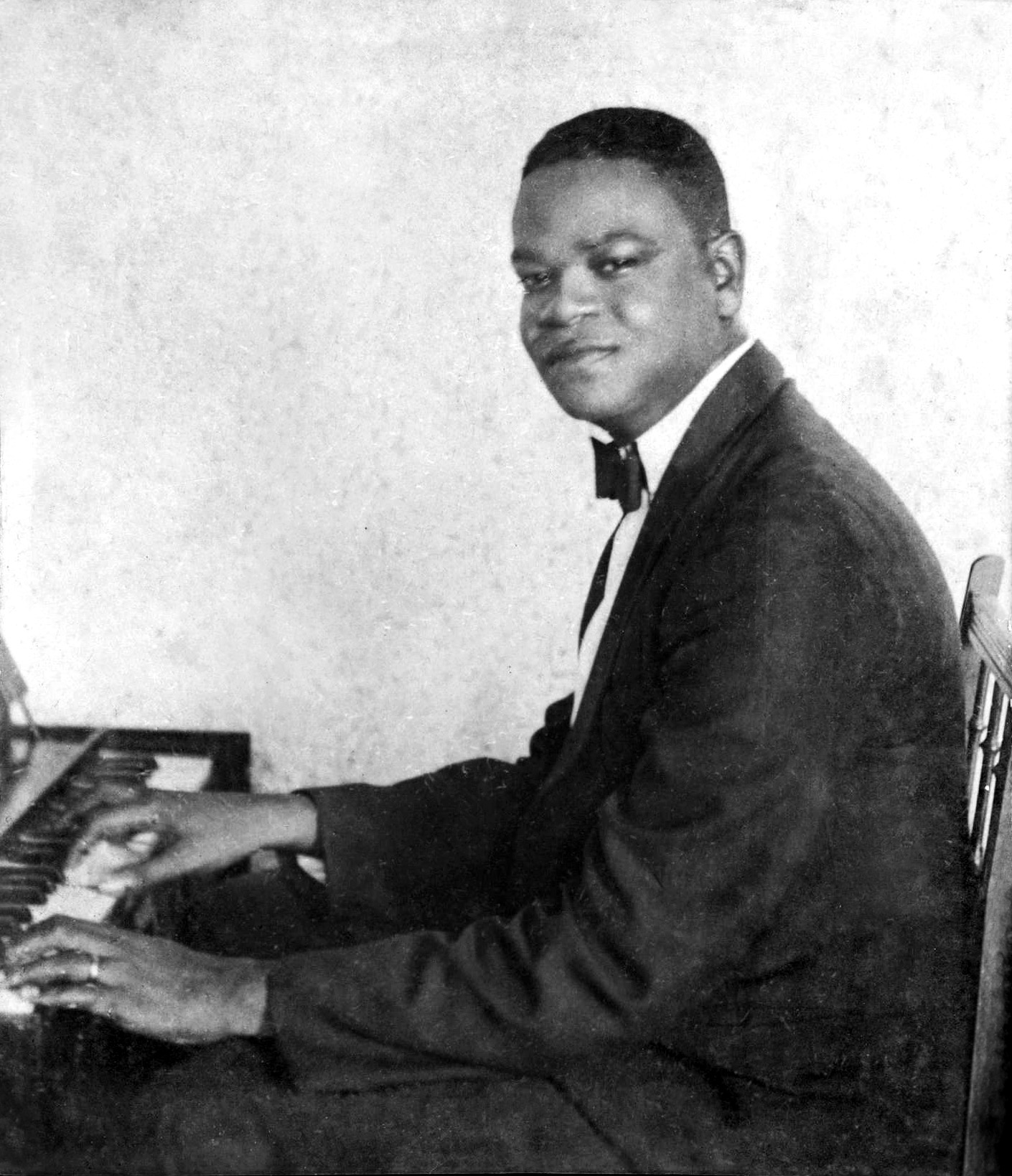
Pixinguinha (1897–1973), one of the most important choro composers of all time

There is some controversy as to the origin of the name choro: some sources claim it to be a conflation of the Portuguese word for "to cry" (chorar) and the Latin word chorus ("choir"), in reference to the originally melancholic accompaniments of European salon dances. Others affirm it to be an abbreviation of choromeleiros, which itself is a corruption of charameleiros, derived from charamela ("shawm"), later on extended to mean any musical group. Yet another source states that the name comes from xolo, a type of dance popular amongst the enslaved Africans in rural Brazil, which was rewritten as xoro (ironically, in order to avoid confusion with the identically pronounced word choro) and then, once it made its way into the cities, changed back into choro.

In the 19th century, choro resulted from the style of playing several musical genres (polka, schottische, waltz, mazurka and habanera) by carioca musicians, who were already strongly influenced by Afro-Brazilian rhythms, principally the lundu and the batuque. The term “choro” was used informally at first to refer to the style of playing, or a particular instrumental ensemble, (e.g. in the 1870s flutist Joaquim Antônio da Silva Calado formed an ensemble called "Choro Carioca", with flute, two guitars and cavaquinho), and later the term referred to the music genre of these ensembles. The accompanying music of the Maxixe (dance) (also called "tango brasileiro") was played by these choro ensembles. Various genres were incorporated as subgenres of choro such as "choro-polca", "choro-lundu", "choro-xote" (from schottische), "choro-mazurca", "choro-valsa" (waltz), "choro-maxixe", "samba-choro", "choro baião".

Just like ragtime in the United States, tango in Argentina and habanera in Cuba, choro springs up as a result of influences of musical styles and rhythms coming from Europe and Africa.

In the beginning (by the 1880s to 1920s), the success of choro came from informal groups of friends (principally composed of workers from the postal, railway and telegraphic services) which played at parties, pubs (botecos), streets and home balls (forrobodós). The mainstay of the repertoire was made of the big hits of Ernesto Nazareth, Chiquinha Gonzaga and other pianists, whose musical scores were published by print houses. By the 1910s, many of the first Brazilian phonograph records were choros.

Much of the mainstream success (by the 1930s to 1940s) of this style of music came from the early days of radio, when bands performed live on the air. By the 1950s and 1960s, it was replaced with urban samba on the radio, but it was still alive in amateur circles called "rodas de choro" (choro gatherings in residences and botecos), the most famous ones being the roda de choro in the house of composer and musician Jacob do Bandolim, in the Jacarepaguá neighborhood in Rio; and the "roda de choro" in the pub "Suvaco de Cobra" (Snake's Armpit) in the Penha neighborhood in the same town.

In the late 1970s there was a successful effort to revitalize the genre in the mainstream, through TV-sponsored nationwide festivals in 1977 and 1978, which attracted a new, younger generation of professional musicians and listeners. Thanks in great part to these efforts, choro music remains strong in Brazil. More recently, choro has attracted the attention of musicians in the United States, such as Anat Cohen, Mike Marshall and Maurita Murphy Mead, who have brought this kind of music to a new audience.

Most Brazilian classical composers recognize the sophistication of choro and its major importance in Brazilian instrumental music. Radamés Gnattali said it was the most sophisticated instrumental popular music in the world. Heitor Villa-Lobos defined choro as the true incarnation of Brazilian soul. Notably, both composers had some of their music inspired by choro, dressing it with classical tradition. The French composer Darius Milhaud was enchanted by choro when he lived in Brazil (in 1917) and he composed the ballet Le Bœuf sur le toit, in which he quotes close to 30 Brazilian tunes.

According to Aquiles Rique Reis (a Brazilian singer), ”Choro is classical music played with bare feet and callus on the hands”

== See also ==
- Frevo
- Jongo
- Lundu
- Maxixe
- Samba
- Seresta

Films

- 2005 – Brasileirinho. Directed by Mika Kaurismäki.
- 2016 – "Mexicano: Carlito y La Choro Fábrica". Directed by Cristina Gonzalez.
