= Corta Jaca (ballroom Maxixe) =

Ballroom dance step

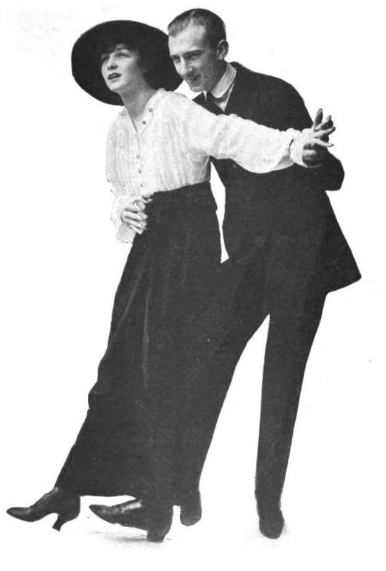
Corta Jaca step as demonstrated by the Castles

Corta Jaca is a step from maxixe, as danced in European and North American ballrooms and as described by Vernon and Irene Castle in their 1914 book Modern Dancing.

The book describes "Le Corta Jaca" as follows:

This step in New York is called 'Skating'. It seems to be a very good name for it, as the position you take is exactly the same as that taken by skaters when they are skating side by side. You get into the step in this way: When we left off, we were doing the Two Step. Now, if the gentleman will do a single step and still keep his partner doing a Two Step, he will find that she turns around so that she is side by side with him. As soon as she is in this position, and he finds that he is on the same foot as she is, that is, in step with her, he resumes the Two Step down the room (but he is naturally at the side of her instead of in front).

He must always remember to pass his right leg in front of the lady when going forward, just as her left passes in front of him.

There is a dip to this step which you can put in or not as you please. It is a slow dip made after you have taken the step with the right foot and is finished as you are taking the step with the left foot.

== See also ==
- Corta Jaca (disambiguation)
