= Christiana Guinle =

Brazilian actress and producer

- Born: c. 1965 (age 59–60); Brazil
- Education: Royal Shakespeare Company

Christiana Guinle (born c. 1965) is a gender-fluid Brazilian actress and producer who graduated from the Royal Shakespeare Company in England.

== Theater - actress ==
- Homer’s Odissey – won Mambembe best actress award
- O Ateneu, by Raul Pompéia - won Mambembe best new actress award
- Medea, by Eurípedes
- LuLu, by Frank Wedekind
- The Blind, by Ghelderode – Shell best actress award nominee

== Theater – actress and producer ==
- Hell is Other People, based on Jean-Paul Sartre’s Huis-Clos – Molière best actress award nominee
- O Anjo Negro (The Dark Angel), by Nelson Rodrigues – won A.P.C.A. best actress award
- A Dana do Mar (The Lady from the Sea), by Ibsen – won Shell best actress award
- God, by Woody Allen
- Raised in Captivity, by Nicky Silver

== Cinema ==
- A Espera (The Wait), by Luiz Fernando Carvalho – the film won Gramado best film award
- Mil e Uma (One Thousand and One), by Suzana Morais about Marcel Duchamp’s work
- Metalguru, by Flavio Colker – won Berlin’s alternative festival best actress award

== Television ==
- Chiquinha Gonzaga, by Manoel Carlos – television miniseries about the life of Chiquinha Gonzaga (Brazilian composer, pianist, and conductor), broadcast by Rede Globo Network
- A Casa das Sete Mulheres (The House of Seven Women), by Maria Adelaide Amaral - television miniseries broadcast by Rede Globo Network .
- Um Só Coração (Just One Heart), by Maria Adelaide Amaral - television miniseries broadcast by Rede Globo Network
- JK, by Maria Adelaide Amaral - television miniseries about the life of Juscelino Kubitschek (President of Brazil from 1956 to 1961), broadcast by Rede Globo Network
- Lado a Lado - Rede Globo Network (2012-2013)

== Personal life ==
Guinle is genderfluid and lesbian with fluid sexuality.
