= Domingos Caldas Barbosa =

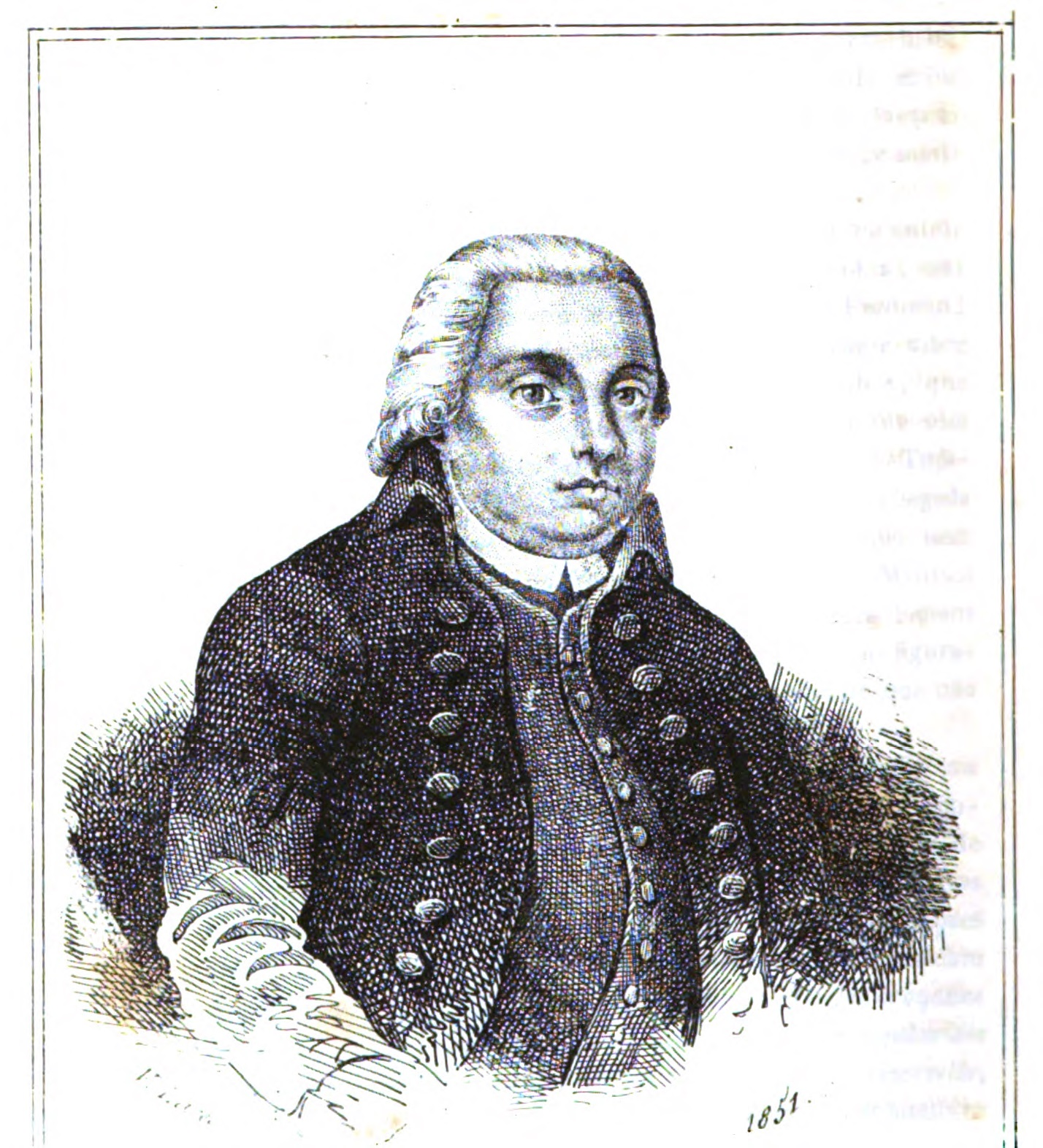
- A gravure depicting Barbosa
- Born: 1739; Rio de Janeiro City, Rio de Janeiro, Portuguese Colony of Brazil
- Died: November 9, 1800 (aged 60–61); Lisbon, Kingdom of Portugal
- Education: University of Coimbra
- Occupations: Poet, musician
- Writing career
- Pen name: Lereno Selinuntino
- Notable work: Viola de Lereno "A Doença" "A Vingança da Cigana"
- Literary movement: Neoclassicism

Domingos Caldas Barbosa (c.1739 — November 9, 1800) was a Colonial Brazilian Neoclassic poet and musician, famous for creating the modinha. He wrote under the pen name Lereno.

Barbosa is the patron of the third chair of the Academia Brasileira de Música (Brazilian Academy of Music).

== Life ==
Domingos Caldas Barbosa.

Barbosa's date of birth is unknown. It is most accepted to be in 1739, in Rio de Janeiro, to a Portuguese man and a liberated Angolan slave woman. Trained at the Jesuit college in Rio de Janeiro, he developed a power of literary improvisation which he indulged at the expense of the Portuguese whites and thereby stirred them up against him. His enemies had him forcibly enrolled in a body of troops setting forth for the Colonia del Sacramento, where he remained until 1762. Following his return to Rio Janeiro, he soon embarked for Portugal, and there obtained the patronage of two nobles of the Vasconcellos family, the Conde de Pombeiro and the Marquez de Castello Melhor. Taking minor orders, he received a religious benefice-- being attached as chaplain to the Casa da Supplicaçáo.

Although he was a mulatto, he obtained entrance into high society in the Portuguese capital: he could improvise cantigas and play his own accompaniment on the viol. Hence the condescending nickname cantor de viola which was given to him. Well aware that his social status was uncertain, he retained his self-possession even in the face of the insulting attitude of the poet Bocage and others.

With most of the Portuguese poets of the time he had good relations, consorting with them in one or another literary academy. His cantigas acquired great popularity. He was a minor poet with facility, able to express himself simply, and to avoid bombast and sensuality. His poetical definition of the characteristically Portuguese quality of saudades remains famous.

Barbosa's poems were published posthumously, in 1825, under the name Viola de Lereno (Lereno's Viol).

== Sources ==
- Edition of his poems published under his academic name of Lereno, Viola de Lereno: collecçao das suas cantigas, etc. (Lisbon, 1825);
- De Varnhagen, Francisco Adolfo: Florilegio da poesia brazileira (Lisbon, 1850), I, II, III (Madrid, 1853);
- Wolf, Ferdinand: Le Brésil littéraire (Berlin, 1863) (online);
- Romero, Sylvio: Hist. da litt. brazileira (Rio de Janeiro, 1902)
