= Botequim =

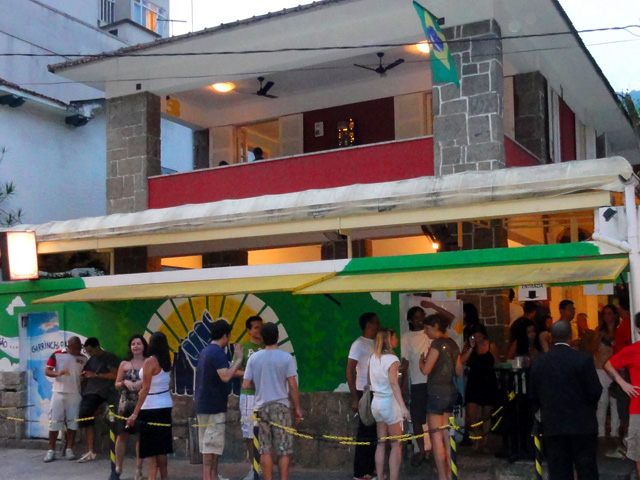
Boteco in Rio de Janeiro

Boteco (Portuguese pronunciation: [boˈtɛku]) or Botequim/Butiquim ([boteˈkĩ, butʃiˈkĩ]) are terms derived from the Portuguese of Portugal "botica", (cognate with Castilian Spanish "bodega") which derives from the Greek "Apotheke", which means storage, grocery store or where goods were sold by retail.

In Portugal, the "boteco" was a warehouse or store where groceries and offal were sold and the same meaning belongs to the Spanish bodega.

In Brazil, the boteco (buteco), or botequim, is traditionally known as a place where alcoholic beverages are sold, serving as a meeting place for "bohemians" looking for a good drink, cheap snacks, appetizers and a relaxed conversation.

== Brazilian cities ==
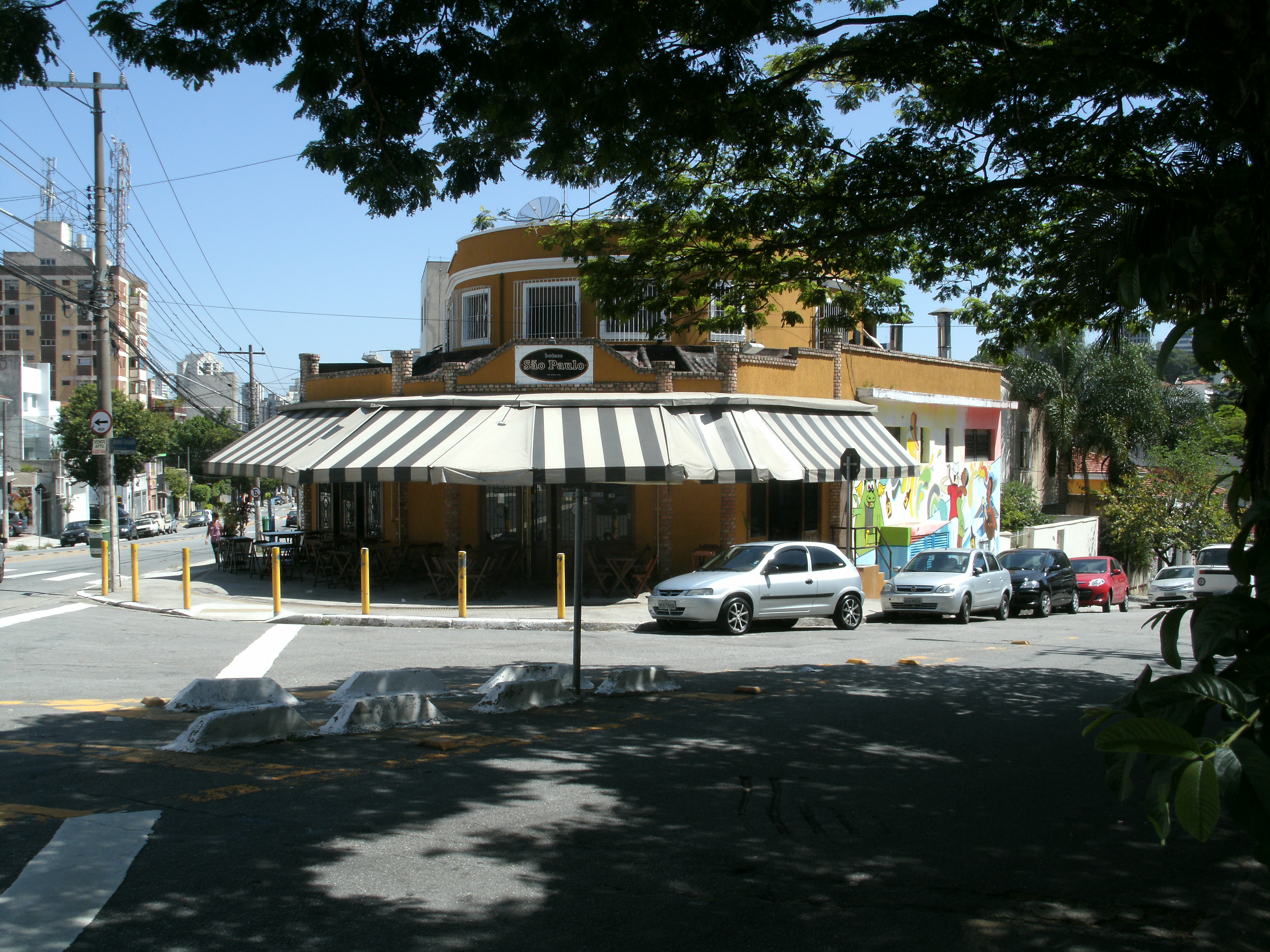
Boteco in São Paulo

In Rio de Janeiro, the "botequins" are also known as "pé-sujo" (dirty-feet) when sanitary conditions are questionable. In Belo Horizonte, nationally known as the "Brazilian capital of the boteco", there are about 12,000 establishments, more bars per capita than any other city in the world.

Also in Belo Horizonte is used often the term "boteco-copo-sujo" (dirty-cup-pub) which is an offshoot of the genre "boteco" for definition of the level of slovenliness of the establishment, in allusion to its appearance, as though welcoming, most no prizes for their apparent aspects such as cleaning or air. Among the delicacies of the most unusual boteco, we can cite the traditional liver with onions (figado acebolado), spicy chorizo (chouriço apimentado) or the fried scarlet eggplant (jiló frito), accompanied by beer, the chopp, the famous caipirinha or the cachaça.

There is even a well-known competition between the crowded bars of Belo Horizonte to select which has the best and most traditional pub food. This festival is called Comida de Boteco and was created in 1999 by gourmet Eduardo Maya.

The Mercado Central (Central Market place) in Belo Horizonte crowds several examples of traditional pubs of mining capital, with famous "tira-gosto" (snacks) (so called delicacies of foodstuff derived from the establishment)

== See also ==
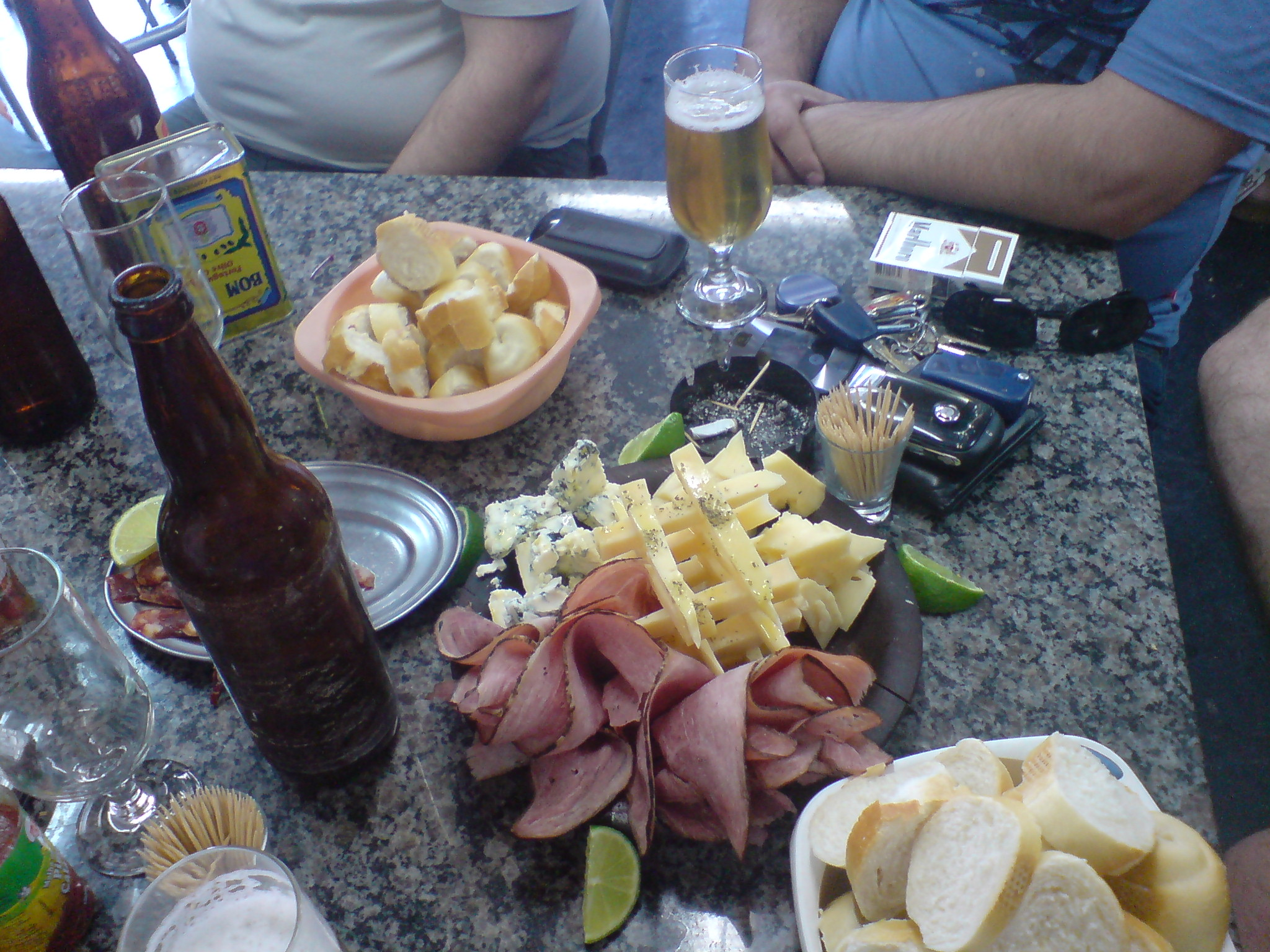
Typical boteco food

- List of public house topics
