= Gaúcho (song) =

Corta jaca
Choro (maxixe) "Corta jaca", composed by Chiquinha Gonzaga and executed by the Grupo Chiquinha Gonzaga. Recorded in 1910-1912.

Gaúcho or Corta Jaca is the Brazilian tango (maxixe) composed by Chiquinha Gonzaga, her most recorded song. It was a song from the burlesque operetta Zizinha Maxixe first staged in 1895.

The original title being Gaucho, the song had the subtitle Dança do Corta-jaca. Eventually, Corta jaca had become the best known title of the song. The dance in question is a Brazilian traditional dance, characterized by energetic individual spins, gymnastic moves, and percussive footwork. The expression "corta jaca" literally means "cut the jackfruit" and has a sexual innuendo, seen in the number Gaúcho itself.

The song caused a minor scandal when the First Lady of Brazil, Nair de Teffé, performed it on guitar in public in 1914. Catulo da Paixão Cearense's interpretations were successful and, in 1914, they encouraged Nair de Tefé to organize a recital to launch Corta Jaca, although Nair knew Chiquinha's songs, they never met in person. There were criticisms of the government and resounding comments about the "scandals" in the palace for promoting and disseminating songs whose origins were in lewd and vulgar dances, according to the conception of the social elite.

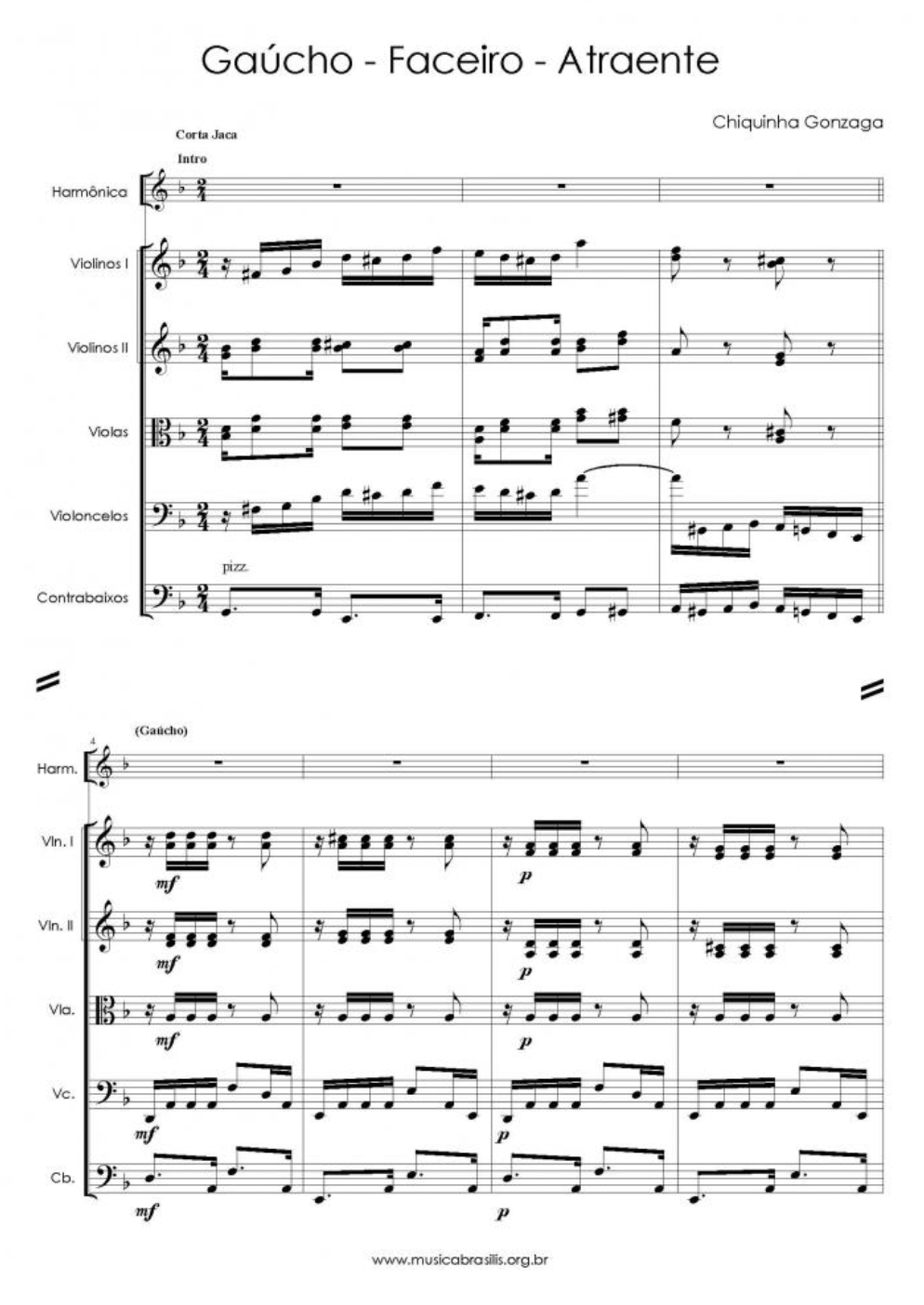
Gaúcho - 1st page - Score available at Portal Musica Brasilis

== See also ==
- Corta Jaca (disambiguation)
