= Modinha =

Modinha is the affectionate (grammatically called 'diminutive') form of the Portuguese noun "moda", meaning "fashion". The word "moda" is also used in Portugal, today, generally referring to traditional regional songs. In Portugal, "modinha" was, from the last third part of the 18th to the beginning of the 19th century, a general term designating sentimental songs in Portuguese.

Under this designation were referred, in fact, in this time (from the last third part of the 18th to the beginning of 19th century), musical realities of very diversified characteristics, with grade of very variable poetic and musical complexities and cultivated in also very different social circuits. They designated 'modinhas' (aristocrats') salon songs of academic composers, many times with texts of Portuguese Arcadia poets, sometimes with one vocal line, others two voices in counterpoint, in both cases with a more or less elaborated accompaniment of a harmonic instrument, generally harpsichord. But the term was also used many times by foreign travelers referring to songs of farmers of Lisbon's neighboring regions and of blind beggars of the capital's street. In these cases most mentioned characters are the simplicity of guitar's harmonic accompaniment, the melancholic and nostalgic character of poem and of melody, and improvising nature of interpretation.

The modinha, in Brazil, is a type of sentimental love song. It is generally considered part of the roots of Brazilian popular music, along with the lundu, because they were the first representative music of the people of Brazil, at the time of getting their identity as Brazilians, not the dwellers of Portuguese colony. Roughly speaking, the modinha, as well as the lundu, had parallel diffusion in both Portugal and Brazil. The origin of the modinha was in Europe, the lundu Africa.

The modinha is of uncertain origin, but it may have evolved in either Brazil or Portugal. Around the end of 18th century, Domingos Caldas Barbosa wrote a series of modinhas that were extremely popular, especially in salons, and so can be termed salon music. The modinha of the late 19th century was sung in the streets or as an outdoor serenade, usually accompanied by flute, guitar, and cavaquinho.

The earliest known literary reference to "Brazilian modinha", most likely in reference to Barbosa's music, was made by Portuguese satirical poet Nicolau Tolentino de Almeida in 1779. One of his characters in a farce from 1786—A rabugem das velhas [The old women's rage]—also mentions "this new modinha that's been invented now", which sends her grandmother into a rage, eulogizing the past.

== See also ==
- Music of Brazil
