= Lundu (dance) =

Style of Afro-Brazilian music and dance

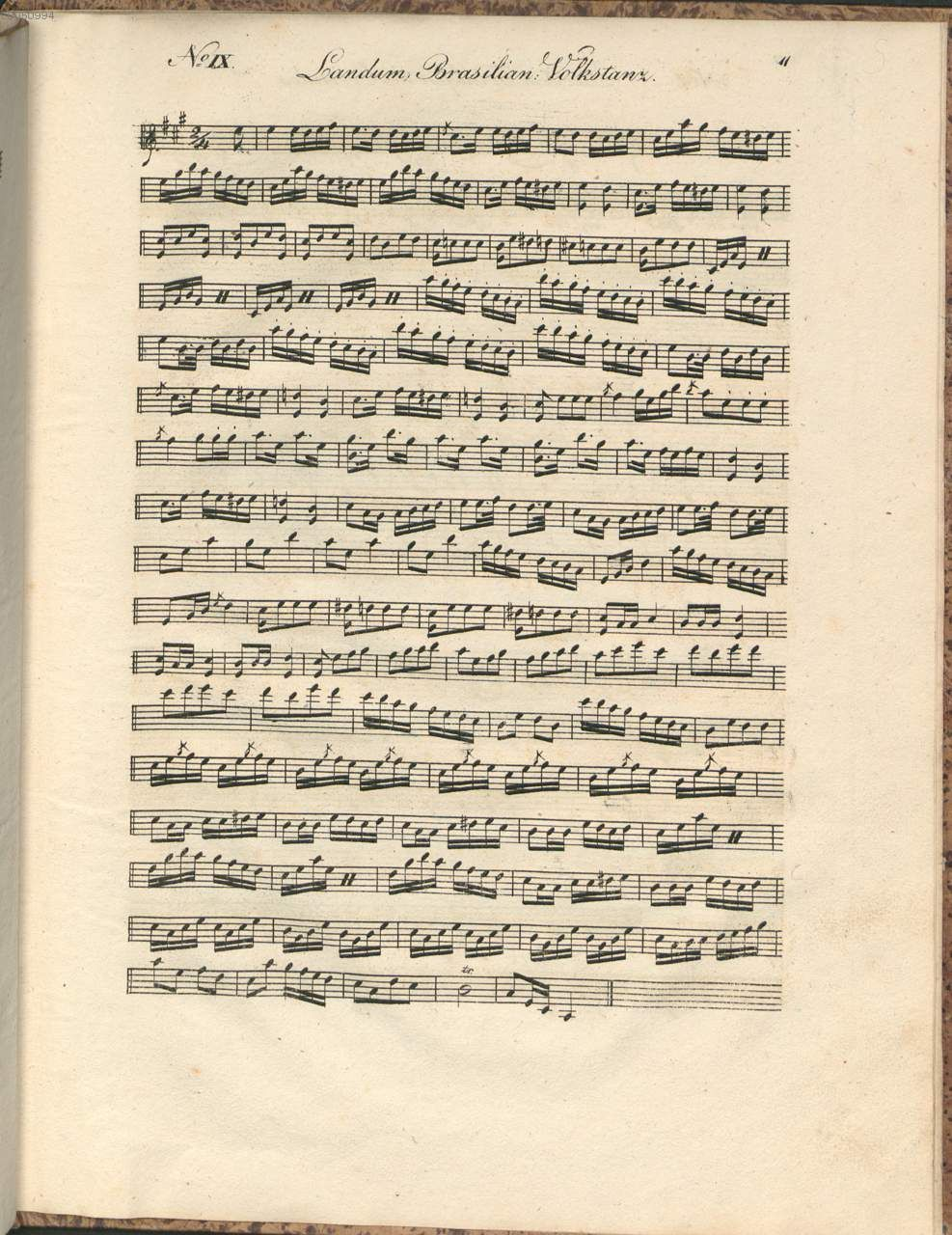
Lundu documented by Von Martius in Brazil, 1817-1820..

Lundu (also spelled landu or landum) is a style of Afro-Brazilian music and dance with its origins in the African Bantu and Portuguese people.

== History ==
The interconnectedness of Lusophone countries dates back to the Atlantic Slave Trade, between Portugal, Brazil and regions of Africa. In the 15th century, the Portuguese were the primary exporters of African slaves to the Americas, and with slaves came their musical traditions. Throughout the 17th and 18th centuries, there was a massive Brazilian presence in Angola, enabling a cultural exchange between the two Portuguese colonies. This exchange enabled subtle amalgamations of musical styles between Angola, Brazil and other African slave trade countries. The establishment of a creole population in Brazil led to further cultural developments in language, religion and art. In 1859, French journalist Charles Ribeyrolles described Afro-Brazilian free practices on a fazenda in Rio de Janeiro province:

Saturday evening, after the last working task of the week, and on holidays that give idleness and rest, the blacks have an hour or two of the evening for dancing. They assemble in their terreiro, calling, gathering and inciting each other, and the celebration starts. Here it is the capoeira, a kind of Pyrrhic dance, with daring combat evolutions, regulated by the Congo drum; there it is the batuque, with its cold or indecent postures which the urucungo, viola with thin cords, accelerates or contains; further away it is a frenzied dance where the gaze, the breasts and the hips provoke. It is a kind of inebriated convulsion one calls the lundu.

== Dissemination ==
Records from the inquisition of the 18th century reveal that the Europeans initially considered gandus and lundus to be witchcraft. Many slave-owning Europeans in Brazil tolerated the dance in an attempt to avoid slave rebellion. Eventually, the style became attractive to Europeans in Brazil for its sexualized quality and its believed effectiveness in reversing witchcraft. de Mattos was disgruntled by the blurring by dance and drums of strict racial and cultural boundaries in Brazil.

Gradually, the lundu style grew in popularity among the elite population in Brazil. In 1749, Brazilian musician Manuel de Almeida Botelho immigrated to Lisbon, bringing with him the modinha and lundu musical styles. By the 19th century, lundu had become the music of choice for the Luso-Brazilian bourgeoisie. Historians have even called the style the “…most characteristic late 18th century [genre] of dance and song in Portugal and Brazil”.

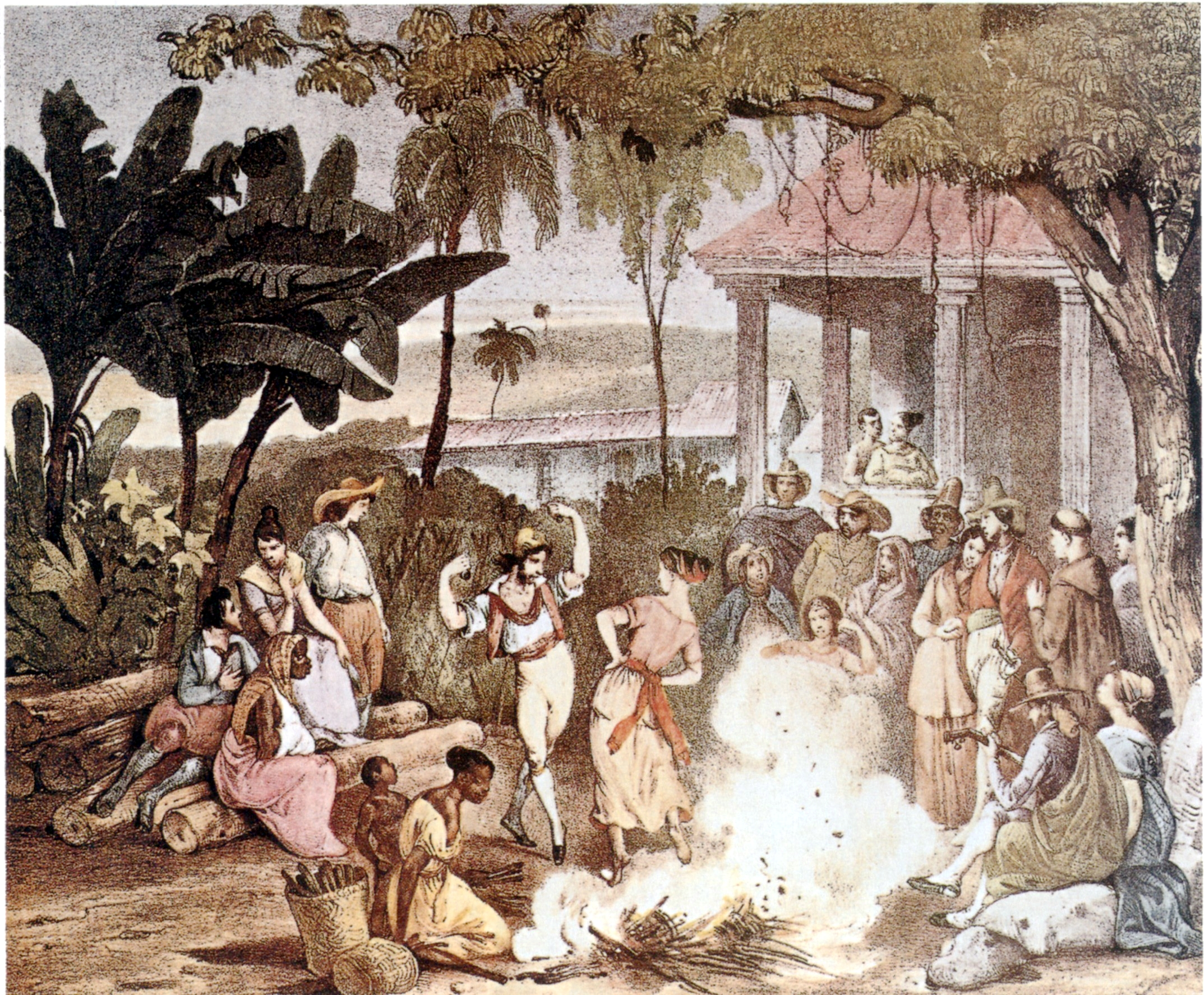
A Lundu performance in the 18th century, as depicted in a print from artist Rugendas

== Style ==
Lundus are characterized by varying structure, the interplay of tonic and dominant harmony, and strummed chords layered atop a syncopated rhythm reminiscent of traditional West African music. Limited recordings are available of traditional lundus style. Usually a flirtatious ritual of a couple dance, accompanied by a guitar, or sometimes a thumb piano or drums, Lundu is related to the Spanish fandango and other new-world dances like the Argentine Zamba, the Peruvian Zamacueca and the Cuban Bolero - they all involve, to some degree, handkerchiefs, castanets, and holding one's arms above one's head. In the 19th century, the lundu was one of the sources of the Choro, the Maxixe and the Samba.

== Literature ==
- Assunção, Matthias Röhrig (2002). Capoeira: The History of an Afro-Brazilian Martial Art. Routledge. ISBN 978-0-7146-8086-6.
