= List of Latin Americans =

This is a list of notable Latin American people, in alphabetical order within categories.

== Actors ==
- Norma Aleandro (born 1936)
- Héctor Alterio (born 1929)
- Rafael Amaya (born 1977)
- Imperio Argentina (1906–2003)
- Pedro Armendáriz (1912–1963)
- Carla Baratta (born 1990)
- Adrian Bellani (born 1982)
- Diego Bertie (born 1967)
- Rubén Blades (born 1948)
- Marcela Bovio (born 1979)
- Sônia Braga (born 1950)
- Richard Cabral (born 1984)
- Cantinflas (1911–1993)
- Barbara Carrera (born 1951)
- Grecia Colmenares (born 1962)
- Ricardo Darín (born 1957)
- Colman Domingo (born 1969)
- Dolores del Río (1904–1983)
- Lali Espósito (born 1991)
- María Félix (1914–2002)
- Andrés García (born 1941)
- Andy García (born 1956)
- Danay García (born 1984)
- Gael García Bernal (born 1978)
- Diane Guerrero (born 1986)
- Darío Grandinetti (born 1959)
- Maribel Guardia (born 1959)
- Salma Hayek (born 1966)
- Pedro Infante (1917–1957)
- Oscar Isaac (born 1979)
- Raul Julia (1940–1994)
- Katy Jurado (1924–2002)
- Libertad Lamarque (1908–2000)
- John Leguizamo (born 1964)
- Federico Luppi (1936–2017)
- Santiago Magill (born 1977)
- Christian Meier (born 1970)
- Carmen Miranda (1909–1955)
- Ricardo Montalbán (1920–2009)
- Fernanda Montenegro (born 1929)
- Maria Montez (1912–1951)
- Rita Moreno (born 1931)
- Wagner Moura (born 1976)
- Jorge Negrete (1911–1953)
- Gianella Neyra (born 1977)
- Miguel A. Núñez Jr. (born 1964)
- Edward James Olmos (born 1947)
- Natalia Oreiro (born 1977)
- J.D. Pardo (born 1980)
- Manny Pérez (born 1969)
- Silvia Pinal (born 1931)
- Danny Pino (born 1974)
- Anthony Quinn (1915-2001)
- Dania Ramirez (born 1980)
- Emilio Rivera (born 1961)
- Zoe Saldaña (born 1978)
- Catalina Sandino Moreno (born 1981)
- Christian Serratos (born 1990)
- Benicio del Toro (born 1967)
- Christy Turlington (born 1969)
- Lupe Vélez (1908–1944)
- Sofía Vergara (born 1972)
- China Zorrilla (1922–2014)
- Gina Rodriguez (born 1984)
- Isabela Moner (born 2001)

== Artists and designers ==
See also List of Latin American artists.

- (Brazil) Aleijadinho (1730 or 1738 – 1814), sculptor
- (Colombia) Julio Abril (1911–1979), sculptor
- (Brazil) Tarsila do Amaral (1886–1973), painter, considered one of the leading modernist artists in Latin America
- (Colombia) Fernando Botero (1932–2023), painter and sculptor
- (Brazil) Adriana Melo, comic book artist, notable for her work on the Star Wars: Empire franchise
- (Uruguay) Luis Camnitzer (born 1937), conceptual artist
- (Brazil) Roger Mello (born 1965), children's book illustrator
- (Puerto Rico) José Campeche (1751–1809), painter
- (Brazil) Lygia Clark (1920–1988), painter and sculptor
- (Chile) Marcela Donoso (born 1961), painter
- (Peru) Pancho Fierro (1810–1879), illustrator
- (Venezuela) Gego (1912–1994), geometric-abstract sculptor
- (Brazil) Paulo Mendes da Rocha (1928–2021), architect
- (Mexico) José Guadalupe Posada (1852–1913), illustrator and cartoonist, printmaker
- (Chile) Alfredo Jaar (born 1956), installation artist
- (Mexico) Frida Kahlo (1907–1954), realist and symbolist painter
- (Brazil) Ruth Kedar (born 1955), artist and designer
- (Argentina) Guillermo Kuitca (born 1961), painter
- (Brazil) Gabriel Bá and Fabio Moon, comic book artist
- (Cuba) Wifredo Lam (1902–1982), painter
- (Chile) Roberto Matta (1911–2002), painter
- (Brazil) Abraham Palatnik (1928–2020), abstract artist and inventor
- (Cuba) Ana Mendieta (1948–1985), performance artist
- (Argentina) Lola Mora (1866–1936), sculptor
- (Brazil) Hélio Oiticica (1937–1980), painter and sculptor
- (Puerto Rico) Francisco Oller (1833–1917), impressionist painter
- (Mexico) José Clemente Orozco (1883–1949), mural painter and lithographer
- (Brazil) Candido Portinari (1903–1962), painter
- (Argentina) Benito Quinquela Martín (1890–1977), painter
- (Peru) Diego Quispe Tito (1611–1681), Cuzco School painter
- (Brazil) Eduardo Kobra (born 1976), graffiti artist
- (Venezuela) Armando Reverón (1889–1954), painter
- (Mexico) Diego Rivera (1886–1957), muralist
- (Cuba) (United States) Emilio Hector Rodriguez (born 1950), painter and photographer
- (Brazil) Gustavo Ramos (born 1993), artist and oil painter
- (Peru) José Sabogal (1888–1956), indigenist painter
- (Mexico) David Alfaro Siqueiros (1896–1974), social realist painter and muralist
- (Venezuela) Jesús Rafael Soto (1923–2005), kinetic and op artist
- (Mexico) Rufino Tamayo (1899–1991), painter, artist
- (Brazil) Oscar Niemeyer (1907–2012), architect
- (Uruguay) Joaquín Torres-García (1874–1949), constructivist painter
- (Mexico) (Spain) Remedios Varo (1908–1963), surrealist painter
- (Brazil) Constantine Andreou (1917–2007), painter and sculptor

== Fashion ==
- (Brazil) Gisele Bündchen (born 1980), fashion model
- (Argentina) Valeria Mazza (born 1972), fashion model
- (Brazil) Francisco Costa (born 1964), designer
- (Dominican Republic) (Puerto Rico) Oscar de la Renta (1932–2014), fashion designer
- (Colombia) Nina García (born 1965), fashion editor
- (Brazil) Hans Stern (1922–2007), jeweler and businessman
- (Uruguay) Gabriela Hearst (born 1976), fashion designer
- (Brazil) Alexandre Herchcovitch (born 1971), fashion designer
- (Venezuela) Carolina Herrera (born 1939), fashion designer
- (Peru) Mario Testino (born 1954), fashion photographer
- (Brazil) Alessandra Ambrósio (born 1981), fashion person

== Film directors ==
- (Argentina) Andy Muschietti (born 1973)
- (Brazil) Francisco Antônio de Almeida Júnior (1851–1928), important figure in the development of cinematography
- (Argentina) Damian Szifron (born 1975)
- (Chile) (Spain) Alejandro Amenábar (born 1972)
- (Mexico) Alfonso Arau (born 1932)
- (Brazil) Carlos Saldanha (born 1965) animator
- (Argentina) Adolfo Aristarain (born 1943)
- (Argentina) (Brazil) Héctor Babenco (born 1946)
- (Spain) (Mexico) Luis Buñuel (1900–1983)
- (Argentina) Juan José Campanella (born 1959)
- (Venezuela) Román Chalbaud (1931–2023)
- (Mexico) Alfonso Cuarón (born 1961)
- (Chile) Juan Downey (1940–1993)
- (Argentina) Lucrecia Martel (born 1966)
- (Cuba) Sara Gómez (1942–1974)
- (Spain) (Venezuela) Guillermo Fantástico González (1945–2020)
- (Mexico) Alejandro González Iñárritu (born 1963)
- (Chile) Alejandro Jodorowsky (born 1929)
- (Argentina) León Klimovsky (1906–1996)
- (Chile) Claudia Llosa (born 1976)
- (Brazil) Fernando Meirelles (born 1955)
- (Venezuela) Franco de Peña (born 1966)
- (Argentina) Lucía Puenzo (born 1976)
- (Mexico) Arturo Ripstein (born 1943)
- (Chile) Raúl Ruiz (director) (1941–2011)
- (Brazil) Walter Salles (born 1956)
- (Cuba) Amy Serrano (born 1966)
- (Mexico) Guillermo del Toro (born 1964)

== Leaders and politicians ==
- José Mujica (1935-2025), President of Uruguay
- (Argentina) Leandro N. Alem (1841–1896), politician
- Nayib Bukele (born 1981), President of El Salvador
- (Costa Rica) Óscar Arias (born 1940), statesman, Nobel Peace Prize
- Cristina Kirchner (born 1953), President of Argentina
- (Spain) Francisco de Miranda (1750–1816), Supreme Chief of First Republic of Venezuela
- Julio A. Roca (born 1843), President of Argentina
- Antonio Saca (born 1965), President of El Salvador
- Rómulo Betancourt (1908–1981), President of Venezuela
- (Venezuela) Simón Bolívar (1783–1830), Libertador in Spanish American wars of independence
- Javier Milei (born 1970), President of Argentina
- Anastasio Bustamante (1780–1853), President of Mexico
- Plutarco Elías Calles (1877–1945), President of Mexico
- Fidel Castro (1926–2016), Prime Minister, later President of Cuba
- (Mexico) Alfonso García Robles (1911–1991), diplomat and politician, Nobel Peace Prize
- José Gaspar Rodríguez de Francia (1766–1840), Supreme Dictator of Paraguay
- (Argentina) Che Guevara (1928–1967), Marxist revolutionary
- (Mexico) Miguel Hidalgo y Costilla (1753–1811), Chief instigator of Mexican War of Independence
- Benito Juárez (1806–1872), President of Mexico
- Juscelino Kubitschek (1902–1976), President of Brazil
- Alberto Lleras Camargo (1906–1990), President of Colombia
- Leopoldo López (born 1971), Mayor of Chacao, Venezuela
- (Cuba) José Martí (1853–1895), leader of Cuban Independence movement
- (Argentina) Juan Manuel de Rosas (born 1793), Caudillo
- (Guatemala) Rigoberta Menchú (born 1959), activist, Nobel Peace Prize
- (Brazil) Chico Mendes (1944–1988), trade union leader and environmentalist
- (Colombia) Antonio Nariño (1765–1824), political and military leader
- (Peru) Javier Pérez de Cuéllar (1920–2020), United Nations Secretary-General
- (Argentina) Adolfo Pérez Esquivel (born 1931), activist, Nobel Peace Prize
- Juan Perón (1895–1974), President of Argentina
- (Argentina) Carlos Saavedra Lamas (1878–1959), academic and politician, Nobel Peace Prize
- (Argentina) José de San Martín (1778–1850), Libertador in Spanish American wars of independence
- (Nicaragua) Augusto César Sandino (1985–1934), guerilla leader and revolutionary
- (Mexico) Pancho Villa (1878–1923), guerrilla leader of the Mexican Revolution
- (Mexico) Emiliano Zapata (1879–1919), guerrilla leader of the Mexican Revolution
- Lula da Silva (born 1945), President of Brazil
- (Puerto Rico) Pedro Albizu Campos (1891–1965), president of the Puerto Rican Nationalist Party
- Evo Morales (born 1959), president of Bolivia

== Monarchs ==
- Agustin I (1783–1824), independence leader, Emperor of Mexico
- (Argentina) Pope Francis (born 1936), Sovereign of Vatican City State
- Pedro I (1798–1834), independence leader, Emperor of Brazil
- Pedro II (1825–1891), Emperor of Brazil

=== Imperial/royal consorts ===
- Ana María Huarte (1786–1861), Empress consort of Mexico
- Amélie of Leuchtenberg (1812–1834), Empress consort of Brazil
- Carlota of Mexico (1840–1927), Empress consort of Mexico
- Maria Leopoldina of Austria (1797–1826), Empress consort of Brazil
- (Cuba) Maria Teresa, Grand Duchess of Luxembourg (born 1956), Grand Duchess consort of Luxembourg
- (Argentina) Máxima of the Netherlands (born 1971), Queen consort of the Netherlands
- Teresa Cristina of the Two Sicilies (1843–1889), Empress consort of Brazil

== Musicians ==
- (Argentina) Carlos Gardel (born 1890), singer, songwriter, composer and actor
- (Brazil) Gustavo Assis-Brasil, guitarist
- (Uruguay) (United States) Miguel del Águila (born 1957), composer
- (Brazil) Alok (DJ) (born 1991), musician, DJ, and record producer
- (Dominican Republic) Michel Camilo (born 1954), pianist and composer
- (Venezuela) Simón Díaz (1928–2014), composer, actor and singer
- (Brazil) Gilberto Gil (born 1942), singer and composer
- (Peru) Chabuca Granda (1920–1983), singer and composer
- (Puerto Rico) Rafael Hernández Marín (1892–1965), composer
- (Brazil) Antônio Carlos Jobim (1927–1994), pianist, singer and composer
- (Mexico) Agustín Lara (1900–1970), composer
- (Cuba) Ernesto Lecuona (1896–1963), composer, pianist and conductor
- (Brazil) Vinicius de Moraes (1913–1980), singer and composer
- (Argentina) Ástor Piazzolla (1921–1992), tango composer
- (Puerto Rico) Tito Puente (1923–2000), Latin jazz and mambo musician
- (Puerto Rico) Omar Rodríguez-López (born 1975), guitarist
- (Mexico) (United States) Carlos Santana (born 1947), composer, songwriter and guitarist
- (Brazil) Eloy Casagrande (born 1991), drummer
- (Argentina) Lalo Schifrin (born 1932), composer and pianist
- (Peru) Pedro Suárez-Vértiz (born 1966), pianist, singer and composer
- (Brazil) Caetano Veloso (born 1942), singer and composer
- (Argentina) Lito Vitale (born 1961), composer and performer
- (Brazil) Laurindo Almeida (1917–1995), guitarist and composer in classical
- (Argentina) Atahualpa Yupanqui (1908–1992), folk musician
- (Argentina) Rosa Antonelli, pianist
- (Brazil) Antônio Meneses (born 1957), cellist

=== Classical ===
- Nelson Freire (born 1944–2021), classical pianist
- José Antonio Abreu (born 1939), pianist, conductor and composer
- Miguel del Águila (born 1957), composer
- Claudio Arrau (1903–1991), pianist
- Clara Ricciolini (1822-1869), ballet
- Daniel Barenboim (born 1942), pianist and conductor
- Agustín Barrios (1885–1944), guitarist and composer
- Teresa Carreño (1853–1917), pianist, conductor and composer
- Reynaldo Hahn (1874–1947), music, critic, conductor and composer
- Deborah Colker (born 1960), ballet dancer
- Eduardo Marturet (born 1953), conductor and composer
- Eduardo Mata (1942–1995), conductor and composer
- Juan Orrego Salas (1919–2019, composer
- Heitor Villa-Lobos (1887–1959), composer

Opera singers

- Paulo Szot, baritone
- Luigi Alva (1927–2025), tenor
- Fabiana Bravo (born 1969), soprano
- Antônio Carlos Gomes (1836–1896), opera composer
- Eduardo Brito (1906–1946), baritone
- José Cura (born 1962), tenor
- Juan Diego Flórez (born 1973), tenor
- Isabel Rubio Ricciolini (1792–1846), opera

=== Singers ===
- (Ecuador) (United States) Christina Aguilera (born 1980), pop/R&B singer-songwriter and actress
- (El Salvador) Álvaro Torres (born 1954), singer-songwriter
- (Brazil) Anitta (born 1993), singer-songwriter, actress, and dancer
- (Cuba) (United States) Desi Arnaz (1917–1986), salsa singer
- (Panama) Rubén Blades (born 1948), salsa singer
- (Brazil) Roberto Carlos (singer) (born 1941), singer-songwriter
- (Brazil) Cazuza (1958–1990), singer-songwriter
- (Argentina) Gustavo Cerati (1959–2014), alternative rock singer-songwriter
- (Cuba) (United States) Celia Cruz (1925–2003), salsa singer
- (Dominican Republic) (United States) Kat DeLuna (born 1987), singer
- (Argentina) Lali Espósito (born 1991), pop singer-songwriter
- (Cuba) (United States) Gloria Estefan (born 1957), singer-songwriter
- (Puerto Rico) José Feliciano (born 1945), singer-songwriter
- (Mexico) Juan Gabriel (1950–2016), ranchera and ballad singer-songwriter
- (Argentina) Charly García (born 1951), rock musician
- (Dominican Republic) Juan Luis Guerra (born 1957), singer-songwriter
- (Mexico) Pedro Infante (1917–1957), singer and actor
- (Chile) Víctor Jara (1932–1973), singer-songwriter
- (Colombia) Juanes (born 1972), singer-songwriter
- (Puerto Rico) (United States) Jennifer Lopez (born 1969), singer-songwriter, dancer, actress, producer
- (Mexico) Jorge Negrete (1911–1953), singer-songwriter
- (Argentina) Fito Páez (born 1961), singer-songwriter, producer and film director
- (Dominican Republic) (United States) Prince Royce (born 1989), singer-songwriter
- (Dominican Republic) Santaye, singer-songwriter
- (Brazil) Ivete Sangalo (born 1972), singer-songwriter
- (Brazil) Raul Seixas (1945–1989), composer, singer-songwriter and producer
- (Colombia) Shakira (born 1977), Latin pop singer-songwriter
- (Argentina) Luis Alberto Spinetta (1950–2012), singer-songwriter
- (Mexico) Lynda Thomas (born 1981), alternative rock and eurodance singer-songwriter
- (Colombia) Carlos Vives (born 1961), vallenato singer, composer and actor
- (Puerto Rico) (United States) Ricky Martin (born 1971), Latin pop singer-songwriter and actor
- (Puerto Rico) (United States) Bad Bunny (born 1994), reggaeton and Latin trap singer-songwriter
- (Cuba) (Mexico) (United States) Camila Cabello (born 1997), actor, singer-songwriter

== Philosophers and humanists ==
- Paulo Freire (1921–1997), philosopher
- Juan Bautista Alberdi (1810–1884), political theorist
- Andrés Bello (1781–1865), humanist, philosopher, educator and philologist
- Leonardo Boff (born 1938), early Liberation theologians
- Mario Bunge (1919–2020), philosopher
- Miguel Antonio Caro (1843–1909), humanist, linguist and politician
- Rufino José Cuervo (1844–1911), philologist and linguist
- Sérgio Buarque de Holanda (1802–1982), writer, journalist and sociologist
- Manuel DeLanda (born 1952), philosopher, professor
- Roberto Mangabeira Unger (born 1947), philosopher
- José Ingenieros (1877–1925), philosopher and sociologist
- Enrique Krauze (born 1947), historian, political and social essayist
- Humberto Maturana (1928–2021), proponent of embodied philosophy
- Ernesto Mayz Vallenilla (1925–2015), humanist, philosopher and educator
- Gilberto de Mello Freyre (1900–1987), sociologist, considered one of the most important sociologists of the 20th century
- Edmundo O'Gorman (1906–1995), philosopher
- Francisco Varela (1946–2001), proponent of embodied philosophy
- José Vasconcelos (1882–1959), thinker, educator and essayist
- Antonio Candido (1918–2017), writer, sociologist

== Science and technology ==
- (Brazil) Manuel de Abreu (1894–1962), physician and scientist
- (Brazil) Josué de Castro (1908–1973), physician
- (Brazil) Milton Santos (1926–2001), geographer
- (Brazil) Giuseppe Cilento (1923–1994), chemist
- (Brazil) Ivan Izquierdo (1937-2021), scientist
- (Argentina) Juan Martín Maldacena (born 1968), theoretical physicis
- (Argentina) Julio Navarro (astrophysicist) (born 1962), astrophysicist
- (Argentina) Luis Agote (1868–1954), physician and researcher
- (Argentina) Eugenia Kalnay (1942-2024), meteorologist
- (Argentina) Sandra Díaz (ecologist) (born 1961), ecologist
- (Puerto Rico) Ricardo Alegría (1921–2011), physical anthropologist
- (Brazil) Maurício Peixoto (1921–2019), engineer and mathematician
- (Argentina) Luis Caffarelli (born 1948), mathematician
- (Argentina) Eduardo Arzt (born 1953), molecular biologist
- (Argentina) Ana Belén Elgoyhen (born 1959), scientist
- (Brazil) Álvaro Alvim (1863–1928), physician
- (Brazil) Antonio Divino Moura, meteorologist
- (Brazil) Carolina Araujo, mathematician
- (Brazil) Artur Avila (born 1979), mathematician
- (Argentina) José Antonio Balseiro (1919–1962), nuclear physicist
- (Argentina) Gregorio Baro (1928–2012), radiochemist
- (Argentina) Eduardo D. Sontag (born 1951), mathematician
- (Brazil) Ana Bedran-Russo, clinician and scientist
- (Argentina) Amina Helmi (born 1970), astronomer
- (Argentina) Alberto Pedro Calderón (1920-1998), mathematician
- (Venezuela) (United States) Baruj Benacerraf (1920–2011), immunologist, Nobel Prize Medicine
- (Mexico) (United States) Martha E. Bernal (1931–2001), psychologist
- (Brazil) Fernando Brandão (born 1983), physicist and computer scientist
- Vital Brazil (1865–1950), physician, biomedical scientist and immunologist
- (Argentina) Jorge E. Galán, microbiologist
- (Argentina) Carlos Eduardo Kenig (born 1953), mathematician
- (Colombia) Francisco José de Caldas (1768–1818), naturalist, mathematician, geographer and inventor
- (Argentina) (United States) Fernando Caldeiro (born 1958), NASA astronaut
- (Puerto Rico) Víctor A. Carreño (1911–1967), NASA aerospace engineer
- (Mexico) Nabor Carrillo Flores (1911–1967), nuclear physicist
- (Brazil) Carlos Chagas (1879–1934), physician and scientist
- (Costa Rica) (United States) Franklin Chang Díaz (born 1950), NASA astronaut
- (Puerto Rico) Nitza Margarita Cintrón (born 1950), NASA Chief of Space and Health Care Systems
- (Brazil) Adelmar Faria Coimbra-Filho (1924–2016), biologist, primatologist
- (Venezuela) Jacinto Convit (1913–2014), medical scientist, discoverer of vaccines
- (Brazil) Newton da Costa (1929–2024), mathematician, logician, and philosopher
- (Brazil) Luís Cruls (1848–1908), astronomer and geodesist
- (Argentina) Armando J. Parodi (born 1942), glycobiologist
- (Brazil) Oswaldo Cruz (1872–1917), physician, bacteriologist, epidemiologist
- (Brazil) Johanna Döbereiner (born 1924), agronomist
- (Argentina) René Favaloro (1923–2000), cardiologist, created the technique for coronary bypass
- (Venezuela) Humberto Fernández-Morán (1924–1999), medical research scientist
- (Brazil) Sérgio Henrique Ferreira (1934–2016), physician and pharmacologist
- (Puerto Rico) Orlando Figueroa (born 1955), NASA Director for Mars Exploration and for Solar System Division
- (Cuba) Carlos Finlay (1833–1915), medical scientist, researcher
- (Brazil) Leopoldo Penna Franca (1959-2012), mathematician
- (Colombia) Julio Garavito Armero (1865–1920), astronomer
- (Brazil) Marcelo Gleiser (born 1959), physicist and astronomer
- (Brazil) Otto Richard Gottlieb (1920–2011), chemist and scientist
- (Brazil) José Goldemberg (born 1928), physicist
- (Mexico) Guillermo González Camarena (1917–1965), inventor of an early color television system
- (Brazil) Hilário de Gouvêa (1843–1929), ophthalmologist
- (Cuba) Juan Gundlach (1810–1896), naturalist, taxonomist
- (Brazil) Celso Grebogi (born 1947), theoretical physicist
- (Colombia) Salomón Hakim (1922–2011), physician and scientist
- (Mexico) Guillermo Haro (1913–1988), astrophysicist, specialist in observational astronomy
- (Argentina) Bernardo Houssay (1887–1971), physiologist, Nobel Prize in Physiology or Medicine
- (Mexico) Miguel de Icaza (born 1972), free software programmer
- (Brazil) Roberto Ierusalimschy (born 1960), computer scientist
- (Brazil) Madeleine M. Joullié (born March 29, 1927) organic chemist
- (Brazil) Warwick Estevam Kerr (1922–2018), agricultural engineer, geneticist, entomologist
- (Brazil) Roberto Landell de Moura (1861–1928), pioneer of telephony and radio
- (Brazil) César Lattes (1924–2005), experimental physicist
- (Argentina) Luis Federico Leloir (1906–1987), biochemist, Nobel Prize in Chemistry
- (Brazil) Maria Carmela Lico (1927–1985), physiologist
- (Argentina) Mariana Weissmann (born 1933), physicist
- (Brazil) Beatriz Barbuy (born 1950), astrophysicist
- (Brazil) Henrique da Rocha Lima (1879–1956), physician, pathologist and infectologist
- (Argentina) Domingo Liotta (1924–2022), cardiologist, created first artificial heart
- (Brazil) Rosaly Lopes (born 1957), planetary geologist, volcanologist
- (Brazil) Peter Wilhelm Lund (1801–1880), paleontologist, zoologist and archeologist
- (Brazil) Adolfo Lutz (1855–1940), epidemiologist
- (Brazil) Lúcia Mendonça Previato (born 1949), biologist
- (Chile) Humberto Maturana (1928–2021), biologist
- (Cuba) Arnaldo Tamayo Méndez (born 1942), USSR Space Program cosmonaut
- (Argentina) César Milstein (1927–2002), biochemist, Nobel Prize in Physiology or Medicine
- (Mexico) Luis E. Miramontes (1925–2004), chemist, co-inventor of the oral contraceptive
- (Mexico) Mario J. Molina (born 1943), chemist, Nobel Prize in Chemistry
- (Honduras) Salvador Moncada (born 1944), pharmacologist
- (Brazil) Nélio José Nicolai (1940–2017), electrotechnician
- (Brazil) Miguel Nicolelis(1961), pioneering work surrounding brain-computer interface
- Hermann Niemeyer (1919–1991), paediatrician and biochemist, pioneer of biochemistry in Chile
- (Mexico) Rodolfo Neri Vela (born 1952), Ph.D, NASA astronaut
- (Brazil) Belita Koiller, Physics
- (Brazil) Carlos Nobre (scientist) (born 1951), scientist and meteorologist
- (Peru) (United States) Carlos I. Noriega (born 1959), NASA astronaut
- (Puerto Rico) Antonia Novello (born 1944), 14th Surgeon General of the United States
- (Brazil) Ruth Sonntag Nussenzweig (1928–2018), immunologist
- (Brazil) Diltor Opromolla (1934–2004), physician and dermatologist
- (Colombia) Manuel Elkin Patarroyo (born 1947), pathologist, vaccines specialist
- (Brazil) Carlos Paz de Araújo, scientist and inventor
- (Brazil) Jacob Palis (1940–2025), mathematician
- (Dominican Republic) Feniosky Peña-Mora (born 1966), engineer and educator
- (Brazil) Sérgio Pereira da Silva Porto (1926–1979), physicist
- (Cuba) Felipe Poey (1799–1891), zoologist, specialist in ichthyology
- (Peru) Aracely Quispe Neira (born 1982), NASA senior astronautical engineer, professor, researcher
- (Brazil) Silvano Raia, surgeon
- (Argentina) Eduardo H. Rapoport (1927–2017), ecologist, biogeographer
- (Venezuela) L. Rafael Reif (born 1950), engineer, president of MIT
- (Spain) (Mexico) Andrés Manuel del Río (1764–1849), geologist, chemist
- (Brazil) Maurício Rocha e Silva (1910–1983), physician and pharmacologist
- (Puerto Rico) (United States) Helen Rodríguez Trías (1929–2001), pediatrician, early advocate for women's reproductive rights
- (Argentina) Alicia Dickenstein (born 1955) mathematician
- (El Salvador) (United States) Francisco Rubio (astronaut) (born 1975), NASA astronaut
- (Brazil) Oscar Sala (1922–2010), nuclear physicist
- (Brazil) Roberto Salmeron (1922–2020), electrical engineer and experimental nuclear physicist
- (Puerto Rico) Wilfredo Santa-Gómez (born 1949), psychiatrist
- (Dominican Republic) José Santana (economist) (born 1962), specialist in technology and development
- (Brazil) Alberto Santos-Dumont (1873–1932), aviation inventor
- (Brazil) Nise da Silveira (1905–1999), psychiatrist
- (Mexico) (United States) Sarah Stewart (cancer researcher) (1905–1976), microbiologist, discovered Polyomavirus
- (Chile) Klaus von Storch (born 1962), aerospace engineer
- (Brazil) Sérgio Trindade (1940–2020), chemical engineer and researcher
- (Chile) Pablo DT Valenzuela (born 1941), biotechnologist, co-founder of Chiron Corporation and Fundación Ciencias Para la Vida
- (Chile) Francisco Varela (1946–2001), biologist, co-author of the theory of autopoiesis
- (Mexico) (United States) Lydia Villa-Komaroff (born 1947), biologist, early Mexican American PhD in the sciences
- (Brazil) Euryclides de Jesus Zerbini (1912–1993), physician and cardiac surgeon

== Social scientists ==
- Celso Monteiro Furtado (1920–2004), economist
- Eugenio María de Hostos (1839–1903), sociologist and educator
- Miguel León-Portilla (1926–2019), cultural anthropologist and historian
- Milton Santos (1926–2001), human geographer and writer
- Hernando de Soto Polar (born 1941), economist
- Julio C. Tello (1880–1947), archeologist
- Lorenz Bruno Puntel (born 1935), philosopher

== Sports ==
=== Athletics to Cycling ===
Athletics

- (Mexico) Daniel Bautista (born 1952), Olympic race walk gold medalist
- (Brazil) Thiago Braz (born 1993), Olympic pole vault gold medalist
- (Argentina) Delfo Cabrera (1919–1981), Olympic marathon gold medalist
- (Mexico) Ernesto Canto (born 1959), race walk Olympic gold medalist and World Champion
- (Brazil) Joaquim Cruz (born 1963), Olympic 800m gold medalist
- (Brazil) Adhemar da Silva (1927–2001), Olympic 2x triple jump gold medalist
- (Cuba) Anier García (born 1976), Olympic 110 m hurdles gold medalist
- (Mexico) Raúl González (racewalker) (born 1952), Olympic gold medalist
- (Cuba) Alberto Juantorena (born 1950), Olympic 2x track gold medalist
- (Cuba) Iván Pedroso (born 1972), Olympic long jump gold medalist and 4x World Champion
- (Ecuador) Jefferson Pérez (born 1974), Olympic 2x race walk gold medalist and 4x World Champion
- (Cuba) Dayron Robles (born 1986), Olympic 110 m hurdles gold medalist
- (Panama) Irving Saladino (born 1983), Olympic gold medalist and World Champion
- (Dominican Republic) (United States) Félix Sánchez (born 1977), Olympic 400m hurdles gold medalist and 2x World Champion
- (Cuba) Javier Sotomayor (born 1967), Olympic high jump gold medalist and World Record holder
- (Argentina) Juan Carlos Zabala (1911–1983), Olympic marathon gold medalist

Baseball

- (Venezuela) Luis Aparicio (born 1934), Major League Baseball (MLB) shortstop, Baseball Hall of Fame
- (Venezuela) Miguel Cabrera (born 1983), MLB first baseman
- (Brazil) Yan Gomes (born 1987), Brazilian-American professional baseball catcher for the Chicago Cubs of Major League Baseball (MLB)
- (Puerto Rico) Roberto Clemente (1934–1972), MLB right fielder, Baseball Hall of Fame
- (Dominican Republic) Juan Marichal (born 1937), MLB pitcher, Baseball Hall of Fame
- (Nicaragua) Dennis Martínez (born 1955), MLB pitcher, first Latino to pitch a perfect game
- (Dominican Republic) Pedro Martínez (born 1971), MLB pitcher, 3x Cy Young Award winner
- (Dominican Republic) Sammy Sosa (born 1968), MLB right fielder, first Latino to hit 500 home runs
- (Dominican Republic) José Reyes (infielder) (born 1983), MLB player
- (Mexico) Fernando Valenzuela (born 1960), MLB pitcher

Basketball

- (Brazil) Oscar Schmidt (born 1958)
- (Brazil) Hortência Marcari (born 1959)
- (Puerto Rico) Carlos Arroyo (born 1979), National Basketball Association (NBA) point guard
- (Brazil) Leandro Barbosa (born 1982), NBA Champion
- (Puerto Rico) J. J. Barea (born 1984), NBA Champion
- (Argentina) Manu Ginóbili (born 1977), Olympic gold medalist, NBA 2x Champion
- (Dominican Republic) Al Horford (born 1986), NBA
- (Mexico) Horacio Llamas (born 1973), NBA
- (Mexico) Eduardo Nájera (born 1976), NBA
- (Puerto Rico) Butch Lee (born 1956), NBA Champion

Chess

- (Peru) Esteban Canal (1896–1981), International Master, honorary International Grandmaster
- (Cuba) José Raúl Capablanca (1888–1942), World Champion, International Grandmaster
- (Brazil) Henrique Costa Mecking (born 1952), Brazilian chess grandmaster

Cycling

- (Colombia) Santiago Botero (born 1972), World Time-Trial Champion
- (Brazil) Henrique Avancini (born 1989)

=== Combat sport ===
Boxing

- (Nicaragua) Rosendo Álvarez (born 1970), World Champion
- (Nicaragua) Alexis Argüello (born 1952), World Champion, International Boxing Hall of Fame
- (Argentina) Jorge Castro (boxer) (born 1967), World Champion
- (Mexico) Julio César Chávez (born 1962), World Champion in 3x weight divisions
- (Argentina) Juan Martin Coggi (born 1961), World Champion
- (Dominican Republic) Carlos Cruz (boxer) (1937–1970), World Champion
- (Puerto Rico) Carlos De León (1959–2020), World Champion
- (Panama) Roberto Durán (born 1951), World Champion in 4x weight divisions
- (Argentina) Víctor Galíndez (1948–1980), World Champion
- (Puerto Rico) Wilfredo Gómez (born 1956), World Champion
- (Brazil) Éder Jofre (born 1936), World Champion
- (Argentina) Santos Laciar (born 1959), World Champion
- (Cuba) (Mexico) Raúl Macías (1934–2009), World Champion
- (Peru) Kina Malpartida (born 1980), World Champion
- (Nicaragua) Ricardo Mayorga (born 1973), World Champion
- (Argentina) Carlos Monzón (1942–1995), World Champion
- (Mexico) José Luis Ramírez (born 1958), World Champion
- (Puerto Rico) John Ruiz (born 1972), World Champion
- (Mexico) Salvador Sánchez (1959-1982), World Champion
- (Puerto Rico) José Torres (1936–2009), World Champion
- (Puerto Rico) Félix Trinidad (born 1973), World Champion
- (Mexico) Canelo Álvarez (born 1990), World Champion

Mixed martial arts

- (Mexico) Jessica Aguilar (born 1980), World Champion
- (Brazil) José Aldo (born 1986), World Champion
- (Mexico) Brandon Moreno (born 1993), World Champion
- (Brazil) Cris Cyborg (born 1985), World Champion
- (Mexico) Alexa Grasso (born 1993), World Champion
- (Brazil) Amanda Nunes (born 1988), World Champion
- (Brazil) Alex Pereira (born 1986), World Champion
- (Mexico) Yair Rodríguez (born 1992), World Champion
- (Brazil) Anderson Silva (born 1975), World Champion

Draughts

- (Brazil) Lourival Mendes França (died 2012), world champion in draughts-64,(1993), International grandmaster (GMI) in draughts-64, International master (MI) in International draughts

=== Football to Volleyball ===
Football (soccer)

- (Uruguay) Edinson Cavani (born 1987)
- (Peru) Teófilo Cubillas (born 1949)
- (Argentina) Alfredo Di Stéfano (1926–2014), 5x Champions League winner with Real Madrid and 3x Ballon d’Or winner
- (Argentina) Diego Maradona (born 1960), co-winner FIFA Player of the 20th Century
- (Uruguay) Óscar Míguez (1927–2006)
- (Argentina) Lionel Messi (born 1987), 6x World Footballer of the Year
- (Brazil) Neymar (born 1992)
- (Brazil) Rivaldo (born 1972)
- (Brazil) Romário (born 1966)
- (Brazil) Ronaldinho (born 1980)
- (Brazil) Ronaldo (born 1976)
- (Brazil) Pelé (born 1940), co-winner FIFA Player of the 20th Century, Named athlete of the 20th century
- (Uruguay) Luis Suárez (born 1987)

Handball

- (Brazil) Eduarda Amorim (born 1986)
- (Brazil) Alexandra do Nascimento (born 1981)

Golf

- (Puerto Rico) Chi-Chi Rodríguez (born 1935), World Golf Hall of Famer
- (Brazil) Bento Assis 4 x World Champion US Kids Golf

Horse racing

- (Venezuela) Javier Castellano (born 1977), jockey, 3x U.S. Eclipse Award for Outstanding Jockey
- (Venezuela) Ramon Domínguez (born 1976), jockey, 3x U.S. Eclipse Award for Outstanding Jockey
- (Brazil) T. J. Pereira (born 1976)

Motor sports

- (Venezuela) Johnny Cecotto (born 1956), 2x Motorcycle World Champion
- (Brazil) Eric Granado (born 1996), He was the 2017 FIM CEV Moto2 European Championship winner
- (Argentina) Juan Manuel Fangio (1911–1995), 5x Formula One World Champion
- (Brazil) Emerson Fittipaldi (born 1946), 2x Formula One World Champion
- (Venezuela) Carlos Lavado (born 1956), 2x Motorcycle World Champion
- (Chile) Juan Zanelli (1906–1944), Le Mans and European Hill Climb and Formula One race winner
- (Colombia) Juan Pablo Montoya (born 1975), 1x CART Champion, 2x Indianapolis 500 winner, Formula One and NASCAR race winner
- (Brazil) Nelson Piquet (born 1952), 3x Formula One World Champion
- (Brazil) Ayrton Senna (1960–1994), 3x Formula One World Champion

Skateboarding

- (Brazil) Bob Burnquist (born 1976), better known as Bob is the most medalist in X Games history, with a total of 30 medals
- (Brazil) Letícia Bufoni (born 1993), considered one of the greatest names in the history of the sport

Surfing

- (Peru) Sofía Mulánovich (born 1983), 3x World Champion, Surfing Hall of Fame
- (Brazil) Phil Rajzman (born 1982), 2x World Champion
- (Brazil) Gabriel Medina (born 1993)
- (Brazil) Ítalo Ferreira (born 1994)
- (Brazil) Filipe Toledo (born 1995)
- (Brazil) Adriano de Souza (born 1987)

Tennis

- (Brazil) Maria Bueno (1939–2018), 19x Champion of Grand Slam events, International Tennis Hall of Fame
- (El Salvador) Rosemary Casals (born 1948), 12x Champion of Grand Slam events
- (Puerto Rico) Gigi Fernández (born 1964), 1x Champion of Grand Slam event
- (Dominican Republic) (United States) Mary Joe Fernández (born 1971), 2x Champion of Grand Slam events, 2 Olympic gold medals
- (Argentina) Gastón Gaudio (born 1978), 1x Champion of Grand Slam event
- (Ecuador) Andrés Gómez (born 1960), 1x Champion of Grand Slam event
- (Chile) Fernando González (born 1980), 2x Olympic medalist
- (Brazil) Gustavo Kuerten (born 1976), 1x Champion of Grand Slam event
- (Chile) Anita Lizana (1915–1994), 1x Champion of Grand Slam event, first Latin American to be ranked World Number One
- (Chile) Nicolás Massú (born 1979), 2x Olympic gold medals
- (Argentina) David Nalbandian (born 1982), Tennis Masters Champion
- (Peru) (United States) Alex Olmedo (1936–2020), 3x Champion of Grand Slam events
- (Mexico) Rafael Osuna (1938–1969), 4x Champion of Grand Slam events
- (Puerto Rico) Monica Puig (born 1993), Olympic gold medalist
- (Chile) Marcelo Ríos (born 1975), first Latín Américan man ranked World Number One in the ATP
- (Argentina) Gabriela Sabatini (born 1970), 2x Champion of Grand Slam events
- (Ecuador) (United States) Pancho Segura (1921–2017), International Tennis Hall of Fame
- (Argentina) Paola Suárez (born 1976), 1x Champion of Grand Slam event
- (Argentina) Guillermo Vilas (born 1952), 1x Champion of Grand Slam event

Volleyball

- (Brazil) Giba (born 1976)
- (Brazil) Fabiana Alvim (born 1976)
- (Brazil) Sérgio Santos (born 1975)
- (Brazil) Fofão (volleyball player) (born 1970)

== Writers ==
See also List of Latin American writers (by country).

=== A-L ===
- (Brazil) Paulo Coelho(born 1947), lyricist and novelist
- (Mexico) (Spain) Juan Ruiz de Alarcón (c. 1581–1639), dramatist
- (Chile) (United States) Isabel Allende (born 1942), best selling novelist
- (Dominican Republic) Arambilet (born 1957), created first Latin American story using computerized linetext/ASCII art
- (Dominican Republic) (United States) Julia Alvarez (born 1950), poet, novelist and essayist
- (Brazil) Jorge Amado (1912–2001), modernist writer
- (Peru) José María Arguedas (1911–1969), novelist
- (Argentina) Roberto Arlt (1900–1942), short-story writer, novelist, and playwright
- (Guatemala) Miguel Ángel Asturias (1899–1974), Nobel Prize in Literature
- (Uruguay) Mario Benedetti (1920–2009), novelist and poet
- (Argentina) Adolfo Bioy Casares (1914–1999), novelist, Cervantes Prize
- (Chile) Roberto Bolaño (1953–2003), novelist, Rómulo Gallegos Prize
- (Argentina) Jorge Luis Borges (1899–1986), Cervantes Prize
- (Puerto Rico) Giannina Braschi (born 1953), poet, novelist, and essayist
- (Peru) Alfredo Bryce (born 1939), novelist and short story writer
- (Brazil) Carlos Drummond de Andrade (1902–1987) poet and writer
- (Cuba) Guillermo Cabrera Infante (1929–2005), novelist and essayist, Cervantes Prize
- (Cuba) Alejo Carpentier (1904–1980), novelist and essayist, Cervantes Prize
- (Peru) (United States) Carlos Castaneda (1925–1998), New Age and Shamanism author
- (Argentina) Julio Cortázar (1914–1984), novelist and short story writer
- (Mexico) (Spain) Juana Inés de la Cruz (1648/1651–1695), poet and dramatist
- (Nicaragua) Rubén Darío (1867–1916), modernist poet
- (Puerto Rico) Virgilio Dávila (1869–1943), poet
- (Puerto Rico) Julia de Burgos (1914–1953), poet
- (Brazil) João Guimarães Rosa(1908-1967), novelist, considered by many to be the greatest Brazilian writer of the 20th century and a of the greatest of all time
- (Chile) Jorge Edwards (born 1931), Cervantes Prize
- (Mexico) Laura Esquivel (born 1950), novelist
- (Puerto Rico) Rosario Ferré (1938–2016), poet, novelist, and essayist
- (Mexico) Carlos Fuentes (1928–2012), novelist and essayist, Rómulo Gallegos Prize, Cervantes Prize and Prince of Asturias Award
- (Venezuela) Rómulo Gallegos (1884–1969), novelist
- (Brazil) João Cabral de Melo Neto (1920-1999), poet
- (Colombia) Gabriel García Márquez (1928–2014), novelist and journalist, Nobel Prize Laureate
- (Cuba) Nicolás Guillén (1902–1989), poet
- (Argentina) José Hernández (writer) (1834–1886), poet and journalist
- (Chile) Vicente Huidobro (1893–1948), poet, initiator of Creacionismo movement
- (Cuba) José Lezama Lima (1910–1976), novelist
- (Panama) Amelia Denis de Icaza (1836–1911), romantic poet
- (Brazil) Clarice Lispector (1925–1977), novelist
- (Puerto Rico) Luis Lloréns Torres (1878–1944), poet
- (Puerto Rico) Luis López Nieves (born 1950), best-selling novelist and tale writer
- (Cuba) Dulce María Loynaz (1902–1997), poet, Cervantes Prize Laureate
- (Argentina) Leopoldo Lugones (1874–1938), poet
- (Brazil) Mário de Andrade (1893–1945), poet, novelist, musicologist, art historian and critic, he was a pioneer of the field of ethnomusicology

=== M-Z ===
- (Argentina) Alejandra Pizarnik (born 1936), poet
- (Brazil) Machado de Assis (1839–1908), realist novelist, poet and short-story writer
- (Brazil) Monteiro Lobato (1882–1948), novelist and short story writer, One of the greatest names in children's literature of all time
- (Uruguay) (United States) Jorge Majfud (born 1970), novelist and essayist
- (Cuba) José Martí (1853–1895), poet and essayist
- (Brazil) Gregório de Matos (1636–1696), baroque poet
- (Dominican Republic) Leopoldo Minaya (born 1963), Cervantes Cultural Association Award
- Pedro Mir (1913–2000), poet and writer, Poet Laureate of Dominican Republic
- (Chile) Gabriela Mistral (1889–1957), poet, Nobel Prize
- (Guatemala) Augusto Monterroso (1921–2003), short story writer, Prince of Asturias Award
- (Argentina) Manuel Mujica Láinez (1910–1984), novelist, essayist, journalist and short story writer
- (Colombia) Álvaro Mutis (1923–2013), poet, novelist, and essayist, Cervantes Prize, Prince of Asturias Award
- (Brazil) Ana Maria Machado (born 1941), writer, She received the international Hans Christian Andersen Medal in 2000 for her "lasting contribution to children's literature"
- (Chile) Pablo Neruda (1904–1973), poet, Nobel Prize
- (Mexico) Amado Nervo (1870–1919), modernist poet
- (Uruguay) Juan Carlos Onetti (1909–1994), novelist and short-story writer, Cervantes Prize
- (Chile) Nicanor Parra (1914–2018), anti-poet
- (Mexico) Fernando del Paso (1935–2018), novelist, essayist and poet, Rómulo Gallegos Prize
- (Mexico) Octavio Paz (1914–1998), Cervantes Prize and Nobel Prize
- (Mexico) Sergio Pitol (1933–2018), novelist, short story writer and translator, Cervantes Prize
- (Mexico) Elena Poniatowska (born 1932), novelist
- (Argentina) Manuel Puig (1932–1990), novelist
- (Uruguay) Horacio Quiroga (1878–1937), short story writer
- (Colombia) José Eustasio Rivera (1888–1928), poet and novelist
- (Paraguay) Augusto Roa Bastos (1917–2005), novelist, Cervantes Prize
- (Chile) Gonzalo Rojas (born 1917), poet, Cervantes Prize
- (Mexico) Juan Rulfo (1917–1986), novelist, Prince of Asturias Award
- (Argentina) Ernesto Sabato (1911–2011), novelist and essayist, Cervantes Prize
- (Mexico) Jaime Sabines (1926–1999), poet
- (Argentina) Alfonsina Storni (1892–1938), postmodernist poet
- (Brazil) Lygia Fagundes Telles (1923–2022), novelist and short-story writer, Camoens Prize
- (Venezuela) Arturo Uslar Pietri (1906–2001), novelist, Prince of Asturias Award
- (Peru) César Vallejo (1892–1938), poet
- (Colombia) Fernando Vallejo (born 1942), novelist, Rómulo Gallegos Prize
- (Peru) (Spain) Mario Vargas Llosa (born 1936), novelist and essayist, Cervantes Prize, Nobel Prize
- (Peru) (Spain) Inca Garcilaso de la Vega (1539–1616), first mestizo author in Spanish language
- (Mexico) Xavier Villaurrutia (1903–1950), poet

== Others ==
- Silvia Renate Sommerlath (born 1943), Queen of Sweden
- Óscar González-Quevedo (1930–2019), parapsychologist
- Egon Albrecht-Lemke (1918–1944), Luftwaffe fighter pilot
- Luigi Cani (born 1970), skydiver
- Frei Galvão (1739–1822), saint
- Eike Batista (born 1956), businessman
- José Antonio Bowen (born 1952), jazz musician and college president
- Enrique Gratas (1944–2015), television journalist
- Chico Xavier (1910–2002), philanthropist and spiritist medium
- María Julia Mantilla (born 1983), Miss World 2004
- Graças Foster (born 1953), business person
- Denise Quiñones (born 1980), Miss Universe 2001
- Sebastião Salgado (born 1944), photographer
- Geraldo Rivera (born 1943), television journalist
- Amyr Klink (born 1955), explorer
- Mike Krieger (born 1986), entrepreneur and software engineer who co-founded Instagram
- Ricardo Salinas Pliego (born 1956), businessman
- Alex Kipman (born 1979), engineer
- Carlos Slim (born 1940), businessman and billionaire
- Gérard Moss (1955-2022), pilot
- Alex Atala (born 1968), cook
- Ademar José Gevaerd (1962–2022), ufologist
- Karol Meyer (born 1968), diver
- Maria da Conceição (d. 1798), alleged witch
- Roche Braziliano (1630–1671), pirate
- Eduardo Saverin (born 1982), co-founder of Facebook

== Lists by nationality ==
- (Argentina) Argentines
- (Bolivia) Bolivians
- (Brazil) Brazilians
- (Chile) Chileans
- (Colombia) Colombians
- (Costa Rica) Costa Ricans
- (Cuba) Cubans
- (Dominican Republic) Dominicans
- (Ecuador) Ecuadorians
- (Guatemala) Guatemalans
- (Honduras) Hondurans
- (Mexico) Mexicans
- (Nicaragua) Nicaraguans
- (Panama) Panamanians
- (Paraguay) Paraguayans
- (Peru) Peruvians
- (Puerto Rico) Puerto Ricans
- (El Salvador) Salvadorans
- (Uruguay) Uruguayans
- (Venezuela) Venezuelans
- (United Nations) List of people by nationality

== See also ==
- List of Hispanic and Latin American Britons
- List of Eastern Caribbean people
- List of Latin American Jews
- List of Hispanic and Latino Americans
