= Melody Time =

1948 film

- Theatrical release poster
- Directed by: Clyde Geronimi; Wilfred Jackson; Hamilton Luske; Jack Kinney
- Story by: Winston Hibler; Erdman Penner; Harry Reeves; Homer Brightman; Ken Anderson; Ted Sears; Joe Rinaldi; Bill Cottrell; Art Scott; Jesse Marsh; Bob Moore; John Walbridge
- Produced by: Walt Disney
- Starring: Roy Rogers; Dennis Day; The Andrews Sisters; Frances Langford; Freddy Martin; Ethel Smith; Buddy Clark; Fred Waring and the Pennsylvanians; Sons of the Pioneers; The Dinning Sisters; Jack Fina; Luana Patten; Bobby Driscoll
- Cinematography: Winton Hoch
- Edited by: Donald Halliday; Thomas Scott
- Music by: Eliot Daniel; Paul J. Smith; Ken Darby
- Production company: Walt Disney Productions
- Distributed by: RKO Radio Pictures
- Release date: May 27, 1948
- Running time: 76 minutes
- Country: United States
- Language: English
- Budget: $1.5 million
- Box office: $2.56 million (worldwide rentals)

Melody Time is a 1948 American musical anthology film produced by Walt Disney. It was released to theaters by RKO Radio Pictures on May 27, 1948. The live-action and animated film is made up of seven segments set to popular music and folk music, similar to Make Mine Music (1946) as well as Fantasia (1940). Melody Time received mixed-to-positive reviews.

== Vignettes ==
According to Disney, the film's plot is as follows: "In the grand tradition of Disney's greatest musical classics, such as FANTASIA, MELODY TIME features seven classic stories, each enhanced with high-spirited music and unforgettable characters...[A] feast for the eyes and ears [full of] wit and charm... a delightful Disney classic with something for everyone". Rose Pelswick, in a 1948 review for The News-Sentinel, described the film as an "adventure into the intriguing make-believe world peopled by Walt Disney's Cartoon characters". It also explains that "with the off-screen voice of Buddy Clark doing the introductions, the... episodes include fantasy, folklore, South American rhythms, poetry, and slapstick". A 1948 review by the Pittsburgh Post-Gazette described it as a "mixture of fantasy, abstraction, parable, music, color, and movement".

The seven "mini-musical" stories outlined:

=== Once Upon a Wintertime ===
This segment features Frances Langford singing the title song about two romantic young lovers on a winter day in December, during the late 19th century. The couple are Jenny and Joe (unlike most Disney cartoons, Jenny and Joe lack spoken dialogue). Joe shows off on the ice for Jenny, and near-tragedy and a timely rescue ensues. This is intertwined with a similar rabbit couple.

Like other segments of these package films, Once Upon a Wintertime was later released theatrically as an individual short, in this case on September 17, 1954.

=== Bumble Boogie ===
This segment presents a surrealistic battle for a solitary bumblebee as he tries to ward off a visual and musical frenzy. The music, courtesy of Freddy Martin and His Orchestra (with Jack Fina playing the piano), is a swing-jazz variation of Rimsky-Korsakov's Flight of the Bumblebee, which was one of the many pieces considered for inclusion in Fantasia.

=== The Legend of Johnny Appleseed ===
A retelling of the story of John Chapman, who spent most of his life roaming the Midwestern United States (mainly Ohio and Indiana) in the pioneer days, and planting apple trees, thus earning his famous nickname. He also spread Christianity. Dennis Day narrates (as an "old settler who knew Johnny well") and provides the voices of both Johnny and his guardian angel.

The segment was released independently on December 25, 1955, as Johnny Appleseed. The piece has a running time of "17 minutes [making it] the film's second-longest piece". Before being adapted for Melody Time, the story of Johnny Appleseed was "first immortalized around campfires", then later turned into "storybook form".

=== Little Toot ===
The story of Little Toot by Hardie Gramatky, in which the title protagonist, a small tugboat in New York City, wanted to be just like his father Big Toot, but could not seem to stay out of trouble.

The Andrews Sisters provide vocals. A clip features briefly in the "Friendship" song on Disney Sing Along Songs volume Friend Like Me. It was also featured in Sing Me a Story with Belle.

=== Trees ===
A recitation of the 1913 poem "Trees" by Joyce Kilmer, featuring music by Oscar Rasbach and performed by Fred Waring and the Pennsylvanians. The lyrical setting accompanies animation of bucolic scenes seen through the changing of the seasons, with an extended break between the sixth and seventh lines of the poem to accommodate a storm scene.

To preserve the look of the original story sketches, layout artist Ken O'Connor came up with the idea of using frosted cels and rendering the pastel images right onto the cel. Before being photographed each cel was laminated in clear lacquer to protect the pastel. The result was a look that had never been seen in animation before.

=== Blame It on the Samba ===
Donald Duck and José Carioca meet the Aracuan Bird, who introduces them to the pleasures of the samba. The accompanying music is the 1914 polka Apanhei-te, cavaquinho by Ernesto Nazareth, fitted with English lyrics.

The Dinning Sisters provide vocals while organist Ethel Smith appears in a live-action role.

=== Pecos Bill ===
The finale follows about Texas' famous hero Pecos Bill. Raised by coyotes, he became the biggest and best cowboy that ever lived. It also features his horse Widowmaker, who he saved from vultures that tried to eat him. He then goes on to become the most famous cowboy in folklore. It recounts the ill-fated romance between Bill and a beautiful cowgirl named Slue-Foot Sue, with whom he fell in love at first sight, which made Widowmaker so jealous of Sue that he caused her to get literally stranded on the moon on their wedding day. Heartbroken, Bill leaves civilization and rejoins the coyotes who now howl at the moon in honor of Bill's loss.

This retelling features Roy Rogers, Bob Nolan, the former's horse Trigger, and the Sons of the Pioneers telling the story to Bobby Driscoll and Luana Patten, all in a live-acted introduction set against animated backdrops before segueing into the animated story. The segment was later edited on the film's NTSC video release (sans the PAL release) to remove all shots with Bill smoking a cigarette and almost the entire tornado scene with Bill rolling his cigarette and lighting it with a lightning bolt. Both the cigarette and tornado scenes were restored when the film was released on Disney+. With a total running time of "22 minutes, [it] is the lengthiest piece".

== Cast ==
The cast is listed below:

- Roy Rogers – Himself; Narrator; Singer (Pecos Bill)
- Trigger, the Smartest Horse in the Movies – Himself
- Dennis Day – Narrator; Singer; Characters (Johnny Appleseed)
- The Andrews Sisters – Singers (Little Toot)
- Fred Waring and the Pennsylvanians – Singers (Trees)
- Freddy Martin – Music composer (Bumble Boogie)
- Ethel Smith – Organist (Blame It On the Samba)
- Frances Langford – Singer (Once Upon a Wintertime)
- Buddy Clark – Singer; Narrator
- Bob Nolan – Himself; Singer; Narrator (Pecos Bill)
- Sons of the Pioneers – Themselves; Singers; Narrators (Pecos Bill)
- The Dinning Sisters – Singers (Blame It On the Samba)
- Bobby Driscoll – Himself (Pecos Bill)
- Luana Patten – Herself (Pecos Bill)

Cast
Once Upon a Wintertime	Bumble Boogie	Johnny Appleseed	Little Toot	Trees	Blame It On the Samba	Pecos Bill
Frances Langford (Singer)	Freddy Martin (Music composer)	Dennis Day	The Andrews Sisters (Singers)	Fred Waring and His Pennsylvanians (Singers)	Ethel Smith and the Dinning Sisters (Singers)	Roy Rogers (Singer), Sons of Pioneers (Singers), Bob Nolan (Singer)

== Music ==
Melody Time

Soundtrack album by Eliot Daniel, Paul J. Smith and Ken Darby
- Released: 1948
- Label: Disneyland Records

The songs in Melody Time were all "largely based around (then) contemporary music and musical performances". "Blue Shadows on the Trail" was chosen by the Western Writers of America as one of the top 100 Western Songs of all time.

No.	Title	Writer(s)	Performer(s)	Length
1.	"Melody Time"	George David Weiss & Bennie Benjamin	Buddy Clark
2.	"Once Upon a Wintertime"	Bobby Worth & Ray Gilbert	Frances Langford	7:22
3.	"Bumble Boogie"	Nikolai Rimsky-Korsakov (writer), Jack Fina (arranger)	Freddy Martin and His Orchestra & Jack Fina (piano)
4.	"Johnny Appleseed"	Kim Gannon & Walter Kent	Dennis Day
5.	"Little Toot"	Allie Wrubel	The Andrews Sisters
6.	"Trees"	Joyce Kilmer (poem) & Oscar Rasbach (music)	Fred Waring and His Pennsylvanians
7.	"Blame It on the Samba"	Ernesto Nazareth & Ray Gilbert	Ethel Smith & The Dinning Sisters
8.	"Pecos Bill"	Eliot Daniel & Johnny Lange	Roy Rogers & The Sons of the Pioneers
9.	"Blue Shadows on the Trail"	Eliot Daniel & Johnny Lange	Roy Rogers & The Sons of the Pioneers

== Production ==
In late 1947, Disney announced he would be releasing a "regrouping of various cartoons at his studio under two titles, Melody Time and Two Fabulous Characters", to be released in August 1948 and 1949, respectively. Melody Time ended up being released a few months earlier than planned, in May.

Melody Time is considered to be the last anthology film made by Walt Disney Productions (the next film to be released was The Adventures of Ichabod and Mr. Toad, which featured two stories). These package features were "little-known short-film compilations that Disney produced and released as feature films during and after World War II". They were "financially (and artistically) lightweight productions meant to bring in profits [to allow the studio to] return to fairy tale single-narrative feature form", an endeavour which they successfully completed two years later with Cinderella. While the shorts "contrast in length, form, and style", a common thread throughout is that each "is accompanied by song[s] from musicians and vocalists of the '40s" – both popular and folk music. This sets it apart from the similarly structured Fantasia, whose segments were set to classical music instead. As opposed to Fun and Fancy Free, whose story was bound to the tales of Bongo and Mickey and the Beanstalk, in this film "Walt Disney has let his animators and his color magicians have free rein".

Melody Time was the last film The Andrews Sisters took part in. They sang throughout the 10-minute segment known as Little Toot. Andrews Sisters member Maxine said: "It was quite an experience. On the wall at the studio they had the whole story in picture form. Two songwriters played the score and Walt Disney explained it to us. It was a new thing for Disney. We sang the narrative. It was very exciting to work with Disney—he was such a gentleman".

Favorite Disney juvenile actors Bobby Driscoll and Luana Patten, who also starred in Song of the South and So Dear to My Heart, appear in the last sequence as the two children who hear the story of Pecos Bill.

Melody Time was the last feature film to include Donald Duck and José Carioca until the 1988 Touchstone Pictures film Who Framed Roger Rabbit.

== Release ==
The film was originally released in USA, Brazil, and Argentina in 1948, in 1949 in Australia and in 1950 in Mexico and Uruguay. From December 1948 (UK) to 15 September 1954 (Denmark) the film was released across Europe. The film was known by a variety of names including Време за музика in Bulgaria, Mélodie cocktail in France, Musik, Tanz und Rhythmus in Germany, and Säveltuokio in Finland.

Disney later released a package film entitled Music Land, a nine-segment film which "recycled sequences from both Make Mine Music and Melody Time". Five selections were from Melody Time while another was the short Two For the Record, which consisted of two segments produced under Benny Goodman's direction.

Melody Time was unusual in that, until 1998 (50 years after its initial release), it remained "one of the handful of Disney's animated features yet to be released on videocassette". Some of the segments "have been re-released as featurettes", and Once Upon a Wintertime has "been included on other Disney video cartoon compilations".

=== Home media ===
Melody Time was first released on January 25, 1987, in Japan, on Laserdisc, and then on VHS on June 2, 1998, under the Walt Disney Masterpiece Collection title. This THX certified VHS was the first American home video release of the film itself, premiering in time for its 50th anniversary.

Prior to its 1998 home video debut in the US, in part of the Walt Disney Masterpiece Collection, Once Upon A Wintertime was featured on the VHS, A Walt Disney Christmas, Little Toot on Storybook Classics, Blame It On The Samba on The Wonderful World of Disney: Music for Everybody and Pecos Bill on the American Heroes VHS paired with Paul Bunyan.

On June 6, 2000, Melody Time was released on VHS and DVD as part of the Walt Disney Gold Classic Collection. However, in the Region 1 DVD release all scenes of smoking were digitally removed in the Pecos Bill segment while the Region 2 release in Europe leaves those scenes unaltered. The movie was left uncut, with smoking scenes intact, when it was included on the Disney+ streaming service. It was released on Blu-Ray, exclusive to the Disney Movie Club, on November 2, 2021, also uncut and unaltered.

=== Marketing ===
RKO supported the film's release with a nationwide promotional campaign that included radio promotion, newspaper and trade-paper advertising, and theatrical publicity. The film's New York engagement at the Astor Theatre was accompanied by additional music-oriented promotion in Times Square, including broadcasts of songs from the film and cooperation with local record stores. Contemporary promotional material emphasized the film's seven musical numbers and performers and advertised its Astor Theatre engagement.

1948 promotional folder for Melody Time, advertising the film's engagement at the Astor Theatre in New York.

The various taglines of the film were: "For Your All-Time Good Time!", "7 Hit Songs! 11 Musical Stars!", and "Walt Disney's Great New Musical Comedy".

Collectible items for the film include books, figures, and posters.

== Reception ==
=== Critical reception ===
==== Contemporary reviews ====
At the time of its release, the film received "generally unfavorable" reviews. However, Disney Discourse: Producing the Magic Kingdom notes that an article in Time Magazine around that time "celebrated the global scope of the Disney product", and a 1948 review for The News-Sentinel said the "charm and skill" that one had to expect from Disney is "delightful entertainment" for all children. A 1948 review of the film for the Los Angeles Times said the "acts" Johnny Appleseed and Pecos Bill, which the "new variety show from Walt Disney [gave] special attention to" are "'human' sagas" and as a result "more endearing" than the rest of the segments. The Andrews Sisters: A Biography and Career Record notes that "the public liked the film and it was a box-office success".

A 1948 review by the Pittsburgh Post-Gazette said the film was a "visual and auditory delight" and added that if Disney were able to reach his audience's other senses, "there's no doubt he'd be able to please them too". It says a "tuneful and functional soundtrack rounds out the Disney art". It said that Bumble Boogie "reverted back to fantasia-like interpretive technique". It also notes that the abstraction ends after Trees, and the final three shorts are "story-sequences". It says the simple story of Johnny Appleseed is done with "touching perception". It said Little Toot "is destined to become a fable of our time" and adds "the Andrews Sisters tell the story in lilting song". The review ended with the author saying "deserving accolades will go to [Walt Disney] and his whole production staff, as well as to the staff whose voices he has used as well".

A 1948 review of the film for The News-Sentinel described Pecos Bill as the best segment, and said it "caused a stir among the small fry in the audience".

==== Retrospective reviews ====
Later reviews are more mixed, noting the film's faults, but also praising it for various technical achievements.

DVDizzy notes that in regard to the mix of shorts and 1940s music, "the marriage often does not work, and the melodies are not particularly the film's forte"; however, it adds that this is a modern-day opinion, and that paying audiences at the time the film was released probably "felt better about the music". The site then reviewed each segment in turn, saying: Once Upon a Wintertime is "physical slapstick" that doesn't match the "dramatic singing by Frances Langford", Bumble Boogie is "fun but forgettable", The Legend of Johnny Appleseed is the "most enjoyable" of the segments, Little Toot is "rather generic", Trees features "some nice imagery", Blame it on the Samba "involve[s] Latin dancing and nothing more", and Pecos Bill has "Disney...go[ing] back and us[ing] today's technology to alter [Bill's smoking,] what admittedly is a minor point in one short of a film that's predominantly going to be watched and purchased by animation enthusiasts/historians". It explains the "video quality is consistently satisfying" and that the "audio has the dated feel of other '40s Disney films".

The film received a score of 77.06 out of 100 based on 50 votes, on the site Disney Movies Guide.

In his book The Animated Movie Guide, Jerry Beck gave Melody Time a rating of 2/5 stars, and described the film as "odds and ends from a studio geared up towards revival". He said that by this time the post-war formula of releasing anthologies had become "tired", with only a few of the segments being interesting, and feeling as if the animators kept "pushing for something more creative to do". He commented that the film, a "vast underachievement" for Disney, felt dated like its predecessor Make Mine Music, and added that he found it hard to believe that the artists who made this film had also made Pinocchio eight years before. He praised the "exceptional designs and palettes" by stylist Mary Blair, including the "flat styli[s]ed backgrounds" of Wintertime, and the Impressionist painting/folk art look of The Legend of Johnny Appleseed. He highlighted the "slapstick...impressive montage of Bill's impressive feats" as a "true treat". He described the "manic interpretation" of Flight of the Bumblebee known as Bumble Boogie, in which a bee terrorized by musical instruments and notes "change[s] colors and outlines from one moment to the next as the backgrounds seamlessly dissolve, change or morph around him", as "Disney's best piece of surrealism since the 'Pink Elephant on Parade' sequence in Dumbo". He also spoke about the "stellar special effects" involved in the dynamite exploding Ethel Smith's organ instrument, in the segment Blame it on the Samba. However, he added that the rest of Melody Time was "sad[ly]...forgettable".

In The Magic Kingdom: Walt Disney and the American Way of Life, Steven Watts explains that while Pecos Bill "recaptured some of the old magic", the film as a whole, along with the other "halfhearted...pastiche[s] of short subjects", came across as "animated shorts surrounded with considerable filler and stuff into a concocted package". He adds that as a result they "never caught fire" due to their "varying wildly in quality", with moments of creativity being outweighed by the "insipid, mediocre, stale stretches of work".

The authors of The Cartoon Music Book said Melody Time was "much better" than the other post-Fantasia Disney package films of the era, adding that it was "beautifully designed and scored", paving the way for the "'populuxe' style" of Disney's first renaissance (starting with Cinderella in 1950). They stated that Trees and Blame it on the Samba (which they described as a "psychedelic Latin American sequence") are "charming, if still obscure, entries in the Disney pop song catalog[ue]".

The Andrews Sisters: A Biography and Career Record author H. Arlo Nimmo said "in general, [the Andrews Sisters-sung] Melody Time holds up well, and the story of 'Little Toot' is as appealing to today as when it originally appeared fifty-some years ago". He described the singing as "unremarkable but narrat[ing] the...story cleverly". He adds Variety's quote: "'Little Toot,'...is colorful and engrossing. Andrews Sisters give it popular vocal interpretation", and said that although The New York Times preferred the film to Make Mine Music the newspaper added "The Andrews Sisters sing the story...not very excitingly". He also included Metronome's indifferent comment: "The Andrews Sisters sing a silly song about a tugboat". The article The Walt Disney Classics Collection Gets "Twitterpatted" For Spring deemed Little Toot one of Melody Time's highlights.

In a review of the 2004 Disney film Home on the Range, the article "Frisky 'Range' doesn't measure up: Disney delivers fun" said that the "sendup of the Wild West...has some fitful comic vitality and charm - [but] it can't hold a candle to the 'Pecos Bill' segment of the studio's late-'40s anthology, 'Melody Time'".

Rotten Tomatoes reported that 75% of 12 critics have given the film a positive review, with an average score of 6.9/10. The critical consensus reads, "Melody Time is a charming musical anthology film that's expertly crafted and filled with high-spirited numbers."

A 1998 Chicago Tribune review of the film, in honor of its VHS release, described the film as a "sweet, old-fashioned delight and one of the few Disney animated films that pre-schoolers can watch alone without danger of being traumatized", but also added that the younger generation might be bored by it, as they are "attuned to the faster, hipper rhythms of the post-'Mermaid' era".

Beck considers the segment "Blame It on the Samba" to be the best "Good Neighbor" Disney film there is, stating that "it blows my mind every time I watch it." Film historian J.B. Kaufman has noted that the segment is a cult favorite among Disney fans.

=== Box office ===
The film returned rentals to RKO by 1951 of $2,560,000 with $1,810,000 being generated in the U.S. and Canada.

== Controversy ==
Due to the controversy surrounding the smoking in Pecos Bill, the segment was "heavily edited" when the film was released onto VHS in 1998. While the character of Bill is shown "smoking a cigarette in several sequences", the edited version cuts these scenes, "resulting in the removal of almost the entire tornado sequence, and [creating] some odd hand and mouth movements for Bill throughout". In a review at DVDizzy, it is noted that if one has an interest in the shorts, one will "probably be upset to know that Disney has decided to digitally edit out contents of the 50-plus-year-old frames of animation". In the Melody Time section of the Your Guide To Disney's 50 Animated Features feature at Empire Online, the review said of the editing: "at least, it was [done] for the US releases, but not for the rest of the world. Go figure." The scenes are removed on the Gold Collection DVD release although the Japanese laserdisc and the version of the DVD released in the United Kingdom are uncut. For the first time in 80 years, the uncut version with Pecos Bill's cigarette can now be seen on Disney+, alongside a Disney Movie Club exclusive Blu-ray, released on November 2, 2021.

According to a source, upon reviewing the music that Ken Darby had composed for Johnny Appleseed, Walt Disney "scorned the music", describing it as "like New Deal music". Darby was "enraged", and said to Disney "THAT is just a cross-section of one man's opinion!". Darby was only employed at The Walt Disney Company for a short while after this supposed incident.

Jerry Beck, in his book The Animated Movie Guide, comments on a risqué joke in Pecos Bill that somehow made it past the censors, when Bill kisses Sue and his guns rise from their holsters and begin to fire by themselves, simulating ejaculation. He adds jokingly that "perhaps Roy Rogers was covering the eyes of Bobby Driscoll and Luana Patten during this scene".

== Legacy ==
Many of the seven segments were later released as shorts, and some of them became "more successful than the original film". Bumble Boogie was among the few segments to receive huge popularity upon individual release. The article The Walt Disney Classics Collection Gets "Twitterpatted" For Spring notes that "the Little Toot segment of the film was so popular that it was re-released on its own as a short cartoon in 1954, and was subsequently featured on Walt Disney's popular weekly television series".

There are many references to the Pecos Bill segment in the Frontierland part of Magic Kingdom: there is a sign of Bill outside the Pecos Bill Tall Tale Inn and Cafe, as well as various images of him, the other characters, and their accessories around the cafe. A pair of gloves with the inscription "To Billy, All My Love, Slue Foot Sue" is located in a glass display case. In the World of Disney, Jose Carioca from Blame it on the Samba appears in a mural on the ceiling among many other characters. In a glass case, behind the windows of the All-Star Movies, there is a script for Melody Time.

== See also ==
- 1948 in film
- List of American films of 1948
- List of Walt Disney Pictures films
- List of Disney theatrical animated features
- List of animated feature films of the 1940s
- List of highest-grossing animated films
- List of package films
- Tall Tale: The Unbelievable Adventures of Pecos Bill (1995)
