= Inah Machado Sandoval =

Brazilian composer and pianist (1906–2003)

Inah Machado Sandoval (27 May 1906 - 30 July 2003), also known as "Tia Inah" or Aunt Inah, was a Brazilian composer and pianist. She composed more than 150 choros, waltzes, Brazilian tangos, mazurcas, and other salon genres for piano. In 1977, her choro for piano Soneca was one of the finalists of the first "Festival Nacional do Choro - Brasileirinho", sponsored by the Brazilian TV network Bandeirantes, among 1,200 entries. Her works were influenced by the musical styles of Ernesto Nazareth, Marcello Tupynambá, Eduardo Souto, Francisco Mignone, and Frederic Chopin.

The scores of all her piano works are currently available for download at the Instituto Piano Brasileiro after they were donated by her nephew, Cesario Ramos Machado in 2016.

== Discography ==
- Especiarias do Piano Paulista. Echo 199

Contains walzes and choros, including the set Branca de Neve, (Snow White). Fábio Caramuru (pf), Chica Brother (perc), Edson José Alves (gt), José Ananias (fl), Daniel Cornejo (cl), Sérgio Bizetti (acord).

- Chôro Novo, Disco 2 (LP). Discos Marcus Pereira, MPL-9373
