= Odeon (Nazareth) =

1909 Brazilian tango by Ernesto Nazareth

- Brazilian tango by Ernesto Nazareth
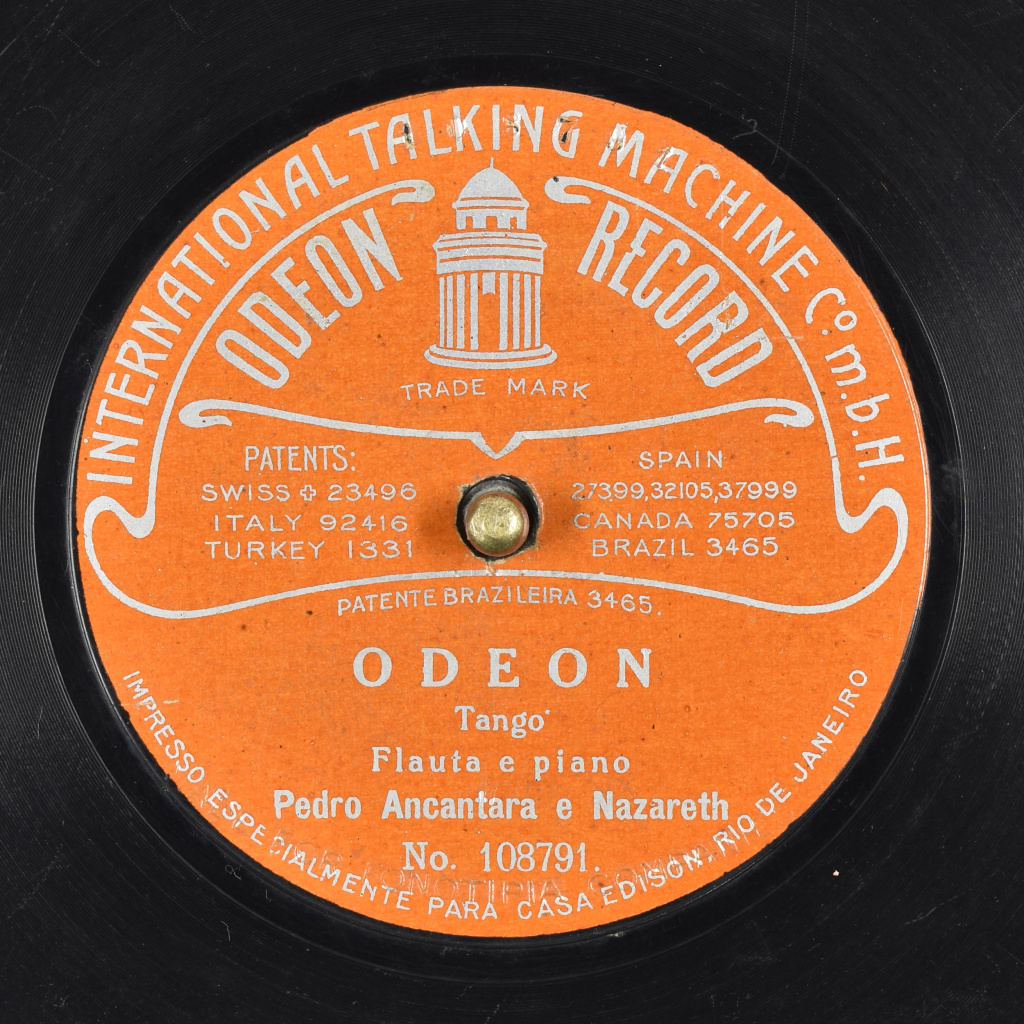
- Key: C♯ minor
- Form: Brazilian tango (choro)
- Composed: 1909
- Dedication: To the distinguished company Zambelly & Co.
- Published: 1909, Rio de Janeiro
- Publisher: Casa Mozart
- Recorded: 1912, Rio de Janeiro
- Duration: 3 minutes
- 1913 recording, performed by Ernesto Nazareth (piano) and Pedro de Alcântara (flute)

"Odeon" is a Brazilian Tango originally written for piano by Brazilian composer Ernesto Nazareth. Written in 1909, it is arguably the composer's most popular work.

== Composition ==
The title of the piece refers to the Odeon Cinema in Rio de Janeiro, a movie theater where the composer worked in the early 1900s. It was dedicated "to the distinguished company Zambelli & Co.", the owners of the Odeon Cinema. Nazareth often performed in the cinema's waiting area and became one of its main attractions, with many visitors coming specifically to hear him play—sometimes even skipping the films.

Odeon was not particularly well known during Nazareth's lifetime. He published it himself through Casa Mozart in 1909, funding the edition out of his own pocket. The piece was later recorded in 1912 in an arrangement for flute and piano, performed by Nazareth and flutist Pedro de Alcântara. After that, "Odeon" came to be seen as a minor work in his catalog, even though Nazareth played it many times during his São Paulo tour in 1926–1927, as well as in Rio.

It wasn't until after the composer's death that the piece began to gain widespread popularity, especially following the addition of lyrics by poet Vinicius de Moraes in the 1960s. An earlier set of lyrics by Hubaldo Maurício received less attention. As of 2012, "Odeon" had been recorded over 300 times. Although Nazareth was the sole composer, it is not uncommon to see Ubaldo Sciangula Mangione mistakenly credited as co-author in some sources, as the publishing rights to "Odeon" were transferred to Estevam Sciangula Mangione upon the composer's death.

== Structure ==
The form of "Odeon" is marked by the composer as a "Brazilian tango". However, if is generally recognized as a choro, as it is often performed and recorded by musicians within the choro tradition. As in many other tangos and choros, the structure is A–B–A–C–A (the C section being a trio). No tempo marking is specified in the manuscript. However, the expression marking in the first edition specifies that it should be played "gingando" (swaying) and the trio is meant to be played "com brilho" (with brightness). As opposed to many other choros by Nazareth, it is the left hand that carries the melody in the main theme (section A), whereas the right hand plays chords on top.

The piece is in C♯ minor. However, both the B and C sections are in the relative E major. Both in the manuscript and in the first recording made public by Nazareth, the structure is A–B–A–C–A–B–A – however, this unconventional structure is not present in any of the published editions of the piece. The dynamics of the piece are generally f, even though it ranges from mf to ff. It has 55 bars, not counting repetitions.

== Recordings ==
"Odeon" has been recorded more than 300 times by many musicians from different countries. The following is a partial list of some notable recordings of the piece:

Recordings of Nazareth's "Odeon"
Piano	Recording date	Release date	Record label	References
Ernesto Nazareth	Unknown	1913	Odeon Records	
Joshua Rifkin	August 1990	1991	Decca Records	
Iara Behs	November 2003	2004	Naxos Records	
Rosa Antonelli	2012	2012	Albany Records	
