= Milton Santos =

Brazilian geographer (1926–2001)

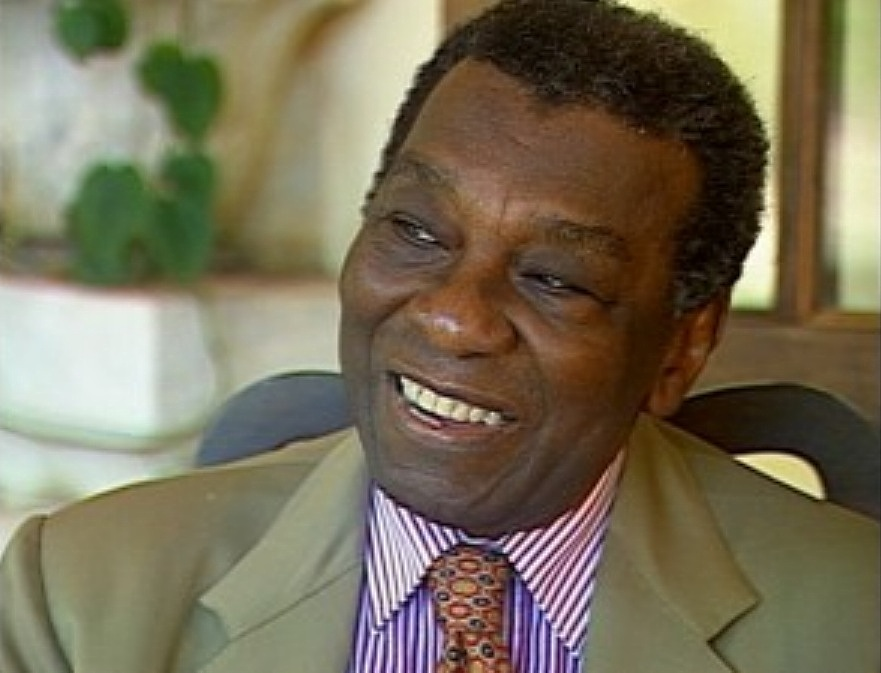
- Born: 3 May 1926; Brotas de Macaúbas, Bahia, Brazil
- Died: 24 June 2001 (aged 75); São Paulo, Brazil
- Education: Universidade Federal da Bahia, University of Strasbourg
- Scientific career
- Fields: Human geography, Critical geography, Urban studies

Milton Almeida dos Santos (May 3, 1926 – June 24, 2001) was a Brazilian geographer and geography scholar who had a degree in law. He became known for his pioneering works in several branches of geography, notably urban development in developing countries. He is considered the father of critical geography in Brazil. Santos was a recipient of the Vautrin Lud Prize, often seen as geography's equivalent of the Nobel Prize, and a posthumous recipient of the Anísio Teixeira Award, given every five years by CAPES (the Brazilian agency for the improvement of higher education personnel) to distinguished contributors to research and development in the country.

== Biography ==
Santos was born in Brotas de Macaúbas, Bahia, Brazil on May 3, 1926. His parents were elementary school teachers who home-schooled him. His Black paternal grandfather had been formerly enslaved. By the time Santos was eight, he was through with his elementary education. From 1934 to 1936, he lived in Alcobaça, where he went to study French and "good manners".

Santos taught geography and math to fellow high-school students in order to finance his pre-law in Salvador. He graduated in law from the Federal University of Bahia but decided not to practice, becoming instead a high-school geography teacher in Ilhéus. There, he met and married his first wife Jandira, who gave birth to their son Milton filho. Also in Ilhéus, Santos worked on the side as a journalist for the A Tarde newspaper.

Santos studied and taught in Europe, the Americas, and Africa. He completed his PhD at the University of Strasbourg in 1958 under Jean Tricart. Prior to being exiled by the Brazilian military dictatorship, he was forbidden to leave the country and could do so only after a negotiation between the French ambassador and the government. He managed to turn an otherwise painful thirteen-year exile into a successful international career. He lived in Bordeaux and Toulouse, where he met geography student Hélène, who was to become his second wife and give birth to son Rafael. He also taught in Paris at the Sorbonne, Toronto and the MIT, where he collaborated with Noam Chomsky.

Santos wrote more than forty books, all told, in several languages. His works became a reference for those interested in understanding geography from a critical point of view (if not necessarily in a negative light), especially by applying concepts of the Frankfurt School. His main concerns were connected on the one hand to city structure, urban networks and urbanisation processes in developing nations; and on the other hand, to the epistemology of geography (which means, its object and relationship to other sciences, such as economics and ethnography). His views about space helped geography transition from a concept of space as a stage for human action to a constraint on human action.

His works include "Por uma Geografia Nova" (For a New Geography) (1978) and "A natureza do espaço" (The Nature of Space) (1996). His work "O espaço dividido" (The Shared Space), in which Santos develops a theory of urban development in developing countries, is considered a geography classic.

In 1994, Santos was awarded the Vautrin Lud Prize, the highest prize in geography. The Prize is modeled after the Nobel Prize and colloquially called the Nobel Prize for geography. To date, Santos remains the only Latin-American scholar to ever win it.

Santos died in São Paulo, on June 24, 2001, at age 75, as a result of prostate cancer diagnosed about seven years earlier. His work continues to be relevant to ongoing debates about the future of geography as a discipline. As such, his work "The Active Role of Geography: A Manifesto" was translated to English and published by Antipode in 2017.

On 1 October 2018, search engine Google celebrated Milton Santos with a Doodle.

== Major works ==
- Santos, M. (1948). O povoamento da Bahia: Suas causas econômicas. Salvador: Imprensa Oficial da Bahia.
- Santos, M. (1953). Estudos sobre geografia. Salvador: Tipografia Manú.
- Santos, M. (1960). Marianne em Preto e Branco. Salvador: Livraria Progresso Editora.
- Santos, M. (1965). A cidade nos países subdesenvolvidos. Rio de Janeiro: Civilização Brasileira.
- Santos, M. (1974). Geography, Marxism and underdevelopment. Antipode, 6(3), 1–9.
- Santos, M. (1975). L’espace partagé: Les deux circuits de l’economie urbaine des pays sous- developpes. Paris: M.-Th. Génin, Librairies Techniques.
- Santos, M. (1979). The shared space: The two circuits of the urban economy in underdeveloped countries. London and New York, Methuen.
- Santos, M., M. A. de Souza & M. L. Silveira (Eds.), Território: Globalização e fragmentação. São Paulo: Hucitec and ANPUR.
- Santos, M. (1990). Metrópole corporativa fragmentada: o caso de São Paulo. São Paulo: Nobel.
- Santos, M. (1990). Espace et Méthode. Paris: Publisud.
- Santos, M. (1993, 1998). A Urbanização Brasileira. São Paulo: Hucitec.
- Santos, M. (1994). Por uma economia política da Cidade, São Paulo: Hucitec.
- Santos, M. (1996a). A Natureza do espaço. Técnica e tempo. Razão e emoção. São Paulo: Hucitec. TRans: (1997) La Nature de l'Espace. Technique et Temp. Raison et Émotion. Paris: L'Harmattan. Trans: (2000) La Naturaleza del Espacio. Técnica y Tiempo. Razón y Emoción. Barcelona: Ariel. Trans: Santos, M., & BALETTI, B. (2021). The Nature of Space. Duke University Press.
- Santos, M. (2000a). Por uma outra globalização: Do pensamento único à consciência universal. Rio de Janeiro: Record. Trans. Santos, M. (2017). Toward an other globalization: From the single thought to universal conscience. Translated by L. Melgaço and T. Clarke. Cham: Springer.
- Santos M with Bernardes A, Zerbini A, Gomes C, Bicudo E, Almeida E, Betioli Contei F, Grimm F, Nobre G, Antongiovanni L, Bueno Pinheiro M, Xavier M, Silveira M L, Montenegro M, Ferreira da Rocha M, Arroyo M, Borin P, Ramos S and de Lima Belo V (2000) O Papel Ativo da Geografia: Um Manifesto. Revista Território 5(9):103–109 https://www.ub.edu/geocrit/b3w-270.htm (last accessed 12 September 2025). Trans: Melgaço, Lucas. (2017). The Active Role of Geography: A Manifesto (By Santos et al. Translated by Tim Clarke and Lucas Melgaço). Antipode. 10.1111/anti.12318.
- Santos, M. (2004 [1978, 1990]). Por uma geografia nova. São Paulo: Edusp. Trans: (2021) For a New Geography. University of Minnesota Press.
- Santos, M., & Silveira, M. L. (2001). O Brasil: Território e sociedade no início do século XXI. Rio de Janeiro: Record. https://archive.org/details/obrasilterritr00sant

== See also ==
- Afro-Brazilians
- Marxist geography
- Vautrin Lud Prize
