= Apanhei-te, cavaquinho =

1914 polka for piano by Ernesto Nazareth

Apanhei-te, Cavaquinho
- by Ernesto Nazareth
- English: Caught You, Cavaquinho
- Native name: Apanhei-te, Cavaquinho
- Key: G major
- Genre: Polka
- Composed: 1914: Rio de Janeiro, Brazil
- Published: 1914: Rio de Janeiro, Brazil
- Scoring: Solo piano
- Dedicated to Juracy Nazareth de Araújo

"Apanhei-te, cavaquinho" (Portuguese for "Caught You, Cavaquinho") is a polka originally written for piano by Brazilian composer Ernesto Nazareth. One of the most popular pieces by Nazareth, it was finished around 1914.

== Composition ==
This polka was written at a time when Nazareth was already an accomplished composer and performer in his hometown, Rio de Janeiro. The piece, finished around 1914, was created when he was a pianist at the Odeon Cinema in Rio, a job he held from 1910 to 1918. As was customary for Nazareth, he got it published as soon as it was completed under Casa Mozart in 1914. It was dedicated "to my distinguished and close friend Juracy Nazareth de Araújo", an amateur composer.

== Structure ==
"Apanhei-te, cavaquinho" follows the structure of a short polka with a duration of 2 to 3 minutes. Nazareth stated that it is "muito própria pra serenatas" (very well suited for serenades). Despite being designated a polka, it is a prime example of a choro, as it was played by choro artists at the time. It was originally written for piano, even though it has been adapted and arranged many times over the years by various arrangers. As many other compositions by Nazareth, it follows the A–B–A–C–A structure. It is in the key of G major, the B section is in E minor and the C section, or the trio, is in C major.

Nazareth built the piece in a way so the left hand resembles a cavaquinho, a type of guitar, and the right hand resembles a flute. The original score bears no tempo marking, but Nazareth specified that it should be played "com graça" (gracefully). It is in 2/4 and it used sixteenth notes profusely. Dynamically, it is rather flat, as everything is meant to be played f (or mf in some passages).

Despite the piece not bearing a tempo marking, Nazareth complained often that people played it too fast.

I met Nazareth around 1917. It was at the Eduardo Souto music store. Ernesto Nazareth had been hired to play piano pieces that customers wanted to buy. ... And he played everything slowly, always trying to sing through the music. ... In fact, he used to say, "All my music gets mangled. They play it so fast. 'Apanhei-te, Cavaquinho' is a disaster. It's meant to be played slowly, arpeggiating the left hand, to give the impression of a cavaquinho." He played everything slowly and very clearly, with a refined technique.

— Francisco Mignone, Ernesto Nazareth, Rei do Choro

== Reception ==
The piece became very successful right away and maintained its popularity over the following decades. It has been recorded more than 200 times by many different artists and it has inspired five different lyrics: the first one by Darci de Oliveira and Benito Lacerda, the second one by Baldomán, the third one by Nara Leão, the fourth one by Paulinho Garcia, and the fifth version was in French by Jacques Plante. Nazareth himself recorded it in 1930. French composer Darius Milhaud quoted it in his Le boeuf sur le toit.

"Apanhei-te, cavaquinho" was also rearranged and featured in Walt Disney's Melody Time, an anthology musical movie released in 1948. Ethel Smith and The Dinning Sisters were in charge of the 10-minute musical segment, with lyrics by Ray Gilbert.
