= Plangente =

1925 tango by Ernesto Nazareth

- by Ernesto Nazareth
- Key: G♯ minor
- Genre: Brazilian tango with habanera style
- Composed: 1925: Rio de Janeiro, Brazil
- Published: 1925: Rio de Janeiro, Brazil
- Scoring: Solo piano
- Dedicated to Francisco Dubois Bastos

"Plangente" (Portuguese for 'sorrowful') is a Brazilian tango for piano by Brazilian composer Ernesto Nazareth.

== Background ==
Nazareth, who spent all his life in Rio de Janeiro, wrote this piece when he was already a well-known composer and pianist. After he stopped working for Rio's Odeon Cinema, he began performing for a new publisher, Casa Carlos Gomes, as a "pianist demonstrator", a job he held from the early 20s to the early 30s, when he sunk into a recurrent depression that made him spend his last years in an asylum.

The date of composition of "Plangente" is uncertain. However, the best evidence points to the fact that it was written right before publication in 1925 by Casa Carlos Gomes, as Nazareth was a prolific composer and published very frequently. Nazareth, who was particularly fond of the piece, used it as part of his repertoire in his tour in São Paulo in 1926. A popular practice at the time, the piece was arranged for many different instruments and instrumental groups. The first recording of "Plangente" was an orchestration made by an unknown arranger and performed by Rio Artists Orchestra in March 1928.

It is dedicated to his "good and distinguished friend Francisco Dubois Bastos".

== Structure ==
"Plangente" is a Brazilian tango originally written for piano which has a total duration of around 5 to 6 minutes. Nazareth also indicates that it is written "in the style of a habanera", as some rhythmic and melodic patterns are more closely related to it than a normal tango. It follows the structure ABACA, which is typical of other compositions by Nazareth. The piece is in the key of G♯ minor, even though the contrasting central trio section is in A♭ major.

== Recordings ==
Aside from the premiere recording, which was arranged for orchestra and was performed by the Rio Artists Orchestra for the record label Odeon, "Plangente" has been recorded by many other musicians:

Recordings of Nazareth's "Plangente"
Piano	Date of recording	Date of release	Record label	Reference
Joshua Rifkin	August 1990	1991	Decca Records	
Iara Behs	November 2003	2005	Naxos Records	
