= Horácio de Matos =

Brazilian politician and colonel (1882–1931)

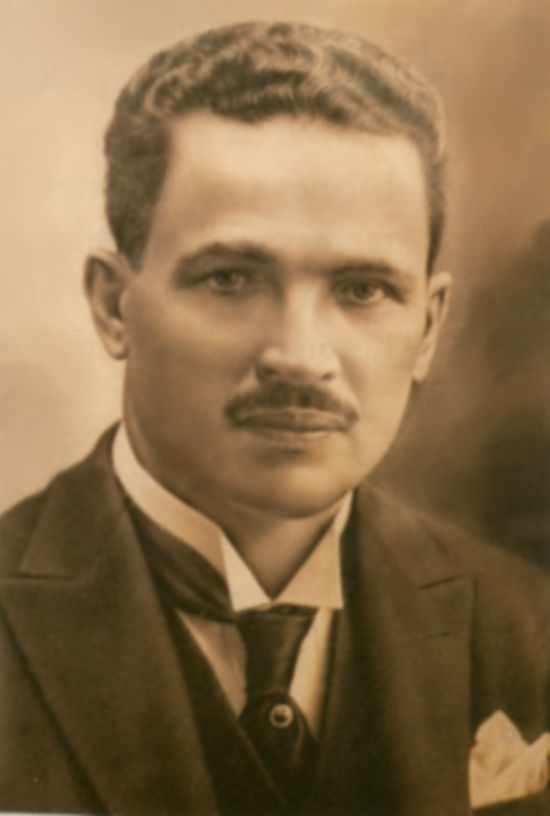

Personal details
- Born: 18 March 1882 Brotas de Macaúbas, Bahia, Brazil
- Died: 15 May 1931 (aged 49) Salvador, Bahia, Brazil

Horácio de Matos (March 18, 1882 – May 15, 1931) was a Brazilian politician and colonel.
