= Harry Prime =

- Born: Harry Charles Prime; March 5, 1920; Philadelphia, Pennsylvania
- Died: June 15, 2017 (aged 97) Chalfont, Pennsylvania
- Genres: Big band
- Occupation: Vocalist
- Years active: 1940s – mid-1950s

Harry Charles Prime (March 5, 1920 – June 15, 2017) was a Big Band vocalist who performed from the late 1940s through the mid-1950s.

Prime was a featured vocalist with the orchestras of Randy Brooks, Tommy Dorsey, Jack Fina and Ralph Flanagan. He died in Chalfont, Pennsylvania in 2017 at the age of 97.

== Music career ==
Prime recorded nearly 100 songs in the 1940s and 1950s, including "Until," a million-seller with the Tommy Dorsey Orchestra. "Until" peaked at number four in the US chart.
