= Jack Fina =

American bandleader, songwriter and pianist (1913–1970)

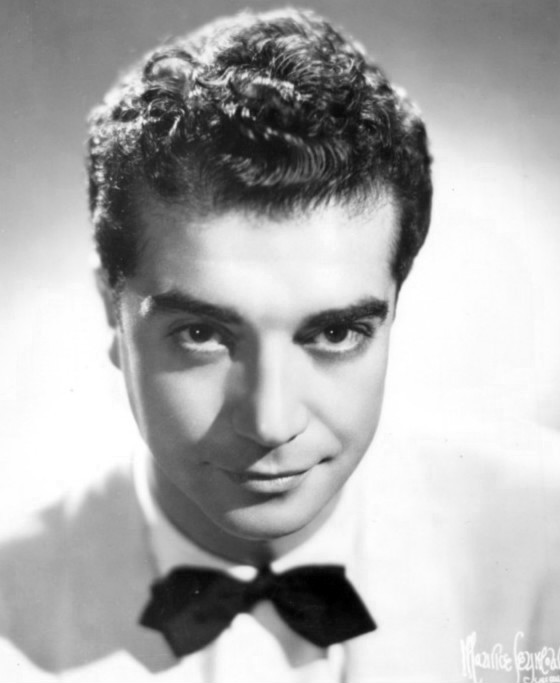
- Fina in 1948.

Background information
- Born: August 13, 1913; Passaic, New Jersey
- Died: May 14, 1970 (aged 56); Sherman Oaks, California

Jack Fina (August 13, 1913 – May 14, 1970) was a bandleader, songwriter, and pianist.

Fina was born in Passaic, New Jersey, and educated at the New York College of Music and was a student of August Fraemcke and Elsa Nicilini. He started out playing piano in Clyde McCoy's band sometime in the 1930s, but it wasn't until he joined Freddy Martin’s band in 1936 that he gained real fame, when he was featured on Martin’s famous recording of "Tonight We Love".

In 1946, Jack Fina formed his own 16-piece band, with Freddy Martin's blessing and financial backing. His first appearance was at the Claremont Hotel. The vocals were handled by Harry Prime and Gil Lewis. With good air time and good recordings, Fina became a national figure. Following up on the success of "Tonight We Love," Fina again turned to the classics and composed a boogie-woogie variation on Rimsky-Korsakov's "Flight of the Bumblebee." Fina's version, "Bumble Boogie", became a huge hit; Fina performed it as a solo piano specialty in the 1946 Columbia Pictures musical It's Great to Be Young.

Fina appeared at some of the top venues in the country, including the Waldorf-Astoria, the Aragon Ballroom, and the famous illegal gambling casino/night club in Galveston, the Balinese Room. He also appeared in several films, including Melody Time (Bumble Boogie sequence, 1948) and Disc Jockey (1951). A noted songwriter, his credits included Dream Sonata (his theme song), Chango and Piano Portraits.

In the 1950s, he reduced the size of his band and settled in San Francisco. He also operated a talent agency called the Concerto Music & Entertainment Agency with his manager Al King. In the early 1960s he appeared as a single on Dick Sinclair’s television show. In 1962 Fina joined the staff of the Beverly Hills Hotel in Sherman Oaks, California, where he led a small band for eight successful years. The engagement was curtailed by his death at age 56, from a heart attack. He is buried at Forest Lawn Cemetery, Hollywood Hills.
