= Clara Ricciolini =

Brazilian ballet dancer and stage actress

Clara Ricciolini (1822-1869), was a Brazilian ballet dancer and stage actress. She played a pioneer role in the introduction of ballet in South America, and has been referred to as the only ballerina in Brazil during the mid-19th century, when she was the a star attraction of the stage.

She was the daughter of opera singers Gaetano Ricciolini and Isabel Rubio Ricciolini. She made her debut in the theater of João Caetano in 1837. She was an appreciated actress, but was however to be more famous as a ballet dancer.
