= Nove de julho =

1917 Argentine tango by Ernesto Nazareth

- Argentine tango by Ernesto Nazareth
- English: Ninth of July
- Key: E major
- Form: Argentine tango
- Occasion: Centenary of the Argentine Declaration of Independence
- Composed: 1917, Rio de Janeiro
- Published: 1917, Rio de Janeiro
- Duration: c. 5 minutes
- Scoring: Piano

"Nove de julho" (Portuguese: Ninth of July) is an Argentine tango by Brazilian composer Ernesto Nazareth. It was the only Argentine tango composed by Nazareth, who was otherwise known for his dedication to Brazilian tango and choros.

== Background ==
Nazareth composed "Nove de julho" to commemorate the day the United Provinces of South America (later the Argentine Republic) declared their independence. Published in 1917, the piece was presumably written to mark the centenary of the Argentine declaration of independence. Like many of Nazareth's works, it was published shortly after completion by A. Napoleão & Co. It was dedicated "to my friend and great artist Gaspar de Magalhães". Nazareth never returned to the Argentine tango style.

== Structure ==
"Nove de julho" is an Argentine tango with a consistent underlying rhythm of a habanera. It follows a typical A–B–A–C–A structure, with the C section serving as the trio. The piece is in E major, although the B section shifts to the relative minor, C♯ minor, and the trio modulates to A major. There is no overall tempo marking, but each section begins with a distinct expression marking: "con alma" (soulfully), "delicatíssimo" (very delicate), and "bem jocoso" (very playful). The entire tango is intended to be played p, except for the trio, which ranges from f to ff.

== Recordings ==
Up to 2012, the piece has been recorded 13 times by different musicians. Here is an incomplete list of recordings:

Recordings of Nazareth's "Nove de julho"
Piano	Date of recording	Date of release	Record label	References
Joshua Rifkin	August 1990	1991	Decca Records	
