= The Shared Space =

1979 book by Milton Santos

The Shared Space: The Two Circuits Of The Urban Economy In Underdeveloped Countries is a book published by Brazilian geographer Milton Santos in 1979. It is part of Santos' efforts to "create an original theoretical framework for understanding cities" in the "underdeveloped" world and introduces his political economy concept of circuit theory.

== Contents ==
The book is subdivided in four parts. The first part argues that contemporary urban theories were "inadequate" for underdeveloped nations. He then advocates for a new paradigm based on two "circuits" of the colonial urban economy. The second part describes the upper circuit as "using imported capital-intensive technology and consisting of banking, export trade and industry, modern urban industry, trade and services, wholesaling" and more. The third part covers the "lower" circuit, relating it to Third World poverty and "small-scale, non-capital-intensive" activity. The final part discusses monopoly, the state, macro-spatial organization, and introduces the concept of the shared space. Santos concludes with the following:

"The two circuits of the urban economy constitute a crucial aspect of the many problems presently faced by underdeveloped countries. Their existence bears witness to the failure of past and present development planning theory, at least in capitalist underdeveloped countries" (page 203).

To develop his original concept of circuit theory, Santos discusses urban peripheries (ghettos and shanty towns), the "mediating role" of banks, migration, industrialization, monopolies, and the informal economy, among others. The arguments expressed in this book share similarities with perspectives developed in Marxist geography, a strand of critical geography.

The concept of circuit theory originally developed in this book was "partially cast aside" for Santos' later "foundational" book For a New Geography (1978).

== Publication history ==
An earlier version was published in French as L'espace partagé: les deux circuits de l'économie urbaine des pays sous-développés in 1975. During his forced exile by the Brazilian military dictatorship, Santos held positions at several French universities, including the University of Toulouse (1964-1967), the University of Bordeaux (1967-1968), and Université de Paris-Sorbonne (1968-1971).

Santos also published similar ideas in an article in Antipode in December 1977 titled "Spatial Dialectics: The Two Circuits of Urban Economy in Underdeveloped Countries."

The original French version was revised, translated, and adapted for publication in English in 1979. An eBook edition was published in 2017. In 2021, The Shared Space was digitized by the Internet Archive with funding from the Kahle/Austin Foundation.

== Critical reception ==
Reviewer Terrence McGee wrote in 1982 that "Santos’s book is to be commended as a pioneer investigation. It is an important milestone in the interpretation of the third world urbanization." A review in The Geographical Journal particularly praised the fact that Santos "lives and works in an underdeveloped country and thus provides an inside view on contemporary issues," and expressed appreciation that Santos presented an explanatory theory and was "not simply another empirical description." However, the reviewer expressed concern that not all of Santos's theories would apply equally well to "diverse parts of the Third World", such as India.

== See also ==
- Milton Santos
- Critical geography
- Marxist geography
- Globalization
- Economic inequality
