= Gaetano Ricciolini =

Italian opera singer

Gaetano Ricciolini (27 August 1778, Florence – 9 October 1845, Rio de Janeiro) was an Italian bass-baritone and a choreographer who helped introduce opera and dance in South America.

Ricciolini started his operatic career in Florence in the late 18th century. He moved to Portugal in 1805 as a soloist of the São Carlos National Theater, in Lisbon. There he met his wife, the Spanish-Portuguese soprano Isabel Rubio Ricciolini.

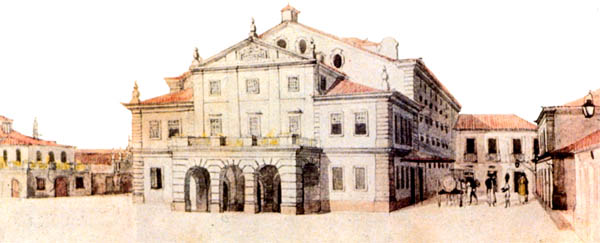
São João Royal Theater, Rio de Janeiro (circa 1820)

Gaetano and Isabel Ricciolini settled in Rio de Janeiro in 1817 as members of the Italian opera company of the São João Royal Theater, where they performed the Brazilian premières of Wolfgang Amadeus Mozart's “Don Giovanni” and Gioacchino Rossini's "Il Barbiere di Siviglia”.

After a fire destroyed the São João Theatre in 1824, Ricciolini moved to Buenos Aires and introduced opera and ballet in Argentina. Back to Brazil in 1830, Ricciolini died as a music and dance teacher in Rio de Janeiro.
