= Isabel Rubio Ricciolini =

Portuguese singer and actress

Isabel Rubio Ricciolini (1792-1846), was a Brazilian operatic soprano and stage actress. She is credited with a pioneer role in introducing opera to South America.

Rubio was born in Lisbon as the daughter of the Spanish Juan Antonio Rubio and Juana Rodriguez. She married the Italian opera singer Gaetano Ricciolini, and became the mother of the star actress Clara Ricciolini. In 1817, the family emigrated to Brazil, where they were engaged at the Real Teatro de São João in Rio de Janeiro. In 1823, she was a co-founder of the "Acadêmicos Filarmônicos", the first association which performed regular public concerts in Brazil. Between 1824 and 1829, she and her spouse where active in Buenos Aires. From 1837 until her death, she was engaged in the theater of João Caetano.

Her daughter, the star dancer and actress Clara Ricciolini, was one of the star attractions of the Brazilian stage between the 1840s and 1860s.
