= Wilfredo Santa-Gómez =

Puerto Rican writer

Wilfredo Santa-Gómez (also known as Wilfredo G. Santa, born 1949) is a Puerto Rican author who has published numerous books in Spanish on self-help, short stories, and poetry.

== Biography ==
Santa-Gómez was born in the city of Caguas, Puerto Rico in 1949. He has resided in Zaragoza, Spain, where he belonged to the Hispanic Writers Association, and also in New Jersey and Boston, United States, where he graduated from the Harvard Medical School's Department of Psychiatry. He now resides in Gurabo, Puerto Rico and still works actively in the prevention of many social problems of his country.

== Contributions ==
In his book The Great Window (1994) he proposed the theory of the "Protective Unconscious." The writer and media personality has written many books and articles relating to psychiatry. For sixteen years he hosted a radio talk show, Ya No Estás Solo (Never alone again), which is an educational program in the area of mental health. Because his work has reached international proportions he has been recognized and awarded by many civic organizations of Puerto Rico. He has also published scientific articles in international psychiatric journals. He has also written more than 300 educational press articles in Spanish for international digital and traditional magazines and newspapers. All his work has been on a non-profit basis.

== Publications ==
=== Literary works ===
- Platón Arapos Patriota – 1972 (short story)
- A orillas del río Ebro – 1974 (poetry)
- The Experiment – 1974 (science fiction novel) ISBN 84-400-9202-4
- Sueños del Yukayeke (poetry) – 1974
- Por Un Camino de Estrellas (poetry) – 1976

=== Self-help and nonfiction publications ===
- La Salud Vista A Través de los Refranes – 1978
- La Gran Ventana – 1994 (The Great Window) (under name Wilfredo G. Santa)
- Por Qué Me Dejaste de Amar-Si Soy Del Planeta Tierra – 1996 (Why Did You Stop Loving Me, if I am from Planet Earth) (under name Wilfredo G. Santa) ISBN 0-9763749-1-9
- The Protective Unconscious – 1996 ISBN 0-9763749-3-5
- Las ocho fuerzas universales que controlan tu existencia – 1998 ISBN 0-9763749-4-3

He also writes for international digital, and traditional newspapers.

== See also ==
- List of Puerto Ricans
