= Diltor Opromolla =

Diltor Vladimir Araújo Opromolla (13 April 1934, São Paulo – 15 December 2004, Bauru) was a Brazilian physician and dermatologist respected due to his lifetime work with leprosy patients and leprosy research. Opromolla performed all his work at Lauro de Souza Lima Institute in Bauru, São Paulo, a WHO reference hospital for dermatology. He taught dermatology and leprosy to doctors, nurses, and other health workers. Among other things, he was the first to introduce rifamycin in the treatment of leprosy, in 1963.

Opromolla battled gastric cancer for the whole year of 2004 and died on December 15, 2004.
