= Silvano Raia =

Brazilian surgeon (1930–2026)

Silvano Mario Attilio Raia (1 September 1930 – 28 April 2026) was a Brazilian surgeon who specialized in liver diseases. He was a professor emeritus at the Faculty of Medicine of the University of São Paulo (FMUSP).

Raia was the first doctor to achieve a successful living donor liver transplantation in July 1989.

Raia died on 28 April 2026, at the age of 95.
