= Sérgio Pereira da Silva Porto =

Brazilian physicist (1926–1979)

- Esfahan Symposium on Laser, professor Sérgio Pereira Porto
- Born: 19 January 1926; Niterói -- RJ
- Died: 21 June 1979 (aged 53)
- Known for: Pioneering work in Raman spectroscopy using lasers
- Scientific career
- Fields: Physics
- Workplaces: Hopkins University (Baltimore), Instituto Tecnológico de Aeronáutica (ITA), Bell Laboratories, University of Southern California, Institute of Physics "Gleb Wataghin",...

Sérgio Pereira da Silva Porto (19 January 1926 – 21 June 1979) was a Brazilian physicist.

== Bibliography ==
- Influence of Optical Activity on Raman spectre
- Experimental observation of Polaritons in Ionic Crystals
- Study of Oblique Phonons in Birefringent Crystals
- Light Scattering by Spin Waves (Magnons)
- Raman Scattering by F-Centers
- Enhancement of Raman Cross-sections due to Resonant Absorption
- Observation of Anti-symmetric Electronic Raman Scattering
- Raman Scattering from Metallic Surfaces
- Depolarization Ratio and Raman Cross-section of Gases
- Symmetry forbidden First-order Raman Spectra in Disordered Solids
- Laser Isotope Separation
- Generalization of Lyddane-Sachs-Teller relation for Ordered-Disordered Crystals
- Absence of Soft-mode in Ordered-Disordered Ferroelectrics.
