= Brotas de Macaúbas =

Municipality of Bahia, Brazil

Coordinates: 12°00′S 42°38′W

- Municipality
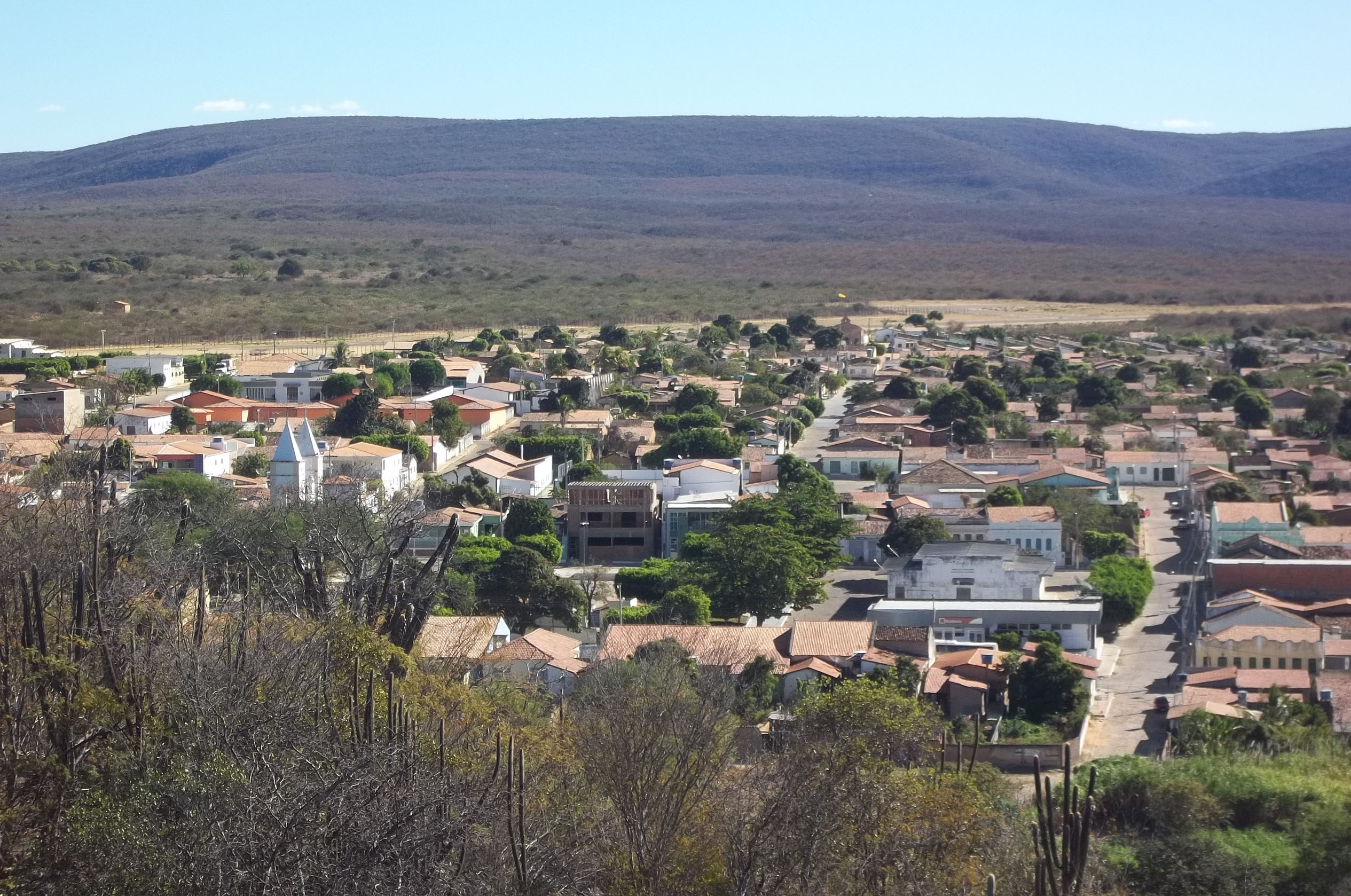

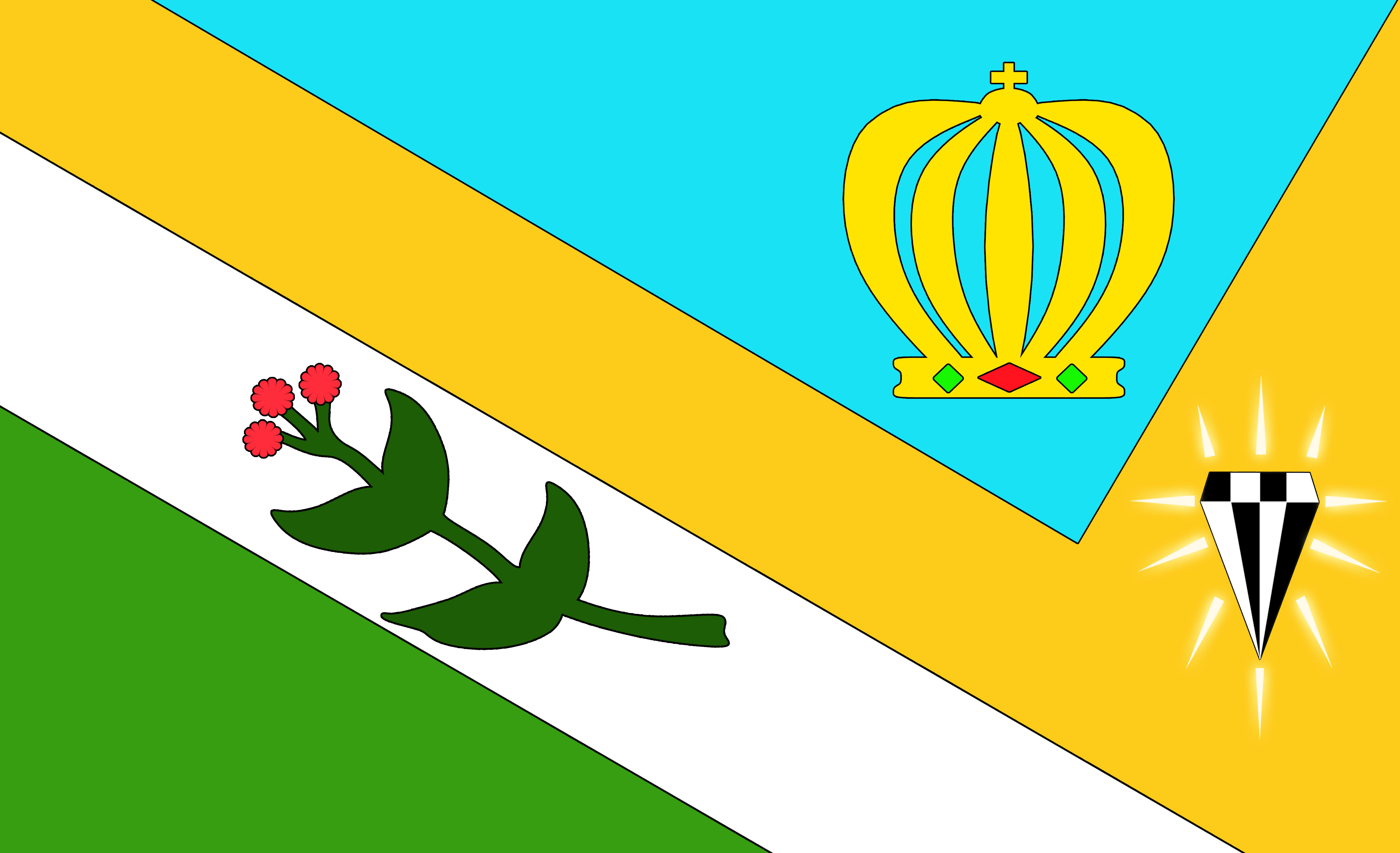
- Flag Coat of arms
- Interactive map of Brotas de Macaúbas
- Country: Brazil
- Region: Nordeste
- State: Bahia

Population (2020)
  - Total: 10,130
- Time zone: UTC−3 (BRT)

Brotas de Macaúbas is a municipality in the state of Bahia in the North-East region of Brazil.

== Notable people ==
- Horácio de Matos (1882–1931), politician and colonel

== See also ==
- List of municipalities in Bahia
