= Ernesto Nazareth =

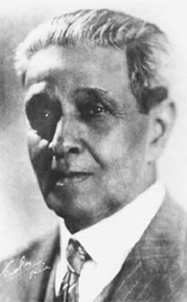

Background information
- Born: March 20, 1863; Rio de Janeiro, Brazil
- Died: February 1, 1934 (aged 70)
- Genres: Classical
- Occupation: Composer
- Instrument: Piano

Ernesto Júlio de Nazareth (March 20, 1863 – February 1, 1934) was a Brazilian composer and pianist, especially noted for his creative maxixe and choro compositions. Influenced by a diverse set of dance rhythms including the polka, the habanera and the lundu, he combined these elements with his classical training to create compositions that he called “Brazilian tangos". These would be the precursors for what is known today as Choro. His piano repertoire is now part of the teaching programs of both classical and popular styles, as Nazareth once served at the boundary between these two worlds.

== Biography ==
Nazareth was born in Rio de Janeiro, one of five children. His mother, Carolina da Cunha, gave him his first piano lessons. At the age of ten, after his mother's death, he continued his piano studies with Eduardo Madeira and Charles Lucien Lambert.

Strongly influenced by Chopin, Nazareth published his first composition Você Bem Sabe (which means "You know it well") in 1877, at age 14. At that time, he had begun his professional career playing in cafes, balls, society parties and in the waiting rooms of theaters. In 1893, Casa Vieira Machado published his famous tango Brejeiro.

In 1879, he wrote his first tango, Cruz perigo. In 1880, at age 17, he made his first public appearance at the Mozart Club. The following year, he composed the tango Não caio n'outra, his first great success, with several reprints. In 1885, he performed in concerts in different clubs of the court. In 1893, Casa Vieira Machado launched a new catalogue of his compositions, including the tango Brejeiro, which achieved national and even international success; the Republican Guard band of Paris included it in their repertoire and recorded it.

His first concert as a pianist took place in 1898. The following year he prepared the first edition of the tango Turuna. In 1905, he had his first work, Brejeiro, recorded by singer Mario Pinheiro with the title O sertanejo enamorado with lyrics by Catulo da Paixão Cearense. Meanwhile, the "Casa Édison" marching band recorded his tango Brushed, which became quite successful. In 1907 Nazareth was appointed third book-keeper of the National Treasury, a position that he did not occupy for not mastering the English language. In 1908, he began working as a pianist at the Mozart Club.

The following year, he participated in a concert held at the National Institute of Music, playing his gavotte Corbeille de fleurs and tango Batuque. He began giving private piano lessons, and worked as a pianist for Casa Gomes in 1921, and the Odeon Cinema from 1920 until 1924. In São Paulo and Campinas he performed several shows in the Municipal Theater and the Conservatory. He was given a grand piano as a gift from his admirers. He was one of the first artists to play for the Society Radio of Rio de Janeiro. In 1932 he presented, for the first time, a recital in which he performed only his compositions.

In 1933, after a period of mental instability following the deaths of his wife and daughter, and diagnosed with syphilis and worsening hearing problems caused by a fall during childhood, Nazareth was hospitalized at the Juliano Moreira Asylum in Jacarepaguá. He fled the asylum February 1, 1934 and was found dead three days later in the adjacent forest near a waterfall, where he had drowned.

== Catalog of works ==
Brejeiro (Ernesto Nazareth) - score available at Musica Brasilis website

Nazareth was noted for creatively combining diverse influences into his music, not only of Brazilian music but also from the music of Europe, Africa and ragtime. Many of his compositions remain part of the repertory today. He composed 88 tangos, 41 waltzes, 28 polkas and numerous sambas, galops, quadrilles, Schottisches, fox-trots, romances and other types of scores, totaling 211 complete compositions.

- 1922
- A bella Melusina
- A flor de meus sonhos
- A florista
- A fonte do lambari
- A fonte do suspiro
- Adieu
- Adorável
- Ai rica prima
- Albíngia
- Alerta!
- Ameno resedá
- Andante expressivo
- Apanhei-te, cavaquinho
- Arreliado
- Arrojado
- Arrufos
- As gracinhas de Nhô-nhô
- Até que enfim!
- Atlântico
- Atrevidinha
- Atrevido
- Bambino
- Bambino – você não me dá! – words by Catulo da Paixão Cearense
- Batuque
- Beija-Flor
- Beijinho de moça
- Bom-Bom
- Brejeira
- Brejeiro
- Bicyclette-club
- Caçadora
- Cacique
- Capricho
- Cardosina
- Carioca
- Catrapuz
- Cavaquinho, por que choras?
- Celestial
- Chave de ouro
- Chile-Brazil
- Comigo é na madeira
- Confidências
- Coração que sente
- Corbeille de Fleurs
- Correcta
- Crê e espera
- Crises em penca
- Cruz, perigo!!
- Cruzeiro
- Cubanos
- Cuéra
- Cutuba
- Cuyubinha
- De tarde
- Delightfulness
- Dengoso
- Desengonçado
- Digo
- Dirce
- Divina
- Dor secreta
- Dora
- Duvidoso
- Elegantíssima
- Elegia para piano (left hand)
- Elétrica
- Elite-club
- Encantada
- Encantador
- Ensimesmado
- Eponina
- Escorregando
- Escovado
- Espalhafatoso
- Espanholita
- Está chumbado
- Eulina
- Expansiva
- Êxtase (voice, piano and violin)
- Êxtase (piano)
- Exuberante
- Faceira
- Famoso
- Fantástica
- Favorito
- Feitiço
- Ferramenta
- Fetiço não mata
- Fidalga
- Floraux
- Fon-fon
- Fora dos eixos
- Furinga
- Garoto
- Gaúcho
- Gemendo, rindo e pulando
- Genial
- Gente, o imposto pegou?
- Gentil
- Gotas de ouro
- Gracietta
- Guerreiro
- Helena
- Henriette
- Hino a Alaor Prata
- Hino a Carneiro Leão
- Hino a Pereira Passos
- Hino da Escola Ester Pedreira de Mello
- Hino da Escola Floriano Peixoto
- Hino da Escola Pedro II
- Ideal
- If I Am Not Mistaken
- Improviso (Concert Study)
- Insuperável
- Ipanema
- Iris
- Jacaré
- Jangadeiro
- Janota
- Julieta ('quadrilha', popular Brazilian dance)
- Julieta (valse)
- Julita
- Labirinto
- Laço Azul
- Lamentos
- Magnífico
- Mágoas
- Maly
- Mandinga
- Marcha Fúnebre
- Marcha Heróica aos Dezoito do Forte
- Mariazinha sentada na pedra
- Marietta
- Matuto
- Meigo
- Menino de ouro
- Mercedes
- Mesquitinha
- Myosótis
- Não caio n'outra!
- Não me fujas assim
- Nazareth
- Nenê
- Nenê – words by Catulo da Paixão Cearense
- No jardim
- Noêmia
- Noturno
- Nove de julho
- Nove de Maio
- O Alvorecer
- O Futurista
- O nome dela (polca)
- O Nome dela (valse)
- O que há
- Os teus olhos cativam
- Odeon
- Onze de Maio
- Orminda
- Ouro sobre azul
- Pairando
- Paraíso
- Pássaros em festa
- Paulicéa como és formosa!
- Perigoso
- Pierrot
- Pingüim
- Pipoca
- Pirilampo
- Plangente
- Plus Ultra
- Podia ser pior
- Polca para a mão esquerda (left hand)
- Polonaise
- Por que sofre?
- Primorosa
- Proeminente
- Quebra-Cabeças
- Quebradinha
- Ramirinho
- Ranzinza
- Rayon d'Or
- Reboliço
- Recordações do passado
- Remando
- Resignação
- Respingando
- Ressaca
- Retumbante
- Rosa Maria
- Sagaz
- Salve, Salve, Nações Unidas
- Sarambeque
- Saudade
- Saudade dos Pagos
- Saudades e Saudades!
- Segredo
- Segredos da infância
- Sentimentos d'Alma
- Soberano
- Suculento
- Sustenta a ...nota...
- Sutil
- Tango Habenera
- Talismã
- Tenebroso
- Thierry
- Topázio líquido
- Travesso
- Tudo Sobe...
- Tupinambá
- Turbilhão de beijos
- Turuna
- Vem cá, Branquinha
- Vésper
- Victória
- Vitorioso
- Você bem sabe
- Xangô
- Yolanda
- Zênite (authored by Maestro Gaó)
- Zica
- Zizinha

== Media ==
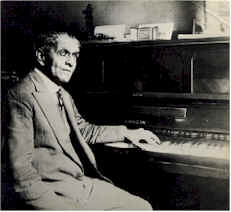
Ernesto Nazareth

Escovado
Composed (1905) and recorded (1930) by Ernesto Nazareth

'Escovado' is a common slang which means 'smart'. Ary Vasconcelos tells us in his book Panorama da Musica Popular Brasileira that Nazareth was a "devoted family man who often gave the songs he composed titles in honor of his son, sometimes his wife, or another relative". Travesso was dedicated to his son Ernesto, Marieta and Eulina to his two daughters, Dora to his wife Theodora, Brejeiro to his nephew Gilbert, etc.

Escovado was first published by Casa Vieira Machado & Co. and dedicated to Fernando Nazareth, the composer's younger brother. It became one of Nazareth's greatest success, having the main theme been later tapped by the French composer Darius Milhaud in his Le bœuf sur le toit (1919). In September 1930, accepting an invitation made by Eduardo Souto, then artistic director of Odeon-Parlophone, Nazareth recorded this piece.

Brejeiro is one of the ambient songs in the game Civilization VI, when playing with Brazil. The version used in the game was composed and directed by Geoff Knorr.
