= Rosa Antonelli =

Argentine pianist

- Born: Buenos Aires, Argentina
- Genres: Jazz, Latin jazz, Classical
- Occupations: Musician, Concert Pianist
- Instruments: Piano, keyboards
- Years active: 1976–present
- Labels: Albany Records
- Website: rosaantonelli.com

Rosa Antonelli (born Buenos Aires, Argentina) is an Argentine pianist, she was appointed Steinway Artist by Steinway & Sons since 1998 and currently based in New York.

== Biography ==
=== Background ===
Rosa Antonelli was born in Buenos Aires, Argentina. Antonelli’s paternal and maternal ancestors along with her grandparents hailed from Italy living near the Molise region of Southern Italy. After World War II, her grandparents migrated to Argentina. She began playing the piano at the age of 3, and at the age of 4, she studied under private teachers who were disciples of Vincenzo Scaramuzza. She later obtained her degree as the Superior Professor of Piano and Theory, with honors, at the age of 13. At the age of 14, Antonelli entered the National Conservatory of Music Carlos Lopez Buchardo.

=== Career ===
In 2009, Antonelli released her first album, an album called Esperanza: Sounds of Hope, consisting of 21 songs by composers such as Astor Piazzolla and Heitor Villa-Lobos. In 2012, she released her second album Remembranza: Remembrance of Latin Sounds by Albany Records. In 2015, She released her third album Abrazando: Latin Embrace, by Albany Records consisting of a collection of 16 tracks by Spanish, Argentinian and Mexican musicians such as Isaac Albéniz, Piazzolla and Manuel Ponce. In 2020, she released her last album, Bridges, which represented five generations of music starting with Chopin from the 19th century and ending with Piazzolla of the 20th century.

=== Tours ===
Antonelli performed in several places and in several countries including Carnegie Hall, Lincoln Center, Ateneo de Madrid, Cairo Opera House, Glinka Museum, Casa de España, Colon Theatre and Palacio de Bellas Artes. In 1987, Antonelli performed in 20 countries in Europe, Asia, and Africa, the tour was sponsored by Argentina’s Office of the President and Ministry of Culture in association with several countries' Ministry of Foreign Affairs such as Italy, Germany, Egypt, Chile, Colombia and Brazil.

== Discography ==
- Esperanza: Sounds of Hope — 2009
- Remembranza: Remembrance of Latin Sounds — 2012
- Abrazando: Latin Embrace — 2015
- Bridges — 2019

== Awards and honors ==
- Honorary Member of the Chapter Espsilon On Capa.
- La Sociedad Nacional Honoraria Hispanica.
- Gabriela Mistral Julia de Burgos Frida Kahlo award (2018).
- Rosa Antonelli day (April 23, 2014).
