= List of compositions by Dmitri Shostakovich =

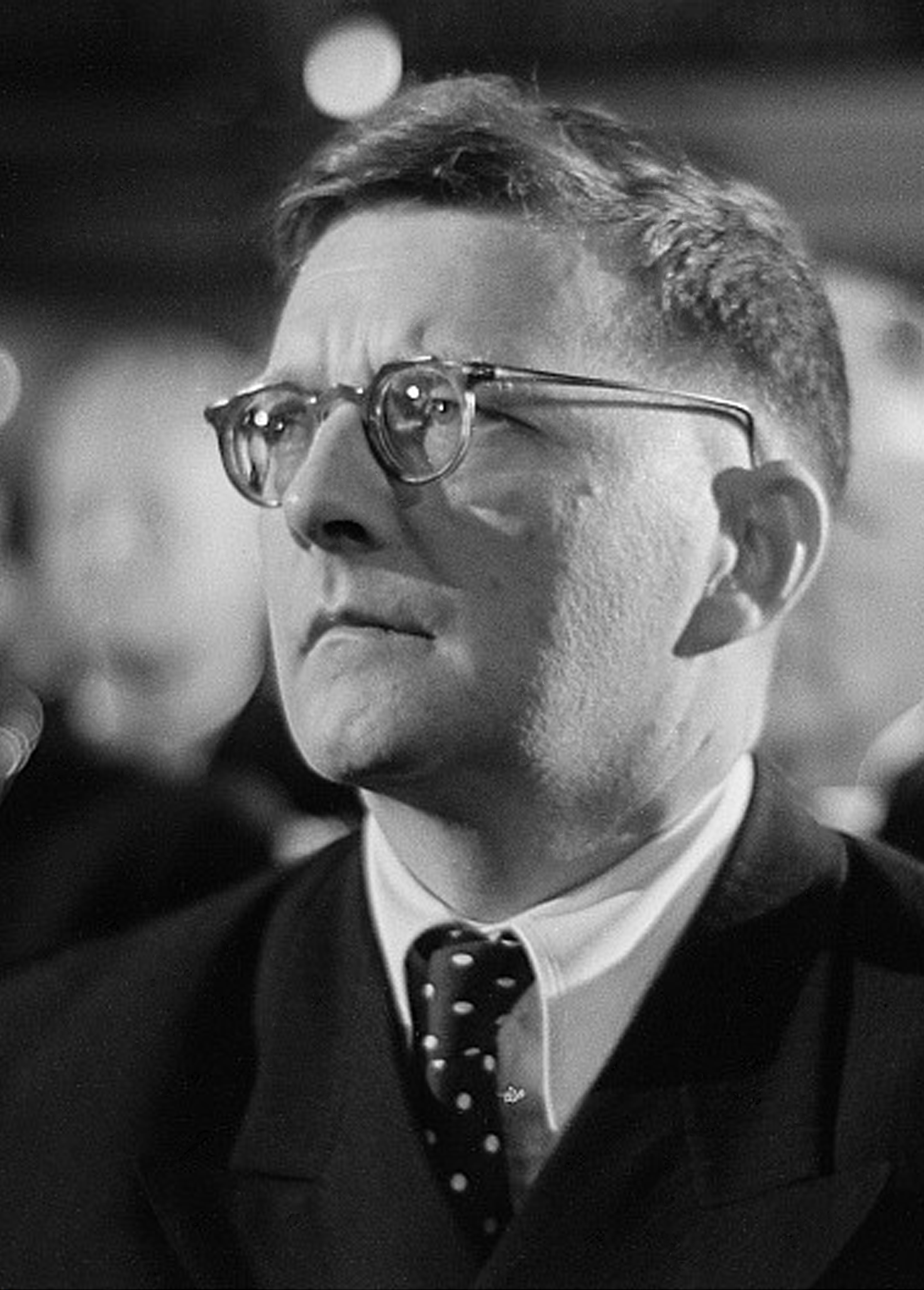
Dmitri Shostakovich in 1950

Dmitri Shostakovich typically catalogued his compositions and occasionally his arrangements of other composers' music with opus numbers. He began this practice with the early Scherzo in F-sharp minor and continued until the end of his life. Nevertheless, most of his juvenilia, unfinished works from his artistic maturity (such as the operas Orango and The Gamblers), and numerous completed works were left unnumbered. There were also instances when Shostakovich took an opus number assigned to one work, then gave it to another, or was undecided about the numbering of a finished composition. Further complicating the matter was an error he committed in compiling his own music in the 1930s. This led to his soundtracks for The Youth of Maxim and Girl Friends sharing the same opus number.

== By genre ==
=== Symphonies ===
- Op. 10: Symphony No. 1 in F minor (1923–1925)
- Op. 14: Symphony No. 2 in B major, To October, for mixed chorus and orchestra (1927)
- Op. 20: Symphony No. 3 in E♭ major, The First of May, for mixed chorus and orchestra (1929)
- Op. 43: Symphony No. 4 in C minor (1935–1936)
- Op. 47: Symphony No. 5 in D minor (1937)
- Op. 54: Symphony No. 6 in B minor (1939)
- Op. 60: Symphony No. 7 in C major (1941)
- Op. 65: Symphony No. 8 in C minor (1943)
- Op. 70: Symphony No. 9 in E♭ major (1945)
- Op. 93: Symphony No. 10 in E minor (1953)
- Op. 103: Symphony No. 11 in G minor, The Year 1905 (1957)
- Op. 112: Symphony No. 12 in D minor, The Year 1917 (1961)
- Op. 113: Symphony No. 13 in B♭ minor, for bass, bass chorus, and orchestra (1962)
- Op. 135: Symphony No. 14, for soprano, bass, string orchestra, and percussion (1969)
- Op. 141: Symphony No. 15 in A major (1971)

=== Concertos ===
- Op. 35: Piano Concerto No. 1 in C minor (1933); also known as the Concerto in C minor for Piano, Trumpet, and String Orchestra
- Op. 77: Violin Concerto No. 1 in A minor (1947–1948)
- Op. 102: Piano Concerto No. 2 in F major (1957)
- Op. 107: Cello Concerto No. 1 in E♭ major (1959)
- Op. 126: Cello Concerto No. 2 in G major (1966)
- Op. 129: Violin Concerto No. 2 in C♯ minor (1967)

=== Suites ===
- Op. 15a: Suite from The Nose, for tenor, baritone, and orchestra (1927–1928)
- Op. 22a: Suite from The Age of Gold, for orchestra (1929–1930)
- Op. 27a: Suite from The Bolt, for orchestra (1931)
- Op. 30a: Suite from Golden Mountains, for orchestra (1931)
- Op. 32a: Suite from Hamlet, for small orchestra (1932)
- Op. 36a: Suite from The Tale of the Priest and of His Workman Balda (1935)
- Op. 38a: Suite for Jazz Orchestra No. 1 (1934)
- Op. 39a: Suite from The Limpid Stream, for orchestra (1934–1935)
- Op. 50a: Suite from The Maxim Trilogy for chorus and orchestra (1938)
- Op. 50b: Suite for Jazz Orchestra No. 2 (3 movements) (1938)
- Op. 64a: Suite from Zoya, for chorus and orchestra (1944, arranged by Levon Atovmyan)
- Op. 75a: Suite from The Young Guard (1951, arranged by Levon Atovmyan)
- Op. 76a: Suite from Pirogov, for orchestra (1947, arranged by Levon Atovmyan)
- Op. 78a: Suite from Michurin, for chorus and orchestra (1964, arranged by Levon Atovmyan)
- Op. 80a: Suite from Meeting on the Elbe, for voices and orchestra (1948)
- Op. 82a: Suite from The Fall of Berlin, for chorus and orchestra (1949, arranged by Levon Atovmyan)
- Ballet Suite No. 1, for orchestra (1949, arranged by Levon Atovmyan)
- Ballet Suite No. 2, for orchestra (1951, arranged by Levon Atovmyan)
- Ballet Suite No. 3, for orchestra (1953, arranged by Levon Atovmyan)
- Ballet Suite No. 4, for orchestra (1953, arranged by Levon Atovmyan)
- Op. 85a: Suite from Belinsky, for chorus and orchestra (1960, arranged by Levon Atovmyan)
- Op. 89a: Suite from The Unforgettable Year 1919, for orchestra (1953, arranged by Levon Atovmyan)
- Op. 97a: Suite from The Gadfly, for orchestra (1955, arranged by Levon Atovmyan)
- Op. 99a: Suite from The First Echelon, for chorus and orchestra (1956)
- Suite for Variety Orchestra (8 movements) (post-1956)
- Op. 111a: Suite from Five Days, Five Nights, for orchestra (1961)
- Op. 114a: Suite of Five Fragments from the opera Katarina Izmailova, for orchestra (1963)
- Op. 116a: Suite from Hamlet, for orchestra (1964, arranged by Levon Atovmyan)
- Op. 120a: Suite from A Year Is Like a Lifetime, for orchestra (1965)

=== Miscellaneous symphonic works ===
- Op. 1: Scherzo in F♯ minor, for orchestra (1919)
- Op. 3: Theme and Variations in B♭ major, for orchestra (1921–1922)
- Op. 7: Scherzo in E♭ major, for orchestra (1923–1924)
- Op. 23: Overture and Finale to Erwin Dressel's opera Armer Columbus, for orchestra (1929)
- The Green Company, overture for orchestra (1931)
- Op. 42: Five Fragments, for small orchestra (1935)
- Solemn March, for military band/wind orchestra (1942)
- Three Pieces, for orchestra (1947–1948)
- Op. 96: Festive Overture in A major, for orchestra (1954)
- Op. 111b: Novorossiisk Chimes, the Flame of Eternal Glory, for orchestra (1960)
- Op. 115: Overture on Russian and Kirghiz Folk Themes, for orchestra (1963)
- Op. 130: Funeral-Triumphal Prelude, for orchestra (1967)
- Op. 131: October, symphonic poem in C minor for orchestra (1967)
- Op. 139: "March of the Soviet Militia", for military band/wind orchestra (1970)
- "Intervision", for orchestra (1971)

=== String quartets ===
- Two Pieces for string quartet (1931) (arranged from Lady Macbeth of the Mtsensk District and from The Golden Age)
- Op. 49: String Quartet No. 1 in C major (1938)
- Op. 68: String Quartet No. 2 in A major (1944)
- Op. 73: String Quartet No. 3 in F major (1946)
- Op. 83: String Quartet No. 4 in D major (1949)
- Op. 92: String Quartet No. 5 in B♭ major (1952)
- Op. 101: String Quartet No. 6 in G major (1956)
- Op. 108: String Quartet No. 7 in F♯ minor (1960)
- Op. 110: String Quartet No. 8 in C minor (1960)
- Quartet Movement in E♭ major (surviving movement of an early version of the String Quartet No. 9; circa 1960)
- Op. 117: String Quartet No. 9 in E♭ major (1964)
- Op. 118: String Quartet No. 10 in A♭ major (1964)
- Op. 122: String Quartet No. 11 in F minor (1966)
- Op. 133: String Quartet No. 12 in D♭ major (1968)
- Op. 138: String Quartet No. 13 in B♭ minor (1970)
- Op. 142: String Quartet No. 14 in F♯ major (1972–1973)
- Op. 144: String Quartet No. 15 in E♭ minor (1974)
- String Quartet No. 16 in B major (unrealized)

=== Other chamber/instrumental works ===
- Op. 8: Piano Trio No. 1 in C minor (1923)
- Op. 9: Three Pieces, for cello and piano (1923–1924, lost; a fourth piece may have been destroyed by the composer)
- Op. 11: Two Pieces, for string octet (1924–1925)
- Impromptu, for viola and piano (1931)
- Op. 40: Cello Sonata in D minor (1934)
- Op. 40a: Moderato, for cello and piano (1934)
- Op. 57: Piano Quintet in G minor (1940)
- Op. 58i: Polka in F♯ minor, for two harps (1941)
- Op. 67: Piano Trio No. 2 in E minor (1944)
- Op. 134: Violin Sonata (1968)
- Op. 147: Viola Sonata (1975)

=== Piano ===
- Funeral March in Memory of the Victims of the Revolution (1918)
- Op. 2: Eight Preludes (1919–1920)
- Minuet, Prelude, and Intermezzo (1917 or 1919–1920)
- Op. 5: Three Fantastic Dances (1922)
- Op. 6: Suite in F♯ minor for two pianos (1922)
- Op. 12: Sonata No. 1 (1926)
- Op. 13: Aphorisms (1927)
- Op. 34: 24 Preludes (1932–1933)
- Four Fugues (1934)
- Op. 61: Sonata No. 2 in B minor (1943)
- Op. 69: Children's Notebook (1944–1945)
- Murzilka (1944–1945)
- Merry March for two pianos (1949)
- Op. 87: 24 Preludes and Fugues (1950–1951)
- Dances of the Dolls (1952)
- Op. 94: Concertino in A minor for two pianos (1953)
- Tarantella for two pianos (1954)
- Variations VIII, IX, and XI for the Eleven Variations on a Theme by Glinka (1957)

=== Operas ===
- The Gypsies, opera after Pushkin (1919–1920; partially destroyed)
- Op. 15: The Nose, satirical opera in three acts (and an epilogue) after Gogol (1927–1928); also a suite for orchestra (see Op. 15a)
- Op. 29: Lady Macbeth of the Mtsensk District, opera in four acts after Leskov (1930–1934); later revised as Katerina Ismailova (see Op. 114); also a suite for orchestra (see Op. 29a)
- The Big Lightning, comic opera (1932–1933; unfinished)
- Orango, satirical opera in three acts (and a prologue) (1932; unfinished)
- The Twelve Chairs, operetta (1939; unfinished sketches)
- Katyusha Maslova, opera after Tolstoy's novel Resurrection (1940–1941; unfinished sketches)
- The Gamblers, opera after Gogol (1941–1942; unfinished); completion in two acts by Krzysztof Meyer in 1978
- Op. 105: Moscow, Cheryomushki, operetta in three acts (1957–1958); also a film version (see Op. 105a)
- Op. 114: Katerina Ismailova, opera in four acts after Leskov (1956–1963); revision of Lady Macbeth of the Mtsensk District (see Op. 29); also a suite of five entr'actes (see Op. 114a) and a film version

=== Ballets ===
- Op. 22: The Golden Age, three acts (1929–1930)
- Op. 27: The Bolt, three acts (1930–1931)
- Op. 39: The Limpid Stream (also translated as The Bright Stream), three acts (1934–1935; some numbers recycled from Op. 27)
- The Lady and the Hooligan, one act (7 scenes) (1962; compiled and arranged from the scores of Ops. 27, 39, 40, 50a, 95, and 97 by Levon Atovmyan)
- The Dreamers, four acts (1975; compiled from the scores of Ops. 22 and 27 by the composer and Sergei Sapozhnikov)

=== Film scores ===
- Op. 18: Music to the silent film The New Babylon for small orchestra (1929)
- Op. 26: Music to the film Alone (1930–1931)
- Op. 30: Music to the film Golden Mountains (1931)
- Op. 33: Music to the film Counterplan (1932)
- Op. 36: Music to the animated film The Tale of the Priest and of His Workman Balda for chamber orchestra (1933–1934)
- Op. 38: Music to the film Love and Hate (Russian: Любовь и ненависть) (1934)
- Op. 41: Music to the film Girl Friends (1934–1935)
- Op. 41a: Music to the film The Youth of Maxim (1934–1935)
- Op. 45: Music to the film The Return of Maxim (1936–1937)
- Op. 48: Music to the film Volochayev Days (1936–1937)
- Op. 50: Music to the film The Vyborg Side (1938)
- Op. 51: Music to the film Friends (1938)
- Op. 52: Music to the film The Great Citizen, first part (1938)
- Op. 53: Music to the film The Man with the Gun (1938)
- Op. 55: Music to the film The Great Citizen, second part (1939)
- Op. 56: Music to the animated film The Silly Little Mouse (1939)
- Op. 59: Music to the film The Adventures of Korzinkina (1940)
- Op. 64: Music to the film Zoya (1944)
- Op. 71: Music to the film Simple People (1945)
- Op. 75: Music to the film The Young Guard (1947–1948)
- Op. 76: Music to the film Pirogov (1947)
- Op. 78: Music to the film Michurin (1948)
- Op. 80: Music to the film Meeting on the Elbe for voices and piano (1948)
- Op. 82: Music to the film The Fall of Berlin (1949)
- Op. 85: Music to the film Belinsky for orchestra and chorus (1950)
- Op. 89: Music to the film The Unforgettable Year 1919 (1951)
- Op. 95: Music to the film Song of the Great Rivers (1954)
- Op. 97: Music to the film The Gadfly (1955)
- Op. 99: Music to the film The First Echelon (1955–1956)
- Op. 105a: Music to the film Moscow, Cheryomushki (1962)
- Op. 111: Music to the film Five Days, Five Nights (1960)
- Op. 114b: Music to the film Katerina Izmailova (1966)
- Op. 116: Music to the film Hamlet after Shakespeare for orchestra (1963–1964)
- Op. 120: Music to the film A Year is Like a Lifetime for orchestra (1965)
- Op. 132: Music to the film Sofiya Perovskaya (1967)
- Op. 137: Music to the film King Lear after Shakespeare (1970)
- Music to the film Gogoliad after Gogol (1973; unfinished)

=== Incidental music ===
- Op. 19: Music to the comedy The Bedbug by Mayakovsky (1929)
- Op. 24: Music to the play The Gunshot by Bezymensky (1929)
- Op. 25: Music to the play Virgin Soil by Gorbenko and L'vov (1930)
- Op. 28: Music to the play Rule, Britannia! by Adrian Piotrovsky (1931)
- Op. 31: Music to the stage revue Hypothetically Murdered by Vasili Voyevodin and E. Riss (1931)
- Op. 32: Music to the play Hamlet by Shakespeare (1931–1932)
- Op. 37: Music to the play The Human Comedy after Balzac for small orchestra (1933–1934)
- Op. 44: Music to the play Hail, Spain by Afinogenov (1936)
- Op. 58a: Music to the play King Lear by Shakespeare (1940)
- Op. 63: Music to the spectacle Native Country, suite Native Leningrad (1942)
- Op. 66: Music to the spectacle Russian River for soloists, choir and orchestra (1944)
- Op. 72: Two Songs to the spectacle Victorious Spring after Svetlov for voices and orchestra (1945)

=== Choral ===
- The Oath to the People's Commissar for bass, chorus and piano (1941)
- Songs of a Guard's Division ("The Fearless Regiments Are On the Move"), marching song for bass and mixed chorus with simple accompaniment for bayan or piano (1941)
- Russian Folk Songs for chorus (1943)
- Three Russian Folk Songs for two soloists and chorus with piano accompaniment (1943)
- Op. 74: Poem of the Motherland, cantata for mezzo-soprano, tenor, two baritones, chorus and orchestra (1947)
- Rayok (Little Paradise) for four voices, chorus and piano (1948)
- Op. 81: Song of the Forests, oratorio after Dolmatovsky for tenor, bass soli, mixed & boys' chorus and orchestra (1949)
- Op. 86a: The Homeland Hears for chorus and tenor soloist with wordless chorus (1951)
- Op. 88: Ten Poems on Texts by Revolutionary Poets for chorus and boys' chorus a cappella (1951)
- Op. 90: The Sun Shines over Our Motherland, cantata after Dolmatovsky for mixed & boys' chorus and orchestra (1952)
- Op. 104: Cultivation: Two Russian Folk Song Arrangements for chorus a cappella (1957)
- Op. 119: The Execution of Stepan Razin, cantata after Yevtushenko for bass, mixed chorus and orchestra (1964)
- Op. 124: Two Choruses after Aleksandr Davidenko for chorus and orchestra (1962)
- Op. 136: Loyalty, eight ballads after Dolmatovsky for unaccompanied male chorus (1970)

=== Vocal ===
- Op. 4: Two Fables of Krylov for mezzo-soprano, female chorus and chamber orchestra (1922)
- Op. 21: Six Romances on Texts by Japanese Poets for tenor and orchestra (1928–1932)
- From Karl Marx to Our Own Days, symphonic poem for solo voices, chorus and orchestra (1932)
- Impromptu: Madrigal, for voice and piano (1933)
- Op. 46: Four Romances on Verses by Pushkin for bass and piano (1936–1937)
- Seven Arrangements of Finnish Folk Songs for soloists (soprano and tenor) and chamber ensemble (1939)
- Op. 62: Six Romances on Verses by English Poets for bass and piano (1942)
- Patriotic Song after Dolmatovsky for voices (1943)
- "Song About the Red Army" after Golodny (1943)
- Op. 79: From Jewish Folk Poetry, song cycle for soprano, contralto, tenor and piano (1948)
- Op. 79a: From Jewish Folk Poetry, song cycle for soprano, contralto, tenor and orchestra (1948)
- Op. 80b: Three Songs from Meeting on the Elbe for voice and piano (1956)
- Op. 84: Two Romances on Verses by Lermontov for male voice and piano (1950)
- Op. 86: Four Songs to Words by Dolmatovsky for voice and piano (1951)
- Op. 91: Four Monologues on Verses by Pushkin for bass and piano (1952)
- Greek Songs for voice and piano (1952–1953)
- Pendozalis, Greek Song for voice and piano (1954)
- October Dawn, song for soloists and chorus (1954)
- Op. 98: Five Romances on Verses by Dolmatovsky for bass and piano (1954)
- Op. 98a: "There Were Kisses", song after Dolmatovsky for voice and piano (1954)
- Op. 100: Spanish Songs for (mezzo)soprano and piano (1956)
- Op. 109: Satires (Pictures of the Past), Five Romances on Verses by Sasha Chorny for soprano and piano (1960) (arranged for voice and orchestra by B. Tishchenko, 1980)
- Op. 121: Five Romances on Texts from the Magazine Krokodil for bass and piano (1965)
- Op. 123: "Preface to the Complete Collection of My Works and Brief Reflections on this Preface" for bass and piano (1966)
- Op. 127: Seven Romances on Poems by Alexander Blok for soprano, violin, cello and piano (1967)
- Op. 128: Romance "Spring, Spring" to Verses by Pushkin for bass and piano (1967)
- Op. 140: Six Romances on Verses by English Poets for bass and chamber orchestra (1971)
- Op. 143: Six Poems by Marina Tsvetayeva, suite for contralto and piano (1973)
- Op. 143a: Six Poems by Marina Tsvetayeva, suite for contralto and orchestra (1973)
- Op. 145: Suite on Verses of Michelangelo Buonarroti for bass and piano (1974)
- Op. 145a: Suite on Verses by Michelangelo Buonarroti for bass and orchestra (1975)
- Op. 146: Four Verses of Captain Lebyadkin to texts by Dostoevsky for bass and piano (1975)

=== Orchestrations of music by other composers ===
- Orchestration of I Waited for Thee in the Grotto by Rimsky-Korsakov for soprano and orchestra (1921)
- Op. 16: Tahiti-Trot for orchestra (1928)
- Op. 17: Pastorale and Capriccio: Two Pieces by Domenico Scarlatti for wind orchestra (1928)
- Orchestration of The Internationale by Pierre De Geyter (1937)
- Op. 58: Orchestration of the opera Boris Godunov by Modest Mussorgsky (1939–1940)
- Orchestration of Wiener Blut by Johann Strauss II (1940)
- Orchestration of Vergnügungszug by Johann Strauss II (1940)
- Orchestration of 27 Romances and Songs Arrangements (1941)
- Orchestration of Eight British and American Folk Songs for voice(s) and orchestra (1943)
- Orchestration and completion of Rothschild's Violin by Venyamin Fleishman (1944)
- Op. 106: Re-orchestration of Khovanshchina by Modest Mussorgsky (1959)
- Orchestration of Songs and Dances of Death by Modest Mussorgsky for voice and orchestra (1962)
- Op. 125: Re-orchestration of the Cello Concerto in A minor by Robert Schumann (1963)
- Re-orchestration of the Cello Concerto No. 1 by Boris Tishchenko (1969)
- Orchestration of Mephistopheles' Song of the Flea by Ludwig van Beethoven (1975)

=== Transcriptions of music by other composers ===
- Reduction for mixed choir and piano four-hands of the Symphony of Psalms by Igor Stravinsky (circa early 1930s)
- Reduction for two pianos of the Symphonie Liturgique by Arthur Honegger (1947)
- Reduction for piano four-hands of the second movement from the Symphony No. 10 by Gustav Mahler (fragment; late 1920s)

== In chronological order ==
Op. number	Title	Instrumentation	Year	Notes
	Five Piano Pieces (The Soldier, Fiery Sonata, The Noise of a Train, The Storm, The Tempest)	Piano	1914–1915	Lost. Shostakovich used a theme from this work in "Immortality" from the Suite on Verses of Michelangelo Buonarroti.
	Hymn to Freedom	Piano	1915–1916	Lost
	Taras Bulba (based on the eponymous story by Nikolai Gogol)	Opera (instrumentation unknown)	1915–1916	Lost
	Revolutionary Symphony	Orchestra	1917–April 1918	Partially lost
	Funeral March in Memory of the Victims of the Revolution	Piano	January 1918	Originally assigned Op. 5 along with Nostalgia. Dedicated to the memories of Kadets Fyodor Kokoshkin and Andrei Shingaryov, who were murdered on January 20, 1918, at the Mariinskaya Hospital.
	Nostalgia	Piano	1918	Originally assigned Op. 5 along with Funeral March in Memory of the Victims of the Revolution. Alternately known as Melancholia and The Soldier Reminiscing About his Homeland, which is unrelated to "The Soldier" from the Five Piano Pieces.
	Piano Pieces from the Exercise Book "1919" (Piece in C major, Prelude-March, In the Forest)	Piano	1919	
	Variations on Mikhail Glinka's "The Lark"	Piano	1919	Unfinished
	Bagatelle	Piano	1919	Dedicated to Marianna Fyodorovna Gramenitskaya.
	Two Preludes	Piano	1919	Originally assigned Op. 1. Second piece is a revised version of the Bagatelle; dedicated to Boris Kustodiev.
	Exercise Pieces	Piano	1919–1920	Consists of six pieces, the fifth of which is based on "In the Forest".
	Fantasy	Piano duo	1919–1920	Dedicated to Alexander Glazunov.
	Exercise Piece	Piano duo	1919–1920	Incomplete; theme reused in "The Ass and the Nightingale" from Two Fables of Ivan Krylov.
	Three Pieces (Minuet, Prelude, and Intermezzo)	Piano	1919–1920 (possibly earlier)	Last piece incomplete. Extant manuscript, which was not written in Shostakovich's hand, was preserved by Alexandra Rozanova, who had been his piano teacher 1917–spring 1919.
1	Scherzo in F♯ minor	Orchestra	1919 (or 1920–1921)	Based on a surviving movement from the partially destroyed early Piano Sonata in B minor.
	Prelude	Cello	1920–1921	Incomplete
	The Gypsies (based on the eponymous narrative poem by Alexander Pushkin)	Opera (instrumentation unknown)	1920–1921	Incomplete. Only the vocal and piano score is extant.
	Piano Sonata in B minor	Piano	1920–1921	Incomplete. Third movement orchestrated and assigned Op. 1. Part of the slow movement was orchestrated for an early attempt at a symphony, then later incorporated into the Piano Trio No. 1.
2	Eight Preludes	Piano	1919–1921	Manuscript was destroyed by Shostakovich, but copies survived.
	Five Preludes	Piano	1921	Selected by Shostakovich from the Eight Preludes as his contribution to an incomplete collaborative cycle of 24 preludes in all keys composed with fellow students Grigori Klements and Pavel Feldt.
	Orchestration of the first movement from Ludwig van Beethoven's Piano Sonata No. 32	Orchestra	1921–1922	Partially lost
	Orchestration of the second movement from Ludwig van Beethoven's Piano Sonata No. 8	Orchestra	1921–1922	Premiered in Schwerin, Germany, on March 2, 2020.
	Orchestration of the Fugue No. 7 in E♭ major from Johann Sebastian Bach's The Well-Tempered Clavier, Book II	Small orchestra	1921–1922	
	Orchestration of Johannes Brahms' "Rhapsody" from the Klavierstücke, Op. 119	Orchestra	1921–1922	Partially lost
3	Theme and Variations in B♭ major	Orchestra	1921–1922	Dedicated to Nikolai Alexandrovich Sokolov.
	Three Pieces (Humoreske, Fugicha, Chromatic Fugue)	Piano	1921–1922	Partially lost
	In the Beginning Was...	Soprano, contralto, tenor, and bass, or SATB choir	1921–1922	Partially lost. Title is likely a reference to the Gospel of John.
	Arrangement of Nikolai Rimsky-Korsakov's "I Waited for Thee in a Grotto"	Soprano and orchestra	1921–1922	Premiered in Moscow in 1980.
	Orchestration of Franz Schubert's Military March No. 1	Orchestra	1921–1922	Partially lost
	Orchestration of the fifth movement from Robert Schumann's Bilder aus Osten	Orchestra	1921–1922	Partially lost
5	Three Fantastic Dances	Piano	1922	Originally published as Op. 1. Shostakovich orchestrated the first dance for a class exercise (unpublished).
6	Suite in F♯ minor	Two pianos	1922	Dedicated to the memory of Dmitri Boleslavovich Shostakovich. The composer revised the score according to the instructions of his teacher Maximilian Steinberg, but destroyed this version after one performance.
	Seven Fugues	Piano	1922–1923	The fifth fugue quotes the second Kyrie eleison from Bach's Mass in B minor.
	Rusalochka (based on The Little Mermaid by Hans Christian Andersen)	Ballet (instrumentation unknown)	1922–1923	Shostakovich projected completing the ballet in summer 1924 in anticipation of its forthcoming scheduled premiere, but stopped work on it in December 1923, then destroyed the score in 1926.
4	Two Fables of Ivan Krylov	Mezzo-soprano and piano	1922	Arranged and revised for mezzo-soprano (with unison female chorus ad libitum in "The Ass and the Nightingale") and orchestra in 1924.
8	Piano Trio No. 1 in C minor (alternatively known as Poem)	Piano, violin, and cello	1923	The work's last 22 measures, which are missing in the manuscript score, were completed by Boris Tishchenko in 1981.
	Dance	Piano	November 30, 1923	Dedicated to Zoya Shostakovich; work later reused in the score to Alone.
	Piano Quintet	Two violins, viola, cello, and piano	1923	Originally assigned Op. 7. Scherzo was later reused and developed in the Scherzo, Op. 7.
	Piano Piece	Piano	1922–1924	
9	Three Pieces (Fantasia, Prelude, Scherzo)	Cello and piano	December 30, 1923 – January 10, 1924	A fourth piece was destroyed immediately upon completion. The entire work is now lost, save for a sketch of the "Fantasia".
	Scherzo	Orchestra	1923–1924	Probably destroyed in 1926.
	Suite for Violin and Piano	Violin and piano	1923–1924	Lost. Dedicated to Veniamin Iosifovich Sher.
	Piano Sonata	Piano	1923–1924	Lost. Two letters by Shostakovich and an entry in Steinberg's diary attest to its existence.
7	Scherzo in E♭ major	Orchestra	1923–1924	Arranged from the scherzo of the incomplete 1923 Piano Quintet.
10	Symphony No. 1 in F minor	Orchestra	1924–1925	Originally assigned Op. 11.
11	Two Pieces	String octet	1924–1925	Originally assigned Op. 10. Drafts survive of a fugue that was planned to be the third piece.
12	Piano Sonata No. 1	Piano	1926	Originally named October or October Sonata.
	Piano Concerto	Piano and orchestra	1926	Only sketches remain. A solo trumpet part similar to the one later used in Op. 35 may have been planned.
13	Aphorisms	Piano	1927	Its ten pieces were selected from an original set of twelve.
14	Symphony No. 2 in B major "To October"	Orchestra and chorus	1927	
16	Tahiti Trot (Arrangement of the song "Tea for Two" by Vincent Youmans)	Orchestra	1928	Shostakovich slightly modified the work for use in The Golden Age on the request of Alexander Gauk.
	Main Street	Orchestra	1927	Partial orchestration of a "synesthetic stage composition" by Mikhail Mikhailov, based on a text by Demyan Bedny.
15	The Nose (based on Gogol)	Vocal soloists, chorus, and orchestra	1927–1928	Suite arranged from the opera assigned Op. 15a.
17	Two Pieces by Domenico Scarlatti	Wind orchestra	1928	Arranged from the versions by Carl Tausig.
18	Music to the silent film The New Babylon	Small orchestra	1928–1929	Originally assigned Op. 17. Suite assigned Op. 18a.
19	Incidental music to the play The Bedbug by Vladimir Mayakovsky	Orchestra	1928–1929	Vsevolod Meyerhold offered Shostakovich to compose the incidental music for Mayakovsky's play after his first choice, Sergei Prokofiev, refused. Suite assigned Op. 19a. Orchestral versions of three numbers possibly lost. These have been reorchestrated from piano scores by Mark Fitz-Gerald.
23	Two pieces for insertion into Erwin Dressel's opera Armer Columbus	SATB chorus and orchestra	1929	
20	Symphony No. 3 in E♭ major "The First of May"	SATB chorus and orchestra	1929	Originally named A May Symphony.
22	The Golden Age, ballet in three acts	Orchestra	1929–1930	Originally named Dynamiada. Performance of the suite, assigned Op. 22a, preceded that of the ballet itself. The suite originally contained seven movements, although the number of movements and dances chosen varied widely in subsequent performances, with one five-movement version including a rearrangement of Tahiti Trot. Its definitive four-movement form was assembled in 1934.
24	Incidental music to the play The Gunshot by Alexander Bezymensky	Orchestra	1929	Originally assigned Op. 22.
	Arrangement of the "Song of the Volga Boatmen"	Bass and orchestra	1929	Premiered on December 25, 1930.
	Reduction of the first movement from the Symphony No. 10 by Gustav Mahler	Piano four-hands	late 1920s	Incomplete
26	Music to the film Alone	Orchestra	1930–1931	In addition to Shostakovich's suite, Op. 26a, Gennady Rozhdestvensky also assembled a three-movement suite.
25	Incidental music to the play Virgin Soil by Arkadi Gorbenko and Nikolai Lvov	Orchestra	1930	Not included in the new collected works edition of Shostakovich's music. Some numbers reused in The Bolt and The Limpid Stream.
27	The Bolt, ballet in three acts	Orchestra	1930–1931	Alexander Gauk arranged a suite from the ballet, Op. 27a, sometimes also titled "Ballet Suite No. 5". Shortly thereafter, Shostakovich compiled his own suite, which dropped two movements, as well as movement titles which referred to the original ballet libretto.
28	Incidental music to the play Rule, Britannia! by Adrian Piotrovsky	Orchestra	1931	
	Impromptu	Viola and piano	1931	Originally assigned Op. 33. Dedicated to Vadim Borisovsky; the manuscript was discovered in his documents stored at the Moscow State Central Archive in 2007. The manuscript is dated May 2, 1931.
31	Incidental music to the music-hall show Hypothetically Murdered by Vsevolod Voyevodin and Yevgeny Ryss	Orchestra	1931	All but two numbers from the orchestral score are lost. The remainder exists only in piano score, a selection of which were compiled and orchestrated into a suite by Gerard McBurney.
30	Music to the film Golden Mountains	Orchestra and organ	1931	Suite assigned Op. 30a. When the film was re-released in 1936, its epilogue, which included a scene of striking workers accompanied by a fugue for organ and orchestra, was cut. The fugue had been criticized during the campaign against musical formalism for being an unsuitable musical depiction of organized labor.
	Two Pieces (Elegy and Polka)	Two violins, viola, and cello	1931	Originally assigned Op. 36. Dedicated to the Jean-Baptiste Villaume Quartet. The "Elegy" is an arrangement of Katerina's aria from Act I, scene 3 of Lady Macbeth of the Mtsensk District, while the "Polka" is an arrangement of "Once Upon a Time in Geneva" from The Golden Age.
32	Incidental music to the play Hamlet by William Shakespeare	Voices and orchestra	1931–1932	Suite assigned Op. 32a. Orchestral scores of five numbers are lost and exist only in piano scores. An additional two numbers were composed for a production of Hamlet in 1954.
21	Six Romances on Texts by Japanese Poets	Tenor and orchestra	1928–1932	Dedicated to Nina Vasilyevna Varzar, Shostakovich's first wife. Originally a tripartite work for tenor and piano composed in 1928 and assigned Op. 16. In 1931–1932, Shostakovich added three more songs.
	From Karl Marx to our Own Days	Solo voices, chorus and orchestra	1932	Unfinished and lost. Five movements may have been planned, of which one was possibly completed.
	The Big Lightning	Vocal soloists, chorus, and orchestra	1932	May originally have been named Powder in the Nail.
	Orango (satirical opera in three acts with a prologue based on a libretto by Alexei Tolstoy and Alexander Starchakov)	Vocal soloists, SATB chorus, and orchestra	1932	Piano score discovered in 2006 in the archives of the Shostakovich family, which was subsequently orchestrated by Gerard McBurney. Premiered in Los Angeles on December 2, 2011.
	Incidental music to the play On Combat Course by Arkadi Gorbenko, Nikolai Lvov, and Mikhail Sokolovsky	Chorus and orchestra	1932	Co-composed with Feodosiy Rubtsov. Although posters issued by TRAM credit Shostakovich, his involvement is considered unlikely.
33	Music to the film Counterplan	Chorus and orchestra	1932	The "Song of the Counterplan", with lyrics by Boris Kornilov, became one of Shostakovich's most famous works and a popular standard of Soviet song. Shostakovich reused it in his score to Michurin and his opera Moscow, Cheryomushki. Jean Renoir used it in his 1936 documentary La vie est à nous and was adapted by Harold Rome during World War II as "The Hymn of the United Nations".
29	Lady Macbeth of the Mtsensk District, opera in four acts based on the eponymous novella by Nikolai Leskov	Vocal soloists, SATB chorus, brass band, and orchestra	1930–1932	Libretto by Alexander Preis. The 1935 edition of the piano score includes over fifty amendments made to his text by Shostakovich, who was profoundly dissatisfied with its use of scatological terminology. Suite assigned Op. 29a. Sources conflict as to the number of movements chosen for the suite by Shostakovich.
	Passacaglia	Organ	1932	Sources conflict as to whether the Passacaglia was conceived as an autonomous piece of music or originally intended for use as an interlude in performances of Lady Macbeth of the Mtsensk District.
	Orchestration of the overture to Ivan Dzerzhinsky's operetta The Green Company	Orchestra	1931	Lost
	Madrigal (Impromptu)	Voice and piano	1933	Composed and first performed during a birthday party for Lyubov Berg, secretary of MALEGOT. Title page states: "Words by Mikhail Pravdin, music by Dmitri Shostakovich, idea by Samuil Zinkovsky". First public performance by Larisa Shevchenko accompanied by Sofia Khentova in Kiev in 1983. It was first published in 2015. The original manuscript is lost, but a photocopy is preserved in the Shostakovich Archives in Moscow.
34	24 Preludes	Piano	1932–1933	
35	Piano Concerto No. 1	Piano, solo trumpet, and strings	1933	Originally assigned Op. 34.
	"I Love..."	Tenor and piano	1933	Nearly completed. Text possibly by Shostakovich.
37	Incidental music to the play The Human Comedy by Pavel Sukhotin, based on the eponymous cycle of novels by Honoré de Balzac	Small orchestra	1933–1934	Shostakovich also orchestrated pieces by Beethoven and Fritz Kreisler for use in his incidental music.
	Suite for Jazz Orchestra No. 1	Chamber ensemble	1934	Originally assigned Op. 38.
	Four Fugues (C major, A minor, G major, E minor)	Piano	1934	The second fugue was reused with little alteration in Op. 87.
	Moderato	Cello and piano	1934	Dating uncertain; possibly a sketch for the Cello Sonata.
40	Sonata for Cello and Piano	Cello and piano	1934	
	Narodvolotsy	Opera (instrumentation unknown)	1934	Intended to be the second installment of a "Soviet Ring of the Nibelung", following Lady Macbeth of the Mtsensk District. The opera was abandoned after the death of Sergei Kirov. Some of its surviving music is related to the Four Fugues and Fourth Symphony.
38	Music to the film Love and Hate	Female chorus and orchestra	1934	Original score lost. Only piano sketches for eight cues and a published version of one of the film's songs are extant. Score reconstructed from the original soundtrack by Mark Fitz-Gerald.
36	Music to the animated film The Tale of the Priest and of his Servant Balda	Narrator, vocal soloists, SATB chorus, and orchestra	1933–1934	The film was never completed and what remained was destroyed during the siege of Leningrad in 1941, save for an approximately 200 ft (61 m) strip with the "Bazaar" scene. Original score is partially lost. Suite assigned Op. 36a, although its movements differ from another suite compiled by the composer that was premiered on June 1, 1935, by the Leningrad Philharmonic Orchestra conducted by Alexander Melik-Pashayev. Vadim Bibergan and Sofia Khentova have both produced performable completions.
	Funeral March on the Death of Sergei Kirov	Unknown	December 1934	Lost. Existence attested in the meeting records of the Leningrad branch of the Union of Soviet Composers, which reported that Shostakovich responded to Kirov's death with a "small funeral march".
	Suite for Bassoon and Piano	Bassoon and piano	1934	Only an eight-measure sketch remains.
	Unfinished Symphony	Orchestra	1934–1935	Incomplete draft of earlier and mostly unrelated version of the Fourth Symphony.
39	The Limpid Stream, ballet in three acts	Orchestra	1934–1935	Suite assigned Op. 39a. Sources conflict as to the dating and authorship of the suite.
41	Music to the film The Youth of Maxim	Soprano solo and orchestra	1934–1935	Only the film's overture and a number of sketches survive.
41a	Music to the film Girlfriends	Male choir, three female voices, wind band, string quartet, and orchestra	1934–1935	Dedicated to Romain Rolland. Partially lost. Score reconstructed from the original soundtrack recording by Mark Fitz-Gerald. Excerpts from Shostakovich's String Quartet No. 1 were added with permission from the composer upon the film's restoration in the 1960s. One of the film's cues is based on music from Vincenzo Bellini's Norma.
42	Five Fragments	Small orchestra	1935	Originally assigned Op. 43.
43	Symphony No. 4 in C minor	Orchestra	1935–1936	Original score lost during the siege of Leningrad. Only transcription for two pianos as Op. 43a and instrumental parts for the cancelled premiere survived. The latter were discovered in 1961, whereupon the score was reconstructed by Boris Shalman, librarian of the Leningrad Philharmonic Orchestra.
44	Incidental music to the play Salute to Spain! by Alexander Afinogenov	Orchestra and chorus	1936	Shostakovich transposed one of the play's numbers, "Song of Rosita", from B minor to F♯ minor and gifted it to his sister Zoya for her birthday on August 24, 1939.
	"The Devils"	High voice and piano	1936	Only sketches extant. Text by Pushkin. Possibly intended for Op. 46.
45	Music to the film The Return of Maxim	Solo voice, male choir, and orchestra	1936–1937	
46	Four Romances on Verses by Alexander Pushkin	Bass and piano	1936–1937	Originally planned as a twelve-song cycle. Shostakovich's orchestration of the first three songs, which according to Khentova was made in the 1960s, assigned Op. 46a.
48	Music to the film Volochayev Days	Male choir and orchestra	1936–1937	A song from the film, "Where the Waters Ripple", was reused by Shostakovich in his symphonic poem October. He also considered composing an opera based on the film.
47	Symphony No. 5 in D minor	Orchestra	1937	Sources unclear as to whether Shostakovich completed the symphony on July 27, 1937, or in September/October.
	Orchestration of Pierre De Geyter's "The Internationale"	Brass band and orchestra	1937	Premiered in Novosibirsk, Russian SFSR, on October 4, 1941, by the Leningrad Philharmonic Orchestra conducted by Yevgeny Mravinsky.
	Transcription of Igor Stravinsky's Symphony of Psalms	Piano duet	1937	Shostakovich made the transcription for use in his classes at the Leningrad Conservatory, where he taught composition and orchestration. In 1962, he presented the score to Stravinsky during the latter's trip to the Soviet Union.
49	String Quartet No. 1 in C major	Two violins, viola, and cello	1938	Some sources append the subtitle Springtime to the quartet. The order of the outer movements was originally planned to be in reverse to their final form. Parts of the second movement were added to the soundtrack of Girlfriends when the film was re-released in the 1960s.
51	Music to the film Friends	SATB chorus and orchestra	1938	A cue for a cappella chorus is published separately as "Vocalise".
53	Music to the film The Man with the Gun	Brass band and orchestra	1938	The original film score is lost.
52	Music to the film The Great Citizen, Part I	Orchestra	1938	
50	Music to the film The Vyborg Side	Orchestra	1938	Manuscript lost. Despite being assigned Op. 50a, Levon Atovmyan's Maxim suite includes no music from The Vyborg Side.
	Suite for Jazz Orchestra No. 2	Chamber ensemble	1938	Sketches and piano score discovered by Manashir Yakubov in 1999. Originally scored for the same ensemble as the Suite for Jazz Orchestra No. 1, but Shostakovich expanded the instrumentation at the request of Viktor Knushevitzky. Title of this work was incorrectly used to refer to the unrelated Suite for Variety Orchestra. Original manuscript and instrumental parts are lost; Gerard McBurney completed his reconstruction and orchestration of the score in 2000. Shostakovich reused the main theme of the first movement, "Scherzo", in the second movement of his Symphony No. 8.
55	Music to the film The Great Citizen, Part II	Orchestra	1938–1939	Most of the score is lost.
56	Music to the animated film The Story of a Silly Baby Mouse	Narrator, vocal soloists, and orchestra	1939	Reconstructed by Boris Tiles based on the piano score and instrumental parts. Version with narrator and singers arranged by Andrew Cornall. Lullaby melody reused in finale of Op. 109.
54	Symphony No. 6 in B minor	Orchestra	1939	Originally published as Op. 53. The symphony's form and instrumentation diverged considerably from the descriptions he gave to the press. He had related that it would be a massive symphony for vocal soloists, chorus, and orchestra dedicated to the memory of Vladimir Lenin.
	Suite on Finnish Themes	Soloists, chorus, chamber orchestra, piano	1939	
	The Twelve Chairs, operetta based on the eponymous novel by Ilf and Petrov	Unknown	1939	Unfinished. Shostakovich may not have developed the music beyond a few sketches.
	Arrangement of the Russian folk song "Dubinushka"	Bass and orchestra	Late 1930s	Manuscript discovered posthumously among Shostakovich's papers.
	Lenin Symphony	Vocal soloists, SATB chorus, and orchestra	1938–1940?	Shostakovich told the press that the symphony was inspired by Mayakovsky's poem "Vladimir Ilyich Lenin" and that it would set verses by Suleyman Stalsky and Zhambyl Zhabayuly. Gerard McBurney said that Shostakovich may never have worked on this score, despite his reports to the contrary given across a span of over two years. In December 1940, Shostakovich said he had failed in his pursuit of composing a "Lenin Cantata".
58a	Incidental music for the play King Lear by Shakespeare	Vocal soloists and orchestra	1940	Composed for a 1941 production by Grigori Kozintsev.
58	Reorchestration of Modest Mussorgsky's opera Boris Godunov	Vocal soloists, SATB chorus, orchestra	1939?–1940	Sources conflict as to whether Shostakovich began reorchestrating the opera in December 1939 or January 1940.
57	Piano Quintet in G minor	Two violins, viola, cello, and piano	1940	
59	Music to the film The Adventures of Korzinkina	SATB chorus, piano duet, and orchestra	1940	Precise number and order of cues for the film is unknown, but the manuscripts of at least 10 are held by the Shostakovich family. The score utilized music from Peter Ilyich Tchaikovsky's Swan Lake, Charles Gounod's Faust, and Shostakovich's orchestration of Mussorgsky's "Song of the Flea".
	Three Pieces (Prelude, Gavotte, Waltz)	Solo violin	1940	Originally assigned Op. 59; lost.
	Arrangement of Johann Strauss Jr.'s Vergnügungszug (Pleasure Train Polka)	Orchestra	1940	Orchestrated for use in a 1941 MALEGOT production of Strauss' Der Zigeunerbaron.
	Arrangement of Mussorgsky's "Song of the Flea"	Bass and orchestra	1940	
	Katyusha Maslova (opera based on Leo Tolstoy's novel Resurrection)	Unknown	1941	Commissioned by the Kirov Opera in 1940. Work ceased after Glavrepertkom banned Anatoly Marienhof's libretto in 1941. Only sketches are extant.
	Twenty-Seven Songs for the Front (arrangements of songs and arias by Dmitry Pokrass, Daniil Pokrass, Matvey Blanter, David Pritzker, Yuri Milyutin, Isaak Dunayevsky, Jean-Baptiste Weckerlin, Ludwig van Beethoven, Gioacchino Rossini, Georges Bizet, Ruggiero Leoncavallo, Alexey Verstovsky, Alexander Gurilyov, Alexander Dargomyzhsky, Modest Mussorgsky, Nikolai Rimsky-Korsakov, Mikhail Ippolitov-Ivanov, and Semyon Gulak-Artemovsky)	Voices, violin, and cello	1941	Prepared for ensembles organized by the Leningrad Conservatory to play music at the frontlines.
	"Song of the Regiments of the Guards"	Bass, SATB chorus, and piano	1941	
60	Symphony No. 7 in C major	Orchestra	1941	Dedication in the manuscript reads: "To my native city, Leningrad". March from the first movement reused in the score to the film The Fall of Berlin.
	"Ceremonial March" in D♭ major	Wind band	1941	May have been composed as early as 1939.
	Polka in F♯ minor	Harp duet	1941	Commissioned by Vera Dulova.
	"A Great Day Has Come"	Bass, chorus, and piano	1941	Text by Vissarion Sayanov. Composed for the Song and Dance Ensemble of the NKVD.
	Reorchestration of Johann Strauss Jr.'s operetta Wiener Blut	Unknown	1941	Project was never realized because of the German invasion of the Soviet Union.
	"Romance"	Voice and piano	1941	Text by Heinrich Heine; lost.
	The Gamblers (opera based on the eponymous play by Gogol)	Male voices and orchestra	1941–1942	Originally assigned Op. 63. Act I complete in piano score; full score missing last seven measures, which were orchestrated by Rozhdestvensky in 1981. Themes from the opera were reused in 1975 for the second movement of the Viola Sonata.
63	Native Leningrad (suite from the NKVD revue Fatherland)	Tenor, bass, SATB chorus, and orchestra	1942	Composed as a "tribute to the courage of the citizens of Leningrad". Shostakovich's suite was the first of a five-part collaborative revue produced by the Song and Dance Ensemble of the NKVD. Other composers who contributed music were Alexander Alexandrov, Viktor Bely, Dmitri Kabalevsky, Nikolai Chemberdzhi, and Zinovy Dunayevsky. Lyrics by Sergei Alymov.
62	Six Romances on Verses by British Poets (texts by Sir Walter Raleigh, Robert Burns, Shakespeare, and anonymous)	Bass and piano	1942	Each song is dedicated respectively to Levon Atovmyan, Nina Shostakovich, Isaak Glikman, Georgy Sviridov, Ivan Sollertinsky, and Vissarion Shebalin. The title in the manuscript score and first edition is Six Romances for Bass, while later sources erroneously use Six Romances on Verses by English Poets. In 1943, Shostakovich arranged the suite for large orchestra and bass as Op. 62a, which was never performed during his lifetime. In 1971, he made a further arrangement for chamber orchestra and bass that he assigned Op. 140.
61	Piano Sonata No. 2 in B minor	Piano	1943	
	Eight British and American Folk Songs (arrangements of the folk songs "The Sailor's Bride", "John Anderson, my jo", "Billy Boy", "Oh, the Oak and the Ash", "King Arthur's Servants", "Comin' Thro' the Rye", "Spring Round Dance", and "When Johnny Comes Marching Home")	Soprano, bass, and orchestra	1943	Originally a suite consisting of the first seven songs that was completed in May 1943, with the eighth added in July. The first confirmed performance of the complete cycle occurred on May 26, 1960.
65	Symphony No. 8 in C minor	Orchestra	1943	Dedicated to Yevgeny Mravinsky. Unofficially nicknamed the "Stalingrad Symphony" by the American press after its United States premiere An incomplete 125-measure portion of an alternate draft of the second movement, which includes piano, was published in Volume 8 of the DSCH New Collected Works.
	Anthem of the Soviet Union ("Glory to Our Soviet Fatherland")	SATB chorus and orchestra	1943	Text by Yevgeny Dolmatovsky. This was Shostakovich's first entry in the competition to replace De Geyter's "The Internationale" as the new Soviet national anthem, which was organized by Joseph Stalin in 1942–1943. McBurney says that it has not been determined whether this work has ever been performed, but Hulme cites that a performance was broadcast on All-Union Radio in February 1978.
	Anthem of the Soviet Union ("Unbreakable Union of Freeborn Republics")	SATB chorus and orchestra	1943	Text by Sergey Mikhalkov and El-Registan, which was also set Alexander Alexandrov, whose entry was the eventual winner in the national anthem competition. Shostakovich reused the melody of this setting in Russian River, Victorious Spring, and in Novorossiysk Chimes.
	Anthem of the Soviet Union ("Unbreakable Union of Freeborn Republics") (co-composed with Aram Khachaturian)	SATB chorus and orchestra	1943	Shostakovich's third entry in the national anthem competition was a collaborative composition with Khachaturian, which placed among the finalists.
	"Invincible Red Army" (co-composed with Khachaturian)	SATB chorus and orchestra	1943?	Text by Mikhail Golodniy. Neither its composition date nor its relevancy to the national anthem competition have been ascertained.
	Completion and partial orchestration of the opera Rothschild's Violin by Veniamin Fleishman (based on the eponymous short story by Anton Chekhov)	Voices and orchestra	1942–1944?	Libretto by Preis. Fleishman started to compose the opera in 1939, but his death during the siege of Leningrad in 1941 prevented him from completing it. Only a central portion of the remaining torso had been orchestrated by him.
64	Music to the film Zoya	SATB chorus and orchestra	1944	Originally assigned Op. 68. The score utilizes a chorus from Glinka's A Life for the Tsar and De Geyter's "The Internationale". Atovmyan's suite, which includes his orchestration of the Prelude No. 14 from Op. 34, assigned Op. 64a. According to Hulme, nine cues from the original score are missing.
67	Piano Trio No. 2 in E minor	Violin, cello, and piano	1944	Dedicated to the memory Ivan Sollertinsky.
68	String Quartet No. 2 in A Major	Two violins, viola, and cello	1944	Originally published as Op. 69. Dedicated to Shebalin.
66	Music to the revue Russian River (based on a libretto by Mikhail Volpin, Iosif Dobrovolsky, and Nikolai Erdman)	Soloists, choir, and orchestra	1944	Composed for the Song and Dance Ensemble of the NKVD. Partially lost. "The Battle of Stalingrad" number is based on Shostakovich's second entry for the 1943 national anthem contest.
	"A Toast to Our Motherland"	Tenor, SATB chorus, and piano	1944	Text by Iosif Utkin.
	"The Black Sea"	Bass, male choir, and piano	1944	Text by Alymov and N. Verkhovsky.
	Arrangement of the Scottish folk song "Annie Laurie"	Voice and chamber orchestra	1944	The instrumentation is nearly indistinguishable from that of the Eight British and American Folk Songs, for which it may have been originally intended.
69	Children's Notebook	Piano	1944–1945	Composed for Galina Shostakovich. The fanfare that initiates "Birthday" was reused in the Festive Overture, while "Clockwork Doll" reuses a theme from Op. 1.
70	Symphony No. 9 in E♭ major	Orchestra	1945	
	Murzilka	Piano	1944–1945	Probably composed by Shostakovich for his children around the time of the Children's Notebook.
	"Our Native Russia Has Gained Strength From Storms"	SATB chorus and orchestra	1945	Text by Stepan Shchipachev. Originally composed for use as the National Anthem of the RSFSR.
	Symphonic Fragment (first version of Symphony No. 9)	Orchestra	January 1945	Incomplete
	Violin Sonata	Violin and piano	1945	Left incomplete after first movement's double exposition. Themes reused in the first movement of the Tenth Symphony.
72	Two songs for the revue Victorious Spring (based on a libretto by Volpin, Dobrovolsky, and Erdman, with additional lyrics by Mikhail Svetlov)	Soprano, tenor, female choir, and orchestra	1945	Composed for the Song and Dance Ensemble of the NKVD. A third number, "Hymn of the People's Victory", is the same as "Final Song" from Russian River, with refashioned lyrics by Dolmatovsky.
71	Music to the film Simple People	Orchestra	1945	Banned in 1946 and not rescreened until 1956.
73	String Quartet No. 3 in F major	Two violins, viola, and cello	1946	Dedicated to the Beethoven Quartet.
74	Poem of the Motherland	Mezzo-soprano, tenor, two baritones, bass, SATB chorus, brass band, and orchestra	1947	Composed to celebrate the 30th anniversary of the October Revolution, but was never performed at any associated commemorative events. The coda reuses the closing fanfare theme from Op. 20.
76	Music to the film Pirogov	Brass band and orchestra	1947	Suite by Atovmyan assigned Op. 76a.
	Arrangement of Arthur Honegger's Symphonie Liturgique	Two pianos	1947	Shostakovich heard Honegger's symphony at the 1947 Prague Spring Festival. He composed a fair copy of his arrangement in the span of time he had access to the conductor's score between its two performances on May 16 and 17. It was intended for use in Shostakovich's composition classes, but he was fired from the Moscow and Leningrad Conservatories before he could use it. The manuscript was discovered posthumously.
	Three Pieces	Orchestra	1947–1948	Originally assigned Op. 77. McBurney lists the score as lost, but also confirms Hulme's statement that the manuscript is extant.
77	Violin Concerto No. 1 in A minor	Violin and orchestra	1947–1948	Dedicated to David Oistrakh, who also edited the solo violin part. Originally published as Op. 99. According to correspondence between Shostakovich and Oistrakh in 1952, a private recording of the concerto was to be made in the composer's apartment in an arrangement for violin and two pianos. According to Igor Oistrakh, this recording took place, with Shostakovich and Lev Oborin playing the piano parts, although this is unverified. Neither the tape nor the arrangement of the concerto have been found.
75	Music to the film The Young Guard	Orchestra	1947–1948	Originally assigned Op. 76. Suite by Atovmyan assigned Op. 75a.
79	From Jewish Folk Poetry	Soprano, contralto, tenor, and piano	1948	Despite being assigned Op.79a, the version for voices and orchestra preceded the one with piano accompaniment.
78	Music to the film Michurin	SATB chorus, brass band, and orchestra	1948	Originally developed as a play entitled Life is in Bloom. Suite by Atovmyan assigned Op. 78a.
80	Music to the film Encounter at the Elbe	Tenor, SATB chorus, and orchestra	1948	Four cues are lost. Suite by Shostakovich assigned Op. 80a.
	Antiformalistic Rayok	Four voices, chorus, and piano	1948	Lev Lebedinsky's claim to have significantly contributed to its libretto are dubious.
	"Hymn to Moscow"	SATB chorus and piano	1948	Text by Ilya Frenkel. Probably related to a composition competition organized in 1948 by Georgy Popov.
	"Merry March"	Two pianos	1949	Dedicated to Maxim Shostakovich. Originally assigned Op. 81.
81	Song of the Forests	Tenor, bass, boys' chorus, SATB chorus, and orchestra	1949	Text by Dolmatovsky, who removed all references to Stalin and Stalinism in 1962.
83	String Quartet No. 4 in D major	String quartet	1949	Dedicated to Pyotr Williams.
82	Music to the film The Fall of Berlin	Orchestra	1949	Suite by Atovmyan assigned Op. 82a.
84	Two Romances on Verses by Mikhail Lermontov	Voice and piano	1950	According to Malcolm MacDonald, these songs were intended to be part of a larger song cycle.
	"Our Song"	Bass, SATB chorus, and piano	1950	Text by Konstantin Simonov. Originally intended for chorus and orchestra.
	"March of Peace Champions"	Chorus and piano	1950?	Text by Simonov.
85	Music to the film Belinsky	SATB chorus and orchestra	1950	Suite by Atovmyan assigned Op. 85a. According to Lev Danilovich, one of Shostakovich's Soviet biographers, the film was never released.
	"German March"	Woodwinds and percussion	1950	Only surviving contribution by Shostakovich for a film by Lev Arnshtam tentatively entitled Warmongers (Russian: Поджигатели войны, romanized: Podzhigateli voyny); a biopic about Georgi Dimitrov and his prosecution for alleged involvement in the Reichstag fire. Ideological bickering interrupted production in 1951. By the time the film was released in 1956, it had been significantly altered, renamed A Lesson in History, and was scored by Kara Karayev.
87	Twenty-Four Preludes and Fugues	Piano	1950–1951	
86	Four Songs to Words by Yevgeny Dolmatovsky	Voice and piano	1950–1951	The first song, "The Motherland Hears", originally scored for solo voice and a cappella chorus.
88	Ten Poems on Texts by Revolutionary Poets of the Late 19th and Early 20th Centuries	SATB chorus	1951	The sixth song, "The Ninth of January", is quoted in the Symphony No. 11.
	Ten Russian Folk Song Arrangements	Soloists, mixed chorus and piano	1951	Originally assigned Op. 89.
89	Music to the film The Unforgettable Year 1919	Piano, SATB chorus, and orchestra	1951	One cue, which in the film depicts the Red Army's assault on Krasnaya Gorka during the Russian Civil War, is occasionally played on its own as a single-movement piano concerto.
90	The Sun Shines Over Our Motherland	Boys' chorus, SATB Chorus, and orchestra	1952	Text by Dolmatovsky. Originally projected to be the first of a three-part work entitled Cantata About the Party. Subsequent movements, "The Standard-bearers of the 20th Century" and "Won in Persistent Struggles", never progressed beyond sketches.
91	Four Monologues on Verses by Alexander Pushkin	Bass and piano	1952	According to McBurney the cycle was never performed while Shostakovich was alive, but Khentova records that Askold Besedin sang it in recital during the 1964 Shostakovich Festival in Gorky.
92	String Quartet No. 5 in B♭ major	String quartet	1952	
	Music to the film Rimsky-Korsakov	Orchestra	1952	Shostakovich had been approached to compose the score after the death of Vladimir Shcherbachov, who had been the first choice. He composed six cues before ceding the job to Georgy Sviridov. Nevertheless, three of six cues that Shostakovich composed were used in the film uncredited.
	Russian Folksongs	Flute and piano	1952?	Collection of nineteen folk song arrangements.
	Greek Songs	Voice and piano	1952–1953	
	Arrangement of Joan Smith's song "Bird of Peace"	Voice and piano	1953	The song was awarded second place at a youth festival in Bucharest in 1953.
93	Symphony No. 10 in E minor	Orchestra	1953	
94	Concertino in A minor	Two pianos	1953	Dedicated to Maxim Shostakovich.
98	Five Romances on Verses by Yevgeny Dolmatovsky	Bass and piano	1954	Originally assigned Op. 95. Alternately known as Songs of Our Days. The cycle was later performed by Boris Gmyrya, who extensively revised the score with Shostakovich's approval.
95	Music to the film Song of the Great Rivers	SATB chorus and orchestra	1954	Alternately known as Unity and Seven Rivers. "Introduction" cue sets a text by Bertolt Brecht. An additional three cues depicting atomic warfare are unpublished. Manuscript score partially lost.
96	Festive Overture	Orchestra	1954	Sources conflict as to whether the work was composed in 1947 or 1954.
	Tarantella	Two pianos	1954	
	"There Were Kisses..."	Bass and piano	1954?	Text by Dolmatovsky. Originally composed for the Op. 89 cycle, but was excluded from it for reasons unknown.
97	Music to the film The Gadfly	Organ and orchestra	1955	Khachaturian had originally been assigned to score the film, but poor health forced him to discontinue work. Atovmyan's suite, which significantly alters the original music, assigned Op. 97a.
99	Music to the film The First Echelon	Orchestra	1955–1956	Suite by Atovmyan assigned Op. 99a.
100	Spanish Songs	Mezzo-soprano and piano	1956	Arrangements of Spanish folk songs.
101	String Quartet No. 6 in G major	Two violins, viola, and cello	1956	
	Suite for Variety Orchestra No. 1	Pops orchestra	after 1956	Compiled and arranged by Atovmyan. An editorial error in 1984 resulted in the work being often mistaken for the unrelated Suite for Jazz Orchestra No. 2.
102	Piano Concerto No. 2 in F major	Piano and orchestra	1957	Dedicated to Maxim Shostakovich.
103	Symphony No. 11 in G minor "The Year 1905"	Orchestra	1957	Along with the Russian revolutionary songs utilized in the symphony, Shostakovich also quoted an extract from Sviridov's operetta Sparks.
	Three Choruses for the Fortieth Anniversary of the October Revolution	SATB chorus and piano	1957	Manuscript lost.
	Eleven Variations on a Theme by Mikhail Glinka	Piano	1957	Based on a theme from A Life for the Tsar. Collaborative project with Eugen Kapp, Vissarion Shebalin, Andrei Eshpai, Rodion Shchedrin, Georgi Sviridov, Yuri Levitin, and Dmitry Kabalevsky to commemorate the centennial of Glinka's death. Shostakovich contributed variations VIII, IX, and XI.
104	Two Russian Folk Songs	SATB chorus	1957	Alternatively known as Cultivation.
105	Moscow, Cheryomushki, operetta in three acts based on a libretto by Vladimir Mass and Mikhail Chervinsky	Voices, SATB chorus, and orchestra	1958	The film version directed by Herbert Rappaport, which included new numbers by Shostakovich, assigned Op. 105a.
106	Orchestration and completion of Modest Mussorgsky's opera Khovanshchina	Voices, SATB chorus, and orchestra	1959	The end of Act II and the opera's epilogue are composed by Shostakovich. The film version directed by Vera Stroyeva assigned Op. 106a.
107	Cello Concerto No. 1 in E♭ major	Cello and orchestra	1959	Dedicated to Mstislav Rostropovich, who also edited the solo cello part.
108	String Quartet No. 7 in F♯ minor	Two violins, viola, and cello	1960	Dedicated to the memory of Nina Shostakovich.
109	Satires (Pictures of the Past)	Soprano and piano	1960	Texts by Sasha Chorny. Dedicated to Galina Vishnevskaya, who also devised the work's subtitle. Orchestration by Tishchenko published as Op. 109a.
110	String Quartet No. 8 in C minor	Two violins, viola, and cello	1960	Dedicated to "the memory of the victims of fascism and war".
111	Music to the film Five Days, Five Nights	Organ and orchestra	1960	Suite by Atoymyan, assigned Op. 111a, includes a quote from the "Ode to Joy" theme from Beethoven's Ninth Symphony.
	Novorossiysk Chimes (The Flame of Eternal Glory)	Orchestra	1960	Commissioned by the city of Novorossiysk to commemorate the "heroes of the Great Patriotic War". Based on Shostakovich's second entry for the 1943 contest to determine the new national anthem of the Soviet Union.
112	Symphony No. 12 in D minor "The Year 1917"	Orchestra	1961	
	Unfinished String Quartet	Two violins, viola, and cello	1961	Draft of a first movement for one of Shostakovich's first two unsuccessful attempts to compose a String Quartet No. 9. Complete score possibly destroyed by the composer. Completed by Roman Ledenyov.
113	Symphony No. 13 in B♭ minor	Bass, bass chorus, and orchestra	1962	
	Orchestration of Mussorgsky's Songs and Dances of Death	Soprano or bass and orchestra	1962	Dedicated to Vishnevskaya. Shostakovich transposed the last song, "The Field Marshal", down to B♭ minor in order to accommodate male singers with low registers.
114	Katerina Izamailova, opera in four acts based on the novella Lady Macbeth of the Mtsensk District by Leskov	Voices, SATB chorus, brass band, and orchestra	1956–1963	Final version of Op. 32, with a revised libretto by Isaak Glikman. Shostakovich extensively altered the musical material and repeatedly expressed his preference for Op. 114 over Op. 32. His suite of five entr'actes from the opera designated Op. 114a.
125	Reorchestration of Robert Schumann's Cello Concerto in A minor	Cello and orchestra	1963	Dedicated to Rostropovich
124	Two Choruses, arranged from the oratorio The Road to October by Alexander Davidenko	SATB chorus and orchestra	1963	Originally were not assigned an opus number.
115	Overture on Russian and Kirghiz Folk Themes	Orchestra	1963	Although the work utilizes real Kirghiz folk melodies, the "Russian" themes are folk-style melodies by Shostakovich.
116	Music to the film Hamlet	Orchestra	1963–1964	The manuscript score is preserved by the Shostakovich family. Suite by Atovmyan assigned Op. 116a.
117	String Quartet No. 9 in E♭ major	String quartet	1964	Dedicated to Irina Shostakovich, the composer's third wife.
118	String Quartet No. 10 in A♭ major	String quartet	1964	Dedicated to Mieczysław Weinberg
119	The Execution of Stepan Razin	Bass, SATB chorus, and orchestra	1964	Text by Yevtushenko
	Incidental music to Yevgeny Onegin (play by Nikolay Akimov based on the eponymous verse poem by Pushkin)	Orchestra	1964	Premiered January 1965. Orchestral parts and piano score held in the archives of the Mariinsky Theatre.
120	Music to the film A Year Is Like a Lifetime	Orchestra	1965	Suite by Atovmyan assigned Op. 120a.
121	Five Romances on Texts from the Magazine Krokodil	Bass and piano	1965	Orchestration by Tishchenko assigned Op. 121a.
122	String Quartet No. 11 in F minor	String quartet	1966	Dedicated to Vasily Shirinsky
123	Preface to the Complete Edition of My Works and a Brief Reflection on this Preface	Bass and piano	1966	Orchestration by Leonid Desyatnikov assigned Op. 123a.
126	Cello Concerto No. 2 in G minor	Cello and orchestra	1966	Dedicated to Rostropovich. First and third movements quoted in "To Anna Akhmatova" in Op. 143.
	Suite for Variety Orchestra No. 2 (Introduction, Waltz, Intermezzo, Finale)	Pops orchestra	before 1967	As with the Suite for Variety Orchestra No. 1, this was probably compiled and arranged by Atovmyan. Utilizes music from Alone, The Adventures of Korzinkina, Love and Hate, Pirogov, and the partially lost Suite for Jazz Orchestra No. 2; some of the source works had been unused in their original projects. First documented performance by the Chicago Symphony Orchestra conducted by Morton Gould in 1967.
127	Seven Songs on Poems by Alexander Blok	Soprano, violin, cello, and piano	1967	Dedicated to Vishnevskaya.
129	Violin Concerto No. 2 in C♯ minor	Violin and orchestra	1967	Dedicated to Oistrakh, who also edited the solo violin part. A 138-measure fragment of an earlier version of the first movement in F♯ minor is extant.
131	October	Orchestra	1967	One of its themes is based on the song "Where the Waters Ripple" from Volochayev Days.
132	Music to the film Sofiya Perovskaya	Female choir, children's choir, brass band, and orchestra	1967	
128	"Spring, Spring"	Bass and piano	1967	Text by Pushkin; intended to be the first in a four-part song cycle on his verses. Discovered posthumously. Orchestrated by Rozhdestvensky.
130	Funeral-Triumphal Prelude	Orchestra	1967	Dedicated "in memory of the heroes of the Battle of Stalingrad". Intended for use at Mamayev Kurgan.
133	String Quartet No. 12 in D♭ major	Two violins, viola, and cello	1968	
134	Sonata for Violin and Piano	Violin and piano	1968	Dedicated to Oistrakh and composed for his 60th birthday.
135	Symphony No. 14	Soprano, bass, string orchestra, and percussion	1969	Shostakovich adapted the vocal line of the tenth movement, "The Poet's Death", to fit Rainer Maria Rilke's original verses for publication in East Germany in 1970. Another version with the texts in their original languages was prepared by Jörg Morgener for Dietrich Fischer-Dieskau in 1971 with the composer's approval.
	Reorchestration of Boris Tishchenko's Cello Concerto No. 1	Cello and orchestra	1969	Tischchenko's 1963 original was for winds, percussion, and harmonium. Shostakovich presented the score to him as a 30th birthday gift on March 23, 1969.
	Quiet Flows the Don, based on the eponymous novel by Mikhail Sholokhov	Unknown	1965–1970?	Despite reports saying otherwise, it is probable that Shostakovich never worked on this opera.
136	Loyalty	Male chorus	1970	Texts by Dolmatovsky. Dedicated to Gustav Ernesaks.
137	Music to the film King Lear	SATB chorus and orchestra	1970	Includes reworked material from Op. 58a. A capella "People's Lamentation" also used in the String Quartet No. 13.
138	String Quartet No. 13 in B♭ minor	String quartet	1970	Dedicated to Vadim Borisovsky.
139	"March of the Soviet Militia"	Military band/Wind orchestra	1970	
140	Six Romances on Verses by British Poets	Bass and chamber orchestra	1971	Re-orchestration of Op. 62 premiered by Rudolf Barshai's Moscow Chamber Orchestra.
	"Yelabuga Nail"	Voice and piano	1971	Unpublished setting of poem by Yevgeny Yevtushenko.
141	Symphony No. 15 in A major	Orchestra	1971	
	Intervision	Orchestra	1971	Commissioned by the Intervision Network for use in its news broadcasts.
	Arrangement of Gaetano Braga's "Serenade"	Soprano, mezzo-soprano, violin, and piano	1972	Intended for use in Shostakovich's unrealized opera based on Anton Chekhov's "The Black Monk".
142	String Quartet No. 14 in F♯ major	String quartet	1973	Dedicated to Sergei Shirinsky.
143	Six Poems by Marina Tsvetayeva	Contralto and piano	1973	Orchestration as Op.143a.
	Music to the film Gogoliad (based on Gogol)	Orchestra	1973	Left incomplete upon director Grigori Kozintsev's death in May 1973.
144	String Quartet No. 15 in E♭ minor	String quartet	1974	
	String Quartet No. 16	String quartet	1974	Never realized
145	Suite on Verses of Michelangelo Buonarroti	Bass and piano	1974	Orchestration assigned Op.145a.
146	Four Verses of Captain Lebyadkin	Bass and piano	1974	Based on texts from the novel Demons by Fyodor Dostoyevsky. Orchestration by Tishchenko assigned Op. 146a.
	Orchestration of Beethoven's "Es war einmal ein König" ("Mephistopheles' Song of the Flea")	Bass and orchestra	1975	Text by Johann Wolfgang von Goethe from Faust.
147	Sonata for Viola and Piano	Viola and piano	1975	Dedicated to Fyodor Druzhinin.
	Symphony No. 16	Orchestra	1975	According to news reports in the West, Shostakovich had completed two movements. This was followed by an April 1976 report in Soviet Weekly that said "Shostakovich's last work" had been completed by Andrey Petrov and premiered. Neither Petrov's own catalog of compositions nor Maxim Shostakovich's recollections confirms this. The latter told Yevgeny Nesterenko that his father considered Op. 145a his "Sixteenth Symphony".
	Unidentified orchestral work	Orchestra	1975	Benjamin Britten and Mstislav Rostropovich mentioned this work in passing when they met for the final time in November 1976. Shostakovich was commissioned to compose this work for Rostropovich's first season as the music director of the National Symphony Orchestra, but died before he could complete it.
