= Op. 133 =

In music, Op. 133 stands for Opus number 133. Compositions that are assigned this number include:

- Beethoven – Grosse Fuge
- Prokofiev – Piano Concerto No. 6
- Schumann – Gesänge der Frühe
- Shostakovich – String Quartet No. 12
