= String Quartet No. 14 =

String Quartet No. 14 may refer to:

- String Quartet No. 14 (Beethoven) by Ludwig van Beethoven
- String Quartet No. 14 (Dvořák) by Antonín Dvořák
- String Quartet No. 14 (Hill) by Alfred Hill
- String Quartet No. 14 (Milhaud), Op. 291, No. 1, by Darius Milhaud
- String Quartet No. 14 (Mozart), Spring by Wolfgang Amadeus Mozart
- String Quartet No. 14 (Schubert), Death and the Maiden by Franz Schubert
- String Quartet No. 14 (Shostakovich) by Dmitri Shostakovich
- String Quartet No. 14 (Spohr) by Louis Spohr
- String Quartet No. 14 (Villa-Lobos) by Heitor Villa-Lobos
