= Golden Mountains =

Golden Mountains may refer to:

- Golden Mountains (Sudetes), a mountain range in Eastern Sudetes
- Golden Mountains of Altai, a UNESCO World Heritage Site in Siberia
- Golden Mountains (film), a 1931 Soviet film directed by Sergei Yutkevich
