= The Execution of Stepan Razin =

1964 cantata by Dmitri Shostakovich

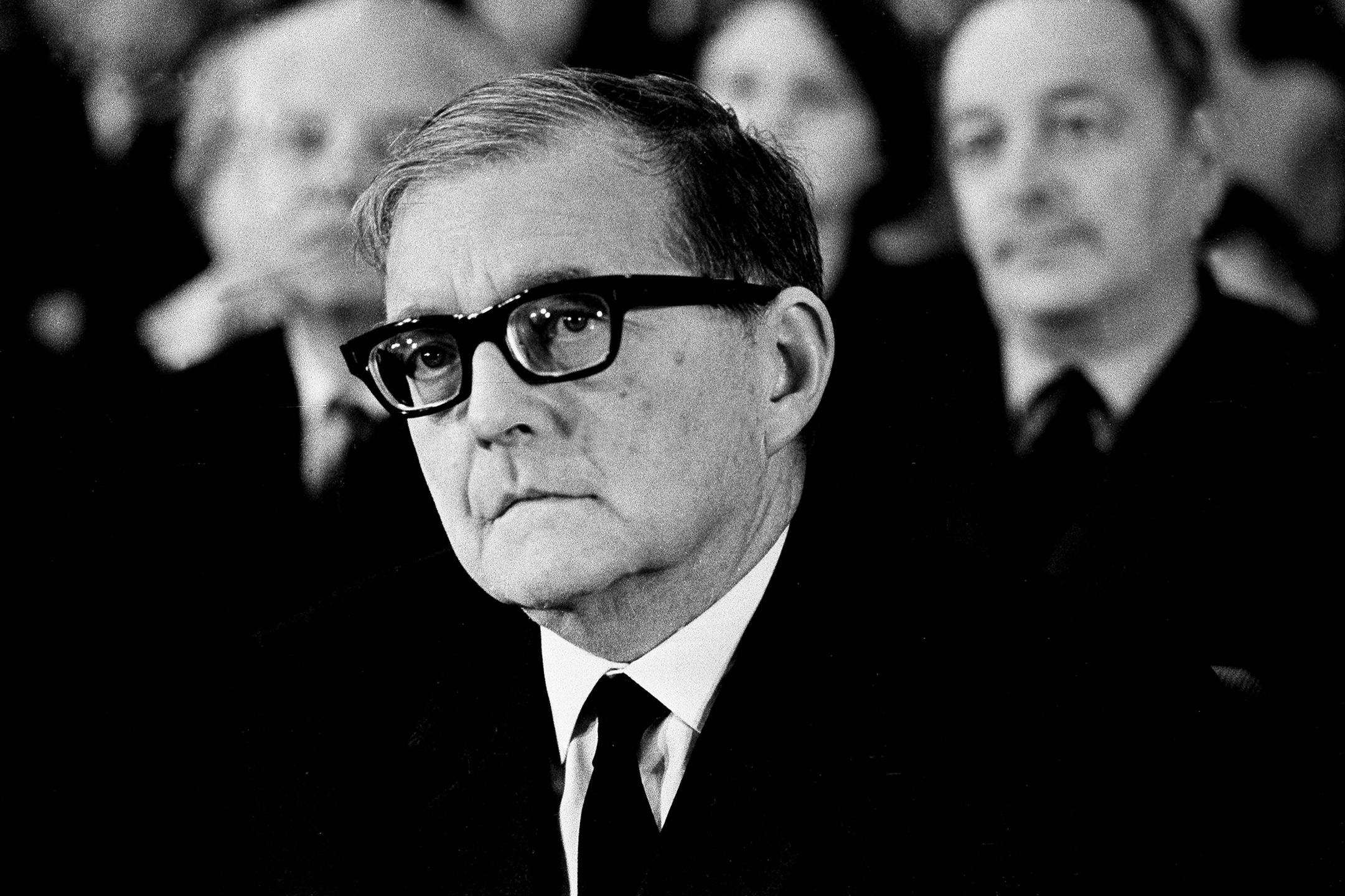
Dmitri Shostakovich in the 1970s

The Execution of Stepan Razin (Russian «Казнь Степана Разина») (Op. 119) is a cantata composed by Dimitri Shostakovich to a libretto by Yevgeny Yevtushenko in 1964. The subject is the execution of Stepan Razin, a Cossack leader who headed a major uprising (1670–71) against the nobility and tsarist bureaucracy in southern Russia.

== Lyrics ==
The opening section of Yevtushenko's poem depicts Razin's fate in front of the uncaring crowd:

КАЗНЬ СТЕНЬКИ РАЗИНА : Как во стольной Москве белокаменной вор по улице бежит с булкой маковой. Не страшит его сегодня самосуд. Не до булок... Стеньку Разина везут! Царь бутылочку мальвазии выдаивает, перед зеркалом свейским прыщ выдавливает, Примеряет новый перстень-изумруд - и на площадь... Стеньку Разина везут!

As the thief runs in Moscow's white-stone streets, with his poppy-seed bun, today's execution does not frighten him. Stenka Razin is led out! The tsar gives out a bottle of wine, squeezes his pimples in front of the mirror, tries on a new emerald ring. And to the square, Stenka Razin is led out!

In the middle section, Razin reflects on his fate: "Fool! Stenka, you die for nothing!" The final section describes the execution itself, in very short, choppy lines: the crowd falls silent, and Razin's head, still living - laughs his triumph over the watching tsar.

== Recordings ==
- Shostakovich: Cantatas — Estonian Concert Choir, ENSO Paavo Järvi Erato 2015.
- The Execution of Stepan Razin — Seattle Symphony Chorale, Seattle Symphony, Gerard Schwarz: Naxos 2006.
- Symphony No. 12 and The Execution of Stepan Razin — Rundfunkchor & Sinfonie-orchester Leipzig, Herbert Kegel: Philips 1992.
- Georgy Sviridov Oratorio Pathetique and Shostakovich The Execution of Stepan Razin — Varna Philharmonic Orchestra and Chorus, Andrey Andreev (cond.) & Assen Vassilev (bass): Koch International Classics 1990.
- Symphony No. 9 and The Execution of Stepan Razin — Moscow State Philharmonic Symphony Orchestra & Republican Russian Choir Capella, Kirill Kondrashin (cond.) & Vitali Gromadsky (bass): Melodiya 1965 (reissued as a CD in 2015 by High Definition Tape Transfers).

== See also ==
- List of compositions by Dmitri Shostakovich
