= String Quartet No. 16 (Shostakovich) =

Unrealized work by Dmitri Shostakovich

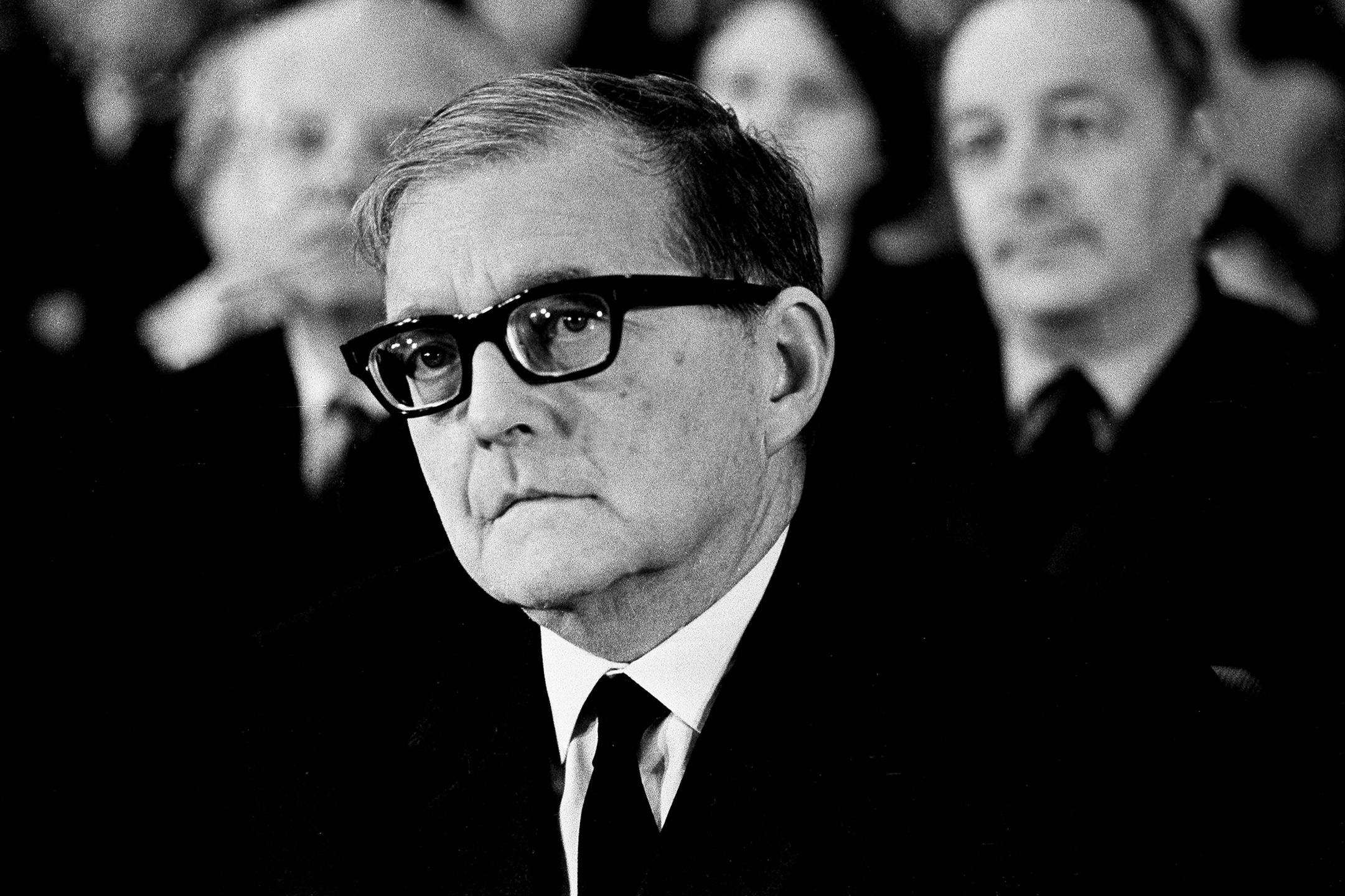
Dmitri Shostakovich in the 1970s

The String Quartet No. 16 in B major is an unrealized musical composition by Dmitri Shostakovich.

== Background ==
On April 11, 1974, the Polish composer Krzysztof Meyer visited Shostakovich at his home in Moscow. In the course of their conversation, Shostakovich played a tape recording of his String Quartet No. 14 for Meyer, who then asked whether any work had been made on the quartet's successor. Shostakovich replied that illness had prevented him from working on the score, but that he envisioned the work as a large, single-movement "Adagio". He then related to Meyer that he had also conceived what would have been the String Quartet No. 16:

And the Sixteenth will be in three movements, with a fugue in the finale, you understand, with a double fugue in the finale. And the second movement will be lyrical, very lyrical...

Shostakovich followed this remark by playing the double fugue's theme for Meyer, who said it "ran through [his] head for a long time". In response to a query from Meyer, Shostakovich confirmed that the quartet would be composed in the key of B major. He made no further comment. On another occasion, Shostakovich told the violinist Dmitri Tsyganov that the String Quartet No. 16 would be dedicated to the new line-up of the Beethoven Quartet. The composer never completed this work.

According to an article by Iain Strachan, had Shostakovich composed his String Quartet No. 16, it would have completed a "mathematical version" of his musical monogram "DSCH". All quartets in major keys based on one of the notes in the monogram would have been square numbers. This theory of Shostakovich's intent is believed to be plausible by the British musicologist, David Fanning.

== Legacy ==
Meyer later adapted Shostakovich's outline for his own quartet, Au-delà d'une absence. "Here I thought, 'How would it be if Shostakovich had composed a Sixteenth String Quartet?'", the composer said of the work. Although it is in Shostakovich's style and adheres to his general plans, the work's musical material is entirely by Meyer.
