= String Quartet No. 4 (Shostakovich) =

1949 string quartet by Dmitri Shostakovich

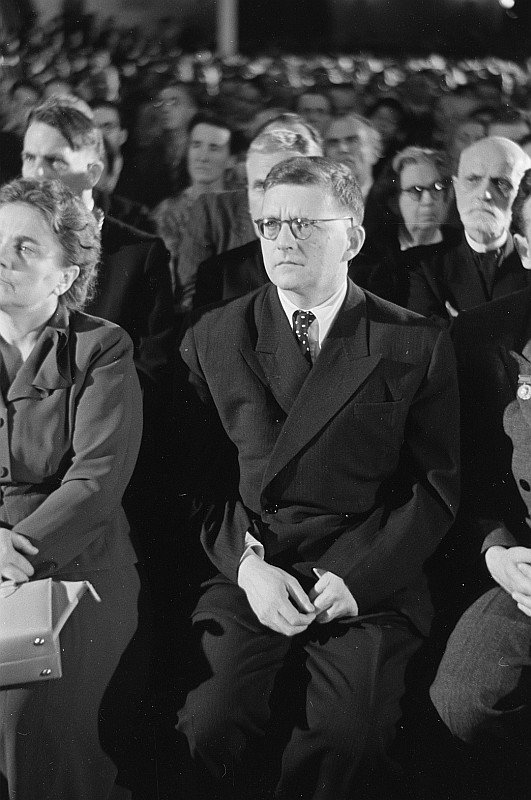
Dmitri Shostakovich in 1950

Dmitri Shostakovich's String Quartet No. 4 in D major, Op. 83, was composed in 1949 and premiered in Moscow on 3 December 1953. It is dedicated to the memory of Pyotr Williams (1902–1947), a painter and set designer who was a close friend of Shostakovich.

It has four movements:

1. Allegretto
2. Andantino
3. Allegretto (attacca)
4. Allegretto

Playing time is approximately 25 minutes.

The quartet contains a Jewish dance theme.
