= Erwin Dressel =

German composer and pianist

Erwin Dressel (10 June 1909, in Berlin – 17 December 1972, in Berlin) was a German composer and pianist.

Following the success of his incidental music for Shakespeare's Much Ado About Nothing, Dressel wrote many operas for the Deutsche Staatsoper. He also arranged music for the radio, concertized as a pianist and wrote orchestral music, including four symphonies; as well as concertos for various instruments (including one for two saxophones).

== Selected works ==
Opera

- Armer Columbus, opera, Op.23 (1927); libretto by Arthur Zweiniger
- Der Bär, burlesque opera in 1 act; libretto by Robert Wolfgang Schnell
- Der Kuchentanz, tragic opera in 3 acts (1927–1928); libretto by Arthur Zweiniger
- Die Laune des Verliebten, lyric opera in 1 act; libretto by Johann Wolfgang von Goethe
- Der Rosenbusch der Maria, Legend in 4 scenes (1929); libretto by Arthur Zweiniger
- Das Urteil von Zalamea, opera in 3 acts, 6 scenes, Op.50; after Lope de Vega and Arthur Zweiniger
- Die Zwillingsesel, opera in 3 acts; libretto by Arthur Zweiniger

Orchestral

- Abendmusik for chamber orchestra, Op.33
- Balladesker Marsch
- Capriccio ritmico
- Caprice fantastique
- Cassation
- Deutsche Märchen-Suite for chamber orchestra, Op.36
- Französische Ouvertüre
- Heitere Begegnungen
- Ouverture zu einem Märchenspiel, Op.47
- Rondoburleske
- Serenade II in E♭ major for string orchestra
- Symphony in D♭ major

Concertante

- Concerto for alto saxophone and orchestra
- Concerto for oboe, clarinet, bassoon and orchestra
- Concerto for saxophone and orchestra, Op.27
- Duo-Konzert (Double Concerto) for soprano and alto saxophones and chamber orchestra

Chamber music

- Bagatellen (Bagatelles) for saxophone and piano
- Canto variato for cello and piano
- Partita for alto saxophone (or clarinet, or viola) and piano (1965)
- Sonata for alto saxophone and piano, Op.26
- String Quartet (1928)
- Suite for violin and piano
- Trio miniature for clarinet, horn and bassoon

Piano

- Piano Sonata
- Zehn Klavierstücke (10 Piano Pieces)

Vocal

- Von allerlei Tieren ein lustig Musizieren, Song Cycle for voice and piano, Op.39
