= Piano Trio No. 1 (Shostakovich) =

1923 partially lost piano trio by Dmitri Shostakovich

Piano Trio in C minor
- No. 1
- by Dmitri Shostakovich
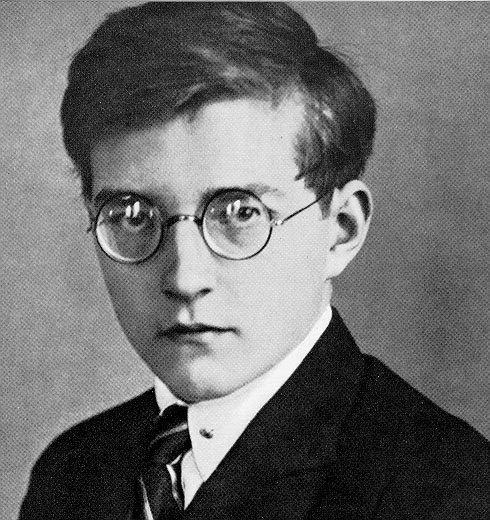
- The composer in 1925
- Other name: Poème
- Key: C minor
- Opus: 8
- Composed: 1923
- Dedication: Tatyana Glivenko

Piano Trio No. 1, Op. 8, in C minor for violin, violoncello and piano is a very early chamber composition by Dmitri Shostakovich. It was performed privately in early 1924, but was not published until the 1980s. Twenty years later, the composer wrote the more well-known Piano Trio No. 2 in E minor, Op. 67.

== History ==
Originally titled Poème, the work was composed in 1923 when the composer was sixteen and had been in the Leningrad Conservatory for three years. By the time the score was being prepared for publication six decades later, the last 22 bars of the piano part had been lost, which were completed by Shostakovich's pupil, Boris Tishchenko.

All of the work's themes are derived from the opening chromatic motive. Its Romanticism is atypical of the composer's mature work. In a letter to the trio's dedicatee, his then girlfriend Tatiana Glivenko, Shostakovich wrote that the second subject had been salvaged from a partially lost Piano Sonata in B minor he had composed three years before. It was first performed privately by the composer and two of his friends, followed by an audition for Nikolai Myaskovsky at the Moscow Conservatory on April 8, 1924. Standard duration is approximately 13 minutes.
