= March of the Soviet Militia =

1970 march by Dmitri Shostakovich

- by Dmitri Shostakovich
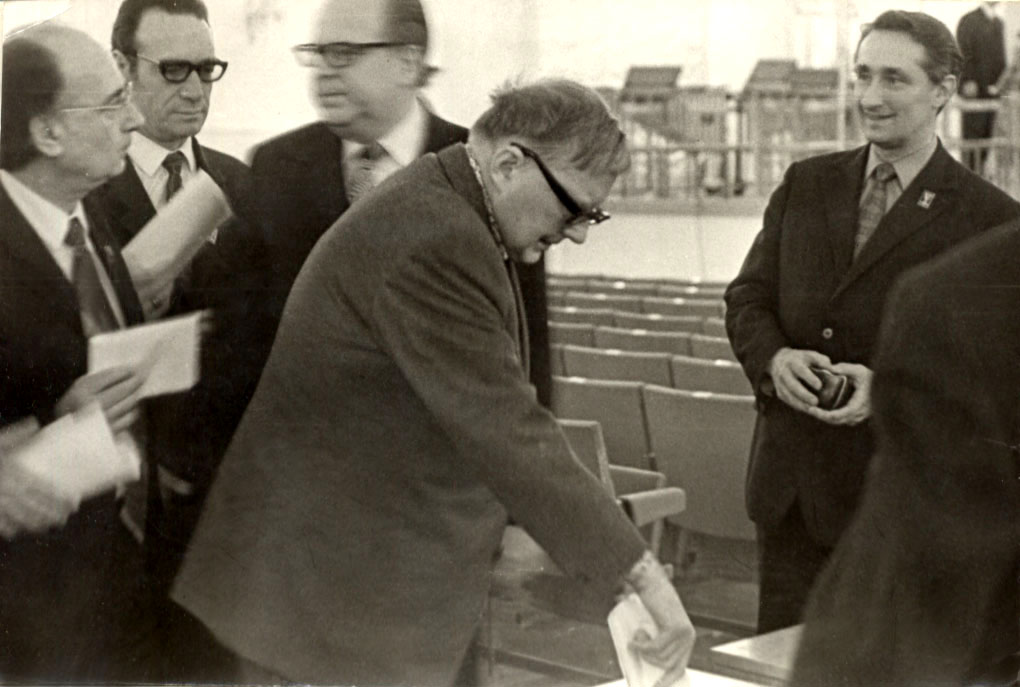
- Shostakovich (center) in 1974 (photograph by Yuri Shcherbinin)
- Opus: 139
- Composed: October 1970
- Dedication: Mikhail Zoshchenko (disputed)
- Published: 1972
- Publisher: Sovietsky kompozitor Muzika; DSCH Publishers
- Duration: 1 1/2–2 minutes
- Scoring: Military band

Premiere
- Date: November 10, 1970
- Location: House of the Unions; Moscow, Russian SFSR
- Conductor: Nikolai Zolotaryov
- Performers: Exemplary Orchestra of the Office of the Kremlin Commandant

The "March of the Soviet Militia" (Russian: Марш советской милиции, romanized: Marsh sovietskoy militsii), Op. 139 is a march for military band composed in 1970 by Dmitri Shostakovich.

== History ==
Shostakovich composed the "March of the Soviet Militia" in October 1970 at the request of Nikolai Shchelokov, then Minister of Internal Affairs of the USSR. Sources disagree about whether the work bears a dedication. According to Maxim Shostakovich, Pauline Fairclough, and Derek C. Hulme, Shostakovich dedicated the work to his deceased friend, writer and satirist Mikhail Zoshchenko. The editor for the new collected works edition of the score, however, states that the score has no dedication.

The work was published by Sovietsky kompozitor, Muzika, and DSCH Publishers in 1972, 1978, and 2006 respectively. It is Shostakovich's final ceremonial work for the Soviet government.

== Music ==
The tempo for "March of the Soviet Militia" is marked "Allegretto." The band consists of the following instruments:

Woodwinds
1 flute
3 clarinets
Brass
3 French horns
2 cornets
2 trumpets
2 saxhorns
2 tenor saxhorns
2 baritone saxhorns
1 trombone
2 double-bass trombones

Percussion
timpani
triangle
snare drum
cymbals
bass drum

A typical performance takes approximately 1 1/2–2 minutes.

== Premiere and reception ==
The "March of the Soviet Militia" was premiered at the House of the Unions in Moscow on November 10, 1970. It was the featured work at an evening ceremony celebrating Soviet Militia Day. The work was premiered by the Exemplary Orchestra of the Office of the Kremlin Commandant conducted by Nikolai Zolotaryov; they also made its first recording in 1971 for Melodiya. It won first prize at the All-Union Competition for the Best Literary, Artistic, and Musical Work About Internal Affairs Staff.

Shostakovich biographer and researcher Levon Akopyan listed "March of the Soviet Militia" as one of the composer's "manifestations of conformity" about which it was "better not to remember."

== Sources ==
- Akopyan, Levon (2018). Феномен Дмитрия Шостаковича (in Russian). Saint Petersburg: Издательство Русской христианской гуманитарной академии. ISBN 978-5-88812-851-0.
- Fairclough, Pauline (2008). "Slava! The 'official compositions'". In Fairclough, Pauline; Fanning, David (eds.). The Cambridge Companion to Shostakovich. Cambridge University Press. ISBN 978-0-521-60315-7.
- Fay, Laurel (2000). Shostakovich: A Life. Oxford University Press. ISBN 0-19-513438-9.
- Hulme, Derek C. (2010). Dmitri Shostakovich: The First Hundred Years and Beyond. Scarecrow Press. ISBN 9780810872646.
- Khentova, Sofia (1985). Шостакович. Жизнь и творчество, Т. 2 (in Russian). Moscow: Советский композитор.
