= Quartet Movement in E-flat major (Shostakovich) =

Incomplete string quartet by Dmitri Shostakovich

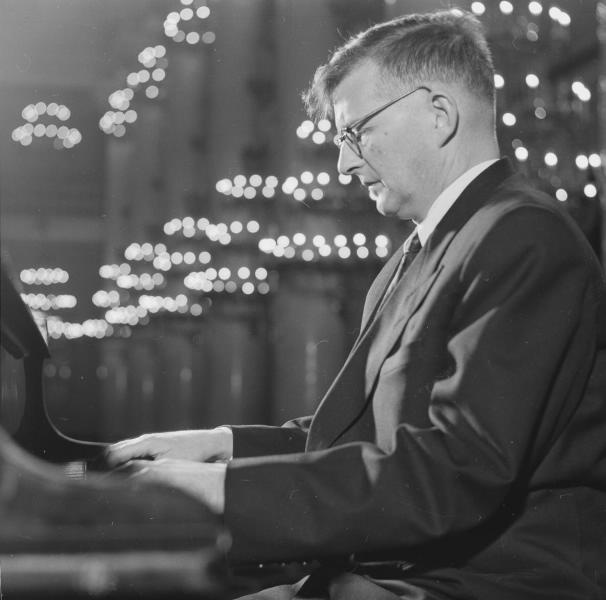
Dmitri Shostakovich playing the piano in the 1950s

The Quartet Movement in E♭ major, also known as the Unfinished Quartet, is the first movement of a projected string quartet in E♭ major by Dmitri Shostakovich, rediscovered in 2003.

== Background ==
Shostakovich's Ninth String Quartet had a difficult creation process, with at least one completed version being destroyed by the composer in 1961, as described by Elizabeth Wilson in her biography Shostakovich: A Life Remembered, "Shostakovich finished the first version of the Ninth Quartet in the autumn of 1961. In a fit of depression, or, to quote his own words, 'in an attack of healthy self-criticism, I burnt it in the stove. This is the second such case in my creative practice. I once did a similar trick of burning my manuscripts, in 1926.'"

Until 2003 it was believed that nothing had survived of the earlier version(s). In that year, musicologists Olga Digonskaya and Olga Dombrovskaya found a manuscript entitled "Quartet No. 9/I DShostakovich/op.113' Key Es-dur, tempo Allegretto". (Note: Opus 113 was later assigned to the Thirteenth Symphony.) which comprised both a complete rough draft of a string quartet movement and a partially completed fair score of the same movement.

== Performance history ==
In early 2005, Roman Ledenyov created a performing version from the rough draft, which the Borodin Quartet premiered on January 15, 2005.

In 2006 the Alexander String Quartet recorded the movement for CD.

As part their 20th anniversary concert series entitled the Fragments Project the Brentano String Quartet commissioned composer Stephen Hartke to write a companion piece to the movement. The piece entitled "From The Fifth Book" was completed in 2011.

== Structure ==
The composition consists of a single movement marked Allegretto and lasts around seven to eight minutes in performance.
