= Suite on Finnish Themes =

1939 vocal suite by Dmitri Shostakovich

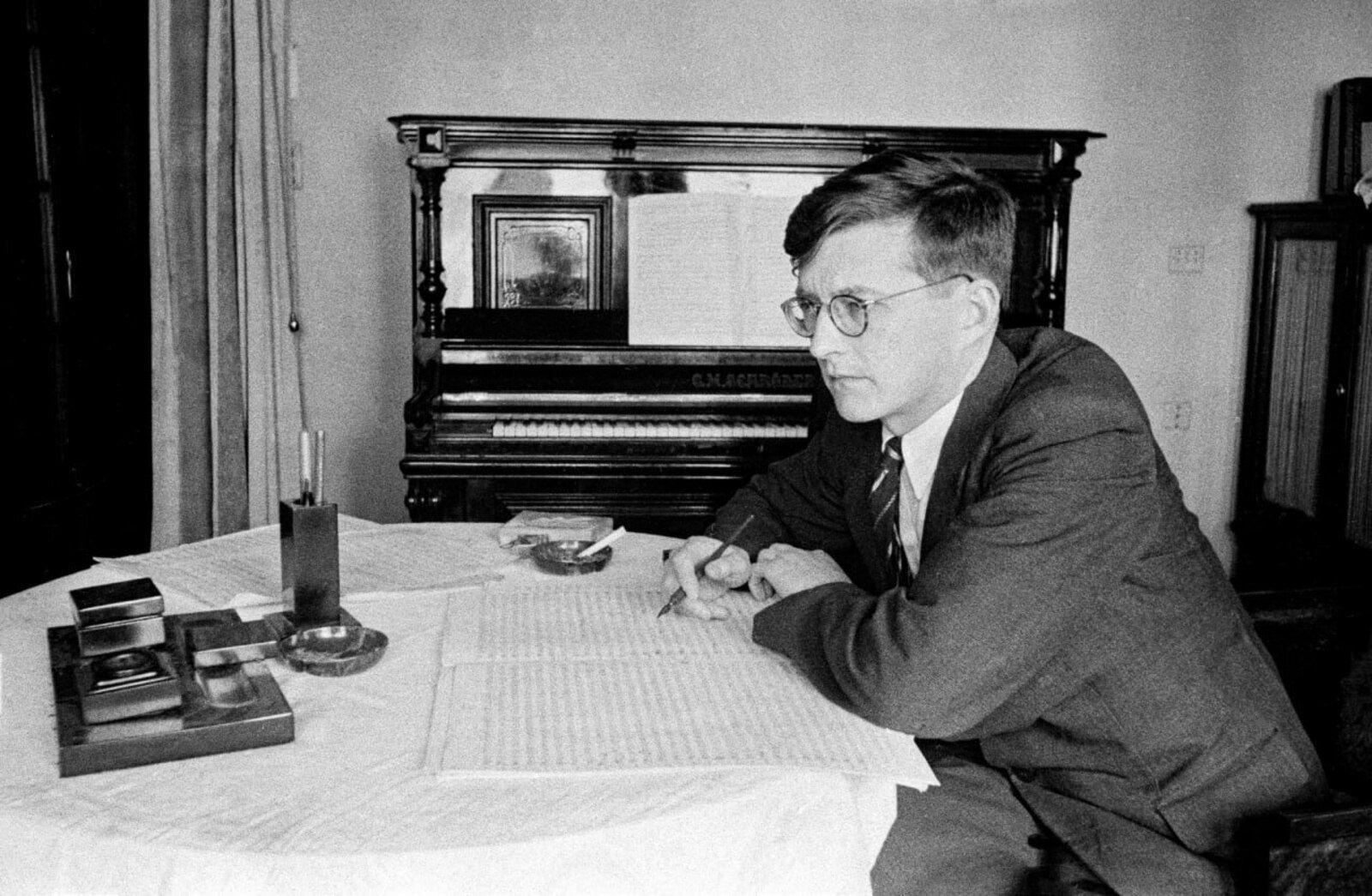
Dmitri Shostakovich in 1940

The Suite on Finnish Themes (Russian: Сюита на финские темы) or Seven Arrangements of Finnish Folk Songs (Семь обработок финских народных песен) is a suite composed in 1939 for soloists (soprano and tenor) and chamber ensemble in seven movements by the Russian composer Dmitri Shostakovich (1906–75). The composer later disowned the work, and the suite does not have an opus number.

== History ==
In 1939, before the Soviet forces were to invade Finland, the Party Secretary of Leningrad Andrei Zhdanov commissioned a celebratory piece from Shostakovich, a theme to be performed as the marching bands of the Red Army would be parading through the Finnish capital Helsinki. Shostakovich finished composing on 3 December 1939, as the Red Army was advancing in the Finnish front and the puppet regime Finnish Democratic Republic was founded three days earlier.

The only early historical source of the suite is a letter which Shostakovich sent his friend Levon Atovmyan on 5 December 1939. In the letter, Shostakovich explains that he was unable to come to Moscow as the Leningrad military district had commissioned a suite of Finnish folk songs. The deadline was on 2 December, but he had completed it on 3 December.

The exact commission date is uncertain, but according to the Finnish historian Ohto Manninen, it was probably commissioned on 25 November, though not earlier than 23 November. An earlier date is not likely as Shostakovich sent a telegram on 22 November to Atovmyan where Shostakovich was certain he would arrive in Moscow. The war began on 30 November 1939.

However, the Winter War was a bitter experience for the Red Army. The Red Army never entered Helsinki, and Shostakovich would never lay claim to the authorship of this work. It was not performed until 2001.

The Ostrobothnian Chamber Orchestra recorded the suite for BIS in 2002.

== Movements ==
The suite has seven movements:

1. Energico (orchestral)
2. Taivas on sininen ja valkoinen (The Sky is Blue and White)
3. Lento non troppo (orchestral)
4. Tämän kylän tytöt ovat tilulilulei (The Girls of this Village)
5. Mansikka on punainen marja (The Strawberry is a Red Berry)
6. Jos mie saisin jouten olla (If I Could be at leisure)
7. Minun kultani kaunis on (My Beloved is Beautiful)
