= Intervision (Shostakovich) =

1971 television score by Dmitri Shostakovich

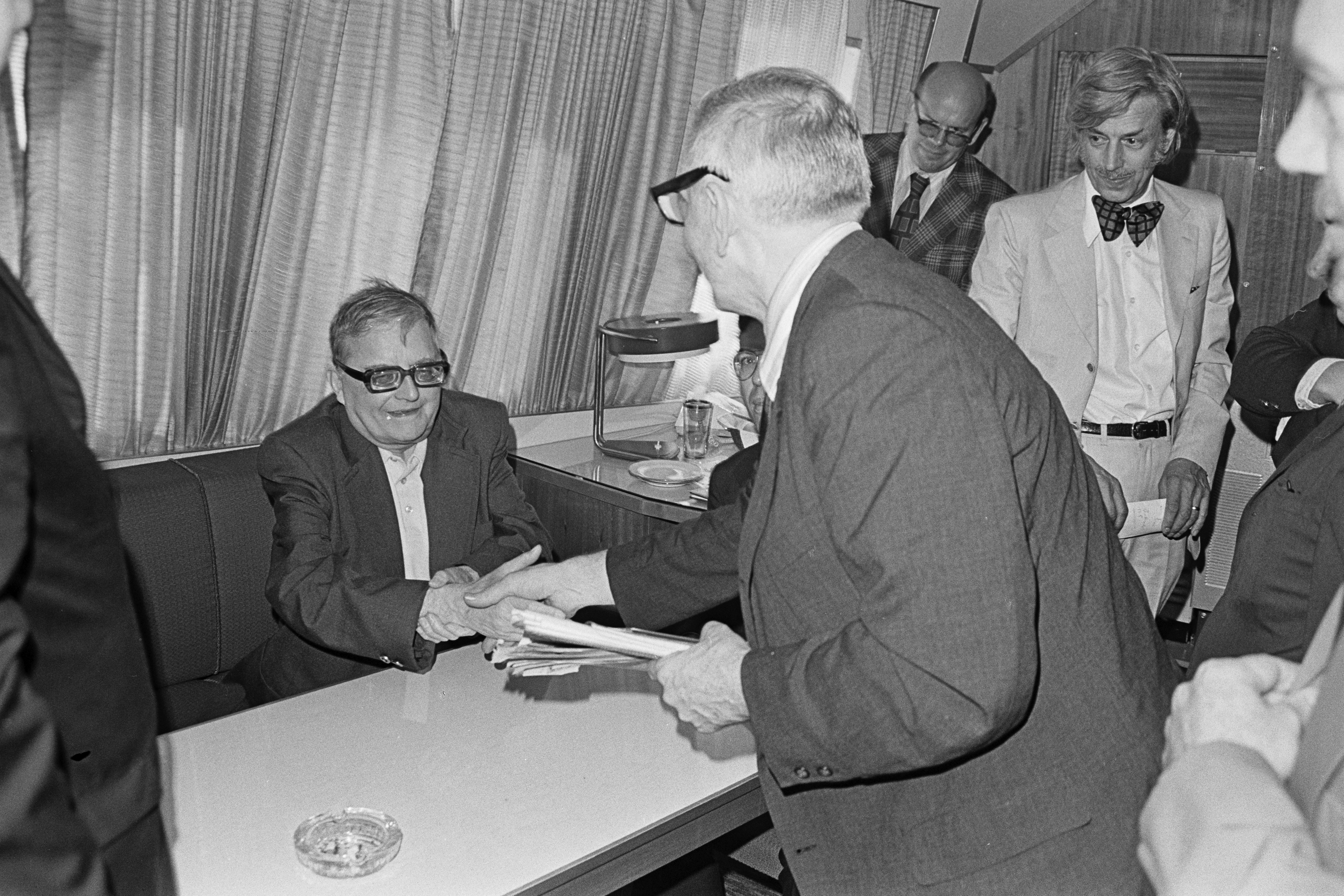
Dmitri Shostakovich (seated) in 1973

Intervision (Russian: Интервидение, romanized: Intervidenie) is a brief orchestral work by Dmitri Shostakovich composed in 1971. It was commissioned by the Intervision Network for use in its news broadcasts.

== Background ==
Intervision was commissioned from Dmitri Shostakovich by the Intervision Network, which broadcast its premiere on March 29, 1971, the day before the 24th Congress of the Communist Party of the Soviet Union. Because Intervision was regularly used to preface broadcasts of foreign news items, it became one of the composer's best known in the final decades of the Soviet Union. According to Ilmar Ivert:

The "Intervision" fanfares, the melody for which was written by Dmitri Shostakovich, are well-known in the socialist commonwealth countries and many other countries in the world. These fanfares bring millions of people to their television screens. Viewers know that they will be followed by the announcement of an important event, an interesting program, or authentic and exhaustive information.

It was first published in 1987 by Muzyka in volume 42 of its collected works edition of Shostakovich's music. It was republished by DSCH Publishers in 2019 in volume 36 of its new complete works edition.

== Music ==
Intervision consists of six measures of music with the tempo marking "Moderato maestoso ( = 96)". It is scored for:

Woodwinds
Piccolo
2 Flutes
3 Oboes
3 Clarinets
2 Bassoons
Contrabassoon

Brass
4 French horns
3 Trumpets
3 Trombones
Tuba

Percussion

Timpani
Triangle
Cymbals

Strings
1st Violins
2nd Violins
Violas
Cellos
Double basses

=== Manuscript ===
Shostakovich's sketch for Intervision has been preserved in good condition, with only slight darkening of its paper occurring in the intervening decades. It is notated with dark blue ink on 12-staff music paper. At the bottom of the sheet are two inscriptions by unknown hands: "Intervision fanfares" light blue ink and "rough draft" in red ink. There is no date or location of composition indicated. The sketch version, consisting of ten measures, is slightly longer than the final. In addition, the melody and rhythm of the first three measures are different in the sketch.

The autograph score, which contained portions of Shostakovich's transcription for voices and piano of his Symphony No. 14, was gifted by the composer to Boris Parsadanian. The manuscript is currently held in the Juilliard Manuscript Collection.
