= Novorossiysk Chimes =

Orchestral work by Dmitri Shostakovich

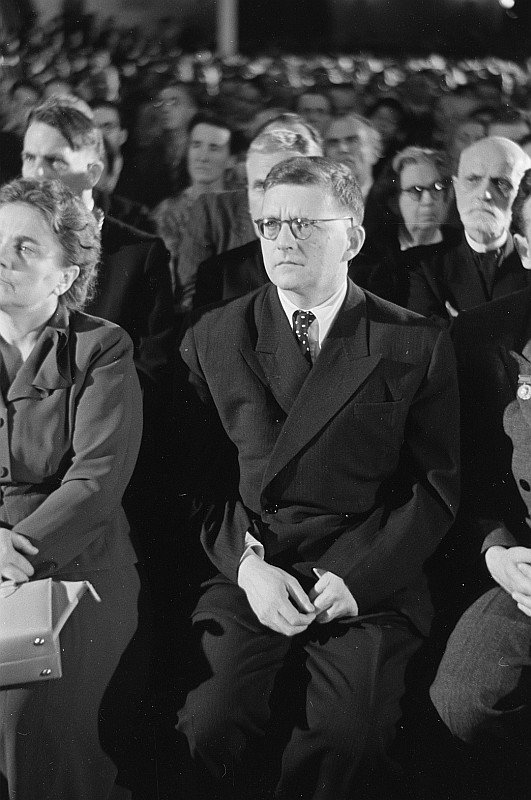
Dmitri Shostakovich in 1950

Novorossiysk Chimes (also known as The Flame of Eternal Glory or The Fire of Eternal Glory), Op. 111b, was written by Dmitri Shostakovich in 1960 for the war memorial in the city of Novorossiysk. The piece consists, mainly, of material Shostakovich had originally written in 1943 as an entry in a contest to compose a new national anthem for the U.S.S.R.

Novorossiysk Chimes has been playing nonstop at Heroes Square in Novorossiysk since its opening on September 27, 1960. The song's opening phrases have also been used as introductory music for Moscow Radio's late-night news program CKACWH.

== Instrumentation ==
The score calls for two flutes, one piccolo, two oboes, one English horn, three clarinets in B♭, two bassoons; four horns in F, three trumpets in B♭, two trombones, one bass trombone, one tuba; a percussion section with timpani, snare drum, cymbals, triangle; one celesta; and strings.
