= The Twelve Chairs (Shostakovich) =

1939 unfinished operetta by Dmitri Shostakovich

The Twelve Chairs (Russian: Двенадцать стульев, romanized: Dvenadtsat stulyev) is an unfinished operetta by Dmitri Shostakovich based on the 1928 novel The Twelve Chairs by Ilf and Petrov. Shostakovich announced the work in July 1939, for the Leningrad Theater of Musical Comedy. In October that year, he assumed he would be finished with the operetta at the end of that year, but he never finished the work.

The music was written in 1939, along with work on an unfinished Lenin Symphony and seven other operas, which included an opera about the Baltic Fleet in 1917, an unidentified Civil War opera, operatic adaptations of his music for Volochayevka Days, and The Great Citizen, the novels A Hero of Our Time and Masquerade by Lermontov, How the Steel Was Tempered by Ostrovsky, and incidental music for Romain Rolland's play Liluli. Only a little music from The Twelve Chairs has survived from this period of false starts.
