= Come Lasses and Lads =

17th-century British song

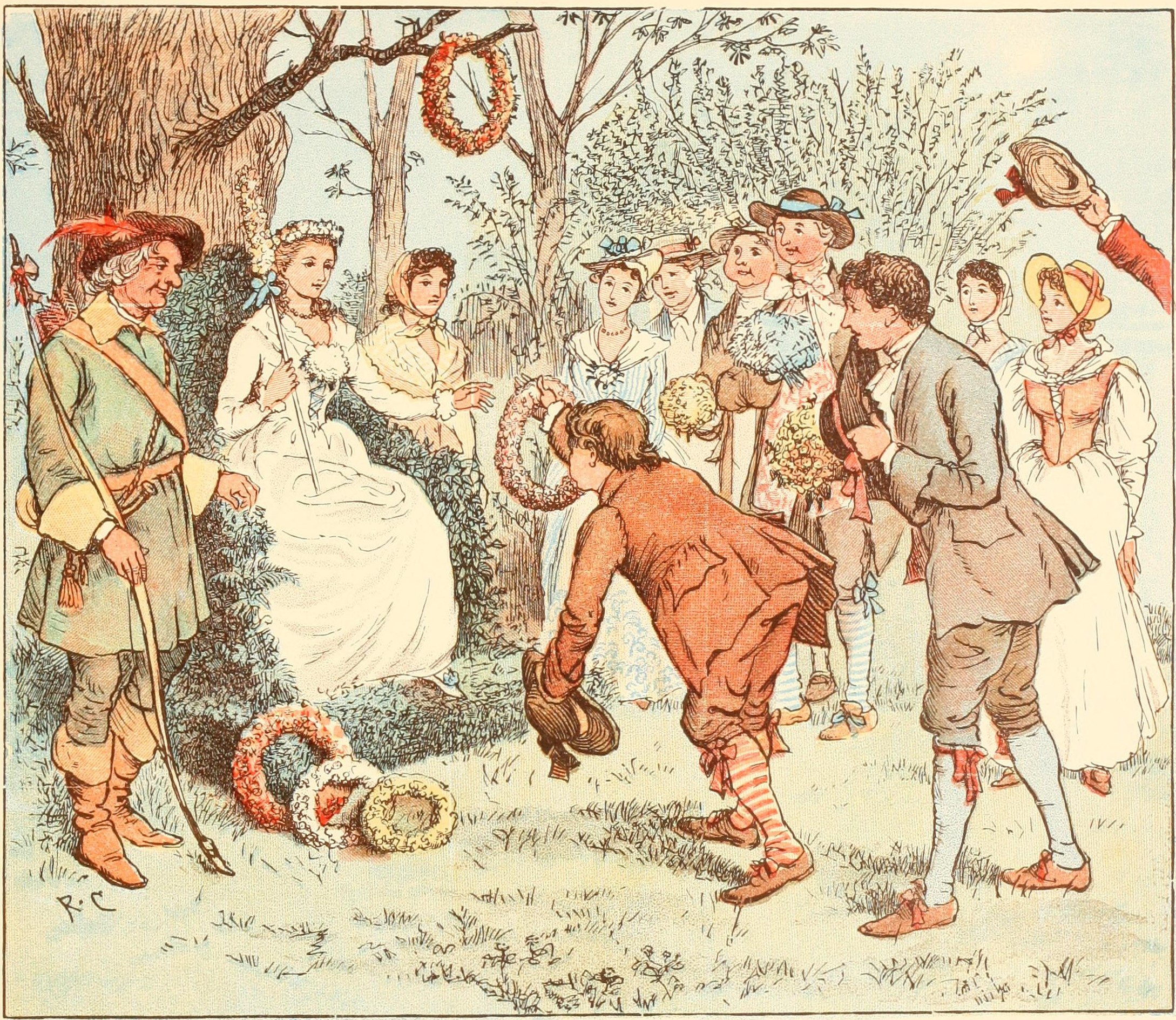
From Randolph Caldecott children's book Come Lasses and Lads, originally published in 1884

Come Lasses and Lads is a traditional 17th-century British song in 6/8 time signature with a "bright swing" mood, performed during festive dances around the Maypole. Folk words and music. There are many variants of the text, diverging in third-party details.

== Text ==
One of the lyrics of the song:

Come, Lasses and Lads, take leave of your Dads,
And away to the Maypole hie;
For ev'ry fair has a sweetheart there,
And the fiddler's standing by.
Then Willie shall dance with Jane,
And Johnny has got his Joan,
And every maid shall trip it, trip it
Trip it up and down.
(Repeat last two lines)

Let's start, says Dick, Aye aye, says Nick
And I prithee, fiddler, play
Agreed, says Hugh, and so says Sue,
For this is a holiday.
Then every lad did doff
His hat unto his lass,
And every maid did curtsey, curtsey,
Curtsey on the grass.
(Repeat last two lines)

Begin, says Matt, Aye aye, says Nat
We'll lead up Packington's Pound
No, no, says Nolly, and so says Dolly
We'll first have Sellenger's Round
Then every man began
To foot it round about
And every girl did step it, step it
Step it in and out.
(Repeat last two lines)

You're out, says Dick, Not I, says Nick
'Twas the fiddler play'd it wrong
'Tis true, says Hugh, and so says Sue
And so says every one
The fiddler then began
To play the tune again
And every maid did jig it, jig it
Jig it to the men.
(Repeat last two lines)

Let's kiss, says Jan, Aye aye, says Nan
And so says every she
How many says Matt, Why three, says Nat
For that is a maiden's fee
The men, instead of three
Did give them half a score
And the maids in kindness, kindness, kindness
Give 'em as many more.
(Repeat last two lines)

Well there they did stay for the whole of the day
And they tired the fiddler quite
With dancing and play, without any pay
From morning until night.
They told the fiddler then
That they'd pay him for his play
And each a twopence, twopence, twopence
Give him, and went away.
(Repeat last two lines)

Good night, says Harry, Good night, says Mary
Good night, says Dolly to John
Good night,' says Sue to her sweetheart Hugh
Good night, says everyone
Some walked, and some did run
Some loitered on the way
And they bound themselves with kisses twelve
To meet next holiday.
(Repeat last two lines)

== Fiction ==
Captain Alexander Smollett in Robert Louis Stevenson's Treasure Island (chapter XХ) whistles the tune of "Come Lasses and Lads".

In Hall Caine's novel The Christian, it is Glory's favorite song.

== Notable artists ==
- David Keith Jones.
- USSR Ministry of Culture Symphony Orchestra conducted by Dmitry Shostakovich.
