= The Big Lightning =

1932 unfinished opera by Dmitri Shostakovich

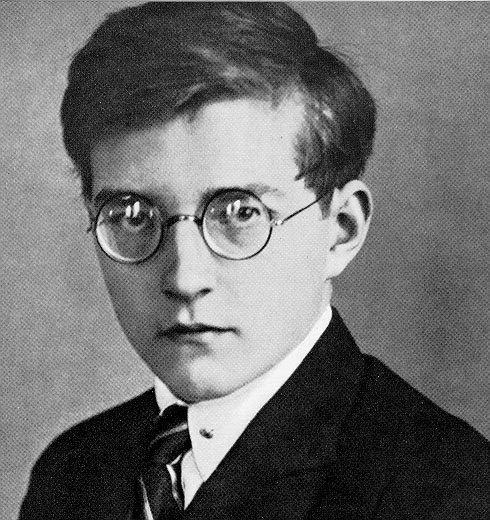
Dmitri Shostakovich in 1925

The Big Lightning (also sometimes The Great Lightning, Russian: Большая молния, Bolshaya molniya) is an unfinished opera sketched in 1932 by Dmitri Shostakovich. The manuscript was found by Olga Digonskaya. Some of the musical material was borrowed from the earlier composition, Hypothetically Murdered, Op. 31. The music for the Big Lightning was eventually scrapped and reworked into Orango, because of his lack of confidence in the libretto. Shostakovich only managed to write the overture and eight following pieces, which last about 17 minutes. The original title may have been Nail in the Powder. The opera contains parodies of Glière's The Red Poppy, and Beethoven's Rage Over a Lost Penny.

The work was commissioned by the Maly Theatre, and the libretto was written Nikolai Aseev, and was about a team of Soviet specialists on a visit to America. It premiered 11 February 1981, Leningrad, Large Philharmonic Hall, conducted by Gennady Rozhdestvensky, who also made the premiere recording.
