= String Quartet No. 13 (Shostakovich) =

1970 string quartet by Dmitri Shostakovich

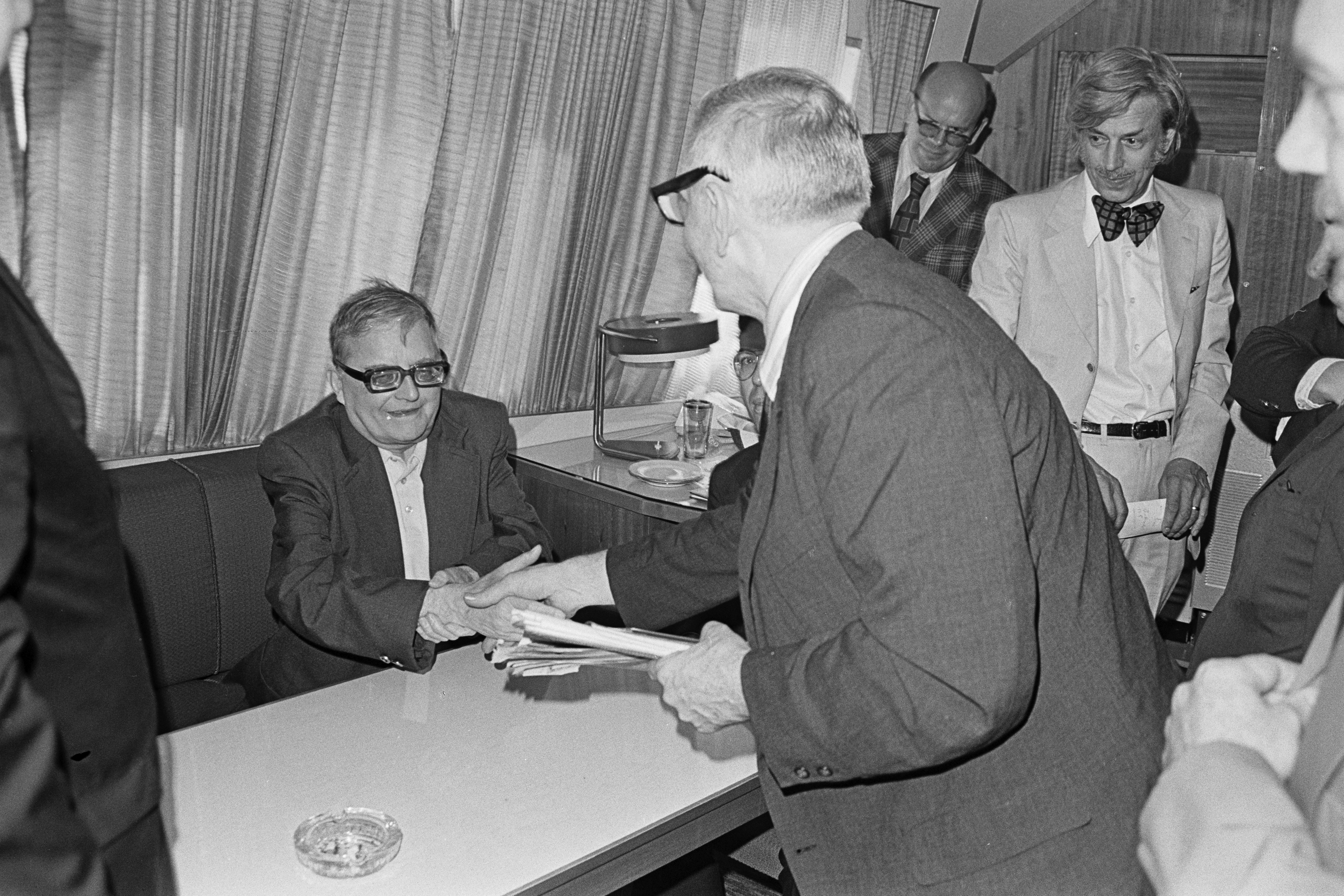
Dmitri Shostakovich (seated) shakes hands with reporter Don McMillan in 1973

Dmitri Shostakovich's String Quartet No. 13 in B♭ minor, Op. 138, was first conceived in 1969, and completed in 1970 as Shostakovich was undergoing treatment at the Russian Ilizarov Scientific Center for Restorative Traumatology and Orthopaedics in Kurgan.

The work consists of one movement, marked Adagio — Doppio movimento — Tempo primo. Playing time is approximately 19 minutes.

The piece is dedicated to Vadim Borisovsky, violist of the Beethoven Quartet, and the viola is accordingly given a prominent role in the piece. The quartet opens with a twelve-tone theme played on the viola, and concludes with a high B♭ held first by the viola, then with the violins in unison until reaching a sforzando. The work also requires the players to tap on the bodies of their instruments with their bows at several points.
