= Seven Romances on Poems by Alexander Blok =

1967 vocal-chamber song cycle by Dmitri Shostakovich

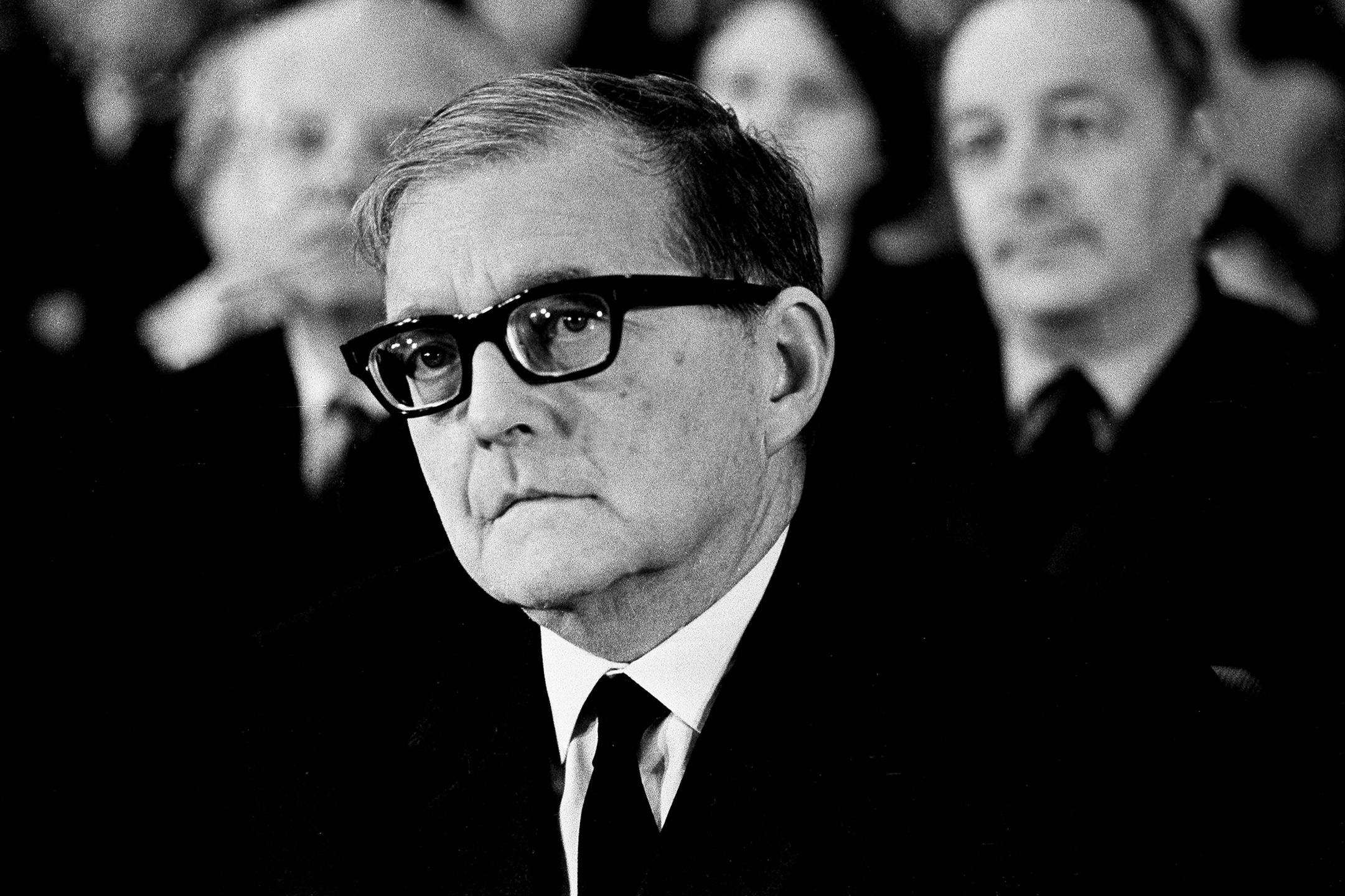
Dmitri Shostakovich in the 1970s

Seven Romances on Poems by Alexander Blok, Op. 127 is a vocal-instrumental song cycle by Dmitri Shostakovich, based on verses by Alexander Blok.

It was written in 1967 for Galina Vishnevskaya. The composition is written for soprano, violoncello, violin, and piano. Vishnevskaya gave the first performance on October 25, 1967 at the Moscow Conservatoire Hall with Mstislav Rostropovich on cello, Mieczysław Weinberg on piano and David Oistrakh on violin.

== Structure ==
The cycle consists of seven parts:

1. Song of Ophelia
2. Gamayun, the Bird of Prophecy
3. We Were Together
4. Gloom Enwraps the Sleeping City
5. The Storm
6. Secret Signs
7. Music

== Recordings ==
ArteMiss Trio. (Alžběta Poláčková-soprano) ArcoDiva CD. UP 0069-2131

Galina Vishnevskaya (soprano), Mstislav Rostropovich (cello), Ulf Hoelscher (violin) and Vasso Devetzi (piano) for EMI

Larissa Rosanoff (soprano), Irina Chkourindina (piano), Oleg Kaskiv (violin) and David Pia (cello) for Claves Records (Switzerland), 2026, CD 3164, EAN/UPC: 7619931316420
