= Katyusha Maslova =

1941 unfinished opera by Dmitri Shostakovich

- Unfinished opera by Dmitri Shostakovich
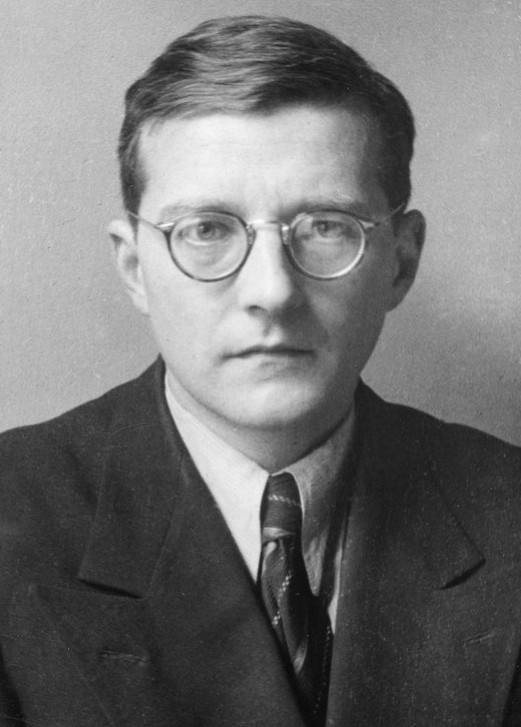
- Dmitri Shostakovich in 1942
- Librettist: Anatoly Mariengof
- Language: Russian
- Based on: Resurrection by Leo Tolstoy

Katyusha Maslova (Russian: Катюша Маслова) is an unfinished opera by Dmitri Shostakovich, with a libretto by Anatoly Mariengof, based on the novel Resurrection by Leo Tolstoy. Shostakovich received a commission from the Kirov Theatre to compose the opera in October 1940, while he was composing music for Grigori Kozintsev's production of King Lear. The first act of the libretto arrived in November, but further work was stalled because of preparations for the premiere of the Piano Quintet and the suicide of Mariengof's son. By the time work resumed in early 1941, Shostakovich had privately decided not to finish the opera.

The libretto was completed in March 1941 and was revised according to recommendations by the Kirov Theatre. In spite of this, it was summarily rejected by Glavrepertkom, which effectively terminated the project. Shostakovich's sketches for the opera were rediscovered in 1979.

== Background ==
In late 1940, while Shostakovich was composing the music for Grigori Kozintsev's production of King Lear, he began considering an operatic treatment of a subject with a female central character that would reveal the "untruth of the world". On October 10, he signed a contract with the Kirov Theatre in Leningrad to compose the opera Katyusha Maslova, based on the novel Resurrection by Leo Tolstoy. A friend, Anatoly Mariengof, was engaged as librettist. In contrast to the librettists of Shostakovich's other unfinished operas, Mariengof was an experienced collaborator with composers. The deadline for the libretto's completion was set for January 1, 1941.

Mariengof delivered the libretto of Act I to Shostakovich on November 23. Musical work was delayed by preparations for the premiere of the Piano Quintet, which required him to be away in Moscow for nearly a month. While there, he learned from colleagues about Franco Alfano's opera Risurrezione, which is also based on Tolstoy's Resurrection. They informed him that it had been successfully revived in the United States, France, Italy, and Chile, and questioned whether it was wise for Shostakovich to set what they considered was an old-fashioned text.

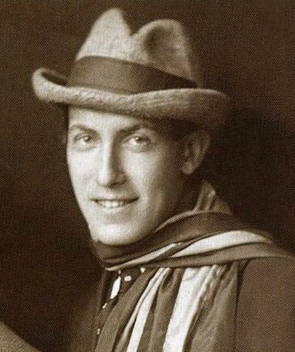
Mariengof in 1919

On January 6, 1941, Mariengof requested an extension of the deadline to April 15, citing the need to work closer with Shostakovich, who had been unable to do so because of his frequent journeys away from home. By this point, Shostakovich had already privately decided against finishing the opera, but explained in a letter to Sergei Prokofiev, who was also interested in composing his own opera on the same subject during this period, that he had not yet informed him:

I won't evidently be writing an opera on the subject of Resurrection. But for now, I request that you keep this circumstance between us. For an entire series of reasons, it is very hard for me now to decline the opera formally. With me it has come about that, as they say, "If a claw is caught, the whole bird is lost." My librettist and great friend, the writer A. B. Mariengof, will be very hurt and offended by my refusal to work with him... In this instance, I can't bring Mariengof grief, since in the first place we are friends, but most important because he is having a very hard time of it: his seventeen-year-old son very recently hanged himself.

On March 8, Shostakovich received Mariengof's completed libretto, which he noted in his diary. At a meeting with the board of directors of the Kirov Theatre, Mariengof said that he had been able to work much closer with Shostakovich, enumerating various instances wherein he tailored the libretto to the benefit of the music. The Kirov board were mostly satisfied with his work, but requested further alterations to the libretto, criticizing what they considered were "crudely naturalistic denouements of several scenes in the second, third, and fourth acts". Shostakovich said that he was satisfied with the libretto, but was preparing himself for "many corrections in the process of composing the music". On May 10, Glavrepertkom telegrammed the Kirov Theatre with their rejection of Mariengof's libretto, effectively ending the project. No explanation for their decision was given. Shostakovich received the news while touring and vacationing in Crimea.

== Libretto ==
Tolstoy's Resurrection, with its religious themes and depiction of the moral rebirth of Dmitri Nekhlyudov, a nobleman, was an unlikely choice to dramatize musically in Soviet times. Mariengof ignored these in favor of focusing on acceptable social issues depicted through Katyusha Maslova, who is made the central character, while relegating Nekhlyudov to the background. His libretto also dispensed with the novel's reliance on flashbacks, which are difficult to realize on stage. Instead, it depicts events occurring in chronological order.

=== Synopsis ===
==== Act I ====
An Easter morning service taking place near the manor of Dmitri Nekhlyudov's aunts. There, Nekhlyudov and Katyusha Maslova had once shared their naïve first love. Night follows and Katyusha Maslova is in bed reading a copy of Eugene Onegin that Nekhlyudov had presented to her. He enters her quarters and manages to seduce her, despite being interrupted by a maid.

==== Act II ====
Katyusha has become a prostitute. Conversation between the brothel's madam and a potential customer reveals that Katyusha became pregnant because of Nekhlyudov, was fired from his aunts' manor as a result, and that her child later died. Katyusha is obliged to entertain a customer, a writer captivated by her past. Later, Katyusha and a chorus of gypsies regale the merchant Ferapont Emilianovich Smelkov with song at a hotel. She inadvertently assists his servant, Simon, in murdering him; after she departs, he burglarizes Smelkov's safe.

==== Act III ====
Katyusha stands trial for the murder. Nekhlyudov reflects on how his seduction of Katyusha ruined her life.

==== Act IV ====
Nekhlyudov visits Katyusha in prison, pleading for forgiveness. She finds camaraderie in political prisoners who will be journeying with her to Siberia. At a camp site along the way, Nekhlyudov learns that Katyusha was pardoned and that she married a fellow prisoner named Simonson. Nekhlyudov vanishes amidst a chorus of prisoners.

== Music ==
Shostakovich never elaborated the music beyond sketches, although the Kirov Theatre's chief conductor, Ariy Pazovsky, said in early 1941 that he had expected to receive a vocal and piano score of the opera to study soon.

These sketches, which amount to several pages, were rediscovered in the archives of the Glinka Museum in Moscow by Sofia Khentova in 1979. The discovery was reported by Pravda on March 17.
