= Golden Mountains (film) =

1931 film

- Directed by: Sergei Yutkevich
- Written by: Lev Arnshtam; Aleksei Chapygin; Andrei Mikhailovsky; Vladimir Nedobrovo; Sergei Yutkevich
- Starring: Boris Poslavsky
- Cinematography: Iosif Martov
- Music by: Dmitri Shostakovich
- Production company: Soyuzkino
- Release date: 6 November 1931
- Running time: 3,585 meters (95 minutes)
- Country: Soviet Union
- Languages: Silent film Russian intertitles

Golden Mountains (Russian: Златые горы, romanized: Zlatye gory) is a 1931 Soviet silent drama film directed by Sergei Yutkevich. A re-edited sound version of the film was released in 1936.

== Plot ==
The film is set in the year 1914. Having received a large military order, the administration of the St. Petersburg metallurgical plant "Krutilov and Son" is attracting new workers. However, a strike is looming at the plant under the influence of a powerful strike movement of the Baku oil workers.

An engineer, who is the son of the factory owner, tries to bribe the former farmer Pyotr and make him the leader of the newly arrived workers. Pyotr takes part in the assassination of the Bolshevik activist-worker Vasili. As a result, the hero is forced to bring home the wounded Bolshevik. Once in the environment of striking workers, Pyotr enters into their ranks and engages in class struggle.

== Cast ==
- Boris Poslavsky - Pyotr, the country boy
- Yuri Korvin-Krukovsky - Industrialist Krutilov
- Boris Fedosyev - Krutilov's son
- Ivan Shtraukh - Vasili, Bolshevik organizer
- Boris Tenin - Windy
- Nikolai Michurin -Nikolai (foreman)
- Natalya Razumova -The Girl
- Konstantin Nazarenko
- Nikoloz Shengelaya -Man from Baku oil fields
- Fyodor Slavsky
- Leonid Kmit
- Stepan Kayukov
- Boris Chirkov
