= String Quartet No. 12 (Shostakovich) =

Composed and premiered in 1968

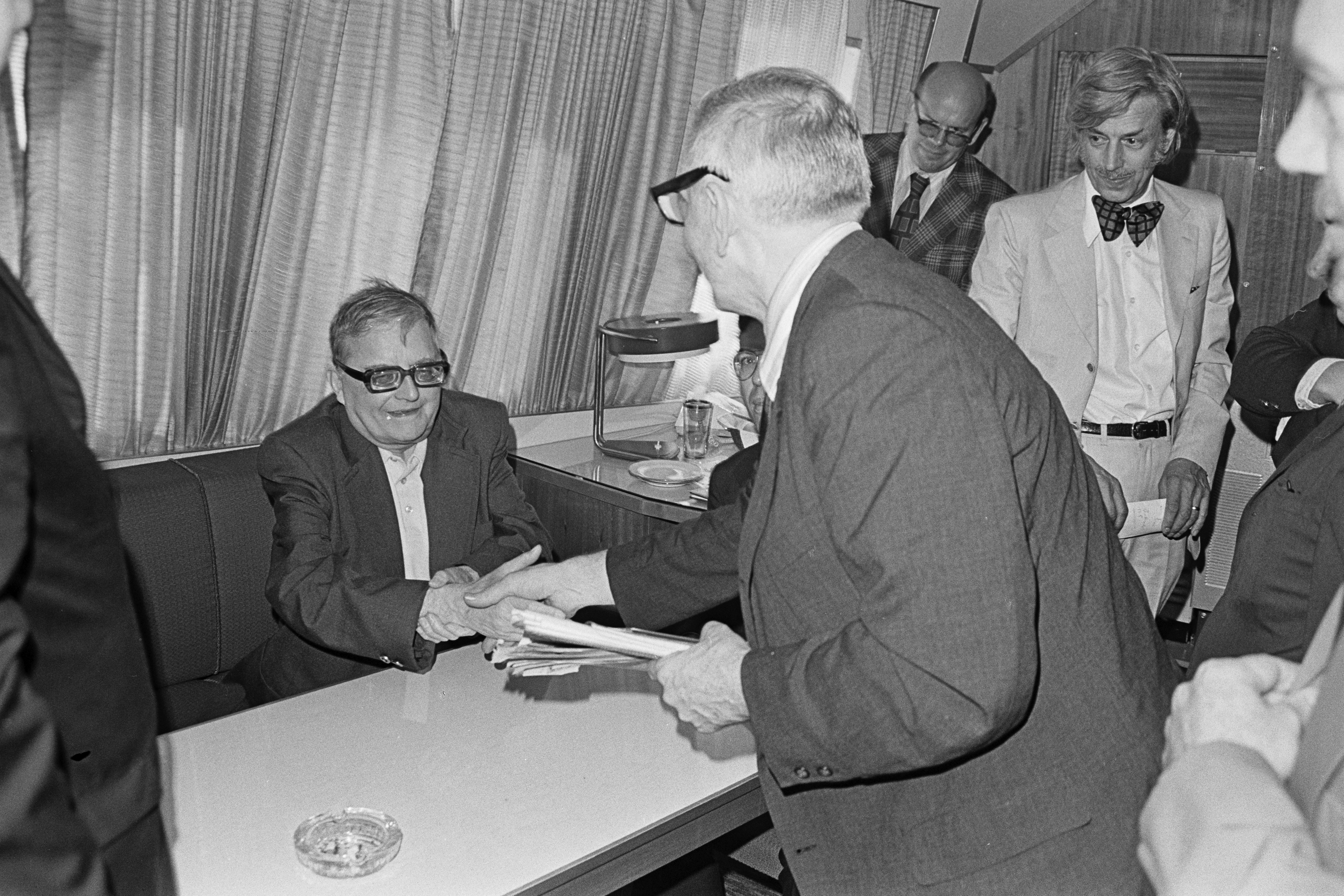
Dmitri Shostakovich (seated) shakes hands with reporter Don McMillan in 1973

Dmitri Shostakovich's String Quartet No. 12 in D♭ major, Op. 133, was composed in 1968. It is dedicated to Dmitri Tsyganov, the first violinist of the Beethoven Quartet, which premiered the work in Moscow on June 14.

== Structure ==
The work lasts approximately 26 minutes and is in two movements:

1. Moderato — Allegretto — Moderato — Allegretto — Moderato
2. Allegretto — Adagio — Moderato — Adagio — Moderato — Allegretto

The piece contains twelve-tone elements, such as the opening in the cello:

Opening of the first movement in the cello outlines a tone row: C F C♭ B♭ D G G♭ E♭ F♭ B A♭ D♭
