= String Quartet No. 14 (Shostakovich) =

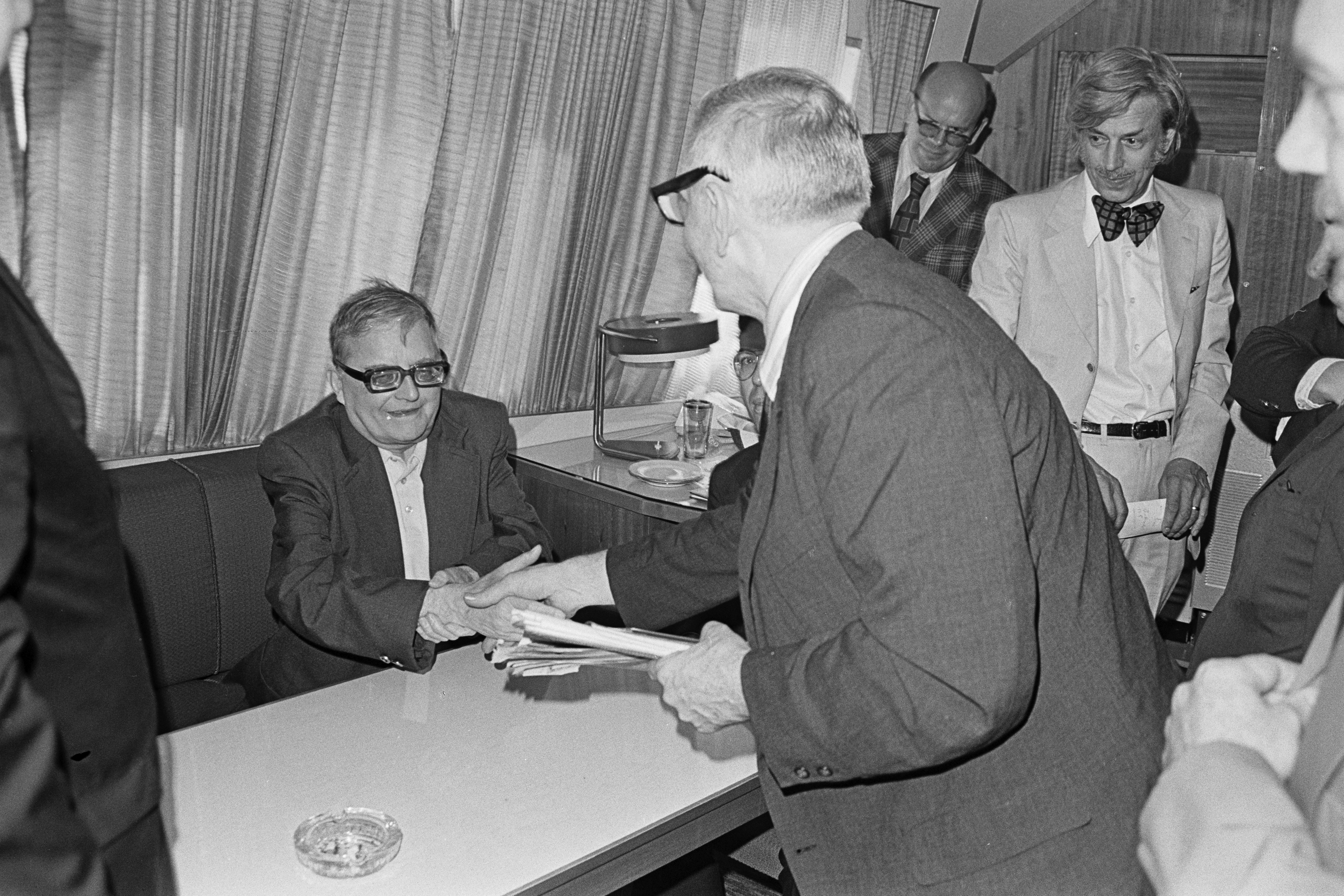
Dmitri Shostakovich (seated) shakes hands with reporter Don McMillan in 1973

Dmitri Shostakovich's String Quartet No. 14 in F♯ major, Op. 142, was composed in 1972–73. It is dedicated to Sergei Shirinsky, the cellist of the Beethoven Quartet, the ensemble that premiered most of Shostakovich's quartets. The first performance was held in Leningrad on November 12, 1973.

It has three movements:

1. Allegretto
2. Adagio (attacca)
3. Allegretto

Playing time is approximately 25 minutes.
