= String Quartet No. 10 (Shostakovich) =

1964 string quartet by Dmitri Shostakovich

- by Dmitri Shostakovich
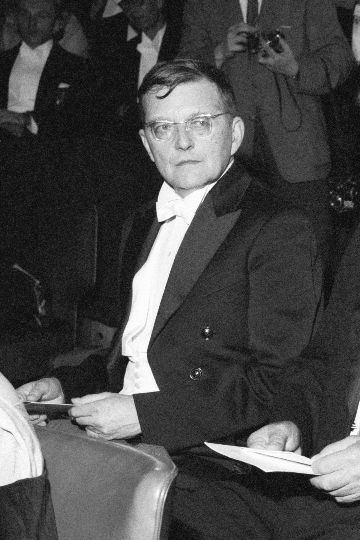
- Key: A♭ major
- Opus: 118
- Form: String Quartet
- Composed: 9–20 July 1964
- Dedication: Mieczysław (Moisei) Weinberg
- Duration: About 22 minutes
- Movements: Four
- Scoring: String Quartet

Premiere
- Date: 1964
- Location: Moscow

Dmitri Shostakovich's String Quartet No. 10 in A♭ major, Op. 118, was composed from 9 to 20 July 1964. It was premiered by the Beethoven Quartet in Moscow and is dedicated to composer Mieczysław (Moisei) Weinberg, a close friend of Shostakovich. It has been described as cultivating the uncertain mood of his earlier Stalin-era quartets, as well as foreshadowing the austerity and emotional distance of his later works. The quartet typified the preference for chamber music over large scale works, such as symphonies, that characterised his late period. According to musicologist Richard Taruskin, this made him the first Russian composer to devote so much time to the string quartet medium.

== Music ==
Shostakovich's musical 'signature', employed motivically throughout his work, including a variation in Movement 1 of the Tenth String Quartet

The work has four movements:

1. Andante
2. Allegretto furioso
3. Adagio (attacca)
4. Allegretto – Andante

Playing time is approximately 22 minutes.

=== I. Andante ===
The first movement is in sonata rondo form and makes use of soft dynamics. Opening with a four-note motif on solo violin, the movement is largely written in E minor, a minor sixth away from the main key of A♭ major. This E minor/A♭ major dialogue recurs throughout the quartet. Themes in both keys are heard separately, then simultaneously, before being recapitulated in A♭.

It also features sul ponticello playing, an extended technique involving use of the upper harmonics of the strings, and makes use of an anapest rhythm which recurs throughout Shostakovich's oeuvre. The movement contains a derivation of Shostakovich's "musical signature", the DSCH motif, a cryptogram of the composer's name using the German lettering system for musical notes. The movement ends morendo, denoting gradually dying away in volume.

A typical performance takes around 5 minutes.

=== II. Allegretto furioso ===
The second movement is in E minor and makes extensive use of the Locrian mode. The emotional indicator 'furioso' is unique in Shostakovich's string quartets. Its beginning, four whole tone steps, references a subject used by Shostakovich in his Fifth Symphony and Eighth String Quartet.

A typical performance takes around 5 minutes.

=== III. Adagio (attacca) ===
The third movement is written in A minor, a semitone away from the tonic A♭ major, although it also employs the A♭ major and E minor tonalities which recur throughout the work. It is written in the passacaglia form, frequently used in Shostakovich's music, and described as an example of the influence of Baroque period composition on his work. The passacaglia theme is developed, played with and without ground bass, and with added bars and beats throughout the movement. It also features a self-quote of the 'hymn motif' of his Fourth Quartet.

A typical performance takes around 7 minutes.

=== IV. Allegretto – Andante ===
The fourth movement is continuous from the third, played with no pause in between. It is written in A♭ major, the tonic key of the work. It also employs D minor, creating dissonance a tritone away from the tonic. It is written in sonata rondo form and makes extensive use of drones and folk song rhythms. In this movement, the themes of each of the preceding three movements are heard again, against the new rondo theme, including the passacaglia theme of the third movement, which is played fortississimo, creating a contrast against the movement's largely muted texture. The movement ends, marked morendo as with the first movement, creating an uncertain finish. The DSCH cryptogram also returns in this movement.

A typical performance takes around 9 minutes.

== Composition ==
The string quartet was dedicated to Polish composer Mieczysław Weinberg, a close friend and pupil of Shostakovich. The composers had a mutually influential relationship, as well as a degree of rivalry, which, in part, motivated the dedication. In 1964, Shostakovich wrote:

[Weinberg] wrote nine quartets and with the last of them overtook me, since at the time I only had eight. I therefore set myself the challenge of catching up and overtaking Weinberg, which I have now done.

The string quartet is written in the traditional four movements, his only quartet composed after his Sixth Quartet, composed in 1956, to do so. This makes it unlike Shostakovich's other quartets at the time, which deviated from tradition by using a variety of movement structures. Its juxtaposition of chromatic and triadic melodies has been noted for its similarity to his Eighth String Quartet, and the melody in the first movement has been said to recall the theme of the first movement of his Fifth Symphony. The structure of the quartet, particularly its combination of calm, relatively quiet introduction and fast, urgent second movement resembles his Tenth Symphony. Its melodies have been described as emblematic of Shostakovich's preference for intervals such as the major and minor third.

Featuring more minims and semibreves than any of the composer's previous work, it anticipates an interest in silence and slow development that characterises the composer's late period. Its extensive use of glissandi, sforzandi, and oscillating semitones has also been described as emblematic of his late style. It employs the rhythm of the "betrayal" motif from Shostakovich's opera, Lady Macbeth. It has also been described as reminiscent in structure of his Third Quartet, for the sequence of the second movement's scherzo, into the third movement's slow passacaglia. Conversely, it foreshadows the austere, subdued mood of Shostakovich's later work, his first quartet since 1956 to not have every movement marked with attacca.

The work was composed over ten days at the Dilijan composers' retreat in Armenia.

Some of Shostakovich's works at the time had been subject to condemnation by the Communist Party. His opera Katerina Izmailova was a 1962 revision of Lady Macbeth of the Mtsensk District, which had been banned by the Communist government in 1936. Because of this controversy, it premiered with no publicity. Similarly, his Thirteenth Symphony was censored for its sympathy to the Jewish survivors of the Babi Yar massacres. Ian MacDonald wrote that an attitude of "disgust" to this reception shaped the "puritanical fury" found in the Tenth String Quartet. The formal choice itself to increasingly compose string quartets over symphonies has been used to support this reading of his work, due to the fact that the string quartet and other chamber forms do not appear on the official list of Soviet genres.

== Reception ==
Its anxious mood has been linked to Shostakovich's declining physical health at the time of composition. Its sparseness has also been suggested to in part result from his health issues and a consequent inability to handwrite complex lines.

Approaches which view the work through the lens of Shostakovich's health or relationship to the government have been described as reductive, such as by critic Thomas May, who wrote that this criticism "tends to obscure the musical and artistic experience" and does not account for the "profound sense of ambivalence" the work contains in spite of its aggressive moments. The quartet has also been interpreted as a representation of the struggle between evil, represented by the theme of the second furioso movement, and human emotions. In this interpretation, the lack of this theme in the fourth movement, where all the other themes are restated, symbolises the possibility of overcoming evil. This interpretation has, however, also been criticised as reductive. The quartet's similarity in structure and melodies to other Shostakovich works has led some critics to describe it as a relatively insignificant composition, such as Ian MacDonald, who wrote in The New Shostakovich that it lacks "the depth or breadth of [its] finest predecessors".

Other critics are more positive, such as Richard Taruskin, who described MacDonald's book as a 'travesty', and suggesting that his dismissal of the Tenth Quartet results from a flawed, overly biographical approach to the composer. Additionally, Judith Kuhn wrote that the quartet's second movement is 'perhaps the most successful and exciting of the composer’s attempts to use the string quartet to depict large-scale conflict'.

== Influence ==
The work was arranged for string orchestra by Rudolf Barshai in his Chamber Symphony. Barshai was a friend and colleague of Shostakovich, and frequent conductor of his music, including the premiere of his Fourteenth Symphony. His arrangement is highly faithful to Shostakovich's original, different primarily in its addition of double bass, largely used to emphasise the cello part. Additionally, Anatoli Dmitriev arranged a reduction for piano four hands.

== Performances and recordings ==
The work was premiered by the Beethoven Quartet in Moscow in 1964. Following this, it was premiered in the UK by the Alberni Quartet in 1966. Over twenty recordings of the work have been made, the first by the Weller Quartet in 1965. These also include recordings by ensembles that Shostakovich knew and worked with, such as the Borodin Quartet, the Beethoven Quartet, both of whom have released multiple recordings of the work, and the Fitzwilliam Quartet, who recorded it in 1998. Several recordings have also been made of Rudolf Barshai's arrangement for string orchestra, including by the Kiev Virtuosi, conducted by Dmitry Yablonsky in 2017 and the Dmitri Ensemble, conducted by Graham Ross, in 2015.
