= Andamento =

Musical term of Italian origin

Andamento is an Italian musical term used to refer to a fugue subject of above-average length.

== Definition ==
The term was coined by G.B. Martini in the second volume of his work Esemplare, ossia Saggio fondamentale pratico di contrappunto (1775), which also featured the terms attacco and soggetto to refer to short and average-length fugue themes, respectively. In Martini's definition, a fugue theme of six 4/4 bars could be described as an andamento. The term found limited use outside of Italy, but has been discussed by scholars.

== Examples ==
- The 'Amen' fugue in Handel's Messiah.
- The first fugue subject of Ronald Stevenson's Passacaglia on DSCH.
