= String Quartet No. 5 (Shostakovich) =

Composed in 1952 premiered in 1953

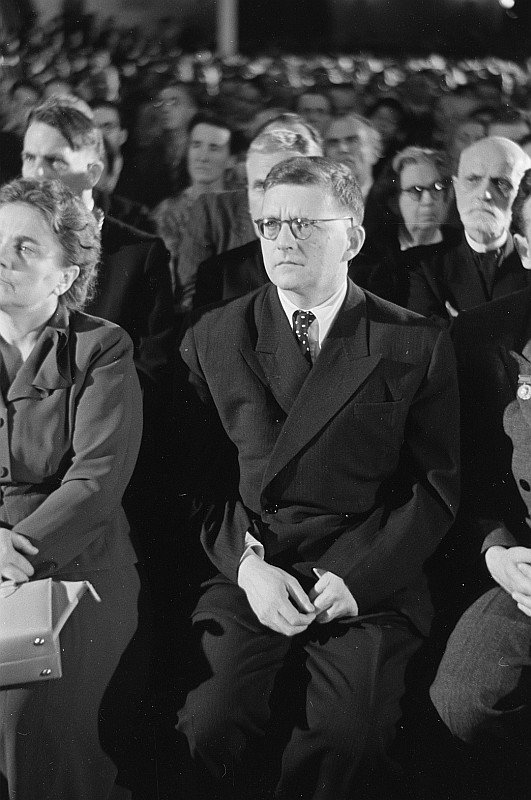
Dmitri Shostakovich in 1950

Dmitri Shostakovich's String Quartet No. 5 in B♭ major, Op. 92, was composed in autumn 1952. It was premiered in Moscow on 13 November 1953 by the Beethoven Quartet, to whom it is dedicated.

== Structure ==
It consists of three movements, performed without a break:

1. Allegro non troppo —
2. Andante — Andantino — Andante — Andantino — Andante —
3. Moderato — Allegretto — Andante

Playing time is approximately 30 minutes.

The work grows from a five-note motif, C–D–E♭–B–C♯, which contains the four pitch-classes of the composer's musical monogram: DSCH (E♭ being Es and B being H in German). This motif appears in a number of his other compositions, including String Quartet No. 8, the first Violin Concerto, and the Symphony No. 10.
