= Piano Trio No. 2 (Shostakovich) =

1944 piano trio by Dmitri Shostakovich

- by Dmitri Shostakovich
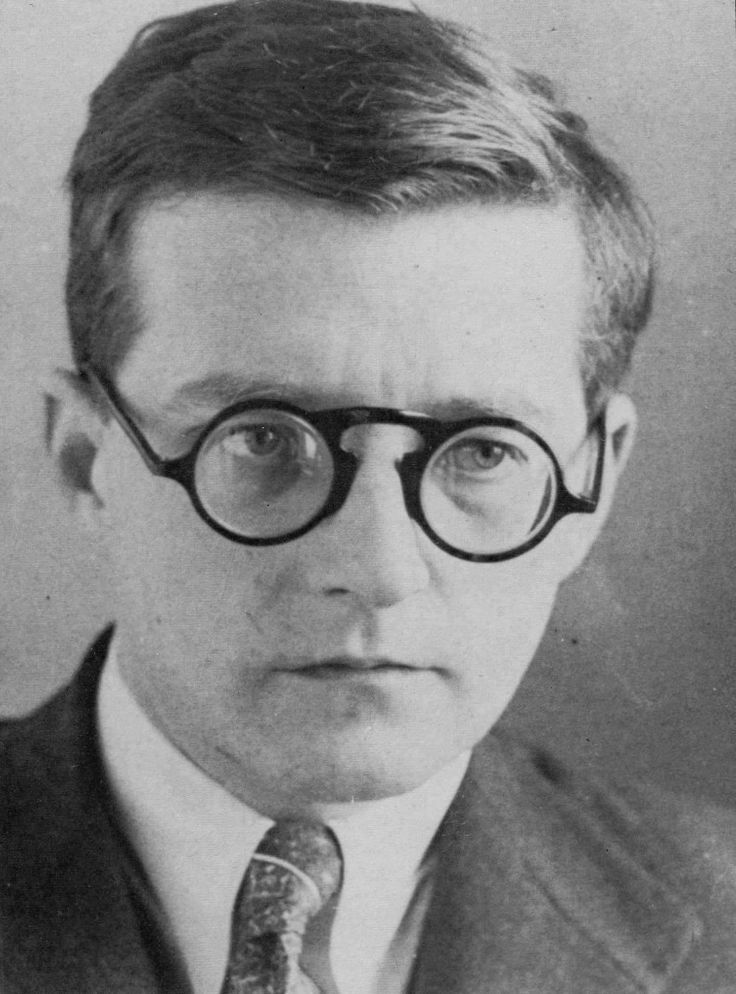
- Shostakovich in 1941
- Key: E minor
- Opus: 67
- Composed: 1943–44
- Dedication: Ivan Sollertinsky
- Performed: 14 November 1944: Leningrad
- Duration: 25 minutes
- Movements: 4

The Piano Trio No. 2 in E minor, Op. 67, is a piece for violin, cello and piano by the Russian composer Dmitri Shostakovich, started in late 1943 and completed in August the following year. It was premiered on 14 November 1944. The piece was dedicated to his close friend Ivan Sollertinsky, whose death in February 1944 affected Shostakovich profoundly.

The piece consists of four movements, with a complete performance running 25 to 27 minutes. The final movement, the "Dance of Death", is notable for its Jewish themes. Erik Levi wrote:

Shostakovich's Trio ... confront[s] the horrors perpetrated by the retreating German army during the last years of the war. In particular, Shostakovich was deeply affected by the stories featured in the Soviet press that SS guards at the death camps of Treblinka and Majdanek had forced Jewish prisoners to dig their own graves and dance upon them. This discovery gave rise to the macabre musical imagery that haunts the Trio’s Finale....

== History ==
Shostakovich began writing the trio during December 1943, having earlier that year in October mentioned beginning work on a piano trio "on Russian folk themes", and having written to Isaac Glikman on 8 December he was working on the trio.

Several days before completing the piece's first movement, Shostakovich's closest friend Ivan Sollertinsky, a Russian polymath and avid musician, died at age 41, having experienced heart pains in the preceding days. Sollertinsky's death affected Shostakovich deeply. He decided to dedicate the trio to his friend's memory. (Note: Shostakovich's dedication of the piece has been compared to the dedications of piano trios of other Russian composers: Sergei Rachmaninoff's dedication of his Trio élégiaque No. 2 to the memory of Tchaikovsky after his death; Tchaikovsky's dedication of his own Piano Trio to the memory of Nikolai Rubinstein; and Anton Arensky's dedication of his First Piano Trio to the memory of cellist Karl Davydov.) Upon hearing of his friend's death he wrote to Sollertinsky's widow that "it is impossible to express in words all the grief that engulfed me on hearing the news about [Sollertinsky's] death", and that "to live without him will be unbearably difficult"; in the following months he suffered from periods of depression and struggled to compose, at one point writing "it seems to me that I will never be able to compose another note again".

He finished writing the work later that year, completing the second movement by 4 August 1944 and the fourth by 13 August. The work received its premiere in Leningrad on 14 November 1944, with the composer at the piano alongside Dmitri Tsyganov and Sergei Shirinsky, members of the Beethoven Quartet, who gave his Second String Quartet its premiere during the same concert.

Two years after premiering the work, in 1946, Shostakovich made the first recording of the work with Tsyganov and Shirinsky. The next year, on 26 May 1947, he made a second recording with David Oistrakh and the Czech cellist Miloš Sádlo at the Prague Festival. (Note: Sádlo first met Shostakovich one year earlier in 1946 during his visit to Russia. Sádlo was excited to record the work with Shostakovich, and later wrote: "My admiration for the man already knew no bounds, but imagine my astonishment when I discovered that he was not only a great composer, but a virtuoso pianist as well!". Oistrakh himself said of the performance: "Without meaning to boast, I believe that this recording of the trio is the best of all that I have heard". Shostakovich, in both recordings, takes a significantly faster tempo in the first movement. According to pianist and Shostakovich researcher Sofia Moshevich, "Shostakovich's playing, on the whole, is truly remarkable in this movement, exhibiting an extremely wide dynamic range and powerful rhythmic drive. His dynamics and inner energy in shaping the culmination in both recordings ... is unforgettable.) In 1946, Shostakovich was also awarded a State Stalin Prize (second grade) for the trio.

== Structure ==
The piece consists of four movements:

1. Andante – Moderato (E minor)
2. Allegro con brio (Note: The tempo is marked "Allegro con brio" in the 1983 Collected Works edition, while some earlier editions have it as "Allegro non troppo".) (F♯ major)
3. Largo (B♭ minor)
4. Allegretto – Adagio (E major → E minor)

=== I. Andante – Moderato ===
The first movement, in E minor, begins with a passage in the cello, which plays exclusively harmonics. It is joined by the violin and then the piano, all three instruments playing in fugue, with the violin entering a 13th below the cello and the piano a 13th below the violin. This slow first section of the movement undergoes development before the music moves into the faster Moderato section, which is in sonata form.

The melodic and rhythmic features of this section's first and second themes are in essence based upon motifs introduced in the opening, and are played alongside a rhythmic "eighth-note pulsation", an accompaniment which returns in the piece's fourth movement. The movement comes to a head in the climactic recapitulation, before the music recedes in the final bars, closing quietly. Throughout the movement, G major, the relative major key, serves, in a conventional manner, as the key of the second theme of the Moderato; however, the keys of B♭ major and B♭ minor, a tritone from the tonic, also play a particularly notable role in the movement's modulations, with there being multiple occurrences of tonicizations from these keys.

According to the conductor and musicologist Michael Mishra, this movement shows Shostakovich in a "neoclassical vein", containing melodies "almost Haydnesque in character", and with the slow introduction to a faster movement being "a nod in the direction of the Classicists".

=== II. Allegro con brio ===
The second movement, in F♯ major, is a scherzo which progresses through dissonant figurations. The movement's trio section in G major, described by one commentator as a "giddy waltz", is less separate from the rest of the movement than is usual for Shostakovich. Sollertinsky's sister considered the movement to be "an amazingly exact portrait" of her brother, whom she said Shostakovich "understood like no one else". It also bears similarities to the scherzo movement from his Piano Quintet.

=== III. Largo ===
The third movement, in B♭ minor, is a passacaglia, based around a repeating eight-bar theme of sustained semibreve chords in the piano, tonally unstable in character. Against this background, the violin and cello, playing in canon, alternate slow melodic lines. The movement ends with an attacca marking, continuing into the next movement without a pause.

In 1975, after Shostakovich's death, this movement was played at his public funeral service held in the Grand Hall of the Moscow Conservatory.

=== IV. Allegretto – Adagio ===
The piece's fourth and final movement begins in E major and transitions to E minor. Staccato repeated notes begin this movement, which introduces a Jewish folk-style melody, and revisits the thematic content of the previous three movements. It ends in an E major chord.

The Jewish melody from this last movement was quoted in Shostakovich's String Quartet No. 8.
