= Ivan Sollertinsky =

Ivan Ivanovich Sollertinsky (3 December 1902 in Vitebsk – 11 February 1944 in Novosibirsk) (Cyrillic: Ива́н Ива́нович Соллерти́нский) was a Soviet polymath. He specialized in fields including linguistics, theatre, literature, history, and philology, but was most known for his work in the musical field as a critic and musicologist. He was a professor at the Leningrad Conservatory, as well as an artistic director of the Leningrad Philharmonic, and a prominent orator. In these capacities, he was an active promoter of Mahler's music in the Soviet Union. Sollertinsky was also interested in ballet and often wrote essays on the subject during the 1930s, along with teaching ballet history at the Leningrad Choreographic Institute. According to contemporaries – most famously Irakly Andronikov – he had a phenomenal memory, and supposedly spoke 26 languages and 100 dialects. However, Nicolai Malko claimed that Sollertinsky was able to speak 32 languages, some of which were also considered dialects.

== Biography ==
Sollertinsky's father, Ivan Ivanovich Sollertinsky, came from a family of Russian Orthodox priests and served as a presiding judge, a privy councillor and a senator. His mother was Ekaterina Iosifovna Bobashinskaya, whose family belonged to a noble szlachta branch of the House of Sas.

Early in life he met Mikhail Bakhtin and took part in his philosophical meetings. After moving from Vitebsk to Leningrad, Sollertinsky graduated from the Leningrad University with a degree in Romano-Germanic philology, specializing in Spanish language and literature, particularly the works of Cervantes. In 1927 he became close friends with Dmitri Shostakovich, and is credited with introducing him to the works of Mahler, which had a profound impact on his composition style. Shostakovich's letters to Sollertinsky, written from 1927-1944, reveal many aspects of the composer's personality seen in few other sources, along with sharp opinions and crippling vulnerabilities.

Sollertinsky supported Shostakovich's opera, Lady Macbeth of the Mtsensk District, writing that it was an "enormous contribution to Soviet musical culture" in his 1934 review of it in Rabochii i Teatr (English: "Workers and Theatre"). In the wake of Shostakovich's first denunciation in 1936, Sollertinsky was called "the troubadour of formalism" by Pravda. Criticism of Lady Macbeth grew after its denunciation, resulting in mounting pressure on Sollertinsky to recant his previous statements, as he was largely blamed for influencing Shostakovich's "formalist" musical style by introducing him to the works of western composers. According to Isaac Glikman, a mutual friend of both Sollertinsky and Shostakovich, Sollertinsky did not denounce Lady Macbeth until Shostakovich told him to, out of concern for his safety. Once he retracted his previous positive statements on Lady Macbeth, Sollertinsky claimed that he would instead study the folklore of the Caucasus region and the Georgian language, perhaps to appeal to Stalin, a native of Georgia. While the denunciation did not deter Shostakovich and Sollertinsky's friendship, they did abandon plans to collaborate on a ballet adaptation of Don Quixote in 1936.

In 1938, Sollertinsky contracted diphtheria, which temporarily paralyzed his arms, legs, and jaw. During his hospitalization, he and his second wife, Irina Frantsevna, divorced, and he married his third wife, Olga Pantaleimonovna, who would remain with him until his death in 1944. Sollertinsky fathered a son with Olga Pantaleimonovna, Dmitri Ivanovich, named after Shostakovich, breaking a generations-long tradition in which the firstborn son was named Ivan. Olga Pantaleimonovna's son from a previous marriage, Kirill, was taken into his care as well. During his four-month period of hospitalization, from June to September, Sollertinsky studied Hungarian and continued to write articles on opera and art.

In August 1941, shortly after the German invasion of the Soviet Union, Sollertinsky evacuated from Leningrad with the Philharmonic to Novosibirsk. There, he engaged himself in a number of creative works with the Philharmonic, and frequently traveled in order to give speeches, lectures, and to attend other artistic and cultural events. While he was very much in demand as an orator and scholar during the war years, a heart condition that Sollertinsky's doctors had warned him of worsened due to his intense workload and his poor living conditions in Novosibirsk. By April 1943, he was denied a sufficient amount of food for himself and his family due to rationing, and his apartment was unheated. He and Shostakovich saw each other infrequently during the war years, but Vissarion Shebalin arranged for Sollertinsky to teach a course on music history at the conservatory in Moscow, where Shostakovich was living at the time. He briefly stayed in Moscow to give a speech on the anniversary of Tchaikovsky's death in November 1943, but returned to Novosibirsk with the intention to live and work in Moscow by February 1944. While in Novosibirsk, he delivered the opening remarks for the city's premiere of Shostakovich's Eighth Symphony, on February 5, 1943, which would be the last speech he was to give before his death. On the night of February 10, 1944, Sollertinsky, feeling unwell, stayed at the house of the conductor A.P. Novikov. He died in his sleep at the age of 41 and was buried at the Zayeltsovskoye Cemetery. His funeral was attended by his students, colleagues, and admirers of his work.

Shostakovich dedicated his Second Piano Trio op. 67 (started December 1943) to the memory of Sollertinsky. The lively second movement of the Trio, according to Sollertinsky's sister, Ekaterina Ivanovna, appears to be a "musical portrait" of its dedicatee, while the third movement, in Passacaglia form, is a solemn dirge. The fourth and most famous movement uses klezmer-inspired themes, a possible reference to the victims of the Holocaust, due to the fact that news of the genocide was reaching the Soviet Union at the time. It may also be interpreted as a reference to Sollertinsky's birthplace of Vitebsk, which was associated with famous Jewish artist Marc Chagall, and had a sizeable Jewish population until the Vitebsk Ghetto Massacre of 1941, a Nazi atrocity which took place in the city during the war; the klezmer theme is quoted in Shostakovich's 1960 String Quartet no. 8. Shostakovich's setting of Pasternak's translation of Shakespeare Sonnet no. 66 in his Six Romances on Verses by English Poets is dedicated to Sollertinsky as well.
