= Imitation (music) =

Repetition of a melody in a different voice/part of a musical composition

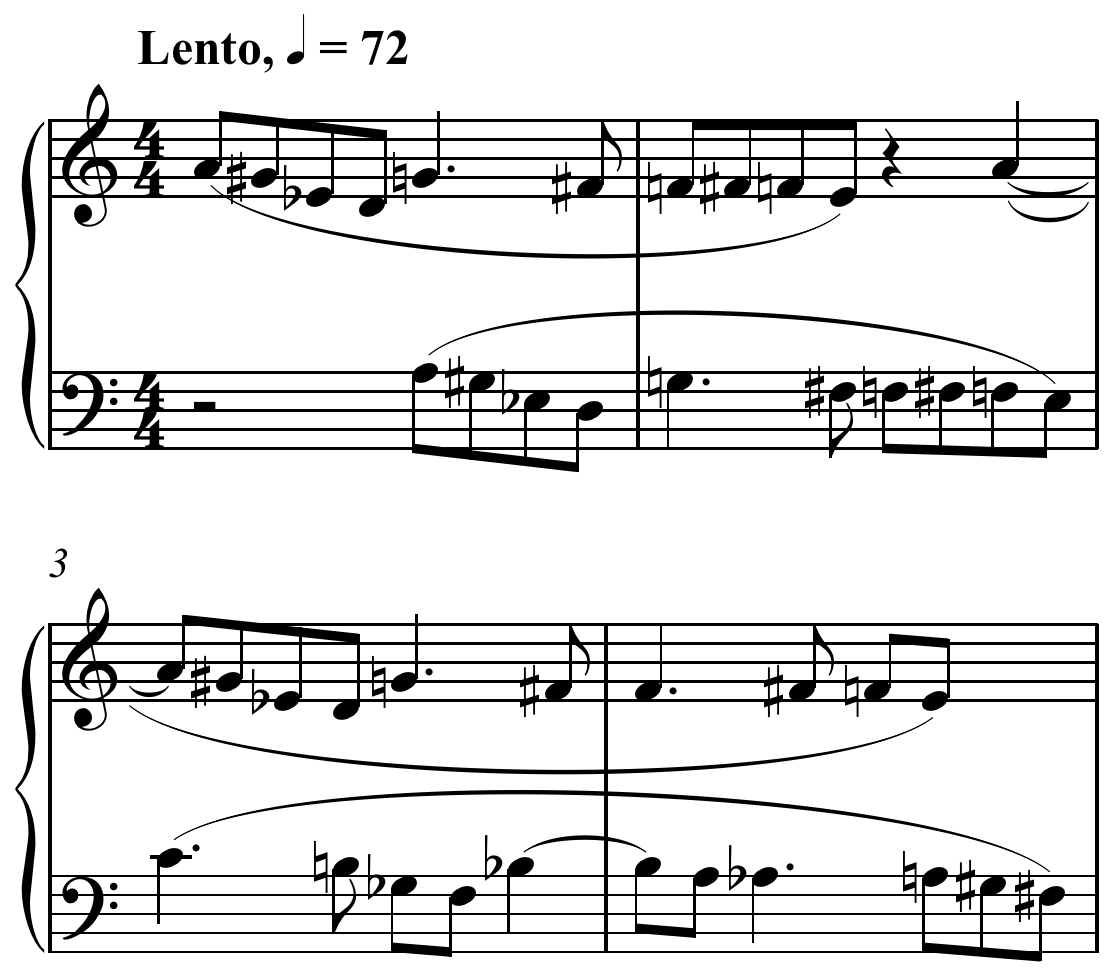
Imitation first at the octave then at the M6 in Bartók's "Chromatic Invention", Mikrokosmos (1926–1939), vol. III, no. 91, mm. 1–4.

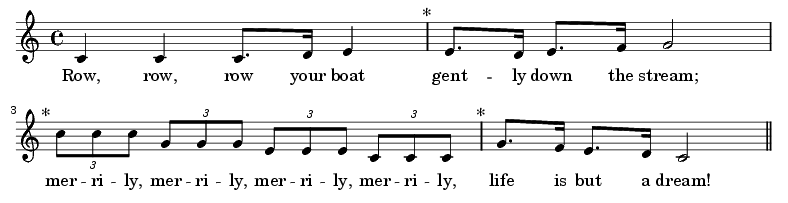
"Row, Row, Row Your Boat" (1852) round. A new part can join the singing by starting at the beginning whenever another part reaches any asterisk. If one ignores the sixteenth notes that pass between the main chords, every single note is in the tonic triad—in this case, a C, E, or G.

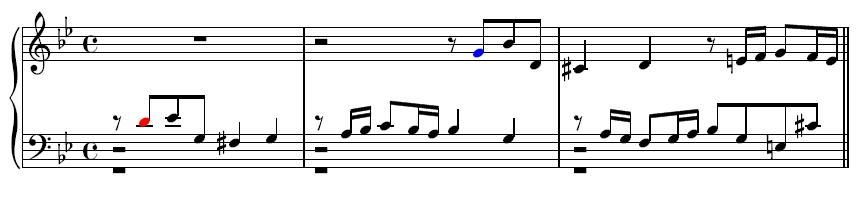
Example of a tonal answer in J.S. Bach's Fugue No. 16 in G minor, BWV 861, from The Well-Tempered Clavier, Book 1 (1722). ( Listen ) The first note of the subject, D, (in red) is a prominent dominant note, demanding that the first note of the answer (in blue) sounds as the tonic, G, rather than A.

In music, imitation is the repetition of a melody in a polyphonic texture shortly after its first appearance in a different voice. The melody may vary through transposition, inversion, or otherwise, but retain its original character. The intervals and rhythms of an imitation may be exact or modified. Imitation occurs at varying distances relative to the first occurrence, and phrases may begin with voices in imitation before they freely go their own ways.

Imitation helps provide unity to a composition and is used in forms such as the fugue and canon.

The near universality of imitation in polyphonic styles in Western music (and its frequency in homorhythmic, homophonic, and other textures) is evidence enough of its paradoxical value in asserting the individuality of voices.

== Definitions ==
When a phrase recurs exactly as before (except perhaps transposed), it is called strict imitation. A round is thus an example of strict imitation. Repetition is defined as the repetition of a phrase or melody often with variations in key, rhythm, and voice.

Different authors define imitation somewhat differently:

Real imitation[:] An imitation with no modifications except for the usual diatonic adjustment of half and whole steps. The exact transposition of a melody at different pitch levels.

— Benward & Saker (2003)

Imitation: the repetition of a motive or a fragment in a different voice.

— Spencer & Temko (1988)

Imitation[:] The repetition of a melody or melodic group in close succession, but in a different voice; the repetition of a melody at a different pitch level in a polyphonic texture.

— Benward & Saker

Imitation[:] The restatement in close succession of melodic figures in different voices in polyphonic textures.

— Benward & Saker (2009)

homodirectional imitation...contradirectional...contrarhythmic imitation...contraintervallic imitation...free imitation...strict imitation...rhythmic imitation...contour imitation

— Wallace Berry

The point of imitation, "marks the beginning of a series of imitative entries in a contrapuntal composition." In counterpoint, imitation occurs in a second voice, usually at a different pitch. A short phrase treated imitatively is called an attacco.

== Use in various musical styles ==
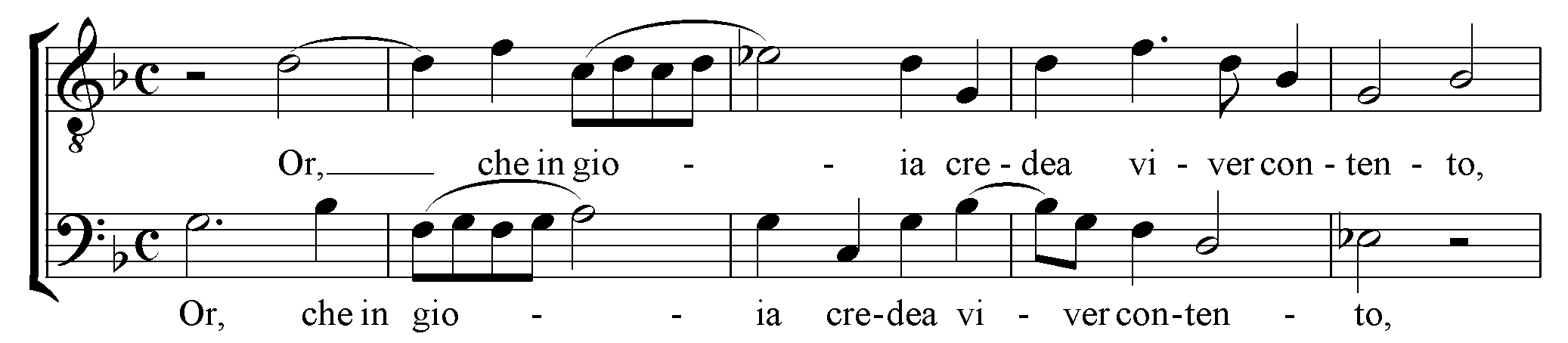
Imitation at the opening of Carlo Gesualdo's "Or, che in gioia credea" (1596)

In European classical music, imitative writing was featured heavily in the highly polyphonic compositions of the Renaissance and Baroque eras. A more improvisatory form of imitation can be found in Arab and Indian vocal music where the instrumentalist may accompany the vocalist in a vocal improvisation with imitation.

In pop music a much clichéd form of imitation consists of a background choir repeating—usually the last notes—of the lead singer's last line. See: fill (music).

== Examples in classical music ==
=== Andrea Gabrieli's Ricercare ===
Imitation featured in both instrumental and vocal music of the Renaissance. In the following passage from a ricercar by Andrea Gabrieli, the instruments at first imitate at a distance of two beats. Towards the end of the episode, bars 11–12, the imitation becomes closer, at a distance of only one beat:

Andrea Gabrieli's Ricercare del 12o tono

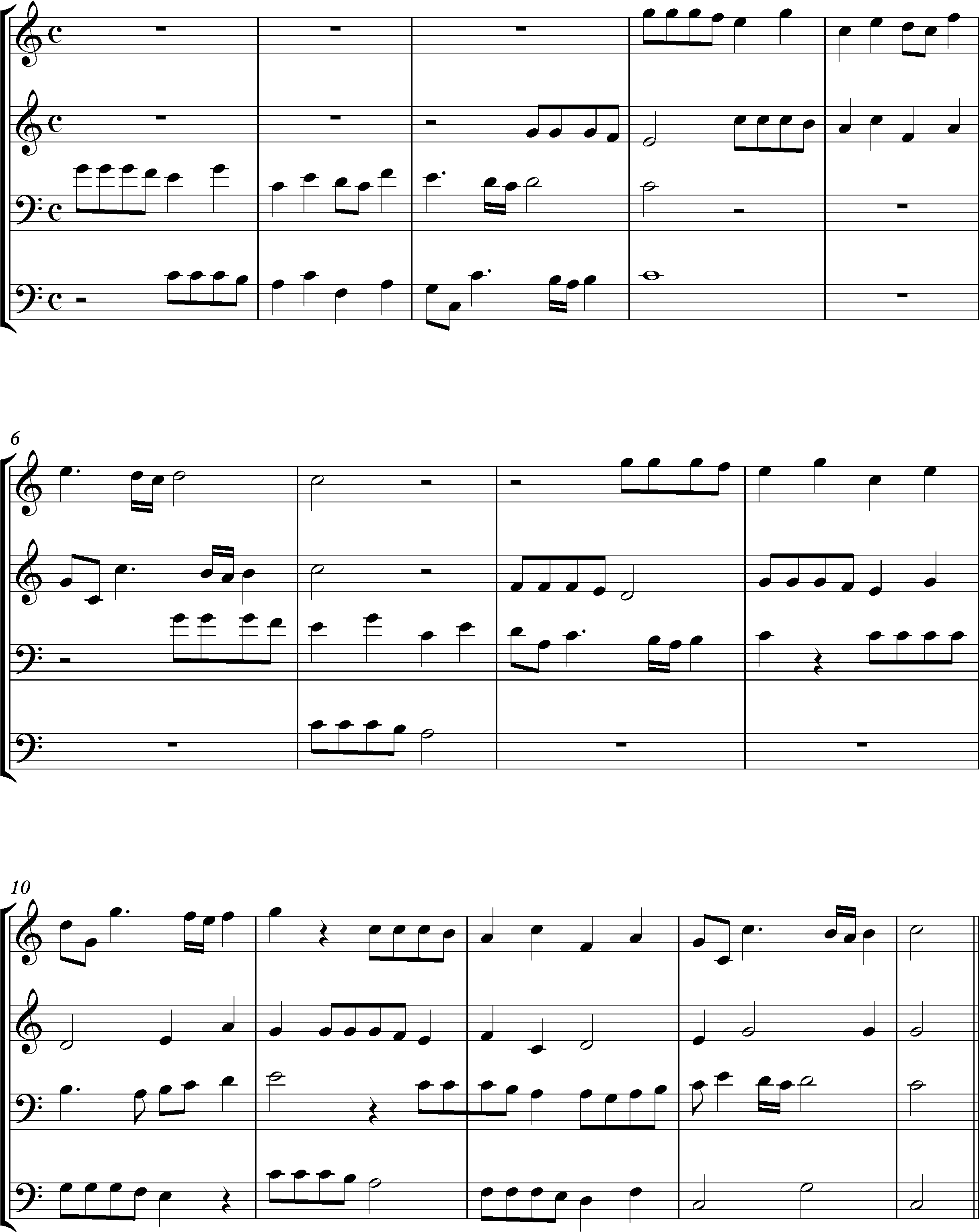
Andrea Gabrieli Ricercare del 12o tono

=== J.S. Bach's Fugue in B♭ minor BWV 867 ===
The fugues of J.S. Bach contain a variety of examples of imitation. The Fugue in B♭ minor BWV 867 from The Well-tempered Clavier opens with a subject that is imitated at the interval of a fifth higher and at a distance of four beats:

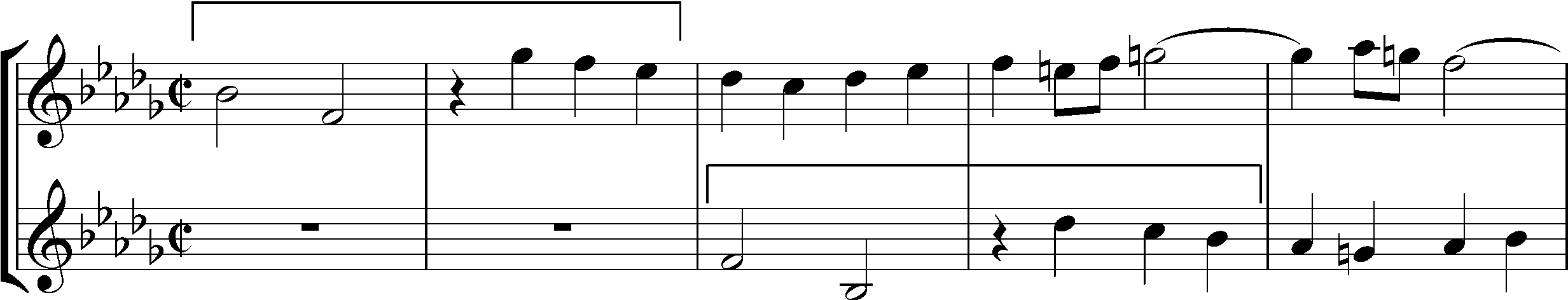
J.S. Bach's Fugue in B♭ minor BWV 867 from The Well-tempered Clavier, opening

Later, the theme is imitated through all five parts at the distance of just one beat:

J.S. Bach's Fugue in B♭ minor BWV 867 from The Well-tempered Clavier, closing bars

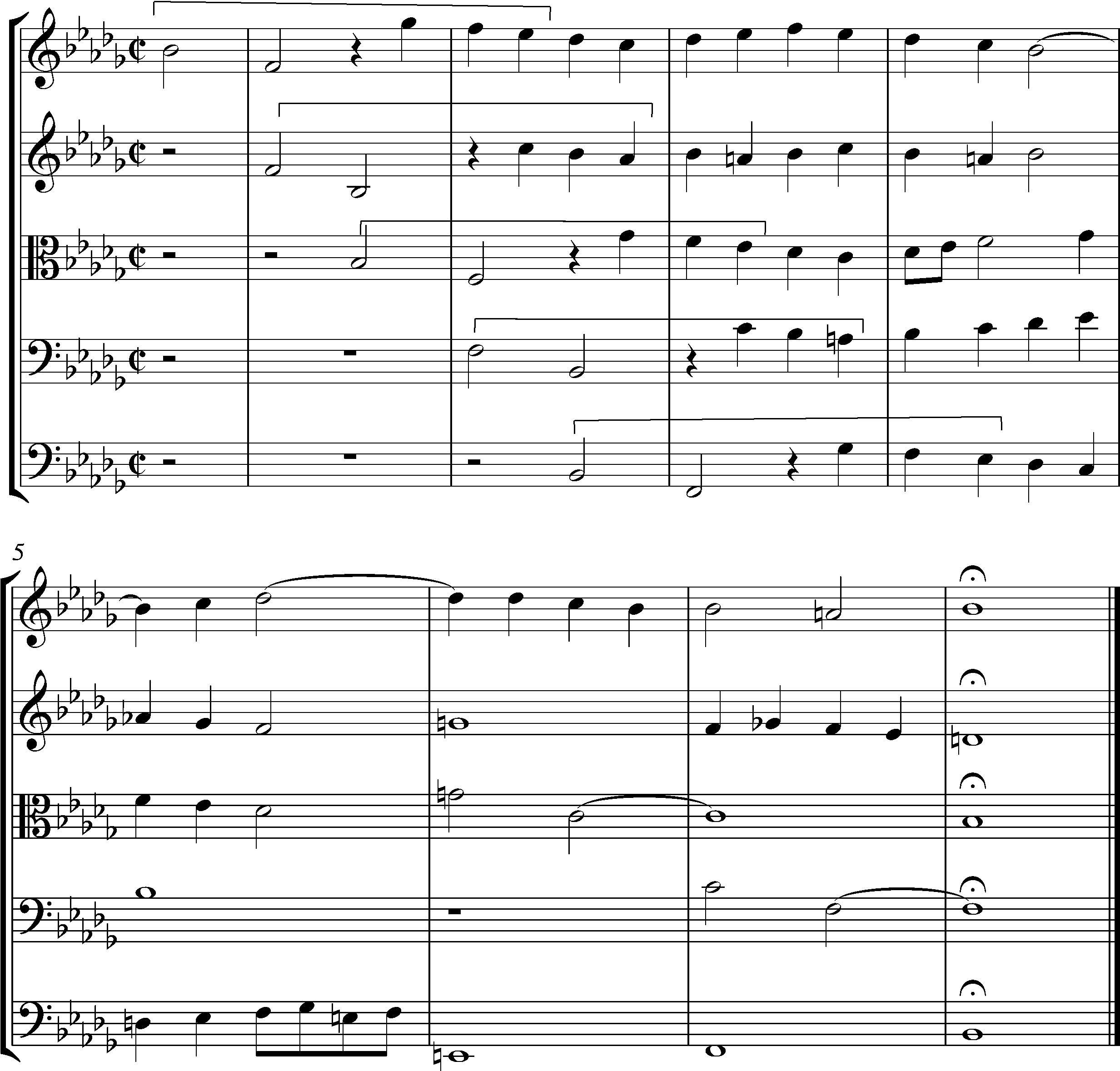
J.S. Bach's Fugue in B♭ minor BWV 867 from The Well-tempered Clavier, closing bars

This type of closely followed imitation is characteristic of fugues as they build towards a conclusion. It is known as stretto.

=== Mozart's Kegelstatt Trio, K. 498 ===
In the minuet of Mozart's Kegelstatt Trio, K. 498, there are intricate passages that gain in interest and coherence through use of imitation. Starting at bar 76, the clarinet is followed at a distance of three beats by the viola, then by the piano's right hand and finally, the left. In bars 84–6, the piano creates an even closer chromatic weave, where the imitation is at the distance of only one beat:

Mozart Minuet from Trio K498, bars 76–86

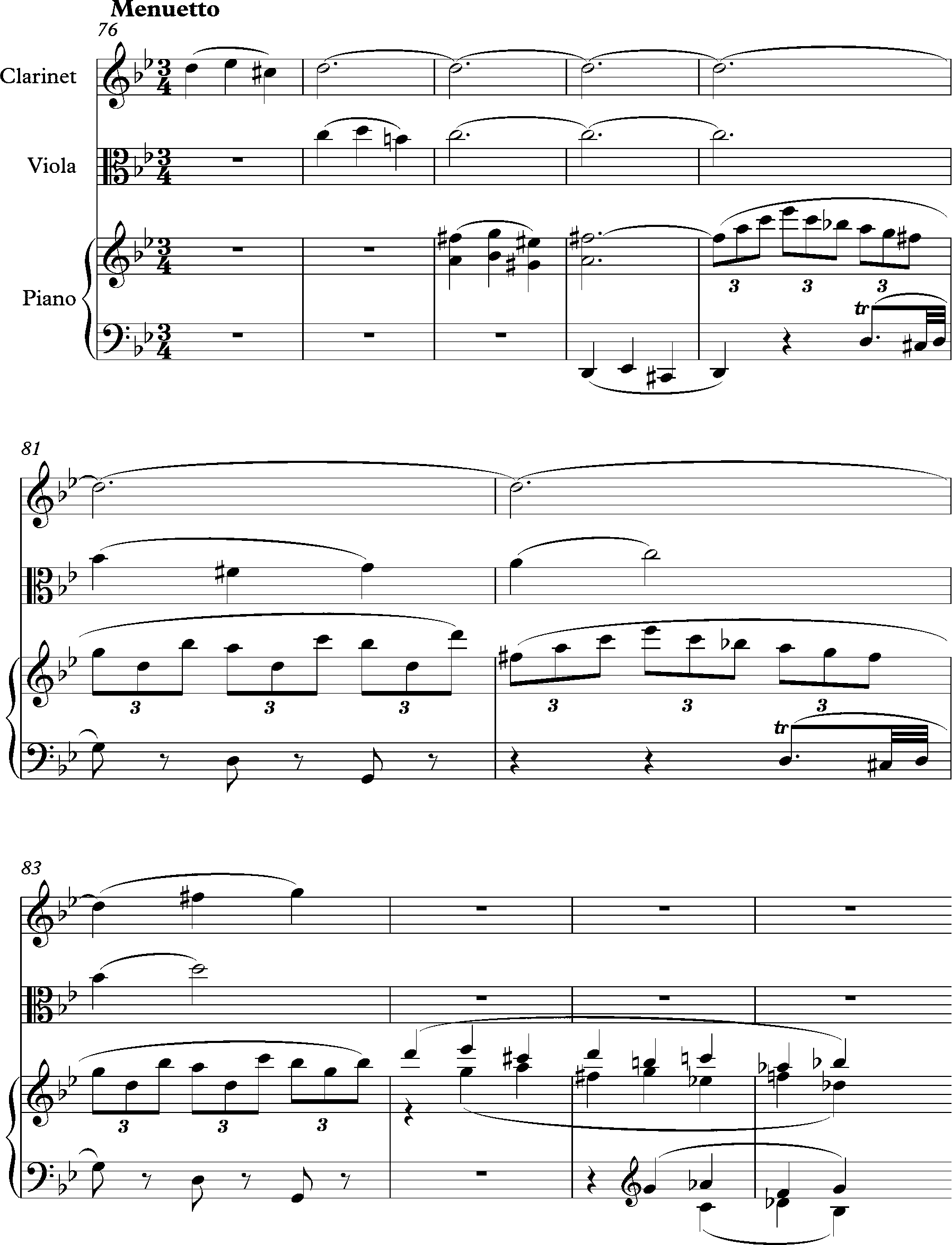
Minuet from Mozart's Kegelstatt Trio, K. 498, bars 76–86

A more straightforward example of close imitation occurs later in the same movement at bars 94–100. This is the linking passage that heralds the return of the opening of the minuet. The clarinet plays a sustained pedal note while the three lines played by the viola and the pianist's two hands express a single harmony, the dominant seventh (F7), to prepare for the return of the minuet in the key of B flat major, the tonic key:

Minuet from Mozart's Kegelstatt Trio, K. 498, bars 94–100

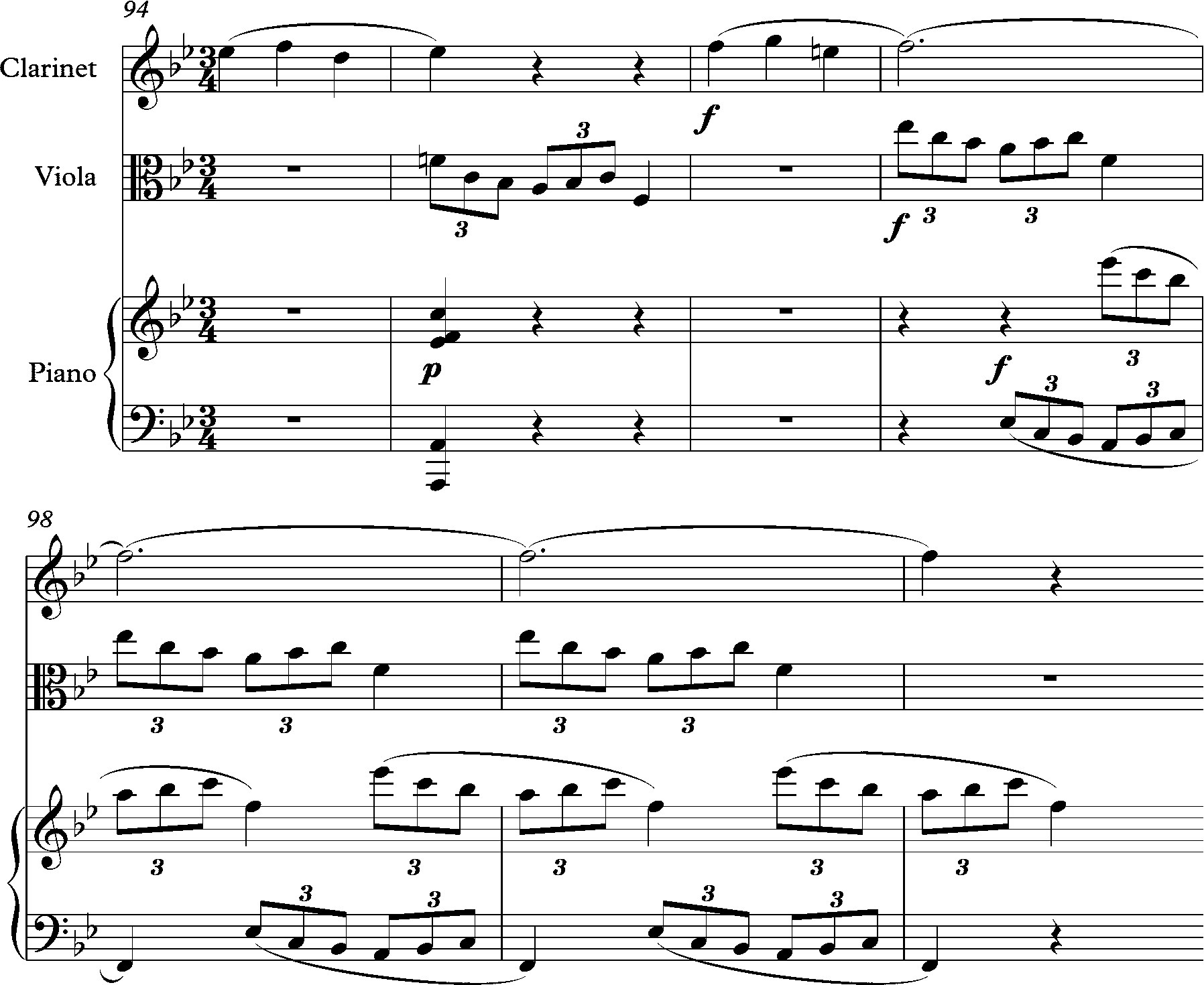
Minuet from Mozart's Kegelstatt Trio, K. 498, bars 94–100

== See also ==
- Melodic pattern
- Sequence (music)
- Call and response (music)
- Stretto
- Augmentation (music)
- Diminution
- Retrograde (music)
