= Cello Concerto No. 1 (Shostakovich) =

1959 concerto for cello and orchestra by Dmitri Shostakovich

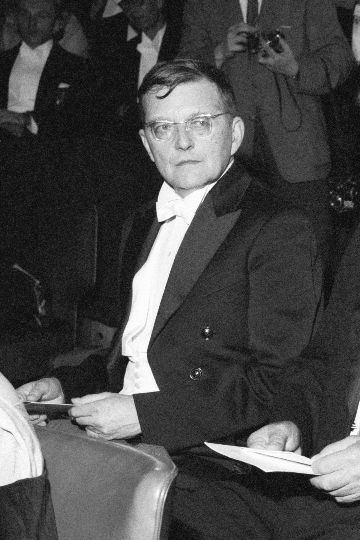
Dmitri Shostakovich in 1958

The Cello Concerto No. 1 in E♭ major, Op. 107, was composed in 1959 by Dmitri Shostakovich. Shostakovich wrote the work for his friend Mstislav Rostropovich, who committed it to memory in four days. He premiered it on October 4, 1959, at the Large Hall of the Leningrad Conservatory with the Leningrad Philharmonic Orchestra conducted by Yevgeny Mravinsky. The first recording was made in two days following the premiere by Rostropovich and the Moscow Philharmonic Orchestra conducted by Aleksandr Gauk.

The first concerto is widely considered to be one of the most difficult concert works for cello, along with the Sinfonia Concertante of Sergei Prokofiev, with which it shares certain features (such as the prominent role of isolated timpani strokes). Shostakovich said that "an impulse" for the piece was provided by his admiration for that earlier work.

A typical performance runs approximately 28 minutes in length.

== Scoring ==
The concerto is scored for solo cello, two flutes (2nd doubling piccolo), two oboes, two clarinets (each doubling B♭ and A), two bassoons (2nd doubling contrabassoon), one horn, timpani, celesta, and strings.

== Movements ==
The work has four movements in two sections:

1. Allegretto
2. Moderato
3. Cadenza (attacca)
4. Allegro con moto

The second, third and fourth movements are played continuously.

=== I. Allegretto ===
The first movement begins with a four-note main motive some believe is derived from the composer's musical cryptogram D-S-C-H for his name DSCH. The concerto motive is only remotely related, specifically by both being four-note motives having a half-step between the third and fourth notes. The intervals, rhythm and shape of the motto are continually distorted and re-shaped throughout the movement. It is also related to a theme from the composer's score for the 1948 film The Young Guard, which illustrates a group of Soviet soldiers being marched to their deaths at the hands of the Nazis. The theme reappears in Shostakovich's String Quartet No. 8 (1960).

The theme is simplified even further in the woodwind, which reappears throughout the work:

The opening bars of the first movement in piano and cello reduction, showing the initial themes of the cello and woodwind.

The opening motive recurs throughout the concerto (except in the second movement), giving this concerto a cyclic structure.

=== II. Moderato ===
The second movement is initially elegiac in tone. The string section begins with a quiet theme that is never played by the solo cello. The horn answers and the solo cello begins a new theme. The orchestra plays it after and the first theme is played again. The cello plays its second theme, which progressively becomes more agitated, building to a climax in bar 148. This is immediately followed by the first theme played loudly. The solo cello plays its first melody in artificial harmonics with answers by the celesta, which leads into the cadenza. The second movement is the only movement with no reference to the opening motive of the first movement.

=== III. Cadenza (attacca) ===
The cadenza stands as a movement in itself. It begins by developing the material from the cello's second theme of the second movement, twice broken by a series of slow pizzicato chords. After the second time this is repeated, the cello's first theme of the second movement is played in an altered form. After the third time the chords are repeated, a continual accelerando passes through allegretto and allegro sections to a piu mosso section. These sections are frequented by the first movement motive. The piu mosso section features fast ascending and descending scales.

=== IV. Allegro con moto ===
The final movement begins with an ascent to a high D. The oboe begins the main theme, which is based on the chromatic scale. The cello repeats it, then presents a new theme. The cellos of the orchestra repeat this, accompanied by the solo cello playing fast sixteenth notes. At bar 105, a distorted version of Suliko, a song favoured by Stalin and used by Shostakovich in Rayok, his satire on the Soviet system, is played. Then, the flutes play the first theme again.

A new theme played in triple time is presented by the orchestra, which is repeated by the cello. Then, the orchestra repeats and alters the theme. The horn, bass instruments and solo cello follow. The bass instruments play a modified version of the theme, which is repeated by the solo cello after. The cello begins playing a new theme that uses exactly the same notes as the opening motif. The modified version that was just played by bass instruments is repeated by the solo cello, accompanied by oboes playing fragments of the new opening motive.

The first theme of this movement is played by the string section after, followed by the new opening motive theme in the woodwinds. The opening theme of the first movement is played, answered by the cello. After the third time this is played, the horn plays the theme again in longer notes. Then, the cello plays a passage from the first movement, which is followed by the first theme of this movement played by the woodwinds. This is followed by the first theme of the first movement played by the cellos of the orchestra, accompanied by scales in the solo cello. Then, a modified form of the first theme of this movement is played in the cello. The concerto ends with seven timpani strokes.
