= Igor Levit =

Russian-German pianist (born 1987)

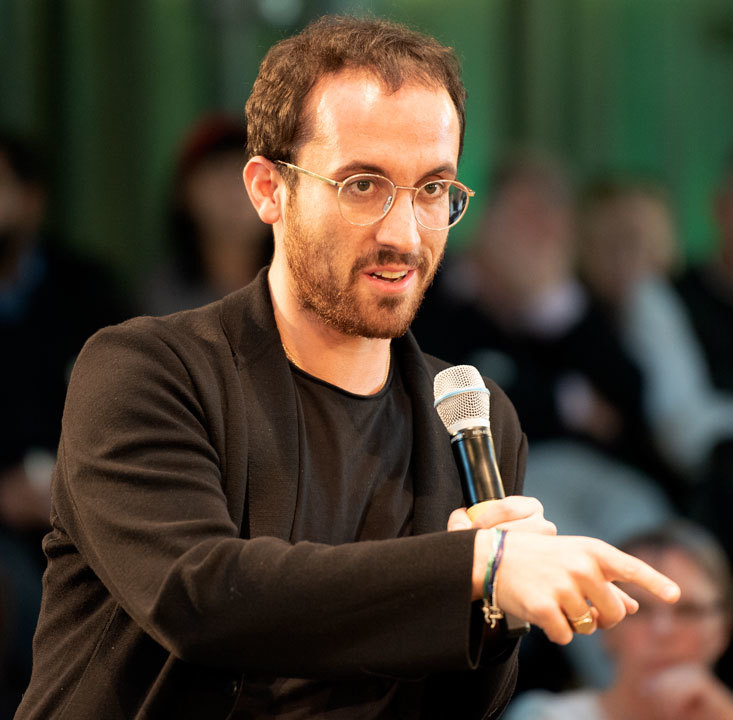
- Levit in 2019
- Born: Russian: Игорь Левит; 10 March 1987 (age 39); Gorky, Russian SFSR, Soviet Union
- Education: Mozarteum; Musikhochschule Hannover
- Occupations: Classical pianist; Professor
- Organizations: Musikhochschule Hannover
- Awards: Arthur Rubinstein Competition; Beethoven Ring; Gilmore Artist Award

Igor Levit (Russian: Игорь Левит; born 10 March 1987) is a Russian-German pianist who focuses on the works of Bach, Beethoven, and Liszt, and has also recorded modern pieces, including Dmitri Shostakovich's 24 Preludes and Fugues, Ronald Stevenson's Passacaglia on DSCH, Frederic Rzewski's The People United Will Never Be Defeated!, and Morton Feldman's Palais de Mari. He is also a professor at the Musikhochschule Hannover. He lives in Berlin.

== Biography ==
Born in Gorky (now Nizhny Novgorod) to a Jewish family, Levit began playing piano at the age of three. He received piano lessons from his mother Elena Levit, a piano teacher, répétiteur and grand-disciple of Heinrich Neuhaus. As a child, he had his first successes on the concert stage in his hometown. His family moved to Hannover in 1995. From 1999 to 2000, he studied at the Mozarteum in Salzburg with Hans Leygraf and, from 2000 to 2010, at the Hochschule für Musik, Theater und Medien Hannover with Karl-Heinz Kämmerling, Matti Raekallio and Bernd Goetzke.

Levit has appeared in major concert halls and music festivals around the world. During his studies, he won prizes in several international competitions including second prize at the International Maria Callas Grand Prix in Athens (2004), first prize at the 9th Hamamatsu International Piano Academy Competition in Hamamatsu (2004), the second prize at the piano competition Kissinger Klavierolymp (2004), the silver medal and three other awards at the Arthur Rubinstein International Piano Master Competition in Tel Aviv (2005). In October 2011, he appeared in a 45-minute documentary aired on 3sat about his love for the music of Franz Liszt. He was a BBC Radio 3 New Generation Artist from 2011 to 2013.

Levit was appointed to a professorship at the Hochschule für Musik, Theater und Medien Hannover (Hannover University of Music, Drama and Media) starting in the winter semester 2019/2020. In 2021, Levit contributed a cover of the Metallica song "Nothing Else Matters" to the charity tribute album The Metallica Blacklist.

Levit was appointed professor at the Mozarteum University Salzburg starting October 2028.

== Awards ==
- 2009 Luitpold Prize for young artists at the Festival Kissinger Sommer in Bad Kissingen
- 2017 Beethoven Ring
- 2018 Gilmore Artist Award
- 2020 Gramophone Classical Music Awards – Artist of the Year and Instrumental Category Winner (Beethoven Complete Piano Sonatas)
- 1 October 2020 Order of Merit of the Federal Republic of Germany
- 2024 Buber-Rosenzweig-Medal
- 2025 Kaiser Otto Prize

== Hauskonzerte ==
During the Coronavirus pandemic of 2020, Levit began streaming concerts from his home in Berlin Mitte. He posted these to Twitter as a series of Hauskonzerte:

- 12 March 2020: Beethoven's Piano Sonata No. 21 in C major, Op. 53 ('Waldstein')
- 13 March 2020: Rzewski's The People United Will Never Be Defeated!
- 14 March 2020: Bach's Chaconne in a transcription for left hand by Brahms
- 15 March 2020: Beethoven's Piano Sonata No. 23 in F minor, Op. 57 ('Appassionata')
- 17 March 2020: Beethoven's Piano Sonata No. 14 in C♯ minor "Quasi una fantasia" ('Moonlight')
- 18 March 2020: Schubert's "Six moments musicaux"
- 19 March 2020: Schubert's Piano Sonata in B♭ major, D. 960
- 20 March 2020: Schubert's Piano Sonata in A major, D. 959
- 21 March 2020: Schumann's Fantasie in C major, Op. 17
- 22 March 2020: Shostakovich's Piano Sonata No. 2 in B minor, Op. 61
- 23 March 2020: Beethoven's Piano Sonata No. 31 in A♭ major, Op. 110
- 24 March 2020: Arrangements of Bach's Nun komm' der heiden Heiland, BWV 659, and Ich ruf zu dir, Herr Jesu Christ, BWV 639; and Busoni's Berceuse, BV 252, and Fantasia nach Johann Sebastian Bach, BV 253
- 25 March 2020: Beethoven's Piano Sonata No. 17 in D minor, Op. 31/2 ('Tempest')
- 28 March 2020: Mozart's Piano Sonata No. 17 in B♭ major, K. 570
- 29 March 2020: Transcriptions of Mahler's Adagietto, Billy Joel's "And So It Goes", Frederic Rzewski's "A Mensch", and Frederic Weatherly's "Danny Boy"
- 30 March 2020: Beethoven's Piano Sonata No. 18 in E♭ major, Op. 31/3
- 31 March 2020: Liszt's Sonetto 123 del Petrarca in A♭ major; Brahms' Intermezzo in A major Op. 118/2; and Liszt's transcription of Wagner's "Isoldens Liebestod"
- 1 April 2020: Schubert's Impromptu No. 3 in G♭ major and Allegretto in C minor, D. 915; Brahms' Ballade in B major, Op. 10/4
- 2 April 2020: Beethoven's Piano Sonata No. 21 in C major, Op. 53 ('Waldstein'), streamed from the Schloss Bellevue concert room
- 3 April 2020: Two of Mendelssohn's "Songs Without Words"; Jobim's "Luiza"; Schumann's "Du bist wie eine Blume"; and Janis Ian's "Stars"
- 4 April 2020: Solovyov-Sedoi & Matusovsky's "Moscow Nights"; Gershwin's "Rhapsody in Blue"
- 5 April 2020: Tchaikovsky's "The Seasons" (except "September")
- 6 April 2020: Tchaikovsky's "September" (from "The Seasons"); Beethoven's Piano Sonata No. 8 in C minor, Op. 13 ('Pathétique')
- 7 April 2020: Satie's Gnossienne No. 3 and Gymnopédie No. 1; Fred Hersch's "Valentine"; and Beethoven's "Rondo alla ingharese quasi un capriccio" in G major, Op. 129 ('Rage Over a Lost Penny')
- 8 April 2020: Shostakovich's 24 Preludes Op. 34
- 9 April 2020: Three of Scott Joplin's Rags; Bolcom's "Graceful Ghost Rag"; Schubert's "Hungarian Melody"; and Curran's "For Cornelius"
- 10 April 2020: Dessau's "Guernica"; Rzewski's "Which Side Are You On?"; and Cardew's Thälmann Variations
- 11 April 2020: Liszt's "Il penseroso" in C♯ minor and Dante Sonata in D minor
- 12 April 2020: Beethoven's Piano Sonata No. 32 in C minor, Op. 111
- 13 April 2020: Beethoven's Diabelli Variations, Op. 120
- 14 April 2020: Beethoven's 6 Variations in F major, Op. 34; and Piano Sonata No. 6 in F major, Op. 10/2
- 15 April 2020: Beethoven's Piano Sonata No. 26 in E♭ major, Op. 81a ('les Adieux')
- 17 April 2020: Mussorgsky's "Pictures at an Exhibition"
- 18 April 2020: Schumann's Arabeske in C major, Op. 18; transcription of Mahler's Adagio from Symphony No. 10
- 19 April 2020: Bach's "Contrapunctus I" from The Art of Fugue; Busoni's Fantasia contrappuntistica
- 20 April 2020: Stevenson's Passacaglia on DSCH
- 21 April 2020: Alkan's Prelude No. 8 in A♭ minor, Op. 31 ('The Song of the Madwoman on the Seashore'); Hindemith's "Suite 1922"
- 22 April 2020: Beethoven's Piano Sonata No. 23 in F minor, Op. 57 ('Appassionata')
- 23 April 2020: Liszt's "Feierlicher Marsch zum heiligen Gral aus Parsifal", S. 450; Prokofiev's Piano Sonata No. 7 in B♭ major, Op. 83
- 24 April 2020: Liszt's "O du mein holder Abendstern", S. 444; Prokofiev's Piano Sonata No. 4 in C minor, Op. 29
- 25 April 2020: Liszt's paraphrase of "Valhalla" (from Wagner's Das Rheingold); Prokofiev's Piano Sonata No. 9 in C major, Op. 103
- 26 April 2020: Schumann's Theme and Variations in E♭ major for piano ('Geistervariationen'); Feldman's "Palais de Mari"
- 27 April 2020: Reger's "Variations and Fugue on a Theme by J.S. Bach", Op. 81
- 28 April 2020: Beethoven's Piano Sonata No. 2 in A major, Op. 2/2
- 29 April 2020: Three of Mendelssohn's Songs Without Words; Debussy's Six épigraphes antiques; Second movement of Schubert's Piano Sonata in A major, D. 664
- 30 April 2020: Beethoven's Ländler; Beethoven's Piano Sonata No. 30 in E major, Op. 109; Chopin's Scherzo No. 3 in C♯ minor, Op. 39
- 2 May 2020: Bach's Goldberg Variations, BWV 988
- 3 May 2020: Six of Brahms' Choral Preludes, Op. 122 (transcribed by Busoni)
- 4 May 2020: Beethoven's Piano Sonata No. 16 in G Major, Op. 31/1; Beethoven's Piano Sonata No. 27 in E minor, Op. 90
- 24 May 2020: Ten of Bach's Chorale Preludes (transcribed by Busoni (BV B 27))

Separately from these concerts, on 30/31 May 2020 Levit gave a solo performance of Vexations by Erik Satie, from a studio in Berlin, over a period of more than 15 hours. He played it again, this time in London's Queen Elizabeth Hall, in April 2025.

== Discography ==
In 2007, when he was 20 years old, Levit released his debut album, a set of Beethoven's piano concertos, with the Cologne Chamber Orchestra, conducted by Helmut Müller-Brühl on Naxos records. In 2013, he released a two-disc set of Ludwig van Beethoven's late piano sonatas (Nos. 28 to 32), on Sony Classical Records. His second Sony album, a recording of Johann Sebastian Bach's six keyboard partitas, was named Gramophone Magazine's recording of the month for October 2014. His third Sony album, a 3-CD set of Bach's Goldberg Variations, Beethoven's Diabelli Variations, and The People United Will Never Be Defeated! by Frederic Rzewski, was released in October 2015. His fourth album was a 2-CD set released in 2018 entitled Life, including works by Busoni, Bach, Schumann, Rzewski, Wagner, Liszt, and Bill Evans. It was Levit's response to the death of his best friend, German artist Hannes Malte Mahler, who died in a bicycle accident in 2016.

His recordings of the complete Beethoven Piano Sonatas were released by Sony Classical on 13 September 2019. Levit was named Gramophone's 2020 Artist of the Year. His recording On DSCH, pairing Shostakovich's 24 Preludes and Fugues Op.87 with Ronald Stevenson's epic Passacaglia on DSCH, was issued by Sony in 2021. His other recordings include:

- Levit, Igor (2020), Igor Levit Encounter, OCLC 1199777487 It "feature[s] arrangements by Busoni of chorale preludes by Bach [and by Brahms], Brahms's Vier ernste Gesänge arranged by Reger, Reger's Nachtlied arranged by Julian Becker, and finally Palais de Mari, Morton Feldman's final work for solo piano."
- "Paavo Järvi and Igor Levit perform Beethovens Piano Concerto No. 5 = Paavo Järvi und Igor Levit mit Beethovens Klavierkonzert Nr. 5". 2020. OCLC 1296623187.
- The 2021 Vienna Philharmonic Summer Night Concert : With Daniel Harding and Igor Levit, 2021, OCLC 1334798677
- Sir Antonio Pappano conducts Schumann and Beethoven – With Igor Levit : Royal Concertgebouw Orchestra, 2021, OCLC 1252973781
- Levit, Igor (2022), Tristan. Tristan features Hans Werner Henze's Tristan, written for piano, electronic tapes, and orchestra; and, arranged for piano, Wagner's prelude to Tristan und Isolde and the Adagio from Mahler's Tenth Symphony.
- Levit, Igor (2023), Fantasia. Fantasia features Bach, Liszt, Alban Berg, and Busoni.
- Levit, Igor (2023), Mendelssohn Lieder Ohne Worte (Songs Without Words).
- Levit, Igor (2024), Brahms. Includes Brahms' two piano concertos with Christian Thielemann and the Wiener Philharmoniker, and various solo pieces by Brahms.

== Albums ==
Year	Title	Record label
2007	Beethoven: Piano Concertos Nos. 1–5	Naxos
2013	Beethoven: The Late Piano Sonatas	Sony Classical
2014	Bach Partitas	Sony Classical
2015	Bach Beethoven Rzewski	Sony Classical
2018	Life	Sony Classical
2019	Beethoven: The Complete Piano Sonatas	Sony Classical
2020	Encounter	Sony Classical
2021	On DSCH	Sony Classical
2022	Tristan	Sony Classical
2023	Fantasia	Sony Classical
2023	Mendelssohn: Lieder ohne Worte	Sony Classical
2024	Brahms: Concertos, etc.	Sony Classical

== Writings ==
- Levit, Igor; Zinnecker, Florian (2022). Hauskonzert (in German). München: btb Verlag. ISBN 978-3-442-77173-8. OCLC 1309075504.
- Levit, Igor; Drake, Carolyn; Grätz, Ronald; Neubauer, Hans-Joachim (2022). Mein Leben mit der Gegenwart ein Gespräch (in German). Göttingen. ISBN 978-3-96999-011-7. OCLC 1309976330.

== Film ==
- Igor Levit, Mein Liszt (in German), 3Sat, 2011, OCLC 918114930
- Igor Levit: No Fear (in German), 2023
