= Op. 117 =

In music, Op. 117 stands for Opus number 117. Compositions that are assigned this number include:

- Beethoven – King Stephen
- Brahms – Three Intermezzi
- Fauré – Cello Sonata No. 2
- Mendelssohn - Albumblatt (Album Leaf) in A minor, Op. 117, "Lied ohne Worte"
- Polevoy – The Story of a Real Man
- Schumann – 4 Husarenlieder
- Shostakovich – String Quartet No. 9
