= String Quartet in A-flat major =

String Quartet in A-flat major may refer to:

- String Quartet No. 14 (Dvořák)
- String Quartet No. 10 (Shostakovich)
