= Mark Gasser =

British concert pianist

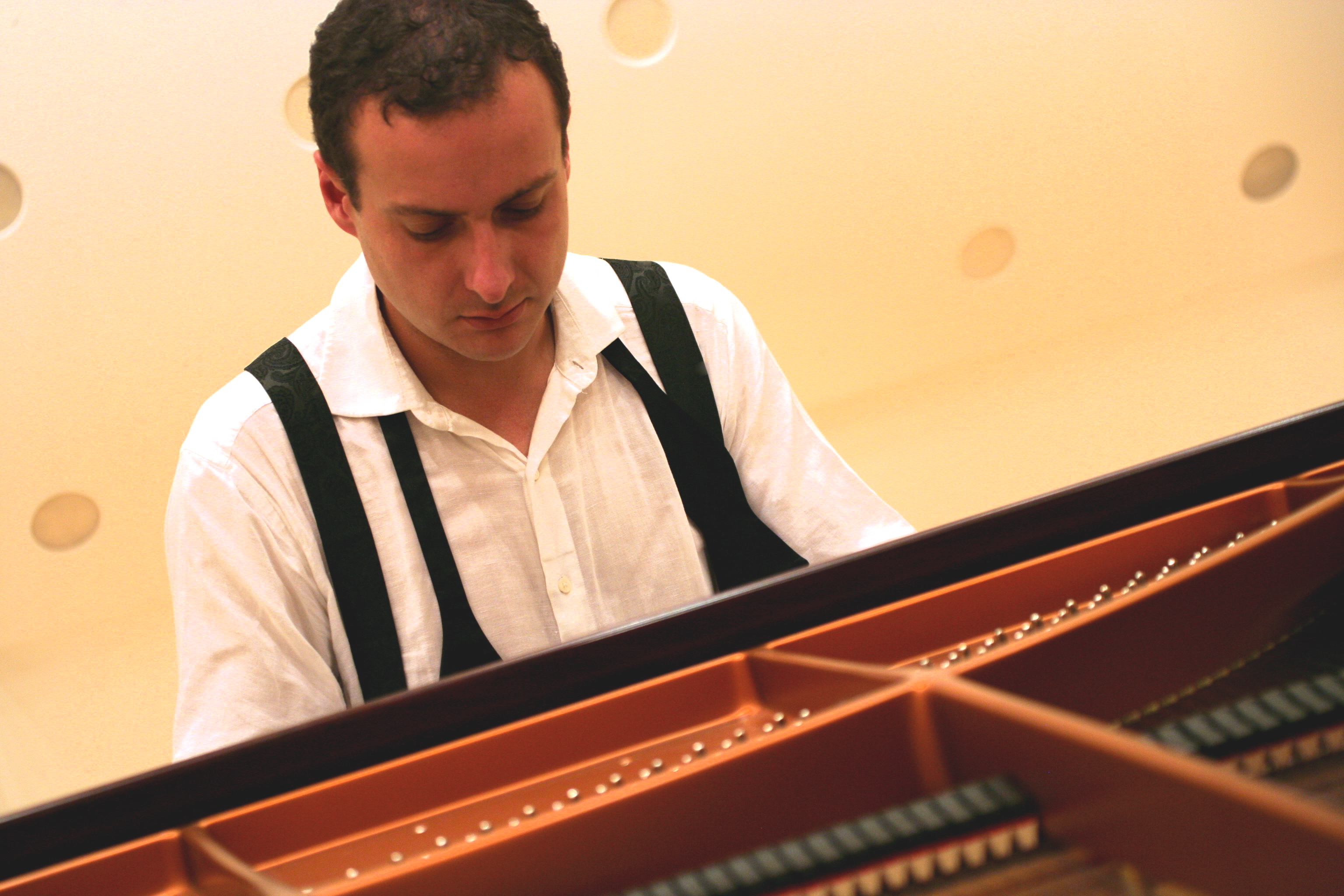
- Mark Gasser at a recording session in Newcastle, NSW, in March 2007

Background information
- Born: 6 July 1972 (age 54); Sheffield, England
- Genres: Baroque, Classical, Romantic 20th century
- Occupations: Pianist, classical musician, academic
- Instrument: Piano

Mark Gasser (born 6 July 1972) is a British concert pianist.

== Career ==
Gasser was born in Sheffield, in the West Riding of Yorkshire, in 1972 to Austrian and Scottish parents. He studied with John Humphreys at the Royal Birmingham Conservatoire, and with Frank Wibaut at the Royal Academy of Music, and is a fellow of both institutions. Later he also studied with Alfred Brendel and Peter Donohoe.

Gasser plays large-scale standard repertoire piano works, in particular the Viennese Classics (Mozart, Beethoven and Schubert) and Grieg, Mendelssohn, Busoni, and Rachmaninoff, and the French Impressionists Debussy and Ravel. His repertoire ranges from Bach's Goldberg Variations to Messiaen's Vingt regards sur l'enfant-Jésus, as well as collaborations with living composers.

As a chamber musician he has performed in all the major chamber music festivals in the United States, Europe and Australia and has toured with the virtuoso cellist Mats Lidström.

His concerto repertoire includes more than 70 works ranging from Bach to music from the present day. Gasser collaborates with contemporary composers and has premiered and recorded compositions by 20th-century composers such as Alfred Schnittke, Ross Edwards, Constant Lambert, Benjamin Britten, Henri Pousseur, Henry Cowell, Toru Takemitsu, George Crumb, James MacMillan, Alistair Zaldua, Michael Tippett, John Webb, James Dillon, Phillip Whilby, Richard Barrett, Cat Hope, Aldo Clementi, Mike Vaughan, John Cage, Luigi Dallapiccola, John Adams, Mark-Anthony Turnage, Olivier Messiaen, Luigi Nono, Edgard Varèse, Judith Bingham, Pierre Boulez, Joël-François Durand, Frank Zappa, György Ligeti and Ronald Stevenson. Gasser has also worked with contemporary artists such as Pink, Jarvis Cocker and Björk.

Gasser performed Stevenson's Passacaglia on DSCH at Carnegie Hall as a charity concert shortly after the attacks on the World Trade Center in New York City, to raise money for the families of rescue workers who died in the September 11 attacks, and most recently at the Utzon Room, Sydney Opera House (2012) to launch Yamaha's CFX Concert Grand Piano in Australia.

Gasser was a founding member of the Thallein Ensemble and has performed in some of the world's major concert halls and music festivals and has been a soloist with a number of symphony orchestras. He was named "Bösendorfer Artist of the Year" In 2002. Since 21 October 2009 Gasser has been an exclusive Yamaha Artist.

From 2011 – 2013 Gasser was a staff member of the Keyboard Faculty of the Western Australian Academy of Performing Arts in Perth, Western Australia where he also achieved the award of PhD. From 2013 to 2015 Gasser was CEO and Artistic Director of the Aboriginal Centre for the Performing Arts in Brisbane, Queensland. He currently lives in Melbourne.

== Masterclasses ==
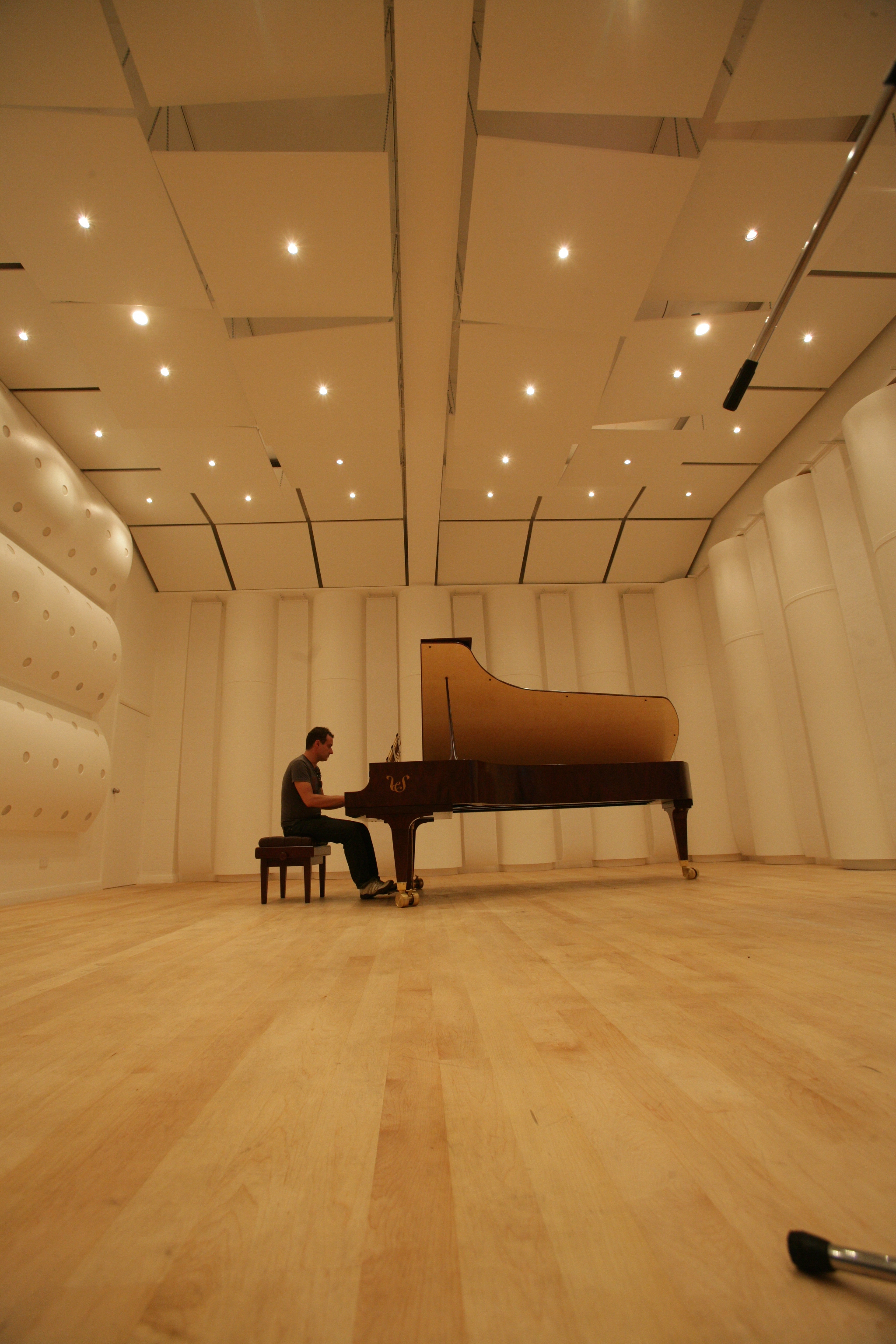

Gasser has taught masterclasses at the Sydney Conservatorium of Music, Christ's Hospital UK, Newcastle University, Australia, Hale School AU, Birmingham Conservatoire UK, Juilliard School, New York, University of Oxford UK, Australian National Academy of Music, Purcell School UK, Royal Holloway University UK, The King's School, Canterbury UK, Trinity College of Music UK, University of Cambridge, UK, Darmstadt, Germany, Central Queensland University, AU Newcastle Grammar School, Australia, Western Australian Academy of Performing Arts, City University of New York and the Conservatoire de Paris.

'Variations Serieuses' Op 54
Felix Mendelssohn
Performed live by Mark Gasser

'Impromptu in Gb Major' Op 90 No 3.
Franz Schubert
Performed live by Mark Gasser

'Notturno' Op 54 No 4 by
Edvard Grieg
Performed live by Mark Gasser

'The Queen's Dolour (A Farewell) by Henry Purcell / Realized by Ronald Stevenson (1958)
Performed live by Mark Gasser
