= Viola Sonata (Shostakovich) =

1975 sonata for viola and piano by Dmitri Shostakovich

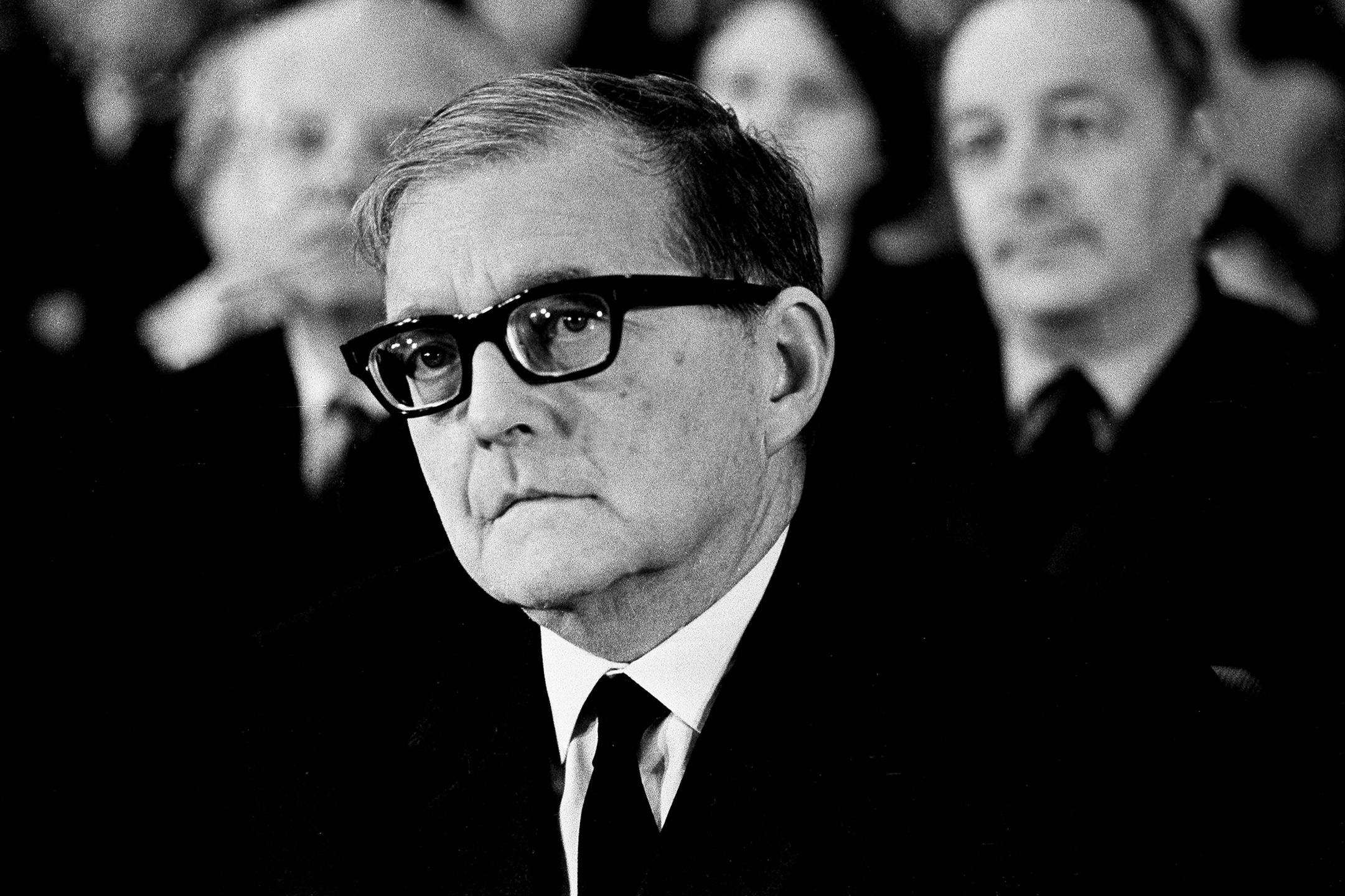
Dmitri Shostakovich in the 1970s

The Sonata for Viola and Piano, Op. 147, is the last composition by Dmitri Shostakovich. It was completed on July 5, 1975, weeks before his death. It is dedicated to Fyodor Druzhinin, violist of the Beethoven Quartet.

== Background ==
Surviving rough drafts of the sonata's first movement, which use a bass clef instead of an alto, suggest that Shostakovich may have originally conceived the work for cello. According to Sofia Khentova, the viola sonatas of Mieczysław Weinberg and Grigory Frid had been the impetus for Shostakovich to compose his own. His Viola Sonata also marked a return to an idea that the composer had expressed in the mid-1930s of writing a cycle of works for instruments not usually considered ideal for solo roles.

Shostakovich first announced his intention to compose the Viola Sonata in May 1975 to the management of Leningrad's Glinka Maly Hall. In response to their proposal for a concert that would simultaneously open its 1975–76 season and commemorate his 69th birthday, he requested a program of his sonatas for cello, violin, and viola; the latter to be completed in the summer.

On the morning of July 1, 1975, Shostakovich telephoned Druzhinin to tell him that he had an idea for a Viola Sonata. He called again later in the day asking whether certain double stops played in rapid succession were possible on the viola. Druzhinin encouraged the composer to write as he pleased and said that violists would stretch their techniques to play whatever he asked them to.

In the final days before completing the sonata, Shostakovich complained about the inability of his right hand to remain still enough for writing and had also telephoned Druzhinin on July 4 warning him that he was considering delaying further work as a result of his declining health. Despite these challenges, he announced to the violist on July 5 that he had completed the score and that it had been dispatched to the Union of Soviet Composers for copying. After unexpected delays in its preparation, Druzhinin received the fair copy of the score from the composer's wife on August 6. Shostakovich died on August 9.

== Music ==
The sonata is divided into three movements:

1. Moderato
2. Allegretto
3. Adagio

The composer described the first movement as a "novella." It begins with an unaccompanied pizzicato figure in the viola which recalls the opening of Alban Berg's Violin Concerto, followed by an austere piano line, which leads into a more animated middle section. The movement closes with a remembrance of the opening bars.

Most of the second movement's material is borrowed from Shostakovich's unfinished 1942 opera The Gamblers. After the successful 1974 revival of his other opera based on Nikolai Gogol, The Nose, he requested the return of the manuscript for The Gamblers from his former pupil Galina Ustvolskaya, to whom he had given it.

Shostakovich called the final movement an "Adagio in Memory of Beethoven" or "Adagio in Memory of a Great Composer", but emphasized that its mood was "bright and clear", calling it "radiant music". Allusions to Beethoven's "Moonlight" Sonata are juxtaposed with reminiscences of themes presented earlier in the Viola Sonata, followed by an extensive self-quotation that strings together references to each of Shostakovich's 15 symphonies. Its final pages close with quotes from Richard Strauss's Don Quixote and Shostakovich's early Suite in F♯ minor.

== Reception ==
The sonata was privately premiered at Shostakovich's apartment by Druzhinin and pianist Mikhail Muntyan on September 25, 1975, what would have been the composer's 69th birthday. Its public premiere took place at the Small Hall of the Moscow Conservatory on October 1, 1975, with the same performers. A critic for Izvestia wrote that the music was "like the catharsis in a tragedy; life, struggle, overcoming, purification by light, exit into immortality." With the approval of Shostakovich's widow, Daniil Shafran transcribed the sonata for cello and piano, an experience he later called "one of the peaks of his creative life." His transcription of the scherzo was a compulsory piece for cellists participating in the 1978 International Tchaikovsky Competition.
