= Lev Lebedinsky =

Lev Lebedinsky (1904–1992) was a Soviet musicologist.

He is perhaps most well known today as a friend and oft-quoted confidant of composer Dmitry Shostakovich. His part in the debate over Shostakovich's memoirs and musical intentions created a certain amount of conflict with the late composer's family after his death in 1975.

He is quoted, perhaps most controversially, claiming that around the time of writing his dour and autobiographical Eighth Quartet, Shostakovich was suicidal — that Lebedinsky removed a bottle of sleeping pills from the composer's pocket and gave them to Shostakovich's son, Maxim. Maxim denies this claim.

Lebedinsky's testimony is questioned by some because of his previously-held positions - as an agent for the Bolshevik secret police, Felix Dzerzhinsky’s notorious Cheka, and as a major leader of the RAPM (Russian Association of Proletarian Musicians) which officially opposed Shostakovich and other Soviet composers in the 1920s.
