= Attacco =

Short musical phrase treated as a point of imitation

In music, attacco (from Italian attaccare 'to unite, to bind together') indicates a short phrase, treated as a point of imitation; and employed, either as the subject of a fugue, as a subordinate element introduced for the purpose of increasing the interest of its development, as a leading feature in a motet, madrigal, full anthem, or other choral composition, or as a means of relieving the monotony of an otherwise too homogeneous part-song.

Attacco (It.) (Lit., a binding together.) A 'point' of imitation—that is, any short passage or figure proposed for treatment by imitation. In fugues the attacco is often made from a fragment of the subject or of the andamento, but is sometimes quite independent.

A striking instance of an attacco used as the subject of a fugue is J. S. Bach's The Well-Tempered Clavier, No. 27.

When used merely as an accessory, it almost always represents a fragment of the true subject; as in this passage from "Ye House of Gilead," from Handel's Jephtha.

In the madrigal and motet, a new attacco is usually introduced with each new paragraph of the verbal text; in the glee, properly so called, the part played by the attacco is less important; while in part-songs, its appearance as a prominent feature is still less frequent. It can, however, be found in John Wall Callcott's "Go, plaintive Breeze," in Felix Mendelssohn's four-part Lied Türkisches Schenkenlied: Setze mir nicht, du Grobian.
