= Fyodor Druzhinin =

Russian composer

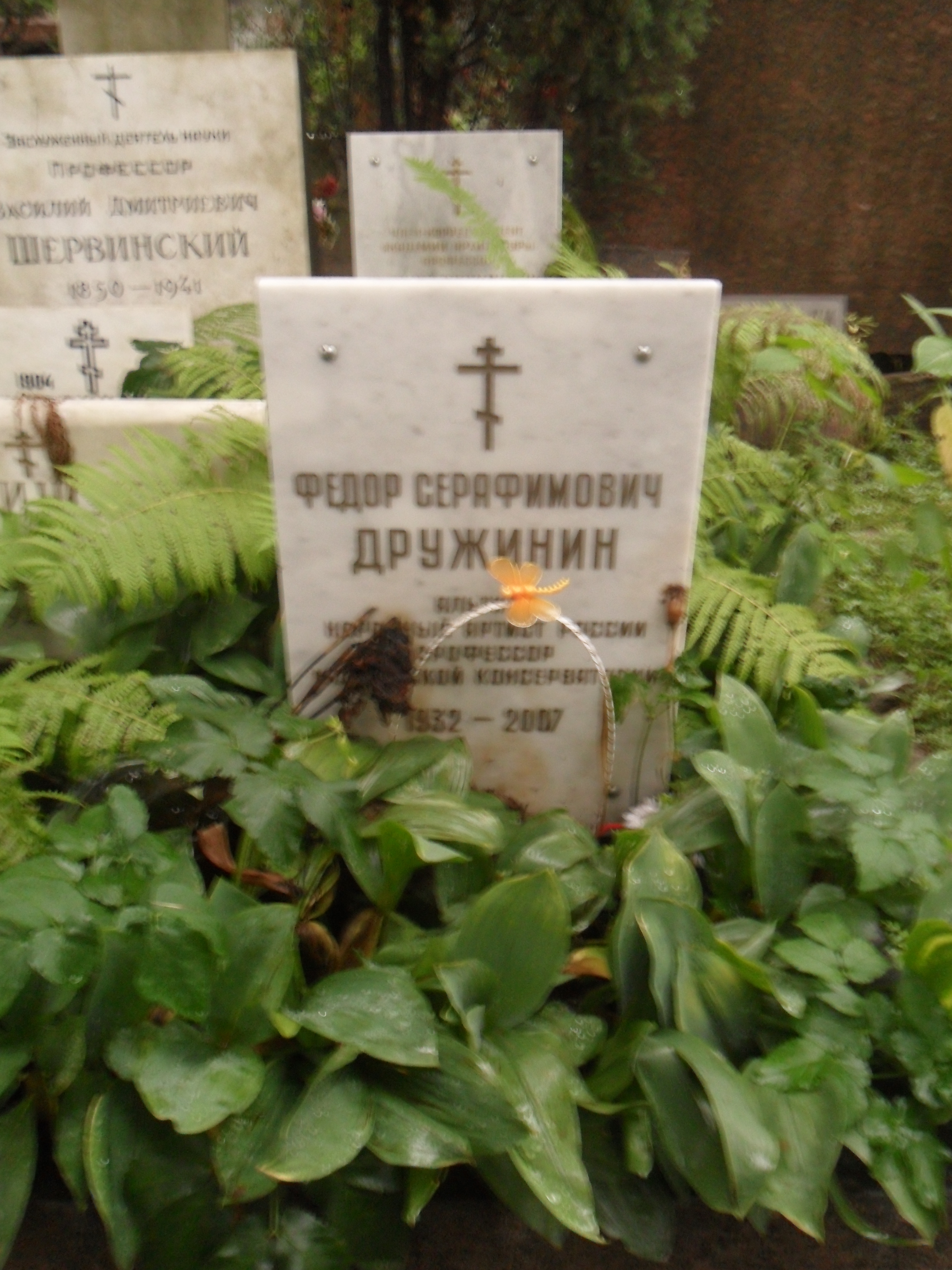
The grave of Fyodor Druzhinin

Fyodor Serafimovich Druzhinin, also Fedor, (Russian: Фёдор Серафимович Дружинин; 6 April 1932 in Moscow – 1 July 2007) was a Soviet violist, composer and music teacher.

Druzhinin studied viola at the Moscow Central Music School with Nikolai Sokolov (1944–1950) and at the Moscow Conservatory with Vadim Borisovsky (1950–1957). In 1957, he won first place at the All-Union Competition of Musicians in Moscow. He replaced Borisovsky as violist of the Beethoven Quartet in 1964.

From 1980, Druzhinin was the head of the viola department at the Moscow Conservatory. Among his students are many noted violists such as Yuri Bashmet, Yuri Tkanov, Alexander Bobrovsky and Svetlana Stepchenko.

Druzhinin composed several works for viola. His Fantasia for Viola and Orchestra is best known. He worked closely with Dmitri Shostakovich and other composers such as Mieczysław Weinberg (Moisei Samuilovich Vainberg), Alfred Schnittke, Andrei Volkonsky, Roman Ledenyov. Shostakovich wrote his last composition for Druzhinin, the Sonata for Viola and Piano, Op.147 (1975). Other dedications include Concerto-Poem (1963–1964) for viola and orchestra by Ledenyov, Viola Sonata (1971) and Viola Concerto (1972) by Grigory Frid, and Weinberg's Sonata No.1 (1971) for unaccompanied viola.

Druzhinin was a 1988 recipient of the People's Artist of Russia award. In 2001, he published his memoirs: Воспоминания. Страницы жизни и творчества (Memoirs. Pages of Life and Work). The book relates countless memories of Shostakovich, Schnittke, Igor Stravinsky, Maria Yudina, Anna Akhmatova and colleagues of the Beethoven Quartet, among others.

== Selected works ==
Original compositions

- Fantasia for viola and orchestra (1980)
- Sinfonia a due, Duet for 2 violas (published 2003)
- Sonata for viola solo (1959)
- Variations for viola solo (1968)

Transcriptions for viola and piano

- Johannes Brahms – Sapphische Ode (Ода Сафо), Op. 94 No. 4; original for voice and piano
- Frédéric Chopin – Nocturne (Ноктюрн); original for piano solo
- Edvard Grieg – Evening in the Mountains (Вечер в горах), Op. 68 No. 4; original for piano solo
- Wolfgang Amadeus Mozart – Andante from the Sonata in C Major (Анданте из сонаты до мажор)
- Hugo Wolf – Song after Konstantin G. Mostras (Песня по К. Г. Мострасу); original for voice and piano

== Discography ==
- Fyodor Druzhinin – Melodiya MEL CD 10 00867 (2004); Fyodor Druzhinin, viola; Mikhail Muntyan, piano (Glinka, Rubinstein); Larisa Panteleyeva, piano (Shostakovich)

1. Mikhail Glinka: Sonata in D Minor for Viola and Piano (1825–1828)
2. Anton Rubinstein: Sonata in F Minor for Viola and Piano, Op.49 (1855)
3. Dmitri Shostakovich: Sonata for Viola and Piano, Op.147 (1975)

- Great Artists of the Moscow Conservertoire – Moscow Conservatory SMC 036 (1998); Fedor Druzhinin, viola; Maria Yudina, Anna Levina, Larisa Panteleyeva, piano

1. C.P.E. Bach: Sonata in G Minor
2. Mikhail Glinka: Sonata in D Minor for Viola and Piano (1825–1828)
3. Arthur Honegger: Sonata for Viola and Piano, H.26 (1920)
4. Paul Hindemith: Sonata for Viola and Piano, Op.11 No.4 (1919)

- Rubinstein: Viola Sonata; Quintet for Piano & Winds – Russian Disc (1994); Fedor Druzhinin, viola; Larisa Panteleyeva, piano

1. Anton Rubinstein: Sonata in F Minor for Viola and Piano, Op.49 (1855)

- Melodiya LP 33D-025045/6 (1969); Fyodor Druzhinin, viola; Chamber Orchestra of the Moscow Conservatory, Moscow Symphonic Orchestra

1. J.C. Bach/Henri Casadesus: Concerto in C Minor for Viola and Strings
2. Roman Ledenyov: Concerto-Poem in A Minor for Viola and Orchestra, Op.13 (1963–1964)
3. Grigory Frid: Concerto for Viola and Orchestra, Op.52 (1972)

- Melodiya LP S10-08249/50 (1976); Fyodor Druzhinin, viola; Mikhail Muntyan, piano

1. Moisei Samuilovich Vainberg (Mieczysław Weinberg): Sonata No.1 for Solo Viola, Op.107 (1971)
2. Grigory Frid: Sonata for Viola and Piano, Op.62 No.1 (1971)
