= Passacaglia on DSCH =

Solo piano work by Ronald Stevenson

The Passacaglia on DSCH is a large-scale composition for solo piano by the British composer Ronald Stevenson. It was composed between 24 December 1960 and 18 May 1962, except for two sections added on the day of the first performance on 10 December 1963. The composer presented a copy of the score to Dmitri Shostakovich, its dedicatee, at the 1962 Edinburgh Festival.

== Description of form ==
The work takes the principle of the passacaglia or chaconne – namely, strict variations on an unchanging subject, usually a ground bass, and applies it across a very large single-movement structure that divides into a cumulative design of many different musical styles and forms. It is based on a 13-note 'ground' derived from the musical motif D, E-flat, C, B: the German transliteration of Dmitri Shostakovich's initials ("D. Sch."). (Shostakovich used these four notes as a musical 'signature', for example in his Eighth String Quartet).

Stevenson's work takes more than an hour and a quarter to perform. It is extraordinary in its scope, the range of its reference to historic events, and the musical influences absorbed. The work includes a sonata form first section, a suite of dances (incorporating a sarabande, jig, minuet, gavotte and polonaise), a transcription of a Scottish bagpipe Pibroch, a section entitled To Emergent Africa involving percussive effects directly on the piano strings, a section resonating to Lenin's slogan 'Peace, Bread and the Land'. The penultimate section is a huge triple fugue over the ground bass, the first fugue on a 12-note subject derived from the bass, the second combines the DSCH motif with the BACH motif (B-flat, A, C, B), and the third, on the Dies Irae chant, is inscribed In memoriam the six million (a reference to the victims of the Holocaust of World War II). The work ends with a series of variations on a theme derived from the ground marked Adagissimo barocco and organized on the principle of Baroque 'doubles', with the basic unit of metre halving with each variation.

== Structure ==
=== I Pars Prima ===
1. Sonata Allegro
2. Waltz In Rondo-Form
3. Episode 1. Presto
4. Suite:
  1. Prelude.
  2. Sarabande.
  3. Jig.
  4. Sarabande.
  5. Minuet.
  6. Jig.
  7. Gavotte.
  8. Polonaise.
5. Pibroch (Lament For Children).
6. Episode 2. Arabesque Variations.
7. Nocturne.

=== II Pars Altera ===
1. Reverie-Fantasy.
2. Fanfare.
3. Forebodings. Alarm.
4. Glimpse Of A War Vision.
5. Variations On 'Peace, Bread And The Land' (1917).
6. Symphonic March.
7. Episode 3. Volante Scherzoso.
8. Fandango.
9. Pedal Point. 'To Emergent Africa'.
10. Central Episode. Etudes.
11. Variations In C Minor

=== III Pars Tertia ===
1. Adagio. Tribute To Bach
2. Triple Fugue Over Ground Bass:
  1. Subject 1. Andamento
  2. Subject 2. Bach.
  3. Subject 3. Dies Irae
3. Final Variations On A Theme Derived From Ground (Adagissimo Barocco).

== Performances and recordings ==
The composer gave the world premiere at the University of Cape Town on 10 December 1963. In 1964 he recorded the work on a Petrof grand piano on two LPs issued under the auspices of the Editorial Board of the University of Cape Town, in a signed edition of 100 copies. (In 2008 this performance was reissued on Appian APR 5650 CD.) Stevenson also gave the work its European public premiere on 6 June 1966 as part of the Handel Festival in Halle then part of the German Democratic Republic. The first broadcast was given by John Ogdon on the BBC Third Programme on 22 May 1966, and Ogdon went on to give the British public premiere at the Aldeburgh Festival on 14 June 1966. He subsequently made a recording for EMI on two LP discs. The work has been recorded on CD by Raymond Clarke, Murray McLachlan and James Willshire as well as by the composer. It was streamed live by Igor Levit on 20 April 2020 as one of his Hauskonzerte and subsequently released as part of his album "On DSCH", released on 10 September 2021 (Sony Classical).

== Publication ==
The Passacaglia was published for sale by Oxford University Press in 1967, engraved by the Polish publishers PWM. This edition is 141 pages long. In 1994 the Ronald Stevenson Society published a facsimile edition of the composer's manuscript. This edition is 191 pages long.
