= String Quartet No. 9 (Shostakovich) =

1964 string quartet by Dmitri Shostakovich

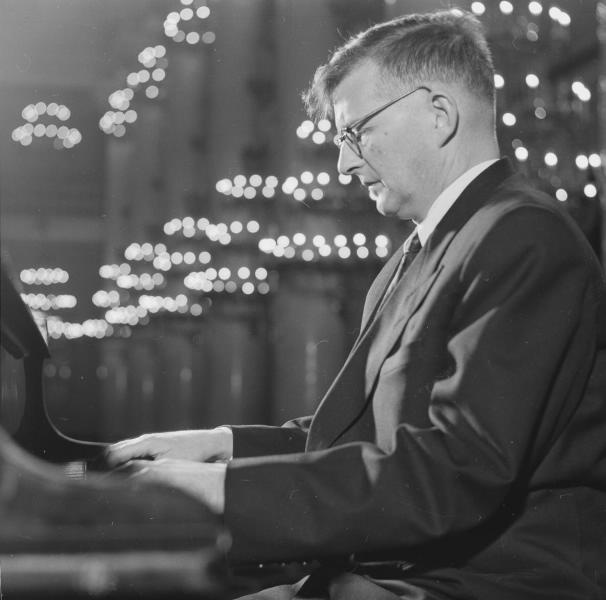
Dmitri Shostakovich playing the piano in the 1950s

Dmitri Shostakovich's String Quartet No. 9 in E♭ major, Op. 117, was composed in 1964 and premiered by the Beethoven Quartet. The Ninth Quartet was dedicated to his third wife, Irina Antonovna Shostakovich, a young editor he married in 1962.

== Background ==
The final version of the Ninth Quartet was preceded by another which Shostakovich admitted to partially destroying:

[I]n an attack of healthy self-criticism, I burnt it in the stove. This is the second such case in my creative practice. I once did a similar trick of burning my manuscripts, in 1926.

Shostakovich took three years to complete the new Ninth Quartet, finishing it on 28 May 1964. The premiere was by the Beethoven Quartet in Moscow on 20 November 1964. Dmitri Tsyganov, the first violinist, recalled that Shostakovich had told him that the first Ninth Quartet was based on "themes from childhood", and was "completely different" from the final version.

== Structure ==
The piece has five movements, played without pause:

1. Moderato con moto
2. Adagio
3. Allegretto
4. Adagio
5. Allegro

Its duration is approximately 24 minutes.
