= String Quartet No. 3 (Shostakovich) =

1946 string quartet by Dmitri Shostakovich

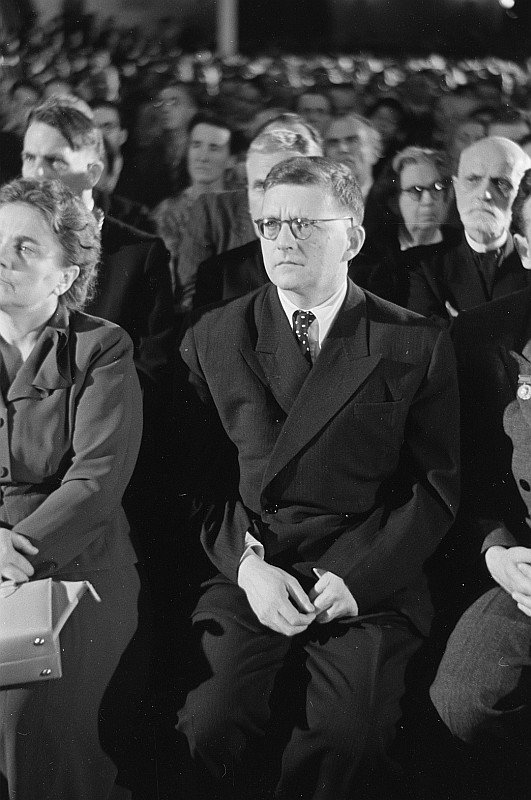
Dmitri Shostakovich in 1950

Dmitri Shostakovich's String Quartet No. 3 in F major, Op. 73, was composed in 1946. He wrote most of it between May and August of 1946 at his summer home in Kellomäki (presently known as Komarovo). The quartet was premiered in Moscow by the Beethoven Quartet, to which it is dedicated, in December 1946.

== Structure ==
The quartet has five movements:

1. Allegretto
2. Moderato con moto
3. Allegro non troppo
4. Adagio (attacca)
5. Moderato

Playing time is approximately 33 minutes.

Shostakovich originally provided programmatic subtitles for each movement, but retracted them immediately after the Beethoven Quartet's 1946 premiere. The consensus among music history scholars is that he did so because tying each movement directly to a topic was too limiting, or because of worries about backlash from Soviet society, particularly the Union of Soviet Composers. The subtitles, translated from their original Russian, are as follows:

1. Blithe ignorance of the future cataclysm
2. Rumblings of unrest and anticipation
3. Forces of war unleashed
4. In memory of the dead
5. The eternal question: why? and for what?

The first movement is in sonata allegro form. The first theme appears in the first violin in F major, accompanied by the other three instruments. It includes each of the twelve tones of the chromatic scale and is echoed by the cello. The second theme, in E minor, is stated in the first violin as well and is imitated and transformed by the second violin, viola, and cello. The development lasts over 100 measures and pulls its material mainly from the first theme, beginning with a fugue that starts with the first theme and devolves into dissonance. After a brief recapitulation, which includes the second theme not in the tonic but in B minor, the cello takes over the closing theme. The coda arrives with an acceleration and crescendo, borrowing the main theme as its material, and the movement abruptly closes with a first violin harmonic and pizzicato in the other voices.

Rudolph Barshai arranged the piece for chamber symphony (Op. 73a). It calls for flute, oboe, English horn, clarinet, bassoon, harp, and strings. It adds winds for tonal colour in the style of Shostakovich's symphonies.
