= String Quartet No. 8 (Shostakovich) =

1960 string quartet by Dmitri Shostakovich

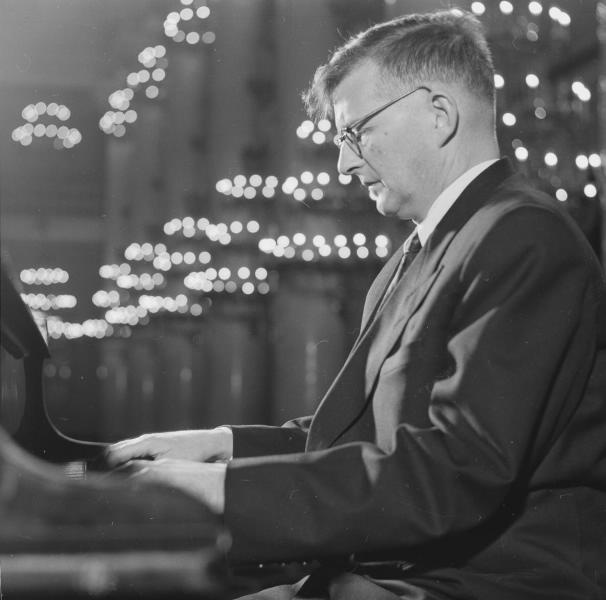
Dmitri Shostakovich playing the piano in the 1950s

Dmitri Shostakovich's String Quartet No. 8 in C minor, Op. 110, was written in three days (12–14 July 1960).

== Composition and performances ==
The piece was written shortly after Shostakovich reluctantly joined the Communist Party. According to the score, it is dedicated "to the victims of fascism and the war"; his son Maxim interprets this as a reference to the victims of all totalitarianism, while his daughter Galina says that he dedicated it to himself, and that the published dedication was imposed by Soviet authorities. Shostakovich's friend, Lev Lebedinsky, said that Shostakovich thought of the work as his epitaph and that he planned to commit suicide around this time. Peter J. Rabinowitz has also pointed to covert references to Richard Strauss's Metamorphosen in the Eighth Quartet.

The work was written in Dresden, where Shostakovich was to write music for the film Five Days, Five Nights, a joint project by Soviet and East German filmmakers about the bombing of Dresden in World War II.

The quartet was premiered in 1960 in Leningrad by the Beethoven Quartet. In the liner notes of the Borodin Quartet's 1962 recording, music critic Erik Smith writes, "The Borodin Quartet played this work to the composer at his Moscow home, hoping for his criticisms. But Shostakovich, overwhelmed by this beautiful realisation of his most personal feelings, buried his head in his hands and wept. When they had finished playing, the four musicians quietly packed up their instruments and stole out of the room."

== Music ==
The quartet is in five interconnected movements and lasts about 20 minutes:

1. Largo
2. Allegro molto
3. Allegretto
4. Largo
5. Largo

The first movement opens with the DSCH motif, Shostakovich's musical signature. This theme can also be heard in his Cello Concerto No. 1, Symphony No. 10, Violin Concerto No. 1, Symphony No. 15, and Piano Sonata No. 2. The motif is used in every movement of this quartet, and is the basis of the faster theme of the third movement.

The work is filled with quotations of other pieces by Shostakovich: the first movement quotes his Symphony No. 1 and Symphony No. 5; the second movement uses a Jewish theme first used by Shostakovich in his Piano Trio No. 2; the third movement quotes the Cello Concerto No. 1; and the fourth movement quotes the 19th century revolutionary song "Tormented by Grievous Bondage" (Замучен тяжёлой неволей Zamučen tjažóloj nevolej, by Grigori Machtet) and the aria "Seryozha, my love" from Shostakovich's opera Lady Macbeth of the Mtsensk District. The fifth contains a play upon another motif from Lady Macbeth.

Rudolf Barshai transcribed the quartet for string orchestra, in which version it is known as Chamber Symphony in C minor, Op. 110a. Boris Giltburg arranged the quartet for piano solo. Other arrangements include Lucas Drew's Sinfonia for string orchestra and Abram Stasevich's Sinfonietta for string orchestra and timpani.
