= Violin Concerto No. 1 (Shostakovich) =

1948 concerto for violin and orchestra by Dmitri Shostakovich

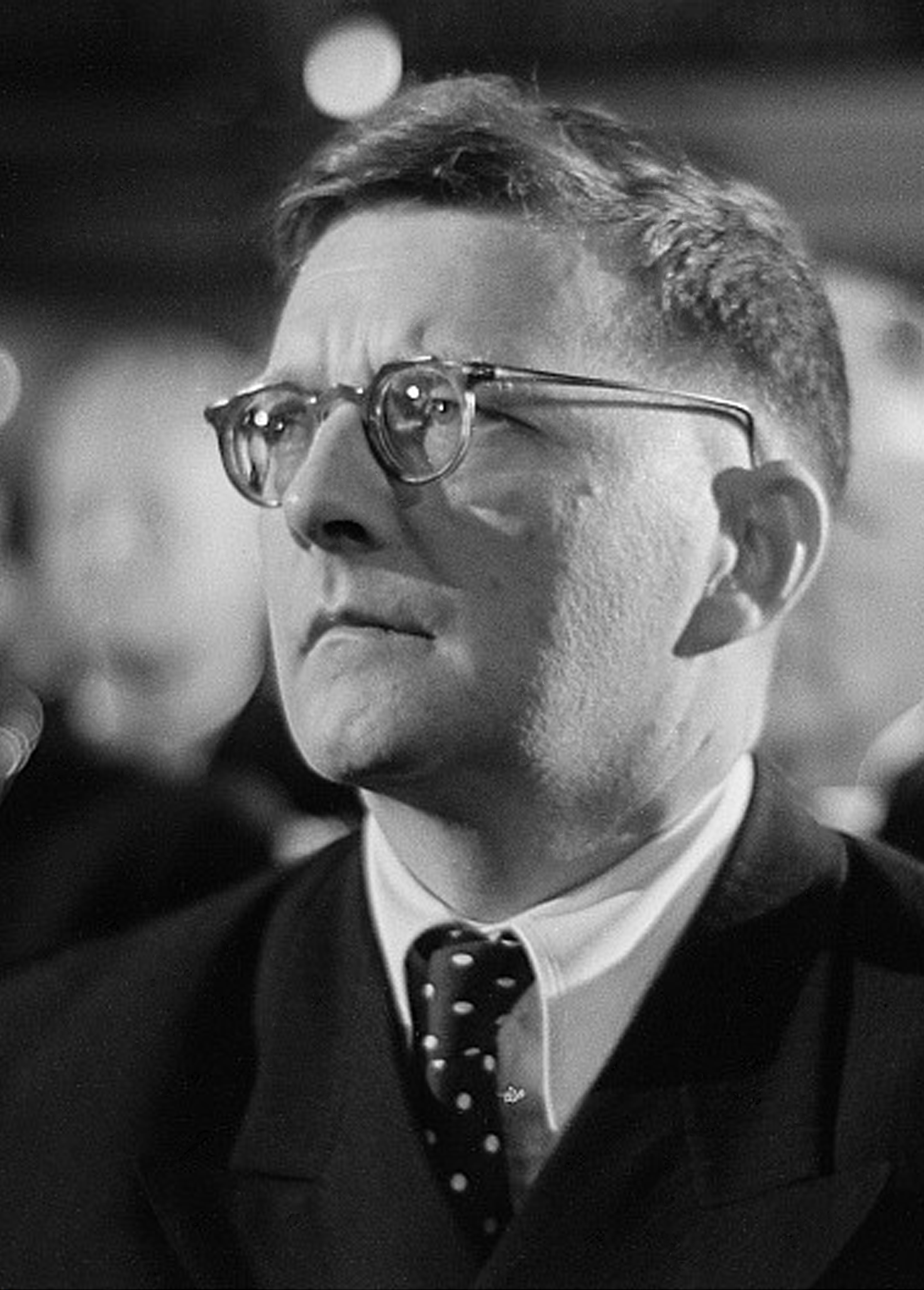
Dmitri Shostakovich in 1950

The Violin Concerto No. 1 in A minor, Op. 77 (99), was originally composed by Dmitri Shostakovich in 1947–48. He was still working on the piece at the time of the Zhdanov Doctrine, and it could not be performed in the period following the composer's denunciation. In the time between the work's initial completion and the first performance, the composer, sometimes with the collaboration of its dedicatee, David Oistrakh, worked on several revisions.

The concerto was finally premiered by the Leningrad Philharmonic under Yevgeny Mravinsky on 29 October 1955. It was received in Russia and abroad as an "extraordinary success." Oistrakh remarking on the "depth of its artistic content" and describing the violin part as a "pithy 'Shakespearian' role".

== Delay in premiere ==
Shostakovich catalogued the First Violin Concerto as Op. 77, but because of the delay in performance, he originally published it as Op. 99. Op. 77 was originally assigned to the Three Pieces for Orchestra, an unpublished and unperformed orchestral work.

== Music ==
The work is scored for solo violin, three flutes (3rd doubling piccolo), three oboes (3rd doubling cor anglais), three clarinets (3rd doubling bass clarinet), three bassoons (3rd doubling contrabassoon), four horns, tuba, timpani, tambourine, tam-tam, xylophone, celesta, two harps, and strings. Unusually, the score does not include trumpets or trombones.

The concerto lasts around 35 minutes and comprises four movements, with a cadenza linking the final two:

1. Nocturne: Moderato (A minor)
2. Scherzo: Allegro (B♭ minor → B♭ major)
3. Passacaglia: Andante – Cadenza (attacca) (F minor)
4. Burlesque: Allegro con brio – Presto (A minor → A major)

Oistrakh characterized the first movement as "a suppression of feelings", and the second movement as "demonic." The scherzo is also notable for an appearance of the DSCH motif—a motif representing Shostakovich himself that recurs in many of the composer's works. Boris Schwarz (Music and Musical Life in Soviet Russia, 1972) commented on the passacaglia's "lapidary grandeur" and the burlesque's "devil-may-care abandonment".

== Analysis ==
The First Violin Concerto was composed through the campaign against formalism in music, during which Shostakovich was among six composers censured. Because of this hostile environment, Shostakovich kept the concerto unpublished until Stalin's death in March 1953 and the thaw that followed. Music historian Boris Schwarz notes that during the post-war years, Shostakovich divided his music into two idioms. The first was "simplified and accessible to comply with Kremlin guidelines", while the second was "complex and abstract to satisfy [Shostakovich's] own artistic standards". Given its complex nature, the First Violin Concerto falls into the second category and, as such, was not premiered until 1955.

Because of the delay before its premiere, it is unknown whether or not the concerto was composed before the Tenth Symphony (1953). While the Symphony is generally thought to have been the first work that introduces Shostakovich's famous DSCH motif, it is possible that the First Violin Concerto was the first instance of the motif, where it appears in the second movement. The letters DSCH are arranged in a German 'spelling' of the composer's initials on the staff in an inversion of a [0134] tetrachord and are usually arranged as close together pitch-wise as possible. Shostakovich uses this theme in many of his works to represent himself.

The Concerto is symphonic in form, adopting the four-movement form of the symphony. The first movement, a dark, brooding, elegiac nocturne, elaborates on a fantasy form. The violin solo is prefaced by a brief orchestral interlude that proposes the melodic sentence upon which the violin solo later meditates, adding rhythmic and melodic motifs as the movement progresses. The movement starts pianissimo, and by the time it reaches its first dynamic peak, all of the featured melodic and rhythmic information has been presented.

The second movement is a fugal Scherzo, featuring uneven metric stresses set against a steady rhythmic pulse.

The Passacaglia follows, which ends with an extended cadenza that leads without pause into the Burlesque finale.

Passacaglia theme:
