= Ronald Stevenson =

Scottish composer, pianist, and writer

- Born: Ronald James Stevenson; 6 March 1928; Blackburn, Lancashire, England
- Died: 28 March 2015 (aged 87) West Linton, Scottish Borders, Scotland
- Occupations: Composer, musicologist
- Instrument: Piano

Ronald James Stevenson (6 March 1928 – 28 March 2015) was a Scottish composer, pianist, and music scholar.

== Biography ==
The son of a Scottish father and Welsh mother, Stevenson was born in Blackburn, Lancashire, in 1928. He studied at the Royal Manchester College of Music (now incorporated in the Royal Northern College of Music), studying composition with Richard Hall and piano with Iso Elinson, graduating with distinction in 1948. He married Marjorie Spedding in 1952. He moved to Scotland in the mid-1950s. As a socialist pacifist conscientious objector, he applied for exemption from National Service, but was refused recognition by the North Western Tribunal. He, in turn, refused to attend a medical examination as an essential preliminary to call-up, which led to prosecution and sentence to 12 months imprisonment in HM Prison Wormwood Scrubs. The sentence qualified him to go to the Appellate Tribunal, which finally allowed exemption from military service conditional upon work on the land.

Among his many compositions, the largest (in terms of duration) and most famous is his Passacaglia on DSCH for solo piano, written between 1960 and 1962, based on a 13-note ground bass derived from the musical motif D-E♭-C-B: the German transliteration of Dmitri Shostakovich's initials ("D. Sch."). Stevenson's work takes more than an hour and a quarter to perform and is one of the longest unbroken single movements composed for piano.

Stevenson's other works include two piano concertos, the second of which was first performed at the Proms in 1972, a violin concerto commissioned by Yehudi Menuhin, and a cello concerto in memoriam Jacqueline du Pré. He also wrote several chamber works including a String Quartet and Piano Quartet, numerous songs (among these, many settings of Robert Louis Stevenson, Hugh MacDiarmid, William Soutar and James Joyce) and works for solo piano. In 2007 he completed a choral symphony, Ben Dorain, on Hugh MacDiarmid's translation of the poem of that name by Duncan Ban MacIntyre. This work, for full chorus and chamber choir with chamber orchestra and symphony orchestra, was begun in the 1960s and laid aside for many years. The world premiere was given in City Halls, Glasgow, on 19 January 2008 by the BBC Scottish Symphony Orchestra and Chorus, with the composer present.

Stevenson was very active as a transcriber of music other than his own, chiefly for the piano, in the tradition of Ferrucio Busoni, Percy Grainger and Leopold Godowsky. His transcriptions covered composers as diverse as Henry Purcell, Frederick Delius and Bernard van Dieren. Notable examples include piano solo versions of Grainger's Hill Song No.1 (originally for wind orchestra), the first movement of Gustav Mahler's Tenth Symphony, and of the six unaccompanied violin sonatas of Eugène Ysaÿe as piano sonatas. Stevenson worked on van Dieren's String Quartet No 5 over a period of 40 years (from 1948 to 1987), transcribing it "as a piano sonata (which B.v.D. never composed)". There is also a collection of piano solos based on songs from the 19th and 20th centuries entitled L'art nouveau de chant appliqué au piano, a title that recalls deliberately the collection of song-transcriptions by Sigismond Thalberg. Stevenson made many arrangements of folk music from countries as far apart as Scotland and China, while many of his own works exist in several different instrumentations.

Stevenson was also noted as a teacher. He was senior lecturer in composition at the University of Cape Town in the mid-1960s, delivered seminars at the Juilliard School in New York, and was responsible for a course entitled The Political Piano at the University of York in the early 1980s.

Stevenson died on 28 March 2015, aged 87 at his home in West Linton, Scotland. His widow and three children survived him. His daughter Savourna Stevenson (born 1961) has recorded many works on the Scottish harp. His daughter Gerda Stevenson is a film and theatre actress, and a poet. His granddaughter Anna Wendy Stevenson is a Scots folk fiddler.

== List of works (selection only) ==
(Full list to 2005 in Symposium ed. Scott-Sutherland listed in References)

=== Orchestra ===
- Berceuse Symphonique (1951)
- Jamboree for Grainger (1960–61)
- Scots Dance Toccata (1965)
- Young Scotland Suite (1976)
- Strathclyde's Salute to Mandela for brass band (1990–91)

=== Solo instrument and orchestra ===
- Piano Concerto No.1, A Faust Triptych (1959–60; reworking of Prelude, Fugue and Fantasy for solo piano)
- Simple Variations of Purcell's 'New Scotch Tune' for clarinet and strings (1967 reworking of 1964 piano variations)
- Piano Concerto No. 2, The Continents (1970–72)
- Violin Concerto, The Gypsy (1977–79)
- Corroborree for Grainger for piano and wind band (1989 recomposition of Jamboree for Grainger)
- Cello Concerto, The Solitary Singer (1968–94)

=== Solo voice and orchestra ===
- Variations Vocalises sur deux themes de 'Les Troyens' de Berlioz for mezzo-soprano and orchestra (1969)
- St Mary's May Songs for soprano and string orchestra (1988–89)

=== Choral music ===
- The Weyvers o' Blegburn for chamber choir, texts in Lancashire dialect (1962)
- A Medieval Scottish Triptych for a cappella chorus, medieval Scottish texts (1967)
- Anns an Àirde, as an Doimhne for a cappella chorus, poems by Sorley MacLean (1968)
- 4 Peace Motets, Biblical texts (1976)
- Domino Roberto Carwor: 12-part Motet in memoriam Robert Carver, text by James Reid-Baxter (1987)
- In praise of Ben Dorain: Symphony for full chorus, chamber chorus, symphony orchestra and chamber orchestra, Gaelic text by Duncan Ban MacIntyre and translation by Hugh MacDiarmid (1962–2007)

=== Chamber and instrumental ===
- Sonata for violin and piano (1947)
- Variations on a Theme of Pizzetti for unaccompanied violin (1961; NB unrelated to piano variations, though same theme)
- 4 Meditations for string quartet (1964 arrangements of movements from A 20th-Century Music Diary for piano)
- Variations and Theme ('The Bonnie Earl o' Moray') for cello and piano (1974)
- Recitative and Air: In Memoriam Shostakovich for violin and piano (1976 arrangement of piano original; also for cello & piano, bassoon & piano, viola & piano, string quartet and string orchestra)
- Don Quixote and Sancho Panza: Duo for 2 guitars (1982–83)
- Scots Suite for unaccompanied violin (1984)
- Fantasy Quartet, Alma Alba for piano, violin, viola and cello (1985)
- Bergstimmung for horn and piano (1986)
- The Harlot's House – Dance Poem after Oscar Wilde for free-bass accordion, timpani and percussion (1988)
- String Quartet, Voces Vagabundae (1990)
- Pan-Celtic Wind Quintet (2000)
- Celtic Triptych for solo recorder (2010), dedicated to John Turner

=== Keyboard music ===
==== Piano and harp ====
- Duo Sonata (1970–71)
- Chiaroscuro: Homage to Rembrandt and his Biographer Van Loon (1987)

==== Harpsichord ====
- Sonata (1968)

==== Organ ====
- Prelude and Fugue on the 12-note theme from Liszt's Faust Symphony (1961–62)

==== Solo piano ====
- Sonatina No.1 (1945)
- 18 Variations on a Bach Chorale (1946)
- Sonatina No.2 (1947)
- Vox Stellarum (1947)
- Sonatina No.3 (1948)
- Chorale Prelude for Jean Sibelius (1948)
- Fugue on a Fragment of Chopin (1948; also version for 2 pianos)
- 3 Nativity Pieces (1949)
- Andante Sereno (1950)
- Variations on a Theme of Pizzetti (1955; NB unrelated to violin variations, though same theme)
- A 20th-Century Music Diary (1953–59)
- 6 Pensées sur des Préludes de Chopin (1959)
- Prelude, Fugue and Fantasy on Busoni's Faust (1949–59)
- Passacaglia on DSCH (1960–62)
- Simple Variations on Purcell's 'New Scotch Tune' (1964; rev and enlarged 1975 as Little Jazz Variations on Purcell's 'New Scotch Tune')
- Scottish Folk Music Settings (c. 1959–65)
- A Scottish Triptych (1959–67) (originally A Modern Scottish Triptych: consists of Keening Sang for a Makar (in memoriam Francis George Scott, Heroic Song for Hugh MacDiarmid and Chorale-Pibroch for Sorley MacLean)
- South Uist Folksong Suite (1969)
- Peter Grimes Fantasy on themes from the opera by Benjamin Britten (1971)
- 3 Scottish Ballads (1973)
- Recitative and Air (1974) (published 1976 as Recitative and Air: In Memoriam Shostakovich)
- Sonatina Serenissima (In Memoriam Benjamin Britten) (Sonatina No.4) (1973–77)
- Norse Elegy for Ella Nygard (1976–79)
- Barra Flyting Toccata (1980)
- A Rosary of Variations on Seán Ó’Riada’s Irish Folk Mass (1980)
- Symphonic Elegy for Liszt (1986)
- A Threepenny Sonatina: Homage to Kurt Weill (Sonatina No.5) (1987–88)
- Motus Perpetuus (?) Temporibus Fatalibus (1987–88)
- Beltane Bonfire (1989)
- A Carlyle Suite (1995)
- Le Festin d’Alkan: Concerto for solo piano without orchestra (1988–97)
- Fugue, Variations and Epilogue on a Theme of Bax (1982–83; 2003)

=== Song cycles ===
- 19 Songs of Innocence for four solo voices and piano with a cappella chorale, texts by William Blake (1947–8, rev. 1965)
- Four Vietnamese Miniatures for high voice and harp (or piano), texts by Ho Chi Minh (1965)
- Border Boyhood for tenor and piano, text by Hugh MacDiarmid (1970)
- The Infernal City for tenor and piano, texts by Hugh MacDiarmid and Sorley MacLean (1970–71)
- 9 Haiku for high voice and harp or piano, texts from Japanese poets (School of Bashō) translated by Keith Bosley plus one poem by Keith Bosley (1971)
- Songs of Quest for baritone and piano, texts by John Davidson (1974)
- Hills of Home for baritone and piano, texts by R. L. Stevenson (1974)
- Songs from Factories and Fields for bass-baritone and piano, texts by Hugh MacDiarmid (1977)
- Lieder ohne Buchstaben (Unspelt Songs) for tenor and piano, texts by A. D. Hope (1982)
- A Child's Garden of Verses for soprano or tenor and piano with optional treble or young soprano, texts by R. L. Stevenson (1985)

'The Queen's Dolour (A Farewell) by Henry Purcell / Realised by Ronald Stevenson (1958)
Performed live by Mark Gasser

== Sources ==
- Raymond Clarke, recording notes for Stevenson: Passacaglia on DSCH. Raymond Clarke (piano). Marco Polo 8.223545.
- Ronald Stevenson: A Musical Biography, by Malcolm MacDonald (Edinburgh, National Library of Scotland, 1989)
- Ronald Stevenson: The Man and his Music, A Symposium, edited by Colin Scott-Sutherland with a foreword by Yehudi Menuhin (London, 2005) ISBN 0-907689-40-X
