= DSCH motif =

Musical monogram of Dmitri Shostakovich

The DSCH motif, consisting of the notes D-E♭-C-B

DSCH is a musical motif used by the composer Dmitri Shostakovich to represent himself. It is a musical cryptogram in the manner of the BACH motif, consisting of the notes D, E♭, C, B♮, or in German musical notation D, Es, C, H (pronounced as "De-Es-Ce-Ha"), thus standing for the composer's initials in German transliteration: D. Sch. (Dmitri Schostakowitsch).

== Usage ==
=== By Shostakovich ===
The motif occurs in many of his works, including:

- Violin Concerto No. 1 in A minor, Op. 77
- Fugue No. 15 in D♭ major, Op. 87 (only once, in the stretto)
- String Quartet No. 5 in B♭ major, Op. 92
- Symphony No. 10 in E minor, Op. 93
- String Quartet No. 6 in G major, Op. 101 (Played all at once by the four instruments at the end of each movement)
- String Quartet No. 8 in C minor, Op. 110 (appears in every single movement)
- Symphony No. 14 in G minor, Op. 135
- Symphony No. 15 in A major, Op. 141.
- Piano Sonata No. 2 in B minor, Op. 61 (questionable)

=== By others ===
Many homages to Shostakovich (such as Schnittke's Prelude in memory of Dmitri Shostakovich or Tsintsadze's 9th String Quartet) make extensive use of the motif. The British composer Ronald Stevenson composed a large Passacaglia on it. The 2nd movement of the Percussion Concerto (2022) by American composer Danny Elfman is entitled DSCH. Also Edison Denisov dedicated some works (1969 DSCH for clarinet, trombone, cello and piano, and his 1970 saxophone sonata) to Shostakovich, by quoting the motif several times and using it as the first four notes of a twelve-tone series. Denisov was Shostakovich's protégé for a long time.

== See also ==
- Sacher hexachord

== Bibliography ==
- Brown, Stephen C., “Tracing the Origins of Shostakovich’s Musical Motto,” Intégral 20 (2006): 69–103.
- Gasser, Mark. "Ronald Stevenson, Composer-Pianist: An Exegetical Critique from a Pianistic Perspective". PhD diss. [Western Australia]: Edith Cowan University, 2013.
