= Subject (music) =

Musical melody on which a composition is based

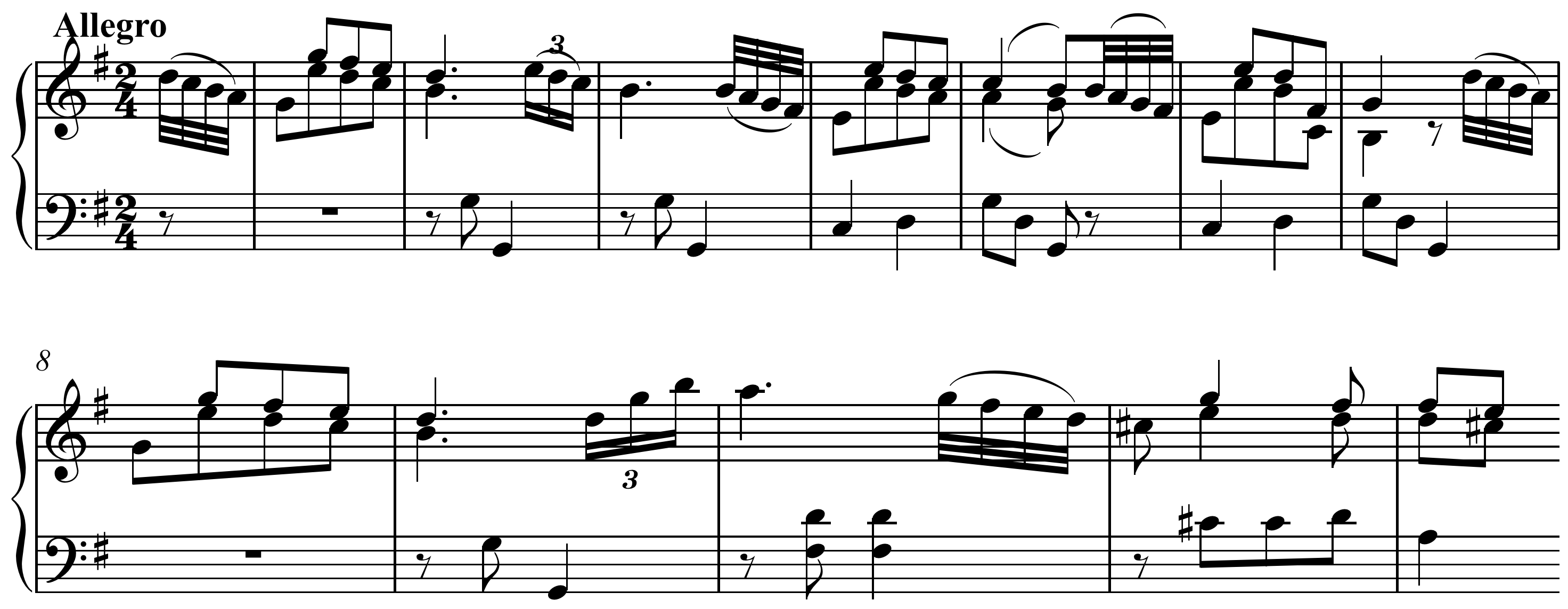
First theme of Haydn's Sonata in G Major, Hob. XVI: G1, I, mm. 1–12

In music, a subject is the material, usually a recognizable melody, upon which part or all of a composition is based. In forms other than the fugue, this may be known as the theme.

== Characteristics ==
A subject may be perceivable as a complete musical expression in itself, separate from the work in which it is found. In contrast to an idea or motif, a subject is usually a complete phrase or period. The Encyclopédie Fasquelle defines a theme (subject) as "[a]ny element, motif, or small musical piece that has given rise to some variation becomes thereby a theme".

Thematic changes and processes are often structurally important, and theorists such as Rudolph Reti have created analysis from a purely thematic perspective. Fred Lerdahl describes thematic relations as "associational" and thus outside his cognitive-based generative theory's scope of analysis.

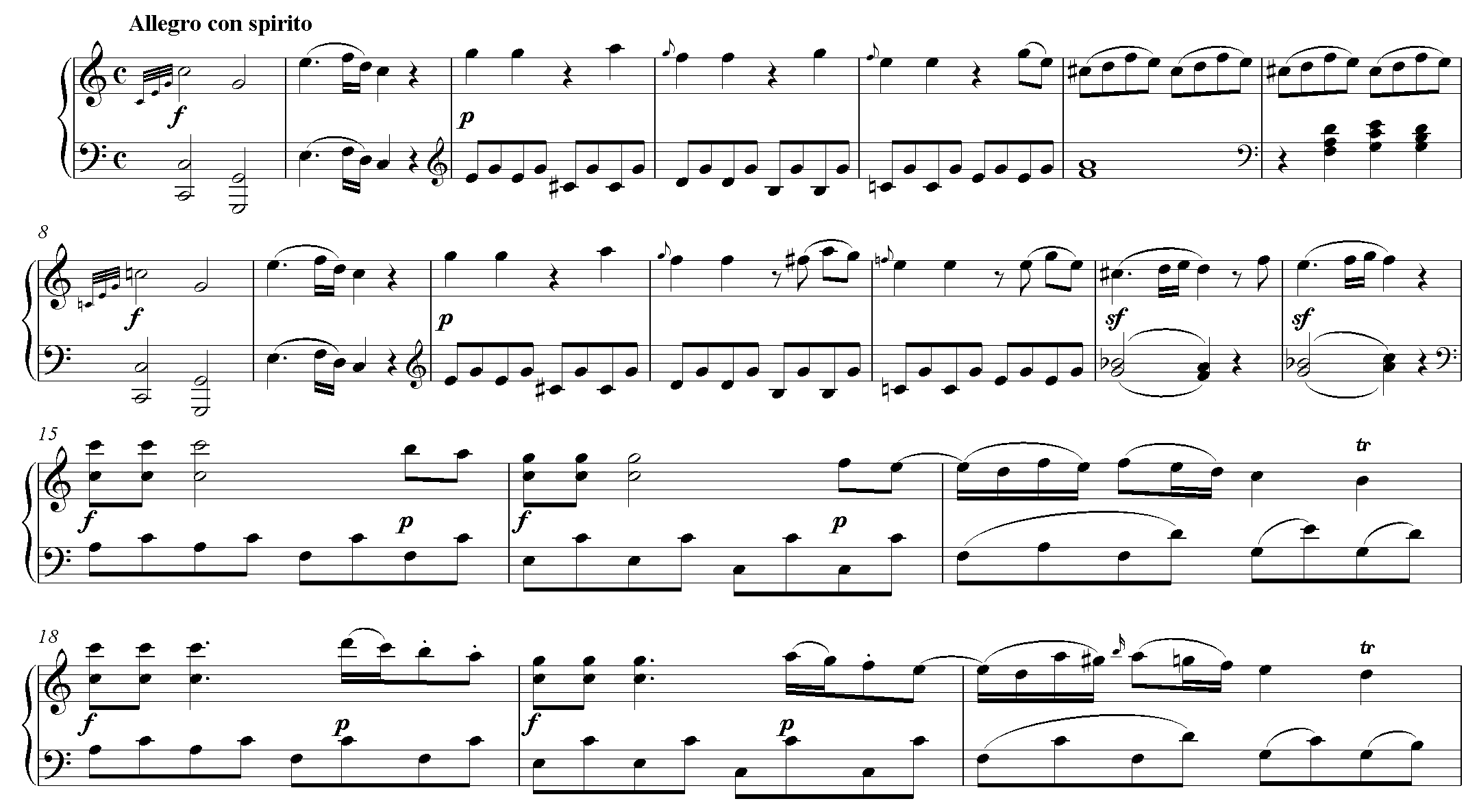
First theme of Mozart's Sonata in C major, K. 309

== In different types of music ==
Music based on a single theme is called monothematic, while music based on several themes is called polythematic. Most fugues are monothematic and most pieces in sonata form are polythematic. In the exposition of a fugue, the principal theme (usually called the subject) is announced successively in each voice – sometimes in a transposed form.

In some compositions, a principal subject is announced and then a second melody, sometimes called a countersubject or secondary theme, may occur. When one of the sections in the exposition of a sonata-form movement consists of several themes or other material, defined by function and (usually) their tonality, rather than by melodic characteristics alone, the term theme group (or subject group) is sometimes used.

Music without subjects/themes, or without recognizable, repeating, and developing subjects/themes, is called athematic. Examples include the pre-twelve-tone or early atonal works of Arnold Schoenberg, Anton Webern, Alban Berg, and Alois Hába. Schoenberg once said that, "intoxicated by the enthusiasm of having freed music from the shackles of tonality, I had thought to find further liberty of expression. In fact, I … believed that now music could renounce motivic features and remain coherent and comprehensible nevertheless". Examples by Schoenberg include Erwartung. Examples in the works of later composers include Polyphonie X and Structures I by Pierre Boulez, Sonata for Two Pianos by Karel Goeyvaerts, and Punkte by Karlheinz Stockhausen.

== Countersubject ==
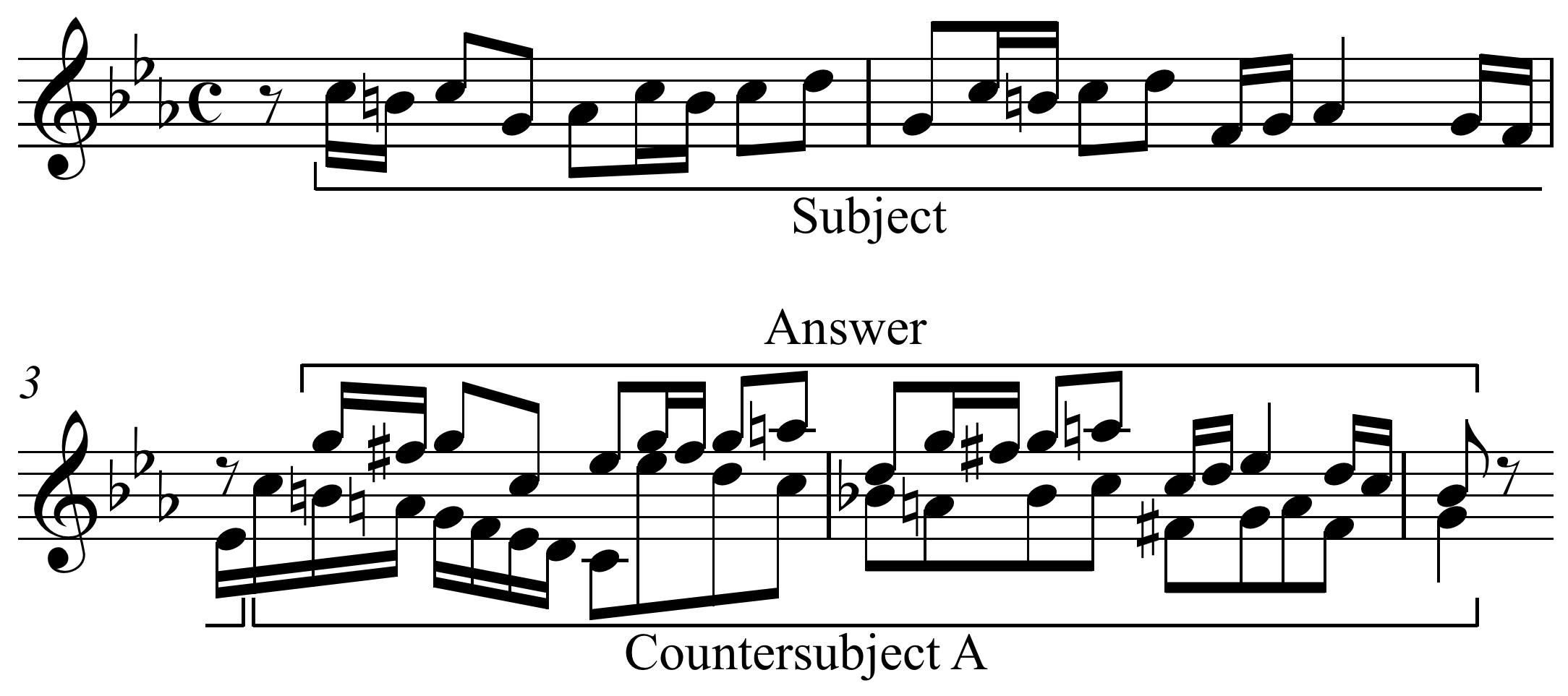
Opening of Bach's Fugue No. 2 in C minor from The Well-Tempered Clavier, Book I, BWV 847, showing the subject, answer, and countersubject

In a fugue, when the first voice has completed the subject, and the second voice is playing the answer, the first voice usually continues by playing a new theme that is called the 'countersubject'. The countersubject usually contrasts with the subject/answer phrase shape.

In a fugue, a countersubject is "the continuation of counterpoint in the voice that began with the subject", occurring against the answer. It is not usually regarded as an essential feature of fugue, however.

The typical fugue opening resembles the following:

Soprano voice:               Answer        
Alto voice:       Subject    Countersubject

Since a countersubject may be used both above and below the answer, countersubjects are usually invertible, all perfect fifths inverting to perfect fourths which required resolution.

== See also ==
- Attacco
- Cell
- Figure
- Formula composition
- Leitmotif
- Thematic transformation
