= Beethoven Quartet =

The Beethoven Quartet (Russian: Струнный квартет имени Бетховена, Strunnyĭ kvartet imeni Betkhovena) was a string quartet founded between 1922 and 1923 by graduates of the Moscow Conservatory: violinists Dmitri Tsyganov and Vasily Shirinsky, violist Vadim Borisovsky and cellist Sergei Shirinsky (half brother of Vasily). In 1931, they changed their name from the Moscow Conservatory Quartet to the Beethoven Quartet.

From 1938, it collaborated closely with the composer Dmitri Shostakovich and premiered thirteen of his fifteen string quartets, Nos. 2 through 14. He dedicated his third and fifth quartets to the Beethoven Quartet, while later quartets were dedicated individually to the members: Quartet No. 11 to the memory of Vasily Shirinsky, Quartet No. 12 to Tsyganov, Quartet No. 13 to Borisovsky, and Quartet No. 14 to Sergei Shirinsky.

Fyodor Druzhinin took over from Borisovsky in 1964, giving a runthrough of the ninth quartet with the rest of the group. Sergei Shirinsky died during rehearsals of Shostakovich's fifteenth quartet. In 1977, final founding member and first violinist Dmitri Tsyganov departed and was replaced by Oleh Krysa. The group disbanded in 1987.

== Personnel ==
Dates indicate the years of activity.

Violin I

- Dmitri Tsyganov (1923–1977)
- Oleh Krysa (1977–1990)

Violin II

- Vasily Shirinsky (1923–1965)
- Nikolai Zabavnikov (1965–1990)

Viola

- Vadim Borisovsky (1923–1964)
- Fyodor Druzhinin (1964–1988)
- Mikhail Kugel (1988–1990)

Cello

- Sergei Shirinsky (1923–1974), alternative spelling: Sergey
- Yevgeny Altman, alternative spellings: Evgeny Altman or Al'tman
- Valentin Feigin
- Urmas Tammik (1988–1990)
