= Scherzo in F-sharp minor (Shostakovich) =

Piece for orchestra by Dmitri Shostakovich

- by Dmitri Shostakovich
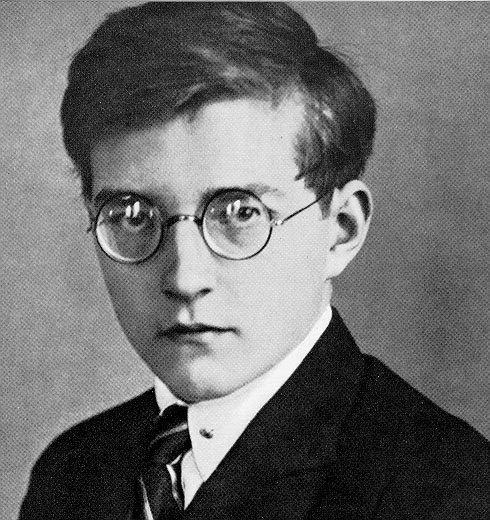
- Shostakovich in 1925
- Opus: 1
- Year: 1921 or 1922
- Composed: Petrograd Conservatory
- Dedication: Maximilian Steinberg
- Duration: 5 minutes
- Scoring: Orchestra

Scherzo in F♯ minor (Op. 1) is a piece for orchestra written by Dmitri Shostakovich (1906–1975). Shostakovich was a Russian composer and pianist during the Soviet era. It was most likely written in 1921 or 1922 while Shostakovich was studying at the Petrograd Conservatory under Maximilian Steinberg. The composition is one of the composer's earliest surviving works. Originally written as a single movement of a piano sonata, the Scherzo was later orchestrated with assistance from Steinberg and became an orchestral work in its own right.

The British premiere of the composition was played by the BBC Symphony Orchestra conducted by Mark Elder in 1996. It consists of a scherzo section, a trio, and a retransition which leads back to the scherzo theme. The piece has been described as aligning with the Rimsky-Korsakov school. A theme from the Scherzo in F♯ minor was used by Shostakovich in the 'Clockwork Doll' movement from his collection of piano pieces, Children's Notebook (Op. 69 No. 6).

== Background ==
The Scherzo in F♯ minor is one of the few surviving examples of Dmitri Shostakovich's early works, along with five of his Eight Preludes for piano. It is commonly dated as being written during the autumn or early winter months of 1919, the composer's first year at the Petrograd Conservatory (now the Saint Petersburg Conservatory), when he was aged 13. Multiple dates, however, are recorded: the Scherzo is recorded as being written in 1920 in a compilation of works entitled 'A description of the life of Dmitriy Shostakovich' (1926); another compilation entitled 'List of Shostakovich's works' (1927) dates the Scherzo as 1919–1920; Shostakovich himself cited the Scherzo's date of composition as 1919 in subsequent lists of his works. The musicologist Ol'ga Digonskaya, however, writes that it is most likely that the piece was composed in late 1921 or early 1922 when Shostakovich was almost 15. Following Digonskaya's discovery, this generally remains the accepted date of composition.

In his first or second year at the Conservatory, Shostakovich began composing a Piano Sonata in B minor. The third movement—the only surviving movement of the work—was later orchestrated and became the Scherzo in F♯ minor. Shostakovich dedicated the piece to his composition teacher Maximilian Steinberg, who had taught Shostakovich at the Conservatory and encouraged both academic and aesthetic musical appreciation. Steinberg also assisted Shostakovich with the Scherzo's orchestration.

== Form ==
Scherzo in F♯ minor is written for an orchestra similar in size and composition to those used by Brahms and Tchaikovsky. The piece is scored for piccolo, two flutes, two oboes, two A clarinets, two bassoons, four horns, two trumpets, three trombones, tuba, timpani, triangle, cymbals, bass drum, and strings. The score is separated into three sections titled 'Allegretto', 'Meno mosso', and 'Tempo I' and lasts for approximately 5 minutes.

The themes introduced in the Scherzo are structured and handled contrapuntally—which David Fanning writes is stylistically reminiscent of Steinberg. The piece begins with a scherzo section which introduces a main flute theme and a contrapuntal line played on pizzicato violins. This counterpoint idea is repeated in varying forms—including imitations and inversions—throughout the Scherzo. The piece then comes to what Fanning calls a "lyrical" trio section in D major. The music here is in a waltz metre and the themes are played in a two-against-three polyrhythm, beginning in the strings and repeated in the woodwinds and French horns. The trio is followed by a retransition, which incorporates elements of the flute and pizzicato violin counterpoint idea, and leads back to the scherzo section. Fanning writes that the retransition is "by some distance the most interesting structural initiative in the piece", as it acts as a "climax"—which a listener may have expected during the previous trio section—and a chance to develop thematic and textural ideas. The waltz theme is repeatedly stated in the brass section alongside the original scherzo contrapuntal theme from the opening. A further combination of themes is heard is the final phrase of the piece.

== Reception and legacy ==
In late 1921 or early 1922, Shostakovich played the Scherzo in F♯ minor on piano for the conductor Nikolai Malko, who described it as "an excellent piece of course work by a talented pupil—no more than that". Malko was not as impressed by the Scherzo as he was by the composer's later Symphony No. 1 (1924–1925).

Laurel Fay and David Fanning describe the composition as resembling ballet music of Tchaikovsky and Delibes, although its "flexible phrase structure" does not lend itself to dancing. Fay identifies that the work is stylistically aligned to the legacy of the Rimsky-Korsakov school. Fanning writes that the professionalism of the music, particularly its orchestration, is less impressive following the discovery that the piece was written later than previously thought.

Shostakovich used the opening theme from the Scherzo in F♯ minor in the 'Clockwork Doll' movement from his collection of piano pieces Children's Notebook (Op. 69 No. 6). Richard Louis Gillies writes that the Scherzo in F♯ minor is the first instance of Shostakovich composing in this key, which would go on to be "of particular significance" to the composer; Gillies cites 'The City Sleeps' from Seven Romances on Poems by Alexander Blok and his Suite in F♯ minor as two later examples. The British premiere of the Scherzo in F♯ minor occurred on 17 February 1996 in the Royal Festival Hall, London, performed by the BBC Symphony Orchestra conducted by Mark Elder. It was first broadcast on BBC Radio 3 in May of the same year.
