= David Zaslavsky =

Soviet journalist and propagandist

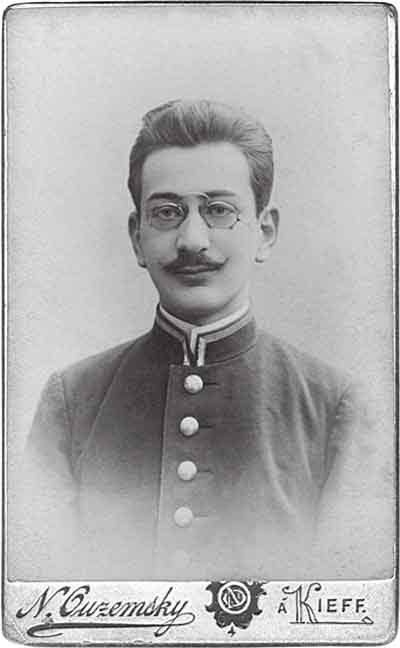
David Zaslavsky in 1912

David Iosifovich Zaslavsky (January 13, 1880 – March 28, 1965) was a Soviet journalist and literary critic. He joined the Bund (the Jewish socialist party of the Russian Empire) and initially opposed the Bolsheviks, but a few years after the latter established the Soviet Union, he became a Communist supporter.

== Zaslavsky and Shostakovich ==
After his death, Zaslavsky grew infamous for his role as a staff journalist at Pravda, the official newspaper of the Communist Party of the Soviet Union, and especially for his purported contribution to the anonymous editorial of 28 January 1936, "Muddle Instead of Music". The article condemned Dmitri Shostakovich's opera Lady Macbeth of Mtsensk for formalism, led to its removal from the stage, and even implied dire consequences for the composer unless he altered his compositional style.

Already in his (probably fabricated and unreliable) Testimony (1979), the musicologist Solomon Volkov has Shostakovich say that many believed Zaslavsky was the author of the editorial, though Shostakovich himself believed it was actually written by Stalin. Although other names circulated, further evidence emerged in support of Zaslavsky's authorship.

In 1991, the Russian musicologist Iosif Rïzhkin claimed that Zaslavsky had acknowledged writing the article. Later, in 2006, Yevgeniy Yefimov, drawing on Zaslavsky's archives, where drafts of the article and relevant diary entries were found, published additional proof of his authorship. Simon Morrison and Richard Taruskin have accepted this evidence as definitive.
