= Testimony (1987 film) =

- Directed by: Tony Palmer
- Written by: David Rudkin
- Produced by: Michael Kustow; Grahame Jennings
- Starring: Ben Kingsley; Terence Rigby; Ronald Pickup; John Shrapnel; Liza Goddard
- Cinematography: Nic Knowland
- Edited by: Tony Palmer
- Music by: Dmitri Shostakovich; London Philharmonic Orchestra
- Distributed by: Enterprise Pictures Limited
- Release date: November 11, 1987
- Running time: 157 minutes
- Country: United Kingdom
- Language: English

Testimony is a 1987 British independent musical drama film directed by Tony Palmer and starring Ben Kingsley, Sherry Baines and Robert Stephens. The film is based on the memoirs of Dmitri Shostakovich (1906–1975) as dictated in the book Testimony (edited by Solomon Volkov, ISBN 0-87910-021-4) and filmed in Panavision.

== Cast ==
- Ben Kingsley as Dmitri Shostakovich
- Sherry Baines as Nina Shostakovich
- Magdalen Asquith as Galya Shostakovich
- Mark Asquith as Maxim Shostakovich
- Terence Rigby as Joseph Stalin
- Ronald Pickup as Mikhail Tukhachevsky
- John Shrapnel as Andrei Zhdanov
- Robert Reynolds as Brutus
- Vernon Dobtcheff as Gargolovsky
- Colin Hurst as Stalin's Secretary
- Joyce Grundy as Keke Geladze
- Mark Thrippleton as Young Joseph Stalin
- Liza Goddard as The English Humanist
- Peter Woodthorpe as Alexander Glazunov
- Robert Stephens as Vsevolod Meyerhold
- William Squire as Aram Khachaturian
- Murray Melvin as The Film Editor
- Robert Urquhart as The Journalist
- Christopher Bramwell as Vanya
- Brook Williams as H. G. Wells
- Marita Phillips as Madam Lupinskaya

== Music ==
- London Philharmonic Orchestra
  - Leader: David Nolan
  - Conductor: Rudolf Barshai
- The Golden Age Singers
  - Chorus Master: Simon Preston
- Chilingirian Quartet
- Soloists
- Margaret Fingerhut
- Yuzuko Horigome
- Felicity Palmer
- Howard Shelley
- John Shirley-Quirk

== Awards ==
- Winner of the gold medal for Best Drama – New York International Film Festival
- Winner of the Fellini Prize – UNESCO
- Winner of the Critics Prize – São Paulo International Film Festival
