= Children's Notebook =

1945 piano suite by Dmitri Shostakovich

- Suite for piano by Dmitri Shostakovich
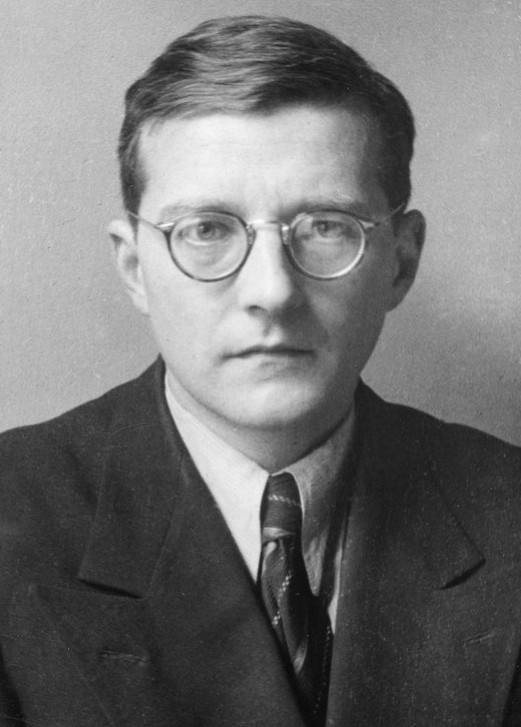
- Shostakovich in 1942
- Opus: 69
- Composed: 1944–1945
- Dedication: Galina Shostakovich
- Publisher: Muzfond; Leeds Music; Edition Peters; Muzyka; Hans Sikorski Musikverlage; DSCH Publishers
- Duration: c. 7 minutes
- Movements: 7

Premiere
- Date: December 6, 1945; May 26, 1947 (complete performance)
- Location: 1945: Moscow, Russian SFSR; 1947: Prague, Czechoslovakia
- Performers: 1945: Galina Shostakovich (No. 1) and Dmitri Shostakovich (Nos. 2 – 7); 1947: Dmitri Shosakovich (complete performance)

Children's Notebook (Russian: Детская тетрадь, romanized: Detskaya tetrad), also known as A Child's Exercise Book, Op. 69 is a suite for piano composed by Dmitri Shostakovich. Although precise dating is uncertain, it is believed to have been composed over a period of twelve to eighteen months between 1944 and 1945. Shostakovich intended it for his daughter, Galina, who at the time was a young child beginning her piano studies. Originally envisioned as a cycle of twenty-four pieces in all keys arranged along a circle of fifths, the completed work ultimately contained only seven. Each piece included a corresponding illustration by Pyotr Williams.

Galina was to have played the premiere in Moscow in 1945, but a memory lapse led to her father completing the performance. In 1947, during the Prague Spring Festival, he played the work's first integral performance, which was recorded for broadcast, and subsequently issued commercially.

== Background ==
In contrast to composers such as Béla Bartók, Dmitri Shostakovich never demonstrated an interest in teaching piano to children or composing music for pedagogical use. The impetus for the creation of the Children's Notebook was personal: it was intended for his daughter, Galina, who in 1944 was eight years old and commencing piano lessons. Her interests as an adult eventually developed away from music.

At first Shostakovich envisioned the Children's Notebook as a cycle of 24 pieces in all keys, each one succeeding the other along a circle of fifths, an idea that may have been influenced by Viktor Kosenko's Twenty-four Pieces for Children. After Shostakovich completed a piece, Galina would spend up to two months mastering it. Upon her doing so, he would compose the next piece. Each one was originally accompanied by a corresponding illustration by Pyotr Williams. The composition of Children's Notebook cannot be dated precisely, but is believed to have taken twelve to eighteen months, mostly in 1944. The final piece, "Birthday", was composed in 1945 as a present for Galina's ninth birthday.

Another Shostakovich piano work for children, "Murzilka", was composed at the same time as Children's Notebook and may have been intended for it. According to Shostakovich's original tonal plan, its key of F♯ minor suggests that it would have followed "Birthday", which is in A major.

== Music ==
Children's Notebook is intended for beginning pianists. The technical skill needed to play it is considerably less than that needed for Robert Schumann's Album für die Jugend and Pyotr Ilyich Tchaikovsky's Album pour enfants. The work builds in difficulty as it progresses. Its general expressive mood is cheerful and relaxed, contrasting with the seriousness that characterized the piano work that had preceded it, the Piano Sonata No. 2.

A typical performance of Children's Notebook takes approximately 7 minutes. The work consists of seven pieces:

Number	Title	Tempo	Tempo in Shostakovich's recording	Key	Notes
1	March	Allegretto	= 144	C major	The original sketch for this piece was notated with eighth and sixteenth notes in 2/4, rather than the quarter and eighth notes in 4/4 that appear in the final version.
2	Waltz	Moderato non troppo	. = 88	A minor	
3	Bear	Allegretto	= 144	B major	Designated "No. 5" in the manuscript fair copy.
4	Funny Story	Allegro	= 176	E minor	
5	Sad Story	Moderato	= 100	G major	Designated "No. 3" in the manuscript fair copy.
6	Clockwork Doll	Allegro	= 152	B minor	Based on a theme from the Scherzo, Op. 1.
7	Birthday	Tempo di valse	Measure 1: = 126; measure 7: . = 72	A major	The opening fanfare was reused in the Festive Overture. The music alludes to The Carnival of the Animals by Camille Saint-Saëns and The Nutcracker by Pyotr Ilyich Tchaikovsky. Shostakovich omitted the thirteen-measure coda in his recording.

=== Publication ===
Early editions of Children's Notebook starting with the first one published by Muzfond in 1945, and continuing with subsequent publications by Leeds Music, Hans Sikorski Musikverlage, and Edition Peters, only included the first six pieces. The work was finally published complete in 1983 by Muzyka in its complete works edition of Shostakovich's music.

=== Manuscript ===
The manuscripts for Children's Notebook attest to the occasional difficulty that Shostakovich had in keeping track of his own opus numbers. The copy he made for Galina's own use is marked "Op. 68", while the fair copy for publication bears "Op. 70". In Galina's copy, Children's Notebook is preceded by two pieces by Alexander Goedicke, which were copied by an unknown person. Notation was made in green ink, as well as in red and blue lead pencil. The first six pieces in the fair copy are written in black ink; the last uses blue ink. A colored pencil portrait by Williams of Galina is included on a separate page.

== Premiere ==
The premiere of Children's Notebook took place at a children's music concert organized by the Union of Soviet Composers in Moscow on December 6, 1945. Galina was to have played the entire work, but managed only to play "March":

I played the first piece without a flaw, but I stumbled on ["Waltz"]. I began again and stumbled again. At this point, father could not restrain himself and said: "She's forgotten them all... I'll finish playing them myself." And he sat in my place at the piano. I still cannot forget my embarrassment.

A complete performance by a single pianist did not occur until May 26, 1947, when Shostakovich recorded it for radio broadcast in Prague during that year's Prague Spring Festival. This recording was subsequently issued commercially on LP and CD. Shostakovich gifted a copy to Galina in 1947.

== Reception ==
Vladimir Delson, who authored a monograph on Shostakovich's piano music, called the Children's Notebook a didactic work that could be compared with those of Goedicke, Alexander Gretchaninov, and Dmitri Kabalevsky, but does not imitate them. He also praised Shostakovich for composing a work that was sincere without being condescending to children.

David Fanning said that the predominant quality of Shostakovich's recording of Children's Notebook was "throwaway impatience". He speculated that the rapid tempi and the cut in "Birthday" that the composer observed may have been made to accommodate the work on a single side of a 78 RPM record.
