= Testimony (Volkov book) =

1979 book by Solomon Volkov

- Author: Solomon Volkov (editor), Dmitri Shostakovich
- Original title: Свидетельство
- Translator: Antonina W. Bouis
- Language: Russian
- Genre: memoir
- Publisher: Harper & Row
- Publication place: United States
- English publication date: October 31, 1979
- ISBN: 978-0-87910-021-6

Testimony (Russian: Свидетельство, romanized: Svidetel'stvo) is a book that was published in October 1979 by the Russian musicologist Solomon Volkov. He claimed that it was the memoirs of the composer Dmitri Shostakovich, who had died in 1975. Since its publication, its portrayal of the composer and his views has been controversial: the Shostakovich of the book was sometimes critical of fellow composers and most notably was strongly anti-Soviet in his views. The book also contained comments on his own music, suggesting that it was intended as veiled criticism of the Soviet authorities and support for the dissident movement. The authenticity of the book is still disputed.

== Volkov's claim ==
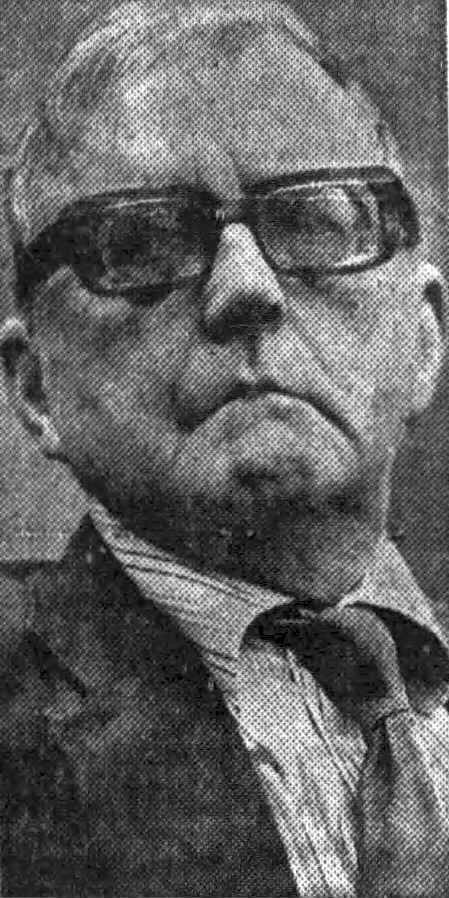
Shostakovich photographed in 1973

Volkov said that Shostakovich dictated the material in the book at a series of meetings with him between 1971 and 1974. Volkov took notes at each meeting, transcribed and edited the material, and presented it to the composer at their next meeting. Shostakovich then signed the first page of each chapter. It is difficult, without access to Volkov's original notes (claimed to be lost), to ascertain where passages attributed to Shostakovich end and Volkov's passages begin.

== Original manuscript ==
The original typescript of Testimony has never been made available for scholarly investigation. After Harper and Row photocopied it, they returned it to Volkov, who kept it in a Swiss bank until it was "sold to an anonymous private collector" in the late 1990s. Harper and Row made several changes to the published version, and illicitly circulating typescripts reflect various intermediate stages of the editorial process.

Despite being translated into 30 different languages, the Russian original has never been published. Dmitry Feofanov stated at the local meeting of the American Musicological Society in 1997, how publishing contracts customarily vest copyright and publication rights in a publisher, and not an author. Assuming that Volkov signed a standard contract, he would have no say whatsoever in whether an edition in this or that language appears; such decisions would be made by his publisher.

That was why a group of anonymous Russian translators had translated the book from English into Russian and published it online in 2009. In their foreword they wrote:

"The purpose of opening this resource is not to participate in the debate... Moreover, we never discussed this question and it is quite possible that different translators have different opinions.

"This book itself is a fact of world culture and, above all, of course, Russian culture. But people of different countries have a possibility to read it in their own languages and to have their own opinion. And only in Russia it can do only those who not only know English language, but also has the ability to get the «Testimony»: this book is in the "Lenin Library", probably exists in other major libraries. At the same time the number of interested in the question is incomparably greater than those who have access to these centers of culture...

"We've seen our task in the opportunity to make up their minds about Volkov's book to everyone who speak the same language with us, nothing more."

== Recycled material ==
Laurel Fay first raised questions regarding the book in 1980, and reiterated in 2002. She found that passages at the beginning of eight of the chapters duplicate almost verbatim material from articles published as Shostakovich's between 1932 and 1974. From the typescripts available to her, the only pages signed by Shostakovich consist entirely of this material verbatim and down to the punctuation. No other pages are signed and no other pages contain similarly recycled material. Quotations break off one word past each page break and then significantly change in tone and character (more readily apparent in the unpublished Russian). Critics of the book suggest Volkov persuaded Shostakovich to sign each page containing the composer's own material, before attaching fabricated material of Volkov's own. Irina Shostakovich has postulated on this scenario:

"Mr. Volkov brought Shostakovich a typed version of their conversations and asked him to sign every page at the bottom. It was a thin sheaf of papers, and Shostakovich, presuming he was going to see the proof sheets, did not read them. I came into Shostakovich's study as he was standing at his desk signing those pages without reading them. Mr. Volkov took the pages and left.

"I asked Shostakovich why he had been signing every page, as it seemed unusual. He replied that Mr. Volkov had told him about some new censorship rules according to which his material would not be accepted by the publishers without a signature. I later learned that Mr. Volkov had already applied for an exit visa to leave the country and was planning to use that material as soon as he was abroad."

This claim could be investigated by studying the paper leaves of the original typescript, but Volkov has strictly prohibited such an investigation.

Supporters of the book's authenticity offer two explanations for the recycled material. First, they assert Shostakovich's profound musical memory allowed him to recite long passages verbatim. Secondly, they note that not all the pages which Shostakovich signed are of recycled material. In particular, he signed the first page of the book, which contains unrecycled and controversial material, as well the first page of the third chapter.

Fay addressed the two extra signatures in her 2002 book. According to her, Shostakovich did not sign the first page of the typescript. His signature is only found on the third page, which again consists entirely of recycled material. However, when Henry Orlov examined the original manuscript in August, 1979, he stated that all the signatures were in the first pages of the chapters:

Significantly enough that, except for the inscription by his hand at the head of the eight chapters, the manuscript bears no traces of his handwriting, no alterations or even slight corrections.

Fay did not examine the original typescript but probably an edited copy distributed illicitly by the Finnish translator of Testimony, Seppo Heikinheimo.

Important also is the way Volkov claims to have assembled the manuscript. As he writes in the preface to Testimony, Volkov's interviews with Shostakovich consisted of questions to which the composer provided "brief" and "reluctant" answers, and which Volkov compiled in a "mound of shorthand notes." These fragmented notes were then "divided up [and] combined as seemed appropriate." Thus, even if we accept that Shostakovich had a photographic memory, we are still left with the notion that Volkov transcribed the composer's memories in personal shorthand, shuffled and re-shuffled these "penciled scribbles" (Volkov's term), and managed to reproduce entire paragraphs of previously published material verbatim, right down to the original typography and layout. Such things as blacked-out passages, passages pasted over, and passages covered by correction tape in the circulated and photocopied typescripts could be reconstructed or investigated by an examination of the original typescript, which has been strictly prohibited by the author.

== Shostakovich and Volkov ==
A second argument against the book concerns the claim that Volkov did not meet Shostakovich often enough to have received the material. Shostakovich's widow, Irina, has stated that Volkov met him only three or four times. His poor health at the time meant that she rarely left him, so that she would have known about any other meetings. Irina Shostakovich commented in 2000 on the plausibility of Volkov's statements about meetings between himself and Shostakovich:

"I read in a booklet that came with the phonograph record of the opera Lady Macbeth of the Mtsensk District conducted by Mstislav Rostropovich, which was released abroad, that Mr. Volkov was Shostakovich's assistant with whom he had written his memoirs. Elsewhere I read that when Shostakovich was at home alone, he would phone Mr. Volkov and they would see each other in secret.

"Only someone with rich fantasy could invent something like that; it was not true, if only because at that time Shostakovich was very ill and was never left on his own. And we lived outside Moscow at the dacha. There was no opportunity for secret meetings."

However, some other witnesses support Volkov's version. In particular, the composer's friend Flora Litvinova recalls Shostakovich saying, in reference to an unnamed Leningrad musicologist (Volkov was from Leningrad): "We now meet constantly, and I tell him everything I remember about my works and myself. He writes it down, and at a subsequent meeting I look it over."

Maxim Shostakovich has also commented on Testimony and Volkov more favourably since 1991, when the Soviet regime fell. To Allan B. Ho and Dmitry Feofanov, he confirmed that his father had told him about "meeting a young man from Leningrad [Volkov] who knows his music extremely well" and that "Volkov did meet with Shostakovich to work on his reminiscences". Maxim emphasized repeatedly: "I am a supporter both of Testimony and of Volkov."

== Reactions from Shostakovich's family and friends ==
Each side of the debate has amassed statements opposing or supporting the book's authenticity. In 1979, a letter condemning the book was signed by six of the composer's acquaintances: Veniamin Basner, Kara Karayev, Yury Levitin, Karen Khachaturian, Boris Tishchenko and Mieczysław Weinberg. Initially, the book was also criticised by the composer's son, Maxim, but later he and his sister Galina have become supporters of Volkov. Shostakovich's widow, Irina, continued to reject the book.

Supporters of the book discount the statements of those who were still in the Soviet Union as extorted or fabricated. They point to endorsements of the book by emigres and after the fall of the Soviet Union, including Maxim and Galina Shostakovich.

However, endorsing the factuality of the book does not necessarily mean endorsing it as what it claims to be, i.e., the authenticated memoirs of Dmitri Shostakovich. For instance, Maxim Shostakovich has said that the book gives a true picture of the Soviet political situation and correctly represents his father's political views, but continues to speak of the book as being "about my father, not by him".

In 1980, after he had defected from the Soviet Union, he denied the book was his father's memoirs.

Others who endorse the book are not necessarily even aware of the questions about Shostakovich's signatures raised by Laurel Fay (vide supra, Recycled material) and therefore their competence in judging the book's authenticity as Shostakovich's memoirs (as opposed to its factual authenticity) is in question. Also, they include musicians whose personal acquaintance with Shostakovich was extremely limited (e.g., Vladimir Ashkenazy).

The claim that the condemnation of the book by the six Soviet composers was extorted or fabricated is also questionable. None of the five composers who were still living in the 1990s has disassociated himself from the condemnation after the fall of the Soviet Union. Kara Karayev died in 1982, but his son Faradzh Karayev has testified in 1999 that his father had read the German translation of Testimony and told his family, "Mitya [Dmitri Shostakovich] couldn't have written this, let alone allowed its publication. It is clearly a fabrication". (This claim is also supported by Kara Karayev's diary entries from the same period.) In an article written in the same year, "The Regime and Vulgarity", Elena Basner has told that her father Veniamin Basner, Mieczysław Weinberg (both of whom died in 1996), and Boris Tishchenko were also acquainted with (and indignant about) the book before signing the condemnation.

As a translator of Testimony, the Finnish musicologist Seppo Heikinheimo had a copy of the Russian-language manuscript of Testimony in his possession and claims that he showed the text to dozens of Russian musicians, many of whom had known Shostakovich. According to Heikinheimo, Mstislav Rostropovich (in 1979) considered that Testimony is authentic, as did Rudolf Barshai, Kirill Kondrashin, Yuri Lyubimov, Gidon Kremer, Emil Gilels, and Sviatoslav Richter.

== Film ==
Testimony: The Story of Shostakovich is a 1987 British drama film based on the book and directed by Tony Palmer and starring Ben Kingsley as Shostakovich.
