= String Quartet No. 1 (Shostakovich) =

1938 quartet by Dmitri Shostakovich

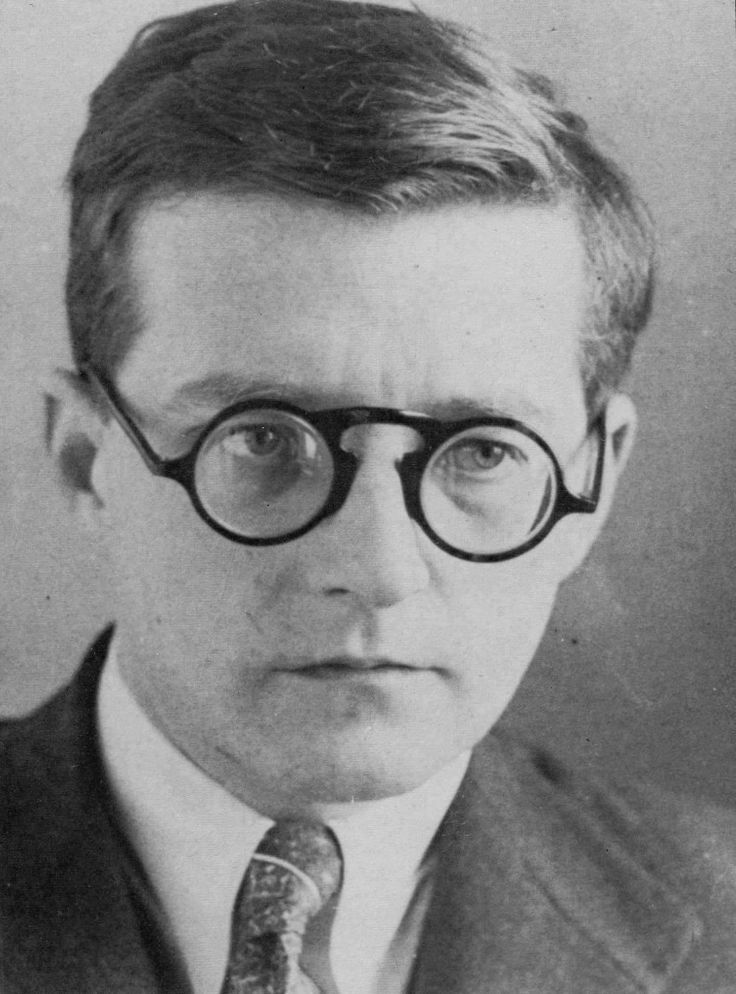
Dmitri Shostakovich before 1941

Dmitri Shostakovich's String Quartet No. 1 in C major, Op. 49, was composed in six weeks during the summer of 1938. He began to work on the quartet on the morning of May 10, 1938 (on the second birthday of his daughter, Galina). It carries no dedication. Shostakovich said that in this quartet he had "visualized childhood scenes, somewhat naïve and bright moods associated with spring."

== Premiere ==
The work was premiered in Leningrad on 10 October 1938 by the Glazunov Quartet. It was also premiered in Moscow on 16 November 1938 by the Beethoven Quartet. This premiere began a lifelong friendship between Shostakovich and the quartet.

== Structure ==
In the traditional style of a string quartet, the work has four movements:

1. Moderato
2. Moderato
3. Allegro molto
4. Allegro

Playing time is approximately 15 minutes.

=== I. Moderato ===
The first movement, in C major, is in sonata-allegro form. The exposition starts with flowing chords under an opening theme, which then moves to a contrasting second theme. After a brief development section and recapitulation, the movement comes to a close.

=== II. Moderato ===
The slow second movement, in A minor, consists of eight variations on a folk-like melody first played on the solo viola. The movement ends with a pizzicato A minor chord.

=== III. Allegro molto ===
The third movement, a scherzo, is set in the remote key of C♯ minor. It begins with a rapid theme in 3/4 time, before moving on to the trio in F♯ major which is slightly more relaxed in tempo. The scherzo is repeated again, with the coda briefly recalling the trio theme.

=== IV. Allegro ===
The last movement returns to the home key of C major.
