= Muddle Instead of Music =

Soviet editorial in Pravda

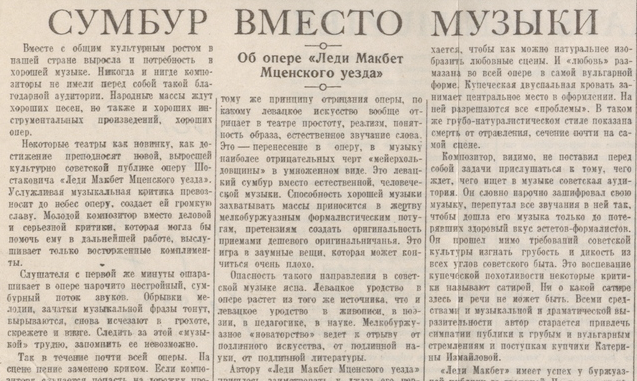
The editorial as it appeared in Pravda

"Muddle Instead of Music: On the Opera Lady Macbeth of the Mtsensk District" (Russian: Сумбур вместо музыки – Об опере «Леди Макбет Мценского уезда») is an editorial that appeared in the Soviet newspaper Pravda on 28 January 1936. The unsigned article condemned Dmitri Shostakovich's popular opera Lady Macbeth of the Mtsensk District as, among other labels, "formalist", "bourgeois", "coarse" and "vulgar". Immediately after publication rumors began to circulate that Joseph Stalin had written the opinion. While this is unlikely, it is almost certain that Stalin was aware of and agreed with the article. "Muddle Instead of Music" was a turning point in Shostakovich's career. The article has since become a well-known example of Soviet censorship of the arts.

== Background ==
=== Premiere of the opera and initial praise ===
Leningrad composer Dmitri Shostakovich completed his opera Lady Macbeth of the Mtsensk District in 1932. Set in pre-revolutionary times, Lady Macbeth deals with themes of lust, loneliness and murder. Some of its scenes are sexually explicit; a review in the New York Sun called the opera "pornophony". On 24 January 1934 the work premiered to great success, lauded by critics and government officials. Lady Macbeth quickly spread to opera houses worldwide, cementing Shostakovich's status as an international celebrity. In the Soviet Union it received instant praise. The newspaper Sovetskoe iskusstvo honored Lady Macbeth as "a triumph of musical theatre", while Sovetskaya muzyka called it "the best Soviet work, the chef-d'oeuvre of Soviet creativity". Party officials were likewise pleased, extolling the opera and terming Shostakovich "a Soviet composer brought up in the best tradition of Soviet culture". In 1934 and 1935 the opera was performed several hundred times nationwide.

=== Stalin's disapproval ===
Almost exactly two years after the opera's premiere, Shostakovich was invited to a Bolshoi Theatre performance on 26 January 1936, where he found Stalin in attendance with several associates, among them Andrei Zhdanov and Vyacheslav Molotov. Nine days prior Stalin had attended another opera, Ivan Dzerzhinsky's The Quiet Don, and had praised it as a model of socialist realism for its lyrical clarity and emotional directness. Lady Macbeth did not make the same impression on the Soviet leader. Shostakovich later wrote to his friend Ivan Sollertinsky that he witnessed Stalin cringing at loud parts of the score and laughing at sexual moments. Displeased, Stalin left after the end of the third act. A frightened Shostakovich was reportedly "white as a sheet" when he bowed for the audience. Two days later "Muddle Instead of Music" appeared on the third page of the 28 January issue of Pravda.

== The article ==
=== Content ===
"Muddle Instead of Music" begins by stressing the necessity of "good" popular music and its role in Soviet progress: "With the general cultural development of our country there grew also the necessity for good music…The people expect good songs, but also good instrumental works, and good operas." Shostakovich, it claims, failed to provide such work for an "appreciative audience". The piece calls Lady Macbeth "coarse, primitive and vulgar", a "cacophony" of "nervous, convulsive, and spasmodic music" that is little more than a "wilderness of musical chaos". Turning now to the composer himself, it admits that Shostakovich had talent but argues that he "deliberately" turned music "inside out", lamenting the lack of "simple and popular musical language accessible to all". It warns that such complexity endangers Soviet music, leaving it vulnerable to "leftist distortion", "formalism" and "petty-bourgeois 'innovation'". Lady Macbeth's success abroad was only further proof that it is an anti-Soviet opera that "tickles the perverted taste of the bourgeois". Perhaps the editorial's most dangerous pronouncement is that Shostakovich was not a class-conscious composer, rather an introspective artist who "ignored the demands of Soviet culture" and cared little for his audiences. Leaving no room for doubt about the depth of its deprecation, the editorial regrets that: "The power of good music to infect the masses has been sacrificed to a petty-bourgeois, 'formalist' attempt to create originality through cheap clowning. It is a game of clever ingenuity that may end very badly."

=== Aftermath ===
The article immediately cast Shostakovich into disgrace. Performances of Lady Macbeth dwindled rapidly until the opera was completely banned. It was last performed that year on 11 March at the Nemirovich-Danchenko Theatre in Moscow. Those who had praised it before were compelled to retract their opinions. The composer lost most of his income and commissions. Many of his colleagues in the arts community sought to dissociate themselves from him, although some, such as Isaac Babel, Abram Lezhnev and Vsevolod Meyerhold spoke out in support of Shostakovich (all three would be executed in the purges).

Shostakovich, half-finished with his Fourth Symphony, was in Arkhangelsk on a concert tour when he read the article in Pravda. Ten days later another scathing editorial appeared in the newspaper, this time about his ballet The Limpid Stream. Named "Ballet Falsehood", the piece unleashed more castigation, calling the composer a musical charlatan and a peddler of "aesthetic formalism". The ballet's librettist, Adrian Piotrovsky, was arrested and executed the next year. Though shaken by the attacks, Shostakovich continued writing his Fourth Symphony and completed it in April 1936. He booked a premiere for December and distributed the score to the Leningrad Philharmonic for rehearsals, which began in autumn. His friends expressed fear that the authorities would be angered by the work, which is influenced by Gustav Mahler (disliked by the Party) and is structurally unconventional. Late in the year Shostakovich was summoned for a meeting with a representative of the Union of Soviet Composers, who advised him to withdraw the symphony on threat of "administrative measures" for noncompliance. The composer submitted to the demands and cancelled the premiere.

Shostakovich was formally rehabilitated with the premiere of his Fifth Symphony in November 1937. Encouraged by "Muddle Instead of Music" and other slander, he simplified his music to suit the prescriptions of socialist realism. The Fifth was an official success; Party members who had attacked him before acknowledged that he had "seen his errors" and improved.

== Authorship ==
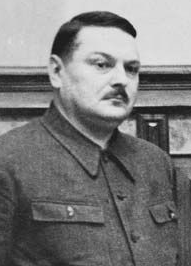
Andrei Zhdanov

It was unknown who wrote "Muddle Instead of Music", as it was common for opinion pieces and reviews to be published anonymously. Scholars have speculated about the piece's authorship. Possible candidates included Zhdanov, at the time Leningrad's Communist Party regional secretary and later head of the Propaganda and Agitation Department of the Central Committee; Boris Reznikov, another Pravda employee; Platon Kerzhentsev, a party official, playwright and journalist; and David Zaslavsky, one of Pravda's staff journalists. Rumors spread that Stalin himself had written the article, although this is now thought to be unlikely. Based on archival research of personal papers, it is now accepted that David Zaslavsky was indeed the author.

== See also ==
- Great Purge
- Anti-formalist campaign
- Mass song
- Lev Mekhlis
