= Solomon Volkov =

Soviet-born American musicologist (born 1944)

Solomon Moiseyevich Volkov (Russian: Соломон Моисеевич Волков; born 17 April 1944) is a Russian journalist and musicologist. He is best known for Testimony, which was published in 1979 following his emigration from the Soviet Union in 1976. According to him, the book was the memoir of Dmitri Shostakovich, as related to him by the composer.

== Life ==
Volkov was born in Uroteppa (Russian: Ura-Tyube, now Istaravshan), near Leninabad, Tajik SSR (today Khujand, Tajikistan). He studied violin at the Leningrad Conservatory and graduated with honors in 1967. He continued graduate work in musicology there until 1971. He also served as artistic director of the Experimental Studio of Chamber Opera.

He emigrated to the United States in June 1976. Early on, he was a research associate at the Russian Institute of Columbia University. He lives in New York City with his wife, Marianna (née Tiisnekka), a pianist and photographer. He reportedly became a United States citizen.

== Expertise ==
His primary area of expertise has been the history and aesthetics of Russian and Soviet music, as well as the psychology of musical perception and performance. He published numerous articles in scholarly and popular journals and wrote the book Young Composers of Leningrad in 1971. This book, which contained a preface by Shostakovich, was reportedly well received.

Since taking residence in the United States, he has written various articles for The New York Times, The New Republic, Musical America, The Musical Quarterly and other publications.

== Controversy over Testimony ==
Volkov's book Testimony (Russian: Свидетельство), which Volkov said represents the memoirs of Shostakovich, was published in October 1979.

Questions about Testimony's authenticity are summarized in Malcolm H. Brown's book A Shostakovich Casebook (2004), whereas a defense of the memoirs and their authenticity is presented in Allan B. Ho and Dmitry Feofanov's Shostakovich Reconsidered (1998). The latter also have written The Shostakovich Wars, a 220-page long response to Brown's Shostakovich Casebook.

Some have asserted the book's authenticity due to Shostakovich's son Maxim's alleged about-face on the accuracy of the book. After he defected to the West in 1981, he told the Sunday Times that it was a book "about my father, not by him". However, in a BBC television interview with composer Michael Berkeley on 27 September 1986, Maxim said, "It's true. It's accurate.... The basis of the book is correct." American scholar Laurel E. Fay stated that whilst Maxim said that the general context of the times and what it would have been to live as a composer under Soviet rule are generally correct, that Shostakovich's individual portrait was "grossly misconstrued".

To Dmitry Feofanov, Maxim emphasized repeatedly in 1997: "I am a supporter both of Testimony and of Volkov." Maxim also was the guest of honor at the launching of the Czech edition of the memoirs in 2005 and, with his sister Galina, contributed an introduction to the second Russian edition of Volkov's Shostakovich and Stalin in 2006, which includes the following: "We, Shostakovich's children, who watched his life pass before our eyes, express our profound gratitude to Solomon Volkov for his marvelous work, the naked truth of which will undoubtedly help our contemporaries and future generations better to see the difficult fate of our unforgettable father, and through it, better to understand his music."

Shostakovich's widow's later reaction to the book was one of skepticism: "Volkov saw Dmitrich three or maybe four times. ... He was never an intimate friend of the family — he never had dinner with us here, for instance . ... I don't see how he could have gathered enough material from Dmitrich for such a thick book." The critics of Testimony said that this further calls into question the book's authenticity. However, Volkov had a 15-year professional relationship with Dmitri Shostakovich. It started in 1960 when Volkov reviewed Shostakovich's String Quartet No. 8, and Shostakovich wrote a preface for Volkov's book Molodyye Kompozitory Leningrada ("Young Composers of Leningrad") in 1971. In addition, Irina Shostakovich is now the only member of the Shostakovich family who denounces Testimony. Son Maxim and daughter Galina endorse it.

In 1984, during an interview in Brussels for the Flemish Classical Radio (KlaRa), Yuri Ahronovich recalled that - while in Rome - he was the first who had seen Volkov's manuscript. He said : «Ich wörde sagen daß sehr viel in diesem Buch steht daß könnte sein ...» But he added that for sure there is one mistake : Volkov writes that Shostakovich didn't respect Prokofiev and vice-versa. This is not true («stimmt nicht»).

Although Volkov remains reluctant to respond to criticisms of himself and of Testimony, on February 15, 1999, he appeared with Vladimir Ashkenazy, Allan B. Ho, and Dmitry Feofanov at an open forum at the Mannes College of Music to answer questions about the memoirs. Unfortunately, none of his principal critics attended this session. Volkov provided input into the books by Ho and Feofanov.

Despite its translation into 30 different languages, the Russian original has never been published, prompting speculation from the critics that Volkov is afraid to publish it in Russian because "Anybody who has heard Dmitri Dmitrievich's living voice even once would realize right away that it is a forgery." The copyrights of Testimony, however, belong to Volkov's American publisher, and it is not up to Volkov to allow or to deny a Russian-language publication of Testimony. Moreover, Maxim and Galina Shostakovich and many others have read copies of the original Russian typescript and believe the book to be genuine. In an interview with Feofanov in 1995, Galina stated:

"I am an admirer of Volkov. There is nothing false there [in Testimony]. Definitely the style of speech is Shostakovich's — not only the choice of words, but also the way they are put together."

== Other works ==
His other books include St. Petersburg: A Cultural History (1995), Shostakovich and Stalin: The Extraordinary Relationship Between the Great Composer and the Brutal Dictator (2004), The Magical Chorus: A History of Russian Culture from Tolstoy to Solzhenitsyn (2008), and Romanov Riches: Russian Writers and Artists Under the Tsars (2011). In Russia, Solomon Volkov is also well known due to his dialogues with Joseph Brodsky, collected and published in 1998. He has also published volumes of memoirs with other major figures, including Balanchine's Tchaikovsky: Conversations with Balanchine on his Life, Ballet and Music (1985) and From Russia to the West: the Musical Memoirs and Reminiscences of Nathan Milstein (1990). In 2013, Volkov was the interviewer in a three-hour film "Dialogues with Yevtushenko", which was shown during prime time on Russian TV. In 2014, Volkov followed the film about Yevtushenko with a film about Vladimir Spivakov, a world-known Russian violinist and conductor, "Dialogues with Vladimir Spivakov". In addition to the film, Volkov wrote a book with the similar title.
