= Festive Overture =

1954 orchestral work by Dmitri Shostakovich

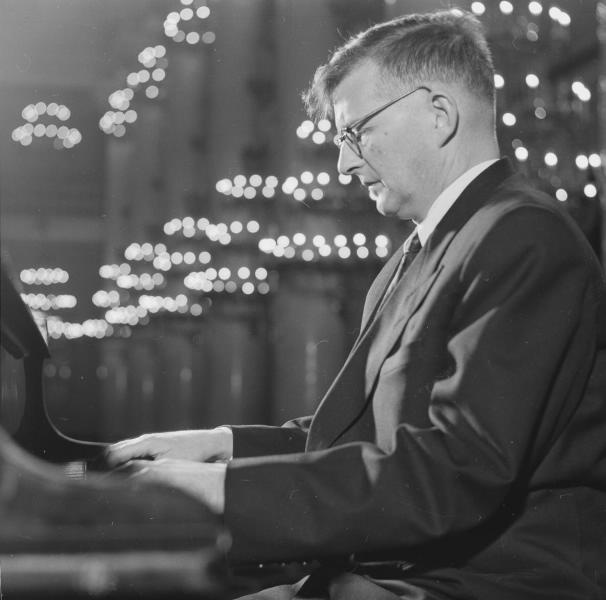
Dmitri Shostakovich playing the piano in the 1950s

The Festive Overture (Russian: Праздничная увертюра, romanized: Prazdnichnaya uvertyura), Op. 96 is an orchestral work composed by Dmitri Shostakovich in 1954. Commissioned for the Bolshoi Theatre's celebration of the 37th anniversary of the October Revolution, the score has since become one of the most enduring of Shostakovich's occasional scores.

== Background ==
At the time the Festive Overture was composed, Shostakovich was engaged with the Bolshoi Theatre as a musical consultant. According to Lev Lebedinsky, the commission resulted from an impromptu visit to the composer's apartment by Vassili Nebolsin, who came to express the Bolshoi's urgent need of a celebratory work on short notice. With only three days to meet the deadline, Shostakovich agreed to provide an appropriate work and immediately began to compose the Festive Overture. Within an hour, Nebolsin began to send couriers to the composer's apartment to pick up the score page by completed page, who then took them to the Bolshoi's music copyists in order to prepare the parts for performance. The premiere of the score took place on November 6, 1954 at the Bolshoi, with the house orchestra conducted by Alexander Melik-Pashayev.

== Instrumentation ==
Shostakovich scored the overture for one piccolo, two flutes, three oboes, three clarinets in A, two bassoons, one contrabassoon; four horns in F, three trumpets in B♭, two trombones, one bass trombone, one tuba; a percussion section with timpani, triangle, cymbals, bass drum, and snare drum; and strings. Shostakovich also includes an extra complement of brass consisting of four horns in F, three trumpets in B♭, two trombones, and one bass trombone.

== Music ==
The Festive Overture begins with a brass fanfare which later reappears before the work's coda. It was recycled from the "Birthday" movement of the Children's Notebook, Op. 69. Gerard McBurney has observed that the work's resemblance to Mikhail Glinka's overture to his opera Ruslan and Lyudmila is evidence for its use as a model for Shostakovich. Altogether the Festive Overture lasts approximately 6 minutes.

Shostakovich himself described the Festive Overture as "just a short work, festive or celebrative in spirit."

== Reception ==
Lebedinsky attended the dress rehearsals of the Festive Overture and later recalled his initial impressions of the work: "I heard this brilliant effervescent work, with its vivacious energy spilling over like uncorked champagne." Sofia Khentova wrote that in this score Shostakovich had "with his habitual sensitivity. . . grasped the timeliness and necessity of the overture as a mass, democratic genre," praising its "spectacular flash of expressiveness, festive sparkle, [and] brilliance of orchestration." The work became very popular and was often performed during commemorative events on Soviet holidays.

The Festive Overture, along with the Cello Concerto No. 1, was one of only two works which Shostakovich ever conducted himself. That performance took place at a festival devoted to his music in Gorky on November 12, 1962.

Five years after Shostakovich's death, the Festive Overture was chosen as the signature musical theme of the 1980 Summer Olympics in Moscow.
