= Symphony No. 1 (Shostakovich) =

1925 symphony by Dmitri Shostakovich

- by Dmitri Shostakovich
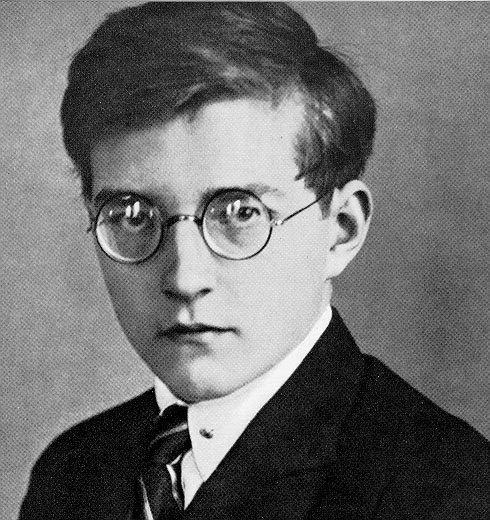
- Shostakovich in 1925
- Key: F minor
- Opus: 10
- Composed: 1924–25
- Duration: c. 30–35 minutes
- Movements: 4
- Scoring: Orchestra

Premiere
- Date: 12 May 1926
- Conductor: Nikolai Malko
- Performers: Leningrad Philharmonic Orchestra

The Symphony No. 1 in F minor, Op. 10, by Dmitri Shostakovich was written in 1924–1925, and first performed in Leningrad by the Leningrad Philharmonic under Nicolai Malko on 12 May 1926. Shostakovich wrote the work as his graduation piece at the Petrograd Conservatory, completing it at the age of nineteen.

== Structure ==
The work has four movements (the last two being played without interruption) and is approximately half an hour in length.

1. Allegretto – Allegro non troppo
2. Allegro – Meno mosso – Allegro – Meno mosso
3. Lento – Largo – Lento (attacca:)
4. Allegro molto – Lento – Allegro molto – Meno mosso – Allegro molto – Molto meno mosso – Adagio

The work begins with an introductory Allegretto section, which is developed from a duet between solo trumpet and bassoon. This leads into the first subject proper, a lively march-like Allegro reminiscent of the vaudeville and theatre music Shostakovich would have encountered during his time as a cinema pianist. The second subject is ostensibly a waltz, with the flute melody finding its way around several sections of the orchestra. The development section features a return to mock-comic grotesqueries, although the sonata-form structure of this movement is entirely conventional.

In the second movement we are presented with a 'false start' in the cellos and basses before a frantic scherzo begins with the clarinet. The piano features for the first time with rapid scalic runs before a more sombre mood develops in the Meno mosso section. Here Shostakovich writes a triple-time passage in two, with melodies being passed through the flutes, clarinets, strings, oboes, piccolos, and the clarinets again, while the strings and triangle play in the background. The bassoon brings us back to the Allegro of the opening. The climax occurs with a combination of the two melodies presented earlier in the movement followed by a coda which is announced by widely spaced chords from the piano and violin harmonics.

The third movement begins with a dark oboe solo transferring to a cello solo, and proceeds to develop into a crescendo.

There is a drum roll attacca from the third movement into the fourth. After another sombre passage, the music suddenly enters the Allegro molto section with a very fast melody on the clarinet and strings. This reaches a furious climax, after which calm descends. The following Allegro section culminates in a fortissimo timpani solo, a rhythmic motif which featured in the third movement. A passage for solo cello and muted strings cleverly uses this motif along with several other elements, leading into a coda section which ends the work with rousing fanfare-like figures from the brass.

== Instrumentation ==
The work is written for:

Woodwinds
piccolo (doubling 3rd flute)
2 flutes (with 2nd doubling 2nd piccolo)
2 oboes
2 clarinets
2 bassoons
Brass
4 horns
2 trumpets
alto trumpet
3 trombones
tuba

Percussion

timpani
bass drum
snare drum
tam-tam
cymbals
triangle
glockenspiel

Keyboard
piano

Strings
1st violins
2nd violins
violas
cellos
double basses

== Overview ==
While Shostakovich wrote this piece as his graduation exercise from Maximilian Steinberg's composition class, some of the material may have dated from considerably earlier. When the composer's aunt, Nadezhda Galli-Shohat, first heard the work at its American premiere by Leopold Stokowski and the Philadelphia Orchestra, she recognised in it many fragments she had heard young Mitya play as a child. Some of these fragments were associated with La Fontaine's retelling of Aesop's fable of The Ant and the Grasshopper and Hans Christian Andersen's The Little Mermaid.

The immediate parallel to the 19-year-old composer presenting his first symphony was Alexander Glazunov, himself a child prodigy who had his First Symphony performed at an even younger age. Glazunov may have recognised in Shostakovich an echo of his younger self. As director of the Petrograd Conservatory, Glazunov had followed Shostakovich's progress since his entrance at age 13. He also arranged for the premiere of Shostakovich's symphony, which took place 44 years after Glazunov's First Symphony had first been presented in the same hall.

This symphony was a tremendous success from its premiere. Nicolai Malko, who conducted the symphony's world premiere, said that its maturity was "impossible to deny". It displays an interesting and characteristic combination of liveliness and wit on the one hand, and drama and tragedy on the other. In some ways it is reminiscent of the works of Igor Stravinsky and Sergei Prokofiev. The transparent and chamber-like orchestration of the First Symphony is in quite a contrast to the Mahlerian orchestrations found in many of his later symphonies, and the assurance with which the composer imagines, then realises large-scale structure, is as impressive as his vigour and freshness of gesture.

== Influences ==
Because of the traditionalist mindset of the Conservatory, Shostakovich did not discover the music of Igor Stravinsky until his late teens. The effect of hearing this music was instant and radical, with Stravinsky's compositions continuing to hold a considerable influence over Shostakovich. Some critics have suggested the First Symphony was influenced by Stravinsky's Petrushka, not just due to the prominence of the piano part in its orchestration but also due to the overall tone of satire in the first half of the symphony. Because the plot in Stravinsky's ballet chronicled the doomed antics of an animated puppet, it would have reflected his observations on the mechanical aspects of human behaviour and appealed directly to the satirist in him.

Still another musical influence, suggested by the opening clarinet phrase which recurs often throughout the symphony, is Richard Strauss's tone poem Till Eulenspiegel's Merry Pranks.
