= David Fanning (musicologist) =

British musicologist (born 1955)

David Fanning (born 1955) is a professor of music at the University of Manchester. He is an expert on the music of Dmitri Shostakovich, Carl Nielsen and Soviet music. He is the author and editor of a number of books, collaborating with wife, Michelle Assay, on a book about Mieczysław Weinberg. He is also the editor of the journal Carl Nielsen Studies.

As well as being a musicologist, he is also the pianist with the Danel Quartet and a reviewer for The Daily Telegraph, Gramophone and BBC Radio 3.

Rodion Shchedrin criticized Fanning in his memoirs, referring to him as a "so-called specialist" of Soviet music.

== Major publications ==
- The Breath of the Symphonist: Shostakovich's Tenth (London, 1988) ISBN 978-0-947854-03-4
- Expressionism Reassessed, ed. (Manchester, 1994)
- Shostakovich Studies, ed. (Cambridge, 1995) ISBN 0-521-45239-2
- Nielsen Symphony No. 5 (Cambridge, 1997) ISBN 0-521-44632-5
- Nielsen Aladdin - critical edition (Copenhagen, 2000)
- Shostakovich: String Quartet No. 8 (Aldershot, 2004) ISBN 0-7546-0699-6
- Nielsen Piano Works - critical edition (Copenhagen, 2006)
- The Cambridge Companion to Shostakovich (Cambridge, 2008) ISBN 978-0-521-60315-7
- Mieczyslaw Weinberg: In search of freedom (Hofheim, 2010) ISBN 978-3-936000-91-7
- Carl Nielsen: Selected Letters and Diaries (Copenhagen, 2017) ISBN 978-87-635-4596-9
