= Galina Shostakovich =

Russian pianist and biologist (born 1936)

Galina Dmitrievna Shostakovich (Russian: Галина Дмитриевна Шостакович; born in Leningrad on 30 May 1936) is a Russian trained pianist and biologist.

== Early life ==
She is the sister of Maxim Shostakovich (born 1938) and the first child of Dmitri Shostakovich and physicist Nina Vasilyevna Varzar.

She received early training on the piano from her father. She is the dedicatee of his Children's Notebook, Op. 69, which was composed for her ninth birthday on 30 May 1945. She wanted to become a ballerina. She learned several languages. At age 11 her French already was as good as her Russian. She started studying composition with her father at an early age. Soon after the death of her mother Nina Vasilyevna Varzar (born in 1909) on 4 December 1954, Galina Shostakovich enrolled in Biology at the Moscow University where she graduated in 1959. In 1959 she married Yevgeniy Borisovich Chukovsky (1937–1997), a cinematographer and cameraman. He was the grandson of author and children's poet Korney Chukovsky and nephew of Lidiya Chukovskaya.

In a letter to his daughter on 6 August 1958, her father told her: "...Time goes by. And love in life – this is the most important thing. Besides this, it is very serious and responsible. There should always be a harmonious combination of the senses and the intellect. I really want to see your life was good, so that you are always healthy and happy. Kiss you. Dad." Her first son Andrei was born in August 1960 and her second son Nikolai in January 1962.

== Career ==
She is interviewed in the documentary from 1997 The War Symphonies: Shostakovich Against Stalin by Larry Weinstein released on 10 May 2003.
