= Maxim Shostakovich =

Russian and American conductor (born 1938)

- Максим Шостакович
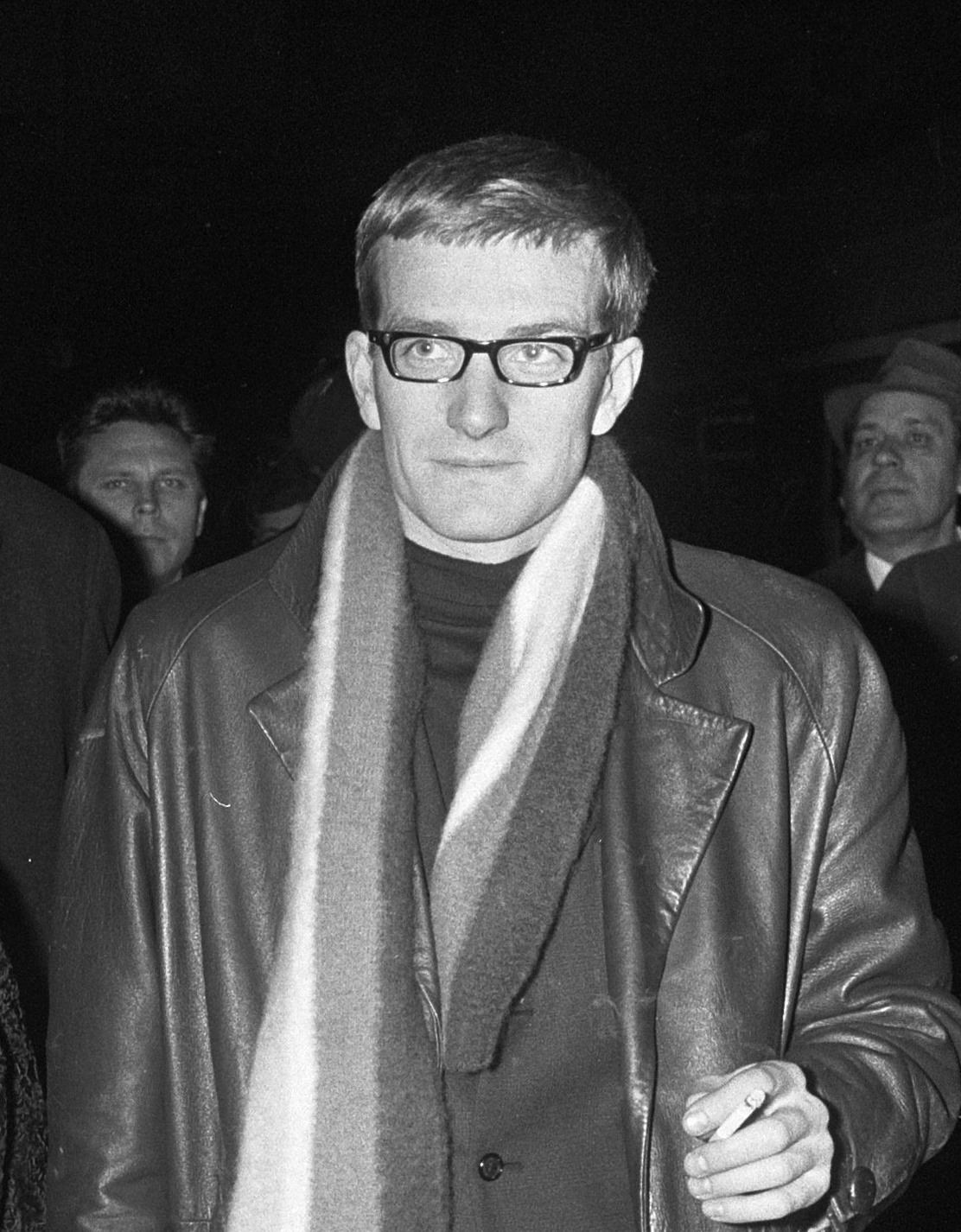
- Shostakovich in 1967
- Born: 10 May 1938 (age 88); Leningrad, Soviet Union
- Citizenship: Soviet Union (until 1991); Russia (from 1991); United States (from 1982)
- Occupations: Conductor; pianist
- Children: 3
- Father: Dmitri Shostakovich
- Relatives: Galina Shostakovich (sister)

Maxim Dmitriyevich Shostakovich (Russian: Максим Дмитриевич Шостакович; born 10 May 1938) is a Russian and American conductor and pianist. He is the second child of the composer Dmitri Shostakovich and Nina Varzar. His older sister is Galina Shostakovich. He is an Honored Artist of the RSFSR.

Since 1975, he has conducted and popularised many of his father's lesser-known works.

He was educated at the Moscow and Leningrad Conservatories, where he studied with Igor Markevitch and Otto-Werner Mueller before becoming principal conductor of the Moscow Radio Symphony Orchestra. During his tenure as principal conductor, he conducted the premiere of his father's Fifteenth Symphony on 8 January 1972.

In 1981, Shostakovich defected to West Germany and later settled in the United States. The same year, he obtained U.S. citizenship.

After spells conducting the New Orleans Symphony Orchestra and the Hong Kong Philharmonic Orchestra, Shostakovich returned to St. Petersburg. In 1992, he made an acclaimed recording of the Myaskovsky Cello Concerto with Julian Lloyd Webber and the London Symphony Orchestra for Philips Classics.

Shostakovich is the dedicatee and first performer of his father's Piano Concerto No. 2 in F Major (Op. 102).

Shostakovich has recorded a cycle of his father's 15 symphonies with the Prague Symphony Orchestra for the Czech label Supraphon.

== Personal life ==
Shostakovich has a son, Dmitri Maximovich Shostakovich (or Dmitri Shostakovich Jr.), who is a pianist.

== See also ==
- List of Eastern Bloc defectors

Preceded by Yuri Ahronovich	Principal Conductors, State Symphony Capella of Russia; 1971–1981	Succeeded by Gennady Rozhdestvensky
