= Dmitri Shostakovich =

Soviet composer and pianist (1906–1975)

- Дмитрий Шостакович
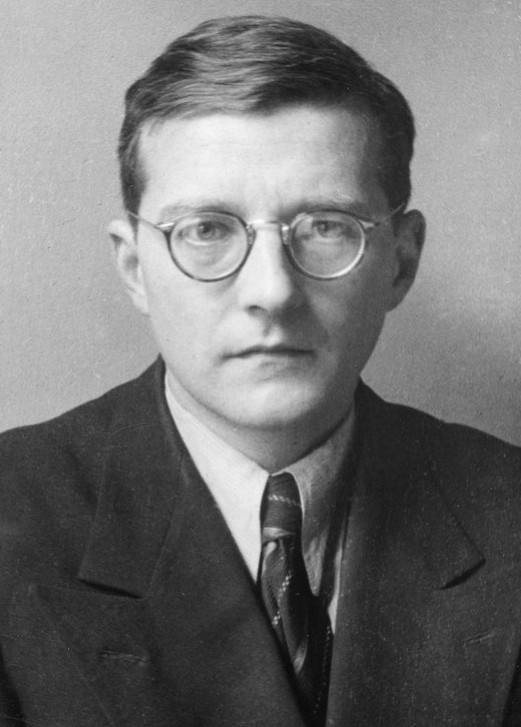
- Shostakovich in 1942
- Born: 25 September 1906; Saint Petersburg, Russia
- Died: 9 August 1975 (aged 68); Moscow, Soviet Union
- Occupations: Composer; pianist; teacher
- Works: List of compositions
- Spouses: Nina Varzar (m. 1932; died 1954) Margarita Kainova (m. 1956; div. 1959) Irina Supinskaya (m. 1962)
- Children: Galina; Maxim
- Shostakovich's voice Recorded 1941

Dmitri Dmitriyevich Shostakovich (Note: /ˌʃɒstəˈkoʊvɪtʃ/ SHOST-ə-KOH-vitch; Russian: Дмитрий Дмитриевич Шостакович, IPA: [ˈdmʲitrʲɪj ˈdmʲitrʲɪjɪvʲɪtɕ ʂəstɐˈkovʲɪtɕ]) (Note: In this name that follows East Slavic naming customs, the patronymic is Dmitriyevich and the family name is Shostakovich.) (25 September [O.S. 12 September] 1906 – 9 August 1975) was a Soviet-era Russian composer and pianist who became internationally known after the premiere of his First Symphony in 1926 and thereafter was regarded as a major composer.

Shostakovich achieved early fame in the Soviet Union, but had a complex relationship with its government. His 1934 opera Lady Macbeth of Mtsensk was initially a success but later condemned by the Soviet government, putting his career at risk. In 1948, his work was denounced under the Zhdanov Doctrine, with professional consequences lasting several years. Even after his censure was rescinded in 1956, performances of his music were occasionally subject to state interventions, as with his Thirteenth Symphony (1962). Nevertheless, Shostakovich was a member of the Supreme Soviet of the RSFSR (1947) and the Supreme Soviet of the Soviet Union (from 1962 until his death), as well as chairman of the RSFSR Union of Composers (1960–1968). Over the course of his career, he earned several important awards, including the Order of Lenin, from the Soviet government.

Shostakovich combined various musical techniques in his works. His music is characterized by sharp contrasts, elements of the grotesque, and ambivalent tonality; he was also heavily influenced by neoclassicism and by the music of Gustav Mahler. His orchestral works include 15 symphonies and six concerti (two each for piano, violin, and cello). His chamber works include 15 string quartets, a piano quintet, and two piano trios. His solo piano works include two sonatas, an early set of 24 preludes, and a later set of 24 preludes and fugues. Stage works include three completed operas and three ballets. Shostakovich also wrote several song cycles and a substantial quantity of music for theatre and film.

Shostakovich's reputation has continued to grow after his death. Scholarly interest has increased significantly since the late 20th century, including considerable debate about the relationship between his music and his attitudes toward the Soviet government.

== Biography ==
=== Youth ===
Dmitri Dmitriyevich Shostakovich was born on 25 September [O.S. 12 September] 1906 on Podolskaya Street in Saint Petersburg, then the capital of the Russian Empire. He was the second of three children born to Dmitri Boleslavovich Shostakovich and Sofiya Vasilievna Kokoulina. Shostakovich's immediate forebears came from Siberia, but his paternal grandfather, Bolesław Szostakowicz, was of Polish and Lithuanian descent, tracing his family roots to the region of the town of Vileyka. A Polish revolutionary in the January Uprising of 1863–1864, Szostakowicz was exiled to Narym in 1866 in the crackdown that followed Dmitry Karakozov's assassination attempt on Tsar Alexander II. When his term of exile ended, Szostakowicz decided to remain in Siberia. He eventually became a successful banker in Irkutsk and raised a large family. His son Dmitri Boleslavovich was born in Narym in 1875 and studied physics and mathematics at Saint Petersburg State University, graduating in 1899. He then went to work as an engineer under Dmitri Mendeleev at the Bureau of Weights and Measures in Saint Petersburg. In 1903, he married another Siberian immigrant to the capital, Sofiya, one of six children born to a Siberian Russian.

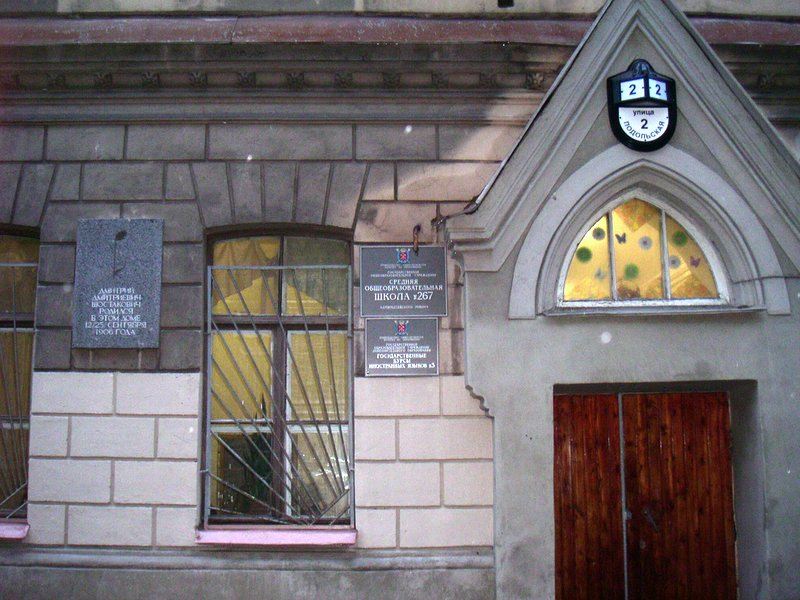
Birthplace of Shostakovich (now School No. 267). Commemorative plaque at left.

Shostakovich displayed musical talent after beginning piano lessons with his mother at the age of nine. On several occasions, he displayed a remarkable ability to remember what his mother had played at the previous lesson, and would get "caught in the act" of pretending to read the score in front of him while actually reproducing it from memory. In 1918, he wrote a funeral march in memory of two leaders of the Kadet Party murdered by Bolshevik sailors.

In 1919, Shostakovich was admitted to the Petrograd Conservatory, then headed by Alexander Glazunov, who monitored his progress closely and promoted him. Shostakovich studied piano with Leonid Nikolayev and Elena Rozanova, composition with Maximilian Steinberg, and counterpoint and fugue with Nikolay Sokolov, who became his friend. He also attended Alexander Ossovsky's music history classes. In 1925, he enrolled in the conducting classes of Nikolai Malko, where he conducted the conservatory orchestra in a private performance of Beethoven's First Symphony. According to the recollections of the composer's classmate, Valerian Bogdanov-Berezhovsky:

Shostakovich stood at the podium, played with his hair and jacket cuffs, looked around at the hushed teenagers with instruments at the ready and raised the baton. ... He neither stopped the orchestra, nor made any remarks; he focused his entire attention on aspects of tempi and dynamics, which were very clearly displayed in his gestures. The contrasts between the "Adagio molto" of the introduction and "Allegro con brio" first theme were quite striking, as were those between the percussive accents of the chords (woodwinds, French horns, pizzicato strings) and the momentarily extended piano in the introduction following them. In the character given to the pattern of the first theme, I recall, there was both vigorous striving and lightness; in the bass part there was an emphasized pliancy of tenderly threaded articulation. ... Moments of these sorts ... were discoveries of an improvised order, born from an intuitively refined understanding of the character of a piece and the elements of musical imagery embedded in it. And the players enjoyed it.

On 20 March 1925, Shostakovich's music was played in Moscow for the first time, in a program that also included works by his friend Vissarion Shebalin. To the composer's disappointment, the critics and public there received his music coolly. During his visit to Moscow, Mikhail Kvadri introduced him to Mikhail Tukhachevsky, who helped the composer find accommodation and work there, and sent a driver to take him to a concert in "a very stylish automobile".

Shostakovich's musical breakthrough was the First Symphony, written as his graduation piece at the age of 19. Initially Shostakovich aspired to perform it only privately with the conservatory orchestra, and prepared to conduct the scherzo himself. By late 1925, Malko had agreed to conduct its premiere with the Leningrad Philharmonic Orchestra after Steinberg and Shostakovich's friend Boleslav Yavorsky brought the symphony to his attention. On 12 May 1926, Malko led the premiere of the symphony; the audience received it enthusiastically, demanding an encore of the scherzo. Thereafter, Shostakovich regularly celebrated the date of his symphonic debut.

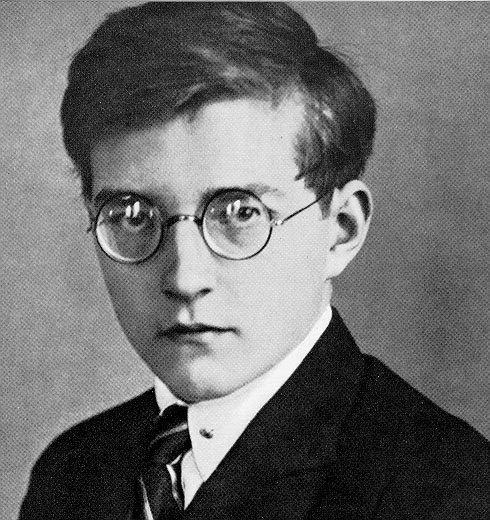
Shostakovich in 1925

=== Early career ===
After graduation, Shostakovich embarked on a dual career as concert pianist and composer, but his dry keyboard style was often criticized. Shostakovich maintained a heavy performance schedule until 1930; after 1933 he performed only his own compositions. Along with Yuri Bryushkov, Grigory Ginzburg, Lev Oborin, and Josif Shvarts, he was among the Soviet contestants in the inaugural I International Chopin Piano Competition in Warsaw in 1927. Bogdanov-Berezhovsky later remembered:

The self-discipline with which the young Shostakovich prepared for the 1927 [Chopin] Competition was astonishing. For three weeks, he locked himself away at home, practicing for hours at a time, having postponed his composing, and given up trips to the theatre and visits with friends. Even more startling was the result of this seclusion. Of course, prior to this time, he had played superbly and occasioned Glazunov's now famous glowing reports. But during those days, his pianism, sharply idiosyncratic and rhythmically impulsive, multi-timbered yet graphically defined, emerged in its concentrated form.

Natan Perelman, who heard Shostakovich play his Chopin programs before he went to Warsaw, said that his "anti-sentimental" playing, which eschewed rubato and extreme dynamic contrasts, was unlike anything he had ever heard. Arnold Alschwang called Shostakovich's playing "profound and lacking any salon-like mannerisms".

Shostakovich was stricken with appendicitis on the opening day of the competition, but his condition improved by the time of his first performance on 27 January 1927. (He had his appendix removed on 25 April.) According to Shostakovich, his playing found favor with the audience. He persisted into the final round of the competition but ultimately earned only a diploma, no prize; Oborin was declared the winner. Shostakovich was upset about the result but for a time resolved to continue a career as performer. While recovering from his appendectomy in April 1927, Shostakovich said he was beginning to reassess those plans:

When I was well, I practiced the piano every day. I wanted to carry on like that until autumn and then decide. If I saw that I had not improved, I would quit the whole business. To be a pianist who is worse than Szpinalski, Etkin, Ginzburg, and Bryushkov (it is commonly thought that I am worse than them) is not worth it.

After the competition, Shostakovich and Oborin spent a week in Berlin. There he met the conductor Bruno Walter, who was so impressed by Shostakovich's First Symphony that he conducted its first performance outside Russia later that year. Leopold Stokowski led the American premiere the next year in Philadelphia and also made the work's first recording.

In 1927, Shostakovich wrote his Second Symphony (subtitled To October), a patriotic piece with a pro-Soviet choral finale. Owing to its modernism, it did not meet with the same enthusiasm as his First. This year also marked the beginning of Shostakovich's close friendship with musicologist and theatre critic Ivan Sollertinsky, whom he had first met in 1921 through their mutual friends Lev Arnshtam and Lydia Zhukova. Shostakovich later said that Sollertinsky "taught [him] to understand and love such great masters as Brahms, Mahler, and Bruckner" and that he instilled in him "an interest in music ... from Bach to Offenbach".

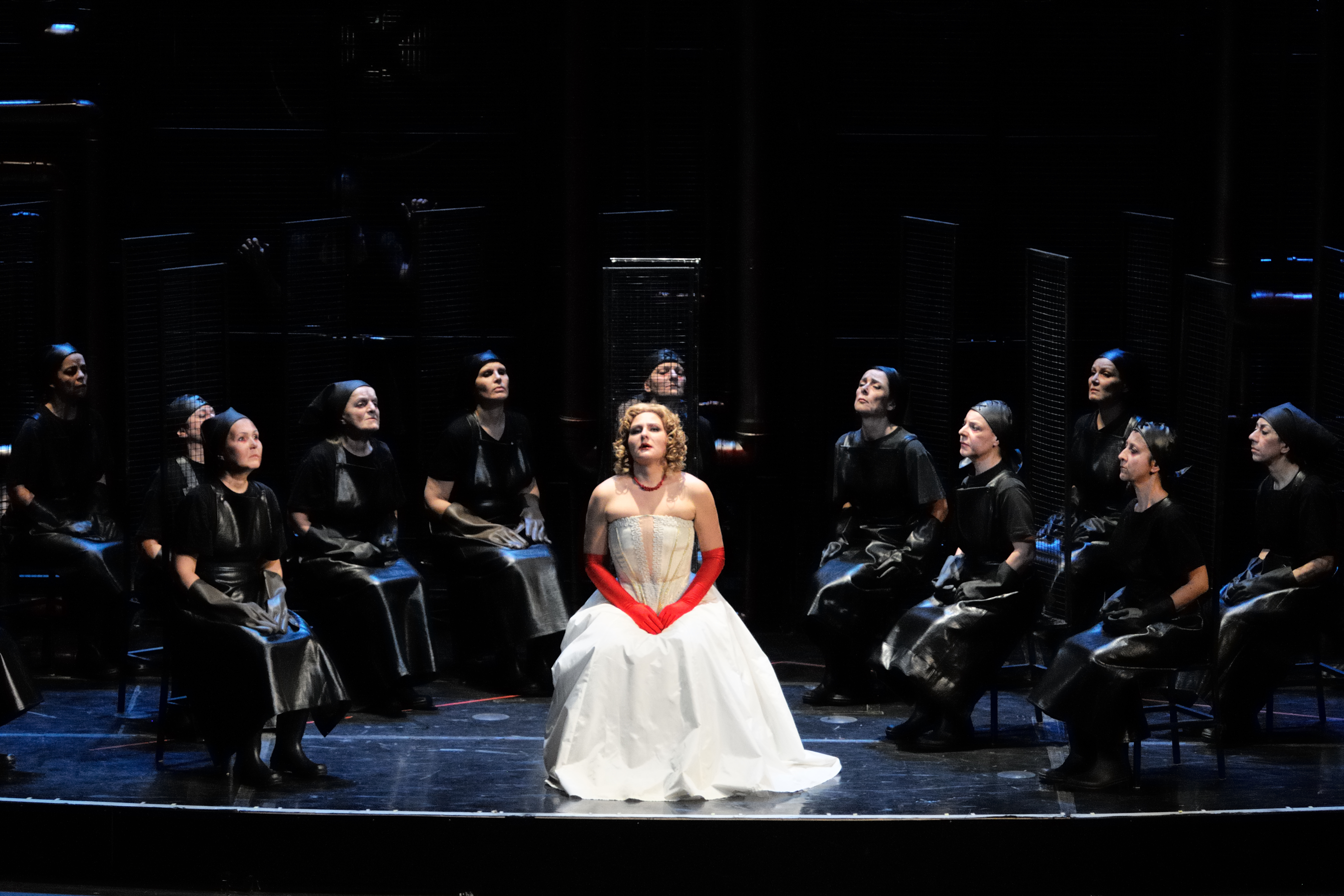
Production of Lady Macbeth of Mtsensk by Helikon Opera in 2014

While writing the Second Symphony, Shostakovich also began work on his satirical opera The Nose, based on the story by Nikolai Gogol. In June 1929, against the composer's wishes, the opera was given a concert performance; it was ferociously attacked by the Russian Association of Proletarian Musicians (RAPM). Its stage premiere on 18 January 1930 opened to generally poor reviews and widespread incomprehension among musicians. In the late 1920s and early 1930s, Shostakovich worked at TRAM, a proletarian youth theatre. Although he did little work in this post, it shielded him from ideological attack. Much of this period was spent writing his opera Lady Macbeth of Mtsensk, which was first performed in 1934. It was initially immediately successful, on both popular and official levels. It was described as "the result of the general success of Socialist construction, of the correct policy of the Party", and as an opera that "could have been written only by a Soviet composer brought up in the best tradition of Soviet culture".

Shostakovich married his first wife, Nina Varzar, in 1932. Difficulties with his marriage led to a divorce in 1935, but the couple soon remarried when Nina became pregnant with their first child, Galina.

=== First denunciation ===
On 17 January 1936 Joseph Stalin paid a rare visit to the opera for a performance of a new work, Quiet Flows the Don, based on the novel by Mikhail Sholokhov, by the little-known composer Ivan Dzerzhinsky, who was called to Stalin's box at the end of the performance and told that his work had "considerable ideological-political value". On 26 January, Stalin revisited the opera, accompanied by Vyacheslav Molotov, Andrei Zhdanov and Anastas Mikoyan, to hear Lady Macbeth of the Mtsensk District. He and his entourage left without speaking to anyone. Shostakovich had been forewarned by a friend that he should postpone a planned concert tour in Arkhangelsk to be present at that particular performance. Eyewitness accounts testify that Shostakovich was "white as a sheet" when he went to take his bow after the third act.

The next day Shostakovich left for Arkhangelsk, where he heard on 28 January that Pravda had published an editorial titled "Muddle Instead of Music", complaining that the opera was a "deliberately dissonant, muddled stream of sounds ...[that] quacks, hoots, pants and gasps". Shostakovich continued his performance tour as scheduled, with no disruptions. From Arkhangelsk, he instructed Isaac Glikman to subscribe to a clipping service. The editorial was the signal for a nationwide campaign, during which even Soviet music critics who had praised the opera were forced to recant in print, saying they "failed to detect the shortcomings of Lady Macbeth as pointed out by Pravda". There was resistance from those who admired Shostakovich, including Sollertinsky, who turned up at a composers' meeting in Leningrad called to denounce the opera and praised it instead. Two other speakers supported him. When Shostakovich returned to Leningrad, he had a telephone call from the commander of the Leningrad Military District, who had been asked by Marshal Mikhail Tukhachevsky to make sure that he was alright. When the writer Isaac Babel was under arrest four years later, he told his interrogators that "it was common ground for us to proclaim the genius of the slighted Shostakovich".

On 6 February Shostakovich was again attacked in Pravda, this time for his light comic ballet The Limpid Stream, which was denounced because "it jangles and expresses nothing" and did not give an accurate picture of peasant life on a collective farm. Fearful that he was about to be arrested, Shostakovich secured an appointment with the Chairman of the USSR State Committee on Culture, Platon Kerzhentsev, who reported to Stalin and Molotov that he had instructed the composer to "reject formalist errors and in his art attain something that could be understood by the broad masses", and that Shostakovich had admitted being in the wrong and had asked for a meeting with Stalin, which was not granted.

The Pravda campaign against Shostakovich caused his commissions and concert appearances, and performances of his music, to decline markedly. His monthly earnings dropped from an average of as much as 12,000 rubles to as little as 2,000.

1936 marked the beginning of the Great Purge, in which many of Shostakovich's friends and relatives were imprisoned or killed. These included Tukhachevsky, executed 12 June 1937; his brother-in-law Vsevolod Frederiks, who was eventually released but died before he returned home; his close friend Nikolai Zhilyayev, a musicologist who had taught Tukhachevsky, was executed; his mother-in-law, the astronomer Sofiya Mikhaylovna Varzar, who was sent to a camp in Karaganda and later released; his friend the Marxist writer Galina Serebryakova, who spent 20 years in the gulag; his uncle Maxim Kostrykin (died); and his colleagues Boris Kornilov (executed) and Adrian Piotrovsky (executed).

Shostakovich's daughter Galina was born during this period in 1936; his son Maxim was born two years later.

==== Withdrawal of the Fourth Symphony ====
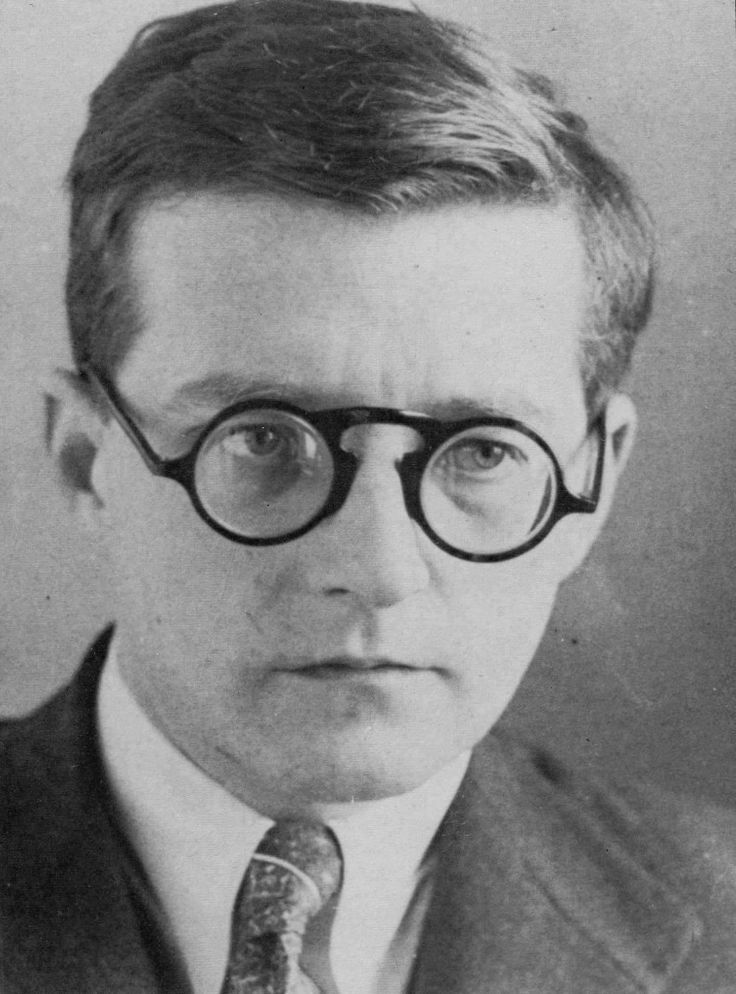
Shostakovich before 1941

The publication of the Pravda editorials coincided with the composition of Shostakovich's Fourth Symphony. The work continued a shift in his style, influenced by the music of Mahler, and gave him problems as he attempted to reform his style. Despite the Pravda articles, he continued to compose the symphony and planned a premiere at the end of 1936. Rehearsals began that December, but according to Isaac Glikman, who had attended the rehearsals with the composer, the manager of the Leningrad Philharmonic persuaded Shostakovich to withdraw the symphony. Shostakovich did not repudiate the work and retained its designation as his Fourth Symphony. (A reduction for two pianos was performed and published in 1946, and the work was finally premiered in 1961.)

In the months between the withdrawal of the Fourth Symphony and the completion of the Fifth on 20 July 1937, the only concert work Shostakovich composed was the Four Romances on Texts by Pushkin.

==== Fifth Symphony and return to favor ====
The composer's response to his denunciation was the Fifth Symphony of 1937, which was musically more conservative than his recent works. Premiered on 21 November 1937 in Leningrad, it was a phenomenal success, bringing many audience members to tears. Later, Shostakovich's disputed memoir, Testimony, stated: "I'll never believe that a man who understood nothing could feel the Fifth Symphony. Of course they understood, they understood what was happening around them and they understood what the Fifth was about".

The success put Shostakovich in good standing once again. Music critics and the authorities alike, including those who had earlier accused him of formalism, claimed that he had learned from his mistakes and become a true Soviet artist. In a newspaper article published under Shostakovich's name, the Fifth was characterized as "A Soviet artist's creative response to just criticism". The composer Dmitry Kabalevsky, who had been among those who disassociated themselves from Shostakovich when the Pravda article was published, praised the Fifth and congratulated Shostakovich for "not having given in to the seductive temptations of his previous 'erroneous' ways".

It was also at this time that Shostakovich composed the first of his string quartets. In September 1937, he began to teach composition at the Leningrad Conservatory, which provided some financial security.

=== Second World War ===
In 1939, before Soviet forces attempted to invade Finland, the Party Secretary of Leningrad Andrei Zhdanov commissioned a celebratory piece from Shostakovich, the Suite on Finnish Themes, to be performed as the marching bands of the Red Army paraded through Helsinki. The Winter War was a bitter experience for the Red Army: the parade never happened, and Shostakovich never laid claim to the authorship of this work. It was not performed until 2001. After the outbreak of war between the Soviet Union and Germany in 1941, Shostakovich initially remained in Leningrad. He tried to enlist in the military but was turned away because of his poor eyesight. To compensate, he became a volunteer for the Leningrad Conservatory's firefighter brigade and delivered a radio broadcast to the Soviet people. The photograph for which he posed was published in newspapers throughout the country.

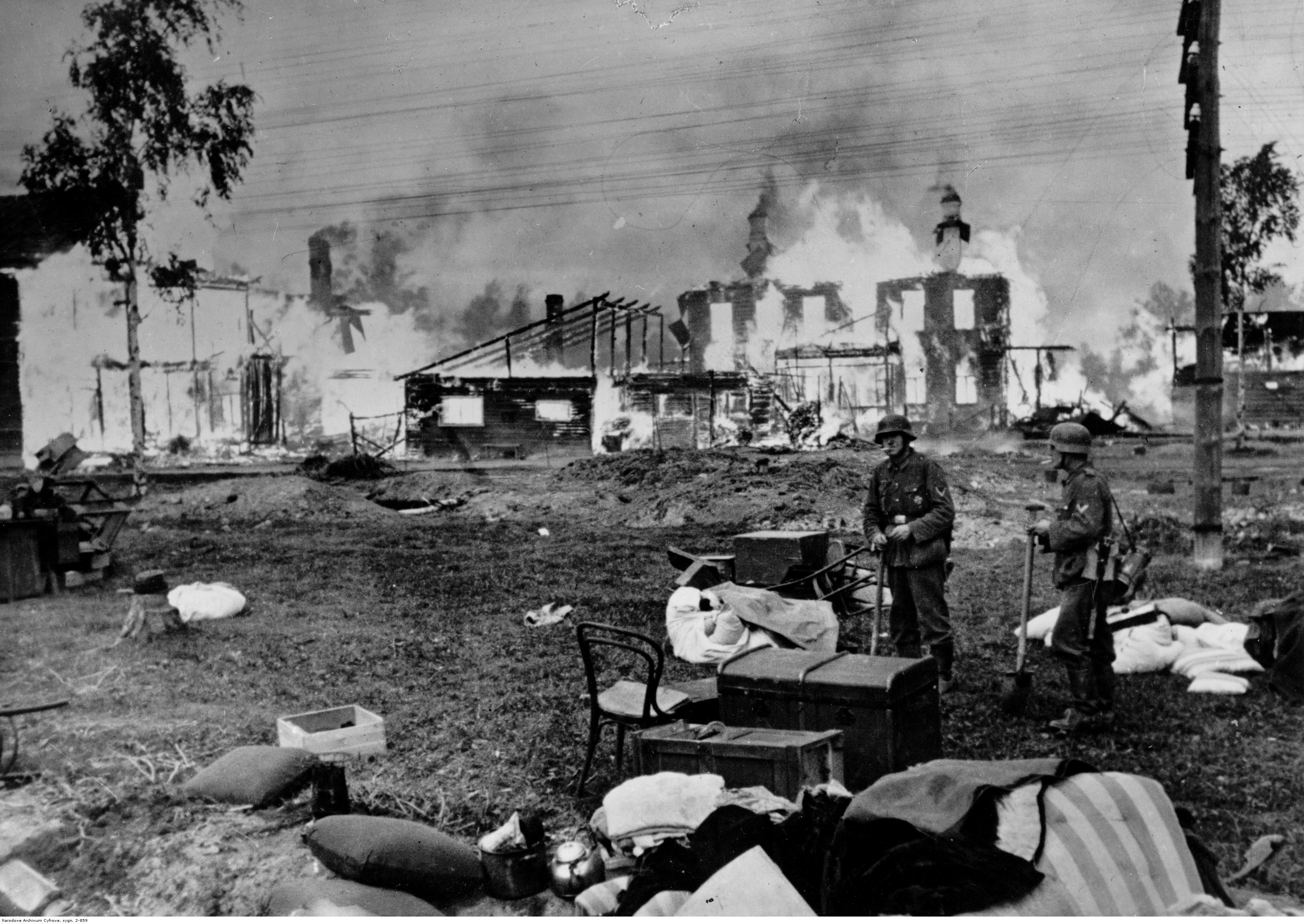
German soldiers in front of burning houses and a church, near Leningrad in 1941

Shostakovich's most famous wartime contribution was his Seventh Symphony. The composer wrote the first three movements in Leningrad while it was under siege; he completed the work in Kuybyshev (now Samara), where he and his family had been evacuated. According to a radio address he made on 17 September 1941, he continued work on the symphony to show his fellow citizens that everyone had a "soldier's duty" to ensure life went on. In another article written on 8 October, he wrote that the Seventh was a "symphony about our age, our people, our sacred war, and our victory". Shostakovich finished his Seventh Symphony on 27 December 1941. The symphony was premiered by the Bolshoi Theatre Orchestra in Kuibyshev on 29 March 1942 and soon performed in London (June 1942) and the United States (July 1942), where several conductors vied to conduct its first American performance. It was performed in Leningrad in August 1942, while the city was still under siege. The city's orchestra had only 14 musicians left, which led conductor Karl Eliasberg to reinforce it by recruiting anyone who could play an instrument.

The Shostakovich family moved to Moscow in spring 1943, by which time the Red Army was on the offensive. As a result, Soviet authorities and the international public were puzzled by the tragic tone of the Eighth Symphony, which in the Western press had briefly acquired the nickname "Stalingrad Symphony". The symphony was received tepidly in the Soviet Union and the West. Olin Downes expressed his disappointment in the piece, but Carlos Chávez, who had conducted the symphony's Mexican premiere, praised it highly.

Shostakovich had expressed as early as 1943 his intention to cap his wartime trilogy of symphonies with a grandiose Ninth. On 16 January 1945, he announced to his students that he had begun work on its first movement the day before. In April, his friend Isaac Glikman heard an extensive portion of the first movement, noting that it was "majestic in scale, in pathos, in its breathtaking motion". Shortly thereafter, Shostakovich ceased work on this version of the Ninth, which remained lost until musicologist Olga Digonskaya rediscovered it in December 2003. Shostakovich began to compose his actual, unrelated Ninth Symphony in late July 1945; he completed it on 30 August. It was shorter and lighter in texture than its predecessors. Gavriil Popov wrote that it was "splendid in its joie de vivre, gaiety, brilliance, and pungency!" By 1946 it was the subject of official criticism. Israel Nestyev asked whether it was the right time for "a light and amusing interlude between Shostakovich's significant creations, a temporary rejection of great, serious problems for the sake of playful, filigree-trimmed trifles". The New York World-Telegram of 27 July 1946 was similarly dismissive: "The Russian composer should not have expressed his feelings about the defeat of Nazism in such a childish manner". Shostakovich continued to compose chamber music, notably his Second Piano Trio, dedicated to the memory of Sollertinsky, with a Jewish-inspired finale.

In 1947, Shostakovich was made a deputy to the Supreme Soviet of the RSFSR.

=== Second denunciation ===
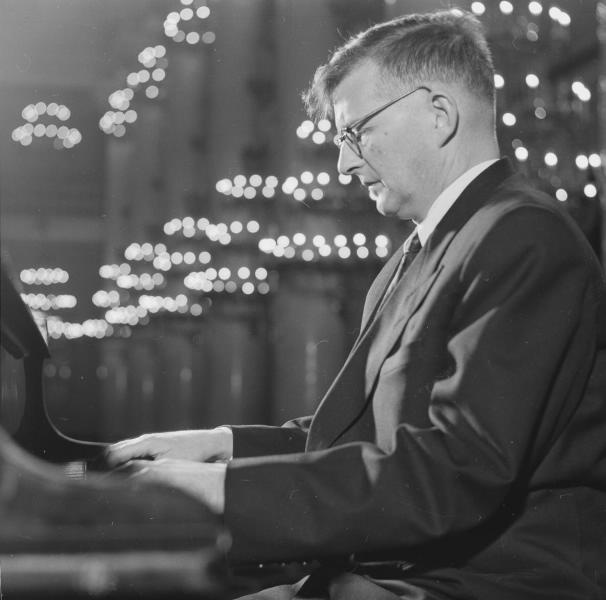
Shostakovich playing the piano in the 1950s

In 1948, Shostakovich, along with many other composers, was again denounced for formalism in the Zhdanov decree. Andrei Zhdanov, Chairman of the Supreme Soviet of the RSFSR, accused the composers (including Sergei Prokofiev and Aram Khachaturian) of writing inappropriate and formalist music. This was part of an ongoing anti-formalism campaign intended to root out all Western compositional influence as well as any perceived "non-Russian" output. The conference resulted in the publication of the Central Committee's Decree "On V. Muradeli's opera The Great Friendship", which targeted all Soviet composers and demanded that they write only "proletarian" music, or music for the masses. The accused composers, including Shostakovich, were summoned to make public apologies in front of the committee. Most of Shostakovich's works were banned, and his family had privileges withdrawn. Yuri Lyubimov says that at this time "he waited for his arrest at night out on the landing by the lift, so that at least his family wouldn't be disturbed".

The decree's consequences for composers were harsh. Shostakovich was among those dismissed from the Conservatory altogether. For him, the loss of money was perhaps the heaviest blow. Others still in the Conservatory experienced an atmosphere thick with suspicion. No one wanted his work to be understood as formalist, so many resorted to accusing their colleagues of writing or performing anti-proletarian music.

During the next few years Shostakovich composed three categories of work: film music to pay the rent, official works aimed at securing official rehabilitation, and serious works "for the desk drawer". The last included the Violin Concerto No. 1 and the song cycle From Jewish Folk Poetry. The cycle was written at a time when the postwar anti-Semitic campaign was already under way, with widespread arrests, including that of Dobrushin and Yuditsky, the compilers of the book from which Shostakovich took his texts.

The restrictions on Shostakovich's music and living arrangements were eased in 1949, when Stalin decided that the Soviets needed to send artistic representatives to the Cultural and Scientific Congress for World Peace in New York City, and that Shostakovich should be among them. For Shostakovich it was a humiliating experience, culminating in a New York press conference where he was expected to read a prepared speech. Nicolas Nabokov, who was present in the audience, witnessed Shostakovich starting to read "in a nervous and shaky voice" before he had to break off "and the speech was continued in English by a suave radio baritone". Fully aware that Shostakovich was not free to speak his mind, Nabokov publicly asked him whether he supported the then recent denunciation of Stravinsky's music in the Soviet Union. A great admirer of Stravinsky who had been influenced by his music, Shostakovich had no alternative but to answer in the affirmative. Nabokov did not hesitate to write that this demonstrated that Shostakovich was "not a free man, but an obedient tool of his government". Shostakovich never forgave Nabokov for this public humiliation. That same year, he composed the cantata Song of the Forests, which praised Stalin as the "great gardener". Stalin's death in 1953 was the biggest step toward Shostakovich's rehabilitation as a creative artist, which was marked by his Tenth Symphony. It features a number of musical quotations and codes (notably the DSCH and Elmira motifs, Elmira Nazirova being a pianist and composer who had studied under Shostakovich in the year before his dismissal from the Moscow Conservatory), the meaning of which is still debated, while the savage second movement, according to Testimony, is intended as a musical portrait of Stalin. The Tenth ranks alongside the Fifth and Seventh as one of Shostakovich's most popular works. 1953 also saw a stream of premieres of the "desk drawer" works.

During the 1940s and 1950s Shostakovich had close relationships with two of his pupils, Galina Ustvolskaya and Elmira Nazirova. In the background to all this remained Shostakovich's first, open marriage to Nina Varzar until her death in 1954. He taught Ustvolskaya from 1939 to 1941 and then from 1947 to 1948. The nature of their relationship is far from clear: Mstislav Rostropovich described it as "tender". Ustvolskaya rejected a proposal of marriage from him after Nina's death. Shostakovich's daughter, Galina, recalled her father consulting her and Maxim about the possibility of Ustvolskaya becoming their stepmother. Ustvolskaya's friend Viktor Suslin said that she had been "deeply disappointed by [Shostakovich's] conspicuous silence" when her music faced criticism after her graduation from the Leningrad Conservatory. The relationship with Nazirova seems to have been one-sided, expressed largely in his letters to her, and can be dated to around 1953 to 1956. He married his second wife, Komsomol activist Margarita Kainova, in 1956; the couple proved ill-matched, and divorced five years later.

In 1954, Shostakovich wrote the Festive Overture, opus 96; it was used as the theme music for the 1980 Summer Olympics. (His "Theme from the film Pirogov, Opus 76a: Finale" was played as the cauldron was lit at the 2004 Summer Olympics in Athens, Greece.)

In 1959, Shostakovich appeared on stage in Moscow at the end of a concert performance of his Fifth Symphony, congratulating Leonard Bernstein and the New York Philharmonic Orchestra for their performance (part of a concert tour of the Soviet Union). Later that year, Bernstein and the Philharmonic recorded the symphony in Boston for Columbia Records.

=== Joining the Party ===
1960 marked another turning point in Shostakovich's life: he joined the Communist Party. The government wanted to appoint him Chairman of the RSFSR Union of Composers, but to hold that position he was required to obtain Party membership. It was understood that Nikita Khrushchev, the First Secretary of the Communist Party from 1953 to 1964, was looking for support from the intelligentsia's leading ranks in an effort to create a better relationship with the Soviet Union's artists. This event has variously been interpreted as a show of commitment, a mark of cowardice, the result of political pressure, and his free decision. On the one hand, the apparat was less repressive than it had been before Stalin's death. On the other, his son recalled that the event reduced Shostakovich to tears, and that he later told his wife Irina that he had been blackmailed. Lev Lebedinsky has said that the composer was suicidal. In 1960, he was appointed Chairman of the RSFSR Union of Composers; from 1962 until his death, he also served as a delegate in the Supreme Soviet of the USSR. By joining the party, Shostakovich also committed himself to finally writing the homage to Lenin that he had promised before. His Twelfth Symphony, which portrays the Bolshevik Revolution and was completed in 1961, was dedicated to Lenin and called "The Year 1917".

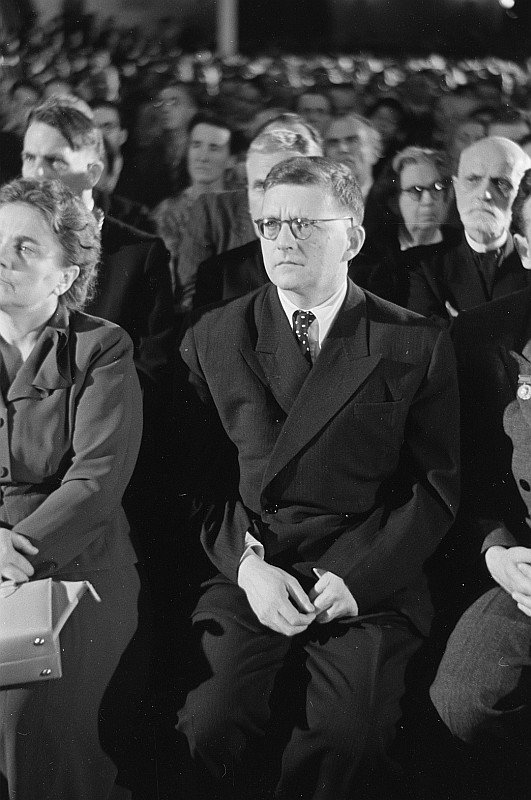
Shostakovich in 1950

Shostakovich's musical response to these personal crises was the Eighth String Quartet, composed in only three days. He subtitled the piece "To the victims of fascism and war", ostensibly in memory of the Dresden fire bombing that took place in 1945. Yet like the Tenth Symphony, the quartet incorporates quotations from several of his past works and his musical monogram. Shostakovich confessed to his friend Isaac Glikman, "I started thinking that if some day I die, nobody is likely to write a work in memory of me, so I had better write one myself". Several of Shostakovich's colleagues, including Natalya Vovsi-Mikhoels and the cellist Valentin Berlinsky, were also aware of the Eighth Quartet's biographical intent. Peter J. Rabinowitz has also pointed to covert references to Richard Strauss's Metamorphosen in it.

In 1962, Shostakovich married for the third time, to Irina Supinskaya. In a letter to Glikman he wrote: "her only defect is that she is 27 years old. In all other respects she is splendid: clever, cheerful, straightforward and very likeable". According to Galina Vishnevskaya, who knew the Shostakoviches well, this marriage was a very happy one: "It was with her that Dmitri Dmitriyevich finally came to know domestic peace... Surely, she prolonged his life by several years". In November, he conducted publicly for the only time in his life, leading a couple of his own works in Gorky; otherwise he declined to conduct, citing nerves and ill health.

That year saw Shostakovich again turn to the subject of anti-Semitism in his Thirteenth Symphony. The symphony sets to music a number of poems by Yevgeny Yevtushenko, the first of which memorializes the Jews massacred by Nazis at Babi Yar during the Second World War. Opinions are divided as to how great a risk this was: the poem had been published in Soviet media and was not banned, but it remained controversial. After the symphony's premiere, Yevtushenko was forced to add a stanza to his poem that said that Russians and Ukrainians had died alongside the Jews at Babi Yar.

In 1965, Shostakovich raised his voice in defence of poet Joseph Brodsky, who was sentenced to five years of exile and hard labor. Shostakovich co-signed protests with Yevtushenko, fellow Soviet artists Kornei Chukovsky, Anna Akhmatova, Samuil Marshak, and the French philosopher Jean-Paul Sartre. After the protests, the sentence was commuted, and Brodsky returned to Leningrad.

=== Later life ===
In 1964, Shostakovich composed the music for the Russian film Hamlet, which was favorably reviewed by The New York Times: "But the lack of this aural stimulation—of Shakespeare's eloquent words—is recompensed in some measure by a splendid and stirring musical score by Dmitri Shostakovich. This has great dignity and depth, and at times an appropriate wildness or becoming levity".

In later life Shostakovich suffered from chronic ill health, but he resisted giving up cigarettes and vodka. Beginning in 1958, he suffered from a debilitating condition that particularly affected his right hand, eventually forcing him to give up piano playing; in 1965, it was diagnosed as poliomyelitis, but consensus on his diagnosis is unclear. He also suffered heart attacks in 1966,1970, and 1971, as well as several falls in which he broke both his legs; in 1967 he wrote in a letter: "Target achieved so far: 75% (right leg broken, left leg broken, right hand defective). All I need to do now is wreck the left hand and then 100% of my extremities will be out of order".

A preoccupation with his own mortality permeates Shostakovich's later works, such as the later quartets and the Fourteenth Symphony of 1969 (a song cycle based on a number of poems on the theme of death). He dedicated the Fourteenth to his close friend Benjamin Britten, who conducted its Western premiere at the 1970 Aldeburgh Festival. The Fifteenth Symphony of 1971 is, by contrast, melodic and retrospective in nature, quoting Wagner, Rossini and the composer's own Fourth Symphony.

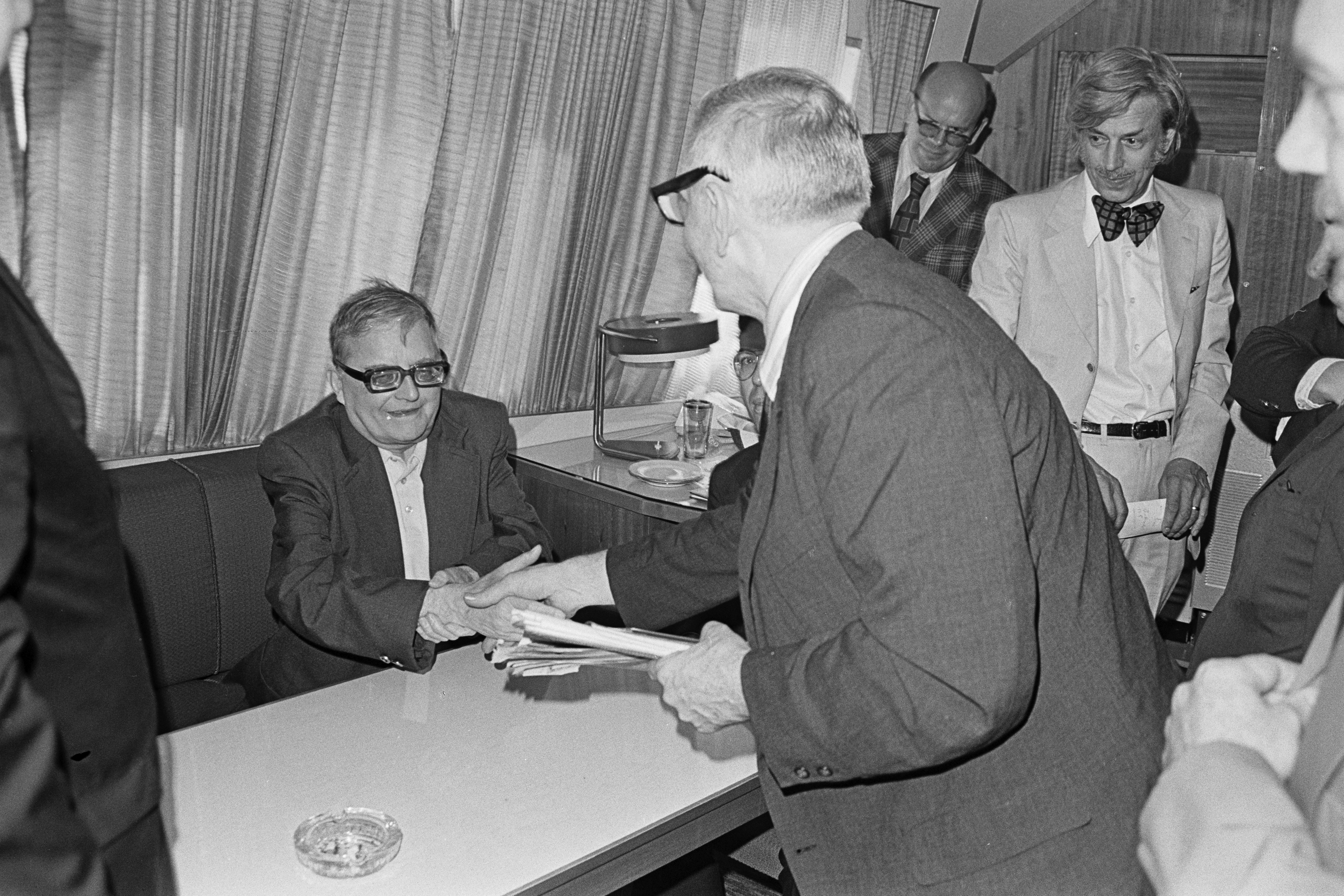
Shostakovich (seated) shakes hands with Daily World reporter Don McMillan aboard the MS Mikhail Lermontov, June 11, 1973

=== Death ===
Beginning in 1958, Shostakovich experienced a decline in his motor functions. He was diagnosed with a rare form of poliomyelitis, although according to his son, Maxim, he was informed that it was motor neurone disease. Nevertheless, Shostakovich insisted upon writing all his own correspondence and music, even when his right hand became virtually unusable. His last work was his Viola Sonata, which was first performed officially on 1 October 1975.

Shostakovich, a smoker since his youth, was forced to give up the habit after having his first heart attack in 1966. He was diagnosed with lung cancer in 1973. His death is variously attributed to lung cancer or heart failure.

Shostakovich died on 9 August 1975 at the Moscow Central Clinical Hospital. A civic funeral was held; he was interred in Novodevichy Cemetery, Moscow.

=== Legacy ===
Shostakovich left behind several recordings of his own piano works; other noted interpreters of his music include Mstislav Rostropovich, Tatiana Nikolayeva, Maria Yudina, David Oistrakh, and members of the Beethoven Quartet.

Shostakovich's influence can be seen in some Nordic composers, such as Lars-Erik Larsson.

The Shostakovich Peninsula on Alexander Island, Antarctica, is named for him.

== Music ==
=== Overview ===
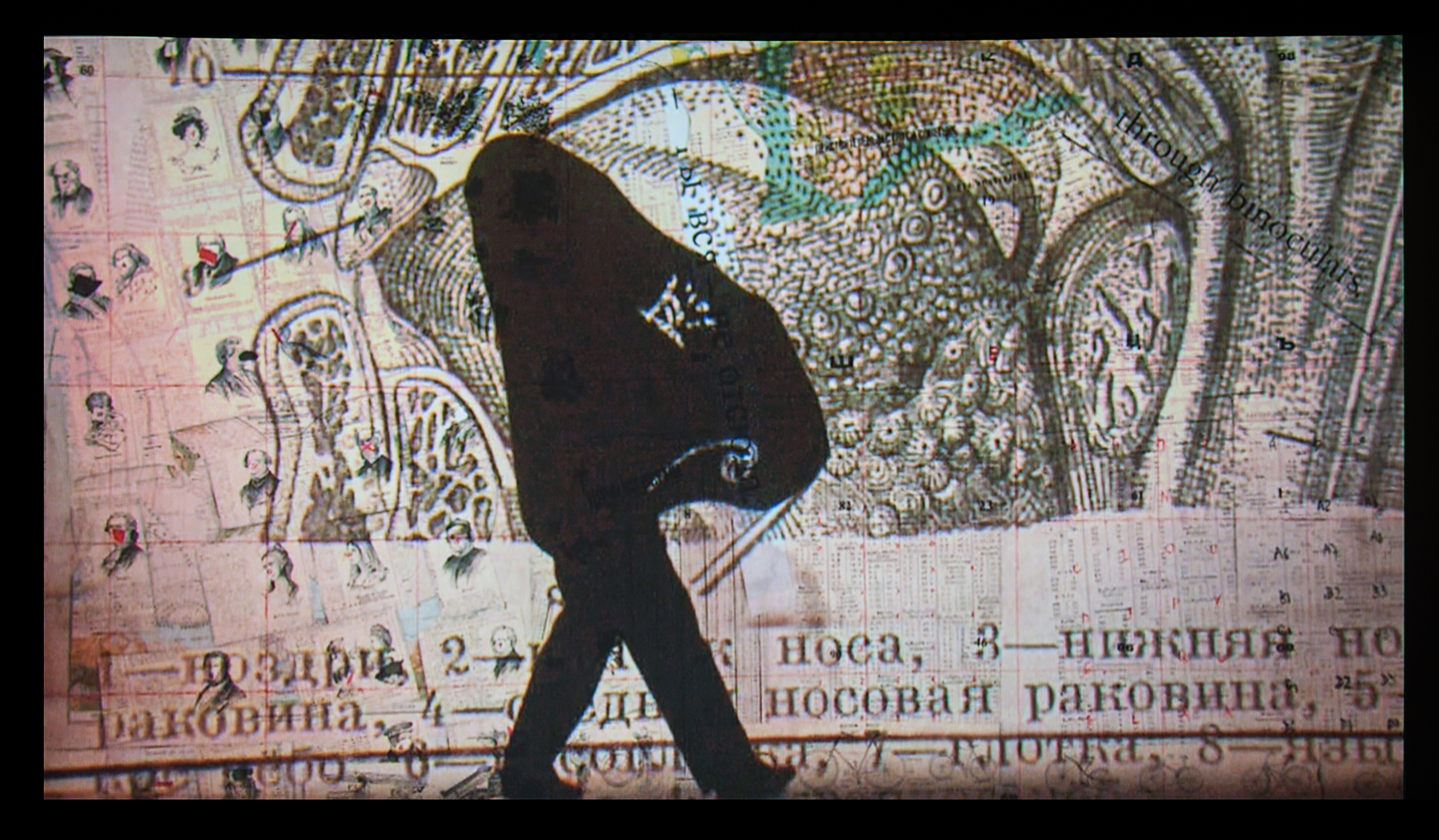
The Nose at The Metropolitan Opera, in New York October 2013

Shostakovich's works are broadly tonal but with elements of atonality and chromaticism. In some of his later works (e.g., the Twelfth Quartet), he made use of tone rows. His output is dominated by his cycles of symphonies and string quartets, each totaling 15. The symphonies are distributed fairly evenly throughout his career, while the quartets are concentrated toward his later life. Among the most popular are the Fifth and Seventh Symphonies and the Eighth and Fifteenth Quartets. Other works include operas, concertos, chamber music, and a large quantity of theatre and film music.

Shostakovich's music shows the influence of many of the composers he most admired: Bach in his fugues and passacaglias; Beethoven in the late quartets; Mahler in the symphonies; and Berg in his use of musical codes and quotations. Among Russian composers he particularly admired Modest Mussorgsky, whose operas Boris Godunov and Khovanshchina he reorchestrated; Mussorgsky's influence is most prominent in the wintry scenes of Lady Macbeth and the Eleventh Symphony, as well as in satirical works such as "Rayok". Prokofiev's influence is most apparent in the earlier piano works, such as the first sonata and first concerto. The influence of Russian church and folk music is evident in his works for unaccompanied choir of the 1950s.

Shostakovich's relationship with Stravinsky was profoundly ambivalent; as he wrote to Glikman, "Stravinsky the composer I worship. Stravinsky the thinker I despise". He was particularly enamoured of the Symphony of Psalms, presenting a copy of his own piano version of it to Stravinsky when the latter visited the USSR in 1962. (The meeting of the two composers was not very successful; observers commented on Shostakovich's extreme nervousness and Stravinsky's "cruelty" to him.)

Many commentators have noted the disjunction between the experimental works before the 1936 denunciation and the more conservative ones that followed; the composer told Flora Litvinova, "without 'Party guidance' ... I would have displayed more brilliance, used more sarcasm, I could have revealed my ideas openly instead of having to resort to camouflage". Articles Shostakovich published in 1934 and 1935 cited Berg, Schoenberg, Krenek, Hindemith, "and especially Stravinsky" among his influences. Key works of the earlier period are the First Symphony, which combined the academicism of the conservatory with his progressive inclinations; The Nose ("The most uncompromisingly modernist of all his stage-works"); Lady Macbeth, which precipitated the denunciation; and the Fourth Symphony, described in Grove's Dictionary as "a colossal synthesis of Shostakovich's musical development to date". The Fourth was also the first piece in which Mahler's influence came to the fore, prefiguring the route Shostakovich took to secure his rehabilitation, while he himself admitted that the preceding two were his least successful.

After 1936, Shostakovich's music became more conservative. During this time he also composed more chamber music. While his chamber works were largely tonal, the late chamber works, which Grove's Dictionary calls a "world of purgatorial numbness", included tone rows, although he treated these thematically rather than serially. Vocal works are also a prominent feature of his late output.

=== Jewish themes ===
In the 1940s, Shostakovich began to show an interest in Jewish themes. He was intrigued by Jewish music's "ability to build a jolly melody on sad intonations". Examples of works that included Jewish themes are the Fourth String Quartet (1949), the First Violin Concerto (1948), and the Four Monologues on Pushkin Poems (1952), as well as the Piano Trio in E minor (1944). He was further inspired to write with Jewish themes when he examined Moisei Beregovski's 1944 thesis on Jewish folk music.

In 1948, Shostakovich acquired a book of Jewish folk songs, from which he composed the song cycle From Jewish Folk Poetry. He initially wrote eight songs meant to represent the hardships of being Jewish in the Soviet Union. To disguise this he added three more meant to demonstrate the great life Jews had under the Soviet government. Despite his efforts to hide the real meaning in the work, the Union of Composers refused to approve his music in 1949 under the pressure of the anti-Semitism that gripped the country. From Jewish Folk Poetry could not be performed until after Stalin's death in March 1953, along with all the other works that were forbidden.

=== Self-quotations ===
Throughout his compositions Shostakovich demonstrated a controlled use of musical quotation. This stylistic choice had been common among earlier composers, but Shostakovich developed it into a defining characteristic of his music. Rather than quoting other composers, Shostakovich preferred to quote himself. Musicologists such as Sofia Moshevich, Ian McDonald, and Stephen Harris have connected his works through their quotations.

One example is the main theme of Katerina's aria, Seryozha, khoroshiy moy, from the fourth act of Lady Macbeth of the Mtsensk District. The aria's beauty comes as a breath of fresh air in the intense, overbearing tone of the scene, in which Katerina visits her lover Sergei in prison. The theme is made tragic when Sergei betrays her and finds a new lover upon blaming Katerina for his incarceration.

More than 25 years later, Shostakovich quoted this theme in his Eighth String Quartet. In the midst of this quartet's oppressive and somber themes, the cello introduces the Seryozha theme "in the 'bright' key of F-sharp major" about three minutes into the fourth movement. This theme emerges once again in his Fourteenth String Quartet. As in the Eighth Quartet, the cello introduces the theme, which here serves as a dedication to the cellist of the Beethoven String Quartet, Sergei Shirinsky.

=== Posthumous publications ===
In 2004, musicologist Olga Digonskaya discovered a trove of Shostakovich manuscripts at the Glinka State Central Museum of Musical Culture in Moscow. In a cardboard file were some "300 pages of musical sketches, pieces and scores" in Shostakovich's hand.

A composer friend bribed Shostakovich's housemaid to regularly deliver the contents of Shostakovich's office waste bin to him, instead of taking it to the garbage. Some of those cast-offs eventually found their way into the Glinka. ... The Glinka archive "contained a huge number of pieces and compositions which were completely unknown or could be traced quite indirectly", Digonskaya said.

Among these were Shostakovich's piano and vocal sketches for a prologue to an opera, Orango (1932). They were orchestrated by the British composer Gerard McBurney and premiered in December 2011 by the Los Angeles Philharmonic conducted by Esa-Pekka Salonen.

=== Reputation ===
According to McBurney, opinion is divided on whether Shostakovich's music is "of visionary power and originality, as some maintain, or, as others think, derivative, trashy, empty and second-hand". William Walton, his British contemporary, described him as "the greatest composer of the 20th century". Musicologist David Fanning concludes in Grove's Dictionary that "Amid the conflicting pressures of official requirements, the mass suffering of his fellow countrymen, and his personal ideals of humanitarian and public service, he succeeded in forging a musical language of colossal emotional power".

Some modern composers have been critical. Pierre Boulez dismissed Shostakovich's music as "the second, or even third pressing of Mahler". The Romanian composer and Webern disciple Philip Gershkovich called Shostakovich "a hack in a trance". A related complaint is that Shostakovich's style is vulgar and strident: Stravinsky wrote of Lady Macbeth: "brutally hammering ... and monotonous". English composer and musicologist Robin Holloway described his music as "battleship-grey in melody and harmony, factory-functional in structure; in content all rhetoric and coercion".

Shostakovich borrows extensively from the material and styles both of earlier composers and of popular music; the vulgarity of "low" music is a notable influence on this "greatest of eclectics". McBurney traces this to the avant-garde artistic circles of the early Soviet period in which Shostakovich moved early in his career, and argues that these borrowings were a deliberate technique to allow him to create "patterns of contrast, repetition, exaggeration" that gave his music large-scale structure.

== Personality ==
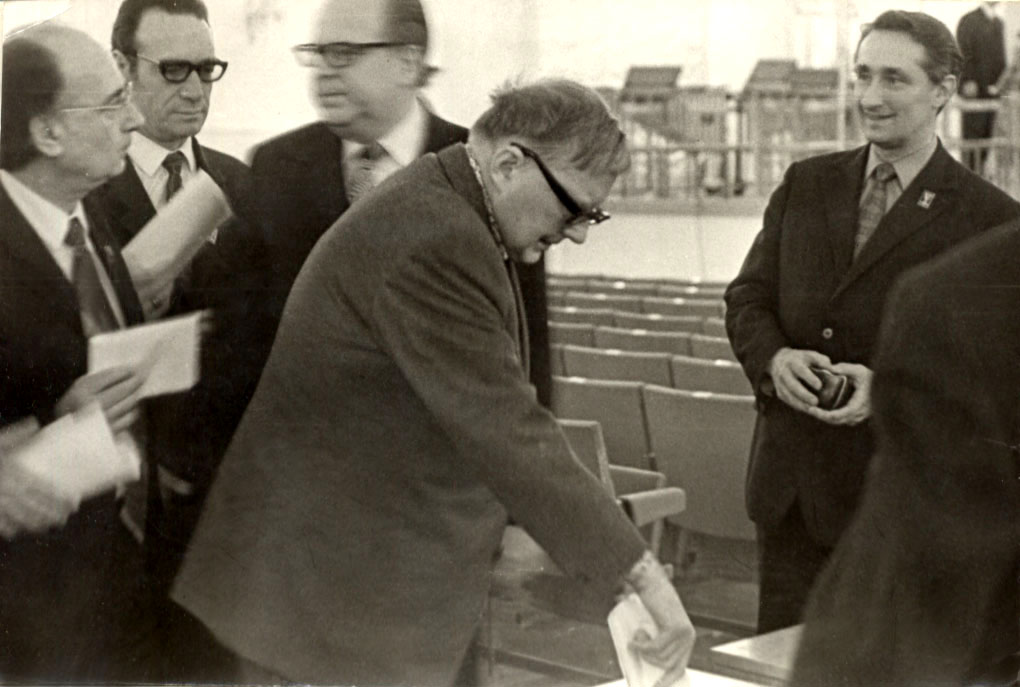
Shostakovich voting in the election of the Council of Administration of Soviet Musicians in Moscow in 1974 (photograph by Yuri Shcherbinin)

Shostakovich was in many ways an obsessive man: according to his daughter he was "obsessed with cleanliness". He synchronised the clocks in his apartment and regularly sent himself cards to test how well the postal service was working. Elizabeth Wilson's Shostakovich: A Life Remembered indexes 26 references to his nervousness. Mikhail Druskin remembers that even as a young man the composer was "fragile and nervously agile". Yuri Lyubimov comments, "The fact that he was more vulnerable and receptive than other people was no doubt an important feature of his genius". In later life, Krzysztof Meyer recalled, "his face was a bag of tics and grimaces".

In Shostakovich's lighter moods, sport was one of his main recreations, although he preferred spectating or officiating to participating (he was a qualified football referee). His favorite football club was Zenit Leningrad (now Zenit Saint Petersburg), which he would watch regularly. He also enjoyed card games, particularly patience.

Shostakovich was fond of satirical writers such as Gogol, Chekhov and Mikhail Zoshchenko. Zoshchenko's influence in particular is evident in his letters, which include wry parodies of Soviet officialese. Zoshchenko noted the contradictions in the composer's character: "he is ... frail, fragile, withdrawn, an infinitely direct, pure child ... [but also] hard, acid, extremely intelligent, strong perhaps, despotic and not altogether good-natured (although cerebrally good-natured)".

Shostakovich was diffident by nature: Flora Litvinova has said he was "completely incapable of saying 'No' to anybody". This meant he was easily persuaded to sign official statements, including a denunciation in 1973 of the Soviet physicist and political activist Andrei Sakharov. Shostakovich's widow later told Helsingin Sanomat that his name was added to the denunciation without his permission. But he was willing to try to help constituents in his capacities as chairman of the Composers' Union and Deputy to the Supreme Soviet. Oleg Prokofiev said, "he tried to help so many people that ... less and less attention was paid to his pleas". When asked if he believed in God, Shostakovich said "No, and I am very sorry about it".

== Orthodoxy and revisionism ==
Shostakovich represented himself in some works with the DSCH motif, consisting of D-E♭-C-B.

Shostakovich's response to official criticism and whether he used music as a kind of covert dissidence is a matter of dispute. He outwardly conformed to official policies and beliefs, read speeches, and signed his name to articles that expounded the government's positions. But it is evident he disliked many aspects of Soviet life, as confirmed by his family, his letters to Isaac Glikman, and the satirical cantata "Rayok", which ridiculed the "anti-formalist" campaign and was kept hidden until after his death. He was a close friend of Marshal of the Soviet Union Mikhail Tukhachevsky, who was executed in 1937 during the Great Purge.

It is also uncertain to what extent Shostakovich expressed his opposition to the state in his music. The revisionist view was put forth by Solomon Volkov in the 1979 book Testimony, which claimed to be Shostakovich's memoirs dictated to Volkov. The book alleged that many of the composer's works contained coded anti-government messages, placing Shostakovich in a tradition of Russian artists outwitting censorship that goes back at least to Alexander Pushkin. He incorporated many quotations and motifs in his work, most notably his musical signature DSCH. His longtime musical collaborator Yevgeny Mravinsky said, "Shostakovich very often explained his intentions with very specific images and connotations".

The revisionist perspective has subsequently been supported by his children, Maxim and Galina, although Maxim said in 1981 that Volkov's book was not his father's work. Volkov has further argued, both in Testimony and in Shostakovich and Stalin, that Shostakovich adopted the role of the yurodivy or holy fool in his relations with the government.

Maxim Shostakovich has also commented on Testimony and Volkov more favorably since 1991, after the dissolution of the Soviet Union. To Allan B. Ho and Dmitry Feofanov, he confirmed that his father had told him about "meeting a young man from Leningrad who knows his music extremely well" and that "Volkov did meet with Shostakovich to work on his reminiscences". Maxim has repeatedly said he is "a supporter both of Testimony and of Volkov". Other prominent revisionists are Ian MacDonald, whose book The New Shostakovich put forward further revisionist interpretations of his music, and Elizabeth Wilson, whose Shostakovich: A Life Remembered provides testimony from many of the composer's acquaintances.

Musicians and scholars including Laurel Fay and Richard Taruskin contested the authenticity and debate the significance of Testimony, alleging that Volkov compiled it from a combination of recycled articles, gossip, and possibly some information directly from the composer. Fay documents these allegations in her 2002 article "Volkov's Testimony reconsidered", showing that the only pages of the original Testimony manuscript that Shostakovich had signed and verified are word-for-word reproductions of earlier interviews he gave, none of which are controversial. Ho and Feofanov have countered that at least two of the signed pages contain controversial material: for instance, "on the first page of chapter 3, where [Shostakovich] notes that the plaque that reads 'In this house lived [Vsevolod] Meyerhold' should also say 'And in this house his wife was brutally murdered'".

== Recorded legacy ==
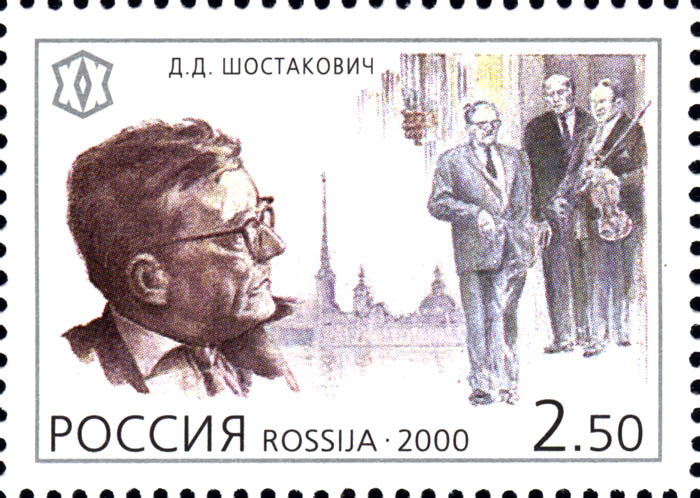
A Russian stamp in Shostakovich's memory, issued in 2000

In May 1958, during a visit to Paris, Shostakovich recorded his two piano concertos with André Cluytens, as well as some short piano works. These were issued on LP by EMI and later reissued on CD. Shostakovich recorded the two concertos in stereo in Moscow for Melodiya. Shostakovich also played the piano solos in recordings of the Cello Sonata, Op. 40 with cellist Daniil Shafran and also with Mstislav Rostropovich; the Violin Sonata, Op. 134, in a private recording made with violinist David Oistrakh; and the Piano Trio, Op. 67 with violinist David Oistrakh and cellist Miloš Sádlo. There is also a short newsreel of Shostakovich as soloist in a 1930s concert performance of the closing moments of his first piano concerto. A color film of Shostakovich supervising the Soviet revival of The Nose in 1974 was also made.

== Awards ==
Soviet Union

- Hero of Socialist Labour (1966)
- Order of Lenin (1946, 1956, 1966)
- Order of the October Revolution (1971)
- Order of the Red Banner of Labour (1940)
- People's Artist of the RSFSR (1948)
- People's Artist of the USSR (1954)
- International Peace Prize (1954)
- Lenin Prize (1958 – for the Symphony No. 11 "The Year 1905")
- Stalin Prize (1941 – for Piano Quintet; 1942 – for the Symphony No. 7; 1946 – for Piano Trio No. 2; 1950 – for Song of the Forests and the score for the film The Fall of Berlin; 1952 – for Ten Poems on Texts by Revolutionary Poets)
- USSR State Prize (1968 – for the cantata The Execution of Stepan Razin for bass, chorus and orchestra)
- Glinka State Prize of the RSFSR (1974 – for the String Quartet No. 14 and choral cycle Loyalty)
- Shevchenko National Prize (1976, posthumous – for the opera Katerina Izmailova)

Academic titles

- Member of the Royal Academy of Science, Letters and Fine Arts of Belgium (1960)
- Honorary Doctor of Arts, Northwestern University (1973)

Other awards

- Léonie Sonning Music Prize (1973)
- Wihuri Sibelius Prize (1958)
- Gold Medal of the Royal Philharmonic Society (1966)

In 1962, he was nominated for an Academy Award for Best Scoring of a Musical Picture for Khovanshchina (1959).

== See also ==
- Sinyavsky–Daniel trial
- Vsevolod Meyerhold State Theatre

== Citations ==
=== References ===
- Ardov, Michael (2004). Memories of Shostakovich. Short Books. ISBN 978-1-904095-64-4.
- Blokker, Roy (1979). The Music of Dmitri Shostakovich, the Symphonies. The great composers. Associated Univ Press. ISBN 978-0-8386-1948-3.
- Brown, Kellie D. (2020). The Sound of Hope: Music as Solace, Resistance and Salvation During the Holocaust and World War II. McFarland. ISBN 978-1-4766-7056-0.
- Edwards, Robert (2006). White Death: Russia's War on Finland 1939–40. London: Weidenfeld & Nicolson. ISBN 978-0-297-84630-7.
- Fairclough, Pauline; Fanning, David, eds. (November 2008). The Cambridge Companion to Shostakovich. Cambridge Companions to Music (1st ed.). Cambridge University Press. ISBN 978-0-521-60315-7.
- Fairclough, Pauline (2019). Dmitry Shostakovich. London: Reaktion Books. ISBN 978-1-78914-127-6.
- Fanning, David; Fay, Laurel (2001). "Dmitri Shostakovich". In Sadie, Stanley; Tyrrell, John (eds.). The New Grove Dictionary of Music and Musicians (2nd ed.). Macmillan.
  Fay, Laurel; Fanning, David (2001). "Shostakovich, Dmitry (Dmitriyevich)". Grove Music Online (8th ed.). Oxford University Press. doi:10.1093/gmo/9781561592630.article.52560. ISBN 978-1-56159-263-0. (subscription, Wikilibrary access, or UK public library membership required)
- Fay, Laurel (2000). Shostakovich: A Life. Oxford University Press. ISBN 978-0-19-513438-4.
- Fay, Laurel (2002). "Volkov's Testimony Reconsidered". In Hamrick Brown, Malcolm (ed.). A Shostakovich Casebook. Indiana University Press. pp. 22–66. ISBN 978-0-253-21823-0.
- Haas, David (2000). "Shostakovich's Eighth: C minor Symphony against the Grain". In Bartlett, Rosamund (ed.). Shostakovich in Context. Oxford University Press. ISBN 9780198166665.
- Ho, Allan; Feofanov, Dmitry (1998). Shostakovich Reconsidered. Toccata Press. ISBN 978-0-907689-56-0.
- Hulme, Derek C. (2010) [2002]. Dmitri Shostakovich Catalogue: The First Hundred Years and Beyond (4th ed.). Lanham, Maryland: Scarecrow Press. ISBN 978-0-8108-7264-6.
- MacDonald, Ian (2006) [1990]. The New Shostakovich. Pimlico. ISBN 978-1-84595-064-4.
- McBurney, Gerard (2002). "Whose Shostakovich?". In Hamrick Brown, Malcolm (ed.). A Shostakovich Casebook. Indiana University Press. ISBN 978-0-253-21823-0.
- McBurney, Gerard (March 2023). "Shostakovich: Work List" (PDF). Boosey & Hawkes. Archived from the original (PDF) on 24 April 2023.
- McSmith, Andy (2015). Fear and the Muse Kept Watch, the Russian Masters – from Akhmativa and Pasternak to Shostakovich and Eisenstein – under Stalin. New York: New Press. ISBN 978-1-62097-079-9.
- Meyer, Krzysztof (1995). Schostakowitsch – Sein Leben, sein Werk, seine Zeit (in German). Bergisch Gladbach: Gustav Lübbe Verlag. ISBN 978-3-7857-0772-2. [Orig. in Polish 1973.]
- Moshevich, Sofia (2004). Dmitri Shostakovich, Pianist. Montreal/Kingston: McGill-Queen's University Press. ISBN 0-7735-2581-5.
- Nabokov, Nicolas (1951). Old Friends and New Music. Hamish Hamilton.
- Shostakovich, Dmitri (1981). Shostakovich: About Himself and His Times. Compiled by L. Grigoryev and Y. Platek. Translated by Angus and Neilian Roxburgh. Moscow: Progress Publishers.
- Shostakovich, Dmitri; Glikman, Isaac (2001). Story of a Friendship: The Letters of Dmitry Shostakovich to Isaak Glikman. Translated by Phillips, Anthony. Cornell University Press. ISBN 978-0-8014-3979-7.
- Tentser, Alexander (2014). "Dmitri Shostakovich and Jewish Music: The Voice of an Oppressed People". In Tentser, Alexander (ed.). The Jewish Experience in Classical Music: Shostakovich and Asia. Cambridge Scholars Publishing. ISBN 978-1-4438-5467-2. Archived from the original on 30 July 2020.
- Taruskin, Richard (2009). On Russian Music. University of California Press. ISBN 978-0-520-24979-0.
- Vishnevskaya, Galina (1985). Galina, A Russian Story. Translated by Guy Daniels (1st ed.). Harcourt Brace Jovanovich. ISBN 978-0-15-634320-6.
- Volkov, Solomon (1979). Testimony: The Memoirs of Dmitri Shostakovich (1st ed.). Faber and Faber. ISBN 978-0-571-11829-8:

Testimony: The Memoirs of Dmitri Shostakovich (7th ed.). Proscenium. 2000. ISBN 978-0-87910-021-6.
Testimony: The Memoirs of Dmitri Shostakovich (25th ed.). Hal Leonard. 2004. ISBN 978-1-61774-771-7.

- Volkov, Solomon (2004). Shostakovich and Stalin: The Extraordinary Relationship Between the Great Composer and the Brutal Dictator. Knopf. ISBN 978-0-375-41082-6.
- Wilson, Elizabeth. Shostakovich: A Life Remembered:

Shostakovich: A Life Remembered (1st ed.). Princeton University Press. 1994. ISBN 978-0-691-02971-9.
Shostakovich: A Life Remembered (2nd ed.). Faber and Faber. 2006. ISBN 978-0-571-22050-2.
Shostakovich: A Life Remembered (2nd ed.). Princeton University Press. 2006b. ISBN 978-0-691-12886-3. (2nd ed. – Kindle) Faber and Faber. 2010. ISBN 978-0-571-26115-4.
Shostakovich: A Life Remembered (new ed.). Faber and Faber. 2011. ISBN 978-0-571-26115-4.
