= Vishnevskaya =

Vishnevskaya may refer to:

- Galina Vishnevskaya (1926-2012), Russian opera singer
- Rostropovich-Vishnevskaya Foundation, American non-profit organization
- 4919 Vishnevskaya, main-belt asteroid
