= From Beyond (Strugatsky novella) =

Novella by Arkady and Boris Strugatsky

- Short story by Arkady and Boris Strugatsky
- Language: Russian
- Genre: Science fiction

Publication
- Published in: Tekhnika – molodyozhi
- Publisher: Detgiz
- Media type: Print (Magazine, Hardback)

From Beyond (novella in three stories) is a science fiction novella by Arkady and Boris Strugatsky, chronologically the first published work of the co-authors. It exists in two versions, the plots of which are little changed: a short story from 1958 and a novella in three stories from 1960.

The 1960 version of the novella From Beyond consists of three stories, from which the overall picture of events gradually emerges. In the first story, officers of the garrison on the Kamchatka, climbing the Adairskaya sopka (the prototype of which was the Avachinskaya sopka), encounter "black helicopters" that land a terribly emaciated man in a mesh T-shirt. In the second story, archaeologists working in Panjakent encounter spider-like mechanisms that abducted several cars and the head of the scientific party, Lozovsky; the diary he left behind, which was found, allowed them to understand that an alien spaceship had landed on Earth — probably without intelligent inhabitants. The archaeologist decided to follow the robots in the hope of meeting their masters. In the third part, the story is told from Lozovsky's own perspective, who became convinced that the aliens' spaceship is controlled autonomously and represents a huge repository of cultural items and living beings from the planets it had visited. Somehow the mechanisms recognized Lozovsky as an intelligent being and dropped him back on Earth.

Initially, in 1957, the Strugatsky brothers wrote the short story From Beyond about the arrival of space aliens on Earth, published in the magazine Tekhnika Molodezhi (1958, No. 1) and the newspaper Komsomolets of Tajikistan (1958, June 25, 27, 29, July 4). Almost immediately, the co-authors came to the idea that the story could be expanded into a full-fledged novella, which was written in April 1958 and first published in the author's collection "Six Matches" (1960). Later, the novella was printed in author's collections of 1964 and 1980, and then it was published exclusively in collected works. The original version of the short story in the same 1958 was translated into Hungarian, Polish, and Romanian; the full version of the novella was published in English translation at least three times.

== Tekhnika Molodezhi version (1958) ==
The action takes place in 1967. The narrative is conducted from the perspective of an unnamed archaeologist working in the vicinity of Stalinabad. His colleague —Boris Yanovich Stronsky— is an archaeologist who fell into the hands of the Aliens and left behind a diary. The action begins on August 23: the narrator is preparing lunch in a tent, worried that Stronsky, who had left for supplies and materials, is already six hours late and that only two cans of preserves and half a pack of tea remain in the camp for six people. At that moment, an Alien appears at the entrance to the tent: "matte black, the height of a large dog, resembling a gigantic spider. It had a round, flat body like a "Molniya" watch, and jointed legs". The Alien carries away the burning primus stove and the preserves, and when the fellow archaeologists return from the dig, it turns out that it has also stolen the narrator's diary, a box of pencils, and a bag with the most valuable finds. This confirms that the narrator had no hallucinations; the perforated traces of the "spider" remain. At night, a glow is observed and a roar is heard; in the morning, the excavation site is found to be completely emptied, all the finds have disappeared; the scree slopes are dotted with perforated traces. The next day, the Black Helicopter appears, abducting the faulty automobile on which Stronsky's group is trying to reach the city. Helicopters are observed again on August 25, after which they disappear. When the archaeologists reach Panjakent, they discovered that Stronsky had disappeared, and the driver Kolya is being held in the militsiya, suspected of dropping the vehicle with the property into an abyss and killing the archaeologist. Only in mid-September do border guards, having calculated the flight paths of the Black Helicopters, discover the Aliens' landing pad and the diary of Boris Yanovich Stronsky, whose contents make up the remaining part of the text. The final lines of the diary read as follows: "...I will make every effort to get in touch with Earth and return back with the owners of the Aliens. I think I will manage to negotiate with them. So, I am going to the ship".

On November 8, Stronsky establishes contact, sending congratulations on the fiftieth anniversary of the Great October and reporting that he has entered into contact with "very worthy and intelligent beings" whose physical parameters are not suitable for landing on Earth. He transmits the messages "in Russian, in German, in Tajik, and in Latin". "Mechanical 'spiders' and Black Helicopters appeared in Antarctica, in northeastern Canada, in Norway. Their debut in Tajikistan was the first landing in low latitudes". The Aliens propose through Stronsky to organize an official contact at any point on the orbit of their ship, since such a flight does not exceed human technical capabilities. "Nineteenth Satellite" (Note: During work on the story, on October 4, 1957, the First Satellite was launched.) transmits the bearings of the Aliens; it soon turns out that Ter-Marukyan, a young employee of the Simeiz Observatory, had discovered the Aliens' ship four months before the appearance of the Black Helicopters.

The rest is known. At a joint meeting of representatives of the presidiums of the Academy of Sciences of the USSR and the People's Republic of China, it was decided to accept the guests' proposal and send to rendezvous Soviet Union and", (Note: Distorted Chinese — 'Great Friendship' (伟大的友谊 ''wěidàde yǒuyì''). A space station with such a name is also mentioned in the novel Land of Crimson Clouds.) the first manned atomic interplanetary ships in the history of earthly humanity. These ships were preparing for a flight around the Moon, but the change in route caused no objections from the crews. The United States sends one unmanned rocket equipped with automatic television transmitters.

== Version of the Six Matches collection (1960) ==
The plot unfolds in three novella-chapters, each of which is a report by one of three individuals who became witnesses and participants in the visit to Earth by cosmic aliens. The order of the novellas is determined by the gradual approaching to the solution. The pseudo-scientific explanatory part is placed in the final in form of "Extracts from the protocol of the final meeting of the Stalinabad commission".

=== The Man in the Mesh Tank Top. Report of Major Kuznetsov, an officer of the headquarters of the N-th unit ===
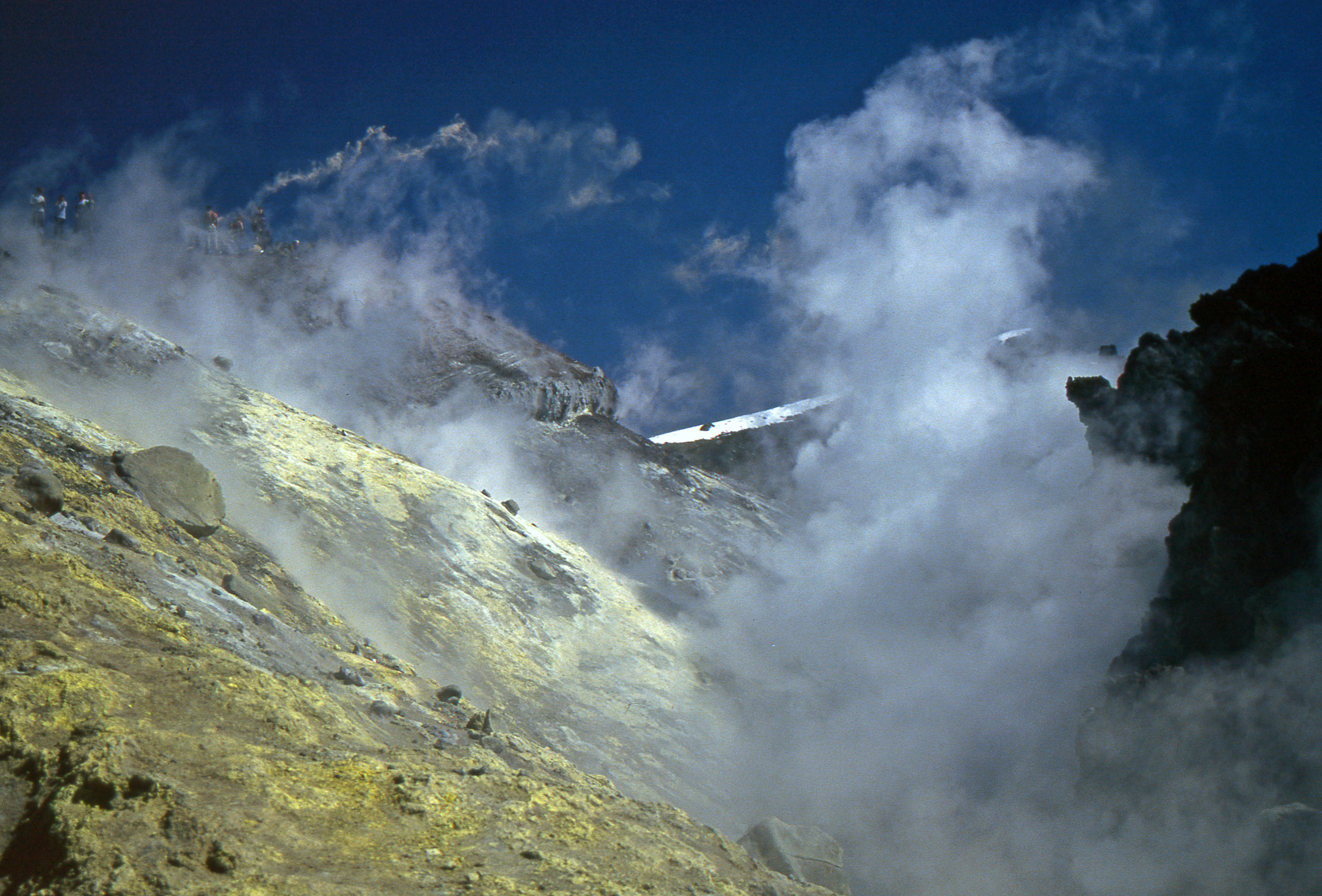
Crater of the Avachinsky volcano. Photo from 1993

The first story is told from the major Kuznetsov's perspective, who, along with his comrades majors Strokuolev, Ginzburg, and Pyryshkin, decided to conquer the Adairskaya Sopka on Kamchatka. For several reasons, the ascent began on Saturday, September 1, 195... at six o'clock in the evening: from the military town to the volcano was no less than thirty kilometers in a straight line, but "what can still be called a road ends at the sixth kilometer, in a small village". Further lay the path across the plateau and the lava field. These places were used by the neighboring aviation unit as a training ground for tactical exercises. Kolya Ginzburg specifically made sure that there would be no exercises on Saturday and Sunday — he had been seriously wounded in the war during an attack by German aviation and did not want to receive wounds from his own as well. At six o'clock in the morning on Sunday, leaving the jeep with the driver on the lava field, the officers began the ascent and by three in the afternoon reached the crater:

Exactly as I imagined the entrance to hell. Beneath us gaped an abyss several tens, or perhaps a hundred, meters deep. The walls of the abyss and its flat bottom were gray-yellow in color and seemed so hopelessly dry, so far from any hint of life, that I immediately wanted to drink. Honestly, here one could physically feel the complete absence of even a molecule of water. From invisible cracks and fissures in the walls and bottom rose streams of foul-smelling sulfurous vapors.

When the alpinists returned to the car at sunset, the gloomy driver Misha reported that planes had flown by. Pyryshkin suspected that night firing drills on radar were being prepared, but they could not leave quickly: fog descended. In the fog, something crashed down on the officers that they took for a dive bomber. However, no attack followed, and immediately the officers found an extremely exhausted man in slippers on bare feet, a mesh sleeveless tank top, and ski pants. His incoherent phrases were incomprehensible: the officers did not believe that a helicopter could dive. When the officers brought the stranger to the village, a "small metal statuette—a strange hunched little man in an unusual pose" fell out of his pants. "... The face ... was executed with astonishing realism—tormented, melancholic, with a pitiful strand of straight hair fallen over the forehead. On the bare back of the little man, angular shoulder blades protruded in huge humps, the knees were sharp, and on the hands stuck out only three crooked clawed fingers each". Pyryshkin brought a doctor and an investigative officer, who the next day sent the found man through the channels.

So we, witnesses to the extraordinary incident at the foot of the Adairskaya Sopka, remained with our unquenched curiosity, with an unclear feeling of something mysterious and overwhelming to the imagination, with the richest possibilities for all sorts of fantastic guesses.

=== The Aliens. Report of participant in the archaeological group Apida K. N. Sergeev ===
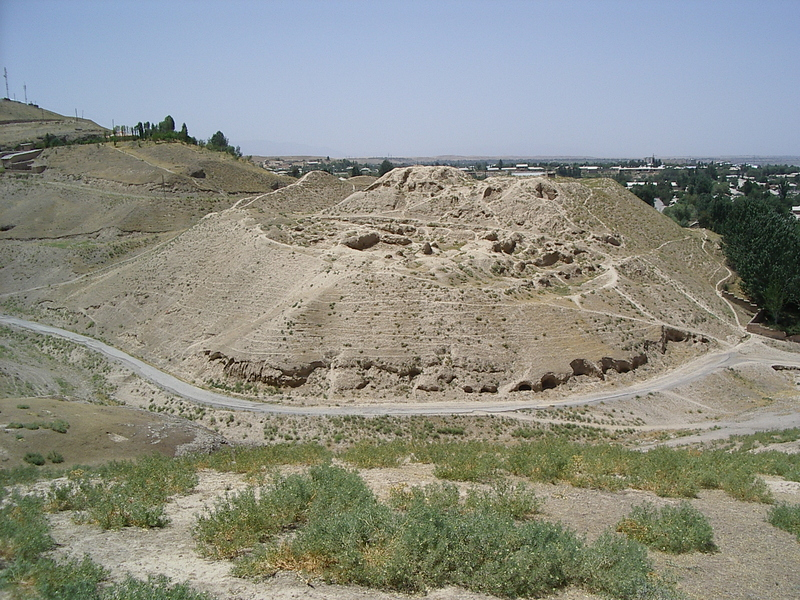
Ruins of ancient Panjakent. Photo from 2008

The second story is a report by a participant in an archaeological expedition, who became a witness to the actions of the Aliens ("spiders") in the vicinity of Stalinabad in August 195... The archaeological group consisted of six people led by Boris Yanovich Lozovsky, as well as two Tajik workers and the driver Kolya. They were excavating the "Apida Castle" on the top of a hill; at the foot was a field camp overlooking the road to Panjakent. Lozovsky left by jeep for supplies, and his return was expected on August 14. Sergeev, from whose perspective the narrative is conducted, was cooking buckwheat porridge and theorizing about Lozovsky's delay when he saw a spider-like Alien at the entrance to the tent. "I cannot describe it in detail. I was too stunned and puzzled". The Tajik foreman Jamil and the workers decided that Sergeev had a heatstroke, but soon it turned out that the "spider" had stolen, besides the primus stove and the preserves, the diary, a box of pencils, and a bag with the most valuable archaeological finds. Jamil was the first to suggest that there was some connection between Lozovsky's disappearance and the appearance of the "spiders". At half past one in the morning, "airplanes" hummed in the sky, and on the opposite mountainside "a bright spot of light appeared, crawled down, went out, and appeared again, but much further to the right". In the morning, not a single potsherd from those found the day before remained at the excavation site, the even floor areas in the excavated rooms were covered with perforated traces. Then Sergeev walked to Panjakent, hoping either to meet Lozovsky or to find a ride. At that moment, the Black Helicopters appeared, which carried away the broken GAZ-69 jeep standing by the roadside. The narrator himself did not encounter the Aliens again, although Jamil and the workers observed the Black Helicopters again on August 16. In Panjakent, Sergeev was told that Lozovsky had left in the morning of August 14, and in the evening of the same day the driver Kolya appeared without the car and Boris Yanovich, reporting an aerial attack. He was taken to the militia and not a single word was believed. Finally, in mid-September, fifteen kilometers from the excavations, border guards, following the routes of several Black Helicopters based on eyewitness accounts, found the landing pad. On it stood the stolen GAZ-69, in which Lozovsky's diary was discovered. It was Lozovsky who first realized the extraterrestrial nature of the Aliens, who did not touch him. The archaeologist had the opportunity to go to Panjakent, to the highway of which it was no more than three hours' walk. The decision to stay bore fruit: Lozovsky became convinced that the Aliens were extraordinarily complex mechanisms, cybernetic or remotely controlled. "Who are the Masters of these machines? Perhaps the Aliens are controlled from inside the ship?" In the last entry dated August 16, Lozovsky reported that he had decided to penetrate the Aliens' ship and fly with them: "If I remain alive—and I have almost no doubt about that—I will make every effort to get in touch with Earth and return back with the Masters of the Aliens. I think I will manage to negotiate with them".

=== On Board the 'Flying Dutchman'. Report of the former head of the archaeological group 'Apida' B. Ya. Lozovsky ===
Boris Lozovsky decided to go with the Aliens because "I would never forgive myself if I limited myself to standing with my mouth agape watching the starship of another world take off. That would be a betrayal. A betrayal of Earth, of science, of everything I believed in, for which I lived, to which I had been striving all my life". Once on the mother ship, which Lozovsky compared to the Flying Dutchman, he became convinced that on board was something between a museum and a zoo.

And in each of the cells in this amazing tunnel-zoo, some creature was swarming, crawling, chewing, pulsating, darting about, staring: elephant-like armored cockroaches, red millipedes of inordinate length, big-eyed half-fish half-birds the size of a car, and something incredibly colorful, toothy, and winged, and something of completely indistinguishable forms immersed in green semi-transparent jelly spread across the floor. Some cells were dark. There, colored lights flashed from time to time, something stirred. I don't know who was sitting in those cages. It's very hard to imagine all this, and even harder to describe and tell—impossible.

Further, Lozovsky became convinced that the ship was fully automated, traveling autonomously in space with the goal of research and collection of samples of fauna and flora from the visited planets. There are no intelligent "Masters" on the ship, and the collection functions are carried out by cybernetic devices programmed to ignore bipedal creatures — obviously, to avoid mistakenly capturing intelligent inhabitants of the studied planets. The scientist attracted the attention of the spider-like robots, which began filming, and delivered an impromptu lecture on Earth's civilization: "...I couldn't bring myself to talk about atomic and hydrogen bombs and poisonous gases. For some reason, I felt ashamed... About everything else, I spoke in detail and with enthusiasm. I think that if the Masters decipher this recording — and there is no doubt about that—they will be pleased". Then Lozovsky encountered the fact that he could not penetrate the enclosures with the earthly animals to get to the water. He managed to steal synthetic food suitable for humans from the robots a couple of times, but the water in the single flask ran out. Lozovsky fell ill from dehydration and loneliness, but it was precisely in a clouded state of consciousness that he made the most remarkable discovery: on the wall of an unoccupied tunnel was scratched an inscription in incomprehensible symbols in seven lines and a crude image of a bird. Nearby lay a desiccated mummy, and in the dust of it was found "a small heavy platinum statuette, a three-fingered little man", which Lozovsky took with him. At the very end, the Masters, who never manifested themselves, having no direct access to the situation, gave the command to return the "bipedal intelligent creature" to its native planet.

What happened next is very well-known. The military, who happened to be nearby, picked me up and sent me to the hospital. I learned this later, when I came to and fully recovered. I was unconscious for almost half a year. They found in me severe exhaustion of the body, bilateral pneumonia, brain fever, and something else. The doctors could not determine this disease. I suspect I caught it on the ship.

But I recovered. Recovered and remembered when they told me something about it. That's all.

... But what a pity that they were only machines!

=== Extracts from the protocol of the final Stalinabad commission's meeting ===
The commission investigating the Contact events managed to establish that the Aliens stayed on Earth for three days and caused no damage to the environment or humanity. The only case when a Soviet fighter opened fire on a Black Helicopter was provoked by humans. The spider-like machines probably represented "so-called ULMP — Universal Logical Machines with Unlimited Program, that is, cybernetic mechanisms capable in any situation of performing actions that are most logical and expedient from the point of view of their main program". The principle of their operation and the source of energy remained unknown: there were no traces of increased radioactive decay at the landing site. Based on the robots' reaction to humans, the commission assumed that the Masters do not differ much from earthlings but have far surpassed humans in the field of technology and cybernetics theory. The launch site of the space ark is unknown; the commission assumed that "it is not excluded that the giant laboratory has been wandering in Space for millennia or even tens of thousands of years and was launched from a very remote corner of the Universe". Apparently, it was this that was observed by employees of the Athens and Simeiz observatories.

Lozovsky's heroic attempt to negotiate with the machines in the absence of their Masters was, of course, doomed to failure in advance. But he did a tremendous thing: he learned and told. Undoubtedly, this was a great feat worthy of a Soviet scientist, a representative of Humanity with a capital H...

== Creation and publishing ==
In the summer of 1957, Boris Strugatsky participated in archaeological excavations in the territory of the Tajik Soviet Socialist Republic and, based on fresh impressions, sketched a draft of the story "Aliens", which he immediately sent to his older brother Arkady Strugatsky. On August 31, Arkady Natanovich reported that the story From Beyond (this title is used for the first time) was still raw: "The everyday and local details are brilliant, but you handled the main task poorly. But the idea—the diary—is excellent: it gives many possibilities, and we will use them". In the same letter, it was reported that the novel Land of Crimson Clouds had been included in the publishing plan. On October 6, Arkady Natanovich evaluated the story somewhat differently: "You gave a completely brilliant composition and two effective and excellently written scenes," and the elder of the Strugatskys "eliminated some inconsistencies, 'non-playing' moments," and signed the final text with the names of both co-authors. On October 14, the manuscript was submitted to the editorial office of the magazine Tekhnika Molodyozhi, and Boris Strugatsky did not like the resulting text, including its "dryish" style. Arkady Strugatsky objected that "in such circumstances, it would be wrong to spread it out," and called the story "not bad". In a letter dated October 24, the elder Strugatsky proposed creating a full-fledged novel based on From Beyond; this idea arose after a conversation with an unnamed employee of Molodaya Gvardiya, who complained about the "lack of simple Soviet science fiction writers".

The story version of From Beyond was published in the January issue of Tekhnika Molodyozhi for 1958 with illustrations by G. Borisov, and in the summer it was printed as a continuation in the Dushanbe newspaper Komsomolets Tadzhikistana in issues dated June 25, 27, 29, and July 4. Boris Strugatsky recalled that the authors first encountered editorial arbitrariness when they were required to insert Soviet-Chinese friendship into the text. Therefore, the beginning and end of the magazine text differed greatly from what remained in the drafts. Authors' copies were not provided to the writers, so Arkady Natanovich bought six issues "through connections" for gifts, one of which was intended for the writers' mother —Alexandra Ivanovna— and one for the excavation leader and prototype of Lozovsky— Boris Yakovlevich Stavis. In the same 1958, the story was translated into Hungarian, Polish, and Romanian, and then into Bulgarian under the title Guests from Space.

In February 1958, a decision was made to create an almanac of science fiction and adventure, for which the writer-orientalist Roman Kim suggested that Arkady Strugatsky write something. On February 17, Arkady wrote to Boris that From Beyond could be expanded into a novel of three chapters, with a volume of about three or four author's sheets. The official order from R. Kim arrived on March 19, 1958, and it became the immediate stimulus for working on From Beyond in the novel format. In April, the co-authors met in Leningrad, but the work on the text did not end there by a long shot. In a letter dated April 26, Arkady Natanovich presented the final plan of the work, including three stories and the conclusion of the Stalinabad commission. The main hero-narrator of the first part was then Major Kovalev, of the second part —archaeologist Titov, and of the third— Lozovsky, and the author of the commission's conclusion was Professor Nikitin. Arkady Strugatsky finished the draft of the novel on May 8. The "smoothed and slobbered" version was sent to Boris Strugatsky on the 11th. On May 19, the version approved by both co-authors was sent to R. Kim in clean copy. Then the manuscript "stuck" for a long time, and on February 17, 1959, A. N. Strugatsky handed over the novel ("threw it into the maw") to Detgiz. He called the result "unexpected," as the science fiction department editor Isaac Kassel and the internal reviewer Kirill Andreev ("a fervent Efremovite and generally one of ours") called the first two stories "excellent" and advised minimal revisions for the third, "in the Wellsian spirit". On April 2, Arkady Natanovich sent Andreev's review to Boris Natanovich, suggesting not to change anything fundamentally, but to add "compassion" to the aliens (as in the scenes where the robots froze if Lozovsky took food for the animals from them). On September 1, 1959, the issue of publishing an author's collection of stories was principally resolved; at that time, it was planned to call it From Beyond after the title and most voluminous piece. The composition of the collection was discussed in the correspondence of the co-authors on December 15.

In 1960, the novel From Beyond was published as part of the author's collection Six Matches, after which it was rarely reprinted. In 1964, it was printed in the collection In the World of Science Fiction and Adventure, and in 1980—in the collection Unscheduled Meetings (the publication of the old piece caused bewilderment among readers). The second novella was reprinted four times in the collection Science Fiction and Adventure in 1967–1989. In 1982, From Beyond was translated into English for the magazine Soviet Literature Monthly, No. 1 (January). Later, the novel was published twice more in English-language science fiction collections: Aliens, Travelers, and Other Strangers (1984) and in the world science fiction anthology by James Gunn The Road to Science Fiction 6: Around the World (1998). After 1991, the novel was published exclusively in collected works and multi-volume sets. For the complete collected works of the "Ludens" group, the clean copy discovered in the Strugatskys' archive was used.

== Literary and artistic features ==
=== Genre typology. Stylistic features. Theme of dialogue with the Other ===
Historian Dmitry Volodihin and science fiction writer Gennady Prashkevich considered From Beyond in the context of the Strugatskys' first major novella The Land of Crimson Clouds. The originality of the work was imparted by its composition from five heterogeneous fragments: three eyewitness accounts in the form of an "artistic report", the diary of B. Ya. Lozovsky, and the final "Excerpt from the protocol of the Stalinabad Commission". To a certain extent, the spirit of the dynamic thriller by I. A. Yefremov Olgoy-Khorkhoy, built on the same expeditionary setting "into the wild backwoods", hovered over the novella. However, from the point of view of Volodihin and Prashkevich, "early Yefremov is as much more energetic and lively than the early Strugatskys as the mature Strugatskys (from the mid-1960s) are literarily more perfect than the mature Yefremov". Also, From Beyond featured two compositional-narrative innovations that were later developed in the brothers-coauthors' work. First, the "artistic report", successfully implemented two decades later in The Beetle in the Anthill (scenes on the planet Nadezhda). Second, "documentalism", further developed in the novella Waves Put Out the Wind. The lack of integrity in the Strugatskys' literary debut was noted by their biographer, science fiction writer Ant Skalandis. He stated that From Beyond was written by three different people at different times: the first chapter was written by Arkady Strugatsky, the second by Boris Strugatsky, the third by the "very young, very inexperienced writer yet" brothers Strugatsky. However, from his point of view, the novella already demonstrated high mastery in descriptions and dialogues, and the stylistic manner of the future mature writers appeared.

Polish Strugatsky scholar Wojciech Kajtoch noted that from the point of view of genre typology, From Beyond was a classic representative of Jules Verne-ian technical science fiction. Within this genre, a fantastic element intrudes into the realistically described world of the present, which is the main object of description. Fantastic machines are presented rationally and plausibly, and the writers clearly indicate the authenticity of their description. The "magazine debut of beginning science fiction writers" demonstrated that the Strugatskys were interested in the same thing as any realist writer, that is, a psychological writer. The story of the aliens' landing was presented in From Beyond from three points of view. First, the officers who, during a tourist excursion to the mountains, discovered the landed "space bunny". The meaning of this episode remained incomprehensible to the military, while the reader's fate of the found person would be revealed from the other stories. The second observer was an archaeologist who was greatly frightened by the aliens' automata. The third was the foundling himself, who, finding himself at the epicenter of the aliens' landing, dared to penetrate the automatic landing module to establish contact with those who sent it. The specifically science-fictional layer was the assumptions related to the attempt to imagine what a fully automated spacecraft intended for exploring and collecting biological samples on many planets, sent by a civilization more advanced than ours, might look like. "The military man's story, taken separately, is a simple, unpretentious episode from the life of a provincial garrison in the Far East".

V. N. Lisovitskaya noted that in their early prose of the 1950s, the Strugatskys actively sought their own style, including constants of the artistic world and ways of actualizing and representing their own "I" and the "Other". The three-part structure of the novella allowed them to assemble the image of the event through the personality of the narrator, rather than the author-narrator. The narrators served as guides into the fantastic world, while being reflections of the authors themselves. At the same time, for the sake of the genre, the heroes' individual traits were greatly erased. And although the central fantastic assumption of the novella is obvious—"reason has no need to wander the cosmos in person, it is enough to send intelligent automata there"—the hero-narrators are constantly in search of answers to questions that are not posed in the text by authorial will. Later, this led to the development of a special, so-called "Hemingway-like", style of the Strugatskys. There is no direct contact with extraterrestrial forms of life in From Beyond, and the "Others" are present only as potential participants in the dialogue. However, at that time the Strugatskys proceeded from the fact that the aliens differ from humans to a minimal degree and possess a similar consciousness. Lozovsky, finding himself in solitude, acutely feels the need for the presence of another thinking subject; he struggles with the temptation to live an animal life on full machine support. When he discovers traces of another intelligent humanoid's presence on the ship, he gains the strength to move on. Lozovsky's discovery of the mummy of a creature with a three-fingered statuette is very important in the context, as it represents the thirst for knowledge and the aspiration to comprehend the unknown. The Strugatskys thereby demonstrate their attitude toward the possibility of dialogue with the "Other". Only beings endowed with consciousness are worthy of attention, and the human "I" can achieve fullness of being only together and through the "other I". The feeling that the "Other" is present as an observer causes the heroes of From Beyond a state of existential horror. Moreover, the "Other" does not enter into contact. According to V. Lisovitskaya, later the Strugatskys created images of progressors (agents of Earth secretly intervening in the course of history of human civilizations on other planets) as a development of the idea of a side observer who does not denote their otherness. According to the Strugatskys, humanity is not ready for contact with another consciousness. Lozovsky, although he certifies himself as a "parliamentarian of humanity", most resembles "a curious child who sneaked into his parents' bedroom": simultaneously "afraid, but very much wanting to be caught". It is no coincidence that his stay on board the space ark ends with a lecture about Earth, during which he himself understands much about himself and people in general. At the same time, Lozovsky did not even try to imagine and understand those to whom he would like to address himself.

Writer Sergei Alkhutov drew attention to the fact that the theme of choice appeared very early in the Strugatskys' work, imparting a dichotomous, deliberate duality to the narrative. From the very beginning, the heroes of the brothers-coauthors' works are adult people endowed with general intellectualism, by their nature highly decent. The motif of choice is in no way simplified; it is far from always a moral choice "between obvious good and obvious evil". In particular, Boris Lozovsky—the Soviet and earthly Man with a capital M—had to choose on board the Aliens' ship "between the passion for knowledge and human dignity".

=== Images system in the science fiction novella ===
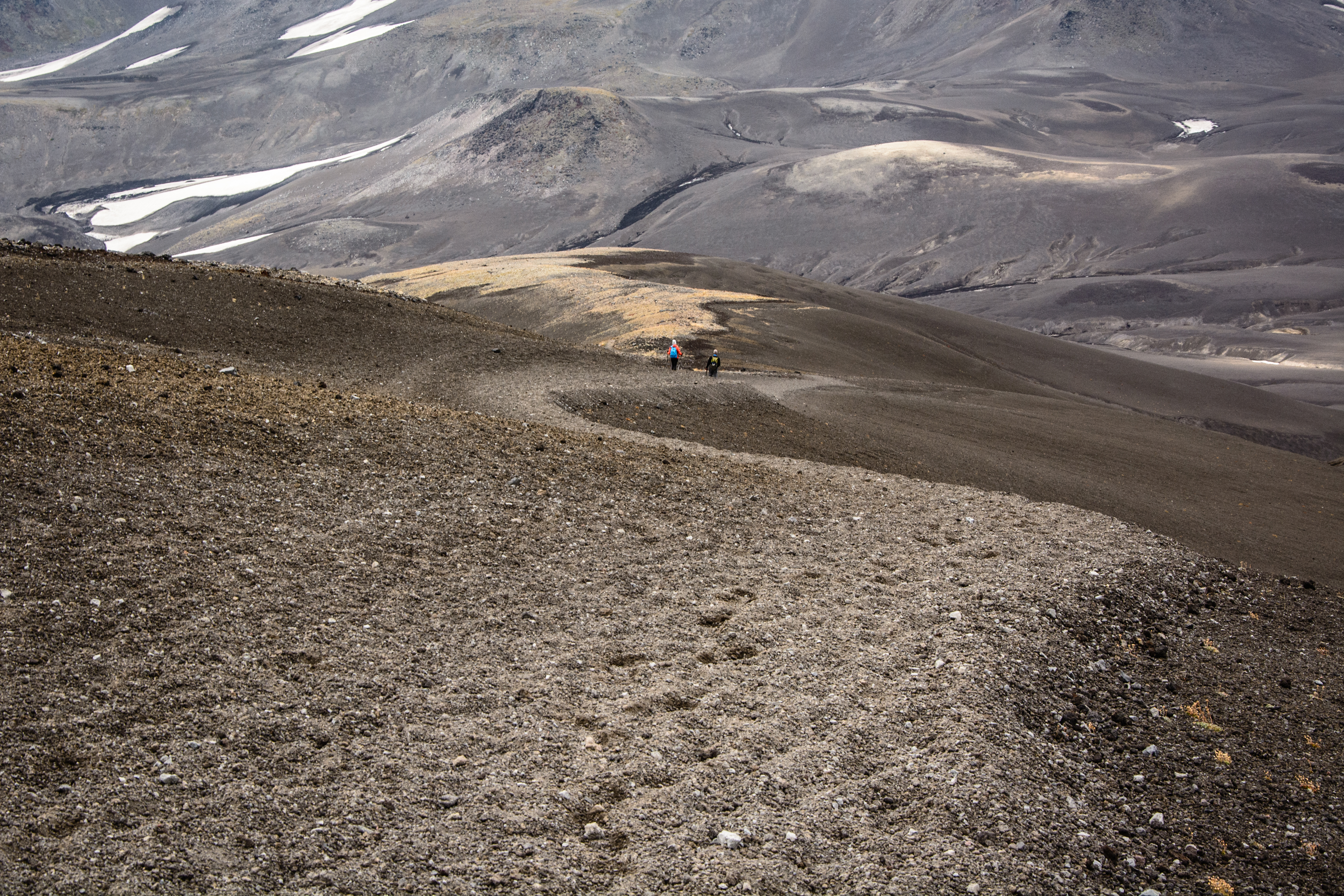
Lava fields on the slopes of Avachinskaya Sopka. Photo 2014

Biographer of the Strugatskys Ant Skalandis noted that in the first chapter (or first story) of the novella, Arkady Strugatsky's ascent of Avachinskaya Sopka is described with documentary accuracy; it took place ten days after his arrival at the Kamchatka garrison in August 1952. Likewise, the archaeological details of the second chapter were practically unchanged memories of Boris Strugatsky's trip with archaeologists to Pendzhikent in the summer of 1957. However, Boris Natanovich himself stated that the colleagues he described did not recognize themselves, although in the original version the archaeologist bore the name of the real excavation leader in Pendzhikent, Boris Yakovlevich Stavis. On the contrary, Arkady Natanovich's colleagues, who became prototypes, willingly agreed with this. Thus, under the name of front-line soldier Kolya Ginsburg, the head of the topographic service, Major Klets, was depicted. The assistant chief of staff for physical training, Major Anikeev, became the PE instructor Major Pyryshkin. Under the name of the narrator, Major Kuznetsov, Arkady Strugatsky depicted himself. The most complex example of inversion was applied to Viktor Strokuolev. This serviceman, aide-de-camp to the division commander, was depicted under his own name and surname, but his image is composite. The literary Strokuolev is certified as a local Casanova, who had a girl in every settlement, whereas in reality the major had a wife and child. According to the text of the novella, the ascent took place on September 2 in a group of four, but in reality, sixteen people ascended Avacha on August 9 and 10.

From the surviving archive drafts, one can trace the inversion of real geographical locations: Abakan—Alakan, Petropavlovsk turned into two different cities—Pavlopetrovsk and Pavlodemyansk, Kanovskaya—Adaidskaya—Adairskaya Sopka (Avachinsky). In the order of self-censorship, some military realities were changed; for example, tactical exercises on the lava field in the draft were aimed bombing, and Strokuolev did not sprain his leg in the summer at a dance in the club, but ended up in the guardhouse. In the archaeological story, B. Ya. Stavis's real name was used in the first drafts, then the variant "Boris Yanovich Kovalev" was proposed, and in the story published in 1958, he received the name "Boris Yanovich Stronsky". Tajik Jamil Karimov in the drafts was Boris Lukonin ("...it was he who arranged for me—an astronomer by specialty—to the expedition, where I enjoyed all the delights of the position of a person without whom one can do without, that is, I washed ceramics, cooked lunch, and took plans of the excavations as needed").

Philosopher Vyacheslav Serbinenko postulated that as early as the second half of the 1950s, the Strugatskys created their own literary metamir, which throughout their creative career served as a laboratory for diverse socio-utopian ideas. This circumstance determined the specifics of the chronotope of all the coauthors' works: "A clear temporal interval is outlined, in which incredible and exciting adventures of the characters will continue to occur". Time in the Strugatskys' early science fiction prose includes a number of interconnected cycles, including their conditional present, that is, the turn of the 1950s–1960s. It is this time and space that dominates the novella From Beyond. Also present are all the attributes of the traditional space genre—the encounter with aliens. V. V. Serbinenko noted that the theme of contact, appearing very early in the Strugatskys' work, remained dominant in it until the very end. He interpreted the plot of From Beyond in terms of sensation: "contact with a UFO". Therefore, the novella is built in the form of a documentary report by different citizens, one of whom experienced a closer contact, the so-called "close encounter of the third kind". However, the archaeologist Lozovsky's only trophy is a metallic idol, and the entire atmosphere of the "visit" is in the field not of rationalism, but quite the opposite—is sinister magical and occult. Serbinenko considers Lozovsky's story of his stay on board the "Flying Dutchman" a vision: to the earthling, it only seemed that he got on an interstellar ark, and the Aliens are "mechanical ghosts of their long-dead Masters, once cursed for some monstrous crime". However, the "devilry" is involved to reveal the character of the super-rationalistically minded heroes, on whom any "demonology" causes not so much horror as "provokes and tempts". Thus, "not even the black robot dogs could prevent Lozovsky from penetrating the 'flying saucer'" (V. Serbinenko, however, calls the hero "slightly deranged by UFOs").

In the novella, as later in all the Strugatskys' work, there are many intertextual cross-references, allusions, and hidden quotes. For example, the Kamchatka officers adapted the beginning of Pushkin's poem The Gypsies in their own way and call one of their colleagues "Tartarin of Alakan" after the title of the famous novel by Alphonse Daudet. The informal naming of Lozovsky "pan chef" dates back to the story My Sister's Engagement by Jaroslav Hašek. The scene in which Lozovsky could not open a can on board the "Flying Dutchman" because he did not take an "opener" dates back to chapter twelve of the novella Three Men in a Boat. He calls the aliens "brothers in reason"—this combination was first used by I. A. Yefremov in the novel Andromeda Nebula. Data on observations in 1955 of mysterious objects on a highly elongated geocentric orbit were taken by B. N. Strugatsky from the abstract journal Astronomy and Geodesy and preserved copied into a notebook.

There are no female characters at all in the novella From Beyond. In all the novellas, the main hero turns out to be a male researcher (or warrior) solving some important task and voluntarily driving himself to exhaustion in fulfilling the mission assigned to him. A characteristic feature of such a hero becomes not just the desire to complete the task, but existence at the limit of human capabilities, and sometimes going beyond these limits. The Strugatskys' "superhumans" are excellently versed in human psychology, and also know how to organize their forces and time to accomplish a vital task.

=== Critics ===
Critic Boris Lyapunov in a large review of Soviet science fiction mentioned that although the theme of the 1958 story was the "arrival of guests from Space", it was not the inhabitants of another planetary system who visited Earth, but their envoys—intelligent machines. Their descriptions remotely resemble the Martians in H. G. Wells's The War of the Worlds. French writer Jacques Bergier mentioned the Strugatskys in his review of Soviet science fiction and called the story From Beyond "remarkable".

Immediately after the publication of the magazine version, Boris Strugatsky's colleague at the Pulkovo Observatory, senior engineer Lydia Alexandrovna Kamionko, responded with the following quatrain, quoted in a letter to Arkady Strugatsky on July 7, 1958:

The writer Strugatsky knows a lot about the science fiction,
Scientifically shod quite well —
Shines with thoughts inside and outside
The immortal novella From Beyond.

Boris Natanovich commented on the epigram as follows: "The Strugatsky brothers are called here 'writer Strugatsky', and the short story is called a 'novella', one must understand, for purely aesthetic reasons—meter there, rhyme, this, that...".

In Arkady Strugatsky's archive, a voluminous internal review from Detgiz, written by the well-known critic of the time K. Andreev and dated February 11, 1959, has been preserved. Arkady Natanovich sent a copy of this review to his brother on April 2, 1959. The critic immediately noted that the Strugatskys "have made great progress in mastering literary craftsmanship" and stated that From Beyond is a significant step forward compared to the science fiction novel The Land of Crimson Clouds, which K. Andreev also reviewed for the publisher. The first story demonstrates "excellent knowledge of army life and language" and is written in a "good realistic manner". The second story, in which the Aliens appear directly, also did not raise objections from the critic. However, Lozovsky's own story was called a "gloomy fantasy" that "cannot but cause sharp objections from all who love and create new Soviet realistic science fiction in its character". The depiction of the aliens' ship corresponds to the canons of Western science fiction, which since the time of H. G. Wells has shown "inhabitants of other worlds as hostile, malicious, repulsive, and in all respects non-human creatures". K. Andreev also identified purely literary inconsistencies: for example, why do the "aliens"-robots need a museum with display cases, and could creatures from other planetary systems remain alive "if the scout spaceship wandered interstellar space for thousands and tens of thousands of years?". The protocol-style conclusion seemed unsuccessful to the critic: "A novella of this type should allow for a twofold solution (delusion, error, misinterpreted or wrongly interpreted event). This is the specifics of the genre".

The collection Six Matches caused a number of reviews that were incorporated into discussions about the essence and functions of the science fiction genre at the turn of the 1950s–1960s. Critics had almost no complaints about the novella, which V. Kajtoch considered "not surprising": the collection Six Matches was published by a children's literature publishing house, and Lozovsky, the space "bunny", was a modern man, "a worthy Soviet scientist, representative of Humanity with a capital H" and had the right "to be a little strange". In M. Iskrin's summary review, maintained in a didactic style, it is recommended to arrange a meeting of schoolchildren readers with a physics teacher so that "the entertaining and mostly quite accessible to pioneers stories become even more interesting". The novella From Beyond is characterized as calling for the boundlessness of knowledge: Lozovsky "penetrates the starship at the risk of never returning to where he lived and worked". However, he wants to comprehend the secret of the ship sent "on a journey through the planets by someone located unknown where".

In 1961, the novella was mentioned in V. Shitova's sarcastic-toned review in the magazine Yunost. The critic found in different works by the Strugatskys (for example, in the story The Forgotten Experiment) traits of horror literature inherent in other science fiction writers as well. In the novella From Beyond, naturalistic descriptions of extraterrestrial fauna are criticized, and indignation is expressed that "the world of the unknown that the future will open to us is a world of horrors, a world of 'mushrooms with eyes'". As a result, V. Shitova comes to the conclusion that all science fiction is a low genre, whose works do not differ in artistic taste and are designed for the most undemanding audience. "When reading such books becomes a habit—and it becomes a habit—a person imperceptibly and often irreparably weans from good books". This is opposed to the work of H. G. Wells and Alexander Belyaev, "who did not entertain with the terrible and did not invent it. The terrible in great science fiction writers is always born from deep reflections on the life of nature and society". The Strugatskys' collections Six Matches and The Way to Amalthea are overall recognized as "requiring discounts for the genre", because they contain "too much of the habitual, the boring". The discussion was joined by leading Leningrad literary researchers E. Brandis and V. Dmitrevsky, who on the pages of the magazine Zvezda and the almanac In the World of Science Fiction and Adventures resolutely spoke in defense of science fiction writers, including the Strugatskys. The critics emphasized the relevance of presenting cybernetics ideas to a wide audience, and in the novella From Beyond, the Strugatskys rose to the level of great generalizations, attempting to assert "the idea of some common patterns in the development of science and technology both on Earth and on other worlds". In a large 1963 article, Brandis and Dmitrevsky stated that "good science fiction and adventure books answer many exciting questions posed by life itself". Accordingly, in From Beyond, "unlike many 'cybernetic' stories, ... the leading role belongs to the human being themselves". Lozovsky is a true Soviet person, a representative of Humanity with a capital H. Against the background of the turbulent development of science fiction, including in large forms, already in Natalia Chernova's summary review of 1963 (magazine Druzhba Narodov), the novella From Beyond is characterized as a "relic of old, traditional adventure science fiction".

Critic Yuli Smelkov in the afterword to the collection Unscheduled Meetings (1980) emphasized that in their early novella, the young writers Arkady and Boris Strugatsky were "talented enough to motivate the Contact situation in detail", but their mastery was not yet sufficient to "take from it everything that can be". The Earth person entering into communication with extraterrestrial reason becomes truly a Cosmic Man. In the atmosphere of enthusiasm of the late 1950s, "the cosmic man was thought of as a slightly improved version of the earthly man". Boris Yanovich Lozovsky is courageous, determined, and his all-consuming passion for knowledge makes him penetrate the aliens' ship without hesitation and not regret what he has done, even having experienced all sorts of hardships. His heroism turned out to be in vain: the Contact did not take place, and what Lozovsky did can be described in just two words—"learned and told". The critic also noted the excessive detail for the scale of the novella in the outlined situation. Literary scholar and philosopher Ilya Kukulin in the 21st century noted that the novella From Beyond at the beginning of the Strugatskys' creative path set their most important thematic context, which later vividly manifested in Roadside Picnic: all earthly life can be a "roadside" from the point of view of more highly developed civilizations that have their own unknown goals—and these goals, quite possibly, do not take into account the interests of either specific people or humanity as a whole. Approximately the same ideas were expressed by readers: "This novella most resembles Roadside Picnic—it does not have the same sad consequences, but it has the same feeling of alien presence that takes no account not only of people's desires, but also in general of what will happen to them. An alien and incomprehensible force".

== Bibliography ==
- Bondarenko, S. P.; Kurilsky, V. M., eds. (2008). Неизвестные Стругацкие. Письма. Рабочие дневники. 1942—1962 гг [Unknown Strugatskys: Letters. Working Diaries. 1942–1962]. Worlds of the Brothers Strugatsky (in Russian). compilers. Moscow, Donetsk: ACT, НКП. ISBN 978-5-17-053845-4.
- Kaitokh, V. (2003). Братья Стругацкие [The Brothers Strugatsky]. Arkady and Boris Strugatsky. Collected Works. In 11 Volumes (in Russian). Vol. 12. Translated by Borisov, V. additional volume. Donetsk: Сталкер. pp. 409–638. ISBN 966-696-215-2.
- Kozlov, I. V. (2020). "Эволюция образов мужчин и женщин в системе персонажей научно-фантастических произведений братьев Стругацких" [Evolution of the Images of Men and Women in the System of Characters of the Brothers Strugatsky's Science Fiction Works]. Неофилология (in Russian). 6 (23): 557–565. doi:10.20310/2587-6953-2020-6-23-557-565.
- Kukulin, I. (2008). "Альтернативное социальное проектирование в советском обществе 1960-1970-х годов, или Почему в современной России не прижились левые политические практики" [Alternative Social Planning in Soviet Society of the 1960s and 1970s, or Why Left-Wing Political Practices Did Not Take Root in Contemporary Russia]. Новое литературное обозрение (in Russian). Polit.ru.
- Lisovitskaya, V. N. (2022). "Поиск «другого» в прозе братьев Стругацких 50-х годов" [The Search for the "Other" in the Prose of the Brothers Strugatsky of the 1950s]. Культура И Текст (in Russian). 1 (48): 57–67.
- Serbinenko, V. (May 1989). "Три века скитаний в мире утопии. Читая братьев Стругацких" [Three Centuries of Wandering in the World of Utopia: Reading the Brothers Strugatsky]. Новый Мир (in Russian) (5): 242–255.
- Skalandis, A. (2008). Братья Стругацкие [The Brothers Strugatsky] (in Russian). Moscow: АСТ. ISBN 978-5-17-052684-0.
- Strugatsky, A.; Strugatsky, B. (2015). Bondarenko, Svetlana; Kurilsky, Viktor; Fleishman, Yuriy (eds.). Полное собрание сочинений в тридцати трёх томах [Complete Collected Works in Thirty-Three Volumes] (in Russian). Vol. 2. 1958. Группа «Людены».
- Strugatsky, A.; Strugatsky, B. (2020). Bondarenko, Svetlana; Kurilsky, Viktor (eds.). Полное собрание сочинений в тридцати трёх томах [Complete Collected Works in Thirty-Three Volumes] (in Russian). Vol. 31. 1997–2000. Группа «Людены».
- Volodikhin, D. M.; Prashkevich, G. M. (2012). Братья Стругацкие [The Brothers Strugatsky]. Life of Remarkable People (in Russian). Vol. 1331. Moscow: Молодая гвардия. ISBN 978-5-235-03475-4.
