= List of compositions dedicated to Mstislav Rostropovich =

The following is a list of compositions dedicated to Mstislav Rostropovich. Throughout Rostropovich's lifetime, over 100 works have been written for him, many of which are now deeply rooted within the cello repertoire.

- Cello Concerto No. 1 (Shostakovich)
- Cello Concerto No. 2 (Shostakovich)
- Cello Concerto (Lutosławski)
- Cello suites (Britten)
- Cello Symphony (Britten)
- Symphony-Concerto (Prokofiev)
- Slava! A Political Overture (Bernstein)
- Tout un monde lointain (Dutilleux)
- The Canticle of the Sun (Gubaidulina)
