= Nikolai Demert =

Russian journalist

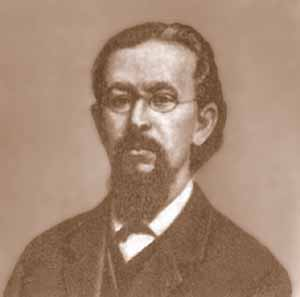
- Born: Nikolai Alexandrovich Demert; Николай Александрович Демерт; December 1835; Chistopolsky Uyezd, Kazan Governorate, Russian Empire
- Died: 1 April 1876 (aged 40); Moscow, Russian Empire
- Resting place: Vagankovo Cemetery, Moscow
- Occupations: writer, publicist
- Relatives: Vladimir Dmitrevsky (elder brother); Alexander Andreyevich Ivanov (maternal cousin)

Nikolai Alexandrovich Demert (Russian: Николай Александрович Демерт, born January 1835 in the Chistopolsky Uyezd of Kazan Governorate, died 1 April 1876 in Moscow) was a Russian writer, journalist and publicist.

== Biography ==
Born to a reasonably well-off landlord's family, Demert was a Kazan University's alumnus. In 1864 he moved to Moscow and there started to write for Moskovskiye Vedomosti and Razvlecheniye. Later in St. Petersburg he joined the staff of Sankt-Peterburgskie Vedomosti, then edited by Evgeny Korsh, to take upon himself the News from Province section. "Demert's lively humour, his original mindset, his hilarious and at the same time rather bizarre way of writing" (according to the B&E Dictionary) has brought him to the attention of first Vasily Kurochkin, then Iskra magazine, which he soon became the major contributor to. In 1867 in Nevsky Sbornik the first chapters of the novel Black Soil Powers were published, but it remained unfinished. After a year spent in the Russian province where he worked as a teacher, Demert returned to St. Petersburg and resumed writing for Iskra, Otechestvennye Zapiski, Nedelya and, since 1874, for Birzhevyie Vedomosti where he soon became the Internal Affairs section editor.

Demert's major claim to fame proved to be the provincial chronicles Our Internal Affairs (Наши внутренние дела) published monthly in Otechestvennye Zapiski. This peak of his writing career, though, did not last long. Years of alcohol abuse started to tell on his physical and mental health. In March 1876 for no apparent reason he arrived to Moscow and, after a night spent in a hotel, was "found on the street with all the symptoms of mental derangement" and sent to a police hospital. There he died on 1 April, to be interred in a Vagankovo common grave, the exact location of which has never been identified.
