= Op. 126 =

In music, Op. 126 stands for Opus number 126. Compositions that are assigned this number include:

- Beethoven – Bagatelles, Op. 126
- Schumann – Seven Piano Pieces in Fughetta Form
- Shostakovich – Cello Concerto No. 2
