= String Quartet in F minor =

String Quartet in F minor may refer to:

- No. 5 of the String Quartets, Op. 20 (Haydn)
- String Quartet No. 11 (Beethoven)
- String Quartet No. 6 (Mendelssohn)
- String Quartet No. 5 (Dvořák)
- String Quartet No. 2 (Nielsen)
- String Quartet No. 11 (Shostakovich)
