= Op. 122 =

In music, Op. 122 stands for Opus number 122. Compositions that are assigned this number include:

- Brahms – Eleven Chorale Preludes
- Shostakovich – String Quartet No. 11
