= Roman Kim =

Kazakh violinist, composer and inventor (born 1991)

- Роман Ким
- Born: 11 October 1991 (age 35); Kazakh SSR, Soviet Union
- Education: Cologne University of Music
- Occupations: Violinist; composer
- Years active: 2000–present

Roman Kim (Russian: Роман Ким; born 11 October 1991) is a Kazakhstani violin virtuoso, composer and inventor.

== Biography ==
Roman Kim was born on 11 October 1991, in the Kazakh Soviet Socialist Republic two months before the dissolution of the Soviet Union to a family with Belarusian and Korean origins. At the age of five he received his first violin and at the age of seven he won first prizes in national competitions. Kim studied at the Central Music School in Moscow from 2000-2008 with Galina Turchaninova and was a scholarship student of the Mstislav Rostropovich Foundation, winning the first International Russian Rotary Children’s Music Competition in 2002. He subsequently attended master classes with Maxim Vengerov, Midori Goto, Lewis Kaplan, Miriam Fried and Gidon Kremer.

In 2008, at age 16, Kim was admitted to the Cologne University of Music, where he studied with Viktor Tretyakov. In 2012, he won the first prize of the 28th Valsesia Musica in Italy. As a winner of the Cologne International Music Competition (2011), Kim played with the WDR Radio Orchestra of Cologne. Kim plays a violin by Alexander Hazin "Superior", 2015. "My most important teachers were Moscow State Conservatory instructor Galina Turchaninova and Viktor Tretyakov", Kim says. "Turchaninova gave me a wonderful technical basis, and Tretyakov affected me very strongly musically". Kim specializes in violin concertos of the Romantic period and virtuoso works for the violin. Kim has studied the bow and finger techniques of the legendary violinist Paganini in depth, and like Paganini, has created new arrangements for various musical works.

Kim has also stated that Jimi Hendrix is another source of inspiration for him. Kim’s version of Bach's "Air on a G String" brought him international recognition in 2011 and has been viewed over 1.3 million times on YouTube.

== Acclaim and honors ==
Israeli virtuoso Ivry Gitlis described Kim's mastery of his instrument as "one of the most incredible playing I have heard since I was born!" In 2016, he won the Ivry Gitlis prize at the Festival Le Printemps du Violon in Paris.

== Playing Style ==
In his violin solo videos, he plays up to four strings at the same time, often 'mimicking' the sounds of kettle drums, woodwinds and horns. In his respective YouTube videos, namely 'N. Paganini - God Save the King' and 'Roman Kim - I BRINDISI, he can be seen making pizzicatos with his mouth.

Kim also uses a harmonic technique that can't be explained with the conventional understanding of science in stringed instruments. In a recent YouTube video, Kim explained during a conversation with violinist Daniel Kurganov that when he was thirteen, he "heard a Russian orchestral violinist mention in passing that he could produce harmonics on any note with a single finger." After many years, Kim was able to recreate the effect through intense experimentation with different factors like string properties, bow speed, and contact point.

== Transcriptions ==
As a composer, Kim has created various transcriptions as well as works for violin and piano, and a violin concerto premiered in Cluj-Napoca, Romania in 2017.

Transcriptions and compositions for solo violin

- Dies Irae (2015)
- Eine Kleine Nachtmusik (2019)
- Highway Star (Deep Purple) (2017)
- Love Me Two Times (The Doors) (2019)
- Requiem for Solo Violin
- Air on the G string
- First movement of Symphony No. 5 (Beethoven) (2022)

For violin and piano

- Three Romances (2012–14)
- I Brindisi (2013)
- Sonata in G (2023)
- Cri de l'âme (2024)

== Style ==
Kim is known for wearing prismatic glasses that he invented in 2014, believed (by himself) to improve focus and concentration.
