= Elena Rostropovich =

Russian pianist (born 1958)

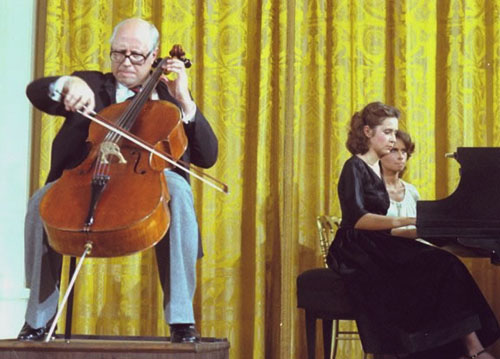
- Elena Rostropovich and her father Mstislav Rostropovich perform at the White House in 1978

Background information
- Born: 1958 (age 67–68)
- Origin: Moscow
- Genres: Classical
- Occupation: Pianist
- Instrument: Piano

Elena Rostropovich (Russian: Елена Ростропович; born June 22, 1958 in Moscow) is a pianist. She left Russia with her parents, cellist and conductor Mstislav Rostropovich and soprano Galina Vishnevskaya in 1974. She is also a philanthropist.

== Early years ==
She began to study piano at the age of 4 with her grandmother, Sofia. At the age of 6, she entered the pre‑Conservatory Central Music School in Moscow where she continued to study piano with Evgeny Timakin. Her first appearance as a soloist with orchestra was at the age of 11 in Yaroslavl, Russia. In 1974, her father and mother were forced to leave Russia with their two daughters for publicly defending and supporting the dissident writer Alexander Solzhenitsyn.

In 1975, Elena entered the Juilliard School of Music in New York, graduating in three years. She continued her studies in Vermont with Rudolf Serkin. At the same time, Elena began to perform as a soloist and as an accompanist for her father.

== Music career ==
She made her Carnegie Hall debut in 1980. Elena accompanied her father in recitals in New York, Boston, Washington, London, Paris, Frankfurt, Los Angeles, Tokyo, Hong Kong, Jerusalem, and Rio de Janeiro. In 1978, she accompanied her father in concert at the White House for President Jimmy Carter and his wife Rosalynn. This performance was broadcast live worldwide.

In 1989, she became the vice-president of the 1st International Piano Competition "World Music Masters" in Paris. As a mother of four children, she was unable to continue to travel with her father, so she began to write her own compositions. A record of her work entitled Love without Reasons was released by EMI in 1990.

From 1997 until 2001, Elena was general director of the International Music Festival "Rencontres Musicales d’Evian" (France).

From 2001 until 2007, she was her father's manager. She also joined the board of directors of the Rostropovich-Vishnevskaya Foundation (RVF), based in Washington, DC, a charitable organization dedicated to modernizing healthcare for children throughout the world.

== Philanthropy ==
In 2007, following the death of her father, Elena became president of the RVF. Since its founding in 1991, RVF has designed and financed sustainable immunization and other children’s public health programs for over 20 million individuals in many countries, including Russia, Azerbaijan, Armenia, Georgia, Kyrgyzstan, and Tajikistan.

In 2008, she founded the Rostropovich-Vishnevskaya Association, based in Paris, France, to focus on the social issues of children in need. In 2013, the name of the association was changed to the Association Elena Rostropovich (AER). Elena has created various projects for vulnerable children in France and in the Near East, which were then developed together with AER.

On April 23, 2013, "Al Sununu" choirs in Bethlehem, Gaza City, Amman, Damascus and Beirut performed simultaneously via satellite a live concert of their traditional music.

France 2011: Creation of Music Room for hearing-impaired children and adolescents at Institut National des Jeunes Sourds in Paris. With the opening of this music room, over 200 deaf students have access to music through vibration, visual, and other sensory stimuli that do not depend on the ability to hear sound.

Russia 2013-2015: Developing a new pilot program in Russia : the creation of children’s choirs in orphanages in the Moscow area with the participation of over 300 children.

Elena Rostropovich is Honorary Chairwoman of the Board of the Rostropovich Cello Foundation in Kronberg (Germany) and President of the Rostropovich Foundation “Support to Lithuanian Children” (Lithuania).

In 2009, she was named Honorary President of the Rostropovich International Cello Competition in Paris, France.

In 2013, she became a member of the Board of Trustees of Chorale Society created by the Russian government.
