= Cello Concerto No. 2 (Shostakovich) =

1966 concerto for cello and orchestra by Dmitri Shostakovich

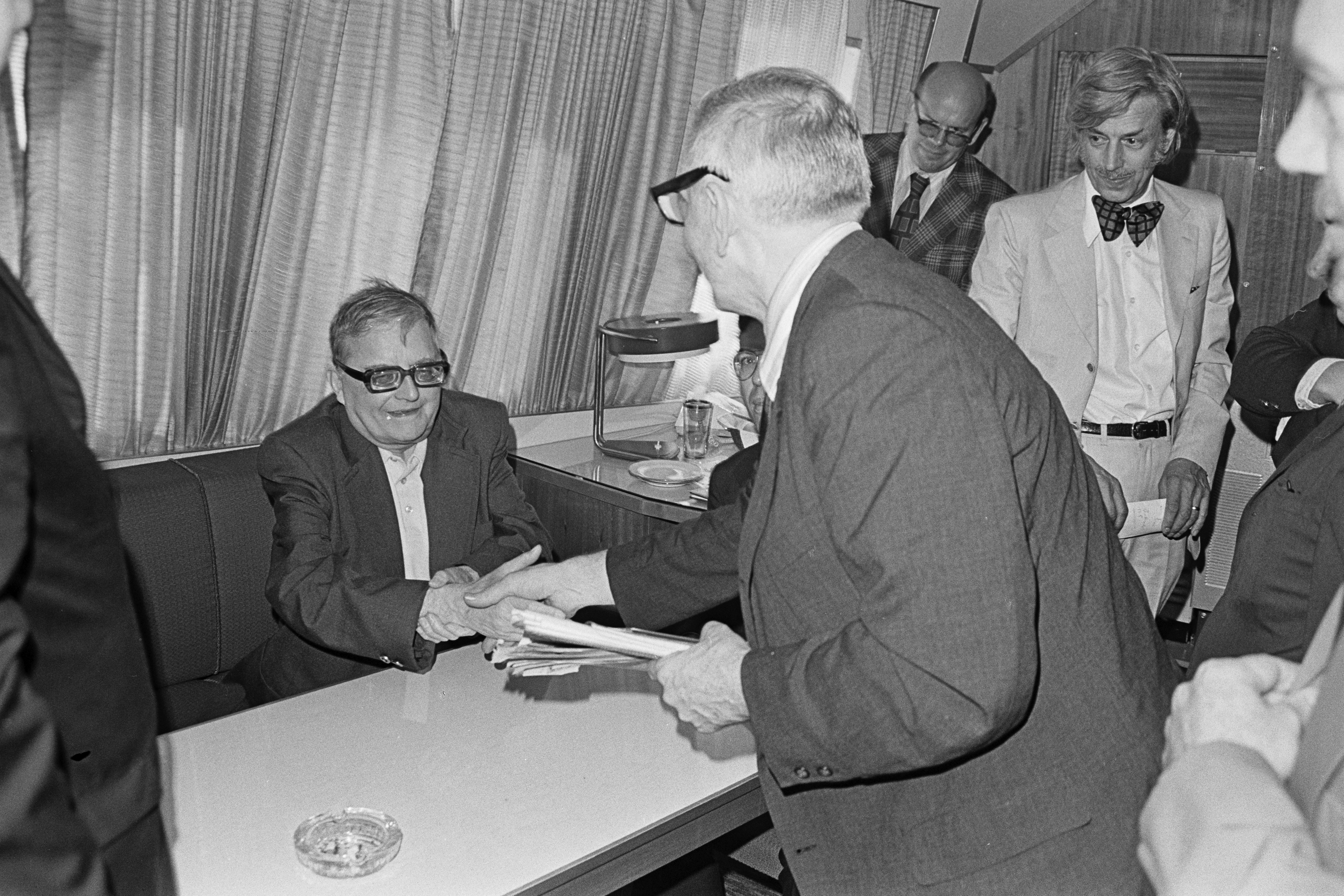
Dmitri Shostakovich (seated) shakes hands with reporter Don McMillan in 1973

Dmitri Shostakovich wrote his Cello Concerto No. 2, Op. 126, in 1966 in the Crimea. Like the First Cello Concerto, it was written for Mstislav Rostropovich, who gave the premiere in Moscow under Yevgeny Svetlanov on 25 September 1966 at the composer's 60th birthday concert. The concerto is sometimes listed as in the key of G, but the score gives no such indication.

Along with the Eleventh String Quartet, the Preface to the Complete Works, and the Seven Romances on Texts by Alexander Blok, the Second Cello Concerto signals the beginning of Shostakovich's late style.

== Composition ==
Like the Fourth Symphony and Ninth String Quartet before it and the Fifteenth Symphony after it, the Second Cello Concerto gave Shostakovich some compositional problems. The opening Largo was originally conceived as the start of a new symphony. But Shostakovich abandoned that idea, and reworked the movement into its present form. The finale also gave him trouble. He confessed to Rostropovich that he had a finale completely written out but decided it was weak, scrapped it, and replaced it with the one we know today. Shostakovich also allowed Rostropovich to make a few changes to the concerto's cadenzas.

== Music ==
The concerto is scored for solo cello, one piccolo, one flute, two oboes, two clarinets (each doubling B♭ and A), two bassoons, contrabassoon (doubling 3rd bassoon), two horns, percussion (timpani, slapstick, wood block, tom-tom, tambourine, snare drum, bass drum, and xylophone), two harps (always in unison as indicated on the score), and strings.

The concerto lasts around 35 minutes and has three movements:

1. Largo
2. Allegretto
3. Allegretto

=== I. Largo ===
The first movement begins with solo cello, later joined by cellos and basses in octaves, interrupted by the cadenza before the opening theme returns. It then builds up with a series of interjections by the xylophone. The exchanges continue until the cello leads the orchestra into a climax, which gives way to a cadenza restating the opening material, punctuated by bass drum thumps. The movement ends softly.

=== II. Allegretto ===
The second movement is based on a theme from an Odessa street song, Bubliki, kupitye, bubliki (Buy My Bread Rolls).

=== III. Allegretto ===
The finale begins with French horn fanfares over a long snare drum roll, followed by a cello cadenza accompanied only by tambourine. The Allegretto then moves through lyric, march, and dance sections. It builds in intensity, rising with an exchange of cello bursts countered by the snare drum, eventually developing into a climax; first restating the fanfare theme, then reverting to a grotesque variation of the Odessa theme. The whip is cracked twice during the climax, then ending the tutti. The cello then revisits the dancelike statement from earlier in the movement. In the coda the cello sustains a D over a percussion motif, concluding with a solo sforzando.
