= Chistopolsky Uyezd =

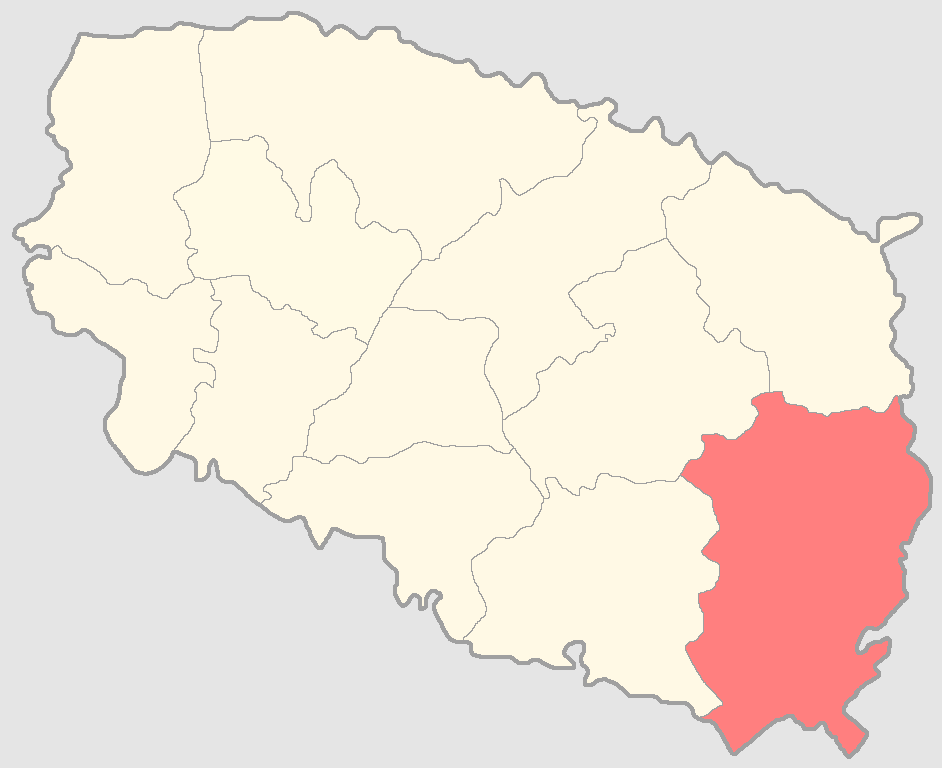
Map of the uezd

Chistopolsky Uyezd (Чистопольский уезд) was one of the subdivisions of the Kazan Governorate of the Russian Empire. It was situated in the southeastern part of the governorate. Its administrative centre was Chistopol.

== Demographics ==
At the time of the Russian Empire Census of 1897, Chistopolsky Uyezd had a population of 305,711. Of these, 48.4% spoke Russian, 32.2% Tatar, 16.2% Chuvash and 3.2% Mordvin as their native language.
