= Galina Vishnevskaya =

Russian soprano (1926–2012)

- Галина Вишневская
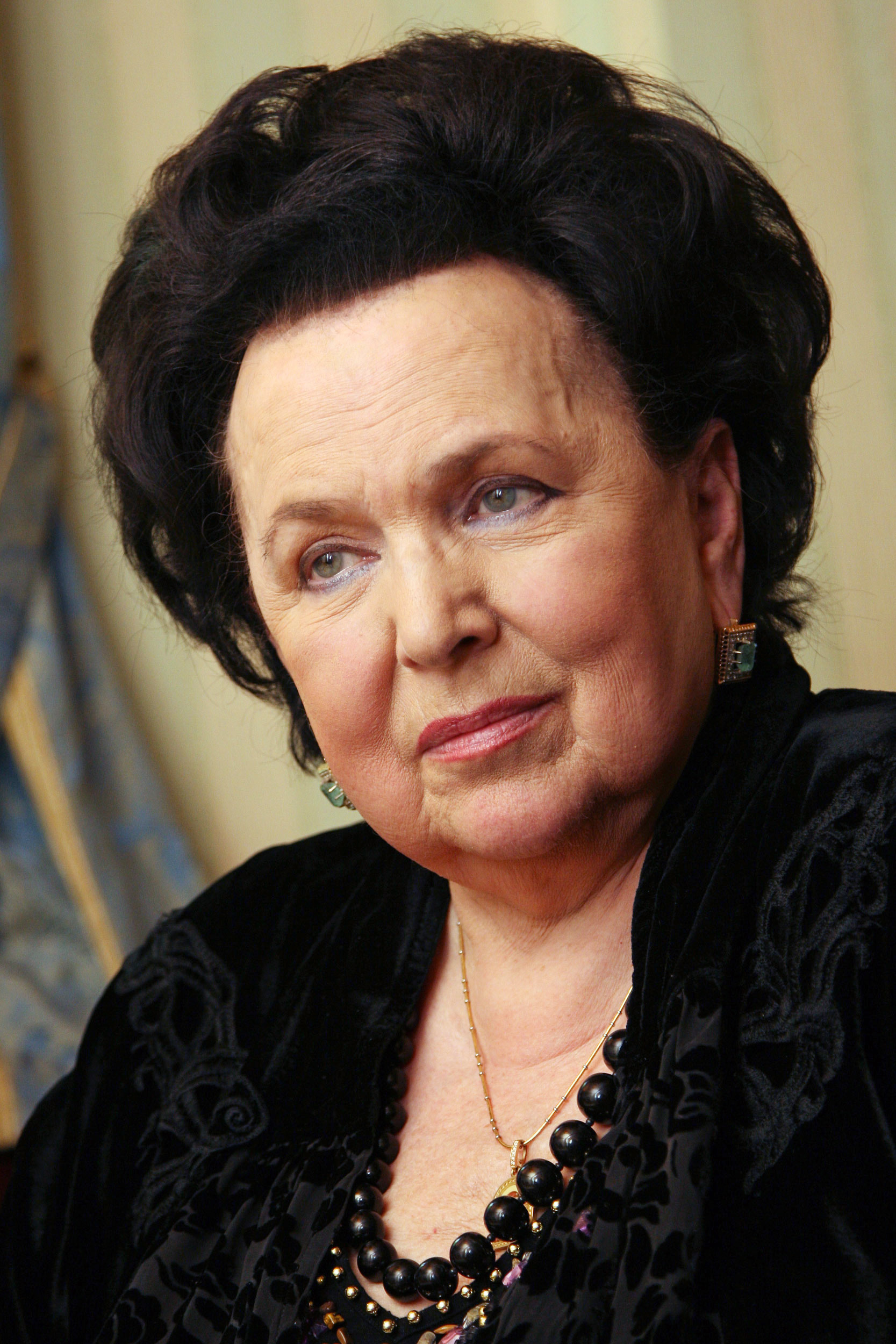
- Vishnevskaya in 2008
- Born: Galina Pavlovna Ivanova; 25 October 1926; Leningrad, Russian SFSR, Soviet Union
- Died: 11 December 2012 (aged 86); Moscow, Russia
- Occupation: Opera singer (soprano)
- Years active: 1944–1982
- Spouses: Georgy Vishnevsky (divorced) Mark Rubin (divorced) Mstislav Rostropovich (m. 1955; died 2007)
- Children: 3, including Elena Rostropovich

Galina Pavlovna Vishnevskaya (Russian: Галина Павловна Вишневская, née Ivanova, Иванова; 25 October 1926 – 11 December 2012) was a Russian soprano opera singer and recitalist who was named a People's Artist of the USSR in 1966. She was the wife of cellist Mstislav Rostropovich, and mother to their two daughters, Olga and Elena Rostropovich.

== Biography ==
Vishnevskaya was born in Leningrad (now Saint Petersburg). She made her professional stage debut in 1944 singing operetta. After a year studying with Vera Nikolayevna Garina, she won a competition held by the Bolshoi Theatre in Moscow (with Rachmaninoff's song "O, Do Not Grieve" and Verdi's aria "O patria mia" from Aida) in 1952. The next year, she became a member of the Bolshoi Theatre.

On 24 March 1957, she made her debut in Finnish National Opera as Tatyana in Eugene Onegin. On 9 May 1960, she made her first appearance in Sarajevo at the National Theatre, as Aida. In 1961, she made her Metropolitan Opera debut as Aida; the following year she made her debut at the Royal Opera House with the same role. For her La Scala debut in 1964, she sang Liù in Turandot, opposite Birgit Nilsson and Franco Corelli.

In addition to the roles in the Russian operatic repertoire, Vishnevskaya also sang roles such as Violetta, Tosca, Cio-cio-san, Leonore, and Cherubino.

Benjamin Britten wrote the soprano role in his War Requiem (completed 1962) specially for her, though the USSR prevented her from traveling to Coventry Cathedral for the premiere performance. The USSR eventually allowed her to leave in order to make the first recording of the Requiem.

Vishnevskaya was married to the cellist Mstislav Rostropovich from 1955 until his death in 2007; they performed together regularly (he on piano or on the podium). Both she and Rostropovich were friends of Dmitri Shostakovich, and they made an electrifying recording of his opera Lady Macbeth of Mtsensk for EMI. Aleksandr Solzhenitsyn, a friend and an ally in various causes, lived at their dacha for about three years from 1968, at a time when he was closely watched by the KGB and had become an official non-person; the home of the two acclaimed musicians offered safety and freedom from the risk of being spied on at home.

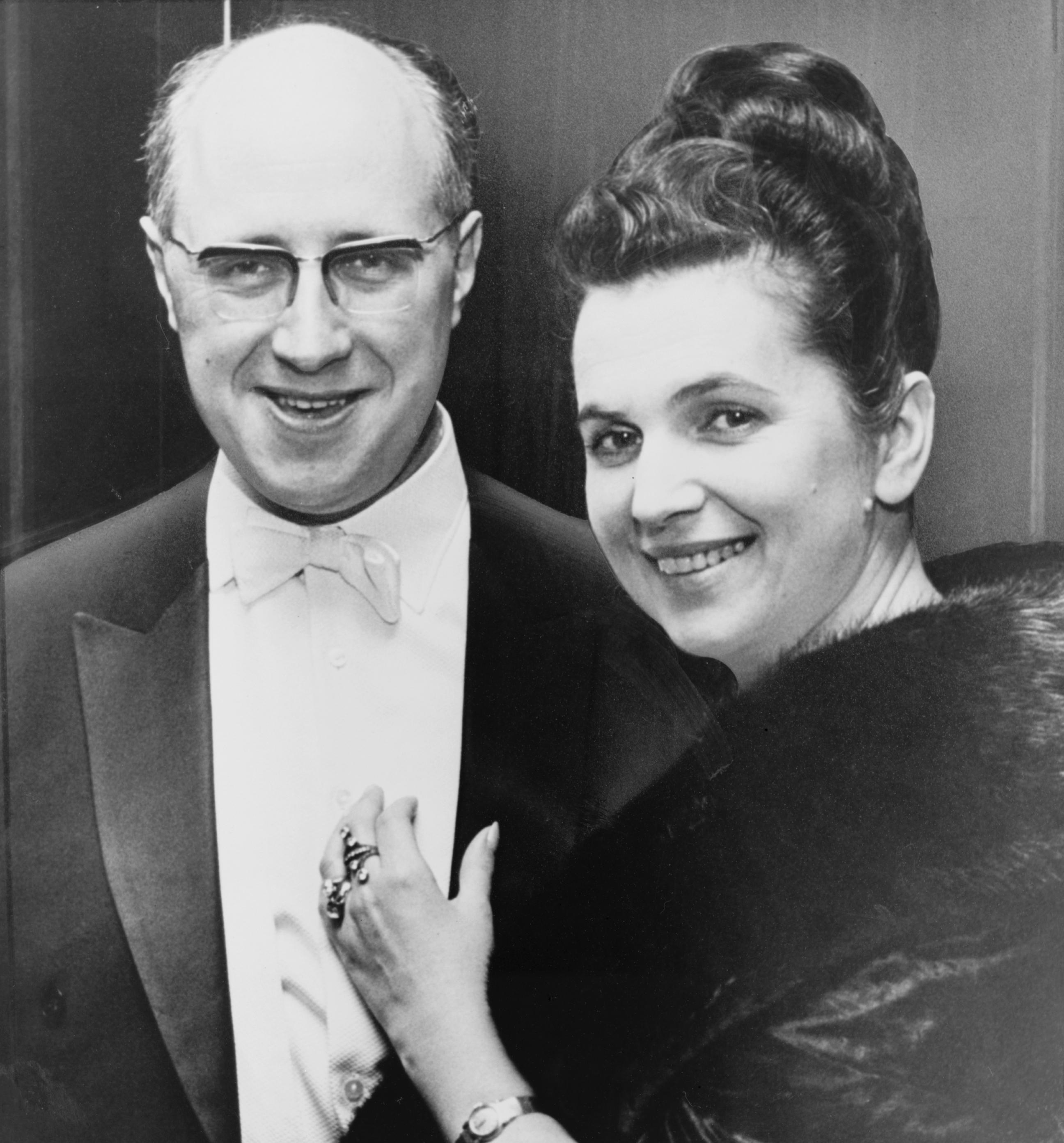
Galina Vishnevskaya with husband Mstislav Rostropovich

In 1974, the couple asked the Soviet government for an extended leave and left the Soviet Union. Eventually they settled in the United States and Paris. In 1982, the soprano bade farewell to the opera stage, in Paris, as Tatyana in Tchaikovsky's Eugene Onegin. In 1987, she stage directed Rimsky-Korsakov's The Tsar's Bride in Washington, D.C. In 1984, Vishnevskaya published a memoir, Galina: A Russian Story (ISBN 0-15-134250-4). With her husband, Mstislav Rostropovich, she founded the Rostropovich-Vishnevskaya Foundation, a publicly supported nonprofit 501(c)(3) organization based in Washington, D.C., in 1991 to improve the health and future of children in the former Soviet Union. In 2002, she opened her own opera theatre in Moscow, the "Galina Vishnevskaya Opera Centre".

In 2006, she was featured in Alexander Sokurov's documentary Elegy of a life: Rostropovich, Vishnevskaya. In 2007, she starred in his film Alexandra, playing the role of a grandmother coming to see her grandson in the Second Chechen War. The film premiered at the 2007 Cannes Film Festival. In the last week of her life, Russian President Vladimir Putin honoured her with the First Class Order of Merit for the Fatherland.

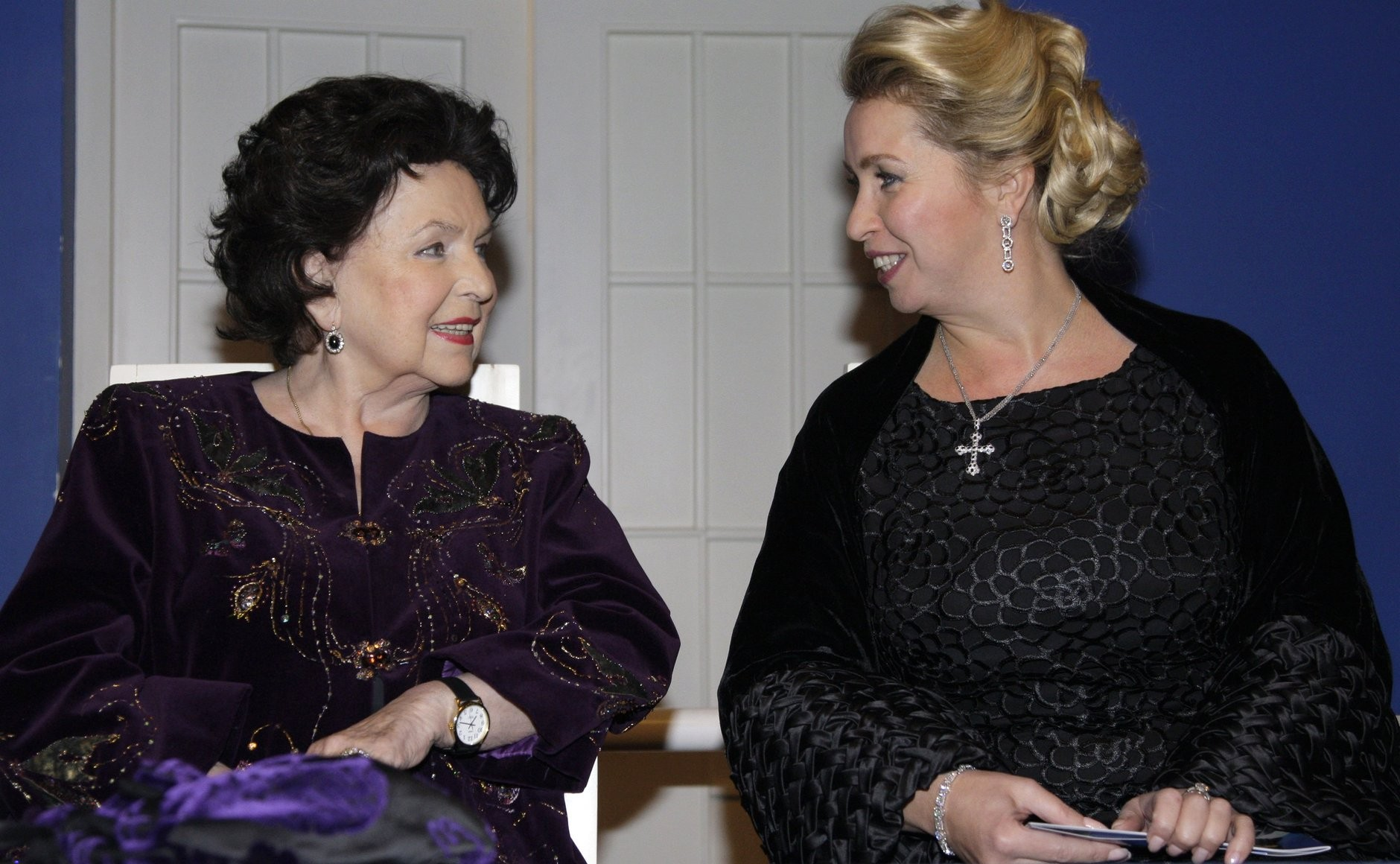
With Russian First Lady Svetlana Medvedeva, 15 October 2010

On 11 December 2012, Vishnevskaya died at the age of 86 in Moscow. She was married three times. Her first marriage was to Georgy Vishnevsky, a sailor. She retained his family name after their divorce. Her second marriage was to the violinist and director of the Leningrad Light Opera company, Mark Rubin, who also served as her manager. This second marriage produced a son, who died at age 2 months, and lasted 10 years before ending in divorce. Her daughters survive her.

== Recordings ==
Vishnevskaya made many recordings, including Eugene Onegin (1956 and 1970), Mussorgsky's Songs and Dances of Death (1961 and 1976), Britten's War Requiem (with Peter Pears and Dietrich Fischer-Dieskau, conducted by the composer; 1963), The Poet's Echo (1968), Mussorgsky's Boris Godunov (1970 and 1987), Puccini's Tosca (1976), Tchaikovsky's The Queen of Spades (with Regina Resnik, 1976), Lady Macbeth of Mtsensk (1978), Tchaikovsky's Iolanta (with Nicolai Gedda, 1984), and Prokofiev's War and Peace (1986).

== Honours and awards ==
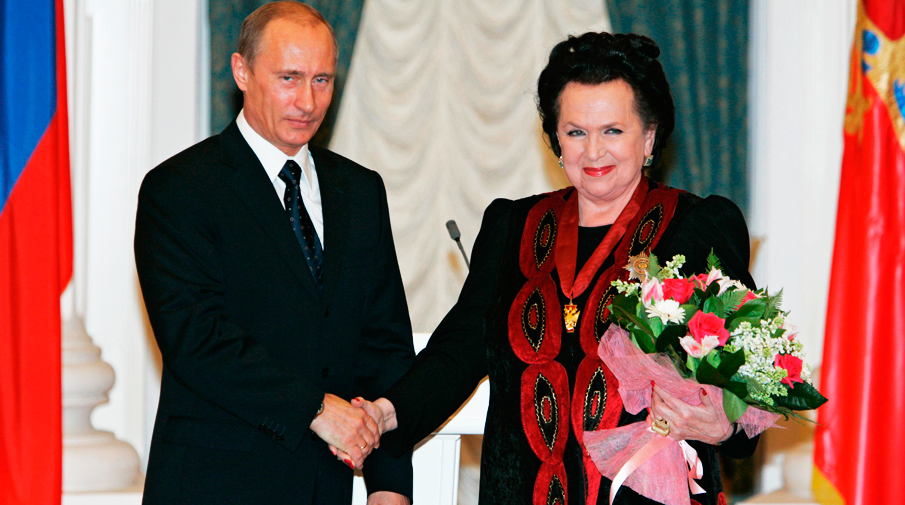
With Vladimir Putin on presentation of the Order "For Merit to the Fatherland" 2nd class, 22 February 2007

- Order of Merit for the Fatherland;
  - 1st class (1 December 2012)
  - 2nd class (18 October 2006) - for outstanding contribution to music and many years of fruitful creative activity
  - 3rd class (25 October 1996) - for great personal contribution to the development of musical art
  - 4th class (18 October 2011) - for outstanding contribution to the development of national musical culture, and many years of teaching and educational activities
- Order of Lenin (1973)
- Medal "For the Defence of Leningrad" (1943)
- Honoured Artist of the RSFSR (1955)
- People's Artist of the RSFSR
- People's Artist of the USSR (1966)
- Diamond Medal of the City of Paris (1977)
- Officer of the Order of Arts and Letters (France, 1982)
- Commander of the Legion of Honour (France, 1983)
- Doctor of Arts honoris causa, Rivier College (Nashua, New Hampshire, USA)
- Honorary Degree of Doctor of Music, Hamilton College
- Doctor of Music, St. Lawrence University (Canton, NY, USA)
- Honorary Citizen of Kronstadt (1996)
- Tsarskoye Selo Art Prize (2000)
- Honorary Professor of Moscow State University (21 November 2007)
- Order of St Princess Olga Russian Orthodox Church
- Order of St. Euphrosyne, Grand Duchess of Moscow, 2nd class (2011) - in consideration of assistance to the Russian Orthodox Church and in connection with her 85th birthday
- Order of Peter the Great (Police Academy)
- Best Actress (Russian Guild of Film Critics, 2007) - for version of "White Elephant"
- Gratitude of the President of the Russian Federation (25 October 2001) - for outstanding contribution to the development of musical art and active charity work

== Legacy ==
Vishnevskaya on a 2026 stamp of Russia

- Galina Vishnevskaya Street in the Moscow district of Novokosino. On 26 June 2013 the Moscow Government decided to assign the name Galina Vishnevskaya Street to the projected passage No. 326, located on the territory of the Novokosino district of the Eastern Administrative Okrug of Moscow between Suzdalskaya and Novokosinskaya Streets.
- Galina Vishnevskaya Street in Vidnom, Moscow region.
- The Airbus A321 airliner of the Aeroflot airline "Vishnevskaya".
- The Children's Music School No. 8 in Kronstadt is named after G. Vishnevskaya.
- A minor planet of the Solar System, No. 4919, is named after G. Vishnevskaya.
- A memorial plaque to Mstislav Rostropovich and Galina Vishnevskaya was unveiled in Moscow in 2018. It was installed in Gazetny Lane, on the house where the spouses lived.
- On 25 October 2022, the singer's birthday, a monument by sculptor Alexander Rukavishnikov and architect Mikhail Posokhin was erected next to the Opera Singing Center, which bears the singer's name (Ostozhenka str., 25, building 1) to Galina Vishnevskaya.
