= Vladimir Dmitrevsky =

Russian stage actor (1820–1871)

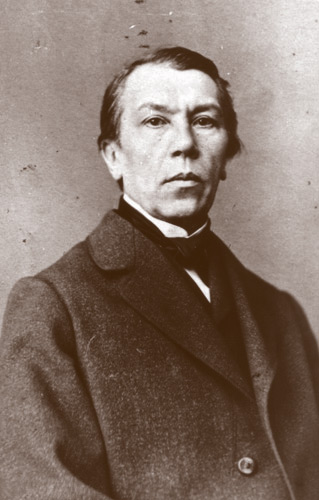
- Born: Vladimir Alexandrovich Demert; 31 July 1820; Moscow, Russian Empire
- Died: 3 February 1871 (aged 50); Moscow, Russian Empire
- Occupation: stage actor

Vladimir Alexandrovich Demert (Russian: Владимир Александрович Демерт, born 31 July 1820, died 3 February 1871) was a Russian stage actor, one of the leading figures at the Moscow's Maly Theatre, better known under his stage name Dmitrevsky (Дмитревский).

Having debuted there in 1847 (after stints with the Kazan and Kaluga troupes), he proved to be a versatile master, who excelled in all genres, giving most convincing portraits of characters belonging to different classes and cultures, in plays by Nikolai Gogol, Denis Fonvizin, William Shakespeare, Moliere, but mostly Alexander Ostrovsky. In all, he played 19 parts in Ostrovsky's plays, of which the best-received were Kuligin (The Storm, the first performer, on 16 November 1859), Ilya (Live Not as You Would Like To), Chebakov (The Marriage of Balzaminov), Vyshnevsky (A Profitable Position), Golutvin (Enough Stupidity in Every Wise Man) and Khlynov (An Ardent Heart).

Dmitrevsky stayed with Maly up until his death in 1871; he also taught at the Mikhail Shchepkin Higher Theatre School in 1856—1862.

The writer and poet Nikolai Demert (1835—1876) was his brother.
