= Rostropovich-Vishnevskaya Foundation =

- Founded: 1991
- Founder: Mstislav Rostropovich, Galina Vishnevskaya
- Type: 501(c)(3)
- Purpose: public health programs
- Location: Washington D.C.
- Website: www.rostropovich.org

The Rostropovich-Vishnevskaya Foundation (RVF) is a non-profit organization based in Washington, D.C. that supports programs to improve the health of children worldwide.

It was founded in 1991 by Mstislav Rostropovich, the world-renowned Russian cellist, and his wife, the soprano Galina Vishnevskaya. Currently, Elena Rostropovich, daughter of Mstislav Rostropovich and Galina Vishnevskaya, serves as the President of RVF. To date, RVF programs have benefited over 20 million children and young adults.

== Mission ==
RVF (Rostropovich-Vishnevskaya Foundation) promotes the health and wellbeing of children in need through sustainable, transformational public health programs in countries around the world. RVF is a non-political and non-partisan organization.

== History ==
The Rostropovich-Vishnevskaya Foundation (RVF) was known as the Vishnevskaya-Rostropovich Foundation (VRF) until 2006.

RVF was founded in 1991 by Mstislav Rostropovich and his wife Galina Vishnevskaya. Prior to 2000, the Rostropovich-Vishnevskaya Foundation primarily supplied modern medical equipment to children’s hospitals in Russia and provided advanced training to Russian doctors and nurses.

Since 2000, RVF has focused on improving public health services for children. The majority of its resources are concentrated on modernizing national childhood vaccination schedules, preventing mother-to-child transmission of diseases, and deworming school-aged children. Over 20 million individuals have benefited from RVF's health programs.

RVF successfully introduced the pneumococcal conjugate vaccine in the West Bank and Gaza, so that all newborns in both territories receive this life-saving vaccine. Local health authorities assumed full responsibility of the vaccination program in 2013, transitioning to complete local sustainability of the program. RVF launched a rotavirus vaccination program in the West Bank and Gaza in 2015.

RVF’s Hepatitis B vaccination program of adolescents and at-risk health care workers in the Russian Federation(2000–2006) became the largest public health program for youth in Russia since the collapse of the Soviet Union. Approximately 2 million individuals in 22 regions of Russia were vaccinated. The program laid the groundwork for the Russian Ministry of Health’s continuing Hepatitis B vaccination initiative.

Measles eradication and Congenital Rubella Syndrome Prevention programs initiated by RVF in Azerbaijan, Georgia, and Armenia (2004–2009) helped vaccinate millions of individuals. In December 2009 the programs in these countries completed the transition to full financing by the national ministries of health.

RVF's deworming programs in Central Asia have been conducted in close cooperation with the local Ministries of Health as well as the United States Government and have treated over 11 million children and adults.

RVF began a newborn screening program to detect and ensure prompt treatment for critical congenital heart defects (CCHDs) in 2014. CCHDs are one of the most common severe malformations in the world. In the Republic of Georgia an estimated 1,000 babies are born each year with potentially fatal heart defects. Many babies born with CCHDs appear healthy at birth, only to develop acute deterioration and die several days after leaving their birth hospitals.

== Current activities ==
RVF currently supports a rotavirus vaccination program in the West Bank and Gaza as well as addressing vaccine hesitancy in Russia, pneumococcal vaccine impact research in Russia, as well as supporting heart screening for newborns in Azerbaijan.

RVF supports children’s health programs focusing on vaccination, screening and prevention and deworming and has been active in Armenia, Azerbaijan, Georgia, Kyrgyzstan, the Russian Federation, Tajikistan and the West Bank and Gaza.

== Sustainability ==
The strategy underlying RVF programs is to create mechanisms of sustainability by strengthening the existing health care infrastructure and avoiding the establishment of parallel structures. All programs are implemented by local health professionals supported by regular training and educational seminars to ensure that each program meets international standards. Each program is designed to be self-sustaining within three to five years of inception.
