= String Quartet No. 11 (Shostakovich) =

1966 string quartet by Dmitri Shostakovich

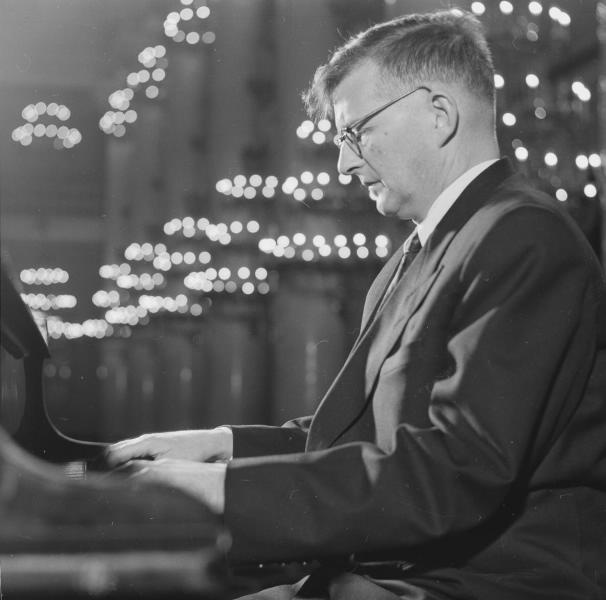
Dmitri Shostakovich playing the piano in the 1950s

Dmitri Shostakovich's String Quartet No. 11 in F minor, Op. 122 was finished on January 30, 1966, in Moscow. It was premiered by the Beethoven Quartet and is the first in a series of four quartets to be dedicated to members of the Quartet. Vasily Shirinsky was the dedicatee of the Eleventh, the quartet's second violinist, who died on August 16 of the previous year.

== Structure ==
The piece has seven movements, all of them in continuous playing, without pause:

1. Introduction: Andantino
2. Scherzo: Allegretto
3. Recitative: Adagio
4. Etude: Allegro
5. Humoresque: Allegro
6. Elegy: Adagio
7. Finale: Moderato — Meno mosso — Moderato

The quartet begins with a violin which introduces the main theme; this will be developed throughout the quartet. It is immediately followed by the second movement, always with a dialogue in two voices and adorned with glissandi; this movement's structure is similar to a canon. The second movement leads to the dissonant beginning of the third, with the whole quartet playing a series of fast notes and long, dissonant chords. The fourth movement and the fifth form a diptych in which fast melodies and repetitive motions are present. In the fourth, the first violin plays fast notes while the rest of the group plays long chords; in the fifth, the ostinato in the second violin simplifies the motion presented in the previous movement. The sixth movement is much longer and consists of long chords and short melodic lines. The last movement is a recapitulation of all the themes presented in the previous movements.

Playing time is approximately 16 minutes.
