= The Wreckers (opera) =

Opera by Ethel Smyth

Les naufrageurs (The Wreckers)
- Opera by Ethel Smyth
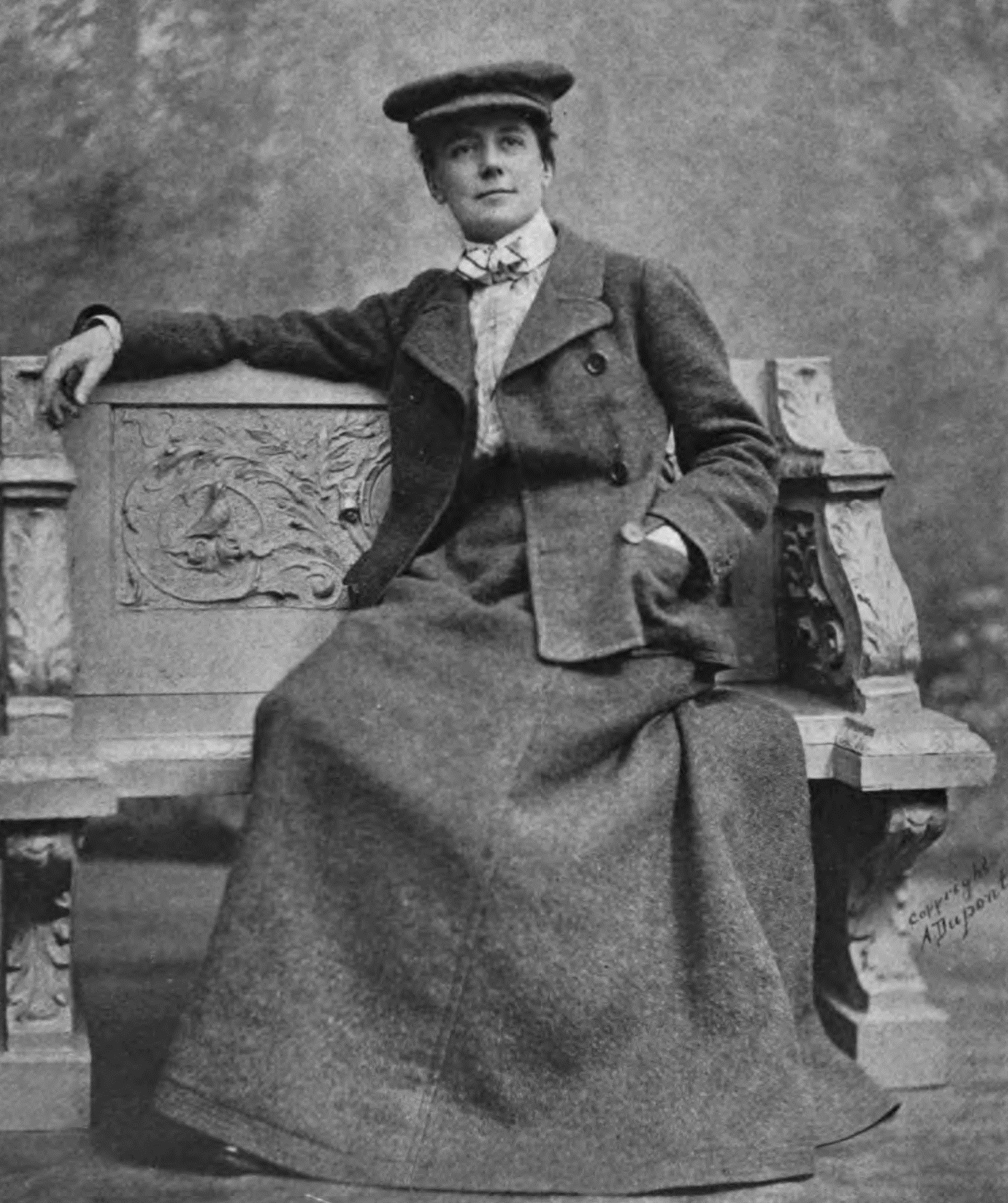
- Ethel Smyth, no later than 1903
- Librettist: Ethel Smyth; Henry Bennet Brewster
- Language: French
- Premiere: 11 November 1906; Neues Theater, Leipzig (in German)

Les naufrageurs is a French-language opera in three acts composed by Dame Ethel Smyth to a libretto by Henry Brewster, telling of the plundering of ships by Cornish villagers. Completed in 1904, it was premiered in 1906 in Leipzig in a German translation, with cuts, before being championed by Sir Thomas Beecham and given performances in 1909 in London, now in an English translation as The Wreckers prepared by the composer herself. Les naufrageurs was not performed in the language for which its music was composed until 2022, at Glyndebourne and in Berlin.

== Background ==
Tales of Cornish villagers who on stormy nights lured passing sailing ships onto their rugged coast were commonplace in the nineteenth century. The cargoes they plundered were regarded as legitimate reward for the hardships endured in this isolated and barren part of England. Therefore, when looking for a suitable theme for her third opera, it is little wonder that Smyth's thoughts should turn to this dramatic yet romantic subject. It was after a taking a walking tour in Cornwall in 1886 that the idea came to her, and for several years she visited places where the wrecking crimes were said to have been committed, interviewing anyone with evidence or memories of them. Fuller quotes from Smyth's memoirs about the pull of the subject matter:

Ever since those days I had been haunted by impressions of that strange world of more than a hundred years ago; the plundering of ships lured on to the rocks by the falsification or extinction of the coast lights; the relentless murder of their crews; and with it all the ingrained religiosity of the Celtic population of that barren promontory.

Eventually she passed her notes on to Henry Brewster, a personal friend and writer, so that he could write a libretto. American by birth, Brewster had been brought up in France, and it was agreed that the libretto should be in French, partly because Brewster was happier working in French but also because it was felt that there was a more realistic chance of the work being produced in France or Belgium than in England.

== Premiere ==
Smyth expended much energy trying to get Les naufrageurs performed. Charles Reid: "For five years Ethel Smyth, wearing mannish tweeds and an assertively cocked felt hat, had been striding about Europe, cigar in mouth, trying to sell her opera to timorous or stubborn impresarios." Eventually she secured a first performance, but in a German translation by John Bernhoff under the title Strandrecht at the Neues Theater, Leipzig, on 11 November 1906. Smyth persisted in her attempts to see it staged elsewhere, but it was not until Beecham's championing of the work that a complete staged performance was achieved, and then with funding from her friend Mary Dodge.

== Reception ==
Describing the opera in the New Grove Dictionary, Stephen Banfield notes "Its greatest strength is in its dramatic strategy, strikingly prophetic of (Britten's) Peter Grimes in details such as the offstage church service set against the foreground confrontation in Act 1." However, Amanda Holden makes the point that, musically, Smyth is "no Wagnerite, she makes use of his motivic technique, while the texture, orchestration, and even some of the music's dramatic density, show knowledge of the works of Richard Strauss ... but it also slips too readily into operatic convention."

== Performance history ==
Smyth fell back on personal contacts in Leipzig, where she had studied, to get the work performed. But it was in an inferior German translation and with severe cuts insisted upon by the conductor, Richard Hagel, particularly in the third act, which Smyth felt was turned into an "incomprehensible jumble". Nevertheless Strandrecht, or Beach Law, had a successful opening night, receiving sixteen curtain calls and general critical approval. When Hagel still refused to restore the cut material Smyth "took the extraordinary step of marching into the orchestra pit, removing all the parts and the full score … making further performances in Leipzig impossible."

=== Nikisch and Beecham ===
She took the performance materials to Prague, where she hoped for a more sympathetic production, but "the under-rehearsed performances there were a disaster." Back in England, the first performance in English took place in a non-staged, concert version at the Queen's Hall on 30 May 1908, conducted by Arthur Nikisch.

The following year, with Thomas Beecham's support, the opera was given at His Majesty's Theatre on 22 June 1909 with Clementine de Vere Sapio as Thirza, John Coates as Mark, Arthur Winckworth as Pascoe, Lewis James as Lawrence, Elizabeth Amsden as Avis and Antonie Seiter as Jack. Smyth was upset at the way Beecham conducted the rehearsals themselves, which were crammed into 10 days and nights. Beecham also included The Wreckers in his first Covent Garden season in 1910.

=== Mahler disappointment ===
In 1907 Gustav Mahler was considering the opera for a production at the Vienna State Opera, which would have been a very prestigious première for Smyth. Smyth said of Mahler, "He was far and away the finest conductor I ever knew, with the most all-embracing musical instinct, and it is one of the small tragedies of my life that just when he was considering The Wreckers at Vienna they drove him from office."

=== BBC Proms ===
Rare stage performances have taken place in England since 1939. A pivotal one was a semi-staging at the BBC Proms on 31 July 1994, in English, with Anne-Marie Owens as Thirza, Justin Lavender as Mark, Peter Sidhom as Pascoe, David Wilson-Johnson as Lawrence, Judith Howarth as Avis, Anthony Roden as Tallan, Brian Bannatyne-Scott as the Man, and Annemarie Sand as Jack, together with the Huddersfield Choral Society (chorus-master: Jonathan Grieves-Smith) and the BBC Philharmonic conducted by pioneering Smyth interpreter Odaline de la Martinez. This marked the 50th anniversary of the composer's death in 1944 and laid a foundation for subsequent performances, in particular a 2018 production by Arcadian Opera conducted by Lavender. The Prom was recorded live at the Royal Albert Hall and released on the Conifer Classics label as a double CD, and re-released by Retrospect Opera in 2018.

=== More recently ===
The Wreckers was performed by Duchy Opera at the Hall for Cornwall in 2006 to mark the opera's centenary and its first performance in Cornwall in a reduced orchestration by Tony Burke. The production was conducted by Paul Drayton and directed by David Sulkin using a libretto adapted by Amanda Holden.

The opera was given at the Stadttheater Gießen, Germany, in May 2007 under a new German title, Strandräuber, or Beach Robbers, conducted by Carlos Spierer. It also received a concert performance by the American Symphony Orchestra in September that year, marking its United States premiere. Bard Summerscape produced the opera in 2015 to critical acclaim. This was a full staging in English directed by Thaddeus Strassberger and conducted by Leon Botstein, and it was filmed. The role of Mark was sung by Neil Cooper, Thirza by Katharine Goeldner, Avis by Sky Ingram, and Pascoe by Louis Otey. A video is available on Bard's upstreaming page and on YouTube.

Three years later, in November 2018, The Wreckers was staged by Arcadian Opera at the Roxburgh Theatre, Stowe, Buckinghamshire, in England, to mark the centenary of women's suffrage in the United Kingdom and Smyth’s role in that victory. This critically acclaimed production was conducted by Justin Lavender, who had sung the role of Mark in the Proms performance and recording, and was directed by Alison Marshall. The performance was in Smyth’s own English translation; Mark was sung by Brian Smith Walters, Thirza by Jennifer Parker, Avis by April Frederick and Pascoe by Steven East.

Glyndebourne Opera opened its 2022 season with Les naufrageurs in its original French, giving several performances and filming the work. Robin Ticciati conducted. The company afterwards gave a semi-staged performance in London as its annual contribution to the BBC Proms, and Ticciati went on to conduct the opera again in Berlin still in the original language: the German premiere of Les naufrageurs.

Houston Grand Opera mounted a production in a new English translation in 2022, with Patrick Summers conducting. In the autumn of 2024, two German opera companies staged The Wreckers, only a month apart. Badisches Staatstheater Karlsruhe presented the 1909 English version, whereas the Meiningen Court Theatre's production, conducted by Killian Farrell, drew on John Bernhoff's German translation from 1906.

== Roles ==
Role (orig. French / English)	Voice type	Premiere cast, 11 November 1906, conductor: Richard Hagel
Pasko / Pascoe, the local preacher	baritone	Walter Soomer
Thurza / Thirza, his wife	mezzo-soprano	Paula Doenges
Laurent / Lawrence, the lighthouse keeper	baritone	
Marc / Mark, a young fisherman	tenor	Jacques Urlus
Avis, the lighthouse keeper's daughter	soprano	Luise Fladnitzer
Chorus: villagers and fishermen

== Synopsis ==
=== Act 1 ===
A Cornish fishing village. Sunday evening

On their way to chapel, villagers are drinking outside the tavern. Pascoe, the lay preacher, arrives and chastises them for taking alcohol on the Sabbath. He declares that this is why the Lord has stopped sending them ships to plunder. Lawrence, the lighthouse keeper, has another explanation: he has seen beacons burning on the cliffs and is certain someone is warning ships of the danger. The villagers vow to find the traitor in their midst and destroy him. Mark, one of the younger fishermen, has been courting Avis, who is the daughter of the lighthouse keeper. His affections however, have now turned towards Thirza, the young wife of Pascoe. Unaware that Avis is spying on him, he serenades his new love while the other villagers are in the chapel, and to Avis's jealous fury it is clear that his amorous feelings for Thirza are fully returned. The villagers leave the chapel inspired by Pascoe's fiery sermon to commit further bloody acts of plunder. The preacher upbraids his wife for not attending the service, but Thirza retorts that she can no longer endure life in the village and the merciless ways of the wreckers. Pascoe is left alone with his thoughts. A storm is brewing and a ship is being drawn onto the rocks. Excitedly, the men of the village anticipate the rich pickings soon coming their way. To everyone's amazement Avis returns and denounces Pascoe as the traitor who has been warning the ships of danger. The men agree to keep a close watch on the preacher as they begin their preparations for the grim work ahead.

=== Act 2 ===
A desolate seashore at the base of the cliffs

Mark is collecting flotsam and driftwood. He is in fact the one responsible for the warning beacons. Just as he is about to set light to his bonfire using the flame of his torch he hears Thirza calling. She hurries to his side and warns him that other villagers are close by and that if he lights the fire they will see the flames and come to trap him. The lovers embrace. At first Mark is intent on lighting his beacon, but when Thirza declares her love for him he stops, realizing he is putting her in danger as well as himself. Mark begs her to leave Pascoe and run away with him. She is reluctant at first, but gradually yields to his pleading. Triumphantly together they seize the torch and ignite the bonfire. Pascoe arrives just in time to see the lovers making their escape. For a moment he sees his wife's face in the moonlight and in a state of anguish collapses on the beach. He is still unconscious when Avis and the men from the village arrive. Finding Pascoe near the beacon they are certain that he is the traitor.

=== Act 3 ===
The interior of a large cave

An impromptu court has been convened and Lawrence has appointed himself as prosecutor since he was one of the men who discovered Pascoe, apparently red-handed. Pascoe refuses to acknowledge the court and ignores their questions. Avis declares that he is the victim of witchcraft, as he is clearly still under the spell of his young wife, Thirza.

The evidence seems clear. The crowd howl for Pascoe's death, but at that moment Mark bursts into their midst and confesses that he was the one who betrayed them. Thirza also steps forward to acknowledge her share of the guilt. Avis tries to save Mark by claiming he spent the night with her, but the lovers are determined to meet their fate together.

The verdict is inevitable. The lovers are to be left chained as the incoming tide gradually fills the cave. Once more Pascoe begs Thirza to repent, but she again rejects him, preferring to die with Mark. The villagers leave as the waters begin to rise and ecstatically the lovers face death in each other's arms.

== Recordings ==
- Overture to The Wreckers, recorded in 1930 by the British Symphony Orchestra with Smyth conducting, for the Columbia Graphophone Company (78 rpm: Columbia DX 287) See also British Symphony Orchestra discography.
- The Wreckers, Anne-Marie Owens, Justin Lavender, Peter Sidhom, David Wilson-Johnson, Judith Howarth, Anthony Roden, Brian Bannatyne-Scott, Annemarie Sand, with the Huddersfield Choral Society and the BBC Philharmonic, conducted by Odaline de la Martinez (CD: Conifer Classics, Recorded live at the Royal Albert Hall, 31 July 1994. Re-released by Retrospect Opera, 2018).
- Overture to The Wreckers recorded 2019 by BBC Symphony orchestra with Sakari Oramo conducting, on (Chandos records)
