= List of symphonies in G minor =

This is a list of symphonies in G minor written by notable composers.

Composer	Symphony	
Kurt Atterberg	Symphony No. 4 "Sinfonia Piccola", Op. 14 (1918, rev 1943–5)	
Johann Christian Bach	Symphony, Op. 6 No. 6, T. 264-1 (published c. 1770)	
Franz Ignaz Beck	Symphony, Op. 1 No. 1 (Callen 1, published 1758); Symphony, Op. 2 No. 2 (Callen 8, published 1760); Symphony, Op. 3 No. 3 (Callen 15, published 1762)	
Julius Benedict	Symphony, Op. 101 (1873)	
William Sterndale Bennett	Symphony No. 5 (WoO 31)	(1835–36) Symphony No. 6 Op. 43 (1864, rev 1867)
Franz Berwald	Symphony No. 1 "Serieuse" (1842, rev 1844)	
Gaetano Brunetti	Symphony No. 22 (1783)	
Adam Carse	Symphony No. 2 (c. 1908)	
Carl Czerny	Symphony No. 6, Op. posth. (1854)	
Carl Ditters von Dittersdorf	Symphony Grave g1 (by 1768)	
Joachim Nicolas Eggert	Symphony No. 4	
Ernst Eichner	Symphony, Op. 6 No. 2 (1771–72)	
Louise Farrenc	Symphony No. 3, Op. 36 (1847)	
Anton Fils	Symphony (by 1760)	
Eduard Franck	Symphony (1852-56 – lost)	
Gaspard Fritz	Symphony, Op. 6 No. 6 (after 1770)	
Gerhard Frommel	Symphony No. 2 (1944–45)	
Johann Joseph Fux	Symphony K.306 (1709)	
Niels Gade	Symphony No. 6, Op. 32 (1856-57)	
Friedrich Gernsheim	Symphony No. 1, Op. 32 (1875)	
Theodore Gouvy	Symphony, Op. 87 (pub. 1893)	
Alexander Gretchaninov	Symphony No. 5, Op. 153 (1936)	
Asger Hamerik	Symphony No. 5, Op. 36 (1889–91)	
Johan Peter Emilius Hartmann	Symphony No. 1, Op. 17 (1835)	
Joseph Haydn	Symphony No. 39 (by 1768)	
Joseph Haydn	Symphony No. 83 "La Poule" (1785)	
Andrés Isasi y Linares	Symphony No. 2 (1918)	
Vasily Kalinnikov	Symphony No. 1 (1894–5)	
Jan Kalivoda	Symphony No. 7, WoO/01 (1841)	
Paul Kletzki	Symphony No. 2 (1928)	
Leopold Koželuch	Symphony, Op. 22 No. 3, PI: 5 (1787)	
Franz Krommer	Symphony No. 7	
F.L.Æ. Kunzen	Symphony (1795?)	
Franz Lachner	Symphony No. 8, Op. 100 (1851)	
Édouard Lalo	Symphony (1886)	
Simon Le Duc	Symphony ("a tre"), Op. 2 No. 2 (1767)	
Pierre van Maldere	Symphony, Op. 4 No. 1 (pub. 1764)	
Witold Maliszewski	Symphony No. 1, Op. 8 (1902)	
François Martin	Symphony, Op. 4 No. 2 (pub. 1751)	
Étienne Méhul	Symphony No. 1 (1808–09)	
Felix Mendelssohn	String Symphony No. 12	
Ernest John Moeran	Symphony (1924–37)	
Wolfgang Amadeus Mozart	Symphony No. 25, K. 183 (1773); Symphony No. 40, K. 550 (1788)	
Nikolai Myaskovsky	Symphony No. 12, Op. 35 "Kolkhoze Symphony" (1931–32)	
Josef Mysliveček	Symphony, Op. 1 No. 5, E10:g1 (pub. 1764)	
Alberto Nepomuceno	Symphony (1893)	
Carl Nielsen	Symphony No. 1, Op. 7 (1891)	
Otto Olsson	Symphony, Op. 11 (1902)	
Karl von Ordonez	Symphony in G minor, Brown G6 (lost); Symphony in G minor, Brown G7; Symphony in G minor, Brown G8 (c. 1775)	
Gavriil Nikolayevich Popov	Symphony No. 3 "Heroic", a.k.a.. "Spanish", Op. 45 (1946)	
Cipriani Potter	Symphony No. 10 (1832)	
Joachim Raff	Symphony No. 4, Op. 167 (1871)	
Carl Reinecke	Symphony No. 3, Op. 227 (premiered 1895)	
Franz Xaver Richter	Symphony, Riemann 27 (c. 1740); Symphony No. 29 "with fugue"	
Henri-Joseph Rigel	Symphony "No. 8" (pub. 1783)	
Julius Röntgen	Symphony (1930 July)	
Antonio Rosetti	Symphony, Murray A42 (1787)	
Albert Roussel	Symphony No. 3, Op. 42 (1929–30)	
Anton Rubinstein	Symphony No. 5, Op. 107 (1880)	
Ernst Rudorff	Symphony No. 2, Op. 40 (published 1890)	
Giovanni Battista Sammartini	Sinfonia, J.-C. 56; Sinfonia, J.-C. 57; Sinfonia, J.-C. 59 (incomplete)	
Robert Schumann	Symphony "Zwickau", WoO29 (1832–33? Incomplete)	
Dmitri Shostakovich	Symphony No. 11 "The Year 1905", Op. 103 (1957)	
Johann Stamitz	Symphony ("Orchestral Trio"), Op. 4 No. 5 (pub. 1758)	
Wilhelm Stenhammar	Symphony No. 2, Op. 34 (1911–15)	
William Grant Still	Symphony No. 2 "Song of a New Race" (1936–7)	
George Templeton Strong	Symphony No. 2 "Sintram", Op. 50 (premiered 1893)	
Pyotr Ilyich Tchaikovsky	Symphony No. 1 "Winter Daydreams", Op. 13 (1866)	
Sergei Vasilenko	Symphony No. 1, Op. 10 (1904–06)	
Louis Vierne	Organ Symphony No. 4, Op. 32 (1914)	
Georg Christoph Wagenseil	Symphony, WV 418 (early 1760s)	
Johann Baptist Wanhal	Symphony, Bryan Gm1 (c. 1771); Symphony, Bryan Gm2	
Mieczysław Weinberg	Symphony No. 1, Op. 10 (1942)	
Christoph Ernst Friedrich Weyse	Symphony No. 1, DF 117 (1805)	
Joseph Wölfl	Symphony, Op. 40 (pub. 1803)	
