= Mark Bebbington =

British concert pianist

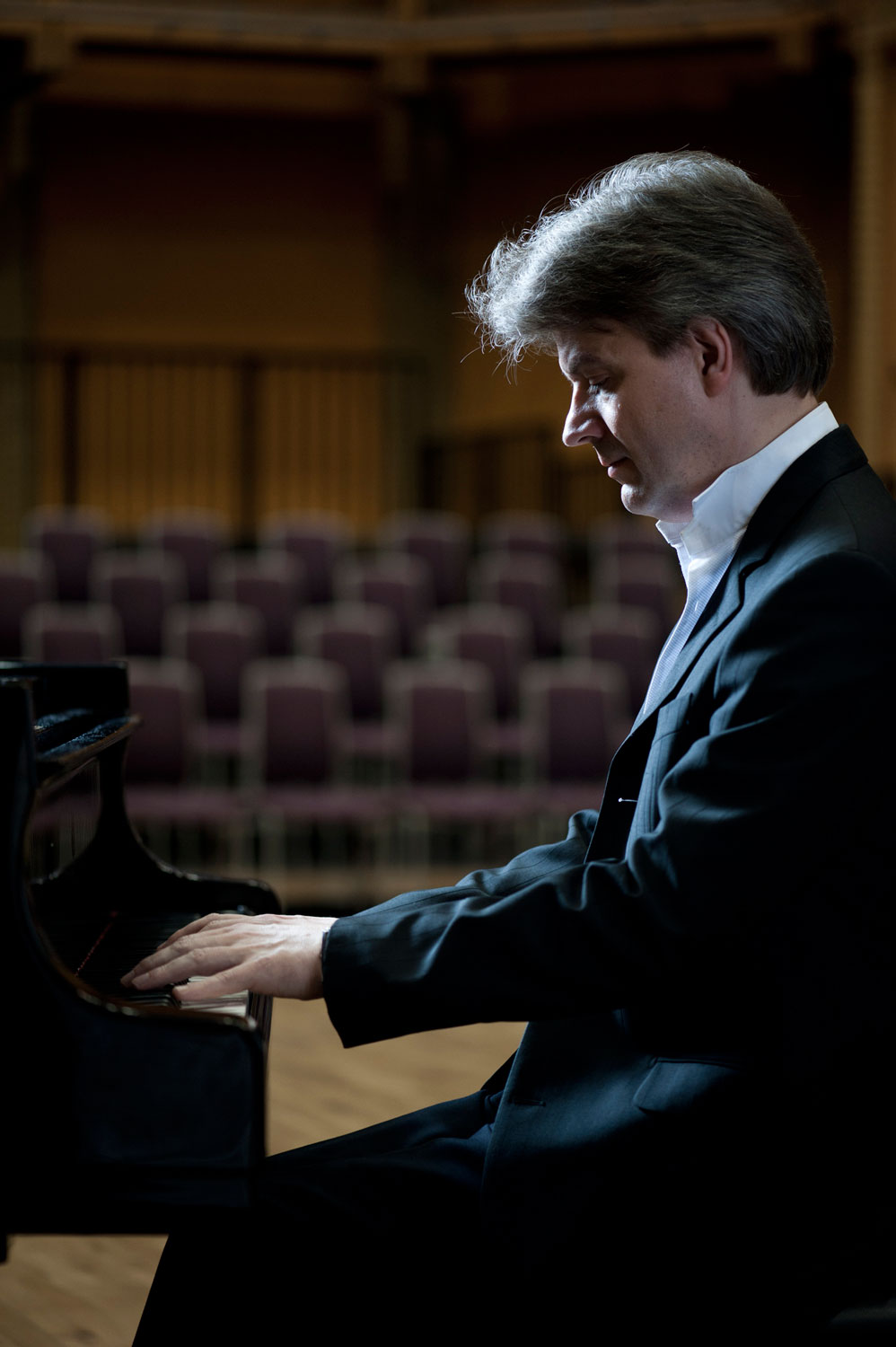
- Bebbington at the Piano
- Born: 17 January 1962 (age 64); Coventry, United Kingdom
- Education: Royal College of Music
- Occupation: Pianist

Mark Bebbington (born 17 January 1962) is a British concert pianist. He is a notable advocate of British music.

== Biography ==
Mark Bebbington studied at the Royal College of Music with Kendall Taylor and Phyllis Sellick and later in Italy with Aldo Ciccolini. As an advocate of British music, he has given premieres in concert and on CD of major works by Vaughan-Williams, Arthur Bliss, William Mathias, Ivor Gurney and John Ireland.

Mark has recorded widely for Somm label, including complete cycles of Frank Bridge and John Ireland; both of these cycles, consisting of seven CDs, have received consecutive sets of five-star reviews in BBC Music Magazine. He has also recorded works by Francis Poulenc on the Resonus Classics label, earning a Gramophone Magazine 'Editor's Choice'. In addition, Mark has the distinction of being the first pianist to be invited to record at Birmingham's Symphony Hall.

Over recent seasons, he has toured extensively throughout Central and Northern Europe, the Far East and North America, and has performed with the Czech National, Flanders, London Philharmonic, Philharmonia and Royal Philharmonic orchestras and the London Mozart Players. As a recitalist, he makes regular appearances at major UK and international festivals. Bebbington made his Carnegie Hall debut with Leon Botstein and the American Symphony Orchestra playing Richard Strauss's Parergon in 2014.
