= Leon Botstein =

American conductor, educator (born 1946)

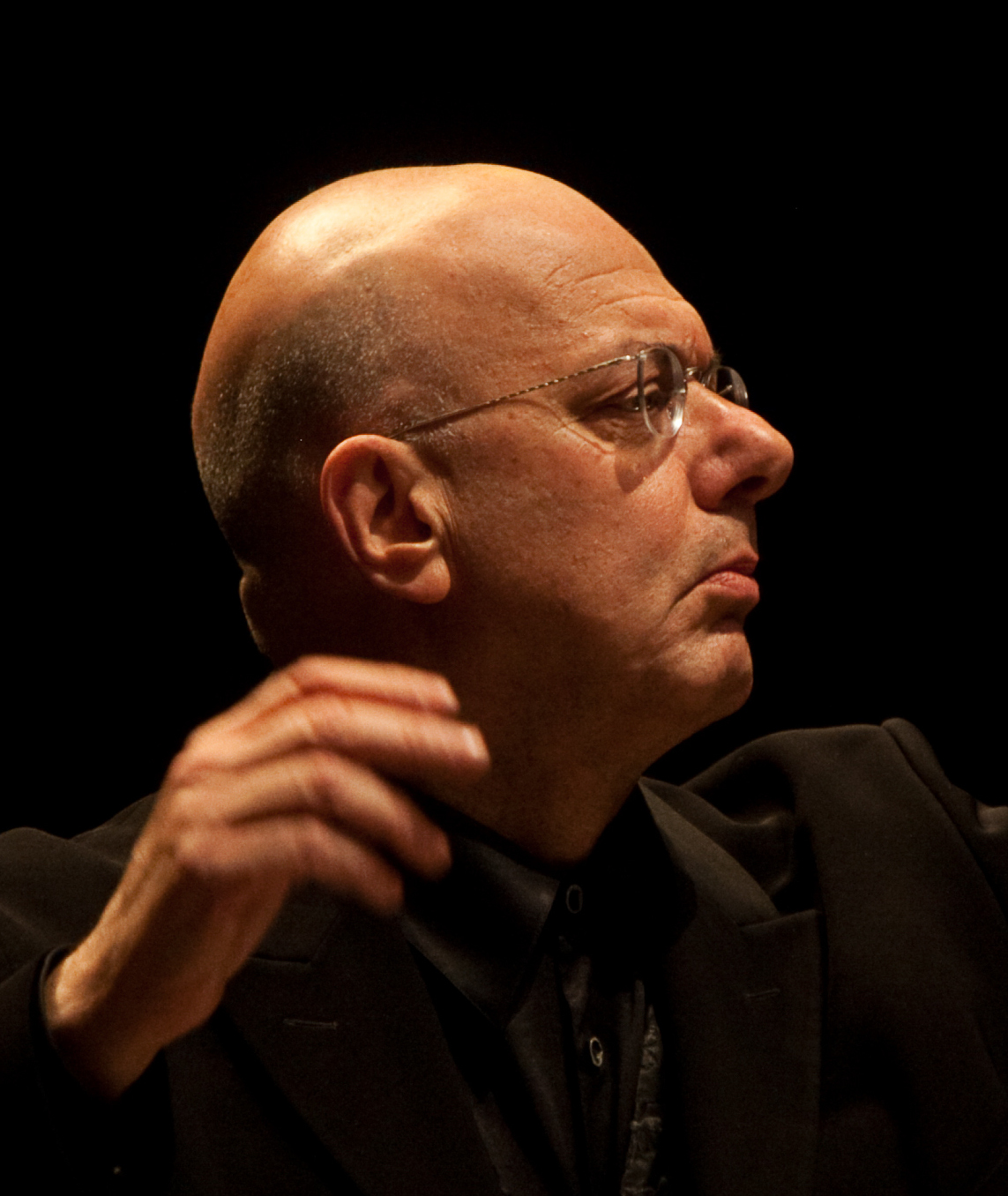
- Botstein in 2010

President of Bard College
- In office 1975–2026
- Preceded by: Reamer Kline
- Succeeded by: Jonathan Becker (acting)

Personal details
- Born: December 14, 1946 (age 79) Zürich, Switzerland
- Spouse: Barbara Haskell
- Children: 4
- Relatives: David Botstein (brother)
- Education: University of Chicago (BA); Harvard University (MA, PhD)
- Occupation: Scholar, Conductor, Educator
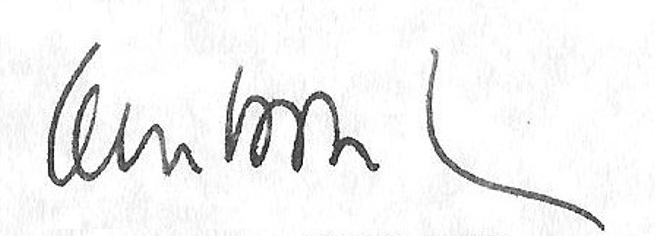
- Signature
- Website: www.leonbotstein.com

Leon Botstein (born December 14, 1946) is a Swiss-born American conductor and musicologist who was president of Bard College from 1975 to 2026. Botstein is credited with transforming Bard and significantly raising its international profile over the course of his long tenure as president. His retirement from the presidency in June 2026 was colored by revelations that he had maintained a friendly relationship with financier and child sex offender Jeffrey Epstein between 2011 and 2018. He resigned from his remaining posts at Bard in October 2026, after further scrutiny from the House Judiciary Committee.

== Early life and education ==
Botstein was born in Zürich, Switzerland, in 1946. The son of Charles and Anne, Polish-Jewish doctors who escaped Nazi persecution, Botstein moved to New York City at the age of two. His parents were faculty members at the Albert Einstein College of Medicine. He studied violin with Roman Totenberg and, during the summers, studied with faculty from the National Conservatory in Mexico City.

In 1963, at age 16, Botstein graduated from the High School of Music and Art in Manhattan. He graduated from the University of Chicago in 1967 with a bachelor's degree in history. While an undergraduate, he was concertmaster and assistant conductor of the university orchestra and founded its chamber orchestra. His music teachers in college included composer Richard Wernick and the musicologists H. Colin Slim and Howard Mayer Brown. In 1967, after studying at the Boston University Tanglewood Institute, Botstein attended Harvard University, where he studied history under David Landes, writing on musical life of Vienna in the 19th and early 20th centuries, earning an MA in 1968. At Harvard, he was the assistant conductor of the Harvard Radcliffe Orchestra and conductor of the Doctors' Orchestra of Boston.

== Academic career ==
In 1969, while a graduate student, Botstein was awarded a Sloan Foundation fellowship and began work for New York City Mayor John V. Lindsay's administration as special assistant to the president of the Board of Education of the City of New York.

=== President of Franconia College (1970–1975) ===
In 1970, at age 23, Botstein became one of the youngest college presidents in history after being appointed president of the now-defunct Franconia College in New Hampshire. He was offered the position after meeting his future father-in-law, Oliver Lincoln Lundquist, who was on the board of trustees.

Along with serving as president, Botstein was dean of the faculty, taught courses in Greek philosophy and music composition, and conducted the college's chorus. At the time, he said a college presidency should not be a lifetime career.

=== President of Bard College (1975–2026) ===
In 1975, Botstein left Franconia to become the president of Bard College. He oversaw significant curricular changes, and, under his leadership, Bard saw record gains in enrollment, campus growth, endowment, institutional reach, and high-profile faculty. Botstein directed the launch of the Levy Economics Institute, a public-policy research center, as well as graduate programs in the fine arts, decorative arts, environmental policy, and curatorial studies; soon thereafter, he helped acquire Bard College at Simon's Rock and later founded Bard High School Early College, which operates in seven cities: Newark, New York City, Cleveland, Washington D.C., Baltimore, New Orleans, and Hudson.

In the wake of the death of his second child, an 8-year-old daughter, Botstein decided to return to the musical career he had begun at University of Chicago. In 1985, he completed his Ph.D. in music history at Harvard and began retraining as a conductor with Harold Farberman, eventually leading the Hudson Valley Philharmonic Chamber Orchestra.

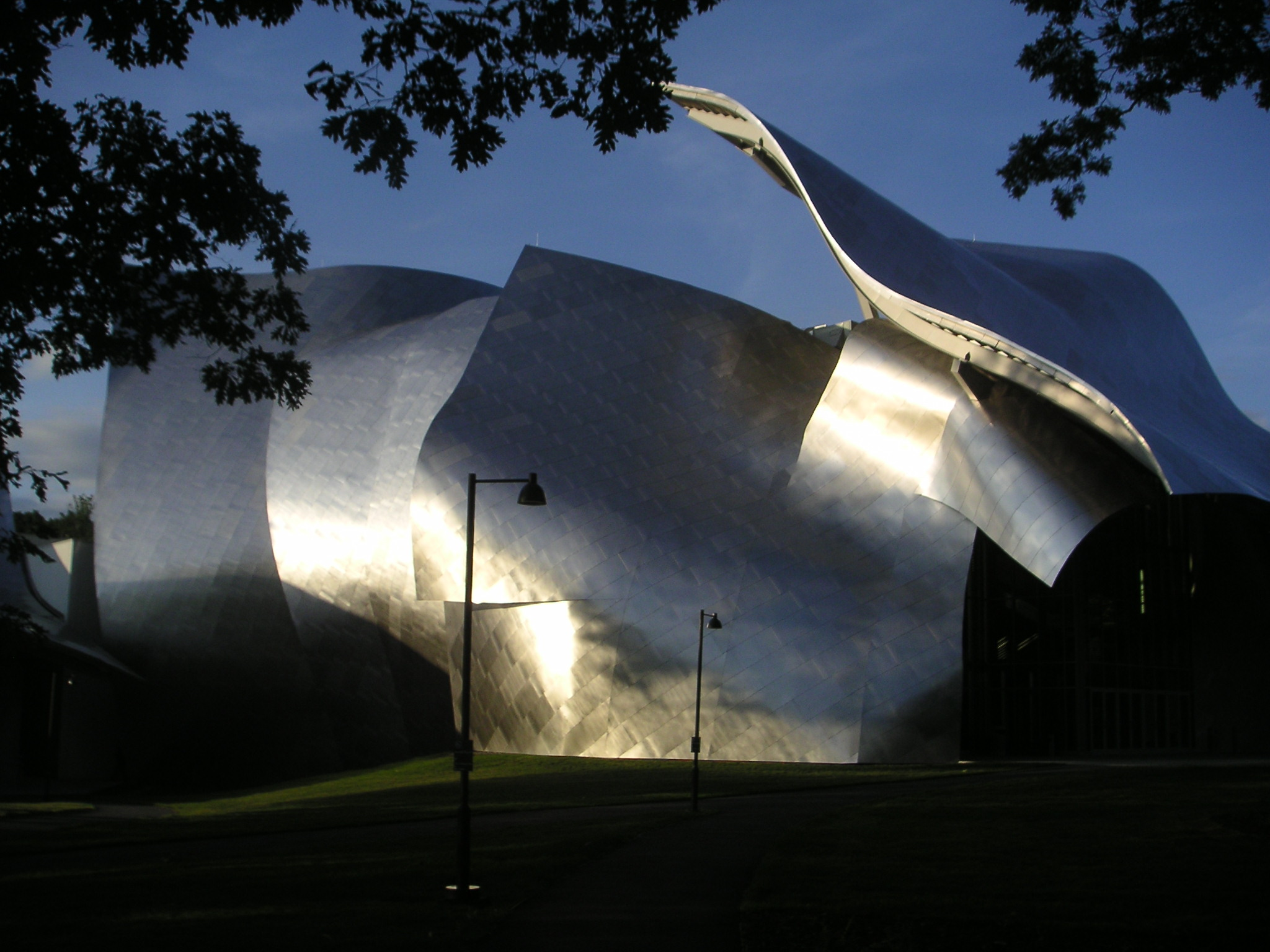
Richard B. Fisher Center for the Performing Arts

In 1990, Botstein established the Bard Music Festival, whose success led to the development of the critically acclaimed Richard B. Fisher Center for the Performing Arts, a multi-functional facility designed by Frank Gehry on the Bard campus. In 1992, in addition to being named editor of The Musical Quarterly, he was appointed director of the American Symphony Orchestra, a position he still holds. Under Botstein's directorship, the orchestra has developed a reputation for rescuing lesser-known works from obscurity. In 1999, Botstein helped establish the Bard Prison Initiative, which established college-in-prison programs across the country and is now active in nine states.

In 2003, following the success of the Bard Music Festival, Botstein developed Bard SummerScape, a festival of opera, theater, film, and music, where, since its founding, he has revived 13 rare operas in full staging. Later that year, Botstein became the music director of the Jerusalem Symphony Orchestra. His concerts with the Jerusalem Symphony Orchestra were broadcast in regular series across the U.S. and Europe, and he led the orchestra on several tours, including twice across the U.S. and to Leipzig to open the 2009 Bach Festival with a performance of Felix Mendelssohn's Elijah in Bach's Thomaskirche. In 2011, he stepped down from that post and became the Jerusalem Symphony Orchestra's Conductor Laureate and, as of 2022, also serves as its Principal Guest Conductor. In addition to his work with the ASO and JSO, Botstein has performed or recorded with, among many others, the London Philharmonic Orchestra, New York City Opera, Los Angeles Philharmonic, BBC Symphony Orchestra, London Symphony Orchestra, Buffalo Philharmonic Orchestra, St. Petersburg Philharmonic Orchestra, Mariinsky Theatre Orchestra, and NDR Symphony Orchestra. In 2005, his recording of Gavriil Popov's First Symphony with the London Symphony Orchestra was nominated for a Grammy Award.

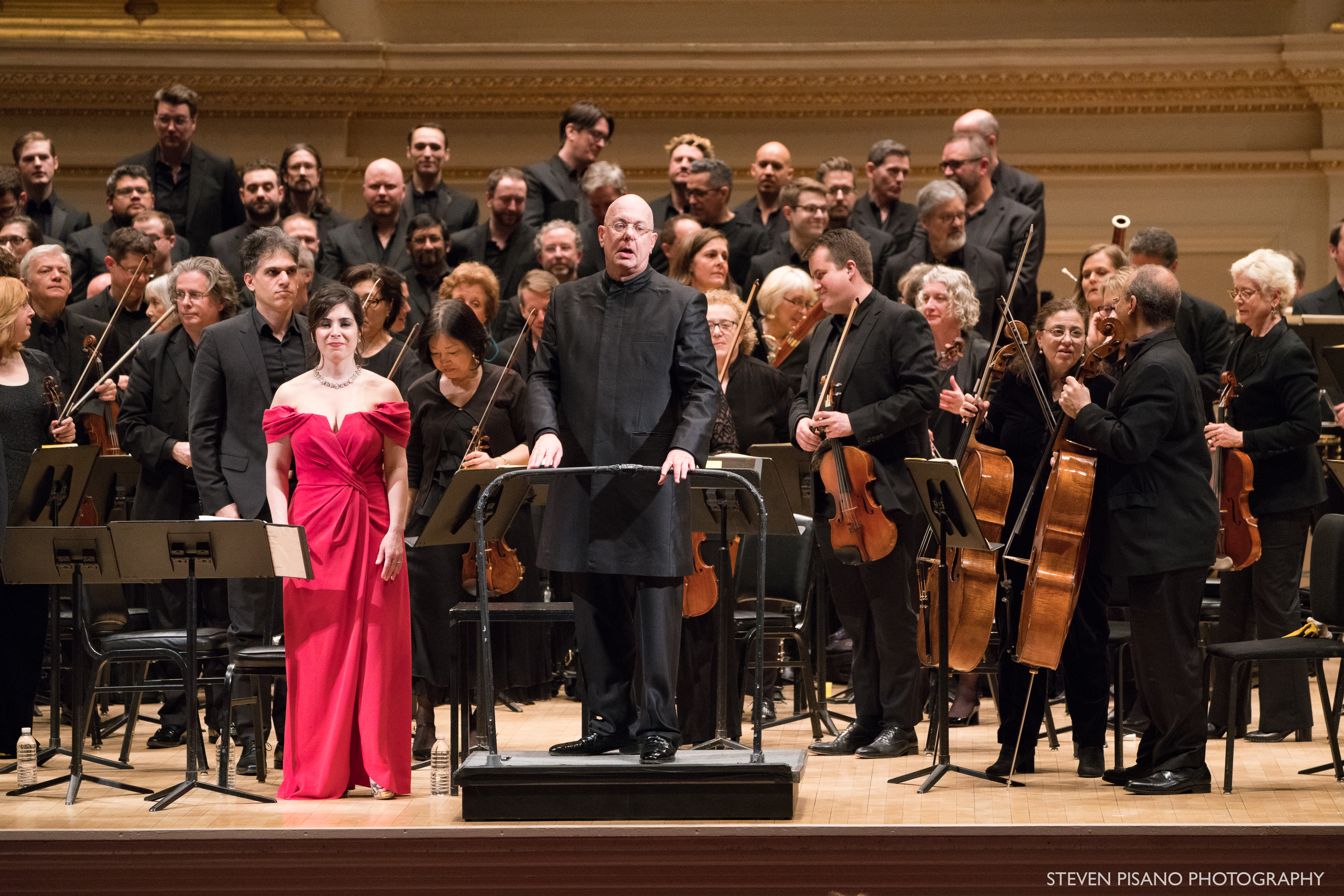
Botstein and the American Symphony Orchestra after a performance of Intolleranza by Luigi Nono at Carnegie Hall in 2018.

Throughout this period, in collaboration with institutions abroad, Botstein helped launch liberal arts programs to countries in Eastern Europe, South Africa, Central Asia, and the Middle East. He established programs with Al Quds University, American University of Central Asia, and Central European University, as well as helping found Bard College Berlin and Smolny College, Russia's first liberal arts institution.

Botstein also turned his attention to developing Bard's music program. In 2005, he oversaw the development of The Bard College Conservatory of Music and later became director of The Bard Conservatory Orchestra. During this period, he also helped Bard acquire the Longy School of Music, and led The Bard Conservatory Orchestra on tours of China, Eastern Europe, and Cuba. In addition to conducting for the Youth Orchestra of Caracas in Venezuela and on tour in Japan, Botstein also helped develop Take a Stand, a national music program in the U.S. based on principles of El Sistema. In 2015, he founded The Orchestra Now, a pre-professional orchestra and master's degree program at Bard College; in addition to performing multiple concerts each season at Carnegie Hall and Lincoln Center, The Orchestra Now performs a regular concert series at Bard's Fisher Center and takes part in Bard Music Festival concerts.

In 2018, Botstein was appointed artistic director of Campus Grafenegg in Austria, where he collaborated with Thomas Hampson and Dennis Russell Davies. On January 23, 2020, he was named chancellor of the Open Society University Network, of which Bard College and Central European University are founding members.

In 2019, Botstein appeared in the documentary College Behind Bars, a four-part television series about the Bard Prison Initiative, a degree program offered to inmates in New York prisons. The series was produced by his daughter, Sarah Botstein, who works for Ken Burns's documentary production company.

==== Relationship with Jeffrey Epstein ====
Between 2011 and 2018, Botstein maintained a relationship with financier and child sex offender Jeffrey Epstein. This relationship included a two-day visit in 2012 to Epstein's private island, Little Saint James, as well as about 25 visits to Epstein's New York City townhouse. He is on the list of people named in the Epstein files. Botstein has said he did not benefit personally from the relationship and that any money that exchanged hands was for Bard.

Botstein's relationship with Epstein began in 2011, years after Epstein was publicly known to be a sex offender, when Epstein made an unsolicited $75,000 donation to Bard High School Early College. Botstein said he engaged with Epstein in his capacity as the institution's chief fundraiser. On December 20 through December 22, 2012, Epstein hosted Botstein on Little Saint James. Botstein traveled to the island with Leon Black, Black's family, and a woman who was later identified as one of Epstein's victims. In 2026, Botstein said he had fallen sick during the trip, "kept to himself after dinner, and isolated himself in a resort-style bungalow overnight", but could not recall whether the bungalow was on the island. After the trip, Black made a donation to Bard, which Botstein "understood had been made at Epstein's behest". In February 2013, Botstein also offered to meet Epstein at a campus of Bard High School Early College; according to The New York Times, "it is not clear if the visit occurred."

In 2016, Botstein received $150,000 as a donation to Bard College from the foundation Gratitude America, which Epstein founded. At the time, Botstein was on the charity's advisory board. Botstein donated the money to Bard College as part of $1 million he gave that year; the rest of his donation came from his personal savings and earnings. Epstein also put Botstein in contact with a daughter of Woody Allen and Soon-Yi Previn so that she could attend Bard College. In early 2017, according to The New York Times, Botstein and Epstein worked together to buy a $50,000 wristwatch. Botstein continued a friendly correspondence with Epstein until December 2018, less than a year before Epstein's death.

Epstein's contact with Botstein and Bard College was known as early as April 2023, but documents related to Epstein released in 2025 and 2026 indicated that their contact had been closer than previously known. On February 19, 2026, the Board of Trustees of Bard College hired law firm WilmerHale to conduct an independent review of Botstein's connections to Epstein. A week later, Bard indefinitely postponed a gala that had been planned for March 2026 at Cipriani in Manhattan to celebrate Botstein's 50 years as president of Bard College. In March 2026, more than 160 Bard alumni, including Fergie Chambers, the son of Bard College Board of Trustees chair James Cox Chambers, called on Botstein to resign as president.

==== End of presidency ====
On April 30, 2026, the findings of WilmerHale's review were published. The review stated, "In deciding to pursue Jeffrey Epstein in 2012, President Botstein was presented with information regarding Epstein's crimes to which he pled guilty in 2008 and the related allegations against him", the nature of which would have been revealed by "a quick Internet search". It also found that Botstein's maintenance of his relationship with Epstein was challenged by a senior faculty member to no avail, and that Botstein "minimized and was not fully accurate in describing his relationship with Epstein." It concluded that, while Botstein had done nothing illegal, his relationship with Epstein "reflected on his leadership of Bard".

On May 1, Botstein announced that he would retire at the end of the 2025-26 academic year. Other sources reported that Botstein had been forced to retire by a vote of the Board of Trustees, leading Board of Trustees chair James Cox Chambers to resign. At a dinner weeks after the announcement, Botstein called the investigation into him "very sloppy and very biased", saying he "should have been given the benefit of the doubt".

=== Post-presidency ===
Botstein remained the Leon Levy Professor in the Arts and Humanities and intended to continue to live in a house on campus. He also retained his post as the principal conductor of the Bard College Conservatory of Music orchestra, The Orchestra Now, and the American Symphony Orchestra, all of which regularly perform at the Fisher Center. It was expected that he would occasionally teach in the music and history departments.

In June 2026, shortly after U.S. Representative Jamie Raskin requested that Botstein sit for an interview with the House Judiciary Committee, 28 Fisher Center staff members and dozens of former members signed an anonymous letter calling on Bard College's Board of Trustees to end "all of Leon Botstein's key leadership roles at the institution".

In August 2026, it was reported that Botstein would take a yearlong sabbatical, during which he would "focus on research and conducting".

==== Resignation ====
On October 7, 2026, Botstein resigned from his remaining teaching and conducting posts at Bard and The Orchestra Now, after the Democrats on the House Judiciary Committee delivered a letter to Bard's administration stating that Botstein "likely enabled and possibly even participated in" Epstein's abusive activities, citing an email about a victim of Epstein in which Botstein asked him whether the woman was "for me, or are you keeping her for yourself [...] I will be all the help I can to her but you need to help me." Ranking Member Jamie Raskin and Representative Madeleine Dean further alleged that Botstein personally interfered in Bard Title IX proceedings to protect alleged offenders, and that he groped women.

Botstein denied the allegations and said he would resign "to protect Bard from any distraction". Bard commissioned a cybersecurity firm to investigate the email cited in Raskin's letter. The firm's report disputed the email's authenticity.

== Scholarship and writings ==
Botstein's scholarship focuses on the intersection of music, culture, and politics since the early 19th century. He has written books in both German and English.

Botstein also writes frequently on primary and secondary education and universities: in addition to the book Jefferson's Children: Education and the Promise of American Culture (1997), he is the author of numerous articles on education in the United States.

Botstein has been editor of The Musical Quarterly since 1993. He frequently contributes to periodicals focusing on music and history.

== Musicianship ==
Botstein is renowned for reviving and promoting neglected repertoire and composers. In addition, as director of the American Symphony Orchestra and the Jerusalem Symphony Orchestra, he emerged as a significant proponent of "thematic programming", which assembles concert programs around common themes grounded in literature, music history, or art. He is also known for the series "Classics Declassified", in which he lectures, conducts, and takes questions from the audience. Both the Bard Music Festival and Bard SummerScape continue his method of reviving neglected works and synthesizing performance and scholarship. The Wall Street Journal's Barrymore Laurence Scherer wrote, "the Bard Music Festival…no longer needs an introduction. Under the provocative guidance of the conductor-scholar Leon Botstein, it has long been one of the most intellectually stimulating of all American summer festivals and frequently is one of the most musically satisfying. Each year, through discussions by major scholars and illustrative concerts often programmed to overflowing, Bard audiences have investigated the oeuvre of a major composer in the context of the society, politics, literature, art and music of his times."

Botstein's essays for the Bard Music Festival were published as a series by Princeton University Press.

== Personal life ==
Botstein is the brother of biologist David Botstein and pediatric cardiologist Eva Griepp.

He is the husband of art historian Barbara Haskell. They have two children.

Botstein and his first wife, Jill Lundquist, had two children. The elder is producer Sarah Botstein. The younger, Abigail Lundquist Botstein, was fatally hit by a car in October 1981, shortly before her eighth birthday. She is buried in the Bard Cemetery.

== Awards ==
Year	Title
2018	Honorary Doctor of Science, Watson School of Biological Sciences, Cold Spring Harbor Laboratory
2017	Honorary Doctor of Humane Letters, Goucher College
2016	Honorary Doctor of Music, Sewanee: The University of the South
2015	Lifetime Achievement Award - YIVO Institute for Jewish Research
2015	The Deborah W. Meier Hero in Education Award - Fairtest
2014	Caroline P. and Charles W. Ireland Distinguished Visiting Scholar Prize - University of Alabama at Birmingham
2013	Jewish Cultural Achievement Award - The Foundation for Jewish Culture
2013	Kilenyi Medal of Honor - The Bruckner Society of America
2012	The University of Chicago Alumni Medal
2010	Elected to the American Philosophical Society
2009	Carnegie Academic Leadership Award - The Carnegie Corporation, for outstanding leadership in curricular innovation, reform of K-12 education and promotion of strong links between their institution and their local community.
2006	Popov's Symphony No. 1 and Shostakovich's Theme and Variations with the London Symphony Orchestra - nominated for a Grammy Award in the category of Best Orchestral Performance.
2003	Award for Distinguished Service to the Arts from the American Academy of Arts and Letters
2001	Austrian Cross of Honor for Science and Art
1996	Harvard Centennial Medal by the Harvard Graduate School of Arts and Sciences to recipients of graduate degrees from the School for their "contributions to society".
1995	National Arts Club Gold Medal

== Books ==
- Botstein, Leon. The History of Listening: How Music Creates Meaning. New York, NY: Basic Books.
- Botstein, Leon (2013). Von Beethoven zu Berg: Das Gedächtnis der Moderne. Zsolnay.
- Botstein, Leon (2011). Freud und Wittgenstein Sprache und menschliche Natur. Vienna: Picus Verlag.
- Botstein, Leon (2004). Vienna: Jews and the City of Music. Princeton, NJ: Princeton University Press. ISBN 978-1931493277.
- Botstein, Leon, ed. (1999). The Compleat Brahms: A Guide to the Musical Works of Johannes Brahms. New York, NY.
- Botstein, Leon (1997). Jefferson's Children: Education and the Promise of American Culture. New York, NY: Doubleday. ISBN 0-385-47555-1.
- Botstein, Leon (1991). Judentum und Modernität : Essays zur Rolle der Juden in der deutschen und österreichischen Kultur, 1848 bis 1938. Vienna: Böhlau. ISBN 3-205-05358-3.

== Selected recordings ==
- (2025) Gil Shaham, Leon Botstein, The Orchestra Now, Premieres: "Birds of America," "Nigunim," "Let Fly," Canary Classics.
- (2024) Exodus: Kaufmann • Rubin • Tal. The Orchestra Now. Avie Records.
- (2022) George Frederick Bristow and William Henry Fry. Classics of American Romanticism. The Orchestra Now, Bridge Records
- (2021) Arthur Honnegger, Dimitri Mitropoulos, and Othmar Schoeck. Buried Alive. The Orchestra Now, Bridge Records.
- (2020) Arthur Honegger, Dimitri Mitropoulos, and Othmar Schoeck. The Orchestra Now. Bridge.
- (2020) Erich Wolfgang Korngold, Frederic Chopin, and Nikolai Rimsky-Korsakov. The Orchestra Now with Orion Weiss. Bridge.
- (2019) Arthur Bliss, Edmund Rubbra, and Arnold Bax. The Orchestra Now with Piers Lane. Hyperion.
- (2018) Ferdinand Ries. Piano Concertos No. 8 & 9. The Orchestra Now with Piers Lane. Hyperion.
- (2016) George Gershwin. Gershwin: Rhapsody in Blue, Piano Concerto in F, Variations on "I Got Rhythm," Eight Preludes for Solo Piano. Royal Philharmonic Orchestra with Mark Bebbington. SOMM Recordings.
- (2015) Paul Hindemith. The Long Christmas Dinner. American Symphony Orchestra. Bridge Records.
- (2012) Luigi Dallapiccola. Volo Di Notte. American Symphony Orchestra.
- (2009) Bruno Walter. Symphony No. 1. NDR Symphony Orchestra, Hamburg. CPO
- (2008) Béla Bartók. Concerto for Orchestra, Four Orchestral Pieces, Hungarian Peasant Songs. London Philharmonic Orchestra. Telarc.
- (2008) John Foulds. A World Requiem. BBC Symphony Orchestra. Chandos.
- (2007) Paul Dukas. Ariane et Barbe-Bleue. BBC Symphony Orchestra. Telarc.
- (2005) Ernest Chausson. Le roi Arthus. BBC Symphony Orchestra. Telarc.
- (2004) Gavril Popov: Symphony No. 1, Op. 7, Dimitri Shostakovich: Theme & Variations, Op. 3. London Symphonic Orchestra. Terlarc. Nominated for a Grammy Award in Best Orchestral Performance.
- (2005) Aaron Copland, Roger Sessions, George Perle, and Bernard Rands. Works by Copland, Sessions, Perle, and Rands. American Symphony Orchestra. New World Records.
- (2003) Richard Strauss. Die Ägyptische Helena. American Symphony Orchestra with Deborah Voigt. Telarc.
- (2003) Franz Liszt. Dante Symphony. London Symphony Orchestra. Telarc.
- (2000) Richard Strauss. Die Liebe der Danae. American Symphony Orchestra. Telarc.
- (1999) Karl Amadeus Hartmann. Symphonies No. 1 & No. 6. London Philharmonic Orchestra with Jard Van Nes. Telarc.
- (1998) Anton Bruckner. Symphony No. 5. (Schalk Edition). London Philharmonic Orchestra. Telarc.
- (1998) Ernst von Dohnányi. Symphony No. 1. London Philharmonic Orchestra. Telarc.
- (1995) Franz Schubert. Franz Schubert Orchestrated. American Symphony Orchestra. Telarc.
- (1993) Johannes Brahms. Serenade No. 1 In D. American Symphony Orchestra and Chelsea Chamber Ensemble. Vanguard.
- (1991) Joseph Joachim. Overture To Hamlet, Overture To Henry IV, Violin Concerto In D Minor In The Hungarian Manner. London Philharmonic Orchestra with Elmar Oliveira. IMP.
