= Thaddeus Strassberger =

American opera director (born 1976)

Thaddeus Strassberger (born 1976) is an American, Italian and Cherokee Nation citizen who works as an opera director and scenic, costume, lighting and video designer in over fifteen countries around the world.

== Biography ==
Born in 1976, to parents of Cherokee, Irish and German descent, Strassberger grew up in Tulsa, Oklahoma and is a citizen of the Cherokee Nation. He is also an Italian citizen. He graduated from Booker T. Washington High School in 1994, and in 2016 was inducted into the school's Hall of Fame. He went on to earn a bachelor's degree from The Cooper Union for the Advancement of Science and Art in New York City. He won a Fulbright Fellowship which enabled him to study at La Scala in Milan from 2000 to 2001 where he graduated from the Accademia Teatro alla Scala with a diploma in scenic design realisation. During the first several years of his career he worked as an assistant director for opera productions at the Teatro di San Carlo in Naples, La Fenice in Venice, the Teatro Lirico di Cagliari, the Badisches Staatstheater Karlsruhe, the Houston Grand Opera, Pittsburgh Opera, Michigan Opera Theatre, and Santa Fe Opera among others. In 2005, he was awarded the European Opera Directing Prize by Opera Europa for his work on Opera Ireland's production of Rossini's La Cenerentola.

=== Career as opera director and designer ===
In 2005, Strassberger directed a new production of Giuseppe Verdi's Rigoletto for Opera Colorado and restaged the Badisches Staatstheater's production of Michael Nyman's Man and Boy: Dada at the National Theatre in Prague. In 2007, he directed the rarely mounted Rossini opera La gazzetta at the Rossini in Wildbad festival, a production which was recorded by Naxos Records for release on DVD starring Michael Spyres. That same year he was the director and scenic designer for the Lyric Opera of Kansas City's production of Aida, Theater Augsburg's production of Christoph Willibald Gluck's Orfeo ed Euridice, and Hessisches Staatstheater Wiesbaden's mounting of La Cenerentola.

In 2008, Strassberger was the director for Wolf Trap Opera's production of Richard Strauss's Ariadne auf Naxos and was the director and scenic designer for Opéra de Montréal's production of Giacomo Puccini's La fanciulla del West, and Arizona Opera's production of La traviata. He also served as the director for Arizona Opera's mounting of Wolfgang Amadeus Mozart's The Magic Flute, an opera he had previously directed at both Utah Opera and Madison Opera in 2006.

During the 2009/2010 season, Strassberger directed Mozart's Le nozze di Figaro at the Norwegian National Opera, Giacomo Meyerbeer's Les Huguenots at the Bard SummerScape festival, and Hector Berlioz's Les nuits d'été at Opera Azuriales. He also worked as both director and scenic designer for Puccini's Turandot at Theater Augsburg and Ambroise Thomas's Hamlet at the Washington National Opera conducted by Plácido Domingo.

In 2010/2011, he returned to the Norwegian National Opera to direct and design The Rape of Lucretia and made his Austrian debut with the Tyrolean State Theatre with a new production of La fanciulla del West, while in 2012 he directed Nabucco for the Washington National Opera, a production which has subsequently been seen in Philadelphia, Minnesota, Montreal, Miami and in 2017 with the Los Angeles Opera, starring Liudmyla Monastyrska, Plácido Domingo, and Morris Robinson, conducted by James Conlon. The production was presented in Valencia at the Palau de las Arts with Plácido Domingo and Anna Pirozzi.

His work with Bard SummerScape in the New York Hudson Valley has featured six rare operas:

- 2009: Les Huguenots
- 2010: Der ferne Klang
- 2012: Le roi malgré lui
- 2013: The Oresteia
- 2015: The Wreckers
- 2018: Demon

In 2014, he directed Satyagraha, the first opera by Philip Glass to be produced in Russia, at the Ekaterinburg State Academic Opera. The production was nominated for five Golden Mask awards, including Best Production and Best Director. It won the 2016 Critics' Prize for Best Director and additionally the production won the prize for Best Chorus. Also in Ekaterinburg, his production of Weinberg's The Passenger was the first to be performed in the original Russian edition. It has been nominated for four Golden Mask awards, including Best Production and Best Director. His Royal Opera House Covent Garden production of I due Foscari starring Plácido Domingo, Maria Agresta, and Francesco Meli and conductor by Antonio Pappano is available on DVD. It was a co-production with Los Angeles Opera, Palau de les Arts Reina Sofía, Valencia, and Theater an der Wien.

In 2016, he directed the premiere of David T. Little and Royce Vavrek's opera JFK for the Fort Worth Opera, a co-commission with Opéra de Montréal.

His production of La clemenza di Tito for Los Angeles Opera in March 2019 was featured in Opera News magazine. Strassberger made his debut at the NCPA Beijing in August 2019 with the Asian premiere of Puccini's La fanciulla del West. A new production of Puccini's Turandot was scheduled to premiere in the summer of 2020 at Oper im Steinbruch St. Margarethen, but was postponed to 2021 due to the COVID-19 pandemic. It was broadcast live on ORF television.

Since 2011, he has created six new productions for the Tiroler Landestheater in Innsbruck, including: La fanciulla del West, Pique Dame, The Tales of Hoffmann, Un Ballo in Maschera, Werther and Boris Godunov.

In 2021, he served as Creative Director for the Opening Ceremonies Parade of the Riyadh Season in Saudi Arabia. The event, produced by Balich Wonder Studio and Saudi Arabia's General Entertainment Authority was attended by over 300,000 people and was broadcast live on national television.

In 2022, he directed and designed a completely immersive production of Salome for Tulsa Opera.

== His approach to the repertoire ==
Opera News magazine featured Strassberger in its Next Wave feature in August 2012.:

Strauss and Hofmannsthal, Verdi and Solera — even going back to da Ponte and Mozart — you feel as if everyone is in this constant state of gloom and doom: the theaters are shutting down next year, the quality isn't what it was, we don't have the voices we used to have. When Verdi presented the score of Nabucco to Bartolomeo Merelli, they said, 'There's no budget.' Verdi said, 'I've got Strepponi and the whole cast,' and they said, 'You'll have to use sets from the warehouse,' and Verdi said, 'That's all right. Let's get it onstage.' That's no different from an American company saying you have to rub two sticks together to get the production on because our NEA budget got cut this year.

In the June 2012 issue of the British magazine Opera which examined recent repertoire trends which reveal a move towards the rare and unusual, Strassberger makes the following observation regarding the staging of some of them:

I love these works and they give me the freedom to turn up as a director and put them on stage without having to un-engineer what people thought they were going to be. The audience can focus on what they are experiencing rather than making comparisons with the past.

=== Work with opera singer training programs ===
Strassberger has also served on several programs for opera singers in training. In 2006, he joined the faculty of the International Vocal Arts Institute (IIVA) in Tel Aviv where he directed the school's opera productions for two years. He has also directed operas at the IIVA in Chiari, Lombardy, Italy, and for the Opera Theatre of Lucca. In 2019, he works with Banff Centre's Opera in the 21st Century developing a new work, Silent Light, with Paola Prestini and Royce Vavrek. In 2019, he directed Tobias Picker's 1996 opera Emmeline in a substantially updated production approved by the composer himself.
