= Orestia =

Orestia may refer to:

- Orestis (region), an ancient region of Epirotic Macedonia
- The old name for Edirne, a city in Turkey
- The Oresteia, a trilogy of Greek tragedies written by Aeschylus
- Oresteia (opera), a Russian-language opera by Sergei Taneyev
- Orestia (beetle), a genus of flea beetles
