= List of compositions by Sergei Taneyev =

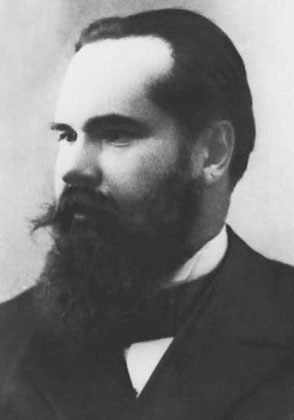
Sergey I. Taneyev

Musical compositions of the Russian composer Sergei Taneyev (1856–1915)

== Orchestral ==
- Symphony (No. 1) in E minor (1873-4, published 1948) (edited by Pavel Lamm)
- Piano Concerto (1876, published 1957) in E♭ (2 movements only. Completed by Pavel Lamm and Vissarion Shebalin)
- Symphony (No. 2) in B♭ (unfinished - 3 movements only) (1877)
- Overture on Russian Themes in C (Song No. 10 from Rimsky-Korsakov's Song Collection, Op.24) (1882) (completed by Pavel Lamm, published in 1948)
- Symphony (No. 3) in D minor (1884, published 1947)
- Oresteia, overture for orchestra, Op. 6 (1889, a symphonic poem based on themes from the opera)
- Symphony No. 4 in C minor, Op. 12 (1901) (the only numbered symphony Taneyev published)
- Concert Suite for violin & orchestra, Op. 28 (1909) (five movements: Prelude, Gavotte, Fairy Tale, Theme & Variations, Tarantella)

== Chamber and instrumental music ==
- String Trio in D major (1879/1880)
- Choral varié in A major for organ (1894?)
- String Quintet No. 1 in G for 2 violins, viola and 2 cellos, Op. 14 (1900-1901)
- String Quintet No. 2 in C for 2 violins, 2 violas and cello, Op. 16 (1904)
- Piano Quartet in E major, Op. 20 (1906)
- String Trio in D for 2 violins and viola, Op. 21 (1907)
- Piano Trio in D for violin, cello and piano, Op. 22 (1908)
- Prelude and Fugue for piano in G♯ minor, Op. 29 (1910)
- Prelude in F major (1894-1895)
- Piano Quintet in G minor, Op. 30 (1911)
- String Trio in E♭ major for violin, viola and viola-tenore, Op. 31 (1911); Viola-tenore is pitched one octave below the violin.
- Violin Sonata in A minor (1911)
- String Trio in B minor (1913)

== String quartets ==
(in chronological order)

- String Quartet, D minor, 1874–6 (2 movements completed)
- String Quartet (No. 7), E♭, 1880
- String Quartet (No. 8), C, 1882–3
- String Quartet (No. 9), A, 1883
- String Quartet No. 1, B♭ minor, Op. 4, 1890
- String Quartet No. 2, C, Op. 5, 1894–5
- String Quartet No. 3, D minor, Op. 7, 1886, rev. 1896
- String Quartet No. 4, A minor, Op. 11, 1898–9
- String Quartet No. 5, A, Op. 13, 1902–3
- String Quartet No. 6, B♭, Op. 19, 1903–5
- String Quartet, C minor, 1911 (2 movements only)

== Choral ==
- John of Damascus ("A Russian Requiem"), Op. 1, for 4 part mixed chorus and orchestra (1884)
- Choruses, Op. 35, to words by Konstantin Balmont
- At the Reading of a Psalm, cantata, Op. 36 (1915)

about 25 collections of religious and folk choruses

== Opera ==
- Oresteia (opera), (1887–1894)

== Vocal ==
- 10 Romances, Op. 17
- (more than 60 other songs)

== Sources ==
- David Brown, "Sergey Ivanovich Taneyev", Grove Music Online, grovemusic.com, ed. L. Macy (accessed February 10, 2006), (subscription access).
- David Brown, Sergey Ivanovich Taneyev, in 'The New Grove Dictionary of Music and Musicians, ed. Stanley Sadie, 1980, ISBN 0-333-23111-2
- Sleeve notes, Complete String Quartets of Sergei Taneyev, 5 CDs, Northern Flowers, St. Petersburg
