= Gavriil Popov =

Gavriil Popov may refer to:

- Gavriil Popov (composer) (1904–1972), Soviet Russian composer
- Gavriil Kharitonovich Popov (born 1936), Russian politician
