= Richard B. Fisher Center for the Performing Arts =

Performance hall

Fisher Center at Bard
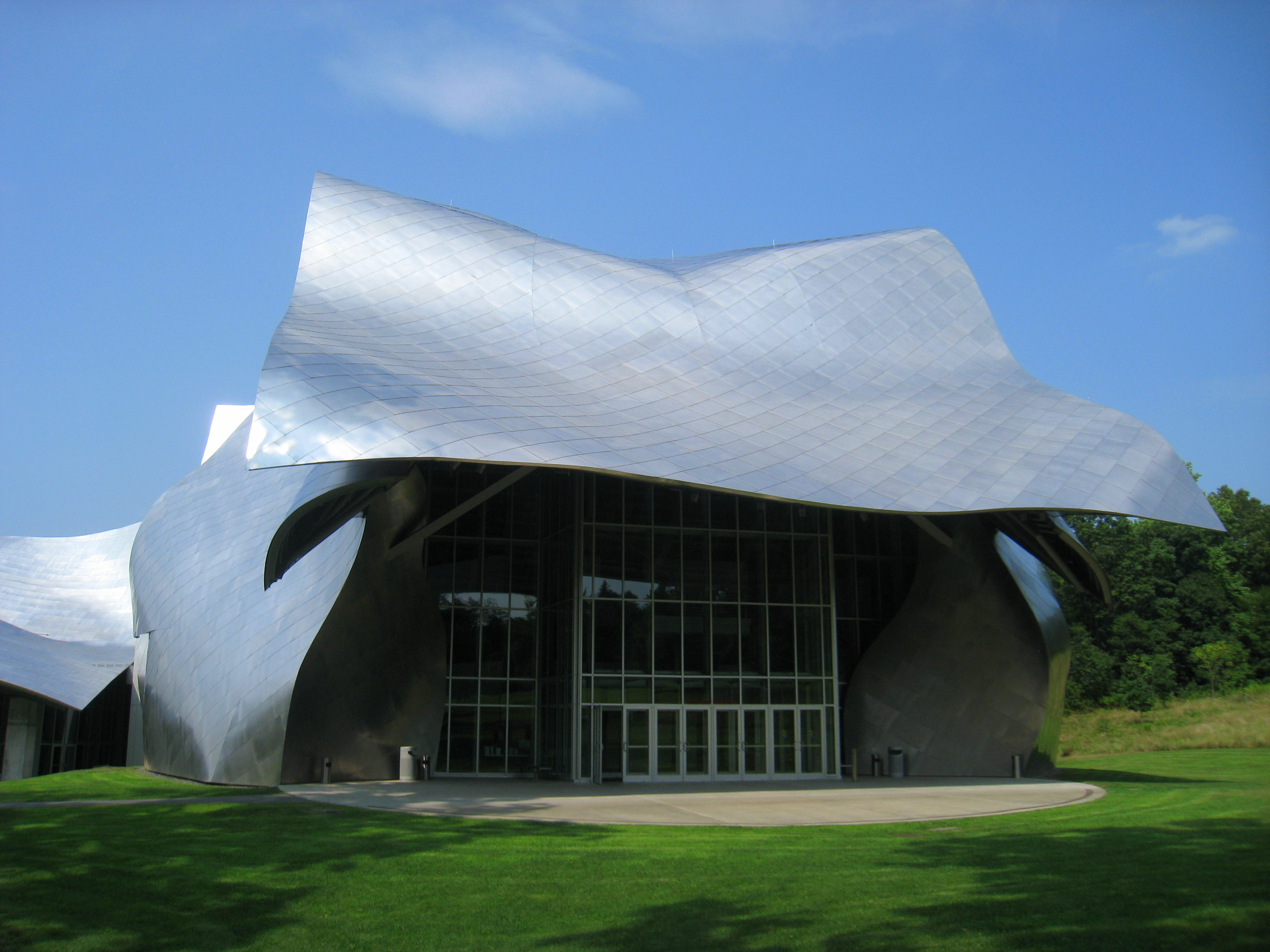
- South (front) elevation, 2009
- Interactive map of Fisher Center at Bard
- Address: 60 Manor Ave. Annandale-on-Hudson, New York; United States
- Coordinates: 42°01′52.81″N 073°54′09.55″W
- Owner: Bard College
- Capacity: Sosnoff Theater: 900; LUMA Theater: Adjustable
- Type: Performing arts center

Construction
- Opened: 2003
- Architect: Frank Gehry
- Structural engineers: DeSimone Consulting Engineers; Cosentini Associates
- Main contractor: Daniel O'Connell's Sons

Website
- fishercenter.bard.edu

The Richard B. Fisher Center for the Performing Arts at Bard College is a performance hall located in the Hudson Valley hamlet of Annandale-on-Hudson, New York. The center provides audiences with performances and programs in orchestral, chamber, and jazz music, and in theater, dance, and opera. Designed by architect Frank Gehry, the 110,000-square-foot (10,000 m^{2}) center houses two theaters, four rehearsal studios for dance, theater, and music, and professional support facilities. The building's heat and air-conditing systems are entirely powered by geothermal sources, enabling the Fisher Center to be fossil fuel free during standard operations. The total cost of the project reached $62 million and took three years to complete, opening in April 2003. The New Yorker calls it "[possibly] the best small concert hall in the United States."

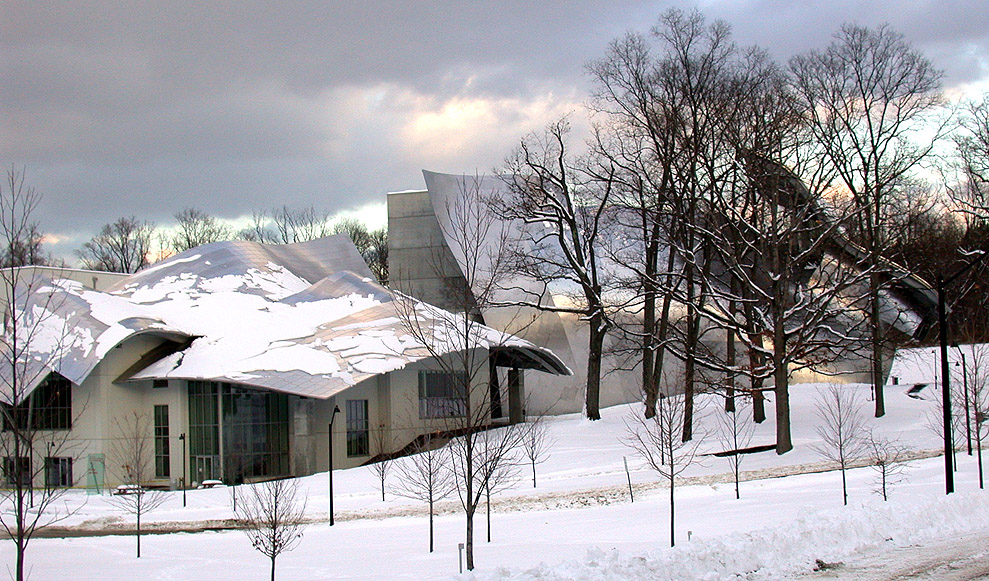
West profile in winter 2005

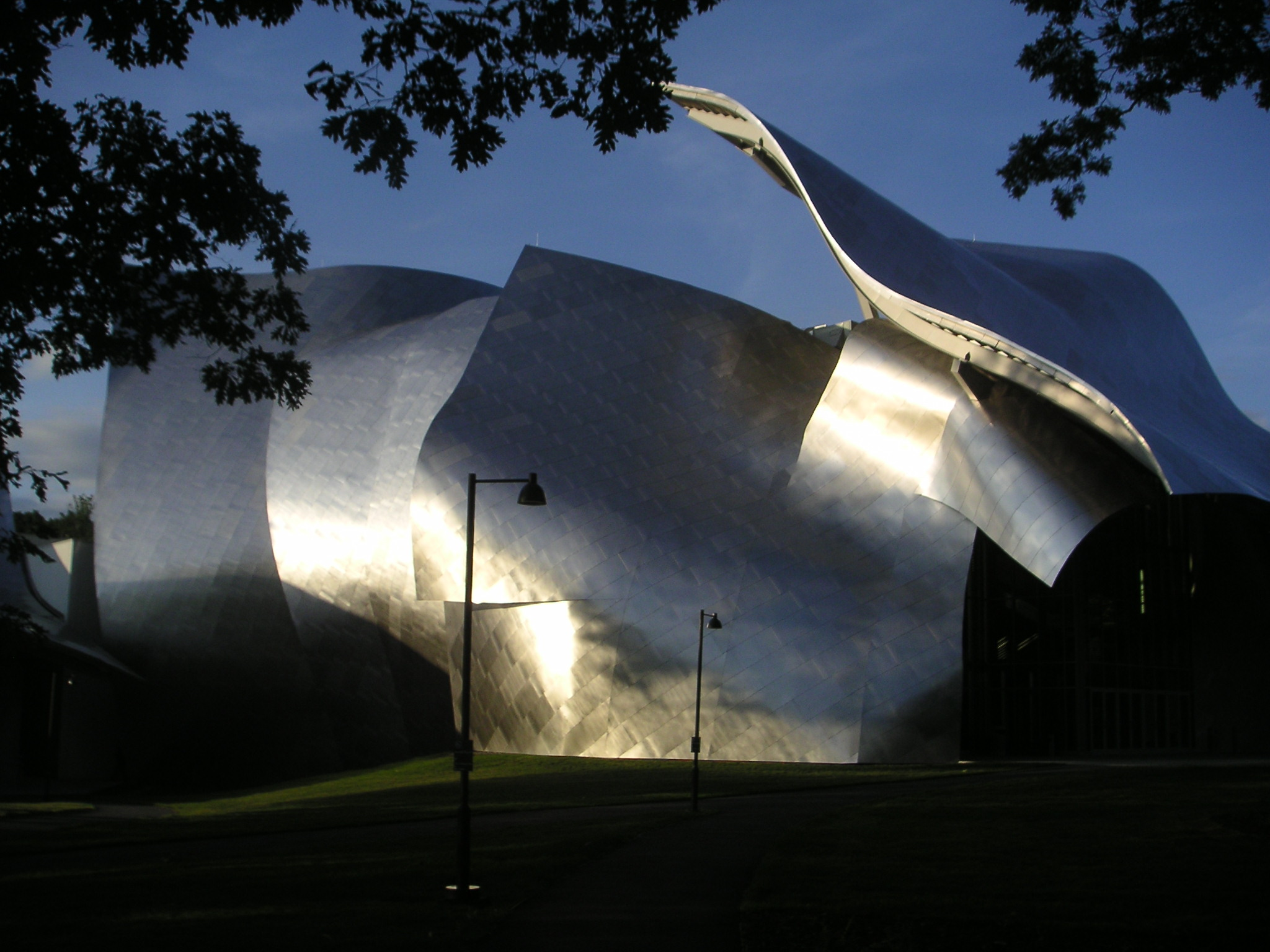
Summertime view

The Sosnoff Theater, an intimate, 900-seat theater with an orchestra, parterre, and two balcony sections, features an orchestra pit for opera and acoustics designed by Yasuhisa Toyota, including an acoustic shell that turns the theater into a concert hall for performances of chamber and symphonic music.

The smaller of the two theaters is the flexible 200-seat LUMA Theater, which houses Bard's Theater and Dance Programs during the academic year.

The Fisher Center is also the home of the Bard Music Festival, hosting companies from around the world during Bard SummerScape, a festival of opera, theater, and dance. The Performing Arts Center is primarily devoted to teaching and college events during the academic year and used as a public performing-arts facility and venue for the college's graduate programs in the arts during the summer months.

== See also ==
- Richard B. Fisher namesake of the hall, chairman emeritus of Morgan Stanley and former chair of Bard's Board of Trustees.
- Leon Botstein President of Bard College
- Gideon Lester Artistic Director and Chief Executive
- List of works by Frank Gehry
- Walt Disney Concert Hall
- The organization of the artist
- List of concert halls
- Guggenheim Museum Bilbao
