= Opera Europa =

Opera Europa is the international service organisation for professional opera companies and opera festivals in Europe. It is incorporated in Brussels as a not-for-profit organisation.

With roots going back to 1995, Opera Europa gained its present format and name in 2002, on the merger of the European Opera Network and the Eurolyrica associations. It had 233 member companies in 44 different countries as of October 2023.

== Activities ==
For the benefit of its member companies, it runs forums, databases, a quarterly newsletter, and twice-yearly conferences, and offers reciprocal membership benefits with Opera America.

=== European Opera Days ===
Opera Europa co-ordinates the annual European Opera Days when opera companies across Europe open their doors to the general public, with opera house tours, open rehearsals, talks and special events (both in and outside the conventional spaces). The first European Opera Days were held in 2007, and since then have taken place each year on the weekend closest to the EU's Europe Day, 9 May.

=== Opera Platform ===
Opera Europa is the lead partner behind the Opera Platform, a service launched in May 2015 to offer free live streams of operas via the web. The three-year project to stream one free production every month received half of its 3.9 million euro budget from the European Union's Creative Europe programme, the other half coming from the 15 opera companies providing the content. The Franco-German TV network Arte is providing the technological platform.

The Opera Platform won the Accessibility category in the 2016 edition of the International Opera Awards. In 2017, the Opera Platform became the free streaming service OperaVision.

=== European Opera-directing Prize (EOP) ===
Since 2001, in collaboration with the Camerata Nuova e.V. in Wiesbaden, Germany, Opera Europa supports a biennial competition, the European Opera-directing Prize (EOP, in German: Europäischer Opernregie-Preis) for young opera directors and design teams up to the age of 35. The total prize money is 42,500 euros, supplied by Camerata Nuova, with 20,000 euros for the winning concept and have their production mounted by a European opera company.

Year	Opera	Winning team	Premiere	Sponsoring company
2001	Fidelio (Beethoven)	Matthias Lutz (dir), Julia Hansen (design)	29 April 2002	Hessisches Staatstheater, Wiesbaden
2003	Hans Heiling (Marschner)	Andreas May (dir), David König (design)	28 February 2004	Opéra national du Rhin, Strasbourg
2005	La Cenerentola (Rossini)	Thaddeus Strassberger (dir, sets), Mattie Ullrich (costumes)	22 April 2006	Opera Ireland, Dublin
2007	Rusalka (Dvořák)	Johannes Gleim (dir), Daniela Juckel (design)	30 March 2008	Latvian National Opera, Riga
2009	La finta giardiniera (Mozart)	Anna Dirckinck-Holmfeld (dir), Sibylle Wallum (design)	1 April 2010	Stadttheater Bern
2011	I Capuleti e i Montecchi (Bellini)	Sam Brown (dir), Annemarie Woods (design)	27 September 2012	As.Li.Co., Como and tour
2013	Cavalleria rusticana (Mascagni) and Pagliacci (Leoncavallo)	Second prize; first prize not awarded		Stadttheater Klagenfurt
2015	Weiße Rose (Udo Zimmermann)	Joint first prize: Niki Ellinidou (dir), Nefeli Myrtidi (design)	22 October 2016	Oper Köln
2015	Weiße Rose (Udo Zimmermann)	Anna Drescher (dir), Hudda Chukri (design)	4 November 2016	Theater Orchester Biel Solothurn
2016	La traviata (Verdi)	Andrea Bernard (dir); Elena Beccaro, Alberto Beltrame (design)	October 2017	Festival Verdi, Teatro Giuseppe Verdi, Busseto

== Sources ==
- Opera Europa website
- Camerata Nuova e.V., Wiesbaden website (in German)
