= Symphony No. 1 (Tchaikovsky) =

1866 musical work by Pyotr Ilyich Tchaikovsky

- Winter Daydreams
- by Pyotr Ilyich Tchaikovsky
- Tchaikovsky as a composition teacher
- Key: G minor
- Opus: 13
- Composed: 1866
- Dedication: Nikolai Rubinstein
- Duration: About 45 minutes
- Movements: Four
- Scoring: Orchestra

Premiere
- Date: 15 February 1868
- Location: Moscow
- Conductor: Nikolai Rubinstein

Pyotr Ilyich Tchaikovsky wrote his Symphony No. 1 in G minor, Winter Daydreams (or Winter Dreams) (Russian: Зимние грёзы, Zimniye gryozy), Op. 13, in 1866, just after he accepted a professorship at the Moscow Conservatory: it is the composer's earliest notable work. The composer's brother, Modest Ilyich Tchaikovsky, asserted that the symphony's creation from beginning to end cost his sibling more labor than any other works and even involved considerable suffering. Even so, he remained fond of it throughout his life. Tchaikovsky wrote to his patroness Nadezhda von Meck in 1883 that he believed, "although it is in many ways very immature," he still knows that "yet fundamentally it has more substance and is better than any of my other more mature works."

Tchaikovsky dedicated his first symphony to his contemporary musician Nikolai Rubinstein, who as both a close friend and as a pianist of note helped with the former figure's career aspirations. He began writing it while experiencing considerable alienation and dealing with extreme fatigue, with his graduation from the St. Petersburg Conservatory and initial efforts at composition failing to provide the creative opportunities that he had hoped for. Work proved sluggish. This aggravation became compounded by how Tchaikovsky found it impractical if not impossible to come up with a whole symphony of the inherent quality he demanded of himself under the strict attitudes towards form and function, at the level of unreasonable imitation in his opinion, held by other Russians as both teachers and peers.

While composing such a dramatically ambitious work ravaged both his mental state and physical health, particularly given the suffocating ethos of the conservative and even formalist musicians around him, the symphony received acclaim from both popular audiences and professionals alike after its release. This has continued over the course of many years, and it has remained significantly lauded in large part due to its structural inventions in the context of Russian music during the middle to late 1800s. Writing for the British mass media publication The Guardian in 2014, music journalist Tom Service argued that "Tchaikovsky's first symphony remodelled the form into a truly Russian style" in a way that beyond "staking out territory that his five other symphonies continued to explore" additionally serves as "one of the most irresistibly attractive first symphonies ever written". Service added that the composer's skills particularly shine through given how certain sections involve "Tchaikovsky proving a point" about the fact "that he knew all the tricks in the academic book" while Tchaikovsky still incorporated certain boldly distinct musical elements, with the symphony's final movement striking listeners such as himself given its "irresistibly over-the-top conclusion".

== Form ==
1. Dreams of a Winter Journey. Allegro tranquillo (G minor)
2. Land of Desolation, Land of Mists. Adagio cantabile ma non tanto (E-flat major)
  This movement has an essentially monothematic structure, based on subtle gradations and variations on a single melody. This melody is taken from the "Poco Meno Mosso" section of his first Symphonic Poem, The Storm.
3. Scherzo. Allegro scherzando giocoso (C minor)
  This was the earliest movement to be written. Salvaged from the third movement of a piano sonata that he had written as a student, Tchaikovsky transposed the movement down a semitone to C minor and replaced the trio with the first of a whole line of orchestral waltzes.
4. Finale. Andante lugubre - Allegro maestoso (G minor → G major)
  Tchaikovsky uses the folk-song "Распашу ли я млада, младeшенка" (Raspashu li ya mlada, mladeshenka) as the basis for both the introduction and the second subject (in B minor). This song also colors the vigorous first subject. Tchaikovsky had borrowed the folk-song motive into the prelude and the finale of his Cantata for the Opening of the Polytechnic Exhibition in Moscow 1872 (commemorating the bicentenary of the birth of Peter the Great). Tchaikovsky, in the recapitulation, restates the movement's introduction, instead of the secondary theme. The movement ends with a vigorous coda.

== Instrumentation ==
The symphony is scored for piccolo, two flutes, two oboes, two clarinets (A, B♭), two bassoons, four horns (E♭, F), two trumpets (C, D), three trombones (fourth movement only), tuba (fourth movement only), timpani, cymbals, bass drum and strings.

== Overview ==
=== Composition ===
Tchaikovsky started writing this symphony in March 1866. Work proved sluggish. A scathing review by César Cui of the cantata he had written as a graduation piece from the St. Petersburg Conservatory shattered his morale. He also composed day and night. All these factors strained Tchaikovsky's mental and physical health tremendously. He started suffering from insomnia, from pains in his head which he thought to be strokes, and became convinced he would not live to finish the symphony. A successful performance of his revised Overture in F in St. Petersburg lifted his spirits. So did a change of scenery for the summer with his family. Nevertheless, he soon worked himself again into nervous and physical exhaustion by continuing to compose day and night. A doctor declared him "one step away from insanity," ordering complete rest. Tchaikovsky complied.

Despite his lack of progress, Tchaikovsky sought the opinion of his former teachers, Anton Rubinstein and Nikolai Zaremba, when he returned to St Petersburg at the end of August. He had hoped for their approval of what he had written as well as accepting at least part of it for a St Petersburg concert of the Russian Musical Society (RMS). Neither situation happened. Both men were negative, refusing to perform any of the symphony. He stopped work to fulfill his first public commission, a festival overture based on the Danish national anthem to celebrate the Moscow visit of the future Tsar Alexander III of Russia with his new Danish bride. Once the commission was finished, Tchaikovsky completed the symphony before the conservatory's Christmas break. This included modifications requested by Rubinstein and Zaremba as a condition for reconsidering the work.

Tchaikovsky resubmitted the manuscript to Rubinstein and Zaremba during the Christmas break. Even with their insisted changes, they still disapproved of the symphony on the whole; however, this time they passed the adagio and scherzo as "being fit for performance". These two movements were played at an RMS concert in St Petersburg on February 23, 1867, with no success. Tchaikovsky, who had looked upon St Petersburg as the premier musical location in Russia and been obsessed with having his symphony performed there first, was thoroughly disillusioned — not only with St Petersburg audiences, but also with the critical judgments of both his former teachers. He discarded all the revisions they had demanded, standing with one exception by his original version. The exception, it turned out, was unavoidable. At Zaremba's insistence, he had composed a new second subject for the opening movement. He had discarded the papers that contained his original second subject, and he could not remember what he had originally composed. Tchaikovsky had to let the second subject as approved by Zaremba stand as it was.

Back in Moscow, Anton's brother Nikolai was willing to perform the symphony; only the composer's insistence on a St Petersburg performance held him back. Tchaikovsky now allowed him to conduct the scherzo at a Moscow concert of the RMS on December 22. Though the scherzo met with little success, Rubinstein was still ready to perform the complete work. This finally took place on February 15, 1868, to great success. Surprisingly, though, the symphony would have to wait 15 years for its next performance. The first performance of the revised version took place in Moscow on December 1, 1883, under the baton of Max Erdmannsdörfer.

=== Struggles with form ===
Tchaikovsky freely confessed later in life that he could not write within the proper rules of Western sonata form—the rules of exposition and organic growth and development of themes pioneered by Germanic composers such as Haydn and Mozart. Anton Rubinstein was a slavish follower of those rules in his own works. That may in turn have been a handicap for Tchaikovsky in writing Winter Dreams. He could not write a symphony that would please Rubinstein by staying firmly within a classical format while writing music that would stay true to his strengths as a composer.

This does not mean that Tchaikovsky was completely unable to work within musical form. While his natural aptitude for organic symphonic procedures may have certainly been limited, he may have actually done himself less than full justice. This was Tchaikovsky's first large-scale work, and Rubinstein and Zaremba's interference did not help; they only added to anxieties Tchaikovsky would have naturally had in any case.

The First Symphony forced Tchaikovsky to face these facts in one very important way. Before beginning it, he had been content to mould his music as best he could to the practice of previous composers. Winter Dreams forced him to realize he would have to work "around the rules" for him to grow and develop as a composer. This meant adapting sonata form and symphonic structure to accommodate the music he was gifted to write. He showed tremendous resourcefulness in doing this, even as early as this symphony. As musicologist David Brown wrote, "The opening stretch of the first movement is enough to scotch the hoary old legend that Tchaikovsky was devoid of any real symphonic aptitude."

== Influences ==
=== Teachers ===
As opposed to the forward-looking tendencies of The Five, Anton Rubinstein and his followers remained suspicious, even hostile, to new trends in music. Instead, they attempted to preserve in their own works what they saw as the best in the Western tradition in the immediate past. Though not active as a composer, Nikolai Zaremba was no exception to this rule. He idolized Beethoven, particularly the late works, but his personal tastes had progressed no further than Mendelssohn. Rubinstein, a highly prolific composer in his own right, was almost as backward-looking as Zaremba, writing in a Germanic style similar to Schumann and Mendelssohn. Though as a teacher Rubinstein would try to foster his students' imaginations, he also expected them to remain as conservative as he was.

=== Mendelssohn and Schumann ===
Over the summer holiday with his family in 1866, when evening activities turned to music, Tchaikovsky invariably played Mendelssohn's Italian Symphony, Schumann's First or Third Symphonies, or Das Paradies und die Peri. Mendelssohn's presence is strong in Winter Daydreams, with a grace, lightness and pace throughout. The scherzo especially could have stepped from A Midsummer Night's Dream. Both the symphony's subtitle and those of the first two movements—"Dreams of a Winter Journey" and "Land of Desolation, Land of Mists"—betray a possible fondness of Mendelssohn's ability to express in symphonic form a personal experience arising out of emotion at a romantic landscape, though Tchaikovsky did not carry through this idea to the end (the latter two movements lack subtitles).

=== Russia ===
Even with these influences, Russian writer Daniel Zhitomirsky explains, "the subject, the genre and intonation" of Tchaikovsky's writing are closely intwined with Russian life and folk music." Warrack notes that "the obsessive thirds of Russian folk-song permeate Tchaikovsky's tunes; and he must also at some time been haunted by the interval of the falling fourth, so strongly does it colour the invention in the early symphonies, always prominently placed in the melodies and acting as emotional coloration rather than implying a harmonic progression."

== Performance history ==
Notable performances of Tchaikovsky's first symphony.

- Moscow, Russian Empire: 22 December 1866, conducted by Nikolai Rubinstein (premiere)
- Saint Petersburg, Russian Empire: 23 February 1867, conducted by Anton Rubinstein
- Moscow, Russian Empire: 15 February 1868, conducted by Nikolai Rubinstein
- Moscow, Russian Empire: 28 March 1870, conducted by Eduard Merten at the Bolshoi Theatre
- Moscow, Russian Empire: 1 December 1883, conducted by Max Erdmannsdörfer
- Saint Petersburg, Russian Empire: 3 November 1886, conducted by Georgy Deutsch
- New York, United States: 7 February 1896, conducted by Anton Seidl
- Bournemouth, Great Britain: 8 October 1900, conducted by Daniel Eyers Godfrey at Bournemouth Winter Gardens
- London, Great Britain: 27 August 1902, conducted by Henry Wood at Queen's Hall

== Notable recordings ==
- Antal Dorati conducting the London Symphony Orchestra
- Claudio Abbado conducting the Chicago Symphony Orchestra
- Igor Markevitch conducting the London Symphony Orchestra
- Michael Tilson Thomas conducting the Boston Symphony Orchestra
- Herbert von Karajan conducting the Berliner Philharmoniker
- Eugene Ormandy conducting the Philadelphia Orchestra
- Mariss Jansons conducting the Oslo Philharmonic Orchestra
- Yevgeny Svetlanov conducting the USSR State Symphony Orchestra
- Yuri Temirkanov conducting the Royal Philharmonic Orchestra
- Bernard Haitink conducting the Royal Concertgebouw Orchestra
- Mstislav Rostropovich conducting the London Philharmonic Orchestra
- Lorin Maazel conducting the Vienna Philharmonic Orchestra
- Zubin Mehta conducting the Los Angeles Philharmonic Orchestra
- Riccardo Muti conducting the New Philharmonia Orchestra, London
- Sir Neville Marriner conducting the Academy of St Martin in the Fields
- Vladimir Jurowski conducting the London Philharmonic Orchestra
- Neeme Järvi conducting the Gothenburg Symphony Orchestra
- Mikhail Pletnev conducting the Russian National Orchestra

== Eventual legacy ==
In contrast to the outright suffering involved with its composition, both mentally and physically, the finished symphony received acclaim from both popular audiences and professionals alike after its release. This has continued over the course of many years, and it has remained significantly lauded in large part due to its aforementioned structural inventions, with this taking place in the context of Russian music during the middle to late 1800s. Writing for the British mass media publication The Guardian in 2014, music journalist Tom Service argued that "Tchaikovsky's first symphony remodelled the form into a truly Russian style". The composer did this, according to Service, in a way that beyond "staking out territory that his five other symphonies continued to explore" additionally serves as "one of the most irresistibly attractive first symphonies ever written". Service added that the composer's skills particularly shine through given how certain sections involve "Tchaikovsky proving a point" about the fact "that he knew all the tricks in the academic book" while Tchaikovsky still incorporated certain boldly distinct musical elements, with the symphony's final movement striking listeners such as himself given its "irresistibly over-the-top conclusion".

== See also ==
- List of symphonies in G minor
- Russian classical music
