= Bard SummerScape =

American annual arts festival

Bard SummerScape is an annual eight-week-long arts festival held during the months of June, July, and August at Bard College in Annandale-on-Hudson, New York. Since its inaugural season in 2003, the festival is held in tandem with the Bard Music Festival and features performances of opera, dance, theater, music, film, and cabaret. The festival attracts professional artists from around the world. Concerts and productions are held at a variety of venues on the college's campus, including the Richard B. Fisher Center for the Performing Arts.

Since 2006, the festival has involved a spiegeltent that also hosts performances.

== Operas ==
The following operas have been performed at SummerScape, with the language of the production in parentheses:

- 2003: Destiny (Czech)
- 2004: The Nose (Russian)
- 2005: Regina (English); The Tender Land (English)
- 2006: Genoveva (German)
- 2007: Eine florentinische Tragödie (German); Der Zwerg (German)
- 2008: Harnasie (Polish); King Roger (Polish)
- 2009: Les Huguenots (French)
- 2010: Der ferne Klang (German)
- 2011: Die Liebe der Danae (German)
- 2012: Le roi malgré lui (French)
- 2013: Oresteia (Russian)
- 2014: Euryanthe (German)
- 2015: The Wreckers (English)
- 2016: Iris (Italian)
- 2017: Dimitrij (Czech)
- 2018: Demon (Russian)
- 2019: Das Wunder der Heliane (German)
- 2020: None due to the COVID-19 pandemic
- 2021: Le Roi Arthus (French)
- 2022: Die schweigsame Frau (German)
- 2023: Henri VIII (French)
- 2024: Le prophète (French)
- 2025: Dalibor (Czech)
