= T. C. Fairbairn =

Thomas Charles Fairbairn (usually credited as T. C. Fairbairn) (26 March 1874 – 6 January 1978) was a British musician, dramatist, opera producer and impresario, particularly known for his spectacular large-scale productions of Samuel Coleridge-Taylor's Hiawatha in the 1920s and 1930s.

== Early career ==
Fairbairn's father was Scottish, and he was educated in New Holland, Hull and Maxton in Scotland. His mother, Emma Bastow, was a singer, organist and choirmaster. He began his career as an engineer and train driver. Around 1900, encouraged by the bass and opera manager Charles Manners, he became a professional musician (operatic tenor), touring with the Moody Manners Opera Company for some years. He soon moved over to the production side, first as a stage manager and soon as an opera producer. In 1909 Fairbairn was engaged to produce Wagner's The Ring Cycle in Edinburgh, the first English language performance in Scotland. He was also the producer of the first UK performance of Der Rosenkavalier with Thomas Beecham conducting, on 29 January 1913 at Covent Garden. He established the Fairbairn Opera Company which toured Britain for the troops during the war, with the Surrey Theatre in London as its home base. It was claimed to be the first subsidised opera company.

== Hiawatha and other pageants ==
Fairbairn first produced his dramatised, costumed version of Scenes from the Song of Hiawatha in 1924. Held at the Royal Albert Hall, and featuring the Royal Choral Society and Albert Coates as conductor, it raised funds for the Royal National Institute for the Blind. The eight performances were so successful that he rebooked the hall and choir for the following year. He repeated the show every year until 1939, apart from 1926, the year of the General Strike. The production also toured other venues in the greater London area, and at the Brighton Dome. All but the first show featured 1,000 performers, 200 of whom were dancers. Malcolm Sargent took over as conductor and became so associated with these performances that one chapter of one of his biographies is called "The Wigwam Years". Chief Os-Ke-Non-Ton of the Mohawk tribe appeared as a soloist. Kenneth Alwyn, in the notes for his 1991 recording of Hiawatha, said:

"Fairbairn used in the interwar years to bring the war-painted, befeathered tribes of choristers from Wapping, Tooting, Penge and Cheam up for the annual event at the Royal Albert Hall in London under Great Chief Sargent".

Fairbairn also produced dramatised pageant versions of Elijah (from 1934), Faust and Tannhäuser, as well as Passion Play pageants such as The King of Glory, given at the Albert Hall in February 1937. Robert Burns, a folk song opera, was produced by the Peoples Theatre, Dumbarton, in 1939.

From 1940 he began to dramatise extracts from the Bible in music, drama and pageant form, from the fall of Satan until the second coming of Christ. There were 14 separate segments, the last completed in 1972, and a condensed version for schools (The Bible Story, 1972). They remained unproduced. Fairbairn appeared as a castaway on the BBC Radio programme Desert Island Discs on 18 May 1974, the first centenarian to appear on the programme.

== Personal life and death ==
Fairbairn married Antonie Seiter (c1887–1953), an opera singer, in Glasgow in 1904. In 1909 she sang Jack in the British stage premiere of Ethel Smyth's The Wreckers, at Her Majesty's Theatre, London, under Thomas Beecham. There were two sons. In 1939 they were living in Hampstead, London. A later address was 41 Essex Park, West Finchley. He died in Hammersmith in 1978, aged 103.
