= Symphony No. 3 (Popov) =

Symphony by Gavriil Popov

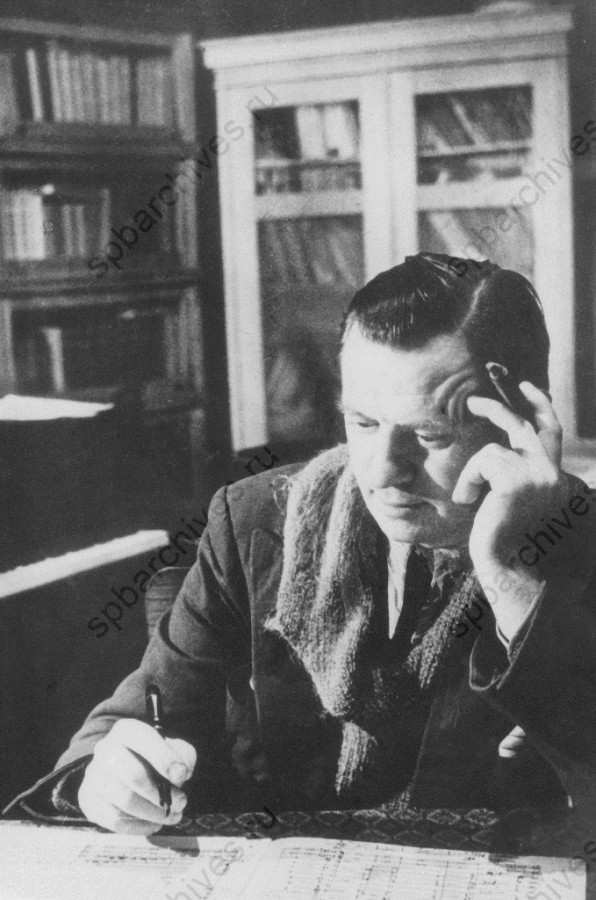
Gavriil Popov composing (1941)

Gavriil Popov composed his Symphony No. 3 for string orchestra, subtitled Heroic Symphony but also known as the Spanish, between 1939 and 1946. At ca. 55 minutes it is Popov's second longest symphony. It consists of five movements, four highly dynamic movements drawing on Spanish dances framing a twenty-minute-long memorial on the Spanish Civil War.

1. Intrada. Andante maestoso e molto espressivo
2. Allegro con fuoco, quasi presto
3. Prestissimo
4. Largo espressivo, molto cantabile e sempre con moto
5. Presto impetuoso

Following the ban of his Symphony No. 1 and the subsequent official condemnation of him being a formalist composer Popov focused on composing film music. In 1939 he arranged a suite from his soundtrack for Esfir Shub's documentary on the Spanish Civil War Spain and conceived in parallel a Concerto grosso for string orchestra (on the basis of the string episodes from Spain), as it can be read in the composer's diary on September 17. Work in the project was halted soon after completing the first movement, but Popov resumed it five years later, changing the work's title from "Concerto Grosso" to his third symphony. After two years of work, it was finished in September 1946.

The premiere took place in Moscow on January 31, 1947. Popov's Symphony No. 2, which had earned the composer a Stalin Prize the previous year, marked his provisional rehabilitation, and the third symphony met a favorable reception. In his diary Popov notes his former teacher Vladimir Shcherbachov "believes Symphony No. 3 is my best achievement". A meeting to discuss its nomination for the Stalin Prizes was arranged, but it was subsequently cancelled and the next year Popov was instead blacklisted in the resolution of the infamous First Congress of the Union of Soviet Composers.

The symphony was published in full score in 1978, given opus number 45. While most of Popov's symphonies were recorded between 1962 and 1989 Symphony No. 3 remained one of two unrecorded symphonies before it was recorded in December 2008 by the Saint Petersburg Symphony Orchestra.
