= OperaVision =

Free streaming service for opera performances

YouTube information
- Channel: OperaVision
- Genre: Opera
- Website: operavision.eu

OperaVision is a free streaming platform for performances of opera, operetta, musical theatre, dance, ballet and concerts, supported by the European Union's Creative Europe programme. It has been operating since 2014, and is managed by the organization Opera Europa. As of October 2024, this consortium has grown to 44 organizations from 17 countries. On World Opera Day 2025 (25 October), OperaVision announced their next initiative, the Opera Europa Next Generation platform. Since January 2025, this platform has supported many artists in dance and opera. It will continue to support about 560 artists over the next four years.
