= The Demon (opera) =

Opera by Anton Rubinstein

Demon
- Opera by Anton Rubinstein
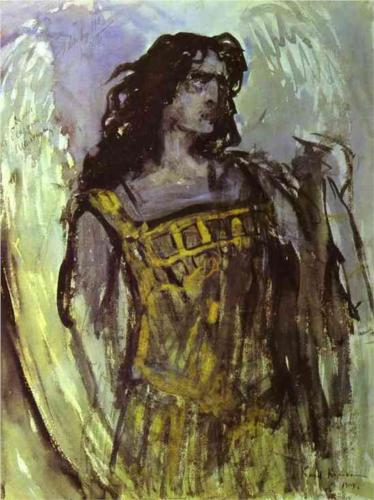
- Feodor Chaliapin in the title role, painting by Konstantin Korovin, 1903
- Native title: Russian: Демон
- Librettist: Pavel Viskovatov
- Language: Russian
- Based on: Demon by Mikhail Lermontov
- Premiere: 25 January 1875; Mariinsky Theatre, Saint Petersburg

Demon (Russian: Демон) is an opera in three acts (six scenes) by Russian composer Anton Rubinstein. The work was composed in 1871. The libretto was by Pavel Viskovatov, based on the poem of the same name by Mikhail Lermontov.

== Background ==
Lermontov's poem was banned as sacrilegious until 1860. Its popularity and its lurid story made it an excellent candidate for an opera libretto, and Rubinstein himself worked out the scenario from which Viskovatov produced the final text. The opera was premiered at the Mariinsky Theatre, St. Petersburg, on 25 January [O.S. 13 January] 1875, conducted by Eduard Nápravník. The stage design was by Mikhayil Bocharov, Matvey Shishkov, and Lagorio. The Moscow premiere was in 1879 at the Bolshoi Theatre, conducted by Enrico Bevignani.

The opera was published by V. Bessel and Co., St. Petersburg, in 1876. A further edition was in 1968 by Muzgiz, Moscow.

== Critical reception ==
Rubinstein invited several musicians of the group known as The Five, including César Cui, Modest Mussorgsky and Nikolai Rimsky-Korsakov, as well as the critic Vladimir Stasov to a private hearing of the opera in September 1871, where the guests did not regard the work favourably. However, melodic motifs from The Demon inspired comparable motifs in Mussorgsky's Khovanshchina and Tchaikovsky's Eugene Onegin.

Vladimir Nabokov called it a "dreadful" opera.

== Performance history ==
The opera received 100 performances in the first decade following its premiere. Its first performance in Paris was in May 1911, where the critics considered the opera to be old-fashioned.

Whilst it is still quite frequently performed in Russia, the opera has become a rarity in the West.

Demon was performed in a semi-staged version at the Tchaikovsky Concert Hall in Moscow in 2015 with Dmitry Hvorostovsky in the title role and Asmik Grigoryan as Tamara. The performance was directed by Dmitry Bertman of Helikon Opera and broadcast live on Russian television. The final scene of the opera also appears on his 2016 CD Dmitri Hvorostovsky Sings of Love, Peace, War and Sorrow. A fully staged production of the opera, also directed by Bertman, was performed in the original Russian at the Gran Teatre del Liceu in Barcelona in April–May 2018. The Liceu production was originally intended for Hvorostovsky, who died from a brain tumor in 2017. In his stead the role of the Demon was taken by the Latvian bass-baritone Egils Siliņš.

In 2018, Bard Summerscape created a new production directed by Thaddeus Strassberger.

== Roles ==
Role	Voice	St. Petersburg 1875	Moscow 1879	London 1881 (cond. Rubinstein)	Bard SummerScape 2018
Prince Gudal	bass	Osip Petrov	Anton Bartsal	Edouard de Reszke	Andrey Valentii
Tamara, his daughter	soprano	Wilhelmina Raab	Yelena Verni	Emma Albani	Olga Tolkmit
Tamara's Nurse	contralto				Ekaterina Egorova
Prince Sinodal, Tamara's betrothed	tenor	Fyodor; Komissarzhevsky		Sig. Marini	Alexander Nesterenko
Sinodal's servant	bass				Yakov Strizhak
Courier	tenor				Pavel Suliandziga
Demon	baritone	Ivan Melnikov	Bogomir Korsov	Jean Lassalle (baritone)	Efim Zavalny
Angel	contralto	Aleksandra Krutikova		Zelia Trebelli	Nadezhda Babintseva
Chorus: Evil and good spirits, Georgians, guests, Tatars, servants, nuns

== Synopsis ==
- Time: Unspecified
- Place: Georgia

=== Act 1 ===
==== Scene 1 Prologue ====
During a storm in the Caucasian mountains a chorus of evil spirits call upon the Demon to destroy the beauty of God's creation. The Demon sings of his hatred for the universe and rejects an Angel's plea for him to reconcile with heaven.

==== Scene 2 ====
Tamara, awaiting her wedding with Prince Sinodal, is by a river with her attendants. The Demon sees her and falls in love with her. He promises her that "all the world will kneel before her" if she returns his love. Tamara is fascinated but frightened by him and returns to the castle.

==== Scene 3 ====
Prince Sinodal's caravan is making its way to Prince Gudal's court for his marriage to Tamara but is delayed by a landslide. The Demon appears and vows that Prince Sinodal will never see Tamara again. The caravan is attacked by Tatars, and Prince Sinodal is mortally wounded. Before he dies he tells his servant to bring his body to Tamara.

=== Act 2 ===
==== Scene 4 ====
The festivities for the wedding have already begun. A messenger announces that Prince Sinodal's caravan has been delayed. Tamara senses the presence of the Demon and is fearful. When Prince Sinodal's body is brought into the castle, Tamara is overcome by grief, but to her horror, keeps hearing the supernatural voice of the Demon and his promises. She begs her father to let her enter a convent.

=== Act 3 ===
==== Scene 5 ====
The Demon intends to enter the convent where Tamara is now living, believing that his love for her has opened his spirit to goodness. An Angel tries in vain to stop him.

==== Scene 6 ====
Tamara prays in her convent cell but is constantly troubled by thoughts of the Demon, who appears to her in her dreams. The Demon now appears in reality, declares his love for her and begs her to love him in return. Tamara tries to resist her attraction to him but fails. The Demon kisses her in triumph. The Angel suddenly appears and shows her the ghost of Prince Sinodal. In horror, Tamara struggles out of the Demon's arms and falls dead.

==== Epilogue and Apotheosis ====
The Angel proclaims that Tamara has been redeemed by her suffering, while the Demon is damned to eternal solitude. The Demon curses his fate. In the final Apotheosis Tamara's soul is carried to Heaven accompanied by angels.
