= Symphony No. 4 (Popov) =

1949 symphony by Gavriil Popov

- Glory to the Fatherland
- by Gavriil Popov
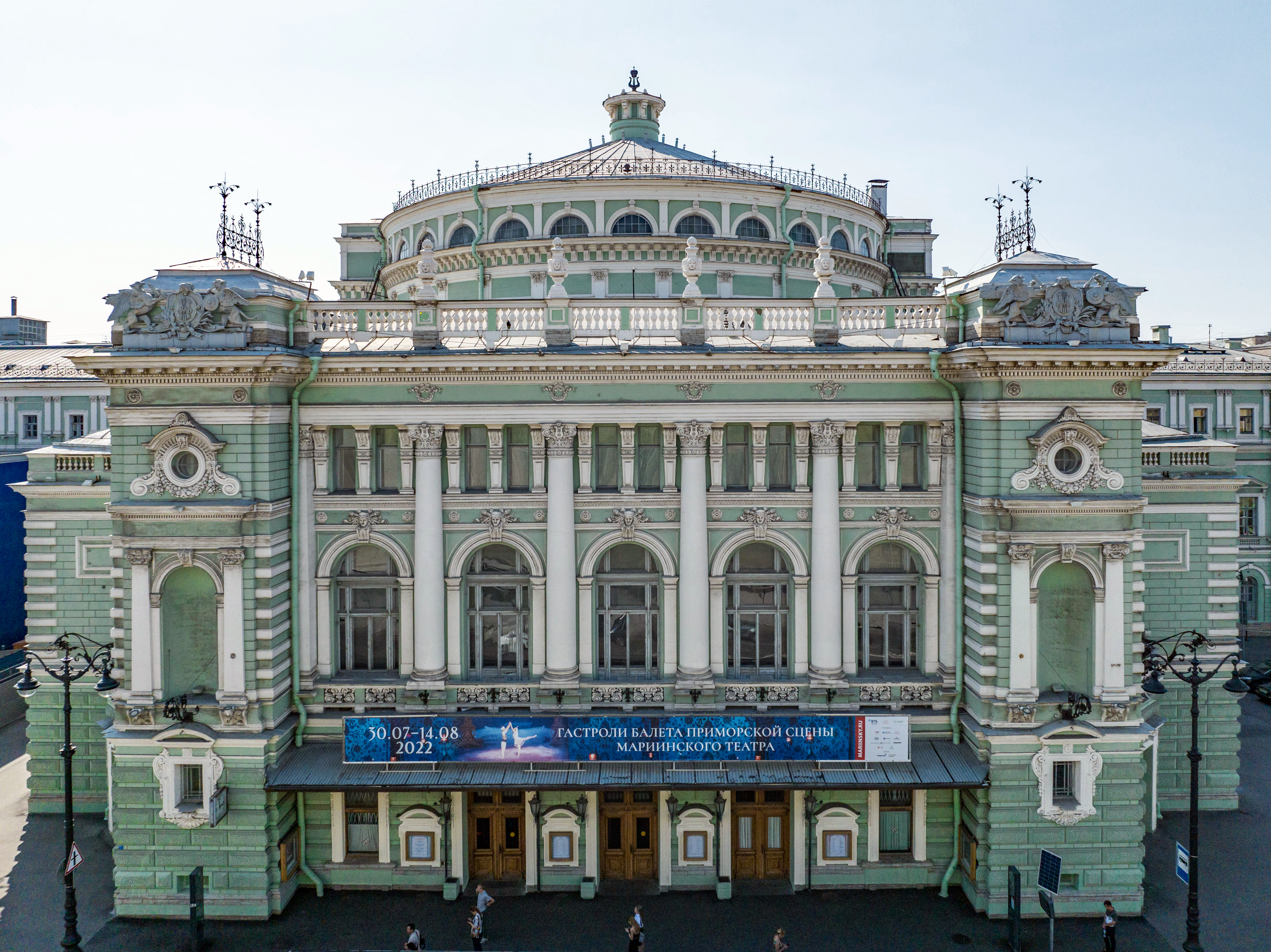
- The Mariinsky Theatre, site of the world premiere of Popov's Symphony No. 4, in 2023
- Opus: 47
- Text: Ilya Selvinsky
- Language: Russian
- Composed: May 1948–September 1949
- Duration: c. 60 minutes
- Movements: 4
- Scoring: Soprano; Mezzo-soprano; Tenor; Bass; SATB chorus

Premiere
- Date: February 6, 2023
- Location: Mariinsky Theatre; Saint Petersburg, Russia
- Conductor: Elmira Dadasheva
- Performers: Anna Denisova (soprano); Darya Ryabokon (mezzo-soprano); Dmitri Voropayev (tenor); Ilya Bannik (bass); Vocal Ensemble Arielle

The Symphony No. 4, Op. 47, subtitled Glory to the Fatherland (Russian: Слава Отчизне, romanized: Slava Otchizne), was completed by Gavriil Popov in 1949. He began to compose it in May 1948, according to the changed expectations of the Union of Soviet Composers in the wake of the campaign against formalism in music. Originally conceived as a concerto for a cappella chorus based on texts by Mikhail Golodniy, Popov revised and expanded the work into a choral symphony with texts by Ilya Selvinsky. He completed it on September 18, 1949.

After a private performance of one of its movements during a Muzfond session in 1949, the symphony was briefly considered for a Stalin Prize. The score was subsequently lost until it was rediscovered in the archives of the Moscow Conservatory decades later. Its world premiere did not occur until February 6, 2023, at the Mariinsky Theatre in Saint Petersburg, with vocal soloists and the Vocal Ensemble Arielle conducted by Elmira Dadasheva.

== Background ==
In February 1948, the Union of Soviet Composers launched its campaign against formalism in music, in the course of which Gavriil Popov became among six composers whose music was censured, with severe and immediate consequences for his career. During this period, Soviet authorities encouraged composers to shift their focus away from instrumental and orchestral works to vocal music, particularly cantatas and mass songs, based on texts that accorded with the tenets of socialist realism. According to Inna Romashchuk, who authored a monograph on Popov's music, the works from this period testify to Popov's willingness to follow the prevailing mood of the era, but without relinquishing personal control. Moreover, she describes his focus on vocal music as dovetailing with the logical course of his artistic development. He composed a number of choral works with patriotic and folkloric themes in the late 1940s and early 1950s, although these works were still criticized by his colleagues for their complexity.

It was against this background that Popov's Fourth Symphony emerged, his only non-orchestral symphony. According to his work catalog, he began to compose it in May 1948. He had originally conceived the work as a concerto for a cappella chorus entitled Glory to the Soviet Army! (Russian: Советской Армии—слава!, romanized: Sovietskoy Armii—slava!), based on texts by Mikhail Golodniy. The circumstances of the poet's death in January 1949, which resulted from being run over by a car, were considered suspicious. Despite completing the second movement by June 1949, Popov decided to reconfigure his symphony at this point. He re-subtitled it Glory to the Fatherland, expanded the music, and replaced Golodniy's texts with new ones by Ilya Selvinsky.

Popov completed the symphony on September 18, 1949. After being briefly considered for a Stalin Prize (second class) in 1949, the symphony was subsequently lost and only rediscovered decades later by professor Yuri Abdokov in the archives of the Moscow Conservatory. Struck by the symphony's originality, boldness, and what he described as its "poetic primordiality", he suggested it to Elmira Dadasheva, chorusmaster of Vocal Ensemble Arielle, which is known for programming new and unusual works. Her preparation for the symphony won the approval of Valery Gergiev to have the symphony premiered at the Mariinsky Theatre.

== Music ==
Popov's Symphony No. 4 consists of four movements:

1. To Soviet Power—Glory (Russian: Советской державе—слава, romanized: Sovietskoy derzhave—slava)
2. Spring (Russian: Весна, romanized: Vesna)
3. Grief and Fury of the People (Russian: Скорбь и гнев народа, romanized: Skorb' i gnev naroda)
4. Glory, Nation of Bogatyrs (Russian: Славься, народ-богатырь, romanized: Slav'sya, narod-bogatyr')

A typical performance of the symphony lasts approximately 60 minutes, with the outer movements taking about 20 minutes each to perform.

=== Instrumentation ===
The symphony is scored for:

Voices:
soprano
mezzo-soprano
tenor
bass
mixed chorus

== Premiere ==
A single movement from Popov's Fourth Symphony, "Spring", was performed on November 30, 1949, at the Small Hall of the Moscow Conservatory during a private meeting of Muzfond. The performers were the combined choirs of the Bolshoi Theatre and the Gnessin Institute conducted by Alexander Khazanov. Its perceived technical challenges discouraged further performances until the world premiere on February 6, 2023, at the Mariinsky Theatre in Saint Petersburg. It concluded a program that had also included performances of Rayok by Modest Mussorgsky and Antiformalist Rayok by Dmitri Shostakovich. Popov's symphony was performed by soloists Anna Denisova (soprano), Darya Ryabokon (mezzo-soprano), Dmitri Voropayev (tenor), Ilya Bannik (bass), and Vocal Ensemble Arielle conducted by Elmira Dadasheva.

== Reception ==
When the Fourth Symphony was performed privately for Muzfond in 1949, it attracted mild praise from Popov's colleagues, but its expressive intensity and relative modernity for the period took many by surprise. Its technical difficulty was especially noted.

In her review for Sankt-Peterburgskie Vedomosti of the symphony's world premiere in 2023, Vera Stepanovskaya wondered why Popov would turn to what she considered were "hollow Soviet texts" for his work:

But [these] take the back seat to the beauty of the music itself. Popov's avant-gardism manifests itself not in his melodies, but in his use of the human voice as instrument, replacing strings and winds. The choir itself is heard as a single musical instrument with its own color and texture.

She also noted the symphony's extreme demands on performers and added that despite its texts, the symphony was "built upon the principles of liturgical and folk music".

In remarks made to TASS before the premiere, Dadasheva said that Popov had composed a "one-of-a-kind work" that she compared to the finest Russian choral compositions by Sergei Rachmaninoff, Sergei Taneyev, and Alexander Gretchaninov.

Romashchuk said the Fourth Symphony was the conclusion of a trilogy of symphonies by Popov which "panoramically examined" Russia's historical past and present, as well as the role of the individual during wartime, and that it expressed the composer's desire for the joys of peace.
