= Chamber Symphony (Popov) =

Chamber music composition by Gavriil Popov

The Septet in C major, Op. 2, later retitled Chamber Symphony, is a chamber music composition by Gavriil Popov. Written in 1927, it established the young composer's reputation in the Soviet Union. The work is scored for flute, trumpet, clarinet, bassoon, violin, cello and double bass, and consists of four movements:

1. Moderato cantabile
2. Allegro
3. Largo
4. Allegro energico

The Chamber Symphony has usually been compared to his colleague Dmitri Shostakovich's Symphony No. 1, with Alex Ross pointing that the work has "more personality and invention than anything by Shostakovich from the same period" while lacking "Shostakovich's rock-solid sense of form, his Beethovenian aura of inevitability". Also relating the work to Igor Stravinsky's L'Histoire du soldat and Paul Hindemith's Kammermusik, he praised the Largo as "absolutely magical" and the fast passages with its "rhythmic surprises, unusual tonal combinations, nasty little dances that start and stop".

== Recordings ==
- Chamber Ensemble — Naum Seidel. Melodiya, 1968
- Moscow Chamber Ensemble — Alexander Korneyev. Olympia Records
- Bolshoi Theatre Chamber Ensemble — Alexander Lazarev. Melodiya, 1988
- Soloists from the St. Petersburg Symphony Orchestra — Alexander Titov, 2011
