= Oresteia (opera) =

Opera by Sergei Taneyev

Oresteia (Russian: Орестея) is an opera in three parts, eight tableaux, with music by Sergei Taneyev, composed during 1887–1894. The composer titled this work, his only opera, a "musical trilogy". The Russian libretto was adapted by A. A. Wenkstern from The Oresteia of Aeschylus. The opera was premiered on 29 October [O.S. 17 October] 1895 at the Mariinsky Theatre. Nikolai Rimsky-Korsakov wrote that soon after the premiere, the Mariinsky management made cuts to the opera, which angered Taneyev.

The best-known excerpt from Oresteia is the entr'acte played before the second tableau of Part III, "The Temple of Apollo at Delphi". This passage, as well as other themes from the opera, figured into one of Taneyev's other works, namely, his orchestral overture entitled Oresteia (1889). This overture—not included in the printed score of this opera—constitutes a separate 18-minute-long symphonic poem based on themes from the trilogy.

Passages in the overture echo the UK's and other nations' national anthem, "God Save the Queen", whose melody lies in antiquity.

Harlow Robinson has noted that the opera avoids dramatic treatment of the murders of Agamemnon, Cassandra, Clytemnestra and Aegisthus, depicting those events off-stage.

== Roles ==
Role	Voice type	Premiere cast (Conductor: - )
Agamemnon, king of Argos	bass	
Clytemnestra, his wife	alto	
Aegisthus, his first cousin	baritone	
Cassandra, a Trojan prisoner	soprano	
A Guard	bass	
Elektra, daughter of Agamemnon and Clytemnestra	soprano	
Orestes, son of Agamemnon and Clytemnestra	tenor	
Apollo Loxias	baritone	
Pallas Athena	soprano	
Areopagite	bass	
Libation-Bearer	bass	
Part 1: People, female servants of Clytemnestra, warriors, captives, bodyguards. Part 2: Female servants of Clytemnestra. Part 3: Furies, Athenian people, areopagites participating in the pan-Athenian procession

== Synopsis ==
Argos, before the Atrides palace.

=== Part 2: The Libation Bearers ===
Tableau 1: The interior of the Atrides palace

Tableau 2: An olive grove

Tableau 3: Setting as in Part 1

=== Part 3: The Eumenides ===
Tableau 1: A deserted place on the seashore

Tableau 2: Interior of Apollo's temple at Delphi

Tableau 3: Athens

== Selected recordings ==
- Deutsche Grammophon 2709 097 (original LP issue): Victor Chernobayev, Lydia Galushkina, Anatoly Bokov, Nelli Tkachenko, Tamara Shimko, Ivan Dubrovin, Arkady Savchenko, Ludmilla Ganestova, Stanislav Frolov, Mikhail Pushkariev; Chorus and Orchestra of the Belorussian State Opera and Ballet; Tatyana Kolomizheva, conductor

This performance was later released on two CDs on the Melodiya label, but is sadly long out of print. (Reference: Amazon/classical music/Taneyev:Oresteia)

This performance appears to be now back in print on the Melodiya label. Some confusion, however, as the earlier Melodiya release says it was recorded in 1978, while the current one claims 1965. But same orchestra and conductor, and the current release is available at Amazon.

== Performance History ==
- 1895 Mariinsky Theatre
- 2011 Samara
- 2013 Bard SummerScape - Directed by Thaddeus Strassberger and conducted by Leon Botstein.
- 2015 Rostov-on-Don

== Bibliography ==
- 100 опер: история создания, сюжет, музыка. [100 Operas: History of Creation, Subject, Music.] Ленинград: Издательство "Музыка," 1968, pp. 426–432.
- Anastasia Belina. ‘Representation of Clytemnestra and Cassandra in Taneyev's
- Oresteia.’Studies in Musical Theatre 2:1, 2008, pp. 61–81.
