= American Symphony Orchestra =

Symphony orchestra in New York City

- Orchestra
- The ASO at Carnegie Hall, 2018
- Short name: ASO
- Founded: 1962, by Leopold Stokowski
- Location: New York City, U.S.
- Concert hall: Richard B. Fisher Center for the Performing Arts
- Principal conductor: Leon Botstein
- Music director: Leon Botstein
- Website: americansymphony.org

The American Symphony Orchestra is a New York–based orchestra founded in 1962 by Leopold Stokowski whose mission is to demystify orchestral music and make it accessible and affordable for all audiences. Leon Botstein is the orchestra's music director and principal conductor. They perform regularly at Carnegie Hall and Symphony Space in New York City.

== History ==
Stokowski was 80 years old when he founded the orchestra. He served as music director together with assistant Amos Meller until May 1972 when, at the age of 90, he returned to England. Following Stokowski's departure, Kazuyoshi Akiyama was appointed music director from 1973 to 1978. Music directors during the early 1980s included, as principal conductors, Moshe Atzmon and Giuseppe Patanè. In 1985, John Mauceri assumed the post as music director. In 1991, Catherine Comet left her post at the end of her tenure with the orchestra and was succeeded by Bard College president Leon Botstein.

== Present day ==
Leon Botstein conducts the American Symphony Orchestra in Luigi Dallapiccola's Intolleranza at Carnegie Hall in 2018

Under the music director Leon Botstein, the ASO has pioneered the concept of presenting concerts curated around various themes drawn from the visual arts, literature, politics, and history, and unearthing rarely performed masterworks for well-deserved revival. These concerts are performed in the Vanguard Series at Carnegie Hall. The ASO seeks to preserve the rare works it performs from disappearing from the repertoire. While some rare works are available with complete parts and a score in usable condition, others require extensive restoration and even creation to render them performable. ASO's efforts to create these parts mean that these works are now available for performance by other orchestras.

The orchestra also performs in the concert series Classics Declassified at Peter Norton Symphony Space, and is the resident orchestra of the Richard B. Fisher Center for the Performing Arts. In 2010, the American Symphony became the resident orchestra of the Collegiate Chorale, performing regularly in the Chorale's New York concert series. The orchestra has made several tours of Asia and Europe and has performed in numerous benefits for organizations including the Jerusalem Foundation and PBS.

ASO's award-winning music education program, Music Notes, integrates symphonic music into core humanities classes in high schools across the tri-state area.

== Recordings ==
In addition to many albums released on the Telarc, New World, Bridge, Koch, and Vanguard labels, many live performances by the American Symphony are now available for digital download. In many cases, these are the only existing recordings of some of the rare works that have been rediscovered in ASO performances.
