= Justin Lavender =

Musical artist (born 1951)

- Born: 4 June 1951 (age 75)
- Occupation: Operatic tenor

Justin Lavender (born 4 June 1951) is an operatic tenor, a professor of vocal studies at the Royal College of Music and co-founder and Musical Director of Arcadian Opera.

He was educated at Bedford Modern School, Queen Mary College London and the Guildhall School of Music and Drama. Although he initially intended to train as a nuclear engineer he was persuaded by Sir Peter Pears and Benjamin Britten to pursue a career in music. Following his debut in 1980 as Nadir in Bizet's Les pêcheurs de perles at the Sydney Opera House, Lavender has performed with most of the world's major orchestras and opera companies. In addition to his operatic performances, Lavender is a professor of vocal studies at the Royal College of Music, an honorary professor of the Confucius Institute at Pfeiffer University, and from 2009 to 2020 was vocal consultant to the Choir of King's College Chapel, Cambridge.

In 2015 Lavender co-founded the community opera company, Arcadian Opera, which performs regularly at Stowe, Buckingham.

== Operatic performances ==
- 1980 – professional debut as Nadir in The Pearl Fishers (Sydney Opera House)
- 1990 – debut as Arnold in Rossini's Guillaume Tell (Royal Opera House)
- 1990 – debut as Tamino in Die Zauberflöte (Vienna State Opera)
- 1991 – debut and title role in Rossini's Le comte Ory (La Scala, Milan)
- 1993 – debut as Demodokos in Dallapiccola's Ulisse (Salzburg Festival)
- 2004 – title role in Gounod's Faust (Royal Opera House)

== Concert performances ==
- 1988 – Schubert's Mass in E Flat (Giulini and Berlin Philharmonic)
- 1988 – Bartók's Cantata Profana (Solti and London Philharmonic)
- 1991 – Schnittke's Faust Cantata (Abbado and Vienna Symphony)
- 1996 – Elgar's The Dream of Gerontius (Slatkin and Philharmonia)
- 2001 – Schnittke's Faust Cantata (Slatkin and BBC)

== Film ==
- 2002 – The Life of David Gale

== Recordings ==
- 1983 – video of Oedipus Rex
- 1989 – audio of La Noche Triste
- 1991 – audio of La Favorite
- 1993 – audio of Messiah
- 1993 – audio of I Puritani
- 1993 – video of Mitridate
- 1994 – audio of The Wreckers
- 1994 – audio of Rossini and Donizetti arias
- 1996 – audio of Britten Song Cycles
- 1996 – audio of Bomtempo Mattutina dei Morti
- 1997 – audio of Mozart Arias
- 1998 – audio of Alceste
- 1999 – audio of War and Peace
- 2004 – audio of Schnittke Faust Cantata
- 2006 – audio of Elgar's Dream of Gerontius
- 2008 – audio of Janáček Otčenas
