= Bard Music Festival =

Annual classical music festival in New York

The Bard Music Festival is an annual classical music festival held during the month of August on the campus of Bard College in Annandale-on-Hudson, New York.

== History ==
Founded in 1990, the festival was created with the intention of finding ways to present the history of music in innovative ways to contemporary audiences. To this end, each year the festival selects a single composer to be its main focus and presents performances in tandem with presentations on biographical details on the subject and links to the worlds of literature, painting, theater, philosophy, and politics that would have influenced the life and works of the featured composer. The effort to bridge the worlds of performance and scholarship often results in a variety of concert formats and styles that often depart from the typical recital and concert structure.

Concerts are frequently presented with informative preconcert talks, panel discussions by renowned musicians and scholars, and other special events.

In addition, each season a book of essays, translations, and correspondence relating to the festival’s central figure is published by Princeton University Press. The festival is currently led by Artistic Directors Leon Botstein, and Irene Zedlacher.

== Composers featured by year ==
- 1990: Johannes Brahms
- 1991: Felix Mendelssohn
- 1992: Richard Strauss
- 1993: Antonín Dvořák
- 1994: Robert Schumann
- 1995: Bela Bartok
- 1996: Charles Ives
- 1997: Joseph Haydn
- 1998: Peter IIlich Tchaikovsky
- 1999: Arnold Schoenberg
- 2000: Ludwig Van Beethoven
- 2001: Claude Debussy
- 2002: Gustav Mahler
- 2003: Leos Janáček
- 2004: Dmitrii Shostakovich
- 2005: Aaron Copland
- 2006: Franz Liszt
- 2007: Edward Elgar
- 2008: Sergey Prokofiev
- 2009: Richard Wagner
- 2010: Alban Berg
- 2011: Jean Sibelius
- 2012: Camille Saint-Saëns
- 2013: Igor Stravinsky
- 2014: Franz Schubert
- 2015: Carlos Chávez
- 2016: Giacomo Puccini
- 2017: Frederic Chopin
- 2018: Nikolai Rimsky-Korsakov
- 2019: Erich Wolfgang Korngold
- 2020: William Grant Still, Jessie Montgomery, Roque Cordero, Duke Ellington and others - held in September due to COVID-19
- 2021: Nadia Boulanger
- 2022: Sergei Rachmaninoff
- 2023: Vaughan Williams
- 2024: Hector Berlioz
- 2025: Bohuslav Martinů
