= Symphony No. 1 (Popov) =

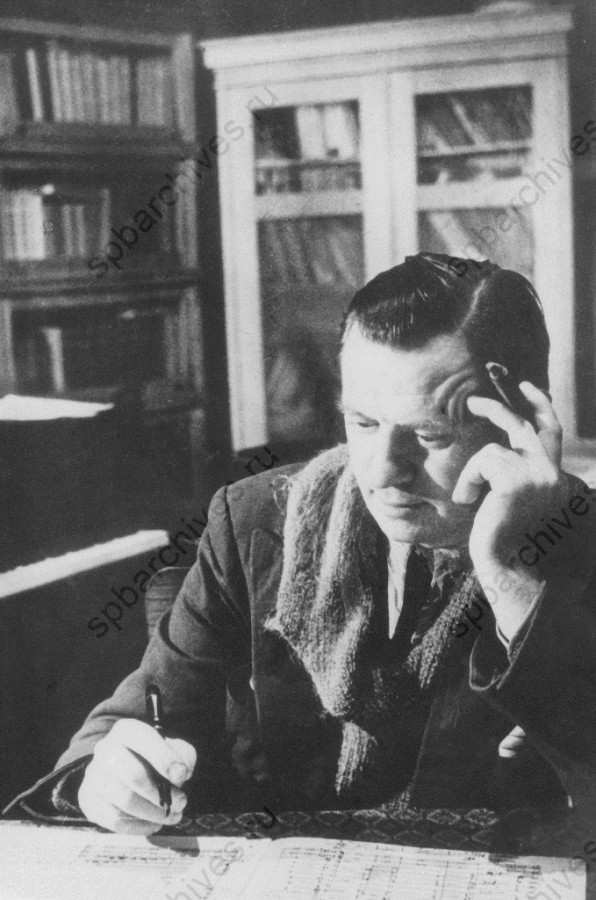
Gavriil Popov composing (1941)

Symphony No. 1 (Op. 7) by Soviet-Russian composer Gavriil Nikolayevich Popov is a composition that was banned from performance in the USSR. Popov had completed a sketch of the first movement by August 1929 and was preparing its last (third) movement by February 1930. The work, still in draft form, won a prize sponsored by the Bolshoi Theatre and the newspaper Komsomolskaya Pravda in September 1932. It received its premiere by the Leningrad Philharmonic Orchestra under conductor Fritz Stiedry on March 22, 1935.

One day after its premiere, Popov's symphony was banned by the Leningrad censorship board for reflecting 'the ideology of classes hostile to us.' Soviet authorities lifted the ban until Popov was denounced as a 'formalist' composer through his association with Dmitri Shostakovich in 1936. Popov's symphony was denied further performance in the USSR and then worldwide until after his death in 1972.

== Musical form ==
Popov's Symphony No. 1 is in three movements and roughly 50 minutes long, utilizing a large symphonic orchestra. The movements are:

1. Allegro energico (about 23 minutes)
2. Largo con moto e molto cantabile (about 16 minutes)
3. Finale: Scherzo e Coda. Prestissimo (about 9 minutes)

== Legacy ==
While obscure, Popov's Symphony No. 1 holds a unique place in Soviet musical history and influenced composers such as Dmitri Shostakovich and Alfred Schnittke. The symphony was written during a period of greater Soviet artistic freedom, inspired by avant-gardists such as Igor Stravinsky, Paul Hindemith, Béla Bartók, and composers from the Second Viennese School. Also of influence were the late-romantic symphonies of Gustav Mahler.

Popov's symphony is a highly dynamic work that uses expressionism and freeform styles of composition that were popular in Europe at the time. The symphony is known as a major inspiration for Shostakovich's Symphony No. 4, a similarly themed work in three movements. Shostakovich also withdrew his symphony from its Leningrad premiere during this stretch of artistic repression and, like Popov's, it was not heard in the concert hall until decades later.

After the 1936 debacle, Popov's composition style changed, fearing later condemnation by the Soviet government. While suffering from emotional conflicts and worsening alcoholism, he wrote five other symphonies that are widely viewed as conformist and devoid of his earlier originality. The Symphony No. 1 has experienced a modest revival by orchestras and recording labels such as Telarc, but remains more of a curiosity than a normal part of the repertoire.

== See also ==
- Gavril Popov
