= Gavriil Popov (composer) =

Soviet composer (1904–1972)

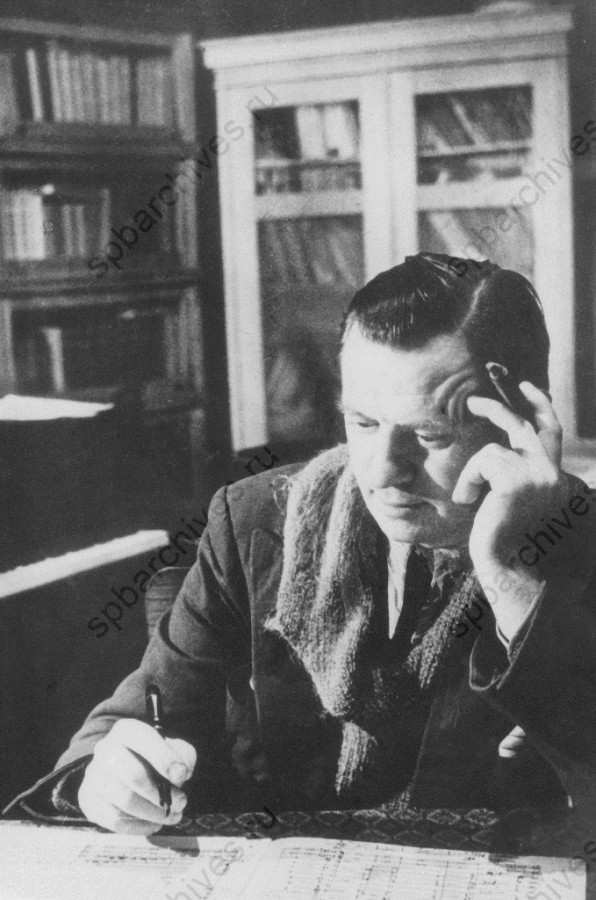
Gavriil Popov composing (1941)

Gavriil Nikolayevich Popov (Russian: Гаврии́л Никола́евич Попо́в; 12 September 1904 – 17 February 1972) was a Soviet composer.

== Life and career ==
Popov studied at the Leningrad Conservatory from 1922 until 1930 with Leonid Vladimirovich Nikolayev, Vladimir Shcherbachov, and Maximilian Steinberg. He was considered to have the raw talent of his slightly younger contemporary Dmitri Shostakovich.

His early works, in particular the Septet (or Chamber Symphony) (Op. 2, 1927) for flute, trumpet, clarinet, bassoon, violin, cello and bass, and his Symphony No. 1 (Op. 7) are impressively powerful and forward-looking. The symphony had its premiere by the Leningrad Philharmonic in 1935 and was immediately banned by a local censor; Popov was accused of formalism, a terrible stigma at the time. Together with Shostakovich, Popov successfully appealed the ban in Moscow, but nevertheless the symphony was not performed again until 1972. The influence of Popov's first symphony on Shostakovich's Symphony No. 4 is apparent.

Following his own censorship episode and the anonymous denouncing of Shostakovich in 1936, Popov began writing in a more conservative idiom in order to avoid further charges of formalism. Despite his alcoholism, Popov produced many works for orchestra, including six completed symphonies. Many of his compositions, written under the strictures of the Soviet system, are paeans to Soviet life and Communist heroes as prescribed by state authority. Examples include his Symphony No. 4, subtitled "Glory to the Fatherland," and a poem-cantata titled "Honor to our Party." In spite of this, the few works which have been recorded bear witness to an almost intact creative strength. Recent research claims that the progressive aesthetical approach of his early years has been transformed and secretly kept in a politically more accessible, yet maintaining a highly socio-critical music language. His melodic and instrumental invention was sharp, deeply rooted in Russian folk music. Even pieces adapted from propagandist movies, such as his Symphony No. 2, recorded by Hermann Abendroth (Urania LP), can be profoundly stirring. His sense of the orchestra, brilliant and buoyant, his grasp of large formal patterns, as found in the huge Symphony No. 3 for large string orchestra, are equally outstanding. Symphony No. 6 "Festive" betrays a kind of convulsive and disturbing vigor. Popov also wrote several film scores. He was awarded the Stalin Prize in 1946.

== Compositions ==
=== Orchestral ===
- Symphonic Suite No. 1 (1933)
- Symphony No. 1, Op. 7 (1935)
- Concert-Poem for Violin and Strings, Op. 17 (1937)
- Violin Concerto (started 1937 – unfinished)
- Symphonic Divertimento, Op. 23 (1938)
- Piano Concerto, Op. 24 (unfinished)
- Hispania Suite, Op. 28 (1940)
- Heroic Intermezzo, Op. 25 (1941)
- Symphony No. 2 "Motherland", Op. 39 (1943)
- Symphonic Aria for Cello and Orchestra, Op. 43 (1946)
- Symphony No. 3 "Heroic", a.k.a. "Spanish", Op. 45 (1946)
- Symphony No. 4, "Glory to the Fatherland", Op. 47
- Cello Concerto, Op. 71 (1953)
- Symphony No. 5 "Pastoral", Op. 77 (1956)
- Symphony No. 6 "Festival", Op. 99 (1969)
- Organ Concerto (1970)
- Overture for Orchestra (1970)
- Symphony No. 7 (started 1970 – unfinished)

=== Chamber music ===
- Chamber Symphony (Septet), Op. 2 (1927)
- Concertino for Violin and Piano, Op. 4 (1927)
- Song for Violin and Piano, Op. 6A (1927)
- Octet, Op. 9 (1927)
- Serenade for Brass, Op. 26
- Melody for Violin and Piano, Op. 35 (1946)
- String Quartet in C Major, Op . 61 ”Quartet-Symphony” (1951)
- Quintet for Flute, Clarinet, Trumpet, Cello and Double bass (1958)

=== Piano ===
- Two Pieces, Op. 1 (1925)
- Images
- Jazz Suite, Op. 5
- Grand Suite, Op. 6 (1928)
- Two Mazurka-Caprices, Op. 44 (1944)
- Two Children's Pieces, Op. 46 (1946)
- Two Pieces (1947)
- Two Fairytales, Op. 51 (1948)
- Three Lyric Poems, Op. 80 (1957)

=== Opera ===
- The Iron Horseman (1937)
- King Lear (1942)
- Alexander Nevsky (started 1941 – unfinished)

=== Choral ===
- The Red Cavalry Campaign
- To the Victory, cantata (1944)
- Our Homeland, suite for children's chorus Op. 50 (1948)
- Comic Cossack Song, Op. 52
- Symphony No. 4 "Glory to the Fatherland" for vocal quartet and mixed chorus, Op. 47 (1949)
- Everything that is Beautiful in Life, Op. 54
- O You Fields, for Voice and Female Chorus, Op. 56
- Heroic Poem for Lenin, cantata after Konashkov Op. 58 (1950)
- Peace to the People, after Filatov
- Tsimlyanskoye Sea, Op. 64 (1951)
- Three Choruses, Op. 66 (1952)
- Honour to the Party, after Mashistov
- The Communist, Someone Like You and Me, after Rustam
- The Birch and the Pine, Op. 92 (1960)
- Five Cossack Choruses, Op. 93 (1961)
- The Eagle's Family, Op. 94
- Spring Day, Op. 95
- Five Choruses after Pushkin, Op. 101 (1970)

=== Vocal ===
- Three Vocalises for Voice and Piano, Op. 3 (1927)
- Two Lyrical Settings from Pushkin, Op. 22 (1938)
- Two Romances after Levashov, Op. 48 (1948)
- Moskva, Op. 49 (1948)

=== Film scores ===
- The New Motherland (1932)
- Island of Doom (1933)
- A Severe Young Man (1934)
- Chapaev (1934)
- Call to Arms (1936)
- Bezhin Meadow (1937)
- The First Horse (1941)
- Once at Night (1941)
- She Defends the Motherland (1943)
- Front (1943)
- The Turning Point (1945)
- The Great Force (1951)
- Zvanyy Uzhin (1953)
- Partisan Children (1954)
- Unfinished Story (1956)
- Baltic Glory (1957)
- Poem of the Sea (1959)
- Chronicle of Flaming Years (1961)
- The Cossacks (1961)
- Dinner Time (1962)
- The Tale of Tsar Saltan (1966)
- The Enchanted Desna (1968)

== Recordings ==
- Symphony No. 1, Op. 7 (with Theme and Variations, Op. 3 by Dmitri Shostakovich) – London Symphony Orchestra/Leon Botstein (Telarc SACD 60642)
- Symphony No. 1, Op. 7; Symphony No. 2, Op. 39 "Motherland" – Moscow State Symphony Orchestra, USSR Radio and TV Symphony Orchestra/Gennady Provotarov (Olympia OCD 588)
- Chamber Symphony (Septet); Symphony No. 1, Op. 7 – St. Petersburg State Academic Symphony Orchestra/Alexander Titov (Northern Flowers NFPMA9996)
- Symphony No. 2, Op. 39 "Motherland" (with works by Farhad Amirov) – Leipzig Radio Symphony Orchestra/Hermann Abendroth (Urania, ULS 5156-CD)
- Symphony No. 2, Op. 39 "Motherland"; The Turning Point, Op. 44; Symphonic Poster from "Red Cavalry Campaign" – St. Petersburg State Academic Symphony Orchestra/Alexander Titov (Northern Flowers NFPMA9977)
- Symphony No. 3, Op. 45 "Heroic"; Symphonic Aria for Cello and Orchestra, Op. 43 – Dmitry Khrychov/St. Petersburg State Academic Symphony Orchestra/Alexander Titov (Northern Flowers NFPMA9972)
- Symphonic Suite No. 1 (from music to the film "Komsomol is the Chief of Electrification");
- Symphony No. 5, Op. 77 "Pastoral" – Moscow Radio and TV Symphony Orchestra/Edvard Chivzhel; USSR State Symphony Orchestra/Gurgen Karapetian (Olympia OCD 598)
- Symphony No. 6, Op. 99 "Festive"; Chamber Symphony for Seven Instruments, Op. 2 – USSR Radio Symphony Orchestra/Edvard Chivzhel; Moscow Chamber Ensemble/Alexander Korneyev (Olympia OCD 588)
