= October (Shostakovich) =

1967 tone poem by Dmitri Shostakovich

- by Dmitri Shostakovich
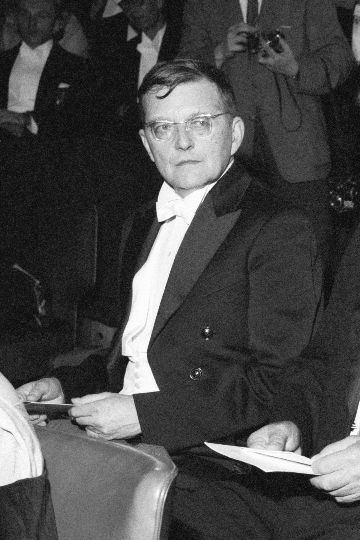
- Dmitri Shostakovich in 1958
- Key: C minor–C major
- Opus: 131
- Occasion: 50th anniversary of the October Revolution
- Composed: July 1967–August 10, 1967
- Published: 1967
- Publisher: Hans Sikorski Musikverlage
- Duration: 13 minutes
- Scoring: Orchestra

Premiere
- Date: September 16, 1967
- Location: Large Hall of the Moscow Conservatory
- Conductor: Maxim Shostakovich
- Performers: USSR State Symphony Orchestra

October, Op. 131, is a symphonic poem composed by Dmitri Shostakovich to commemorate the fiftieth anniversary of the October Revolution in 1967. He was spurred to compose the work after reencountering his score for the Vasilyev brothers' 1937 film Volochayev Days, reusing its "Partisan Song" in October. Although Shostakovich completed the work quickly, the process of writing it fatigued him physically because of his deteriorating motor functions.

The world premiere of October was played on September 16, 1967, by the USSR State Symphony Orchestra conducted by Maxim Shostakovich, the composer's son. He had been vying to conduct the world premiere of the Violin Concerto No. 2, but was offered October instead. The American premiere took place on October 10, 1988, at Avery Fisher Hall, played by the New York Philharmonic conducted by Andrew Davis.

In spite of its populist aims, October was received tepidly in the Soviet Union. Western critics have also been muted and sometimes hostile to the work, but some have defended it; finding in it parallels to the Tenth and Eleventh Symphonies, and stating that it is unjustly ignored.

== History ==
=== Composition ===
In a Pravda article published before the premiere of October, Shostakovich said:

I had long been intending to write a musical work for the fiftieth anniversary of the Revolution, but nothing had worked out. Then a few months ago I was at the Mosfilm Studios, where the Vasilyev brothers' old film Volochayev Days, for which I wrote the music, was being prepared for re-release. On hearing it again, I felt that my "Partisan Song" had turned out not badly in those days. The picture reminded me of it, and quite unexpectedly I "heard" the whole of my future symphonic poem, and set about writing it. I composed the main theme afresh—it is marked by the intonations of revolutionary songs—and for the secondary theme I used my old "Partisan Song." I elaborated both themes considerably, and the result was a symphonic work of about 12 or 13 minutes' duration.

According to Vadim Bibergan, Shostakovich complained that the physical effort of writing October was "very hard work." He completed the score on August 10 while vacationing with his family at Belovezhskaya State Reserve. The following day, Shostakovich announced the news in a letter to his friend Isaak Glikman, writing to him that he had "been working without a break for the past seven days" and felt exhausted as a result.

Marina Sabinina speculated that October may have emerged from Shostakovich's unrealized attempt to depict the Russian Civil War in the third movement of his Twelfth Symphony, citing its use of the "Partisan Song" and a comment by the composer saying that he had "been nurturing his new poem for a long time."

In response to a questionnaire submitted to him by Komsomolets Tajikistana, Shostakovich wrote:

I particularly enjoyed working on my symphonic poem October, which expresses my feelings of pride in my Motherland and admiration for her exploits.

=== Premieres ===
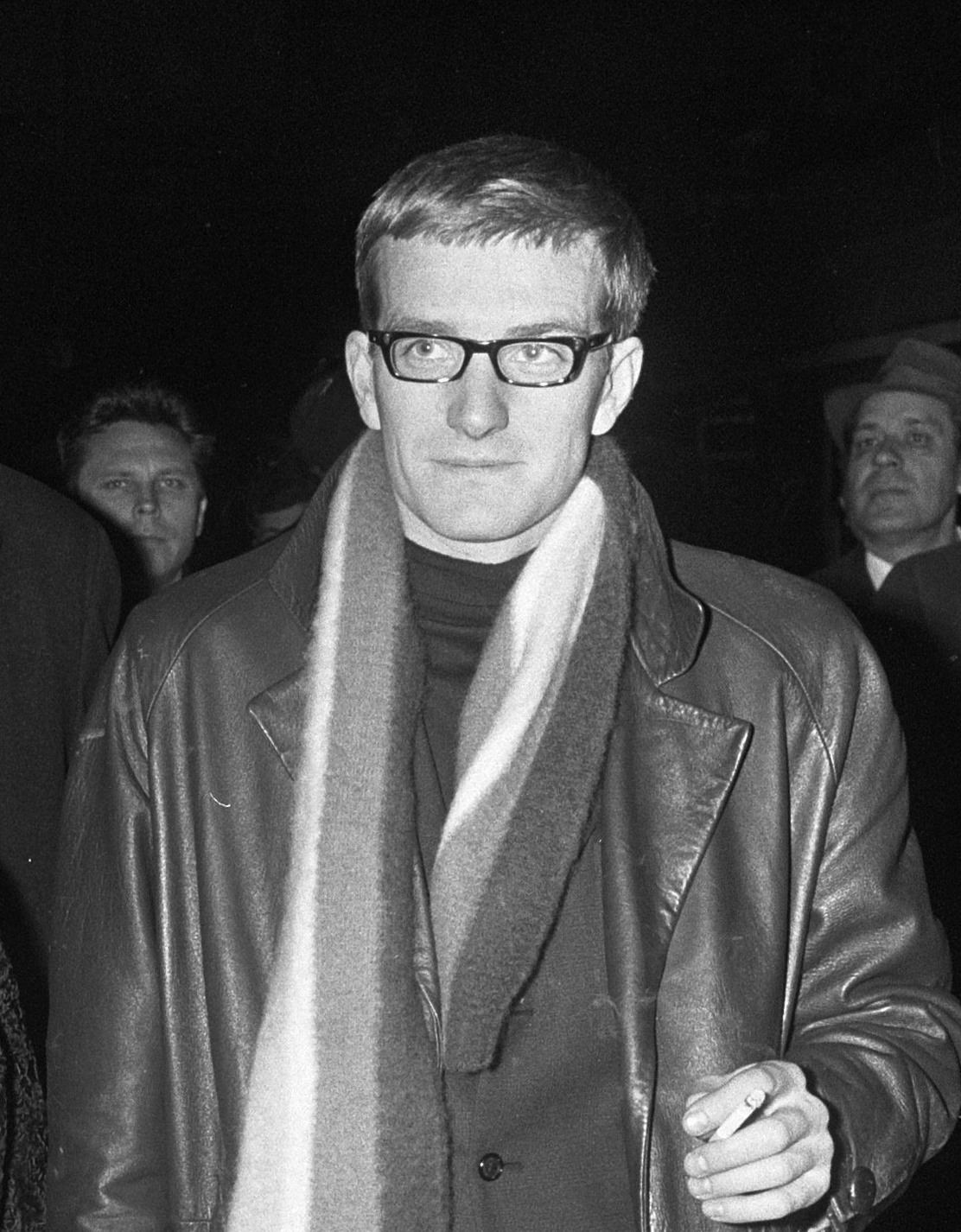
Maxim Shostakovich in 1967

At the same time that Shostakovich was working on October, he was also rehearsing his newly composed Violin Concerto No. 2 with its dedicatee David Oistrakh. In the course of their discussions on the concerto's interpretation, Shostakovich informed Oistrakh that his son Maxim had expressed intense interest in conducting its world premiere. Shostakovich left it to Oistrakh to choose the conductor, but urged the violinist to speak with Maxim personally and explain to him the seriousness of the duties involved in conducting a world premiere. In a subsequent letter, the composer explicitly stated his preference for Kyril Kondrashin, but delegated to Oistrakh the responsibility of informing Maxim of the decision. Instead of the concerto, Shostakovich entrusted to Maxim the world premiere of October.

The world premiere of October took place on September 16, 1967, at the Large Hall of the Moscow Conservatory, performed by the USSR State Symphony Orchestra conducted by Maxim Shostakovich; the composer was hospitalized at the time and was unable to attend the concert. Further performances in Moscow and Leningrad soon followed during the plenum of the board of the RSFSR Union of Composers, the Music of Soviet Russia festival, and Week of Soviet Music; altogether these events lasted from September 21–October 24. In addition to the original performers, the Moscow Philharmonic Orchestra conducted by Kondrashin also performed October during these weeks.

Andrew Davis conducted the American premiere of October with the New York Philharmonic at Avery Fisher Hall on October 10, 1988.

== Instrumentation ==
The instrumentation for October is as follows:

Woodwinds

piccolo
2 flutes
2 oboes
English horn
3 clarinets (B♭ and A)
2 bassoons
contrabassoon

Brass

4 horns
2 trumpets (B♭)
3 trombones
tuba

Percussion

timpani
snare drum
cymbals

Strings

1st violins
2nd violins
violas
cellos
double basses

== Music ==
October is a single-movement work. It begins in C minor with a "Moderato" rising minor third figure in triple metre that has elicited commentary for its resemblance to the opening of Shostakovich's Tenth Symphony. Out of this, four variants of the theme emerge and spur on the work's development in the succeeding main "Allegro" section. Clarinets soon play a contrasting second theme in quadruple metre which quotes Shostakovich's "Partisan Song." The rest of the work alternates between these themes with increasing rapidity. It concludes in C major with the opening riff of the "Partisan Song" repeated in octaves first by the strings and winds, then closing with brass.

A typical performance of October lasts approximately 13 minutes. It is Shostakovich's only symphonic poem.

== Reception ==
Critical reaction to Shostakovich's October in the Soviet Union was muted. Despite its populist intent, it did not manage to transcend the occasion it was composed for. According to Krzysztof Meyer, even critics sympathetic to the work's overt patriotism, such as Israel Nestyev, expressed their disappointment. According to Sofia Khentova, some critics in the Soviet press detected Cossack influences in the work and speculated whether these were drawn from material intended for Shostakovich's unrealized opera based on Mikhail Sholokhov's And Quiet Flows the Don.

Appraisals of October were more severe in the West. In his review of the work's American premiere, Tim Page wrote:

"[T]his is a vulgar, blaring, simple-minded exercise in socialist realism [...] it is impossible to hear October as anything more than skillful, cynical hack work, with banal melodies, blatant orchestration, and deliberately simplistic harmonies."

Meyer dismissed October as an inferior variant of fragments from Shostakovich's Twelfth Symphony, that "it is impossible to find even a single original idea" in the score, suffers from "very serious formal defects, especially in its second half," and that "even the Song of the Forests would qualify as a masterpiece in comparison." Elizabeth Wilson shared similarly negative opinions of October, which she called "one of Shostakovich's most abject failures." Dmitri Smirnov listed October among what he regarded as Shostakovich's "official and openly conformist, propaganda-type compositions."

October also has its defenders. William Zakariasen, writing in the New York Daily News, said that while October was "noisy, banal, fundamentally insincere," it also took "such a great composer to write such enjoyable trash." Shostakovich's versatility in being able to "easily revert back to something more 'middle-period' when required" drew praise from Michael Mishra, who also wrote that October was a "stirring work." In her survey of Shostakovich's music composed for official occasions, Pauline Fairclough praised October as a "fine symphonic poem" that feels "strikingly active." David Fanning referred to October as a "score of real substance" that was "too profound" for the occasion that it was composed for. Philip Taylor wrote that the work, with its allusions to "The Ninth of January" movement from the Eleventh Symphony, was a "vibrant and colorful piece with a very satisfying structure in which the climaxes are carefully placed to achieve the maximum dramatic effect," and that its relative neglect was unjustified.

== Sources ==
- Fay, Laurel (2000). Shostakovich: A Life. Oxford: Oxford University Press. ISBN 0-19-513438-9.
- Khentova, Sofia (1985). Шостакович. Жизнь и творчество (in Russian). Vol. 2. Moscow: Советский композитор.
- Meyer, Krzysztof (2011). Shostakovich: Su vida, su obra, su época (in Spanish). Madrid: Alianza Editorial. ISBN 978-84-2065268-9.
- Shostakovich, Dmitri (1981). Dmitry Shostakovich: About Himself and his Times. Moscow: Progress Publishers.

== See also ==
- Symphony No. 2 "To October"
- Symphony No. 12 "The Year 1917"
- Loyalty
