= King Lear (Shostakovich film score) =

1970 film score by Dmitri Shostakovich

- Film score by Dmitri Shostakovich
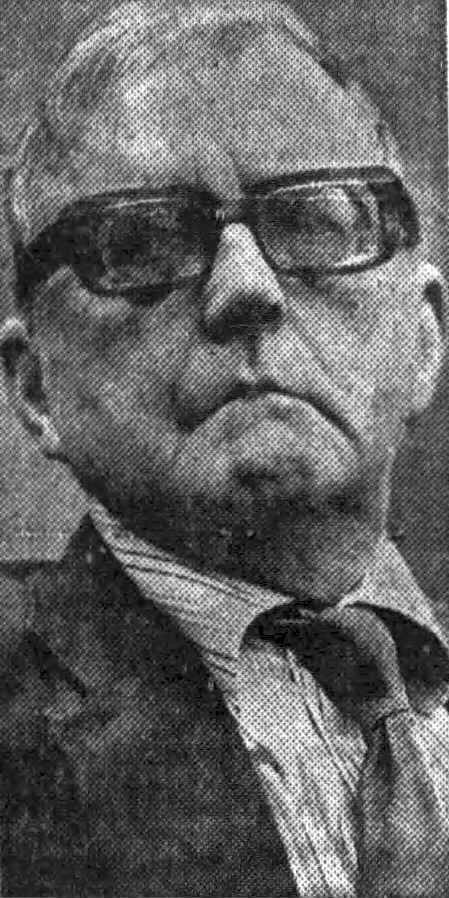
- Shostakovich in June 1973
- Native name: Король Лир
- Opus: 137
- Text: William Shakespeare (translated into Russian by Boris Pasternak and Samuil Marshak; adapted by Boris Slutsky and Grigori Kozintsev)
- Language: Russian
- Composed: June 1969 – July 27, 1970: Kurgan, Leningrad, Moscow, and Repino, Russian SFSR
- Published: 1976 (two excerpts); 1987 (selection of twenty cues); 2017 (with Poor Tom's songs)
- Publisher: G. Schirmer; Muzyka; Hans Sikorski Musikverlage; DSCH Publishers
- Duration: c. 30 minutes
- Scoring: Male voice a capella; SATB chorus a capella; Orchestra

Premiere
- Date: February 4, 1971 (film premiere)
- Conductor: Dzhemal-Eddin Dalgat, Nikolai Rabinovich
- Performers: Leningrad Philharmonic Orchestra

King Lear (Russian: Король Лир, romanized: Korol Lir), Op. 137, is a film score composed by Dmitri Shostakovich for the 1971 film King Lear by Grigori Kozintsev, based on Shakespeare's tragedy. It is Shostakovich's last completed film score.

Kozintsev and Shostakovich had collaborated on films since The New Babylon in 1929. The director had begun pre-production for King Lear in late 1965 and wanted to work with Shostakovich again, who had scored his previous film, Hamlet. Issues stemming from that film's use of music and Shostakovich's own declining health, which included a 40-day hospitalization for medical treatment at the clinic of Gavriil Ilizarov in Kurgan, delayed progress on his score for King Lear until 1970. Further delays resulting from chronic health problems, as well as concurrent work on Loyalty and his Thirteenth String Quartet, led to the composer twice suggesting to the director that he be replaced. By May 1970, Kozintsev informed Shostakovich that it was too late to find a replacement, at which time the composer began concentrated work on the score.

Of the seventy cues composed for King Lear, fewer than half were utilized in the final cut. The last cue Shostakovich composed was for a cappella chorus; the score was completed on July 27, 1970. The soundtrack was recorded by the Leningrad Philharmonic Orchestra conducted by Dzhemal-Eddin Dalgat and Nikolai Rabinovich.

King Lear premiered on February 4, 1972; it was screened in the West later that year. Audiences and critics praised Shostakovich's music, which Kozintsev described to Ronald Hayman as the "real voice of Shakespeare".

== Background ==
=== Origins ===
Grigori Kozintsev and Dmitri Shostakovich were longstanding collaborators on numerous films, beginning with The New Babylon in 1929. They had also previously worked together on a staging of William Shakespeare's King Lear performed in Leningrad at the Gorky Bolshoi Drama Theatre in 1941.

Pre-production for what eventually became his cinematic adaptation of King Lear began in late 1965, when he re-engaged Simon Virsaladze as set designer. The two had previously worked together on Hamlet. Virsaladze's belief that a film version of King Lear should be austere in tone and gesture became defining traits of Kozintsev's burgeoning project. A subsequent trip to Japan reaffirmed this stylistic direction for the director. During this time, he reacquainted himself with Kabuki, which he had first experienced with Sergei Eisenstein when the company of the Kabuki-za toured the Soviet Union in 1928. Kozintsev also attended a performance of a Noh play, which he described as a "philosophical poem with lyrical digressions". He was reminded of a sub-plot from King Lear as he watched the performance. By the end, he recorded in his diary that he "finally understood the art of classical drama".

In the course of travels in Japan, Kozintsev met with Akira Kurosawa, Toshiro Mifune, and Hiroshi Teshigahara. They conversed at length and exchanged ideas on art. The Soviet director also visited the Hiroshima Peace Memorial. All these experiences left their imprint upon his King Lear.

=== Shostakovich signs on ===
Casting and location scouting for King Lear began in 1968. Kozintsev's previous film, Hamlet, had been scored by Shostakovich; the director anticipated using his music again for King Lear. One of his diary entries noted that Russian translations of Shakespeare's play could not match the tragic force of the original English, but that in Shostakovich's symphonies he had found qualities that were "similar and of equal weight".

Kozintsev did not formally request to work again with Shostakovich until a letter dated May 22, 1968. He brought up the sound mix, which in Hamlet had been a source of complaint for the composer, who felt it had left his music at a disadvantage. One scene with galloping horses provoked his especial disapproval:

If it is a question of choosing between music and the text, I agree that Shakespeare's words should drown the music. But I am not prepared to agree to hooves drowning the music.

In reference to this, Kozintsev assured Shostakovich that King Lear would have "no hooves at all". Experience with Hamlet led the director to use music more sparingly in King Lear. Whereas in the former he had sought music that would be "the flesh of cinematic imagery", for the latter he said that he only wanted music for scenes where it was necessary and did not have to compete with extraneous sounds. This dovetailed with Shostakovich's own preferences, who in 1948 wrote in response to his dissatisfaction with the sound mix in Michurin that "music should only be played where it is really needed".

Shostakovich replied on May 24 that he looked forward to the assignment, but was concerned that his deteriorating physical abilities could impede work. He had been progressively losing use of his limbs since 1958, a condition which would be diagnosed in late 1969 as a rare type of polio; his son, Maxim, later said it was motor neurone disease. Privately, the composer had considered rejecting the offer, but ultimately accepted because of his love for Shakespeare and loyalty to Kozintsev. The director was aware of the composer's limitations and was deferential to them. He said that his new film would require much less music than Hamlet. In the event that an original score could not be composed, the director suggested reusing the music from their 1941 King Lear collaboration.

After accepting Kozintsev's offer, Shostakovich wrote to Marietta Shaginyan on December 3, 1968, that he hoped his forthcoming film score would be the initial step towards a self-contained musical work based on King Lear, a long-held ambition which remained unrealized.

=== Composition ===
Shostakovich received the completed script for King Lear in December 1968, along with a long letter from Kozintsev that explained what kind of music he wanted, particularly for the Fool. The director asked him to compose not background music for scenes, but motifs for characters and particular situations, as well as for more abstract themes. "It's hard for me to say how best to compose, not some long music piece, but these separate elements that make up the very fabric of the action", he wrote.

Filming for King Lear began on January 19, 1969. Three days before, on January 16, Shostakovich gave permission to Kozintsev to reuse his songs for the Fool from their 1941 King Lear collaboration. On June 29, the composer submitted his first piece of original music for the film, in response to a request from the director for "a few very simple melodies" to be sung a capella by Edgar in disguise as Poor Tom. Leonhard Merzin, who played Edgar, sang the songs for Kozintsev, who was pleased, but could not find an appropriate place for them within the film. He suggested to Shostakovich the possibility of using them non-diegetically at the beginning of the film in a "barely audible sad voice". The songs were recorded for the soundtrack in July, before the shooting of the opening scene itself, and without the supervision of the composer. Only one song, "Still through the hawthorn blows the cold wind", was used in the film. Isaak Glikman later pointed out the song's similarity to "Le Suicidé" from Shostakovich's Fourteenth Symphony, which the composer acknowledged.

Subsequently, Kozintsev asked Shostakovich for a "call sign" depicting the Fool's bells; a musical cue which would indicate to the viewer that "the broadcast is about to begin and that he must tune in on the exact wave". Shostakovich responded with a brief piece for percussion. Upon hearing it, Kozintsev felt that it did not fit in with the film, although he said it was an excellent piece of music. "The result was not a sign for recognition", he wrote, "but a musical characterization". Displeasure over cut music notwithstanding, Shostakovich agreed to all of Kozintsev's decisions out of professionalism and conviction in the requisite synthesis of the arts needed to create a unified cinematic statement.

Shostakovich initially struggled with composing music for King Lear. He shifted his energies for a time into his Thirteenth String Quartet, which he had begun in August. From November until December 24, he was hospitalized and unable to compose. On December 18, Kozintsev, who had just returned to Leningrad from filming in the Estonian SSR, informed the composer that shooting was mostly complete and projected to end in May 1970. His letter explained in detail the kind of music he expected for King Lear. The director said there would be little action directly represented by music. He did not want "stylization of antiquity" as in Hamlet, but "the language of contemporary art which you use to express the contemporary world". He also requested a salon music–style piece to accompany a scene with Goneril and a cue for chorus a capella that would express "grief, human suffering which has no limits" and a "lament of the earth itself". Shostakovich replied on December 24 that he had just been released from the hospital after a 40-day stay, was ready to work with the director on a final musical outline for the film, and that he would complete the score in 1970 at his dacha in Repino.

The two met at the Lenfilm studios in Leningrad on January 15, 1970, where Shostakovich viewed preliminary footage of the film and praised the results. After arriving at his dacha in Repino, he initiated work on the score, but further progress was delayed again. The composer went to receive treatment for his weakened limbs at the clinic of Gavriil Ilizarov in Kurgan. From there, Shostakovich reported on February 27 that he would not be able to continue work until April and suggested that he be replaced. Kozintsev replied by assuring him that the schedule and production would accommodate his needs. To this, Shostakovich reiterated that poor health was detaining his ability to complete the score. "Again I suggest you think about replacing me", he told the director. Krzysztof Meyer recalled that the composer told him during this period that he was physically unable to complete the music. On May 1, Kozintsev informed Shostakovich that he could no longer postpone production. He suggested omitting all cues requiring a symphony orchestra and reducing the use of music to the minimum extent the film could permit. However, he said that finding a replacement composer was no longer possible.

It was in early May that Shostakovich began intensive work on the King Lear score, parts of which he composed concurrently with Loyalty and the Thirteenth String Quartet during his medical treatment in Kurgan. On May 13, he sent along a number of cues to Kozintsev, but warned the director that he would not be able to leave Ilizarov's clinic in order to attend recording sessions for the soundtrack on May 22. The composer was released from the clinic on June 11; on June 18, he arrived in Repino, where he continued work on the film score. That same day, he visited Lenfilm to see more footage and attend the soundtrack's recording sessions with the Leningrad Philharmonic Orchestra conducted by Dzhemal-Eddin Dalgat. From this point until the completion of the score, Shostakovich and Kozintsev worked closely together, meeting regularly in person and over the telephone. The composer submitted music for symphony orchestra, including for the storm scene, which he was eager to score, in spite of the director's suggestion not to. The final cue Shostakovich composed for the film was the choral "Lamentation", which profoundly impressed Kozintsev:

Shostakovich expressed pity like a force. There is such an abundance of feeling contained in the grief of his "lament" that it gives rise to faith: the evil times will pass, they cannot do otherwise if such a voice is heard.

All work on the score was completed on July 27, 1970. In an interview with Izvestia, Shostakovich remarked that the process of composing the score for King Lear had been a "long and laborious effort". It was the final completed collaboration between Kozintsev and Shostakovich.

== Music ==
=== Cues ===
Altogether, Shostakovich composed seventy musical cues for King Lear, of which less than half were utilized in the film. The first of those to be published was the salon-style piece for the dinner scene with Goneril and the a capella choral "Lamentation"; both of these were published in 1976 by G. Schirmer, the latter under the title "Weeping Song". In 1987, Muzyka selected twenty cues for publication in Volume 42 of their collected works edition of Shostakovich's music. The 2017 new collected works edition by DSCH Publishers supplemented these with the previously unpublished songs for Poor Tom, including those which were not recorded for the film soundtrack.

Total duration for all the published cues is approximately 30 minutes.

The published cues are:

Number	Title	Tempo	Notes
1	Horn of the Beggars' Leader		
2	Horn of the Beggars' Leader		
3	Departure of the King's Retinue	Allegro	
4	Edmund Gives the Command to Attack	Allegro	
5	Edmund Gives the Order for the Duel	Allegro	
6	Edgar's Trumpeter Calls Back		
7	The Fool's Bells	Allegretto	Unused in the film
8	The Fool's Shawm	Moderato	
9	Hunting Horn	Allegro	
10	Death's Call	Adagio	
50	Introduction (March of Time)	Adagio	
51	First Sighting of Lear's Castle	Adagio	
52	[Untitled]	Moderato	
53	Beginning of the Catastrophe	Adagio	
54	The Voice of Truth	Adagio	
55	The Storm	Moderato	
56	Lamentation	Adagio	Final cue composed for the film
57	The Storm (Beginning)	Adagio	
58	Dinner at Goneril's	Allegretto	In the key of G major, it is the only cue in the film with a key signature.
70	Ending of the Film. Finale	Moderato	
	Poor Tom's Songs		Of the five composed, only No. 1 was recorded for the soundtrack. Their respective tempo markings are: . = 58, = 80, = 100, = 66, and . = 66.

=== Instrumentation ===
King Lear is scored for:

Woodwinds
3 Flutes (3rd doubling piccolo)
2 Oboes
3 Clarinets (3rd doubling E-flat clarinet)
2 Bassoons

Brass
4 French horns
3 Trumpets
3 Trombones
Tuba

Percussion
Timpani
Tambourine
Snare drum
Cymbals
Tam-Tam
Tubular bells
Glockenspiel
Xylophone

Voices
Male voice a capella for the Fool (sprechstimme)
Male voice a capella for Edgar as Poor Tom (sprechstimme)
SATB chorus a capella

Strings
Harp
1st Violins
2nd Violins
Violas
Cellos
Double basses

In addition to the above, the soundtrack also utilized a shofar. According to Iosif Shapiro, who attended some of the recording sessions for the soundtrack, Shostakovich and Kozintsev were having trouble with a horn call cue. Neither French horn, trumpet, nor trombone produced for them the specific sound they sought. Shapiro mentioned to them the shofars he had seen at his synagogue. He procured for them an elderly shofar player who recorded the cue to their satisfaction. The same musician later appeared playing his instrument in the film.

=== Manuscripts ===
Sketches, rough drafts, and the autograph score are stored in the Shostakovich family archives. Sketches and rough drafts amount to 12 pages of notation on two double and three single-sided sheets of 12-staff music paper. Among these is the sketch for "Departure of the King's Retinue", which is believed to have been composed in Repino in January and February 1970, making it the earliest in this group of manuscripts. The autograph final score is written on twenty sheets of music paper, consisting of four sheets of 12-staff, eight sheets of 24-staff, and eight sheets of 30-staff music paper. Aside from the music itself, these also contain corrections and the composer's side notes written in blue and purple ink, as well as the conductor's markings in pencil and red ink.

The scores for the songs for Poor Tom are stored separately, in the Central State Archives of Literature and Art in Saint Petersburg. They were rediscovered in the early 2010s by Yakov Butovsky, a film scholar, who found them misfiled among documents relating to Kozintsev's Hamlet. Notation for these are written on a single side of 24-staff music paper headed with the title "Poor Tom's Songs", folded horizontally through the middle. Each song bears metronome markings and are numbered sequentially.

== Soundtrack ==
The soundtrack is played by the Leningrad Philharmonic Orchestra, conducted by Dzhemal-Eddin Dalgat and Nikolai Rabinovich. The latter regularly conducted the soundtracks for Shostakovich's film scores.

== Reception ==
King Lear was premiered on February 4, 1972. The film was a success with audiences, while critics singled out Shostakovich's music for exceptional praise. Later that year, the film was released in the West, where it met with similar approbation. Michael Billington in the Birmingham Post said that Shostakovich's "exciting score" contributed to Kozintsev's "stunning film". Kozintsev credited Shostakovich for much of the film's triumph with viewers and the press, according to a posthumously published interview with Ronald Hayman:

I think his understanding of the whole tragic and grotesque imagery in Shakespeare is perfect. ... I think this is a real voice of Shakespeare and I'm very grateful to Shostakovich. When I hear Shostakovich's music I think I've heard Shakespeare's verse. It is possible to cut some of the verse if you have his score to substitute, and I did actually make cuts specially because of music he wrote and in many places in my script, before I begin to shoot, I know that I will be using not human voices but the voice of Shostakovich's music. In the storm scene, for instance, the main voice is the music. It's a victory of evil, of the whole power of the evil of cruelty.

In a letter dated August 9, 1972, Shostakovich remarked to Kozintsev, "Our Lear seems to be a success in many countries".

== Influence ==
One of the works that Shostakovich composed simultaneously with King Lear was his Thirteenth String Quartet. Shortly after completing the film score, he completed the chamber work on August 10, 1970. The quartet is bookended by sections based on the "Lamentation" from King Lear. Olga Dombrovskaya, who wrote the explanatory note for DSCH Publishers' New Collected Works edition of the film score, suggests that "The Storm" and "The Storm (Beginning)" cues may have also influenced the quartet's coda.
