= Antiformalist Rayok =

Satirical cantata by Dmitri Shostakovich

- by Dmitri Shostakovich
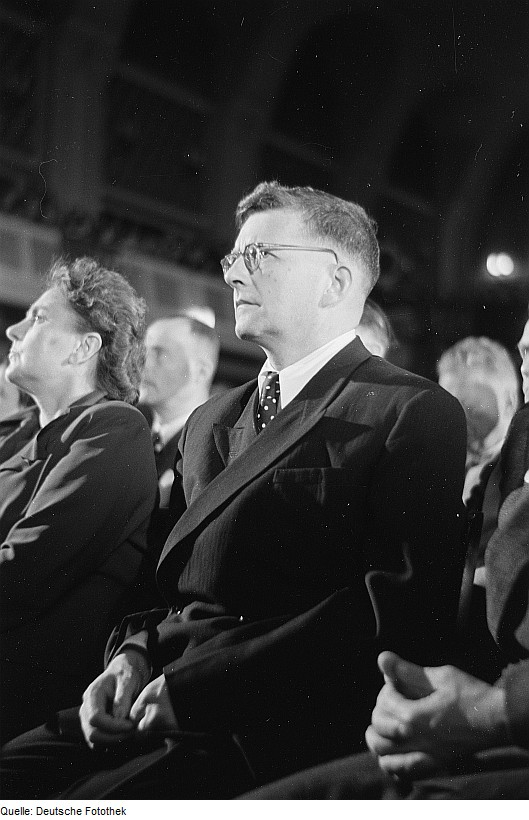
- Shostakovich in 1950
- Genre: cantata
- Text: Dmitri Shostakovich
- Language: Russian
- Published: 1991
- Publisher: Hans Sikorski Musikverlage, DSCH Publishers
- Duration: 18 minutes
- Scoring: four basses, mixed choir, piano, and narrator

Premiere
- Date: 12 January 1989
- Location: Kennedy Center Concert Hall, Washington, D.C.
- Conductor: Mstislav Rostropovich
- Performers: Julian Rodescu, Eric Halfvarson, Andrew Wentzel, Jonathan Deutsch, Members of the Choral Arts Society of Washington

Antiformalist Rayok (Russian: Антиформалистический раёк), also known as Learner's Manual, without opus number, is a rayok or satirical cantata for four voices, chorus, and piano by Dmitri Shostakovich. It is subtitled As an aid to students: the struggle of the realistic and formalistic directions in music. It satirizes the conferences that resulted from the Zhdanov decree of 1948 and the anti-formalism campaign in Soviet arts which followed it.

The work includes quotations from Andrei Zhdanov's speech at the Conference of the Musicians at the Central Committee of the all-Union Party in Moscow in January 1948. The libretto also incorporates Dmitri Shepilov's speech at the Second Congress of Composers in 1957, in which he mispronounces the name of the composer Nikolai Rimsky-Korsakov (KorSAkov). In regard to music, there are references to the traditional Georgian folk song "Suliko", Joseph Stalin's favourite song, and the popular Russian folk tunes "Kalinka" and "Kamarinskaya". It also contains musical excerpts from Tikhon Chrennikov's film music True friends and Robert Planquette's operetta Les cloches de Corneville. In addition, the note sequence D–E♭–C–B, the composer's own monogram based on German note names (D–S–C–H), occurs once in the cantata in a different key.

Antiformalist Rayok was not performed publicly during the composer's lifetime. Nonetheless, Shostakovich planned to publish the work in the early 1960s and had intended Opus No. 114 for it. The premiere of Symphony No. 13 "Babi Yar" (1962), which had provoked enormous disapproval among the Soviet leadership of the Communist Party (the symphony's song text denounces the Soviet anti-Semitism of the time), was probably the main reason why Shostakovich had not considered publishing his satirical cantata. Antiformalist Rayok was premiered 14 years after the composer's death in 1989.

== Background ==
Conflicting dates are documented for the composition of Antiformalist Rayok. According to Isaak Glikman and the Shostakovich family, the score was begun in 1948, with further revisions in 1957, followed by a finale composed between 1965 and 1968. The finale was not discovered until May 1989 by Veniamin Basner. Lev Lebedinsky recalled that the whole work dates from 1957 and that he, rather than Shostakovich, wrote the text. Current scholarship has not verified Lebedinsky's statements. According to some of the composer's diary notes, it can be assumed that the Soviet poet Yevgeny Dolmatovsky, who had written the lyrics for the cantatas "Song of the forests" op. 81 and "The Sun Shines Over Our Motherland" op. 90, also contributed to the libretto.

Its first public performance was on 12 January 1989 conducted by Mstislav Rostropovich at the Kennedy Center Concert Hall in Washington, D.C. At this concert, the cantata was sung in English and performed without the finale composed in the late 1960s. The premiere of the work in its original version took place at the Bolshoi Hall of the Moscow Conservatory on the composer's 83rd birthday (25 September 1989).

In 1989, Boris Tishchenko orchestrated the piano part. In the 1990s, Vladimir Milman and Vladimir Spivakov made another orchestral version. This version was recorded in 2003 and released by Capriccio.
