= Op. 131 =

In music, Op. 131 stands for Opus number 131. Compositions that are assigned this number include:

- Beethoven – String Quartet No. 14
- Prokofiev – Symphony No. 7
- Schumann – Fantasy in C for violin and orchestra
- Shostakovich – October (symphonic poem)
