= Violin Concerto No. 2 (Shostakovich) =

1967 concerto for violin and orchestra by Dmitri Shostakovich

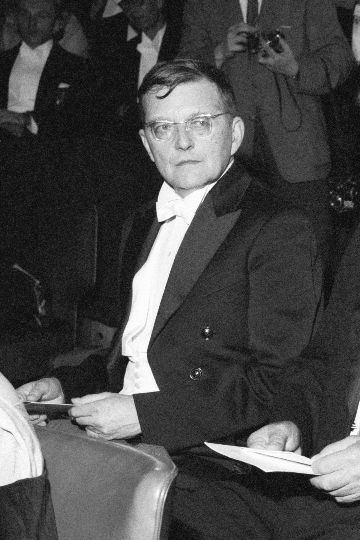
Dmitri Shostakovich in 1958

The Violin Concerto No. 2 in C♯ minor, Op. 129, was Dmitri Shostakovich's last concerto. He wrote it in the spring of 1967 and intended it to serve as a 60th birthday present for its dedicatee, David Oistrakh, in September. Shostakovich had mistaken Oistrakh's age, however; he actually turned 59 that year. (Note: Shostakovich wrote his only Violin Sonata for Oistrakh the following year to make up for this error.) It was premiered unofficially in Bolshevo, near Moscow, on 13 September 1967, and officially on 26 September by Oistrakh and the Moscow Philharmonic under Kirill Kondrashin in Moscow.

== Music ==
The concerto is scored for solo violin, piccolo, flute, two oboes, two clarinets, two bassoons, contrabassoon, four horns, timpani, tom-tom drum and strings.

A performance of the piece lasts approximately 33 minutes. It has three movements:

1. Moderato
2. Adagio
3. Adagio – Allegro

The first movement is in sonata form and concludes with a contrapuntal cadenza. The Adagio is in three parts, with a central accompanied cadenza. The final movement is a complex rondo. It has a slow introduction, three episodes between the refrains, and a further long cadenza before the third episode reprising material from earlier in the work.

The key of C♯ minor is a difficult one for the violin.
