= Rayok =

Folk theatre

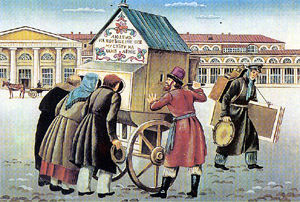
Rayok. 19th century

A rayok (Russian: раёк, IPA: [rɐˈjɵk], lit. "small paradise") was a Russian fairground peep show. Performed using a box with pictures viewed through magnifying lenses, these were accompanied by lewd rhymed jokes. The Fall of Adam and Eve was one of the most popular topics. The term rayok has also come to be applied to rhymed humorous talk shows, without peeping, featuring a kind of rhymed prose. The expression "to talk rayok", говорить райком, thus means to speak in a rhymed, humorous way, to patter. Rayok, in both its peep show and talk show forms, has been an occupation of wandering artists called "rayoshniks". When used as the title for a piece of music, rayok implies a scurrilous entertainment, as in:

- Rayok, an extended song by Modest Mussorgsky also known as Peep-Show
- Anti-formalist Rayok, a cantata by Dmitri Shostakovich also known as Little Paradise, The Gods and A Learner's Manual

== See also ==
- Petrushka
- Vertep
- Zograscope
