= Symphony No. 4 (Shostakovich) =

1936 symphony by Dmitri Shostakovich

- by Dmitri Shostakovich
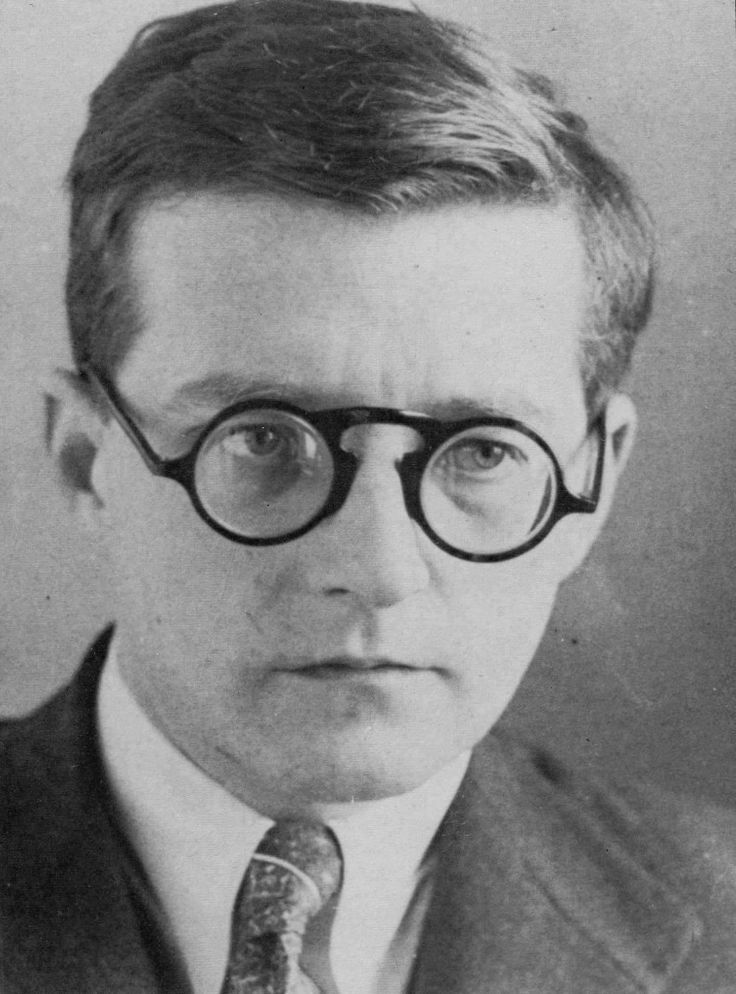
- Shostakovich before 1941
- Key: C minor
- Opus: 43
- Composed: September 1935–May 1936
- Duration: 1 hour
- Movements: 3
- Scoring: Large orchestra

Premiere
- Date: 30 December 1961
- Location: Moscow
- Conductor: Kirill Kondrashin
- Performers: Moscow Philharmonic Orchestra

The Symphony No. 4 in C minor, Op. 43, was composed by Dmitri Shostakovich between September 1935 and May 1936. He had made an earlier, unrelated draft in 1934, but eventually abandoned it. In January 1936, halfway through this period, Pravda—under direct orders from Joseph Stalin—published an editorial "Muddle Instead of Music" that denounced the composer and targeted his opera Lady Macbeth of Mtsensk.

Despite this attack and the political climate of the time, Shostakovich completed the symphony and planned its premiere for December 1936 in Leningrad. After rehearsals began, the orchestra's management cancelled the performance, offering a statement that Shostakovich had withdrawn the work. He may have agreed to withdraw it to relieve orchestra officials of responsibility.

The symphony was premiered on 30 December 1961 by the Moscow Philharmonic Orchestra led by Kirill Kondrashin.

== Instrumentation ==
Shostakovich uses a large orchestra requiring over one hundred musicians. It is scored for the following instruments:

Woodwind
2 Piccolos
4 Flutes
4 Oboes (4th doubling on Cor anglais)
1 E♭ Clarinet
4 Clarinets
1 Bass clarinet
3 Bassoons
1 Contrabassoon

Strings
2 Harps
16–20 1st Violins
14–18 2nd Violins
12–16 Violas
12–16 Cellos
10–14 Double basses

Keyboard
Celesta

Brass
8 Horns
4 Trumpets
3 Trombones
2 Tubas

Percussion
6 Timpani (two players)
Bass drum
Snare drum
Cymbals (crash and suspended, 2 players, one for each)
Triangle
Wood block
Castanets
Tam-tam
Xylophone
Glockenspiel

== Structure ==
The symphony has three movements:

1. Allegretto poco moderato – Presto
2. Moderato con moto
3. Largo – Allegro

Most performances of the symphony last a little over an hour.

== Historical overview ==
=== Composition ===
Shostakovich began the Fourth Symphony in September 1935. His second and third symphonies, completed in 1927 and 1929, had been patriotic works in one movement with choral finales, but the new score was different, not including a choir and subdivided into three distinct movements. Toward the end of 1935 he told an interviewer, "I am not afraid of difficulties. It is perhaps easier, and certainly safer, to follow a beaten path, but it is also dull, uninteresting and futile."

Shostakovich abandoned sketches for the symphony some months earlier and began anew. On 28 January 1936, when he was about halfway through work on the symphony, Pravda printed an unsigned editorial entitled "Muddle Instead of Music", which singled out his internationally successful opera Lady Macbeth of Mtsensk for condemnation. The fact that the editorial was unsigned indicated that it represented the official Party position. Rumors circulated for a long time that Stalin had directly ordered this attack after he attended a performance of the opera and stormed out after the first act.

Pravda published two more articles in the same vein in the next two and a half weeks. On 3 February, "Ballet Falsehood" assailed his ballet The Limpid Stream, and "Clear and Simple Language in Art" appeared on 13 February. Although this last article was technically an editorial attacking Shostakovich for "formalism", it appeared in the "Press Review" section. Stalin, under cover of the Central Committee, may have singled out Shostakovich because the plot and music of Lady Macbeth infuriated him, the opera contradicted Stalin's intended social and cultural direction for the nation at that period, or he resented the recognition Shostakovich was receiving both in the Soviet Union and in the West.

Despite these criticisms, Shostakovich continued work on the symphony—though he simultaneously refused to allow a concert performance of the last act of Lady Macbeth. He explained to a friend, "The audience, of course, will applaud—it's considered bon ton to be in the opposition, and then there'll be another article with a headline like 'Incorrigible Formalist.'"

Once he completed the score, Shostakovich was apparently uncertain how to proceed. His new symphony did not emulate the style of Nikolai Myaskovsky's socialist realist Sixteenth Symphony, The Aviators, or Vissarion Shebalin's song-symphony The Heroes of Perekop. It was composed in a dissonant, avant-garde style, as opposed to the more tonal socialist realist works mentioned above. Showing the new symphony to friends did not help. One asked what Shostakovich thought the reaction from Pravda would be. Shostakovich replied, "I don't write for Pravda, but for myself."

Despite the increasingly repressive political atmosphere, Shostakovich continued to plan for the symphony's premiere, scheduled by the Leningrad Philharmonic Orchestra for 11 December 1936 under the orchestra's music director, Fritz Stiedry. The composer also played the score on piano for Otto Klemperer, who responded enthusiastically and planned to conduct the symphony's first performance outside the USSR in Latin America.

=== Withdrawal ===
After a number of rehearsals that made the musicians increasingly unenthusiastic, Shostakovich met with several officials of the Composers Union and the Communist Party, along with I.M. Renzin, the Philharmonic's director, in the latter's office. He was informed that the 11 December performance was being cancelled and that he was expected to make the announcement and provide an explanation. The composer's direct participation is unknown, but the newspaper Soviet Art (Sovetskoe iskusstvo) published a notice that Shostakovich had asked for the symphony's premiere to be cancelled "on the grounds that it in no way corresponds to his current creative convictions and represents for him a long-outdated creative phase", that it suffered from "grandiosomania" and he planned to revise it.

Decades later, Isaak Glikman, who was Shostakovich's personal secretary in the 1930s and a close friend, provided a different account. He wrote that party officials exerted pressure on Renzin to cancel the scheduled performance, and Renzin, reluctant to take responsibility for the programming decision himself, instead privately persuaded Shostakovich to withdraw the symphony.

=== Premiere ===
The manuscript score for the Fourth Symphony was lost during World War II. Using the orchestral parts that survived from the 1936 rehearsals, Shostakovich had a two-piano version published in an edition of 300 copies in Moscow in 1946. Shostakovich began considering a performance only after Stalin's death in 1953 changed the cultural climate in the Soviet Union. He undertook no revisions. Conductor Kirill Kondrashin led the premiere of the orchestral version on 30 December 1961 with the Moscow Philharmonic Orchestra. The first performance outside the USSR took place at the 1962 Edinburgh Festival with the Philharmonia Orchestra under Gennady Rozhdestvensky on 7 September 1962.

Soviet critics were excited at the prospect of finding a major missing link in Shostakovich's creative output, yet refrained from value-laden comparisons. They generally placed the Fourth Symphony firmly in its chronological context and explored its significance as a way-station on the road to the more conventional Fifth Symphony. Western critics were more overtly judgmental, especially since the Fourth was premiered just three days after the Twelfth Symphony in Edinburgh. The critical success of the Fourth juxtaposed with the critical disdain for the Twelfth led to speculation that Shostakovich's creative powers were on the wane.

== Influence of Mahler ==
The symphony is strongly influenced by Gustav Mahler, whose music Shostakovich had been closely studying with Ivan Sollertinsky during the preceding ten years. (Friends remembered seeing Mahler's Seventh Symphony on Shostakovich's piano at that time.) The duration, the size of the orchestra, the style and range of orchestration, and the recurrent use of "banal" melodic material juxtaposed with more high-minded, even "intellectual" material, all come from Mahler.
