= The Sun Shines Over Our Motherland =

1952 cantata by Dmitri Shostakovich

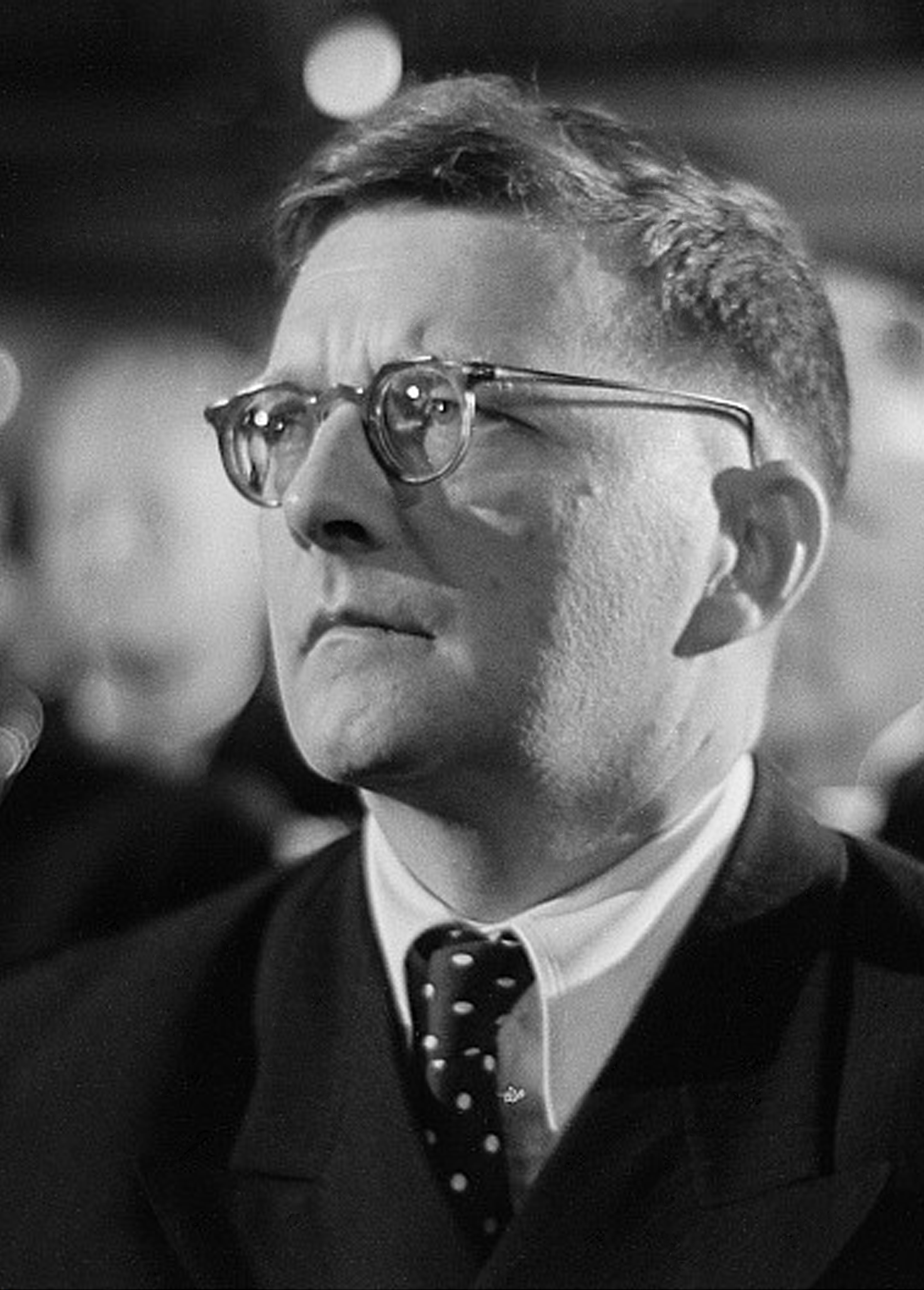
Dmitri Shostakovich in 1950

The Sun Shines Over Our Motherland (Russian: Над Родиной нашей солнце сияет), Op.90 is a cantata composed in 1952 by Dimitri Shostakovich, based on a text by Yevgeny Dolmatovsky. Originally titled Cantata About the Party, it was commissioned to celebrate the 35th anniversary of the October Revolution. In it, the sun is a metaphor for the achievement of the Soviet people under the leadership of the Communist Party. It begins with a lyrical section for boys' chorus and woodwind, followed by a more energetic section for the men's voices.

== Performance and Recording History ==
It was premiered by the USSR Symphony Orchestra and Choir with the Moscow Choir School Boys' Choir under Konstantin Ivanov at the Bolshoi Hall of the Moscow Conservatoire on 6 November 1952. It was recorded in mono with the same forces under Alexander Yurlov after a public concert ten years later. It was re-recorded with the Moscow Philharmonic Orchestra under Kirill Kondrashin in 1965 for Melodiya Records. In the West, the Kondrashin appeared in an His Master's Voice record of 1970, and again in a box of Shostakovich symphonies mainly under the direction of Kondrashin (1975).

More recently, it was recorded by Mikhail Jurowski with the Kölner Rundfunk-Symphonie-Orchester on Capriccio Records, and a live recording of Paavo Järvi with the Estonian National Symphony Orchestra and the Estonian Concert Choir on Erato Records.

Because of the nature of the text, it remains a highly controversial work to perform. Paavo Jarvi's performance of the work in 2011 caused outrage amongst many in Estonia, to the point of him receiving death threats.

== Lyrics ==
The original lyrics begin:

Над Родиной нашей, страной созиданья, солнце сияет. Великие стройки, высотные зданья оно озаряет.

(Transliterated as: Over our homeland, our country of birth, the sun shines. Great buildings and monuments, it illuminates.)

== Recordings ==
- USSR Symphony Orchestra, Alexander Yurlov (Original recording 1961, Russian Disc 1994)
- Moscow Philharmonic Orchestra, Kirill Kondrashin (Original recording 1967, Melodiya)
- Kölner Rundfunks-Symphonie-Orchester, Mikhail Jurowski (Capriccio, 1999)
- Shostakovich: Cantatas - Estonian Concert Choir, ENSO Paavo Järvi (Erato 2015)
