= Op. 136 =

In music, Op. 136 stands for Opus number 136. Compositions that are assigned this number include:

- Beethoven – Der glorreiche Augenblick
- Schumann – Hermann und Dorothea
- Shostakovich – Loyalty
