= Loyalty (Shostakovich) =

1970 song cycle for male choir by Dmitri Shostakovich

- by Dmitri Shostakovich
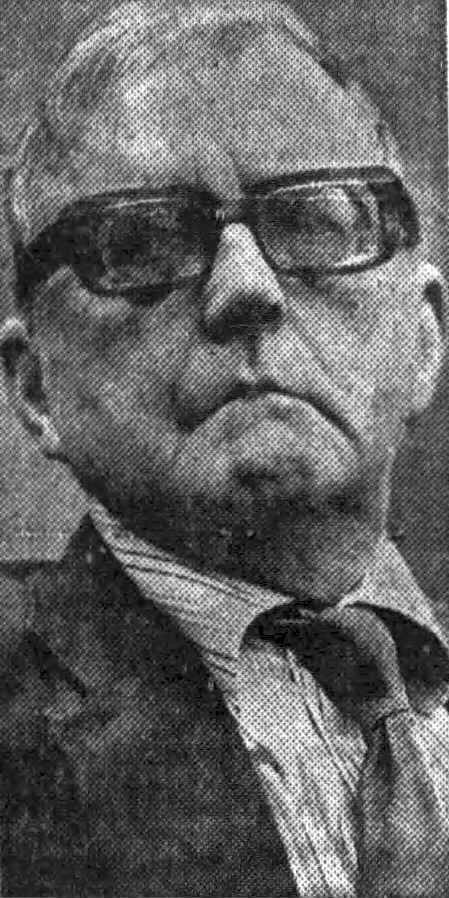
- Dmitri Shostakovich in June 1973
- Opus: 136
- Occasion: Centennial of the birth of Vladimir Lenin
- Text: Yevgeny Dolmatovsky
- Language: Russian
- Composed: February 13, 1970
- Dedication: Gustav Ernesaks
- Published: 1970
- Publisher: Hans Sikorski Musikverlage
- Duration: 25 minutes
- Movements: 8
- Scoring: Men's chorus a capella

Premiere
- Date: December 5, 1970
- Location: Estonia Theatre; Tallinn, Estonian SSR
- Conductor: Gustav Ernesaks
- Performers: Estonian SSR State Academic Male Choir

Loyalty (Russian: Верность, romanized: Vyernost'; also translated as Faith, Truth, Correctness, Faithfulness, or Fidelity), Op. 136 is a cycle of eight ballads for men's chorus a capella composed by Dmitri Shostakovich based upon texts by Yevgeny Dolmatovsky. It was composed in commemoration of the centennial of Vladimir Lenin's birth in 1970.

Shostakovich had contemplated composing a vocal work in tribute to Lenin as early as 1968; by 1969, he announced that he was envisioning a work in oratorio form. A visit to a mass song event in the Estonian SSR that same year helped him to settle on composing Loyalty as an a capella work for men's chorus. He composed it for and dedicated it to choral conductor Gustav Ernesaks, but did not inform him about the work until after it was completed.

Sources conflict as to when and where Shostakovich began Loyalty, but the score was completed on February 13, 1970. It was premiered in Tallinn, Estonian SSR on December 5 sung by the Estonian SSR State Academic Male Choir conducted by Ernesaks. The work was received warmly in the Soviet Union, but has been mostly ignored and derided elsewhere.

== Background ==
Compositions for a cappella chorus were rare in Shostakovich's work. He said in a 1951 interview with Vechernyaya Moskva that his first such composition, numbers in film scores notwithstanding, was the Ten Poems on Texts by Revolutionary Poets from 1950, which developed his interest to continue writing for choirs.

Shostakovich had begun to contemplate composing a work to commemorate the centennial of Lenin's birth as early as December 1968. In a speech he gave at the Fourth All-Union Congress of Composers, he closed by saying:

It is the duty of all Soviet composers to celebrate this anniversary with dignity. And the best gift for the anniversary will be new beautiful works lauding the image of the beloved leader, the greatness of the achievements of the Soviet people building communism.

In April 1969, Shostakovich announced that he had begun to work on an oratorio. In July of that same year, he visited Estonia and attended the XVII Estonian Song Festival, which closed with a rendition led by Gustav Ernesaks of his setting of Lydia Koidula's "Mu isamaa on minu arm". The performance, which was sung by a choir of children and adults that numbered over 30,000 singers, impressed the composer, who had known Ernesaks since March 1943. After the performance, Shostakovich kept a booklet commemorating the 25th anniversary of the Estonian SSR State Academic Male Choir, which Ernesaks founded.

== Composition ==
In March 1970, Shostakovich wrote in an article for Sovietskaya Muzyka:

The life and work of Lenin have always been, are, and always will be an inspiring example for Soviet cultural workers. [...] I am proud that over many years I have witnessed the flourishing of Soviet music, developing under the guidance of the Leninist Communist Party of the Soviet Union. In this historic year, a hundred years on from Lenin's birth, each one of us must look back over the path we have covered, study the present state of Soviet art and make plans for the future. [...] We must produce works which are worthy of our great, immortal leader, Vladimir Lenin.

Ernesaks believed that the impetus for Shostakovich to compose Loyalty could be traced back to when he attended the Festival of Soviet Estonian Art in 1956, where he led a delegation representing Moscow musicians that met the Estonian SSR State Academic Male Choir. Shostakovich subsequently noted in his diary reminders to send greetings to the conductor on his birthday.

In preparation for his own musical tribute to Lenin, Shostakovich extensively researched and studied earlier scores dedicated to the Bolshevik leader, including those by Alexander Kastalsky, Alexander Davidenko, Vissarion Shebalin, and Mikhail Chulaki. The latter's Lenin With Us, for choir a capella in eight movements, directly influenced the creation of Loyalty. Shostakovich requested new texts for Loyalty from Yevgeny Dolmatovsky, with whom he had collaborated previously on Song of the Forests and The Sun Shines Over Our Motherland, among other works. "Shostakovich suggested that I think about what Lenin means to us," the poet recalled. "We met several times in the silence of his Moscow apartment, sitting together for long periods of time and talking or being silent. That was probably the greatest moment of collaboration, and then, as if to imitate the composer's manner, I wrote down the main points of our conversations in verse and brought them to him."

Dates conflict as to when Loyalty was composed. According to Sofia Khentova, the cycle was begun on February 25 and completed on June 6, 1970, in Repino. The editor of the 1985 complete works edition of the score, Alexander Pirumov, dates the completion of the score to February 13 in the same town. Dolmatovsky and Laurel Fay wrote that Shostakovich completed Loyalty around April 1970 while he was a patient at Gavriil Ilizarov's clinic in Kurgan. Both the 1985 and 2016 complete works edition of the score dates the completion of the score to February 13. After finishing the score, Shostakovich sent the score to be prepared for publication and performance. Unusually, he notated the tenor part using a tenor rather than a treble clef. The last time a major Russian composer used such a clef similarly was when Pyotr Ilyich Tchaikovsky used it in two choruses for his opera The Queen of Spades, which may have possibly been a model for Shostakovich's use.

In spite of the physical fatigue he felt as a result of medical treatment, the composer worked on Loyalty, the Thirteenth Quartet, and his score to Grigori Kozintsev's film King Lear simultaneously.

Although Loyalty was intended for Ernesaks and dedicated to him, Shostakovich did not inform him that the score was forthcoming. The conductor first learned of the work from a choir member who had read a news article announcing that Shostakovich was composing a work for a cappella male choir. It was only when Ernesaks received the score in the mail on March 22 that he realized it was composed for him and his choir. Surprised, he told Shostakovich that he could not prepare a performance in time for the Lenin centennial. Instead, he proposed a premiere at the end of 1970. Shostakovich informed Dolmatovsky of the delay, which disappointed the poet. "But we will be given a first-class performance," the composer said, then added that he was "glad and proud" to have composed the work. He repeated his pride in the work in remarks he gave before the Moscow premiere.

== Music ==
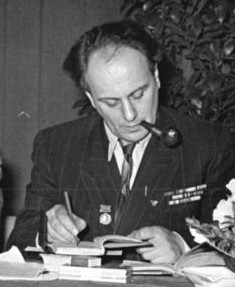
Poet Yevgeny Dolmatovsky (pictured here in 1954) collaborated with Shostakovich on the texts

Loyalty consists of eight movements scored for four-part men's chorus:

1. As From Time Immemorial
2. The People Believed in a Flame
3. The Great Name
4. The Banner of the Revolution
5. The Difficult Search for Beauty
6. I Wish to Learn Everything About Him
7. This is How the People Were
8. On Meetings of the Younger Generation

A typical performance lasts approximately 25 minutes.

=== Arrangements ===
After Shostakovich's death, "I Wish to Learn Everything About Him" was arranged for children's choir by Vladislav Sokolov and included in the collection Crimson Stars: Songs and Choruses for Schoolchildren. Sokolov sent a copy to Shostakovich's widow, Irina, with a dedication expressing gratitude for having the collection "illuminated" by the music of the "ever cherished Shostakovich".

== Premiere ==
In late 1970, the score to Loyalty was printed; three of its ballads were also printed in the September issue of Sovietskaya Muzyka. Ernesaks began to rehearse his choir around this time, although he and his singers found the work challenging. Shostakovich arrived in Tallinn a few days before the premiere in order to supervise the rehearsals, which Ernesaks recalled increased tension and nervousness among the choristers:

The preparations were difficult. The high tessitura of the parts demanded especially precise intonation. [...] The musical language of Shostakovich seemed to us too orchestral. [...] The subtlety of the tempo and imagistic contrasts between the movements caused us enormous difficulty. We [...] had not ever polished the work of such a major master in his presence. [...] I listened attentively to [Shostakovich's] words, trying to deduce what remained unsaid. There were a few comments, but all of them were constructive and to the point. And some of them were expressed later, not at the rehearsal, but in casual conversation.

The world premiere of Loyalty took place December 5, 1970, at the Estonia Theatre, with Ernesaks conducting the Estonian SSR State Academic Male Choir. Shostakovich's work shared the program with music by Veljo Tormis, a composer whose music he supported. The performance marked the chorus' 3000th concert. According to Ernesaks, Shostakovich "modestly accepted the audience's enthusiasm" and remarked that in the future he hoped to acquaint himself better with the male choir as an "instrument", which he felt he did not know well enough. "Gustav Ernesaks is a brilliant master," the composer wrote after the world premiere. "I have heard many excellent male choirs, both Soviet and foreign, but the superb ensemble started up by Ernesaks, which recently celebrated its 25th anniversary, is the best of the lot.

Following was the Moscow premiere, which took place on February 25, 1971 with the same performers at the Large Hall of the Moscow Conservatory. The performance was televised and was preceded with spoken remarks by Shostakovich. Ernesaks expressed pleasure with his choir's performance, saying that they "delved more deeply into the meaning of the work."

=== Recording ===
In 1971, the Estonian SSR State Academic Male Choir conducted by Ernesaks made the premiere recording of Loyalty for Melodiya, which was prepared for a special edition LP issued in commemoration of that year's 24th Congress of the Communist Party of the Soviet Union. Ernesaks and all the members of his choir inscribed a copy of the recording and sent it to Shostakovich, who replied thanking them for their "magnificent recording".

== Reception ==
=== Soviet Union ===
Conductor Arvo Ratassepp, who reviewed the world premiere concert for Serp i Molot, called the performance the greatest event in the musical life of Estonia:

We hope that this is only the beginning ... The potential of the male choir might inspire [Shostakovich] to write new works in the future.

Georgy Sviridov wrote an appreciative review of the Moscow premiere of Loyalty in Pravda, holding up the cycle's first ballad for especial praise. He described its "background of lingering notes sustained by the tenors, the basses leading into their raspy recitative, typically Russian". He also said that "the composer's new work continues the thread of his art connected with prominent social and political content". Sviridov also exalted the "ideal coordination" and the "virtuosic command of the entire palette of expressive means" demonstrated by the Estonian SSR State Academic Male Choir conducted by Ernesaks, calling their performance the "vibrant event" of the 1970 musical season.

Other reviewers also noted the cycle's stylistic connections to other works by Shostakovich. In his review for Vechernyaya Moskva, Gavriil Yudin praised the simplicity of Loyalty as something "only the greatest masters could achieve".

The Moscow premiere was also discussed in Izvestia and Sovetskaya Kultura. Shostakovich was awarded a Glinka State Prize of the RSFSR for Loyalty in 1974.

=== In the West ===
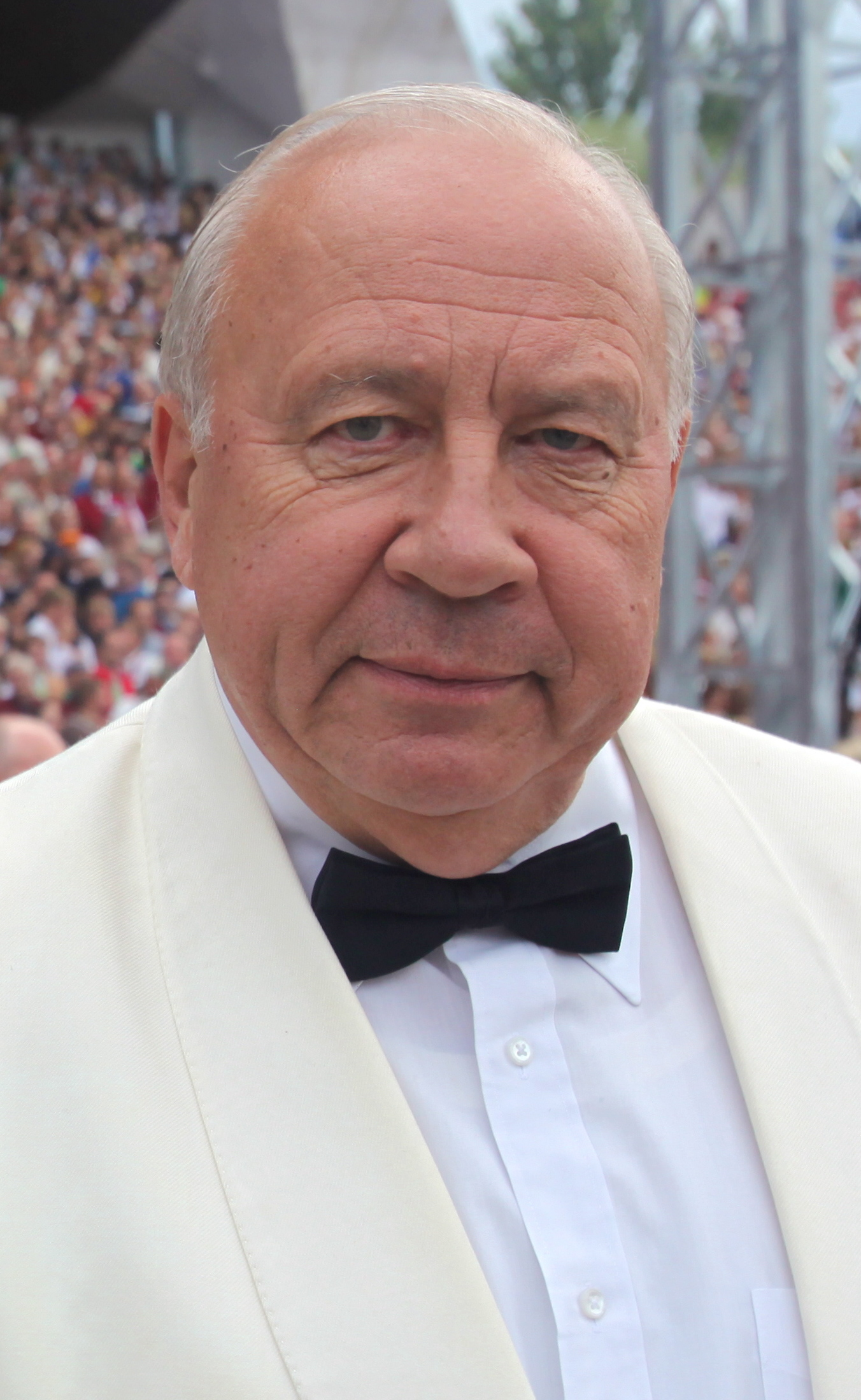
Neeme Järvi praised Loyalty for its "high artistic qualities"

Reaction to Loyalty outside of the Soviet Union was mixed. Krzysztof Meyer dismissed the work as "another ceremonial work, marked by the lack, apparently intentional, of originality and fresh ideas." In her biography of Shostakovich, Pauline Fairclough described Dolmatovsky's texts as "truly dreadful" and that their "favorable comparisons of Lenin to Confucius, Buddha, and Allah achieved new levels of ludicrous flattery."

In 1997, BMG reissued a selection of Neeme Järvi's early recordings for Melodiya on six compact discs. The conductor wrote in the preface to its liner notes that he had insisted on including Ernesaks' recording of Loyalty in the series:

As we all know, Soviet composers such as Prokofiev and Shostakovich were forced to please their rulers and compose to their directions, but it is indisputable that in spite of this their music often had high artistic qualities. This is one reason why I have chosen Loyalty by Shostakovich for this edition. It is an a capella work, glorifying Lenin, and dedicated to the founding father of Estonian choir music, Gustav Ernesaks and his choir, the Estonian State Academic Male Choir. The choir, founded during the war and led by him, had qualities which no other men's choir could approach—or ever will.

Reviewing the BMG CD, Mark Stryker wrote in the Detroit Free Press that the work's "anthem-like songs" were "curious, but compelling."

In his defense of Loyalty, Gerard McBurney wrote:

Anyone who likes to see Shostakovich in simplified terms as a "secret resister" to the Soviet regime, will have something of a problem with this 20-minute cycle of ballads for unaccompanied male-voice chorus, to maudlin texts by the patriotic poet Dolmatovsky in celebration of the life and work of Lenin. For whatever Shostakovich truly thought about Leninism and Communism and this kind of socialist-realist poetry—and these are matters that will be debated for many years to come—these a capella chorus works cannot easily be dismissed as mere cynical time-serving. However weak their words, these eight choruses are powerful and dramatically impressive essays in Shostakovich’s pared-down late style, with a disturbing sense of genuine grandeur and tragedy, consciously and carefully reinventing the grandeur of 19th century Russian choral-writing to modern ends. Shostakovich was not a religious believer and he wrote no church music. In a strange way, this work is the nearest he came to music of this kind. Perhaps, when the dust of our age has settled, performers will be brave enough to return to this work. For it has something important to tell us beyond the unconvincing message of the words.

== Sources ==
- Dolmatovsky, Yevgeny (1976). "Переполненный музыкой". In Shneerson, Grigory (ed.). Д. Шостакович. Статьи и материалы (in Russian). Moscow: Советский композитор.
- Fay, Laurel (2000). Shostakovich: A Life. Oxford University Press. ISBN 0-19-513438-9.
- Khentova, Sofia (1985). Шостакович. Жизнь и творчество, Т. 2 (in Russian). Moscow: Советский композитор.
- Shostakovich, Dmitri (1981). Grigoryev, L.; Platek, Ya. (eds.). Dmitry Shostakovich: About Himself and his Times. Moscow: Progress Publishers.
- Shostakovich, Dmitri (1985). Pirumov, Alexander (ed.). Collected Works in Forty-Two Volumes, Volume 34. Moscow: Muzika.
- Shostakovich, Dmitri (2016). Ekimovsky, Viktor (ed.). Dmitri Shostakovich: New Collected Works. VIIth Series: Choral Compositions. 85th Volume: Loyalty. With a critical commentary on the history of the scores and explanatory notes on the holographs by Maria Karachevskaya. Moscow: DSCH Publishers. ISMN 979-0-706427-15-7.

== See also ==
- Symphony No. 2 "To October"
- Symphony No. 12 "The Year 1917"
- October
