= Raree show =

Form of visual entertainment

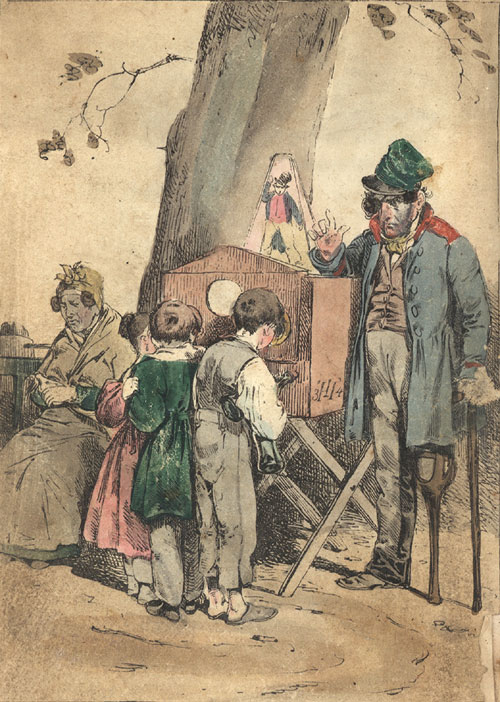
A boy looks into a peep show device (illustration by Theodor Hosemann, 1835)

A raree show, peep show or peep box is an exhibition of pictures or objects (or a combination of both), viewed through a small hole or magnifying glass. In 17th- and 18th-century Europe, it was a popular form of entertainment provided by wandering showmen.

== History ==
Peep shows, also known as peep box or raree show ("rarity show") can be traced back to the early modern period (15th century in Europe) and are known in various cultures.

According to a 15th-century Italian manuscript biography, later published by 18th-century historian Ludovico Antonio Muratori (1672–1750), the Italian humanist author, artist Leon Battista Alberti (1404–1472) created wonderful painted pictures exhibited inside a box with a small aperture. He had two kinds: night scenes with the moon and stars, and day scenes. It is thought these pictures may have been transparent and lit alternately from the front and from behind, with parts painted on the back causing changes in the scene. However, it has also been suggested that Alberti's box was an early image projector; a predecessor of the magic lantern.

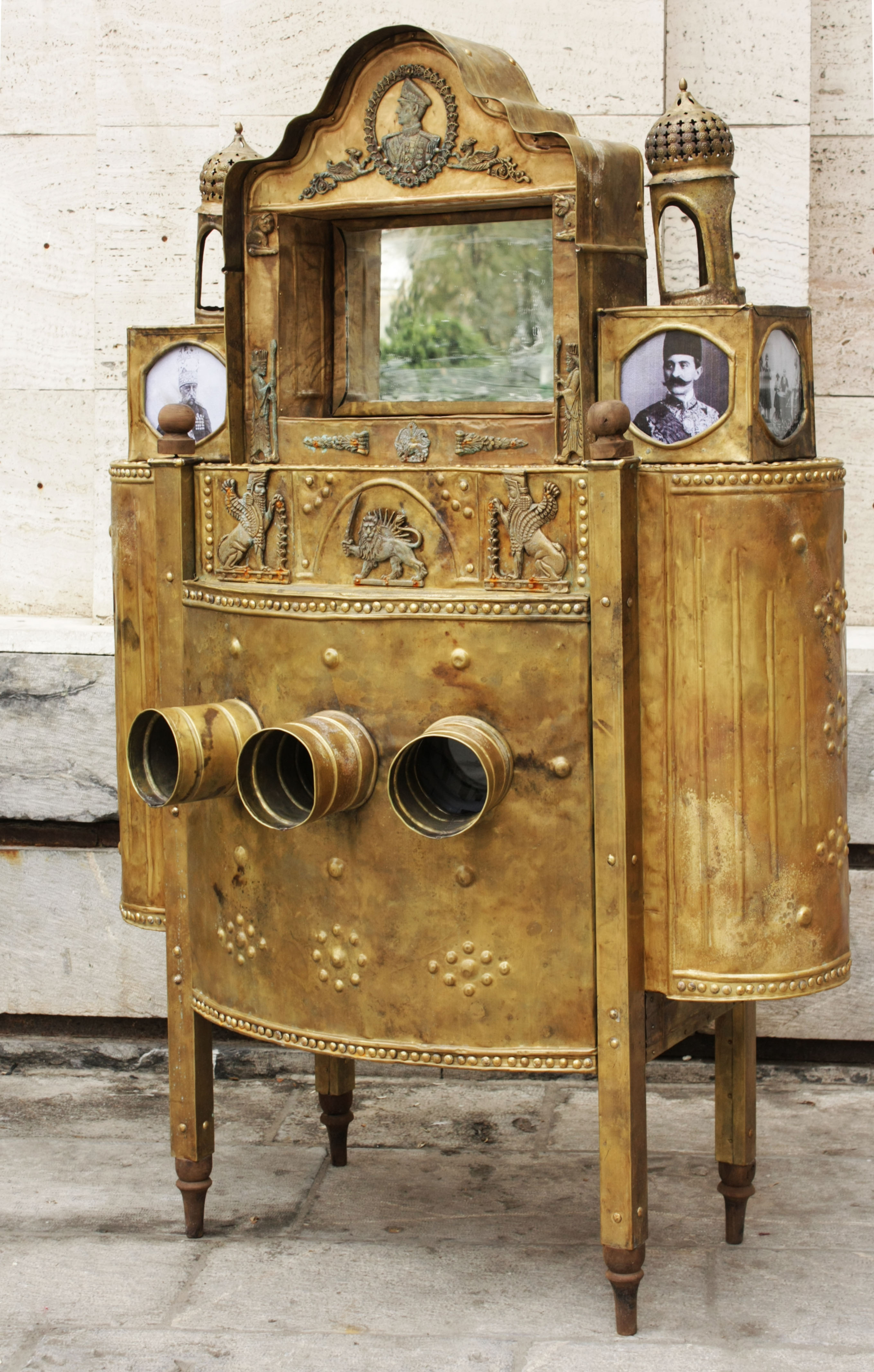
Peep show in Golestan Palace, Tehran

In the 17th and 18th centuries, peep shows were exhibited on streets and fairs across Europe by itinerant showmen, competing with other entertainment like dancing bears, jugglers, conjurers, et cetera. Their wooden cabinets could have several viewing holes and contain sets of pictures to be set into a viewing position by pulling a corresponding string. The show was accompanied by spoken recitation that explained or dramatized what was happening inside. The boxes were often decorated inside to resemble theatrical scenes.

Peep shows were most popular in the 17th century in Holland. Some artists from the 17th-century Dutch Golden Age painting, like Pieter Janssens Elinga and Samuel Dirksz van Hoogstraten created a type of peep shows with an illusion of depth perception by manipulating the perspective of the view seen inside, usually the interior of a room. From around 1700 many of these "perspective boxes" or "optica" had a bi-convex lens with a large diameter and small dioptre for an exaggerated perspective, giving a stronger illusion of depth. Most pictures showed architectural and topographical subjects with linear perspectives. From around 1745 similar perspective view prints became very popular for the zograscope, which used the same principle with the lens on a stand rather than in a box. Peep shows were further developed with translucent painting techniques, perforations and cut-out shapes that provided special effects when lit from behind by candles. Changing the light from the front to the back of the picture could change the scene from day to night, much like the dissolving views that would later become a popular type of magic lantern show.

In the early 18th century perspective boxes (called megane in Japanese (眼鏡) and inspired the art of Megane-e) were very appreciated in Japan, where they were referred to as Holland machines (和蘭眼鏡, Oranda megane, more accurately holland glasses). The Dutch brought the first such device to Japan in the 1640s as a gift to the shōgun, but the devices became popular only after the Chinese popularized them about 1758, after which they began to influence Japanese artists.

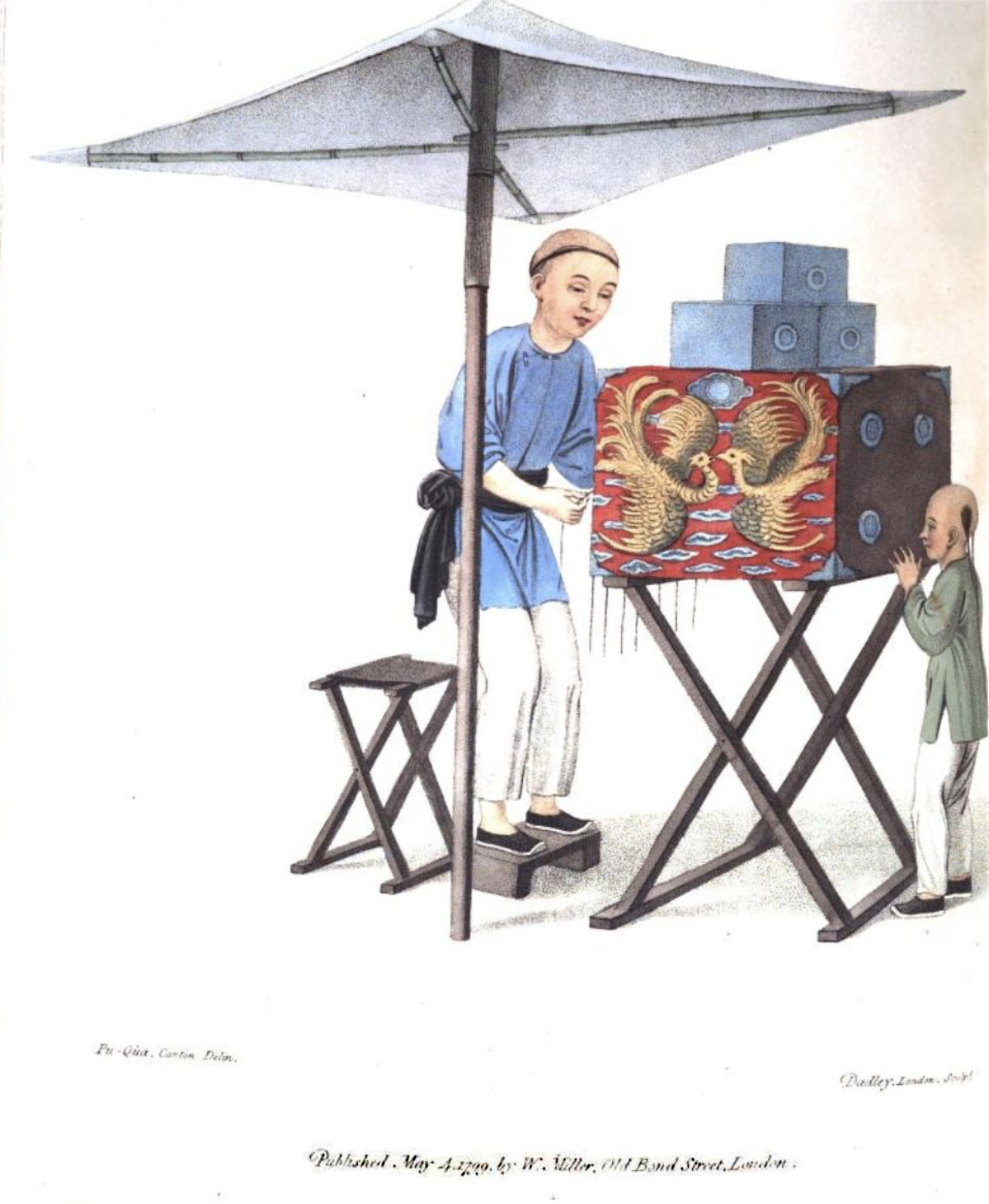
Engraving of a drawing of a Chinese peep show by 'Pu-Qua(蒲呱)' of Canton engraved by Dadley, published May 4, 1799 by W. Miller, Old Bond Street, London

19th-century Chinese peep shows were known by many names including la yang p'ien (Chinese: 拉洋片; pinyin: lā yáng piān; lit. 'pulling foreign picture cards'). Sometimes the showman would perform for a crowd with puppets or pictures outside the box and then charge people extra to look through the holes. In Ottoman Syria a form of peep show called sanduk al-ajayib (صندوق العجائب, "wonder box") existed, which the storyteller carried on his back. The box had six holes through which people could see scenes backlit by a central candle. Sanduk al-ajayib stories were about contemporary figures and events, or showed scenes of heaven and hell.

Other common subjects in peep shows throughout the world have been exotic views and animals, scenes of classical drama or masques, court ceremonies, surprise transformations (e.g., of an angel into a devil) and lewd pictures.

Raree shows were precursors of toy theatres, with movable scenes and paper figurines, popular in the 19th century. They can also be seen as predecessors to optical toys like Chinese fireworks, the diorama, the stereoscope and the magic lantern.

Some peep shows offer the only accurate representation of the stage design and scenery of the masques and pageants of their time.

== See also ==
- Peep show, the erotic equivalent
- Early motion pictures were presented in peep boxes, such as the kinetoscope and the mutoscope.
- Stanhope (optical bijou)
