= Symphony No. 12 (Shostakovich) =

1961 symphony by Dmitri Shostakovich

- The Year 1917
- by Dmitri Shostakovich
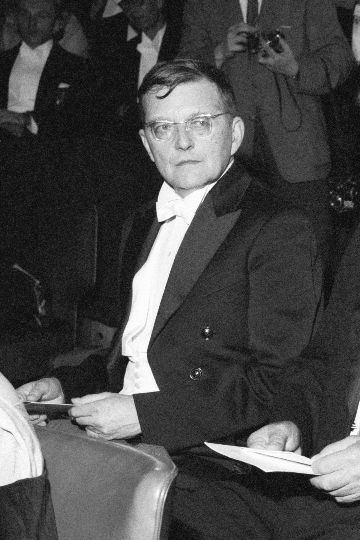
- Shostakovich in 1958
- Key: D minor
- Opus: 112
- Composed: 1961
- Dedication: In memory of Vladimir Lenin
- Duration: 40 minutes
- Movements: 4
- Scoring: Orchestra

Premiere
- Date: 1 October 1961
- Location: Leningrad
- Conductor: Yevgeny Mravinsky
- Performers: Leningrad Philharmonic Orchestra

Symphony No. 12 in D minor, Op. 112, titled The Year 1917, was composed by Dmitri Shostakovich in 1961. He dedicated it to the memory of Vladimir Lenin. Although the performance on 1 October 1961, by the Leningrad Philharmonic Orchestra conducted by Yevgeny Mravinsky was billed as the official premiere, the actual first performance took place two hours earlier that same day in Kuybyshev by the Kuybyshev State Philharmonic Orchestra conducted by Abram Stasevich.

== Form ==
The symphony, which is scored for large orchestra, runs 38 to 40 minutes. It is divided into four movements, which are played without pause:

1. Revolutionary Petrograd (about 14 minutes): Moderato—Allegro—Più mosso—Allegro
  The first movement quotes a revolutionary song with the words "shame on you tyrants" and the Polish song The Warsaw March, both of which appear in the finale of Symphony No. 11.
2. Razliv (about 10 minutes): Allegro (L'istesso tempo)—Adagio
  The second movement further quotes Symphony No. 11 and Shostakovich's early Funeral March for the Victims of the Revolution. It depicts Lenin's countryside headquarters at Razliv, outside Petrograd.
3. Aurora (about 4 minutes): Adagio (L'istesso tempo)—Allegro
  The third movement is in scherzo form. Aurora was the cruiser that fired at the Winter Palace and began the Russian Revolution.
4. The Dawn of Humanity (about 10 minutes): Allegro (L'istesso tempo)—Allegretto—Moderato
  The fourth movement represents Soviet life after the guidance of Lenin. The funeral march quotation is transformed into a jubilant theme, before a celebratory conclusion.

== Instrumentation ==
The symphony is scored for:

Woodwinds
3 flutes (3rd doubling piccolo)
3 oboes
3 clarinets (B♭ and A)
3 bassoons (3rd doubling contrabassoon)
Brass
4 horns
3 trumpets (B♭)
3 trombones
tuba

Percussion

timpani
bass drum
triangle
snare drum
cymbals
tam-tam

Strings

1st violins
2nd violins
violas
cellos
double basses

== Overview ==
=== Composition ===
Shostakovich had attempted, or at least announced his intent, to compose a symphony depicting Lenin as far back as the latter 1930s, elaborating on the subject in more than half a dozen interviews over two and a half years. He had planned this symphony as a biographical drama, tracing Lenin from his youth to the new Soviet society he had created and using text by such writers as Vladimir Mayakovsky. In December 1940 Shostakovich admitted that he had overreached and failed to write a Lenin cantata based on Mayakovsky's text. But reports of a Lenin symphony continued well into 1941, dissipating only with the German invasion that June.

By the summer of 1959, Shostakovich again mentioned that he had a major work commemorating Lenin underway. "What form my idea will take, whether it will be an oratorio, a cantata, a symphony, or a symphonic poem, I don't want to predict. One thing is clear: the effort to embody the mighty image of the greatest man of our most complex epoch will demand the exertion of all creative resources." Though Shostakovich expressed the desire to have the work ready for the 90th anniversary of Lenin's birth in April 1960, the date came and went without its completion. Progress was slowed further when the composer fell and broke his left leg at his son Maxim's wedding in October 1960. He completed the work the following year.

=== Analysis ===
Like the Eleventh Symphony, the Twelfth is programmatic. Programmatic rather than musical considerations dictate its form, the subtitle and movement titles commemorating the Russian Revolution. But while, like the Eleventh, it has four movements played without break, the Twelfth does not recapture the sense of newsreel commentary that characterized the Eleventh. Instead, the movements become a series of reflections, as though one is watching a series of tableaux. (For this reason, the Twelfth was called a "folk heroic epic", as opposed to the Eleventh, a "folk music drama".) The Twelfth is also unlike its other direct ancestor, the experimental Second Symphony, in being extremely traditional, with the fast opening movement laid out along academically correct lines such as Myaskovsky and his teacher Glazunov followed.

=== Political considerations ===
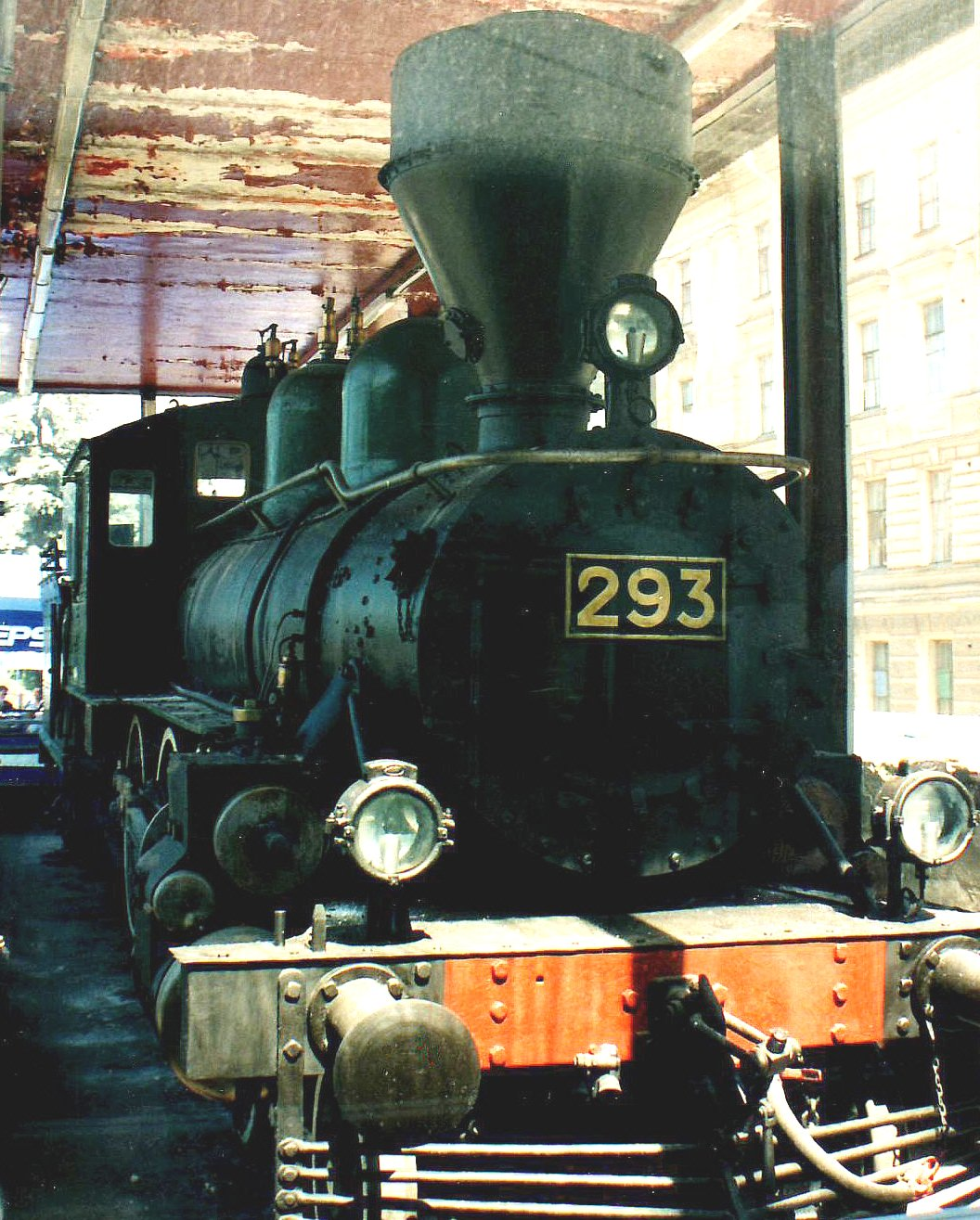
Locomotive of Lenin’s train, on which he arrived at Finland Station, Petrograd in April, 1917

That some critics, especially in the West, consider the Twelfth among the least satisfying musically of Shostakovich's symphonies cannot be attributed to a creative slump, given that he had recently written the First Cello Concerto for Rostropovich and the Eighth String Quartet. Shostakovich had become a Party member in 1960 and may have felt compelled to write a Party line symphony to protect himself. That the composer would have felt compelled to do so in the midst of the Khrushchev Thaw could be questioned, and the government at this point in his career may have found it more politically expedient to exploit Shostakovich than to harass him. Still, the 1948 Zhdanov Doctrine had been rescinded only in 1958, and Shostakovich had not forgotten his 1936 denunciation. Nor was he totally free to express what he wished, as the political controversy over his Thirteenth Symphony would soon prove. Because of these circumstances, some critics have suggested that the Twelfth represents an unwelcome infiltration of officialdom into Shostakovich's main compositional oeuvre, aside from his patriotic film scores and other commissioned works.

It has also been surmised that the naiveté of the Twelfth's program, structure and thematic invention indicate that Shostakovich wrote it quickly after abandoning an earlier, possibly rashly satirical draft. The source of this story was the composer's friend Lev Lebidinsky, whom the composer contacted a few days before the work's premiere. This theory has two major challenges. First, Shostakovich had only a few days in which to rewrite a 40-minute symphony. Second, the work had already been performed before the Union of Composers on 8 September, so any substantial changes would have attracted considerable attention and comment. Although only a detailed analysis of the manuscript can confirm it, what seems more likely is that Shostakovich reconsidered his conception of the symphony radically between the summer of 1960 and the summer of 1961, when he completed the work.

=== Reception ===
The Twelfth Symphony was well received in the Soviet Union, though more coolly than its predecessor. The Eleventh was received fairly warmly in the West due in part to its assumed allusion to the Hungarian uprising of 1956, but the Twelfth's apparently pro-Communist subject matter led to a poor reception there. The first UK performance took place at the Edinburgh Festival on 4 September 1962 with the composer present. It was compared unfavourably with the Fourth Symphony, which received its first performance outside of Russia just three days later. The critical success of the Fourth juxtaposed with the critical disdain for the Twelfth led to speculation that Shostakovich's creative powers were on the wane. Western listeners became more receptive after the Cold War but the Twelfth remains among the least popular of Shostakovich's symphonies due to its workmanlike nature.

== See also ==
- October (1967), symphonic poem commemorating 50th anniversary of the October Revolution
- Loyalty (1970), eight ballads commemorating the centennial of Lenin's birthday
