= Yuri Simonov =

Russian conductor (born 1941)

- Юрий Симонов
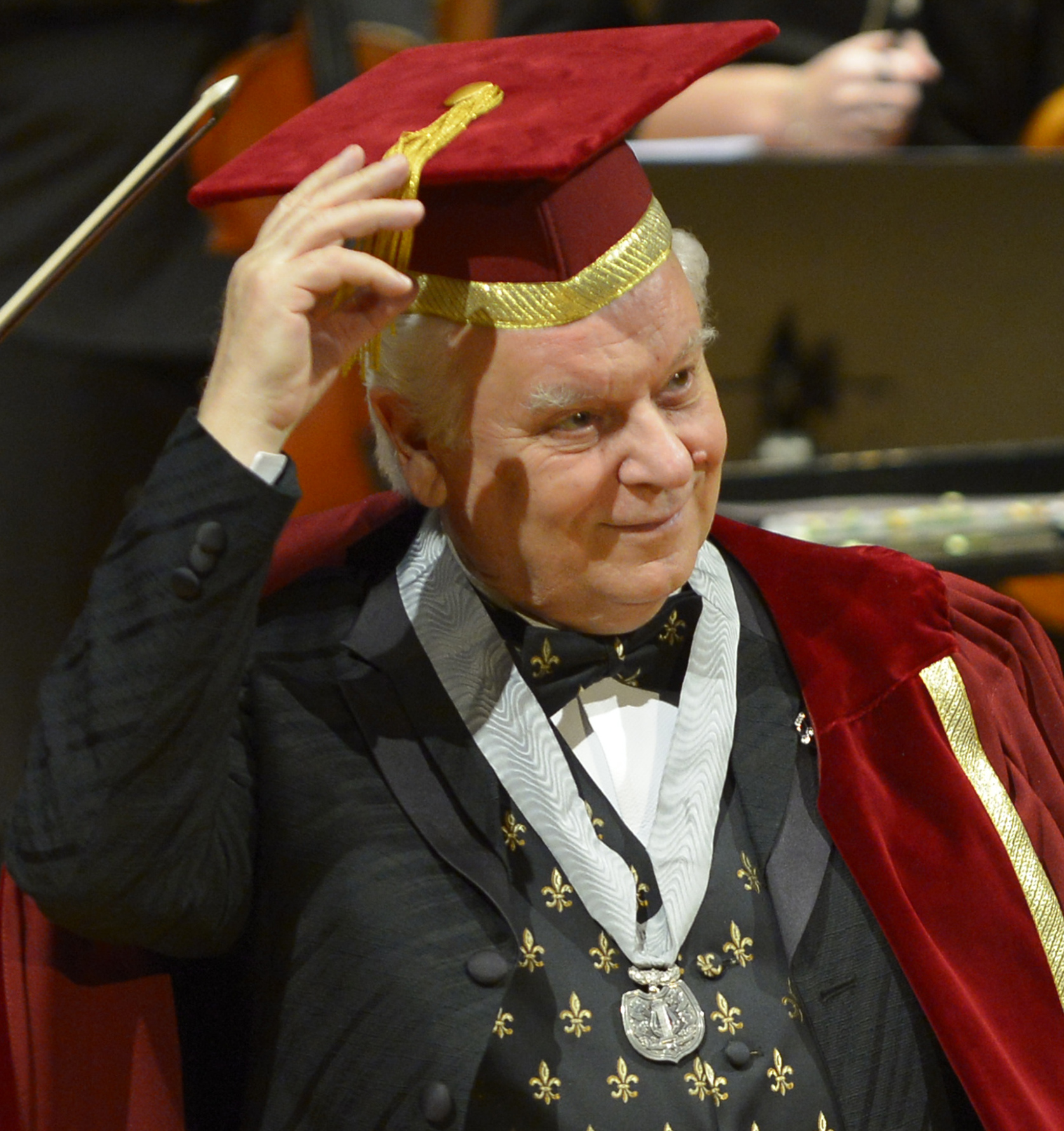
- Simonov in 2019
- Born: 4 March 1941 (age 85); Saratov, Russian SFSR, Soviet Union (now in Saratov Oblast, Russia)
- Occupation: conductor

Yuri Ivanovich Simonov (Russian: Ю́рий Ива́нович Си́монов; born 4 March 1941) is a Russian conductor. He studied at the Leningrad Conservatory under Nikolai Rabinovich, and was later an assistant conductor to Yevgeny Mravinsky with the Leningrad Philharmonic Orchestra.

Simonov first conducted at the Bolshoi Theatre in 1969, and was named chief conductor of the company in February 1970, the youngest chief conductor in the company's history at that time. He held the post until 1985. In 1986, he established the USSR Maly State Orchestra, and subsequently made several commercial recordings with the ensemble. He became music director of the Moscow Philharmonic Orchestra in 1998. Outside of Russia, Simonov was music director of the Belgian National Orchestra from 1994 to 2002.

== Selected recordings ==
- Rodion Shchedrin: ballet - Anna Karenina Bolshoi Theatre Orchestra 1980, VAI (DVD)
- Aram Khatchaturian, Ballet Suites - Royal Philharmonic Orchestra, 2000, Centurion (CD)

Cultural offices
Preceded by Gennadi Rozhdestvensky	Music Director, Bolshoi Theatre, Moscow; 1970–1985	Succeeded by Alexander Lazarev
Preceded by Mark Ermler	Music Director, Moscow Philharmonic Orchestra; 1998–present	Succeeded by incumbent
