= Nikolai Rabinovich =

Soviet conductor (1908–1972)

Nikolai Semyonovich Rabinovich (Russian: Николай Семенович Рабинович) (7 October 1908–26 July 1972) was a Soviet conductor and teacher. Rabinovich studied under Nikolai Malko and graduated from the Leningrad Conservatory in 1931, becoming a professor in 1968. He trained a series of notable conductors including Yuri Simonov, Neeme Järvi, Vladislav Chachin, Vitaliy Kutsenko, and Victor Yampolsky.

He was director of the Mikhaylovsky Theatre 1944–1948.

== Discography ==
- Legendary Conductors - Nikolai Rabinovich. Berlioz, Shostakovich, Mozart.
