= Symphony No. 2 (Shostakovich) =

1927 choral symphony by Dmitri Shostakovich

- To October
- by Dmitri Shostakovich
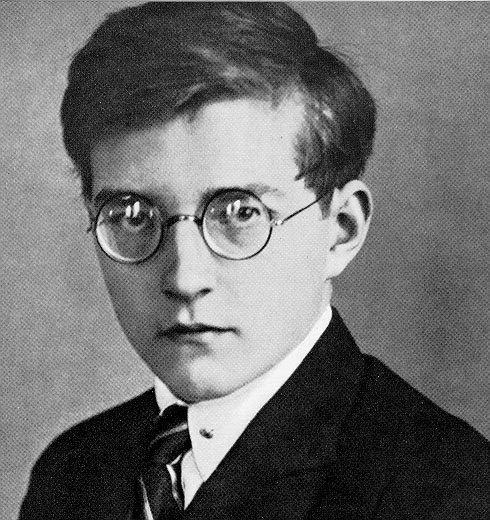
- Shostakovich in 1925
- Key: B major
- Opus: 14
- Text: To October by Alexander Bezymensky
- Language: Russian
- Composed: c. 1927
- Duration: c. 20 minutes
- Movements: 1
- Scoring: Orchestra and mixed chorus

Premiere
- Date: 5 November 1927
- Conductor: Nikolai Malko
- Performers: Leningrad Philharmonic Orchestra, Academy Capella Choir

Dmitri Shostakovich wrote his Symphony No. 2 in B major, Op. 14, subtitled To October, for the 10th anniversary of the October Revolution. It was first performed by the Leningrad Philharmonic Orchestra and the Academy Capella Choir under Nikolai Malko, on 5 November 1927. After the premiere, Shostakovich made some revisions to the score, and this final version was first played in Moscow later in 1927 under the baton of Konstantin Saradzhev. It was also the first time any version of the work had been played in Moscow.

Shostakovich later revisited the events of the October Revolution in his Twelfth Symphony, subtitled The Year 1917.

== Structure ==
The symphony is a short (about 20 minutes) experimental work in one movement; within this movement are four sections, the last of which includes a chorus. In a marked departure from his First Symphony, Shostakovich composed his Second in a gestural, geometric "music without emotional structure" manner, with the intent of reflecting speech patterns and physical movements in a neo-realistic style. This choice may have been influenced at least partially by Vsevolod Meyerhold's theory of biomechanics.

The symphony begins with a "Largo" meant to portray the primordial chaos from which order emerged, instrumental voices merge in this 13-voice polyphonic beginning, like impulses released from the void. This was considered Klangflächenmusik (cluster composition) before the term was officially coined. This is followed by a meditative episode with a tempo marking of " = 152". Shostakovich said in a letter to Boleslav Yavorsky that it depicted the "death of a child" killed on Nevsky Prospekt. The symphony concludes with a choral setting of "To October", a poem by Alexander Bezymensky praising Lenin and the October Revolution.

Shostakovich placed far more emphasis on texture in this work than he did on thematic material. He quickly adds sonorities and layers of sound in a manner akin to Abstract Expressionism instead of focusing on contrapuntal clarity. While much of the symphony consequently consists of sound effects rather than music, the work possesses an unquestionable vitality and incorporates the basic elements of the musical language he used in the rest of his career.

== Instrumentation ==
The symphony is scored for mixed choir (in the final part) and orchestra of piccolo, 2 flutes, 2 oboes, 2 clarinets, 2 bassoons, 4 horns, 3 trumpets, 3 trombones, tuba, timpani, triangle, snare drum, bass drum, cymbals, glockenspiel, (factory) siren, and strings.

== Overview ==
Shostakovich's Second and Third Symphonies have often been criticized for incongruities in their experimental orchestral sections and more conventionally agitprop choral finales. In the Soviet Union they were considered experiments, and since the days of Stalin the term "experiment" was not considered positive. Much later, Shostakovich admitted that out of his 15 symphonies, "two, I suppose, are completely unsatisfactory – that's the Second and Third." He also rejected his early experimental writing in general as "erroneous striving after originality" [the piano cycle Aphorisms] and "infants' diseases" [the Second and Third Symphonies].

The Second Symphony was commissioned to include a poem by Alexander Bezymensky, which glorified Lenin's role in the proletarian struggle. The cult of Lenin, imposed from the upper echelons of the Party, grew to gigantic proportions in the years immediately following his death. The work was initially titled "To October". It was referred to as a Symphonic Poem and Symphonic Dedication to October. It became To October, a Symphonic Dedication when the work was published in 1927. It only became known as a "symphony" considerably later.

=== Composition ===
Shostakovich was commissioned by Lev Shuglin, a Bolshevik and head of the Propaganda Department of the State Music Publishing House (Muzsektor), to write a large orchestral work with a choral finale called Dedication to October to celebrate the 10th anniversary of the October Revolution. Shuglin suggested the use of a factory whistle to open the choral finale. The composer wrote to Sergei Protopopov on 20 February 1927 that he was unsure his music could redeem the text, which he described as "repulsive".

Part of the problem Shostakovich had in writing the symphony was that people expected a successor to his First Symphony, and he no longer believed in writing in the same compositional style. He also had other projects toward which he wanted to direct his attention as soon as possible, and the First Symphony had taken him nearly a year to write. As it turned out, the Commissariat for Enlightenment's propaganda department, Agitotdel, regularly commissioned single-movement works on topical subjects. These works often featured revolutionary tunes and invariably employed sung texts to make the required meaning clear. Furthermore, because of the non-musical orientation of potential audiences, these pieces were not expected to last more than 15 or 20 minutes at most.

Though Shostakovich had been commissioned by Muzsektor rather than Agitotdel, and was thus expected to produce a composition of abstract music instead of a propaganda piece, writing a short agitprop symphony seemed to solve all of Shostakovich's problems. Such a work was entirely appropriate for the occasion for which it was being written. It would also be impossible for Muzsektor to turn it down, and was guaranteed at least some friendly press. It also sidestepped the stylistic problem of producing a sequel to the First Symphony while also opening the door to experiment with orchestral effects in an entirely new vein. Most importantly for Shostakovich, the piece took little time to compose, allowing him to return to other projects at his earliest convenience.

The choral section gave the composer particular trouble. Shostakovich told Yavorsky confidentially, "I'm composing the chorus with great difficulty. The words!!!!" Solomon Volkov said of it that "one is tempted simply to cut it off with a pair of scissors".

==== Chorus: "To October" ====
Text by Alexander Bezymensky

Russian
Мы шли, мы просили работы и хлеба,
Сердца были сжаты тисками тоски.
Заводские трубы тянулися к небу,
Как руки, бессильные сжать кулаки.
Страшно было имя наших тенет:
Молчанье, страданье, гнет.

Но громче орудий ворвались в молчанье
Слова нашей скорби, слова наших мук.
О Ленин! Ты выковал волю страданья,
Ты выковал волю мозолистых рук.
Мы поняли, Ленин, что наша судьба
Носит имя: борьба.

Борьба! Ты вела нас к последнему бою.
Борьба! Ты дала нам победу Труда.
И этой победы над гнетом и тьмою
Никто не отнимет у нас никогда.
Пусть каждый в борьбе будет молод и храбр:
Ведь имя победы – Октябрь!

Октябрь! – это солнца желанного вестник.
Октябрь! – это воля восставших веков.
Октябрь! – это труд, это радость и песня.
Октябрь! – это счастье полей и станков.
Вот знамя, вот имя живых поколений:
Октябрь, Коммуна и Ленин.

Translation
We marched, we asked for work and bread.
Our hearts were gripped in a vice of anguish.
Factory chimneys towered up towards the sky
Like hands, powerless to clench a fist.
Terrible were the names of our shackles:
Silence, suffering, oppression.

But louder than gunfire there burst into the silence
Words of our torment, words of our suffering.
Oh, Lenin! You forged freedom through suffering,
You forged freedom from our toil-hardened hands.
We knew, Lenin, that our fate
Bears a name: Struggle.

Struggle! You led us to the final battle.
Struggle! You gave us the victory of Labour.
And this victory over oppression and darkness
None can ever take away from us!
Let all in the struggle be young and bold:
The name of this victory is October!

October! The messenger of the awaited dawn.
October! The freedom of rebellious ages.
October! Labour, joy and song.
October! Happiness in the fields and at the work benches,
This is the slogan and this is the name of living generations:
October, the Commune and Lenin.

=== Reception ===
In the West, listeners appreciated the orchestral section but not the choral emotionalism that followed. While some Soviet critics acclaimed it at the time of the premiere, the Second Symphony did not attain lasting success.

== See also ==
- Symphony No. 12 "The Year 1917"
- October
- Loyalty
