= King Lear (1971 Soviet film) =

1971 film by Grigori Kozintsev

- Film poster
- Directed by: Grigori Kozintsev
- Written by: Grigori Kozintsev; William Shakespeare (play); Boris Pasternak (Russian translation, 1919)
- Starring: Jüri Järvet; Oleg Dahl; Elza Radziņa; Galina Volchek
- Cinematography: Jonas Gricius
- Edited by: Ye. Makhankova
- Music by: Dmitri Shostakovich
- Production company: Lenfilm
- Release date: 8 February 1971 (Soviet Union)
- Running time: 130 minutes
- Country: Soviet Union
- Language: Russian

King Lear (Russian: Король Лир, romanized: Korol Lir) is a 1971 Soviet drama film directed by Grigori Kozintsev, based on William Shakespeare's play King Lear. The film uses Boris Pasternak's translation of the play, while the Fool's songs are translated by Samuil Marshak. It was Kozintsev's last completed film.

== Plot ==
King Lear, in his old age, decides to divide his kingdom among his three daughters, based on how much each claims to love him. His eldest daughters, Goneril and Regan, flatter him with insincere declarations, hoping to secure the largest portions, while his youngest daughter, Cordelia, refuses to engage in flattery, asserting that her love transcends words. Enraged, Lear disowns Cordelia and banishes the loyal Kent, who defends her. Lear then divides the kingdom between Goneril and Regan, retaining a retinue of one hundred men and the title of King, and plans to live alternately with each daughter. Cordelia, meanwhile, is married to the King of France without a dowry.

Lear soon discovers the cruelty of his elder daughters, who mistreat him and strip him of his dignity, eventually casting him out during a storm. Accompanied by his fool, Lear wanders in the wilderness, where he meets a group of outcasts. Meanwhile, Gloucester’s illegitimate son, Edmund, betrays his brother Edgar and father in a bid for power, resulting in Gloucester's blinding by Regan's husband. Cordelia, learning of her father’s plight, invades with French forces to rescue him, but both are captured. Edmund orders their execution, though he is later exposed and defeated by Edgar. Edmund’s dying wish is to save Lear and Cordelia, but she is hanged before help arrives. Goneril and Regan perish in mutual betrayal, and Lear dies heartbroken over Cordelia’s death, marking a tragic end for the once-mighty king.

== Production ==
Grigori Kozintsev considered many actors for the role of Lear. The casting director first suggested Jüri Järvet for the small part of a tramp, but Kozintsev offered him the title role. He later explained: "The internal world of this actor seemed attractive to me. This is an actor of deep thought. He is able to play the role with philosophical depth. Järvet is equally strong in humour, in that particular sort of humour that sometimes touches upon grotesque". Järvet was only 50 years old by the time of filming.

The role of Goneril is portrayed by Latvian actress Elza Radziņa, who also appeared in Kozintsev's Hamlet as Gertrude. Radzina was one of the co-founders of the Sovremennik Theatre. The role of Regan went to Galina Volchek, whose casting was first met with some skepticism but went on to be a success. The relatively unknown Valentina Shendrikova of the Mayakovsky Theatre plays Cordelia. Oleg Dahl, one of the stars of the Sovremennik Theatre, was chosen to play the Fool without an audition, after a short conversation with the director. His performance received wide critical acclaim. Kozintsev also incorporated a number of experienced theatre actors from Latvia and Lithuania: Donatas Banionis as Albany, Kārlis Sebris as Gloucester, Leonhard Merzin as Edgar, and Regimantas Adomaitis as Edmund. The role of Oswald went to then-unknown Aleksei Petrenko.

The film was shot primarily in Narva and Ivangorod. Its extensive set of houses and streets was built inside the Ivangorod Fortress, which was under reconstruction at the time of filming. The film's scenic designers were Evgeny Eney and Vsevolod Ulitko; its costumes were created by the chief designer of the Bolshoi Theatre Simon Virsaladze. Dmitri Shostakovich composed the film's score.

== Cast ==
- Jüri Järvet as King Lear (voiced by Zinovy Gerdt)
- Elza Radziņa as Goneril (voiced by Nina Nikitina)
- Galina Volchek as Regan
- Valentina Shendrikova as Cordelia
- Oleg Dal as Fool
- Kārlis Sebris as Gloucester (voiced by Grigori Gay)
- Leonhard Merzin as Edgar (voiced by Emmanuil Vitorgan)
- Regimantas Adomaitis as Edmund
- Vladimir Yemelyanov as Kent
- Aleksandr Vokach as Cornwall
- Donatas Banionis as Albany (voiced by Aleksandr Demyanenko)
- Aleksei Petrenko as Oswald
- Juozas Budraitis as King of France

== Accolades ==
- Tehran International Film Festival (1972): Grand Prix (Grigori Kozintsev) and Best Actor Award (Jüri Järvet)
- Chicago International Film Festival (1972): Silver Hugo for Best Director (Grigori Kozintsev)
- Milan International Film Festival (1973): Golden Medal (Grigori Kozintsev)

== See also ==
- King Lear (Shostakovich film score)
