= Yevgeny Dolmatovsky =

Soviet-era Russian poet and lyricist (1915–1994)

- Евге́ний Аро́нович Долмато́вский
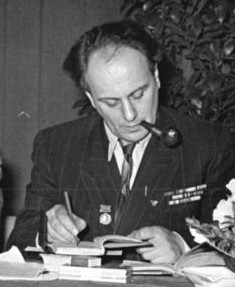
- Yevgeny Dolmatovsky in 1954
- Born: 5 May 1915; Moscow, Moscow Governorate, Russian Empire
- Died: 10 September 1994 (aged 79); Moscow, Moscow Oblast, Russia
- Resting place: Donskoye Cemetery, Moscow; 55.712144°N 37.602275°E
- Citizenship: Russian (1915-22; 1991-94); Soviet (1922-91)
- Occupations: Poet, lyricist
- Awards: Order of Lenin

Signature
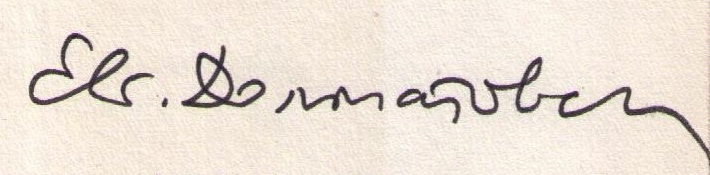

Yevgeny Aronovich Dolmatovsky (Russian: Евге́ний Аро́нович Долмато́вский; 5 May 1915 – 10 September 1994) was a Soviet-Russian poet and lyricist.

== Biography ==
He was born on 5 May 1915 in Moscow. His father Aron, who hailed from the family of a merchant of the 1st guild, was a lawyer, and after the Russian Revolution, he was a member of the Bar Association and an associate professor at the Moscow Institute of Law. His maternal grandfather, too, had belonged to the merchant class. Both families had come to Moscow from Rostov-on-Don, which lay outside the Jewish "Pale of Settlement".

The stormy Revolutionary period came as a major blow to the Dolmatovskys, and they decided to send their children to live with relatives in Rostov-on-Don. Only in 1924 did Yevgeniy finally return to Moscow.

Already as a school student, Yevgeniy published brief articles in the newspapers The Pioneer, Friendly Fellows, and The Pioneer's Pravda, which were aimed at a young readership. He was highly enthusiastic about the political changes sweeping over the country, extolling them in his sketches. In 1930, Dolmatovsky made his debut as a poet in the pages of The Pioneer's Pravda. On one occasion, he was able to show his poems to the celebrated poet Vladimir Mayakovsky, but the latter criticized them harshly, suggesting that Yevgeniy write on subjects that were truly dear to him. Yevgeniy took this advice to heart, writing poems about the glorious future and the Young Pioneer movement.

After finishing high school, Yevgeniy Dolmatovsky began to attend a pedagogical technikum, but quickly dropped out of it. Fired up with the Komsomol ideals, he went to work in the construction of the Moscow Metro.

In 1933, while still employed in this project, Dolmatovsky became a correspondence student at the Maxim Gorky Literature Institute. His first poetry collections were published shortly thereafter. In 1937, he graduated from the Institute, becoming a member of the Union of Soviet Writers that same year. He soon received an offer to travel to the Russian Far East, to set up the local branch of the Union of Writers. This trip resulted in the collection Far Eastern Verses (1939).

The Dolmatovsky family was affected by the Great Purge. In 1938, while Yevgeniy was away working in the Far East, his father Aron was arrested on false charges, and shot shortly thereafter. The family remained ignorant of his fate until 16 years later, after Joseph Stalin's death, when they were notified of Aron Dolmatovsky's posthumous rehabilitation.

Despite being the son of an "enemy of the people", Yevgeniy Dolmatovsky was included in a group of celebrated Soviet writers who were awarded the Order of the Badge of Honour in January 1939. In those years, the young poet became famous for the songs based on his lyrics. The most celebrated of these was "The Beloved City". Written in collaboration with the composer Nikita Bogoslovsky, it was performed in the cult Soviet film The Fighter Pilots. After achieving fame, Dolmatovsky was offered a job as a military correspondent, and he readily agreed. He was made a 3rd-rank supply officer and sent to the Byelorussian Military District.

While there, Dolmatovsky took part in the Red Army's invasion of Poland, which resulted in the annexation of the eastern regions of that country by the USSR and their incorporation into Ukrainian SSR and Byelorussian SSR. He later covered the events of the Soviet-Finnish Winter War (1939-40)

In August 1941, two months after the outbreak of the Soviet-German War, Dolmatovsky was captured by the Germans. This happened during the battles near Kiev, in the area of Uman, where thousands of Soviet soldiers were taken prisoner. Yevgeniy was shell-shocked and wounded in the arm. Like thousands of other Soviet prisoners of war, he was locked up in a makeshift concentration camp that had been set up in a clay pit at a brick factory. The inmates of this camp, which was nicknamed the "Uman Pit", were held in terrible conditions, and many of them died. Jews, commissars, the wounded, and the weak were shot.

Miraculously, Dolmatovsky managed to escape, and he was sheltered by a Ukrainian family, who put their own lives at risk by aiding him. As soon as he recovered from his wound, he set out for the front lines. He was rearrested, this time by an Italian patrol, and taken to a POW camp in Belaya Tserkov. Once again, he was able to escape, crossing the Dnieper River, passing through the forest, and hiding in occupied territory. In early November 1941, he crossed the front lines in the area of Voronezh. He was able to locate the editorial office of the Red Army newspaper, at which he worked.

Being an energetic man by nature, Dolmatovsky immediately wrote a poem titled "The Dnieper". It was published in frontline newspapers, set to music, and widely performed by military bands.

All this while, Dolmatovsky's colleagues at the Union of Writers believed him dead, and they even held an evening in his memory. His friend, the famous poet Konstantin Simonov, dedicated the poem "I Will Not See You Again" to him.

The time spent by Dolmatovsky in captivity, together with his two escapes, drew the attention of the NKVD (the People's Commissariat for Internal Affairs). Yevgeniy underwent a lengthy screening process, and only in January 1942 was he permitted to return to frontline duty, this time in the rank of a battalion commissar.

Dolmatovsky's most celebrated and "gut-wrenching work" is the long poem "Missing in Action" (the first part of the One Fate trilogy, 1942-1946), which reflected his own wartime experiences.

In February 1943, while he was on the Stalingrad Front, Dolmatovsky learned that Lieutenant-General Alexander Edler von Daniels was one of the German commanders who had been taken prisoner. Back in early fall 1941, von Daniels had delivered propaganda speeches to the POWs held in the "Uman Pit", who were humiliatingly forced to listen to him while seated at school desks in the pouring rain. Dolmatovsky convinced Konstantin Rokossovky, commander of the Don Front, to let him meet the captive general and remind him of the events that had transpired two years previously. The humiliating spectacle was recreated – only this time, it was von Daniels who was sitting behind the desk. In 1944, against the backdrop of tightening official control over reporting on the events of the war, Dolmatovsky was harshly criticized for alleged "distortions" in his depiction of the Red Army retreat in 1941 – which had, indeed, been utterly chaotic and uncontrollable on many occasions.

In the course of the war, Dolmatovsky wrote a great number of poems, many of which were subsequently set to music.

In May 1945, Dolmatovsky was present at the signing of the German Instrument of Surrender. His wartime decorations included the Order of the Patriotic War, 1st Class; the Order of the Red Star, and several medals.

After the end of the war, Dolmatovsky returned to Moscow, where he continued to write and publish poetry. In 1950, he was awarded the USSR State Prize, which was known as the "State Stalin Prize" at the time.

Dolmatovsky kept returning to the subjects of war and captivity. Drawing on his own experiences, Dolmatovsky wrote the book Zelyonaya Brama (1979-1989), which contained stories and sketches of combat, captivity, and escape. It also described the unjust treatment of many former POWs by the Stalinist state.

Dolmatovsky died on 10 September 1994, and was buried at the Donskoye Cemetery in Moscow.

== Partial list of compositions ==
| Year | Title (in Russian) | Transliteration | English title | Opus | Music | Notes |
|---|---|---|---|---|---|---|
| 1947 | | | Ballad of the Siberian Land | | Nikolai Kryukov | The theme song of the film, Ballad of Siberia (1948) |
| 1948 | Тоска по родине | Toska po rodine | Yearning for the Motherland | 86 | Dmitri Shostakovich | The theme song of the film, Encounter at the Elbe (1949) |
| 1949 | | | Song of the Forests: The Pioneers Plant the Forests | 81 | Dmitri Shostakovich | |
| 1951 | Родина слышит | Rodina slyshit | Four Songs on Verses: The Motherland Listens | 86 (for Voice, Wordless Chorus & Piano) | Dmitri Shostakovich | Sung by Yuri Gagarin while circling the earth as the first man in space in 1961 |
| 1963 | И на Марсе будут яблони цвести | I na Marse budut yabloni tsvesti | And On Mars There Will Be Apple Blossoms | | Vano Muradeli | A Soviet cosmonaut singing about the dream of space travel, and eventual colonisation of Mars, in which apple trees may grow. |

== See also ==
- Dmitri Shostakovich
  - Song of the Forests
  - Encounter at the Elbe
  - Loyalty
- List of Russian-language poets
