= Pieter Janssens Elinga =

Dutch Golden Age painter

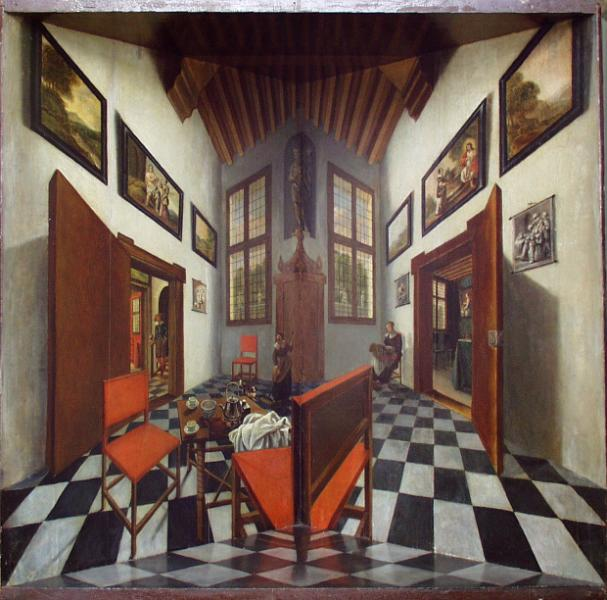
- Perspective box, Museum Bredius.
- Born: Pieter Janssens Elinga; 1623; Bruges
- Died: 1682 (aged 58–59); Amsterdam
- Known for: Painting
- Movement: Baroque

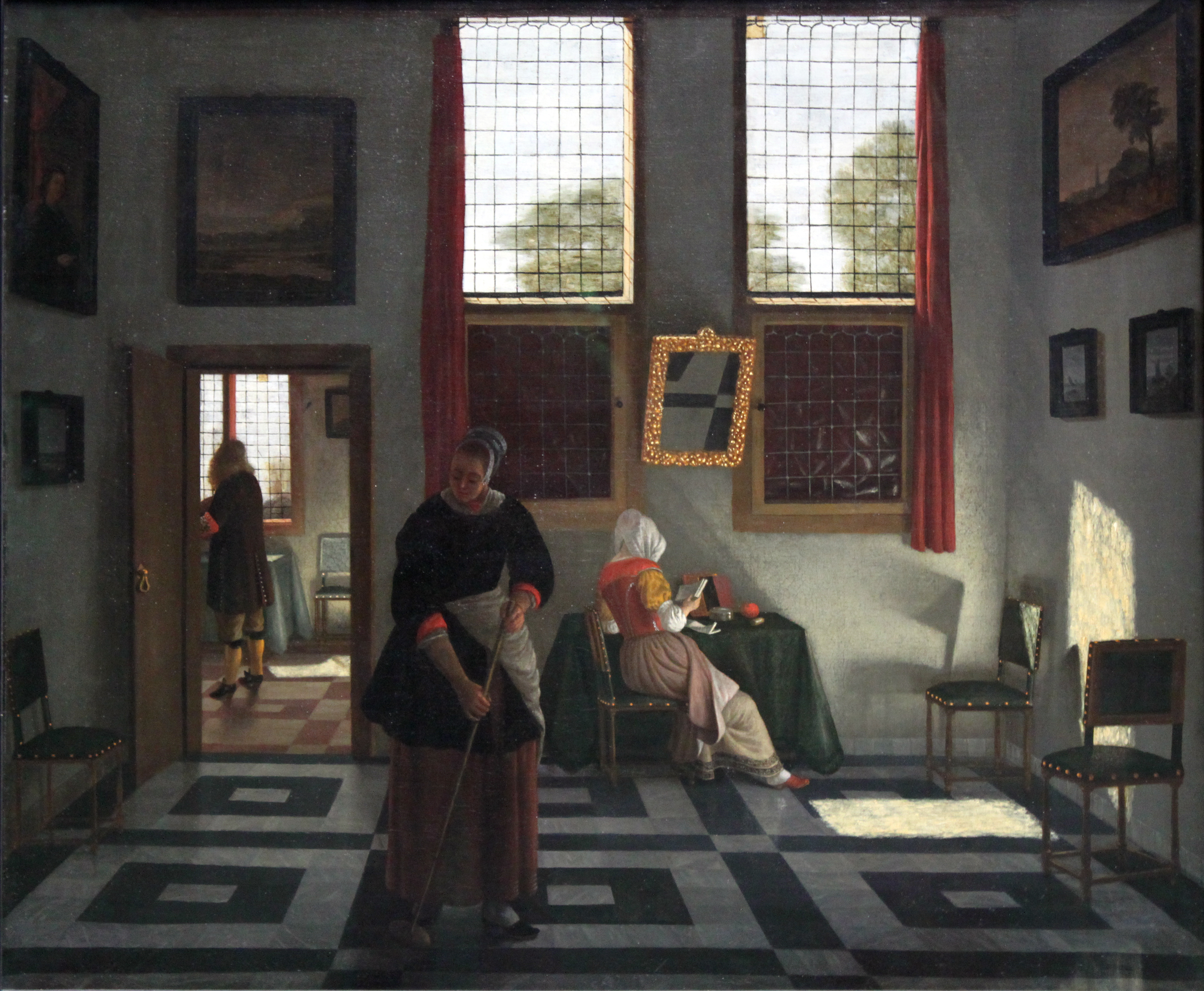
Interior with painter, reading lady and maid recurring, 1668, Städelsches Kunstinstitut

Pieter Janssens Elinga (1623–1682) was a Dutch Golden Age painter, mainly of domestic interior scenes with a strong emphasis on the rectangular geometrical elements of windows, floor tiling paintings and other elements, and a few genre paintings. He also painted still lifes, and created perspective boxes, which he became known for.

== Biography ==
He was born in Bruges as the son of Gisbrecht Janssens, who probably taught him to paint. When he moved to Rotterdam in 1653, he changed his name to Elinga. He moved to Amsterdam in 1657, where he probably died. He is last registered alive in 1657, when he paid a poll tax in Amsterdam. His widow is registered there in a notarized document as a widow in 1682. Elinga was a follower of Pieter de Hooch and Willem Kalf.

== Legacy ==
He is best known today for his perspective box, one of only 6 known to be still intact. It is on show at the Museum Bredius in The Hague. Perspective boxes were experiments with light, architectural elements, and the camera obscura. Samuel van Hoogstraten also made one, which is on show at the National Gallery.

Given the size and contorted perspective, the small painting View of Delft by Carel Fabritius has been considered to have originally been part of a perspective box.
