= Moscow Philharmonic Orchestra =

Russian symphony orchestra

The Moscow Philharmonic Orchestra is an orchestra based in Moscow, Russia. It was founded in 1951 by Samuil Samosud, as the Moscow Youth Orchestra for young and inexperienced musicians, acquiring its current name in 1953. It is most associated with longtime conductor Kiril Kondrashin under whom it premiered Shostakovich's Fourth and Thirteenth symphonies as well as other works. The Orchestra undertook a major tour of Japan with Kondrashin in April 1967 and CDs of the Japanese radio recordings have been made available on the Altus label.

The orchestra has also flourished under Yuri Simonov, the orchestra's principal conductor since 1998. In recent years it has performed in Britain, France, Germany, Slovenia, Croatia, Poland, Lithuania, and Spain, as well as Hong Kong, Japan and South Korea.

They also have collaborated with composers Igor Stravinsky, Benjamin Britten and Krzysztof Penderecki.

== Music directors ==
- Samuil Samosud (1951–1957)
- Natan Rakhlin (1957–1960)
- Kirill Kondrashin (1960–1975)
- Dmitri Kitayenko (1976–1990)
- Vassily Sinaisky (1991–1996)
- Mark Ermler (1996–1998)
- Yuri Simonov (1998–)

== Discography ==
- A to Z of Conductors: Naxos Educational 8.558087-90 Ballet, Orchestral, Choral - Sacred MYASKOVSKY: Symphonies Nos. 24 and 25 Naxos 8.555376
- Pavlova: Monolog / The Old New York Nostalgia / Sulamith (Suite) Naxos 8.557674
- Shostakovich: Symphony No. 7, "Leningrad" BIS BIS-CD-515
- Tishchenko: Symphony No. 7, Op. 119 Naxos 8.557013
- Xenakis: Dox-Orkh / Mira Fornes: Desde Tan Tien BIS BIS-CD-772

== See also ==
- Russian Philharmonic Orchestra
- National Philharmonic of Russia
