= Kirill Kondrashin =

Soviet conductor (1914–1981)

- Кирилл Кондрашин
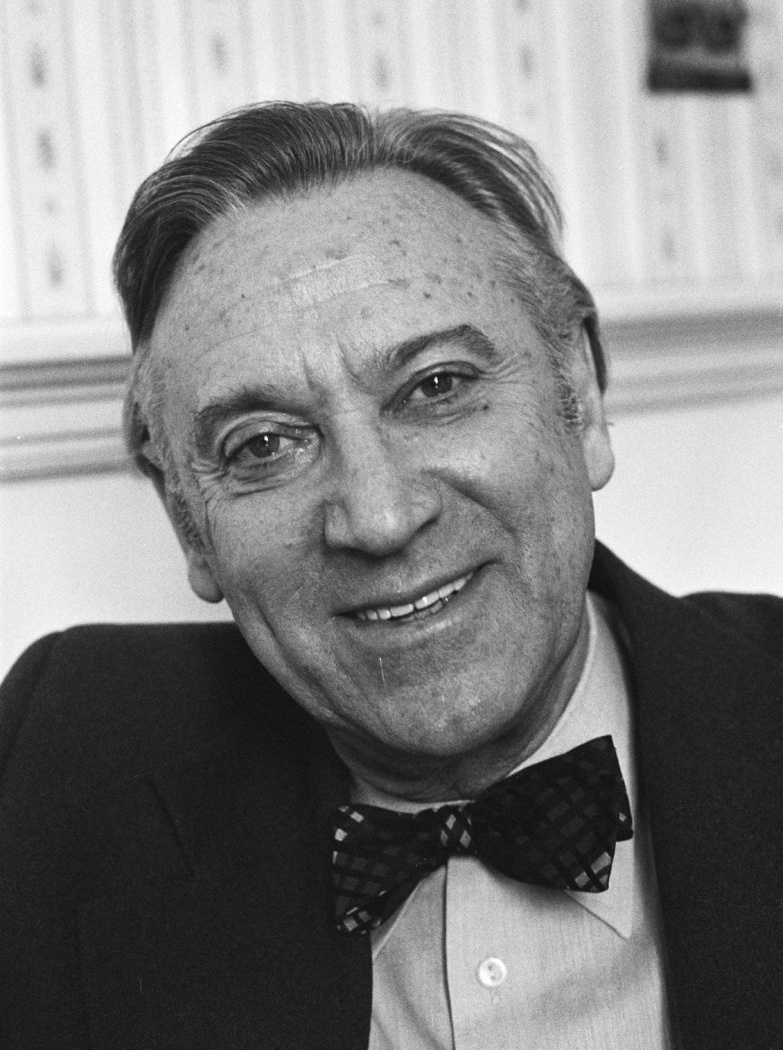
- Kirill Kondrashin in 1979
- Born: 6 March 1914; Moscow, Russian Empire
- Died: 7 March 1981 (aged 67); Amsterdam, Netherlands
- Occupations: Conductor, music pedagogue

Kirill Petrovich Kondrashin (Russian: Кирилл Петрович Кондрашин; 6 March [O.S. 21 February] 1914 – 7 March 1981) was a Soviet and Russian conductor. People's Artist of the USSR (1972).

== Early life ==
Kondrashin was born in Moscow to a family of orchestral musicians. Having spent many hours at rehearsals, he made a firm decision at the age of 14 to become a conductor. He studied at the Moscow Conservatory from 1931 to 1936 under the conductor Boris Khaikin. Kondrashin began conducting in the Young People's Theatre in Moscow in 1931, continuing in the Stanislavsky and Nemirovich-Danchenko Moscow Academic Music Theatre three years later. He conducted at the Maly Opera Theatre in Leningrad from 1938 to 1942 and the Bolshoi Theatre in Moscow from 1943. His performance of Shostakovich's Symphony No.1 attracted the composer's attention and led to the formation of a firm friendship. In 1948, he was awarded the Stalin Prize.

== Career ==
In the first International Tchaikovsky Competition in 1958, Kondrashin was the conductor for American pianist Van Cliburn, who won the first prize. Following the competition, he toured the United States with Cliburn, being the first Soviet conductor to visit America since the beginning of the Cold War. They performed and recorded the Rachmaninoff Piano Concerto No.3 and Tchaikovsky Piano Concerto No.1, which they had played in the competition. Millions of the recordings were sold in America. And their Tchaikovsky recording for RCA Victor was the first classical LP to sell one million copies. Later, in 1972, a concert performance of Brahms's Piano Concerto No. 2 reunited Cliburn and Kondrashin with the Moscow Philharmonic in Moscow; RCA Victor eventually released the recorded performance in 1994, along with a studio recording of Rachmaninoff's Rhapsody on a Theme of Paganini, on compact disc. Kondrashin was also the artistic director of the Moscow Philharmonic Orchestra from 1960 to 1975. During this period he conducted the premiere of Shostakovich's Symphony No.4 in December 1961 and No.13 the following year. He conducted several performances in Europe and America with other famous Russian musicians such as Rostropovich, Oistrakh, and Richter.

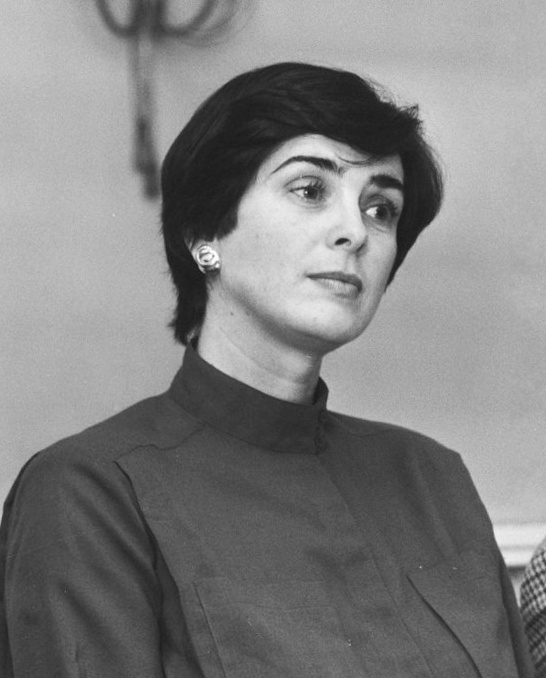
Nolda Broekstra in 1983

== Exile to Western Europe ==
Kondrashin defected from the Soviet Union in December 1978 while touring in the Netherlands and sought political asylum there, whereupon the Soviet regime immediately banned all his previous recordings. He took the post of Permanent Guest Conductor of Amsterdam's Concertgebouw Orchestra in 1978 and remained in that position until his death. He also established a brief but fruitful collaboration with the Vienna Philharmonic.

In the Netherlands, he married his assistant and interpreter, musicologist Nolda Broekstra (born 1944). When they first met around 1975, Broekstra was 30 years old and spoke no Russian. Both were married and were not fluent in English, the language they spoke with each other. Yet they fell in love, tried to be together when they could, and exchanged letters. Broekstra diligently started studying Russian and English and quickly mastered both languages. Their family life in the Netherlands was short, as Kondrashin died in Amsterdam from a heart attack in early 1981, on the same day he conducted Mahler's First Symphony with the North German Radio Symphony Orchestra. Philips Records issued recordings of some of Kondrashin's live concerts with the Concertgebouw Orchestra on LP and CD, including energetic performances of symphonies by Shostakovich. On the recording of Shostakovich's sixth symphony Kondrashin can be heard tapping or even pounding his foot as he conducts the lively final movement. In 1971, he publicly supported the American communist activist Angela Davis.

== Awards and honors ==
- Stalin Prize, first class (1948) – for conducting opera The Power of the Fiend by Serov on the Bolshoi stage
- Stalin Prize, second class (1949) – for conducting opera The Bartered Bride by Smetana
- Honored Artist of the RSFSR (1951)
- Grammy Award (1960)
- People's Artist of the RSFSR (1965)
- Glinka State Prize of the RSFSR (1969) – Concert (1966–1967) and (1967–1968)
- People's Artist of the USSR (1972)
- Order of the October Revolution (1974)
- Order of the Red Banner of Labour
- Order of Friendship of Peoples (1976)

== Legacy ==
The Kirill Kondrashin Concours (Kirill Kondrashin Competition) for young conductors was held every five years from 1984 to 2008.

Cultural offices
Preceded by Samuil Samosud	Music Directors, Moscow Philharmonic Orchestra; 1960–1975	Succeeded by Dmitri Kitaenko
