= Theodore Kuchar =

American and Ukrainian conductor (born 1960)

- Теодор Кухар
- Born: May 31, 1963 (age 63); New York City, US
- Occupations: Conductor, violist

Theodore Kuchar (Note: Ukrainian: Теодор Кухар, romanized: Teodor Kukhar) (born May 31, 1963) is an American and Ukrainian conductor and violist.

== Biography ==
Kuchar was born in 1963 in New York City. He started to learn to play the violin at ten years of age, later switching to viola. He graduated from the Cleveland Institute of Music, where his viola instructor was Robert Vernon, in 1982.

In 1980, he was awarded a Paul Fromm Fellowship from the Boston Symphony Orchestra to study at Tanglewood Music Center. He was the principal violist of orchestras in Cleveland, Helsinki, and Cape Town.

In 1987 he became music director of the Queensland Philharmonic Orchestra in Australia, a post that he held until 1993. Between 1990 and 2006, he served as the first artistic director of the Australian Festival of Chamber Music in Townsville; a Theodore Kuchar Scholarship for Excellence in Music was established there after his departure. He was also music director of the West Australian Ballet in Perth until 1993.

In 1992 Kuchar was appointed Principal Guest Conductor of the Ukrainian State Symphony Orchestra, which changed its name to National Symphony Orchestra of Ukraine in 1994. In that year he became artistic director and Principal Conductor of the Orchestra. After his contract with the Orchestra ended in 2000, he was awarded the title of Conductor Laureate for Life. Under Kuchar's direction, the National Symphony Orchestra of Ukraine became the most frequently recorded orchestra of the former Soviet Union, with over 60 compact discs under Naxos Records and its Marco Polo label. Theodore Kuchar's complete discography is numbered over 100 with over 90 records under Naxos Records.

Between 1996 and 2006, he was music director and conductor of the Boulder Philharmonic Orchestra. He founded the Sinfonia of Colorado, a chamber ensemble, in 1997; it was disbanded in 2002. He was also professor and director of orchestral studies at the College of Music of the University of Colorado at Boulder between 1996 and 2001. From 2002 to 2016 he was music director and conductor of the Fresno Philharmonic Orchestra. From 2003 to 2018 he was music director and conductor of the Reno Chamber Orchestra., where from 2005 to 2018 he was artistic director of the Nevada Chamber Music Festival.

His current positions include:

- Principal Conductor of the Lviv National Philharmonic Orchestra of Ukraine since 2022.
- Resident Conductor at the Kent/Blossom Music Festival since 2004.
- Chief Conductor of the Janáček Philharmonic Orchestra from 2005 to 2012.
- Artistic Director of the Venezuela Symphony Orchestra since 2011.
- Professor of Orchestral Conducting at Houghton University since 2022.
- Principal Conductor of the National Philharmonic Orchestra of Ukraine since 2025

== Selected discography ==
- Borys Lyatoshynsky. Symphonies Nos. 2 and 3. Ukrainian State Symphony Orchestra; Theodore Kuchar, conductor. Naxos/Marco Polo, 1994. The Australian Broadcasting Corporation gave the record an award for "Best International Recording of the Year" in 1994.
- Sergei Prokofiev. Cinderella Suites Nos. 1-3, Scythian Suite "On the Dnieper". Ukrainian State Symphony Orchestra; Theodore Kuchar, conductor. Naxos, 1994.
- Vasily Kalinnikov. Symphonies Nos. 1 and 2. National Symphony Orchestra of Ukraine; Theodore Kuchar, conductor. Naxos, 1995.
- Sergei Prokofiev. Symphonies Nos. 3 and 7. National Symphony Orchestra of Ukraine; Theodore Kuchar, conductor. Naxos, 1995.
- Sergei Prokofiev. Symphony No. 5; The Year 1941 (Symphonic Suite). National Symphony Orchestra of Ukraine; Theodore Kuchar, conductor. Naxos, 1995.
- Sergei Prokofiev. Symphony No. 6, Op. 111; Waltzes, Op. 110. National Symphony Orchestra of Ukraine; Theodore Kuchar, conductor. Naxos, 1995.
- Sergei Prokofiev. Symphonies No. 1 "Classical"; No. 2; Dreams, Op. 6; Autumnal Sketch, Op. 8. National Symphony Orchestra of Ukraine; Theodore Kuchar, conductor. Naxos, 1996.
- Benjamin Lees. Symphony No. 4 "Memorial Candles." Kimball Wheeler, mezzo-soprano; James Buswell, violin; National Symphony Orchestra of Ukraine; Theodore Kuchar, conductor. Naxos, 1998.
- Walter Piston. Violin Concertos Nos. 1 and 2; Fantasia for Violin and Orchestra. James Buswell, violin; National Symphony Orchestra of Ukraine; Theodore Kuchar, conductor. Naxos, 1998. This was named a "Record of the Year" for 1999 by Gramophone in January 2000.
- Sergei Prokofiev. Symphony No. 4, Op. 112; The Prodigal Son (Suite). National Symphony Orchestra of Ukraine; Theodore Kuchar, conductor. Naxos, 1999.
- George Antheil. Symphony No. 4, Symphony No. 6, McKonkey's Ferry. National Symphony Orchestra of Ukraine; Theodore Kuchar, conductor. Naxos, 2000.
- Paul Creston. Symphonies Nos. 1–3. National Symphony Orchestra of Ukraine; Theodore Kuchar, conductor. Naxos, 2000.
- Morton Gould. American Ballads; Foster Gallery; American Salute. National Symphony Orchestra of Ukraine; Theodore Kuchar, conductor. Naxos, 2000.
- Richard Toensing. Flute Concertos; Of Angels and Shepherds. For the flute concertos: Leone Buyse, flute; National Symphony of Ukraine; Theodore Kuchar, conductor. CRI, 2001.
- Roy Harris. Symphonies Nos. 7 and 9. National Symphony Orchestra of Ukraine; Theodore Kuchar, conductor. Naxos, 2002.
- Modest Mussorgsky. Pictures at an Exhibition; Night on the Bare Mountain. National Symphony Orchestra of Ukraine; Theodore Kuchar, conductor. Naxos, 2003.
- George Whitefield Chadwick. Symphony No. 2; Symphonic Sketches. National Symphony Orchestra of Ukraine; Theodore Kuchar, conductor. Naxos, 2005.
- Dmitri Shostakovich. Jazz & Ballet Suites • Film Music . National Symphony Orchestra of Ukraine; Theodore Kuchar, conductor. Brilliant Classics, 2005.
- Bedřich Smetana. Má Vlast; Complete Orchestral Works. Janáček Philharmonic Orchestra; Theodore Kuchar, conductor. Brilliant Classics, 2007.
