= Symphony No. 7 (Piston) =

The Symphony No. 7 by Walter Piston is a symphony dating from 1960.

== History ==
Piston's Seventh Symphony was commissioned by the Philadelphia Orchestra Association, and was premiered by that orchestra, conducted by Eugene Ormandy, on February 10, 1961. The symphony was awarded a Pulitzer Prize in 1961, which was the second time for Piston—his first was in 1948 for his Third Symphony. It bears some resemblance to Piston's Three New England Sketches, composed in 1959, and for this reason as well as for parallels of structure has been compared to Beethoven's Pastorale Symphony.

== Analysis ==
The work is in three movements:

1. Con moto
2. Adagio pastorale
3. Allegro festevole

When Piston was composing his Seventh Symphony, he took into account the particular sonic character of the Philadelphia Orchestra's rich string timbres, as well as the acoustics of the Philadelphia Academy of Music where it was to be premiered.

The first movement begins with a large, soaring theme, featuring a propulsive rhythm in fast triple meter. The minor mode, forceful rhythms, and cumulative contrapuntal density in both the exposition and recapitulation lend this movement a vehemently passionate character. The second movement, Adagio pastorale, similarly is dominated by serious but not solemn broad melodies. The finale, as in Piston's other symphonies, is sunny and brilliant, including a passage of syncopated wind melodies accompanied by pianissimo percussion, and pizzicato strings, which recalls the scherzo of Piston's Sixth Symphony.
