= String Quartet No. 4 (Piston) =

String Quartet No. 4 by Walter Piston is a chamber-music work composed in 1951. Piston's fourth string quartet was commissioned by the Coolidge Foundation in celebration of the centennial of Mills College, and is dedicated to Elizabeth Sprague Coolidge. It was premiered on May 18, 1952, by the Hungarian Quartet. It is closely related to Piston's Fourth Symphony.

== Analysis ==
The quartet is in four movements:

1. Soave
2. Adagio (9/8)
3. Leggero vivace (2/4)
4. Con fuoco (6/8)

The first movement is a sonata-allegro in D major, whose harmonies are pandiatonic rather than triadic. The second theme is given in the high register of the viola, with the other instruments softly accompanying sulla tastiera (near the fingerboard).

The slow movement features the cello in a pensive cantilena, and a shifting, unstable harmony that settles on E minor only at the end.

The third movement is a fugal scherzo with a fleetness comparable to Mendelssohn and a dense chromaticism that recalls Schoenberg. Its exaggerated staccato and duple meter resemble the scherzos of the Flute Quintet and the Sixth Symphony, respectively, while the pizzicato A minor chords at the opening and close recall the scherzo movements of the string quartets by Debussy and Ravel.

The finale is in sonata-allegro form like the opening movement, but with an expressionist tone. The first theme is dramatic, marked by contrasting textures, sharp dissonances, crescendos starting forte, irregular downbeats, and abrupt rests. The second theme is a grotesque march. The urgent character of this movement is similar to Piston's finales from the early 1940s, and this may be because it, too, was written in wartime—the Korean War in the present instance.

== Discography ==
- 1984. Walter Piston: String Quartet No. 3; String Quartet No. 4. Portland String Quartet. Sounds of New England. LP recording. Northeastern Records NR 214. Boston, Massachusetts: Northeastern Records. Fourth Quartet reissued as part of Walter Piston: String Quartet No. 4; String Quartet No. 5; Quintet for Flute and Strings. Doriot Anthony Dwyer, flute; Portland String Quartet (Stephen Kecskemethy and Ronald Lanz, violins; Julia Adams, viola; Paul Ross, cello). Sounds of New England. CD recording. Northeastern NR 9002-CD. Boston, Massachusetts: Northeastern Records, 1988.
