= Symphony No. 5 (Piston) =

The Symphony No. 5 by Walter Piston was composed in 1954.

Piston's Fifth Symphony was commissioned by the Juilliard School of Music on the occasion of their 50th anniversary. It was completed in 1954, but premiered only on February 24, 1956, by the Juilliard Orchestra, conducted by Jean Paul Morel. The program also included premieres of works by Peter Mennin, Lukas Foss, Milton Babbitt, Irving Fine, Ross Lee Finney, and William Schuman.

== Analysis ==
The work is in three movements:

1. Lento – Allegro con spirito
2. Adagio
3. Allegro lieto

A typical performance will last around 21 minutes.

The first movement is in sonata-allegro form, with an introductory Lento, which returns at the end in varied form as a coda.

The slow movement begins with a twelve-tone row, the intervals of which are related to motives from the first movement. The main theme of the Adagio is also related to the intervals of this row, but is more diatonic in construction. The movement is in variation form, but the variations are continuous rather than sectional, and are begun in succession by the clarinet, divisi strings, and tuba.

The finale is a rondo, and is the most diatonic of the three movements. As is usual with Pistonian finales, it is drivingly rhythmic. The impression of a strong "American" sound is produced in this movement by a spaciousness of melodies and textures. The main theme, in C major, spans more than two octaves in jagged fourths, and the secondary theme is marked by jaunty syncopations. These jazz-like figures are indebted to up-tempo Broadway cabaret songs. Piston's treatment of them is at the same time witty and dated.

The three movements do not form as satisfactory a symphonic whole as is found in the Fourth and Sixth Symphonies.
