= Ivan Nikitin =

Ivan Nikitin (Russian: Иван Никитин) may refer to:

- Ivan Nikitin (painter) (c. 1690 – 1741), Russian painter of portraits and battle paintings
- Ivan Nikitin (poet) (1824-1861), Russian poet
