= Serenata for Orchestra (Piston) =

Walter Piston's Serenata for Orchestra is an orchestral suite or miniature symphony written in 1956. Piston composed the Serenata in 1956, on commission for the Louisville Orchestra. It is dedicated to conductor Robert Whitney, who led the work's premiere on October 25, 1956.

== Analysis ==
The work is in three movements.

1. Con allegrezza
2. Con sentimento
3. Con spirito

The outer movements of the Serenata are in D major, and the overall form resembles a miniature symphony lasting only 12 minutes. This, the title, and certain melodic gestures make this composition more Mozartean than any of Piston's neoclassical works from the 1930s, though it remains further from 18th-century styles than neoclassical works of Poulenc, Prokofiev, or Stravinsky.

The first movement is reminiscent of the Ballando ("dancing") movement of Piston's Fourth Symphony. The middle movement is dominated by a long-lined tune, and the work closes with a high-spirited, strutting finale. Tonal emphasis in the finale on the tonic minor, subdominant, and minor dominant lend an ambiguity to the D-major conclusion that is characteristic for Piston.

== Discography ==
- Walter Piston: Serenata for Orchestra; David Van Vactor: Fantasia, Chaconne, and Allegro; Niels Viggo Bentzon: Pezzi sinfonici; Louisville Orchestra; Robert Whitney, cond. LP recording. Louisville Orchestra First Edition Records LOU-586. Louisville, Kentucky, 1958.
- Walter Piston: Symphony No. 4; Capriccio for Harp and String Orchestra; Serenata for Orchestra; Three New England Sketches. Therese Elder Wunrow, harp; Seattle Symphony; Gerard Schwarz. CD recording. Delos DE 3106. Hollywood, California: Delos International, 1991.
