= Symphony No. 5 (Prokofiev) =

- by Sergei Prokofiev
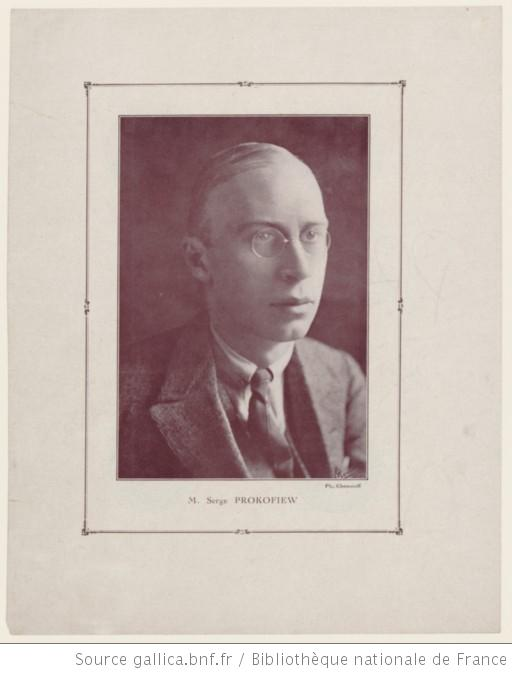
- Prokofiev, photographed in 1936 by Pierre Choumoff
- Key: B♭ major
- Opus: 100
- Composed: 1944
- Duration: 40 min
- Movements: Four

Premiere
- Date: January 13, 1945
- Location: Moscow Conservatory
- Conductor: Prokofiev
- Performers: USSR State Symphony Orchestra

Sergei Prokofiev wrote his Symphony No. 5 in B♭ major, Op. 100, in the Soviet Union in one month in the summer of 1944.

== Background ==
From 1925 onward, Prokofiev’s status as a composer grew, with his 1942 Piano Sonata No. 7 receiving the Stalin Prize (Second Class). Prior to composing his Fifth Symphony, Prokofiev relocated to Moscow as a result of his increasing reliance on financial support from the Soviet Union and their threat of revoking their contributions.

The creation of the Fifth Symphony can be traced to musical ideas explored during the composition of Prokofiev's earlier work, particularly the Symphony No. 4 in C major composed fourteen years prior. Prokofiev incorporated these musical motifs into a piano score over less than a month during his stay at The Composers' House in Ivanovo, under the background of the Soviet Union’s involvement in World War II.

He gave out in a statement at the time of the work's premiere that he intended it as "a hymn to free and happy Man, to his mighty powers, his pure and noble spirit." He added, "I cannot say that I deliberately chose this theme. It was born in me and clamoured for expression. The music matured within me. It filled my soul."

== Movements ==
External audio
- Performed by the Berlin Philharmonic under Seiji Ozawa
- I. Andante
- II. Allegro marcato
- III. Adagio
- IV. Allegro giocoso

The piece is in four movements, lasting 40–45 minutes:

1. Andante (in B♭ major)
2. Allegro marcato (in D minor)
3. Adagio (in F major)
4. Allegro giocoso (in B♭ major)

=== I. Andante ===
The first movement is in a tightly argued sonata form: its exposition presents two themes, one calm and sustained, the other soaring with tremolo accompaniment from strings, which are then involved in an elaborate and climactic development section. The movement is wrapped up with an electrifying coda punctuated by a roaring tam-tam and low piano tremolos.

1st theme, mm. 1–7
mm. 8–10
mm. 29–30
2nd theme, mm. 54–64
mm. 74–77
Closing theme, mm. 83–86

=== II. Allegro marcato ===
The second movement is an insistent scherzo in Prokofiev's typical toccata mode, framing a central theme in triple time.

mm. 3–10
mm. 56–58
mm. 112–115
mm. 120–127
mm. 154–157

=== III. Adagio ===
The third movement is a dreamy slow movement, full of nostalgia, which nevertheless builds up to a tortured climax before receding to a quiet end.

mm. 4–8
mm. 55–62
mm. 82–84
"tortured climax" mm. 125–131

=== IV. Allegro giocoso ===
The finale starts with a brief introduction consisting of a fragmented melody in the woodwinds, followed by a cello choir recalling the first theme of the first movement. This is interrupted by the violas, launching into the movement proper, a rondo. The playful ("giocoso") main theme is contrasted with two calmer episodes, one introduced by the flute, the other a chorale in the strings. Just as the movement is striving to end with a victorious tone, the music degenerates into a frenzy (rehearsal mark 111), which is stripped down to solo strings playing staccato "wrong notes" (rehearsal mark 113) with rude interjections from low trumpets, making the ultimate orchestral unison on B♭ sound all the more ironic.

mm. 3–6
Theme from first movement, mm. 15–22
mm. 29–36
mm. 37–38
mm. 54–55
mm. 83–90
mm. 164–172

== Instrumentation ==
The work is scored for the following:

Woodwinds

Piccolo
2 Flutes
2 Oboes
Cor anglais
E♭ clarinet
2 Clarinets
Bass clarinet
2 Bassoons
Contrabassoon

Brass

4 Horns
3 Trumpets
3 Trombones
Tuba

Percussion

Timpani
Bass drum
Snare drum
Cymbals
Triangle
Tambourine
Tam-tam
Wood block

Keyboards

Piano

Strings

Harp

Violins (1st and 2nd)
Violas
Cellos
Double basses

== Premiere ==
The symphony was premiered on January 13, 1945, in the Great Hall of Moscow Conservatory by the USSR State Symphony Orchestra, conducted by Prokofiev himself.

As he took the stage, artillery fired. He paused until it finished. This left a great impression upon the audience, who upon leaving the Great Hall learned the gunfire marked the Red Army's crossing of the Vistula into Germany. The premiere was very well received, and the symphony has remained one of the composer's most popular works.

Then, in November of that year, Serge Koussevitzky and the Boston Symphony Orchestra introduced the score to America and recorded it in Boston's Symphony Hall on February 6 and 7, 1946, for RCA Victor, using an optical sound film process introduced by RCA in 1941; it was initially issued on 78-rpm discs and later on LP and CD. The symphony's rapid insertion into the repertoire was alluded to by Dennis Dobson in his review of the 1951 Edinburgh Festival for Music Survey, where he panned the work as "noisy, uncouth" and a "falling off in maturity" from works such as Chout and the Piano Concerto No. 3 and went on to say, "that this work is well thought of and much played in both America and the Soviet Union speaks sociological and cultural volumes".

== Notable recordings ==
Orchestra	Conductor	Record company	Year of recording	Format
Philharmonic Symphony Orchestra of New York	Artur Rodziński	Columbia Records	1946	LP/CD
Boston Symphony Orchestra	Sergei Koussevitzky	RCA, Dutton	1946	LP/CD
Philadelphia Orchestra	Eugene Ormandy	Columbia	1958	LP
USSR Radio Symphony Orchestra	Leopold Stokowski	Pristine Audio	1958	CD
Cleveland Orchestra	George Szell	Sony	1959	CD
Boston Symphony Orchestra	Erich Leinsdorf	Testament	1963	CD
Leningrad Philharmonic Orchestra	Evgeny Mravinsky	Russian Disc, Leningrad Masters	1968	CD
Leningrad Philharmonic Orchestra	Gennadi Rozhdestvensky	BBC	1971	CD
Berlin Philharmonic	Herbert von Karajan	DG	1977	CD
Bavarian Radio Symphony Orchestra	Klaus Tennstedt	Profil	1977	CD
Orchestre National de France	Mstislav Rostropovich	Erato	1988	CD
Berlin Philharmonic	Seiji Ozawa	Presto CD	1990	CD
National Symphony Orchestra of Ukraine	Theodore Kuchar	Naxos	1995	CD
Russian National Orchestra	Vladimir Jurowski	PentaTone	2007	SACD
Cincinnati Symphony Orchestra	Paavo Järvi	Chandos	2008	CD
São Paulo State Symphony Orchestra	Marin Alsop	Naxos	2012	CD
Finnish Radio Symphony Orchestra	Sakari Oramo	Ondine	2012	CD
Mariinsky Orchestra	Valery Gergiev	Mariinsky	2012	SACD
Bergen Philharmonic Orchestra	Andrew Litton	BIS	2015	CD
Deutsches Symphonie-Orchester Berlin	Tugan Sokhiev	Sony	2016	CD
Royal Concertgebouw Orchestra	Mariss Jansons	RCO	2016	SACD
Netherlands Radio Philharmonic	James Gaffigan	Challenge	2017	SACD
Oslo Philharmonic	Vasily Petrenko	LAWO	2018	CD
Cleveland Orchestra	Franz Welser-Möst	Cleveland Orchestra	2021	download
