= Viktor Kalinnikov =

Russian composer

Viktor Sergeevich Kalinnikov, also Victor (Russian: Ви́ктор Серге́евич Кали́нников; 2 March [O.S. 18 February] 1870 – 23 February 1927), was a Soviet choral composer, conductor and pedagogue. He was the younger brother of the better-known symphonic composer Vasily Kalinnikov (1866–1901).

He studied at the seminary in Oryol, then at the Moscow Philharmonic School, taking oboe and music theory. He played in various theatre orchestras, and taught singing at schools in Moscow. From 1899 to 1901 he headed the orchestra of the Moscow Art Theatre. Victor attended then taught at the Moscow Synodal School of Russian Orthodox Church music, where he composed 24 sacred choral settings for the Russian Orthodox All-Night Vigil and Divine Liturgy. From 1922 to 1926 he taught at the Moscow Conservatory. His compositions were popular and well received by critics. He died in Saltykovka, a suburb of Balashikha near Moscow.

== Selected works ==
Genre	Date	English title	Russian title (original title)	Scoring	Notes
Orchestral		Concert Overture	Концертная увертюра	for orchestra	
Chamber music	1896	2 Miniatures	Две миниатюры	for 2 violins, viola and cello with double bass ad libitum	
Choral		The Gentle Stars Shone upon Us	Нам звёзды кроткие сияли	for mixed chorus a cappella	words by Aleksey Pleshcheyev
Choral		Upon an Ancient Burial Mound	На старом кургане	for mixed chorus a cappella	words by Ivan Savvich Nikitin
Choral		Down the Mother-Volga River	Вниз по матушке по Волге	for men's chorus a cappella	arrangement of a Russian brigand song
Choral		Elegy	Элегия	for mixed chorus a cappella	words by Alexander Pushkin
Choral		Forest	Лес	for mixed chorus a cappella	words by Aleksey Koltsov
Choral		The Lark	Жаворонок	for mixed chorus a cappella	words by Vasily Zhukovsky
Choral		Autumn	Осень	for mixed chorus a cappella	words by Alexander Pushkin
Choral		The Sun, the Sun Rises	Солнце, солнце встаёт	for mixed chorus a cappella	words by Alexander Fyodorov – Александр Митрофанович Фёдоров (1868–1949)
Choral		The Stars Fade Away	Звезды меркнут	for mixed chorus a cappella	words by Ivan Savvich Nikitin
Choral		Oh, Is This Honourable for a Young Lad	Ой, честь ли то молодцу	for mixed chorus a cappella	words by A. K. Tolstoy
Choral			Ходит Спесь надуваючись	for mixed chorus a cappella	words by A. K. Tolstoy
Choral		At the Order Gate	У приказных ворот	for mixed chorus a cappella	words by A. K. Tolstoy
Choral		Winter	Зима	for mixed chorus a cappella	words by Yevgeny Baratynsky
Choral		Condor	Кондор	for mixed chorus a cappella	words by Ivan Bunin
Choral		Morning Dawn	Утром зорька	for mixed chorus a cappella	words by Stepan Skitalets
Choral		Summer Passes	Проходит лето	for mixed chorus a cappella	words by Nikolay Afanasyevich Sokolov – Николай Афанасьевич Соколов (18??–1926)
Choral: sacred		Cherubic Hymn (No. 1)	Херувимская песнь	for mixed chorus a cappella	Sacred opus 1
Choral: sacred		We Hymn Thee (No. 1)	Тебе поем	for mixed chorus a cappella	Sacred opus 2
Choral: sacred		It Is Truly Fitting (No. 1)	Достойно есть	for mixed chorus a cappella	Sacred opus 3
Choral: sacred		In Thy Kingdom	Во Царствии Твоем	for mixed chorus a cappella	Sacred opus 4; published 1905?
Choral: sacred		O Lord, Save / Trisagion	Господи, спаси... / Трисвятое	for mixed chorus a cappella	Sacred opus 5
Choral: sacred		A Mercy of Peace	Милость мира	for mixed chorus a cappella	Sacred opus 6
Choral: sacred		We Hymn Thee (No. 2)	Тебе поем	for mixed chorus a cappella	Sacred opus 7
Choral: sacred		Our Father	Отче наш	for mixed chorus a cappella	Sacred opus 8
Choral: sacred		It Is Truly Fitting (No. 2)	Достойно есть	for mixed chorus a cappella	Sacred opus 9
Choral: sacred		Glory, Now and Ever / Only Begotten Son	Слава и ныне / Единородный Сыне	for mixed chorus a cappella	Sacred opus 10
Choral: sacred		Come, Let Us Worship	Приидите поклонимся	for mixed chorus a cappella	Sacred opus 11
Choral: sacred		I Believe (The Creed)	Верую (Символ веры)	for mixed chorus a cappella	Sacred opus 12
Choral: sacred		Bless the Lord, O My Soul	Благослови, душе моя, Господа (на Литургии)	for mixed chorus a cappella	Sacred opus 13; at liturgy
Choral: sacred		Where Can I Go from Thy Spirit?	Камо пойду от Духа Твоего	for mixed chorus a cappella	Sacred opus 14; in place of the communion hymn at liturgy
Choral: sacred		Praise the Name of the Lord	Хвалите имя Господне	for mixed chorus a cappella	Sacred opus 15
Choral: sacred		Gladsome Light (Gentle Light)	Свете тихий	for mixed chorus a cappella	Sacred opus 16; text from the office of vespers
Choral: sacred		Rejoice, O Virgin	Богородице Дево	for mixed chorus a cappella	Sacred opus 17
Choral: sacred		From My Youth	От юности моея	for mixed chorus a cappella	Sacred opus 18
Choral: sacred		Having Beheld the Resurrection of Christ	Воскресение Христово видевше	for mixed chorus a cappella	Sacred opus 19
Choral: sacred		Lord, Now Lettest Thou	Ныне отпущаеши	for mixed chorus a cappella	Sacred opus 20
Choral: sacred		Cherubic Hymn (No. 2)	Херувимская песнь	for mixed chorus a cappella	Sacred opus 21
Choral: sacred		Blessed Is the Man	Блажен муж	for mixed chorus a cappella	Sacred opus 22
Choral: sacred		My Soul Magnifies the Lord	Величит душа моя, Господа	for mixed chorus a cappella	Sacred opus 23
Choral: sacred		Bless the Lord, O My Soul	Благослови, душе моя, Господа (на Всенощной)	for mixed chorus a cappella	Sacred opus 24; at vigil
Choral: sacred		O Lord, Save / Holy God	Господи, спаси... / Святый Боже		
