= List of compositions by George Whitefield Chadwick =

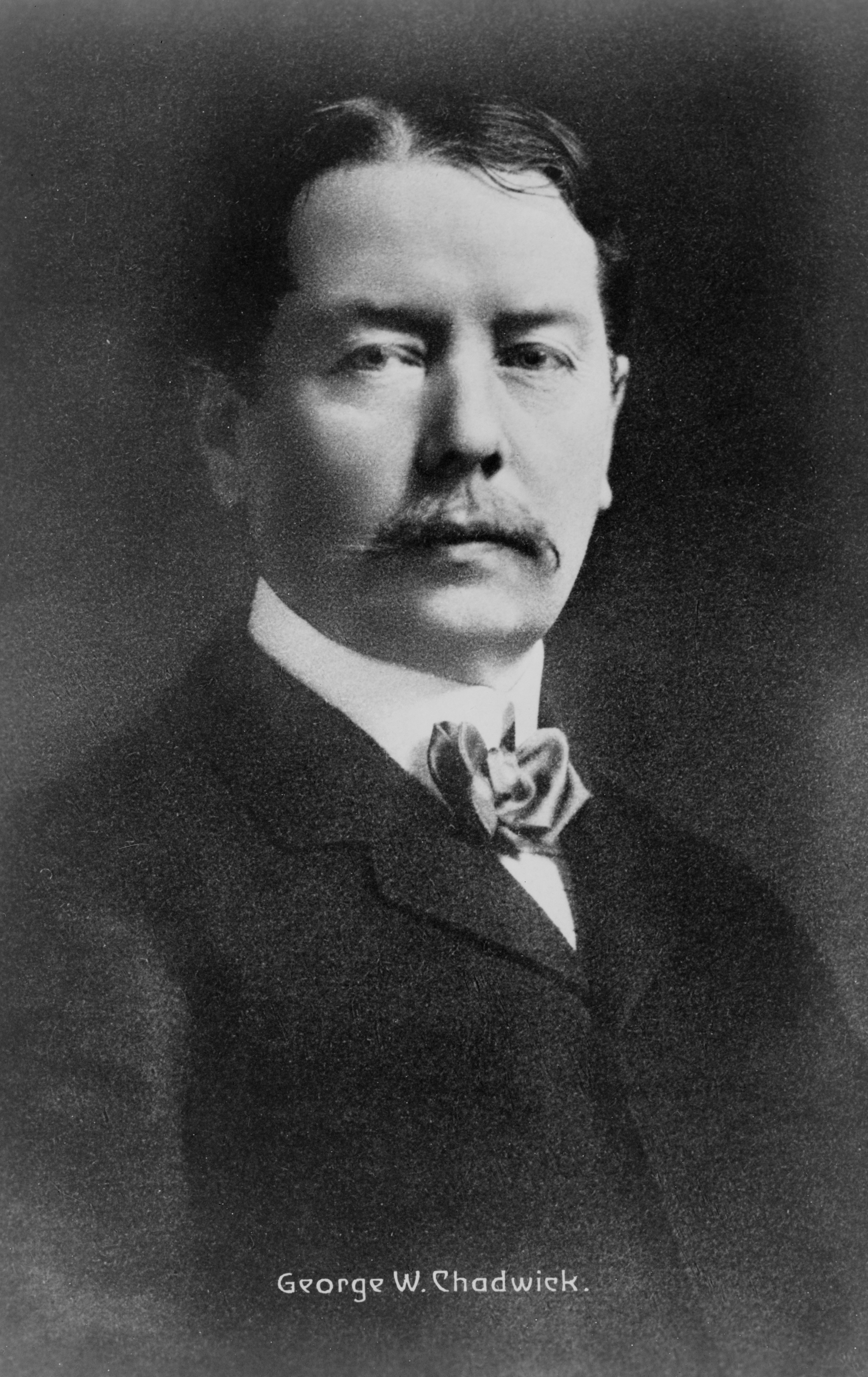
George W. Chadwick

This is a list of compositions by George Whitefield Chadwick (1854–1931).

== Stage ==
- The Peer and the Pauper (comic operetta, 2, R. Grant), 1884, unperformed
- A Quiet Lodging (operetta, 2, A. Bates), Boston, April 1, 1892
- Tabasco (burlesque op, 2, R.A. Barnet), 1893–4, Boston, Tremont, January 29, 1894 (includes material from The Peer and The Pauper)
- Judith (lyric drama, 3, W.C. Langdon, after scenario by Chadwick), concert performance, Worcester, Massachusetts, September 23, 1901
- Everywoman (incid music, W. Browne), New York, Herald Square, 1911
- The Padrone (tragic op, 2, D. Stevens, after scenario by Chadwick), 1912, unperformed
- Love’s Sacrifice (pastoral op, 1, Stevens), 1916–17, Chicago, February 1, 1923

== Choir and orchestra ==
- Dedication Ode (H.B. Carpenter), S, A, T, B, SATB, orchestra, 1883
- Noël (Boston, 1888)
- Lovely Rosabelle (W. Scott), S, T, SATB, orchestra, 1889
- The Pilgrims (F.D. Hemans), SATB, orchestra, 1890
- Phoenix expirans (cant., Lat. hymn), S, A, T, B, SATB, orchestra, 1891
- Ode for the Opening of the Chicago World’s Fair (H. Monroe), S, T, SATB, wind ens, orchestra, 1892
- The Lily Nymph (Bates), S, T, B, B, SATB, orchestra, 1894–5
- Ecce jam noctis (J.G. Parker, after St Gregory), male vv, org, orchestra, 1897
- Noël (various texts), pastoral, solo vv, SATB, orchestra, 1907–8
- 37 anthems, including Art Thou Weary
- 19 choruses, male vv
- 20 choruses, female vv

== Instrumental ==
=== Symphonies ===
- Symphony No. 1 in C, 1881
- Symphony No. 2 in B♭, 1883–5
- Symphony No. 3 in F, 1893–4

=== Symphonic Poems ===
- Cleopatra, symphonic poem, 1904
- Aphrodite, symphonic fantasy, 1910–11
- Tam O’Shanter, symphonic ballad, 1914–15
- Angel of Death, symphonic poem, 1917–18

=== Overtures ===
- Rip Van Winkle, overture, 1879
- Thalia, overture, 1882
- The Miller’s Daughter, overture, 1886
- Melpomene, dramatic overture, 1887
- Adonais, overture, 1899
- Euterpe, overture, 1903
- Anniversary Overture, ?1922

=== Other orchestral works ===
- Pastorale Prelude, 1890
- Serenade for strings in F, 1890
- Tabasco March for band or orchestra, 1894
- Symphonic Sketches, Suite, A, 1895–1904
- Sinfonietta in D, 1904
- Suite symphonique in E♭, 1905–9
- Elegy, 1920
- 3 Pezzi, 1923

=== Concertante works ===
- Theme, Variations and Fugue, for organ and orchestra, 1908

=== Chamber ===
- String Quartet No. 1, g, 1877?
- String Quartet No. 2, C, 1878
- String Quartet No. 3, D, 1885
- Piano Quintet, E♭, 1887
- String Quartet No. 4, e, 1896
- String Quartet No. 5, d, 1898
- 30 piano pieces
- 8 organ pieces

== Songs ==
=== Solo voice and orchestra ===
- Lochinvar (W. Scott), Bar, orchestra, 1896
- A Ballad of Trees and the Master (S. Lanier), low/medium v, orchestra, 1899, also version for voice and piano
- Aghadoe (ballad, J. Todhunter), A, orchestra, 1910
- The Curfew (H. Longfellow), low/medium v, orchestra, 1914?
- The Voice of Philomel (D. Stevens), 1914?
- The Fighting Men (M.A. DeWolfe Howe) (1918)
- Joshua (humorous song, R.D. Ware), 1919?
- Drake’s Drum (H. Newbolt), low/medium v, orchestra, 1920?

=== Solo voice and piano ===
- 128 songs incl. 6 Songs, op.14 (Boston, 1885) [incl. The Danza (A. Bates)]
- 3 Ballads (Boston, 1889)
- Bedouin Love Song (B. Taylor) (Boston, 1890)
- 12 Songs of Brittany (Bates), arr. and harmonized (Boston, 1890)
- A Flower Cycle (Bates), 12 songs (Boston, 1892)
- 12 Lyrics from Told in the Gate (Boston, Bates) (1897)
- 4 Irish Songs (Boston, 1910)
- 5 Songs (Stevens) (New York, 1914)
- 3 Nautical Songs (Ware, H. Newbolt, A. Conan Doyle) (Boston, 1920)
