= Symphony No. 3 (Prokofiev) =

Symphony by Sergei Prokofiev

- by Sergei Prokofiev
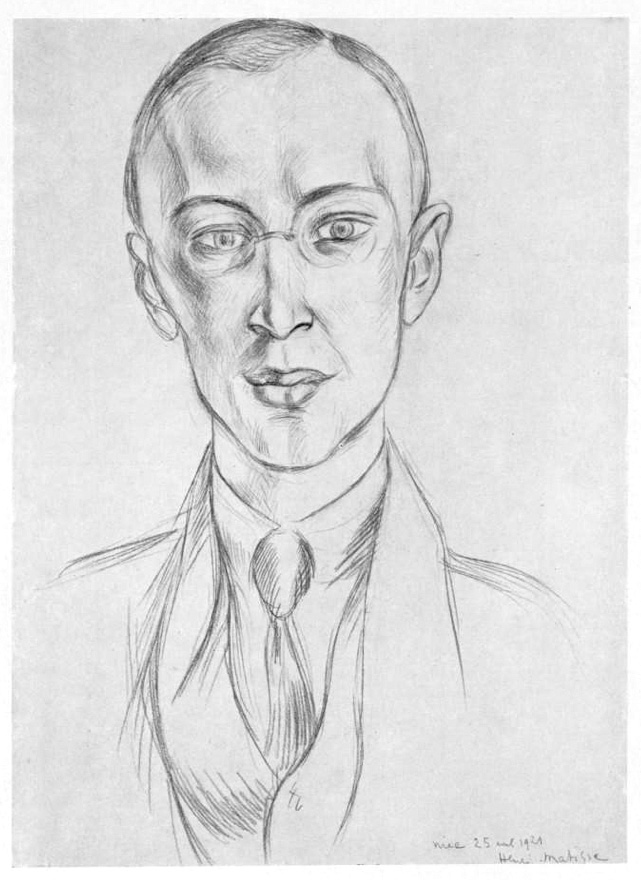
- Prokofiev, 1921 drawing by Henri Matisse
- Key: C minor
- Opus: 44
- Based on: The Fiery Angel
- Composed: 1928
- Dedication: Nikolai Myaskovsky
- Movements: Four

Premiere
- Date: 17 May 1929
- Conductor: Pierre Monteux
- Performers: Orchestre Symphonique de Paris

Sergei Prokofiev wrote his Symphony No. 3 in C minor, Op. 44, in 1928.

== Background ==
The music derives from Prokofiev's opera The Fiery Angel, a touching love story set against the backdrop of demonic possession. This opera had been accepted for performance in the 1927–28 season at the Berlin State Opera by Bruno Walter, but this production never materialised; in fact, the opera was never staged in Prokofiev's lifetime. Prokofiev, who had been working on the opera for years, was reluctant to let the music languish unperformed, and after hearing a concert performance of its second act given by Serge Koussevitzky in June 1928, he adapted parts of the opera to make his third symphony (shortly afterwards, he drew on his ballet The Prodigal Son for his Symphony No. 4 in similar fashion). The symphony, which was dedicated to Nikolai Myaskovsky was premiered on 17 May 1929 by Pierre Monteux conducting the Orchestre Symphonique de Paris.

== Movements ==
External audio
- Performed by the Berlin Philharmonic under Seiji Ozawa
- I. Moderato
- II. Andante
- III. Allegro agitato
- IV. Andante mosso

The symphony is in four movements, lasting around 30–35 minutes:

1. Moderato
2. Andante
3. Allegro agitato — Allegretto
4. Andante mosso — Allegro moderato

Though the music of the symphony is based on that of the opera, the material is developed symphonically; the symphony is therefore absolute rather than programmatic.

The first movement "is built on the leitmotivs of the opera's heroine and heor Renata and Ruprecht". It is in traditional sonata form, and opens with clashing chords played by the whole orchestra, along with tolling bells, setting a mood of threat and unrest. An impassioned first theme enters on strings, while a melancholy second theme on bassoons and lower strings provides contrast. The climactic development section follows, finding space for a third theme, which eventually combines with the first two themes. After a grave climax with gigantic orchestral chords and a last "struggle" in marching rhythms, the ethereal recapitulation ensues, in which the first and second themes are integrated, although much reduced and played softer, as if only the shadow of what was before remains.

The second movement, a meditative andante with a ternary structure, displays Prokofiev's talent in creating fragile, gossamer textures. The central section is more brooding in nature, with the theme consisting of semitones. It uses "themes from the introduction to Act V and the scene with Faust".

In the third movement, "based on Renata's evocation of the spirit" there are hybrid elements from both of the movements that preceded it: though the textures are lighter than in the first movement, the sense of foreboding is back, as dithering strings create a chilling effect. They are intensified by insistent announcements from the brass choir and bass drum.

Finally, in the fourth movement, Prokofiev reprises musical materials from earlier in the symphony, beginning at a comfortable andante pace and gradually accelerating. The themes of the opening movement are threaded into the narrative before the Third comes to rest on a fearsome juggernaut of violent chords. This movement may be interpreted as "a portrait of the philosopher and sorcerer Agrippa von Nettesheim".

== Instrumentation ==
The work is scored for the following:

Woodwinds

Piccolo
2 Flutes
2 Oboes
Cor anglais
2 Clarinets
Bass clarinet
2 Bassoons
Contrabassoon

Brass

4 Horns
3 Trumpets
3 Trombones
Tuba

Percussion

Timpani
Bass drum
Snare drum
Cymbals
Tambourine
Tam-tam
Castanets
Bell

Strings

2 Harps

Violins (1st and 2nd)
Violas
Cellos
Double basses

== Recordings ==
Orchestra	Conductor	Record Company	Year of Recording	Format
French National Orchestra	Charles Bruck	His Master's Voice	1956	LP
Utah Symphony Orchestra	Maurice Abravanel	Vanguard	1964	LP/CD
Boston Symphony Orchestra	Erich Leinsdorf	RCA (LP); Testament (CD)	1966	LP/CD
London Symphony Orchestra	Claudio Abbado	Decca	1969	LP/CD
USSR Ministry of Culture State Symphony Orchestra	Gennady Rozhdestvensky	Melodiya	1969	LP/CD
French National Orchestra	Jean Martinon	Vox Records	1971	LP/CD
Royal Concertgebouw Orchestra	Kirill Kondrashin	Philips	1975 (live recording)	CD
London Philharmonic Orchestra	Walter Weller	Decca	1977	LP/CD
Czech Philharmonic Orchestra	Zdeněk Košler	Supraphon	1982	LP/CD
Junge Deutsche Philharmonie	Riccardo Chailly	Deutsche Grammophon	1984	LP
Moscow Philharmonic Symphony Orchestra	Dmitri Kitaenko	Melodiya	1985	LP/CD
Scottish National Orchestra	Neeme Järvi	Chandos	1985	LP/CD
Orchestre National de France	Mstislav Rostropovich	Erato	1986	LP/CD
Berlin Philharmonic Orchestra	Seiji Ozawa	Deutsche Grammophon	1990	CD
Royal Concertgebouw Orchestra	Riccardo Chailly	Decca	1991	CD
Philadelphia Orchestra	Riccardo Muti	Philips	1991	CD
National Symphony Orchestra of Ukraine	Theodore Kuchar	Naxos	1994	CD
London Symphony Orchestra	Valery Gergiev	Philips	2004 (live recording)	CD
Gürzenich-Orchester Köln	Dmitri Kitajenko	Phoenix Edition	2005 (live recording)	CD
Bournemouth Symphony Orchestra	Kirill Karabits	Onyx Records	2013	CD
São Paulo State Symphony Orchestra	Marin Alsop	Naxos	2014	CD
Netherlands Radio Philharmonic Orchestra	James Gaffigan	Northstar Recordings	2015	SACD
Bergen Philharmonic Orchestra	Andrew Litton	BIS Records	2020	SACD
London Symphony Orchestra	Gianandrea Noseda	LSO Live	2023	SACD
