= Symphony No. 1 (Piston) =

The Symphony No. 1 by Walter Piston was completed in 1937. By the time Piston finished his first symphony, he was 43 years old. It was premiered on April 8, 1938, by the Boston Symphony Orchestra conducted by the composer.

== Structure ==
Like most of Piston's symphonies, the work is in three movements:

1. Andantino quasi adagio – Allegro (4/4)
2. Adagio (6/8)
3. Allegro con fuoco (2/2)

As with the much later Symphony No. 8, twelve-tone technique is incorporated into a broader palette of compositional elements. The first movement begins with a rare example, for Piston, of an ostinato, presented in the pizzicato basses. This ostinato consists of nine of the twelve chromatic notes, and the remaining three are found in the theme played above it. The mood is somber and poignant. Despite the chromatic saturation, this movement (as well as the finale) is in the tonality of C. This slow introduction is followed by a vigorous sonata-allegro movement with a main theme based on the ostinato figure.

The ostinato also returns at the end of the movement, and its chromatic nature helps make a transition to the tritone-related key of F♯ for the second movement, whose thematic material is also derived from the ostinato. The finale is in rondo form, with the main theme once again taken from the beginning of that ostinato, only in inversion.
