= Symphony No. 4 (Prokofiev) =

Symphony by Sergei Prokofiev

- by Sergei Prokofiev
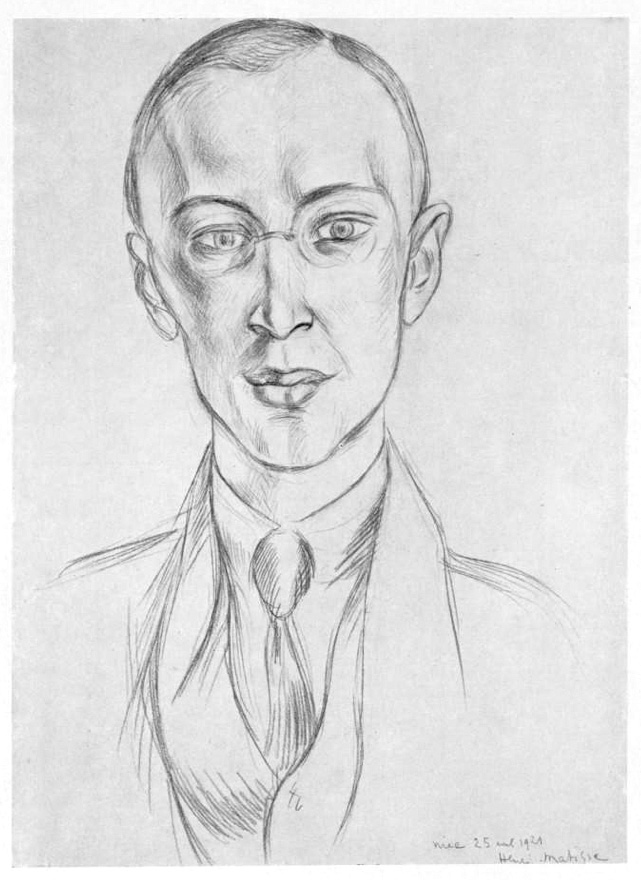
- Prokofiev, 1921 drawing by Henri Matisse
- Key: C major
- Opus: 47; 112
- Based on: The Prodigal Son
- Composed: 1930; 1947
- Duration: 22 mins.; 37 mins.
- Movements: Four

Premiere
- Date: November 14, 1930
- Conductor: Serge Koussevitzky
- Performers: Boston Symphony Orchestra

Sergei Prokofiev's Symphony No. 4 is actually two works, both using material created for The Prodigal Son ballet. The first, Op. 47, was completed in 1930 and premiered that November; it lasts about 22 minutes. The second, Op. 112, is too different to be termed a "revision"; made in 1947, it is about 37 minutes long, differs stylistically from the earlier work, reflecting a new context, and differs formally as well in its grander instrumentation.

== Symphony No. 4, Op. 47 ==
=== Context and genesis ===
As a concert pianist, Prokofiev travelled worldwide, and toured the United States during the 1925-26 season. In early 1927, he went on a two-month concert tour of the Soviet Union. He planned to return in 1928, but those plans fell through. In 1929, another planned Soviet tour was cancelled, this time because of a hand injury Prokofiev suffered in a car accident.

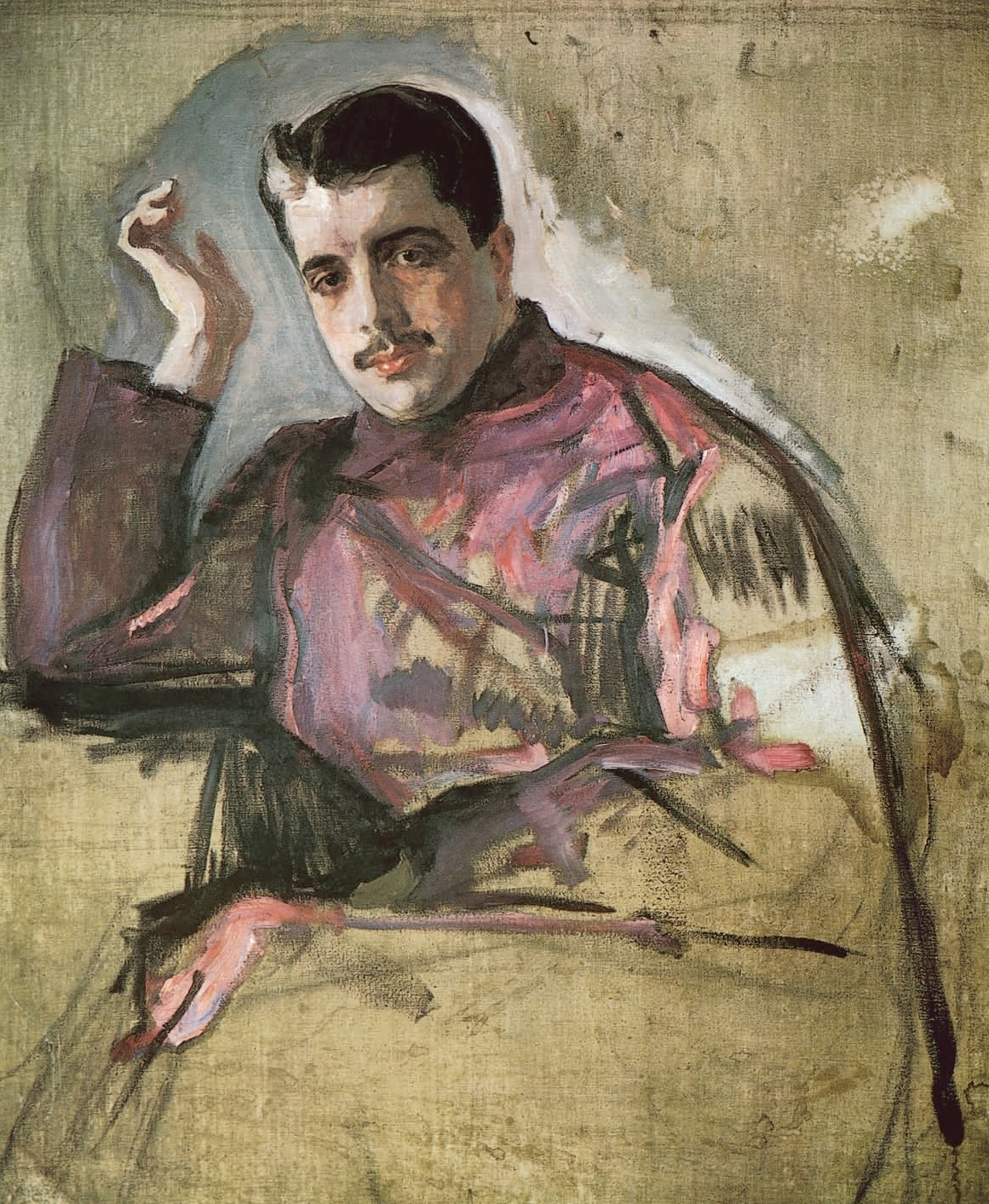
Sergei Diaghilev, in a 1909 portrait by Valentin Aleksandrovich Serov

Throughout this time as a touring virtuoso, Prokofiev also continued to compose. Symphony No. 2 in D minor premiered in Paris under the baton of Serge Koussevitzky in the summer of 1925, to tepid critical response. At the same time, Sergei Diaghilev, the ballet impresario, suggested that Prokofiev write a ballet on a Soviet subject. The resulting piece was Le pas d'acier (The Steel Step), Prokofiev's third ballet for Diaghilev, which premiered in Paris in the summer of 1927. He had also been working on an opera entitled The Fiery Angel, of which several premieres had been cancelled. He decided to salvage some of the material from the opera, and turned it into his Symphony No. 3 in C minor. In late 1928, with the aforementioned Soviet tour cancelled, Prokofiev decided to accept another ballet commission from Diaghilev. This piece, rather than being on futurist themes like Le pas d'acier, was based on a Biblical story: L'enfant Prodigue (Parable of the Prodigal Son from the Bible). The moralistic, Biblical subject matter was not an anomaly; such subjects were popular in the Parisian ballet scene in the late 1920s.

As Prokofiev was composing The Prodigal Son in early 1929, he found that many of the themes he was creating would work better in a more developmental symphonic context, rather than the more episodic layout of a ballet. So, he began composing a new symphony, alongside the ballet. The two works share much of the same material, although one does not specifically borrow from the other: they were composed mostly concurrently. The ballet, The Prodigal Son, premiered in Paris in the summer of 1929, to great critical acclaim. It would be the last collaboration between Diaghilev and Prokofiev, because Diaghilev died just months later, in August.

The symphony that resulted, Symphony No. 4, Op. 47, began from material originally written for the ballet's fourth number. Prokofiev expanded the material into a sonata form, and the resulting music is the first movement of Symphony No. 4. The rest of the symphony draws on material that appears in the ballet, or that Diaghilev rejected as not fitting his vision for the ballet.

Koussevitzky had been discussing a commission for the fiftieth anniversary of the Boston Symphony Orchestra with Prokofiev in 1929. Prokofiev's response was the Symphony No. 4. However, because the commission fee was lower than Prokofiev was willing to accept, Prokofiev only allowed the Boston Symphony to purchase the manuscript of the work, rather than commission it. This meant that Prokofiev received less money, and the Boston Symphony did not get the prestige of a commission. Prokofiev worked on the symphony on the long train rides he had to take during a tour of the United States in early 1930. However, because of disagreements with Koussevitzky, he returned to Paris in March, before the symphony's premiere in Boston in November.

=== Instrumentation ===
Woodwinds

piccolo
2 flutes
2 oboes
English horn
2 clarinets in B♭ and A
bass clarinet
2 bassoons
contrabassoon

Brass

4 horns in F
2 trumpets in C
3 trombones
tuba

Percussion

timpani
bass drum
snare drum
cymbals
suspended cymbal

Strings

violins (1st and 2nd)
violas
cellos
double basses

=== Analysis ===
==== I. Andante assai – Allegro eroico ====
Symphony No. 4, Op. 47, 1st movement
Ex. 2 (shows the "machine music", found in Allegro eroico)

The first movement is in sonata form, beginning with an introduction and ending with a Coda. The introduction, exposition, development, recapitulation, and Coda are clearly distinguished by different tempo markings and time signatures. Though the movement begins and ends in C major the tonal center is ambiguous as it is constantly shifting.

The opening of the movement begins with a slow, newly composed introduction, a warm melody played by the woodwinds (ex.1). This melody also appears in the second movement.

This introduction then leads to the main section, marked allegro eroico. The vigorous, hard-edged theme is taken from the fourth number of the ballet. The excitement of the music is created by the constant 16th-note rhythm played by strings (ex.2). This "machine music" ostinato provides an important part of the texture. The second subject is a lyrical counter-theme, marked Piu tranquillo, introduced by the flute. Following the principles of tripartite first-movement form, the earlier material is developed, and then returns in a varied recapitulation.

==== II. Andante tranquillo ====
Symphony No. 4, Op. 47, 2nd movement
Ex. 3 (is an important part of the 2nd movement)

The second movement is in C major, based on the final episode of the ballet. The serene, glowing theme contains the most memorable melody in the work. Prokofiev exalts the moment with the simplest of the flute melodies (ex.3), blending itself with the strings.

The form of this movement is ABCB^{1}A^{1}DXA^{2}, with A being the glowing melody and X a reminiscence of the symphony's introduction. The BCB^{1} component can be considered a ternary episode. B suggests a sonata transition, while the C material arrives with the weight of a sonata second subject. In a purported sonata allegro scheme, the B^{1} section would inaugurate the development, given its more active texture and return to the main key of C. The A theme is developed next, with canonic imitations in E♭ major, after which surface the mysterious B-major chords of section D. These two sections (D and X) shatter the proposed sonata scheme, and in place of a recapitulation, the movement closes with another reprise of the lyrical A theme.

==== III. Moderato, quasi allegretto ====
The form of this movement is Scherzo and Trio. This elegant and spirited movement is the only movement that Prokofiev borrowed completely from the ballet, including the third number as the main body, and the fifth as the ending. The music of the ballet's third number proceeds up to the last four bars, when it switches to a reprise of the ballet's fifth number.

At the Scherzo, Prokofiev indulges in new delicacies of orchestration, giving a sinuous dance theme to the strings (ex.4), and decorating it on its return. The angular unisons framing the Trio section benefit from a touch of counterpoint in the trumpet and horn parts, and the ballet dance's form lends itself perfectly to a classically proportioned scherzo.

==== IV. Allegro risoluto ====
The fourth movement draws on material from numbers 1, 2, 5, and 9 of the ballet, and is in sonata form. The first theme (in C major) is formed of a combination of the toccata-like opening of the ballet's first number with the lyrical melody from the ballet's second number. These elements are altered both as a unit and as separate elements throughout the movement. The transition to the second theme consists of a quick sequence of variations on the lyrical portion of the first theme, modulating quite a distance (to G♭ major at one point). The second subject is newly composed for the symphony, and is a minor third away, in A major.

The development consists primarily of a large section from the ballet's fifth number, dominated by horns and tuba. The toccata-like material from the first theme is also subjected to heavy development. The recapitulation is prefaced by a jarring statement of the theme from the fifth number in B♭ major, followed by a blaring diminished-seventh fanfare. The recapitulation begins with the newly composed second theme, and transitions to the Coda through some variations of the fanfare motive from the end of the development. The coda consists of a push and pull between C major and C minor, with the major key winning, based largely on material from the ballet's ninth number.

=== Early reception ===
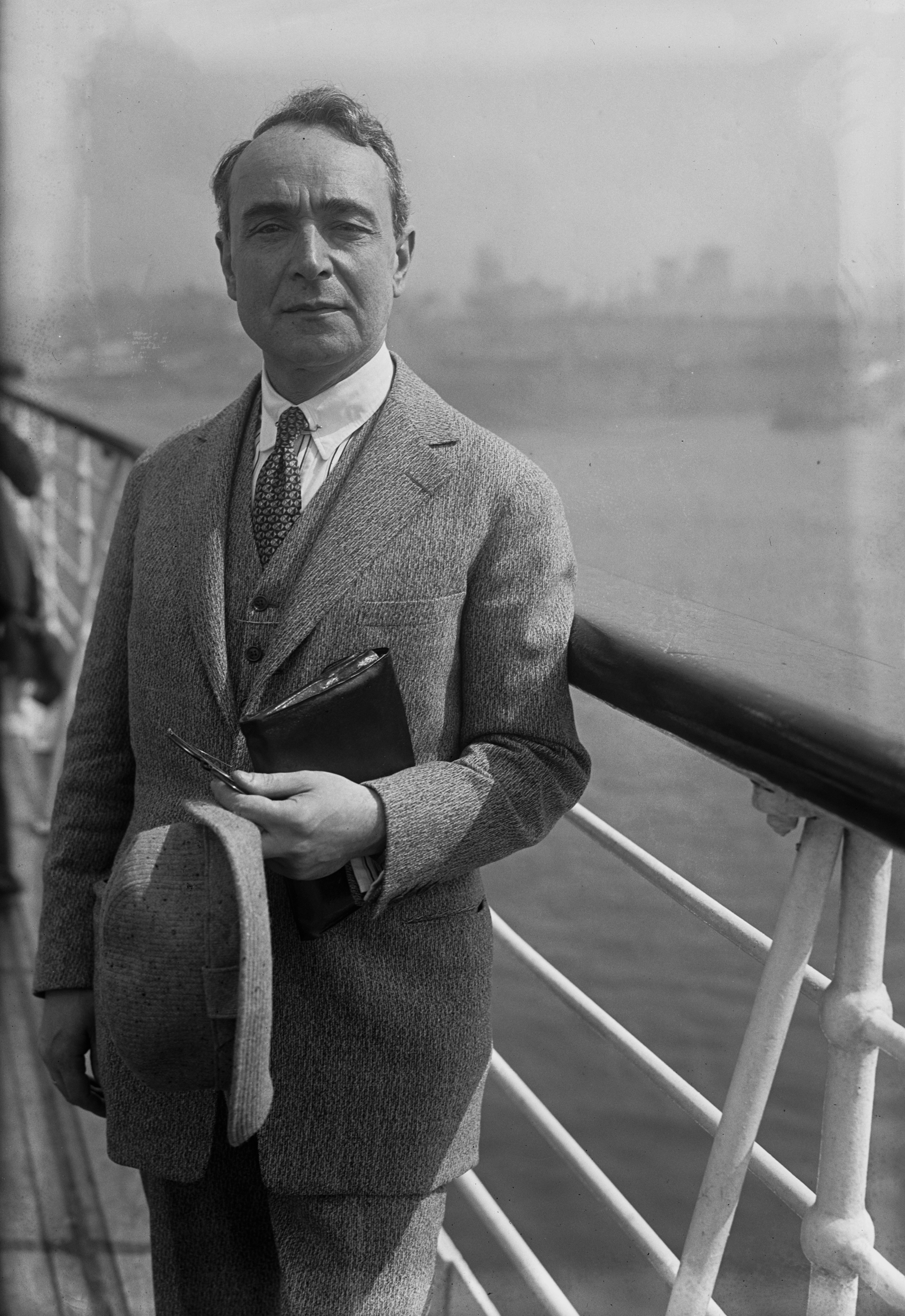
Serge Koussevitzky

In addition to Prokofiev, other reputable composers such as Igor Stravinsky, Paul Hindemith, and Arthur Honegger were also commissioned to write music for Boston in the 1930-1931 season. The Fourth Symphony was premiered on November 14, 1930 in Symphony Hall in Boston with Serge Koussevitzky conducting in the composer's absence. This symphony would be his third and final symphony to be composed outside of the Soviet Union.

Prokofiev finished the Fourth Symphony well before the deadline, and was optimistic about the work. Koussevitzky on the other hand was skeptical of Prokofiev's reworking of ideas from the ballet, and the premiere received a lukewarm reception. Music critics began accusing Prokofiev of running dry of ideas after several unsuccessful performances of the work. Prokofiev consequently provided a statement to a Soviet magazine protesting these accusations.

The European premiere of the Fourth Symphony occurred on December 18, 1930 in Brussels under Pierre Monteux. The program at this premiere would prove to be problematic, because Prokofiev's Piano Concerto No. 2 in G minor (which was first on the program) was a triumphant success, and overshadowed the Fourth Symphony, which immediately followed. The Fourth Symphony also received little to no positive attention at its Soviet premiere on October 30, 1933 at the Bolshoy Theater. Prokofiev persevered despite this trend of disappointment, and later in 1937 he performed the Fourth Symphony at a festival celebrating the 20th anniversary of the October Revolution. At this concert, Israel Nestyev states that the Fourth Symphony "was received coldly." These poor receptions not only hindered Prokofiev's confidence, but also drew negative attention from the Soviet Committee of Arts and Affairs.

== Symphony No. 4, Op. 112 ==
=== Context and genesis ===
In 1932, Joseph Stalin created the Union of Soviet Composers, and laid out a doctrine of "socialist realism" in art. This meant that for art to be supported by the regime, it had to be relevant to everyday people, and it needed to glorify the best of socialism. In reality, this led to bans of material disliked, or deemed "formalist", by the regime.

In the summer of 1936, after many recent trips and performances in the Soviet Union, the Prokofiev family moved there. Prokofiev had been promised many privileges, including the freedom to move freely, which were eventually curtailed. As Prokofiev was considering a return to the Soviet Union, he believed that the direction his music was taking at the time (a simpler, more straightforward style) would allow him to excel there.

Starting in 1946, there was an even more extreme crackdown on Soviet musicians, led by Andrei Zhdanov. Many works and composers were banned and warned, including Prokofiev himself, although he had been relatively successful and popular in the Soviet Union up until that time. In the winter of 1946-1947, he finished work on Symphony No. 6. Prokofiev was also working on his opera War and Peace, the second part of which would be subject to cancellation in the summer of 1947 by the authorities, due to the composer's refusal to cut certain controversial scenes.

In early 1947, Prokofiev was presented with the idea of revising his Symphony No. 4 Op. 47. The idea appealed to him for several reasons. First, the original version had never had much success (especially in the Soviet Union), but Prokofiev believed that the material had great potential. Second, he had just had great success with his Symphony No. 5 and he hoped to reshape No. 4 in its image. Symphony No. 5 had been in the style of socialist realism, so many of the changes in the revision lent the new work a more expansive and heroic feel. The revision altered the original so thoroughly that Prokofiev felt that it was a new work; thus the new opus number, 112. In the summer of 1947, when the revisions took place, he also orchestrated Symphony No. 6 and wrote two propaganda pieces: Festive Poem and Flourish, O Mighty Land, both works for large forces.

=== Instrumentation ===
These are the additional instruments that are added

- Woodwinds: E♭ Clarinet
- Brass: 1 trumpet
- Keyboard: Piano
- Percussion: Triangle, Tambourine, and Wood blocks
- Strings: Harp

=== Analysis ===
External audio
- Performed by the Berlin Philharmonic under Seiji Ozawa
- I. Andante - Allegro eroico
- II. Andante tranquillo
- III. Moderato, quasi allegretto
- IV. Allegro risoluto

==== I. Andante – Allegro eroico ====
In this revised first movement, the augmentation of the original material doubles the length of the movement. The orchestration of this movement is also thicker than the original, and more closely resembles the orchestration of Prokofiev's Fifth and Sixth. The combination of a heavier use of brass and the use of piano and harp adds a unique timbre to the piece, further distancing it from the original neoclassical idiom. The different sections are not as clearly identified by tempi as is the original symphony. In the introduction a new theme is added (ex.5) that precedes the original first theme.

Apart from this new theme, the introduction is essentially the same. The main difference in this revision is the heavily expanded development section. Prokofiev expands the sound palette with string Tremolos and dissonant chords in the brass. This movement also includes many more key changes and expands the machine-like ostinati from the first version. Prokofiev also utilizes more transitional material before introducing and underscoring the new subjects.

==== II. Andante tranquillo ====
To fit the larger scale of a socialist realist symphony, the second movement's revision basically doubles its length. It is extended primarily by repeating many thematic statements that only appeared once in Opus 47.

In this movement, the four-measure introduction is extended by four measures and supplemented with striking new harmonies. There are other such expansions: the B theme is doubled by alternating its sub-phrases with new material of a "ticking clock" quality. Later on, the A theme is also doubled in size: first it is played in E♭ major and then in B major. Consequently, there is a modulation to G major. At the 3/4, the melody in the oboes and English horn appears as in Opus 47, but here this passage leads to a reminiscence of the original introduction theme. After the appearance of the introduction theme, following a reappearance of theme A, Prokofiev moves quickly back to the original, restrained ending, taken from the ballet.

==== III. Moderato, quasi allegretto ====
In this movement, Prokofiev adds to the Scherzo and Trio a new introduction, extends the coda, and inserts material at the main transition points that further develop the subjects.

The introduction begins with a light touch, presenting motifs that anticipate the later themes. The newly added coda has a serious character created by the somber harmony and the momentary appearance of a chorale-like texture. Such serious, weighty passages place the original, lighter material in figurative quotation marks, almost mocking them as unserious or unworthy.

==== IV. Allegro risoluto ====
The finale is the movement that underwent the most alteration in the revision process. It is no longer in sonata form, but instead it is a series of thematic areas that are developed somewhat chaotically, followed by a triumphant apotheosis. It is similar in form to the finale of the Sixth Symphony in this way. An introduction is added, which takes the toccata-like material from the ballet's first number, and slows it to half the speed, and emphasizes the martial character by adding pounding timpani and bass drum (ex.6). The first theme and transition from Opus 47 follow, but then the second theme is deleted entirely.

Instead of the second theme, the transition moves into a dark and moody section in E♭ major and in 6/8 meter, resembling some kind of somber procession. After a somewhat abrupt end to this section, the original development from Opus 47 proceeds unaltered. Because the second theme from Opus 47 has been removed, there is no recapitulatory gesture. Instead, a new coda follows, with a quick, dancing theme. Prokofiev described this cancan-like material as "thievish." This theme is abruptly interrupted by the new, slowed-toccata idea from the introduction blaring out triumphantly, a victory cry for the people. The piece ends on this jarring, incongruous note.

=== Reception and performance history ===
In early 1948, shortly after the revisions of Opus 112 were completed, the Union of Soviet Composers issued commands that Prokofiev's music (among others) be banned from concert halls, amid accusations of "formalism." The revised Symphony No. 4 was thus not performed in the Soviet Union until 1957, after the composer's death.

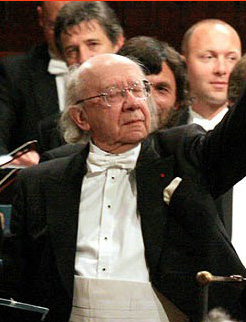
Gennadi Rozhdestvensky, 2007

Symphony No. 4 Op. 112 had three significant premiere performances. The first premiere was Sir Adrian Boult conducting the BBC Symphony Orchestra in a radio broadcast on March 11, 1950. The concert premiere was Gennadi Rozhdestvensky conducting the USSR State Symphony Orchestra on January 5, 1957 at the Great Hall of the Moscow Conservatory. Finally, the first performance of the Symphony No. 4 Op. 112 in the western hemisphere was by the Philadelphia Orchestra under the direction of Eugene Ormandy on September 27, 1957.

In a review of Neeme Järvi's recordings of Prokofiev's Third and Fourth Symphonies, Robert Cummings states that:

Opinion among musicologists and critics has tended to favor the earlier work, but conductors have shown a marked preference for the expanded version in both the concert hall and recording studio.

This statement is substantiated by the fact that there are twice as many recordings available of Opus 112 as there are of Opus 47. Robert Layton offers another perspective on the relationship between the two versions in his review of the Fourth Symphony. It provides some insight into the relative neglect that Opus 47 has felt, in comparison to the more monumental Opus 112:

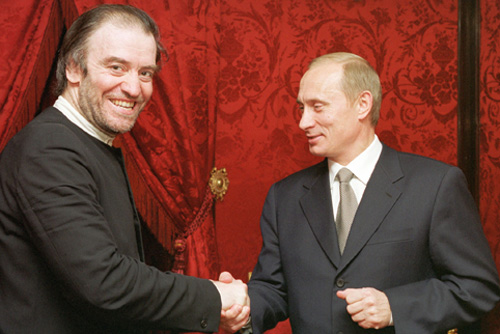
Valery Gergiev, with Vladimir Putin, 2001

It is generally agreed that the transformation from dance to symphony in the Fourth is accomplished with less success than is the metamorphosis from The Flaming Angel to the Third Symphony, and whether in reworking the 1930 version Prokofiev wholly succeeded remains open to question. Let us hope that the appearance of these scores presages a resurgence of interest in Prokofiev's Paris years, for works such as the now neglected Quintet, Op. 39, and the almost forgotten Divertissement for orchestra, Op. 43, deserve a far more prominent place in the repertory.

It was not until the mid-1980s that both Opus 47 and Opus 112 were presented in complete recordings of Prokofiev symphonies. Neeme Järvi was the first conductor to do this, in 1988, and presented them both as masterpieces worthy of attention. Opus 47 was subsequently deleted from the catalog, shortly after the album's release. It was not until Valery Gergiev released a Prokofiev complete symphonic recording in 2006 that Russia and the western world were again able to hear both versions. Mstislav Rostropovich has also presented both versions in a complete symphonic collection. In 2002, the first study score for Opus 47 was finally published.

== Recordings ==
=== Opus 47 ===
orchestra	conductor	record company	year of recording	format
Orchestre Colonne, Paris	Georges Sébastian	Urania	1954	LP
Orchestre National de l'ORTF	Jean Martinon	Vox Records	1972	LP
Scottish National Orchestra	Neeme Järvi	Chandos	1985	CD
Orchestre National de France	Mstislav Rostropovich	Erato	1988	CD
London Symphony Orchestra	Valery Gergiev	Philips	2 May 2004, live at Barbican Hall, London	CD
Gürzenich Orchestra, Cologne	Dmitri Kitajenko	Phoenix Edition	2008	CD
Bournemouth Symphony Orchestra	Kirill Karabits	Onyx Records	2014	CD
Netherlands Radio Philharmonic Orchestra	James Gaffigan	Northstar Recordings	2015	SACD

=== Opus 112 ===
orchestra	conductor	record company	year of recording	format
Moscow Radio Symphony Orchestra	Gennadi Rozhdestvensky	Melodiya	1959	LP
Philadelphia Orchestra	Eugene Ormandy	Columbia Masterworks	1960	LP
London Philharmonic	Walter Weller	Decca	1977	LP
Czech Philharmonic	Zdeněk Košler	Supraphon	1983	LP/CD
Scottish National Orchestra	Neeme Järvi	Chandos	1985	CD
Moscow Philharmonic	Dmitri Kitajenko	Melodiya	1987	CD
Orchestre National de France	Mstislav Rostropovich	Erato	1988	CD
Malmö Symphony Orchestra	James DePreist	BIS	1991	CD
Berlin Philharmonic	Seiji Ozawa	Deutsche Grammophon	1992	CD
National Symphony Orchestra of Ukraine	Theodore Kuchar	Naxos	1995	CD
London Symphony Orchestra	Valery Gergiev	Philips	6 May 2004, live at Barbican Hall, London	CD
Gürzenich Orchestra, Cologne	Dmitri Kitajenko	Phoenix Edition	2008	CD
Philadelphia Orchestra	Vladimir Jurowski	The Philadelphia Orchestra	2010	FLAC
São Paulo State Symphony Orchestra	Marin Alsop	Naxos	2012	CD
Bergen Philharmonic Orchestra	Andrew Litton	BIS Records	2014	SACD
Bournemouth Symphony Orchestra	Kirill Karabits	Onyx Records	2015	CD
Mariinsky Orchestra	Valery Gergiev	Mariinsky Records	2015	SACD
