= Symphony No. 2 (Piston) =

Symphony No. 2 by Walter Piston is a symphony composed in 1943.

Piston's Second Symphony was commissioned by the Alice M. Ditson Fund of Columbia University, and was premiered in Washington, D.C., on March 5, 1944, by the National Symphony Orchestra, conducted by Hans Kindler. On the day after the premiere, Kindler sent Piston a note declaring that the symphony "is without even the shadow of a doubt one of the half dozen great works written during the last ten years. It sings forever in my heart and in my consciousness, and it does not want to leave me."

Subsequent performances quickly followed, first by the Boston Symphony Orchestra, then in New York on May 12, 1945, by the NBC Symphony Orchestra at Columbia University's First Annual Festival of American Music, and again in New York by the New York Philharmonic Symphony, conducted by Artur Rodziński. On the basis of these New York performances, Piston won the Music Critics' Circle Award for the 1944–45 season. It was this work that established Piston's reputation as an important American composer.

== Analysis ==
The work is in three movements:

1. Moderato
2. Adagio
3. Allegro

A typical performance will last around 25 minutes.

Although as with all of his symphonies Piston does not specify a key, the outer movements are in A minor. The first movement is in sonata-allegro form, and begins with a rhythmically flexible, unpredictable 6/4 melody in the violas and cellos. The second subject is dancelike, featuring the percussion, and the exposition concludes with a brief fugato. The first subject is darkened at the beginning of the development, which gradually expands to large phrases in the full orchestra. In the recapitulation, the contrasts between the two main subjects is increased, and the coda brings the first theme back in pianissimo.

The Adagio features a long-breathed Italianate melody introduced in the clarinet that is spun out in a seemingly improvisatory way, but in fact cost Piston a great deal of effort. Leonard Bernstein chose this Adagio to perform with the New York Philharmonic as a memorial tribute when Piston died. This openly romantic movement possesses the characteristic grace of Piston's second creative period, and spins out its theme in a manner reminiscent of a large, figured chorale prelude.

The finale is energetic and assertive, alternating three contrasting themes. The first is fanfare-like in the brass, the second dance-like, and the third a lyrical, expressive melody introduced by the English horn and clarinet together.

== Recordings ==
Despite the symphony's accessibility and significance in Piston's career, it has not been recorded frequently. Releases have included:

- American Recording Society Orchestra, Dean Dixon (American Record Society) – 1953
- Boston Symphony Orchestra, Michael Tilson Thomas (Deutsche Grammophon) – 1971
- Seattle Symphony, Gerard Schwarz (Delos / Naxos) – 1990
