= Symphony No. 8 (Piston) =

The Symphony No. 8 by Walter Piston is a symphony dating from 1965.

== History ==
The Boston Symphony Orchestra commissioned the Eighth Symphony and gave its first performance on March 5, 1965, conducted by Erich Leinsdorf, to whom the score is dedicated. Initially, Piston had preferred to write a flute concerto for the Boston Symphony's principal flautist, Doriot Anthony Dwyer, but Leinsdorf preferred a symphony. The concerto was eventually composed in 1971. According to another account, however, it was Piston himself who expressed a preference for a symphony.

== Analysis ==
The work is in three movements:

1. Moderato mosso (♩ = 80)
2. Lento assai
3. Allegro marcato

The symphony is about 20 minutes in duration.

Although Piston had occasionally employed twelve-tone technique from early on, it is much more in evidence in the Eighth Symphony than ever before, and this brings with it a heightened level of impassioned, almost tragic expression. The first movement begins with a melody constructed from the twelve-tone series, C–D♭–E–F–A♭–G–F♯–E♭–D–A–B–B♭, accompanied by two six-note chords consisting of the second and first hexachords of the same row. This series lends the music a dark solemnity because of its emphasis on minor seconds and minor thirds.

After such a slow, prelude-like opening movement, a slow second movement is somewhat surprising. It is in variation form. The theme is announced in the bassoon followed by the flute, with subsequent variations in the strings, a moderato mosso, and three further variations.

The concluding Allegro marcato is in a large binary form with a short coda. Like most Piston finales, it is rhythmically propulsive. Inversion of melodic lines is a significant feature of this movement, which concludes with a spirited timpani solo.

== Reception ==
Reviews of the symphony's premiere were mixed, which had not been the case since the premiere of the First Symphony. Piston's biographer believes the similarity in response was due to similar weaknesses in the two symphonies, including "murky and surreal details that overwhelm the formal design".
