= Clarinet Concerto (Piston) =

Musical composition by Walter Piston

Walter Piston's Concerto for Clarinet and Orchestra was written in 1967. It was commissioned for the Hopkins Center Congregation of the Arts at Dartmouth College by its music director, Mario di Bonaventura, who conducted the world premiere on August 6, 1967, at the Congregation of Arts Festival, with clarinetist Donald Wendlant and the Dartmouth Symphony Orchestra.

== Structure ==
It consists of a single movement composed by Piston in four variations without theme:

1. Variation I Con moto
2. Variation II Poco piu mosso
3. Variation III Assai lento
4. Variation IV Allegro—Vivo

The unusual structure was inspired by the success of the composer's earlier Variations for Cello and Orchestra (1966). The average performance time is around 12 minutes.

== Analysis ==
The Concerto is characterized by consistency and formal balance, which produces a satisfying sense of unity. Another prominent feature is the syncopated energetic rhythm that is typical of Piston's music. This is particularly prominent in the scherzo, which employs delicate percussion tapping also typical of the composer. The three fast movements are in each in an A-B-A ternary form with a more lyrical B section providing contrast to the more vigorous outer parts. The last movement begins with a stately introductory Allegro in duple meter followed by the finale proper, a Vivo in changing meters (7/8, 5/8, 3/4, etc.). Instead of a cadenza there are short unaccompanied solos serving as transitions between the movements.
