= String Quartet No. 2 (Piston) =

String Quartet No. 2 by Walter Piston is a chamber-music work composed in 1935. Piston's second string quartet was composed two years after his First Quartet and, like it, was premiered by the Chardon Quartet, on March 16, 1935. It was written, together with the Piano Trio, while Piston was on a Guggenheim Fellowship.

== Analysis ==
The quartet is in three movements:

1. Lento (9/8) – Allegro (6/8)
2. Adagio molto e con espressione (12/8)
3. Allegro giusto (2/4)

The restlessly chromatic Lento introduction to the first movement is built on a three-note motive, A–C–D♭, that is found also in a number of the composer's other works. The boisterous main allegro portion of the movement is in A minor and sonata-allegro form.

The slow movement is based on the motive from the Lento introduction of the first, and is in a chromatically inflected C major.

The finale is in changing meters, with a dissonant-contrapuntal first theme, and a pandiatonic second one that wavers between G major and E♭ major. These tonalities contrast sharply with the equally wavering A minor and C major tonalities of the movement as a whole, which remain undecided until an A minor cadence at the end of the coda, followed immediately by a surprising Picardy third A-major triad.

== Discography ==
- 1950. Walter Piston: String Quartet No. 2; Ernest Bloch: String Quartet No. 2. University of Oregon String Quartet. Recorded in concert, November 6, 1950. 2-LP set. Portland, Oregon: Electronic Sound & Recording Co.
- 1979. Walter Piston: String Quartet No. 2; Roger Sessions: String Quartet No. 1, E minor. Budapest String Quartet. Recorded Anthology of American Music. New World Records NW 302. New York: New World Records.
- 1985. Walter Piston: String Quartet No. 1; String Quartet No. 2. Portland String Quartet. LP recording. Northeastern Records NR 216. Boston, Massachusetts: Northeastern Records. Reissued as part of Walter Piston: String Quartet No. 1; String Quartet No. 2; String Quartet No. 3. The Portland String Quartet (Stephen Kecskemethy and Ronald Lanz, violins; Julia Adams, viola; Paul Ross, cello). CD recording. Northeastern NR 9001 CD. Boston: Northeastern University, 1988.
