= Capriccio for Harp and String Orchestra =

1963 composition by Walter Piston

Walter Piston's Capriccio for Harp and String Orchestra was commissioned in 1963 by Broadcast Music Incorporated on the occasion of its twentieth anniversary, and is dedicated to the harpist Nicanor Zabaleta, who premiered it in Madrid on October 19, 1964.

The work is in one movement and lasts for approximately 10 minutes.
