= Symphony No. 1 (Kalinnikov) =

Symphony by Vasily Kalinnikov

- by Vasily Kalinnikov
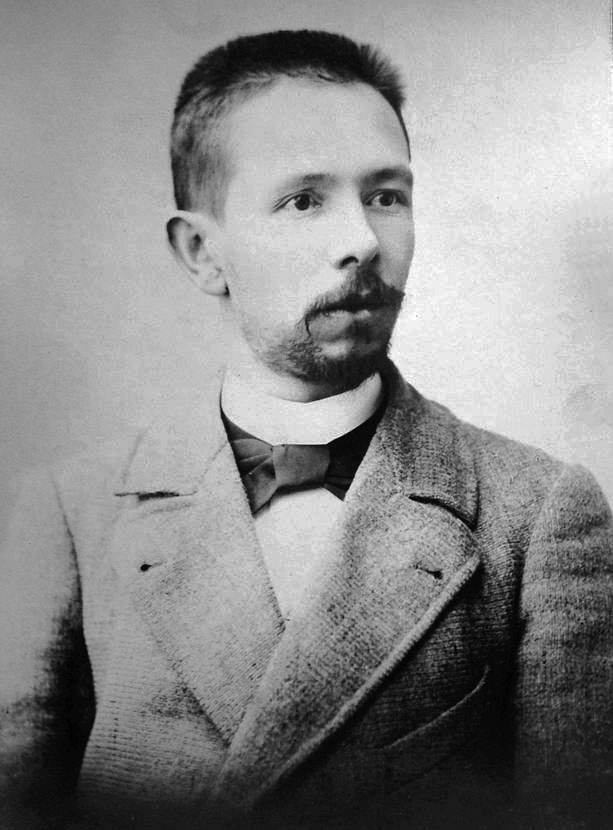
- The composer on a postcard from the 1910s
- Key: G minor
- Composed: 1894–95
- Dedication: Semyon Kruglikov
- Published: 1900
- Movements: 4

Premiere
- Date: 1897
- Location: Kiev

The Symphony No. 1 in G minor by Russian composer Vasily Kalinnikov was written from 1894 to 1895 and first published in 1900. The symphony is dedicated to Russian music critic and teacher Semyon Kruglikov.

== History ==
=== Background ===
After contracting tuberculosis in 1893 while serving as conductor of the Maly Theatre in Moscow, Kalinnikov moved to Yalta for a more salubrious climate. It was there that he composed his first symphony. Upon completion in 1895, the symphony's score was sent to its dedicatee Semyon Kruglikov, who was Kalinnikov's teacher and financial benefactor. Kruglikov recommended the work to the country's leading conductors. The score was also sent to Rimsky-Korsakov, who was less supportive of the score, particularly its technical aspects, but was overall impressed by the composition.

=== Premiere ===
The symphony was premiered in 1897 at the Russian Music Society in Kiev. It was conducted by Alexander Vinogradsky and was received well by the audience, who gave the second and third movements an encore. The success of the premiere was followed by performances in Vienna, Paris, London, Berlin, and Moscow.

== Instrumentation ==
The symphony is scored for:

Woodwinds
piccolo
2 flutes
2 oboes
cor anglais
2 clarinets
2 bassoons

Brass
4 horns
2 trumpets
3 trombones
tuba

Percussion
timpani
triangle

Strings
harp

violins I, II
violas
cellos
double basses

== Form ==
The symphony is in four movements:

1. Allegro moderato (G minor)
2. Andante commodamente (E♭ major)
3. Scherzo: Allegro non troppo (C major)
4. Finale: Allegro moderato (G major)

The first movement is in sonata form and opens with the main theme played in unison strings. The second theme is also presented by the strings, with woodwinds in the background. The development section is contrapuntal in nature, reminiscent of the fugues Kalinnikov composed in the 1880s. The second movement opens with an ostinato of the harp and first violins that leads into a solo for the cor anglais with the violas. Then the movement's main theme is played by the oboe to pizzicato strings. The third movement, a scherzo, contains Russian folk-music influences and melodies and includes a trio played in the woodwinds. The Finale opens with the first movement's main theme before revisiting and transforming themes from all previous movements as well as incorporating new themes derived from old ones. The symphony concludes with a triumphal ending played by the full orchestra. A typical performance lasts around 40 minutes.

== Recordings ==
The following is a list of recordings of the work, listing year, orchestra, and conductor:

- 1941: Indianapolis Symphony Orchestra, Fabien Sevitzky
- 1943: NBC Symphony Orchestra, Arturo Toscanini
- 1951: Czech Philharmonic, Hermann Scherchen
- 1952–55: Moscow Philharmonic, Natan Rakhlin
- 1975: USSR State Symphony Orchestra, Evgeny Svetlanov
- 1960: Moscow Philharmonic, Kirill Kondrashin
- 1987: Royal Scottish National Orchestra, Neeme Järvi
- 1993 (Finale only): United States Marine Band, Timothy Foley
- 1994: National Symphony Orchestra of Ukraine, Theodore Kuchar
- 2003: Iceland Symphony Orchestra, Vladimir Ashkenazy
- 2011: Malaysian Philharmonic Orchestra, Kees Bakels

== See also ==
- Symphony No. 2 (Kalinnikov)
