= String Quartet No. 3 (Piston) =

String Quartet No. 3 by Walter Piston is a chamber-music work composed in 1947. Piston's third string quartet was commissioned by Harvard University and first performed by the Walden String Quartet on May 1, 1947. It is dedicated to Diran Alexanian.

== Analysis ==
The quartet is in three movements:

1. Allegro
2. Lento
3. Allegro

Both of the outer movements are in sonata-allegro form, and are in F minor. The central Lento movement is a calm theme and variations in C minor. However, the first movement actually begins in A♭ major/minor, only gradually settling into F minor at the end, and the variation movement spends a lot of its time in the parallel major (the dominant of F minor). However, Piston's characteristic flexibility of tonality and thickly chromatic harmony makes it simplest to omit key signatures.

== Discography ==
- 1984. Walter Piston: String Quartet No. 3; String Quartet No. 4. Portland String Quartet. Sounds of New England LP recording. Northeastern Records NR 214. Boston, Massachusetts: Northeastern Records. Third Quartet reissued on Walter Piston: String Quartet No. 1; String Quartet No. 2; String Quartet No. 3. The Portland String Quartet (Stephen Kecskemethy and Ronald Lanz, violins; Julia Adams, viola; Paul Ross, cello). CD recording. Northeastern NR 9001 CD. Boston: Northeastern University, 1988.
- 2010. Walter Piston: String Quartets Nos. 1, 3 and 5. Harlem Quartet. CD Recording. Naxos 8.559630 [Hong Kong]: Naxos Records.
