= String Quartet No. 5 (Piston) =

String Quartet No. 5 by Walter Piston is a chamber-music work composed in 1962. Piston's fifth string quartet was commissioned for the 1962 Berlin Festival by the Kroll Quartet, who gave the first performance on October 8, 1962. It was awarded the New York Music Critics Circle Award in 1964.

== Analysis ==
The quartet is in three movements:

1. Allegro
2. Adagio
3. Allegro

Each movement is based on twelve-tone technique, though the character is cool and refined, as usual with Piston. The first movement is a binary sonata form with novel textures, tonal relations, and dynamic twists. The second movement is in variation form, with a theme presented initially as if it were a four-voice fugue, and subsequent formal ambiguities. The finale is a seven-part rondo (A–B–A–C–A–B–A), though the basic design is obscured by a number of formal devices, which led one analyst to believe it is a fugue with three subjects.

== Discography ==
- 1974. American String Quartets, Volume II: 1900–1950. Kohon String Quartet. 3-LP set. Vox SVBX 5305 (set); VS 4627–4632. (Peter Mennin: String Quartet No. 2; Aaron Copland: Pieces for String Quartet; Walter Piston: String Quartet No. 5; George Gershwin: Lullaby; Virgil Thomson: String Quartet No. 2; Charles Ives: Scherzo for String Quartet; William Schuman: String Quartet No. 3; Roger Sessions: String Quartet No. 2; Howard Hanson: String Quartet, Op. 23.) New York: Vox, 1974.
- 1982. Walter Piston: String Quartet No. 5; Quintet for Flute and String Quartet. Doriot Anthony Dwyer, flute; Portland String Quartet. LP recording, 12 in. Northeastern Records NR 208. Boston, Massachusetts: Northeastern Records. Reissued as part of Walter Piston: String Quartet No. 4; String Quartet No. 5; Quintet for Flute and Strings. Doriot Anthony Dwyer, flute; Portland String Quartet. Sounds of New England. CD recording. Northeastern NR 9002-CD. Boston, Massachusetts: Northeastern Records, 1988.
- 2010. Walter Piston: String Quartets Nos. 1, 3 and 5. Harlem Quartet. CD Recording. Naxos 8.559630. [Hong Kong]: Naxos Records.
