= String Quartet No. 1 (Piston) =

String Quartet No. 1 by Walter Piston is a chamber-music work composed in 1933. Piston's first string quartet was premiered on March 7, 1933, by the Chardon Quartet, to whom it is dedicated. It later became a favorite of the Juilliard Quartet. Aaron Copland singled out this quartet, praising its "acidulous opening movement, the poetic mood painting of its second, and its breezy finale", all of which "sets a superb standard of taste and of expert string writing".

== Analysis ==
The quartet is in three movements:

1. Allegro (3/4)
2. Adagio (8/8)
3. Allegro vivace (2/4, 5/8)

The first movement is in sonata-allegro form in a mixed C major/C minor. The harmonic language stresses chords based on perfect fourths, and features the chromatic, dissonant counterpoint characteristic of Piston's early period. A nightmarish quality is produced by the approach to the F minor second, waltz-like theme through C♯ minor.

The second movement is a simple ABA in E minor, with the strings muted in the brooding, chromatic outer sections, and an unmuted fugato in sharply dotted rhythms in the central part. This movement especially features the cello.

The rondo finale is based throughout on a repeated-note motive of three sixteenth notes, and the first subject recalls the quartet's opening movement by alternating C and D♭. The string writing here is expert and spectacular, with some disorienting harmonic twists.

== Discography ==
- 1939. Walter Piston: String Quartet no. 1; Henry Cowell: Movements for String Quartet (1928). Dorian String Quartet. 78 RPM recording, 3 sound discs. Columbia Masterworks M 388 (set) Columbia Masterworks; 69745-D 69746-D; 69747-D. [Bridgeport, Connecticut]: Columbia Masterworks.
- 1954. Gian Francesco Malipiero: Rispetti e strambotti; Walter Piston: String Quartet [no. 1]. Juilliard String Quartet. Pittsburgh International Contemporary Music Festival, 1952. LP recording. American Society of Composers, Authors and Publishers CB 156—CB 157. New York: American Society of Composers, Authors and Publishers.
- 1985. Walter Piston: String Quartet No. 1; String Quartet No. 2. Portland String Quartet. LP recording. Northeastern Records NR 216. Boston, Massachusetts: Northeastern Records. Reissued as part of Walter Piston: String Quartet No. 1; String Quartet No. 2; String Quartet No. 3. The Portland String Quartet (Stephen Kecskemethy and Ronald Lanz, violins; Julia Adams, viola; Paul Ross, cello). CD recording. Northeastern NR 9001 CD. Boston: Northeastern University, 1988.
- 1991. Walter Piston: Quartet No. 1. Quincy Porter: Quartet No. 3; Samuel Barber: String Quartet in B Minor, op. 11. The Chester String Quartet (Fritz Gearhart, Kathryn Votapek, violins; Ronald Goravic, viola; Thomas Rosenberg, cello). CD recording. Koch International Classics 3-7069-2 H1. [Westbury, New York]: Koch International Classics.
- 2010. Walter Piston: String Quartets Nos. 1, 3 and 5. Harlem Quartet. CD Recording. Naxos 8.559630 [Hong Kong]: Naxos Records.
