= Violin Concerto No. 1 (Piston) =

Violin concerto by Walter Piston

Walter Piston's Concerto No. 1 for Violin and Orchestra was written in 1939 and dedicated to violinist Ruth Posselt. Posselt, backed by the National Orchestral Association under Léon Barzin, gave the first performance at Carnegie Hall on 18 March 1940. Amongst the audience was composer Benjamin Britten, who is quoted as telling Aaron Copland, "there was no composer in England of Piston’s age who could turn out anything so expert."

== Structure ==
The work is in three movements:

1. Allegro energico
2. Andantino molto tranquillo
3. Allegro con spirito

A typical performance will last around 25 minutes.
