= Vasily Kalinnikov =

Russian composer

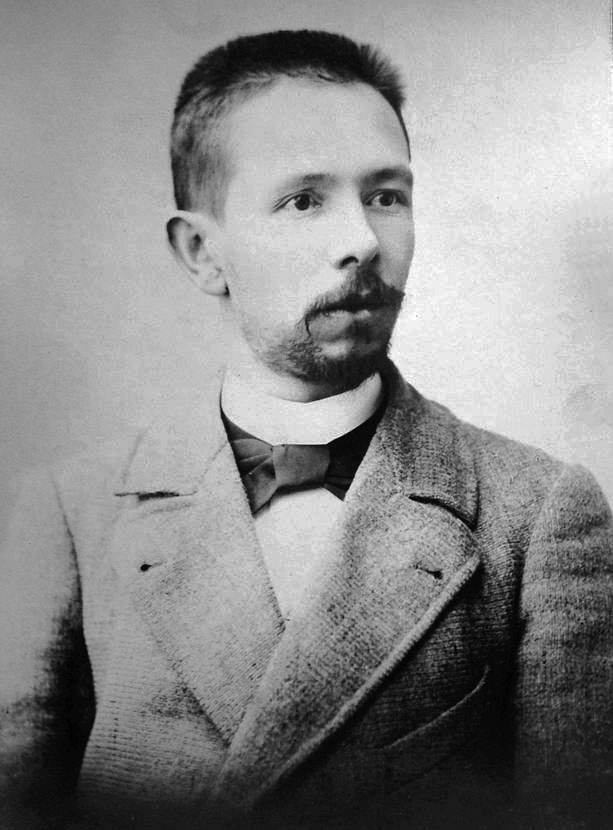
Vasily Kalinnikov

Vasily Sergeyevich Kalinnikov (Russian: Васи́лий Серге́евич Кали́нников; 13 January 1866 [O.S. 1 January 1866] – 11 January 1901 [O.S. 29 December 1900]) was a Russian composer. His body of work consists of two symphonies, several additional orchestral works, and numerous songs, all of them imbued with characteristics of folksong. His symphonies, particularly the First, were frequently performed in the early 20th century. Kalinnikov's musical style was inspired by composers like Tchaikovsky and Rimsky-Korsakov, and is notable for its expressive melodies and lush orchestration.

His younger brother Viktor Kalinnikov (1870–1927) was also a composer, mainly of choral music.

== Biography ==
Kalinnikov was a police official's son. He studied at the seminary at Oryol, becoming director of the choir there at fourteen. Later he went to the Moscow Conservatory but could not afford the tuition fees. On a scholarship, he went to the Moscow Philharmonic Society School, where he received bassoon and composition lessons from Alexander Ilyinsky. He played bassoon, timpani and violin in theater orchestras and supplemented his income working as a music copyist.

In 1892, Pyotr Ilyich Tchaikovsky recommended Kalinnikov for the position of main conductor of the Maly Theatre, and later that same year to the Moscow Italian Theatre. However, due to his worsening tuberculosis, Kalinnikov had to resign from his theatre appointments and move to the warmer southern climate of the Crimea. He lived at Yalta for the rest of his life, and it was there that he wrote the main part of his music, including his two symphonies and the incidental music for Alexey Tolstoy's Tsar Boris. In Yalta he joined two other famous tubercular patients, Maxim Gorky and Anton Chekhov. Exhausted, he died of tuberculosis on 11 January 1901, just two days before his 35th birthday. He was survived by his widow and his brother, Viktor Kalinnikov, who composed choral music and taught at the Moscow Philharmonic Society School.

Vasily Kalinnikov's reputation was established with his First Symphony, written between 1894 and 1895, which had great success when Alexander Vinogradsky conducted it at a Russian Musical Society concert in Kyiv on 20 February 1897. Further performances swiftly followed, in Moscow, Vienna, Berlin, and Paris. It was not published until after his death.

At Sergei Rachmaninoff's suggestion (following a visit to Kalinnikov in his illness), Tchaikovsky's publisher P. Jurgenson bought three Kalinnikov songs for 120 rubles. After Kalinnikov's death Jurgenson purchased the Symphony No. 2 in A major and other works from his widow for a high sum, commenting that his death "had multiplied the value of his works by ten".

In Russia, his First Symphony remains in the repertory, and his place in musical history is secure. On 7 November 1943, Arturo Toscanini conducted the NBC Symphony Orchestra in a rare broadcast performance of the First Symphony; although the performance was recorded, it was never commercially released by RCA Victor, but was released as a CD recording in 2006.

== Works ==
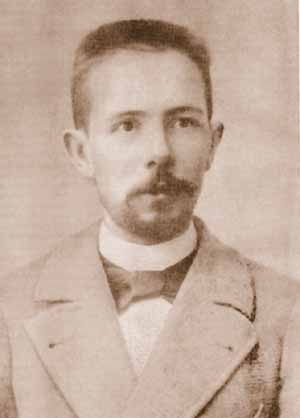
Vasily Sergeyevich Kalinnikov

Opera

- In 1812 (В 1812 году) (1899–1900); incomplete

Orchestral

- Fugue in D minor (1889)
- Nymphs (Нимфы), Symphonic Picture after Ivan Turgenev (1889)
- Serenade (Серенада) in G minor for string orchestra (1891)
- Suite (Сюита) in B minor (1891–1892)
- Bylina (Былина: Эпическая поэма), Epic Poem (Overture) (c. 1892)
- Overture in D minor (1894)
- Symphony No. 1 in G minor (1894–1895)
- Symphony No. 2 in A major (1895–1897)
- Intermezzo No. 1 (Интермеццо No. 1) in F♯ minor (1896)
- Intermezzo No. 2 (Интермеццо No. 2) in G major (1897)
- The Cedar and the Palm (Кедр и пальма; Le Cèdre et le palmier), Symphonic Picture after Heinrich Heine (1897–1898)
- Tsar Boris (Царь Борис), Incidental Music to the tragedy by Aleksey Konstantinovich Tolstoy (1898)

Piano

- Moderato in E♭ minor
- Polonaise on a Theme from Symphony No. 1 (Полонез на темы Симфонии No. 1) in B♭ major for piano 4-hands
- Scherzo in F major (1888–1889)
- Chanson triste (Грустная песенка) in G minor (1892–1893)
- Nocturne (Ноктюрн) in F♯ minor (1892–1893)
- Élégie (Элегия) in B♭ minor (1894)
- Minuet (Менуэт) in E major (1894)
- Russian Intermezzo (Русское интермеццо) in F minor (1894)
- Waltz (Вальс) in A major (1894)

Vocal

- Come to Me (Приди ко мне) for soprano, alto, baritone and piano; words by Aleksey Koltsov
- I Am Yours, My Darling (Я ли тебя, моя радость) for voice and piano; words by Heinrich Heine
- I Would Like to Make My Songs into Wonderful Flowers (Я желал бы своей песней) for voice and piano; words by Heinrich Heine
- On the Old Burial Mound (На старом кургане) for voice and piano (1887); words by Ivan Savvich Nikitin
- On Your Lovely Little Shoulder Dear (На чудное плечико милой; An Liebchens schneeweisse Schulter) for voice and piano (1887); words by Heinrich Heine in translation by Vasily Pavlovich Fyodorov (1883–1942)
- When Life Is Weighed Down with Suffering (Когда жизнь гнетут страданья и муки) for voice and piano (1887); words by Polivanov
- 16 Musical Letters (16 Музыкальных писем) for voice and piano (1892–1899)
- Bright Stars (Звёзды ясные) for voice and piano (1894); words by Konstantin Fofanov
- The Gentle Stars Shone Down on Us (Нам звёзды кроткие мерцали) for voice and piano (1894); words by Aleksey Pleshcheyev
- There Was an Old King (Был старый король) for voice and piano (1894); words by Heinrich Heine in translation by Aleksey Pleshcheyev
- A Present for 1 January 1900 for voice and piano (1899)
- Bells (Колокола) for voice and piano (1900); words by K. R.
- Prayer (Молитва: "О Боже мой") for voice and piano (1900); words by Aleksey Pleshcheyev
- Do Not Ask Why I Smile in Thought (Не спрашивай, зачем...) for voice and piano (1901); words by Alexander Pushkin

Choral

- The Triumph of Lilliput for chorus and piano
- Cherubic Hymn No. 1 (Херувимская песнь No. 1) for chorus (1885)
- Cherubic Hymn No. 2 (Херувимская песнь No. 2) for chorus (1886)
- The Mountain Tops (Горные вершины) for chorus (1887)
- Christe Eleison for chorus (1889)
- Lord, Our Lord for chorus (1889)
- John of Damascus (Иоанн Дамаскин), Cantata for soloists, chorus and orchestra (1890); words by Aleksey Konstantinovich Tolstoy
- A Beautiful Girl Sits by the Sea (Баллада: Над морем красавица дева сидит), Ballade for female chorus and orchestra (1894); words by Mikhail Lermontov
