= Symphony No. 3 (Piston) =

The Symphony No. 3 by Walter Piston was composed in 1946–47. The Koussevitzky Music Foundation commissioned the Third Symphony and Piston began work on it in 1946, completing the score at Woodstock, Vermont, in the summer of 1947. It was premiered on January 9, 1948, by the Boston Symphony Orchestra conducted by Serge Koussevitzky. The composer dedicated the score to the memory of the conductor's wife, Natalie Koussevitzky.

Piston was awarded the 1948 Pulitzer Prize in Music Composition for the Third Symphony.

== Analysis ==
The work, like the later Fourth and Sixth Symphonies is in four movements:

1. Andantino (5/4)
2. Allegro (2/4)
3. Adagio (4/4)
4. Allegro (4/4)

The symphony lasts about 35 minutes.

The symphony opens with a slow movement, involving three main themes. This is followed by a scherzo with trio and a slow variation movement. The finale is interpreted by one writer as a celebration of the end of the Second World War.
