= Symphonic Sketches =

Musical composition by George Whitefield Chadwick, composed around 1895-1904

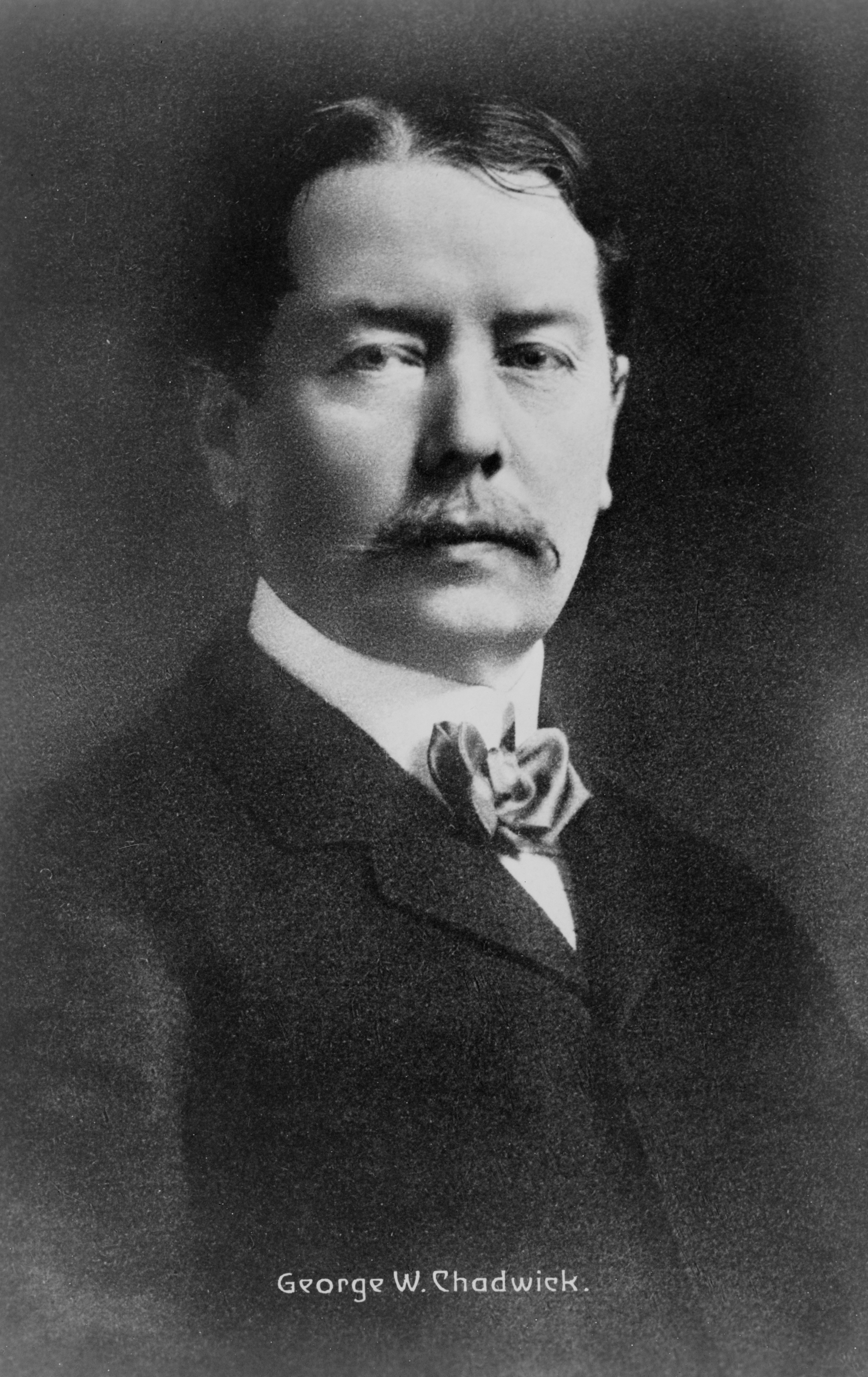
George Whitefield Chadwick

Symphonic Sketches was composed by George Whitefield Chadwick from about 1895 to 1904. Each of the four movements is inspired by a scene depiction, much like snapshots in an album, drawings, or vignettes. The style largely stems from Chadwick’s experience with the Duveneck Boys, a group of free-spirited artists led by Frank Duveneck.

== Analysis ==
I. Jubilee
Performed by the U.S. Marine Band for the album Director's Choice. Composed 1904, performed 1995 (8:04)

The piece consists of four movements:

1. Jubilee
2. Noël
3. Hobgoblin
4. A Vagrom Ballad

The composer's intentions are specified by bits of poetry opposite each title page.

For Sketch No. 1, "Jubilee",

No cool gray tones for me!
Give me the warmest red and green,
A cornet and a tambourine,
To paint my Jubilee!

For when pale flutes and oboes play,
To sadness I become a prey;
Give me the violets and the May,
But no gray skies for me.

For Sketch No. 2, "Noël",

Through the soft, calm moonlight comes a sound;
A mother lulls her babe, and all around
The gentle snow lies glistening;
On such a night the Virgin Mother mild
In dreamless slumber wrapped the Holy Child,
While angel-hosts were listening.

For Sketch No. 3. "Hobgoblin", words from Shakespeare,

That shrewd and knavish sprite
Called Robin Goodfellow.

For Sketch No. 4, "A Vagrom Ballad",

A tale of tramps and railway ties,
Or old clay pipes and rum,
Of broken heads and blacken eyes
And the "thirty days" to come!

The second movement was composed for the birth of Chadwick's son, whose name Noël is French for Christmas. The opening poem is reminiscent of the Christmas song Silent Night. The English horn solo portrays a similar atmosphere as in the second movement of Dvořák’s 9th Symphony (1893), where they both have a pentatonic scale in D-flat. Noël evokes a feeling of serenity and homeyness.

The fourth movement was inspired by vagrants near a railway track in Springfield, Massachusetts. It is described as "A jaunty irreverence, a snapping of the fingers at Fate and the Universe, that we do not recognize in music of foreign composers..." It contains a distinctive bass clarinet solo and a somewhat haphazard organization with unexpected periods of silence, tempo changes, and slapstick cliffhangers. There is also a brief Impressionist and Arabesque interlude which showed his influence from the French style.

== Recordings ==
Several recordings of the complete score have been released on compact disc:

- Howard Hanson, Eastman-Rochester Pops Orchestra, Mercury Records
- Neeme Järvi, Detroit Symphony Orchestra, Chandos Records
- Theodore Kuchar, Ukraine State Radio Symphony Orchestra, Naxos Records
- José Serebrier, Czech Philharmonic Orchestra, Reference Records
- Andrew Constantine, BBC National Orchestra of Wales, Orchid Classics
