= Walter Piston =

American composer (1894–1976)

- Piston in 1946
- Born: Walter Hamor Piston Jr. January 20, 1894; Rockland, Maine, U.S.
- Died: November 12, 1976 (aged 82); Belmont, Massachusetts, U.S.
- Occupations: Composer, music theorist, and professor of music
- Employer: Harvard University

Walter Hamor Piston, Jr. (January 20, 1894 – November 12, 1976), was an American composer of classical music, music theorist, and professor of music at Harvard University.

== Life ==
Piston was born in Rockland, Maine, at 15 Ocean Street to Walter Hamor Piston, a bookkeeper, and Leona Stover. He was the second of four children. His paternal grandfather was a sailor named Antonio Pistone, who changed his name to Anthony Piston when he came to Maine from Genoa, Italy. In 1905 the composer's father, Walter Piston Sr, moved with his family to Boston, Massachusetts.

Walter Jr first trained as an engineer at the Mechanical Arts High School in Boston, but was artistically inclined. After graduating in 1912, he enrolled in the Massachusetts Normal Art School, where he completed a four-year program in fine art in 1916.

During the 1910s, Piston made a living playing piano and violin in dance bands and later playing violin in orchestras led by Georges Longy. During World War I, he joined the U.S. Navy as a band musician after rapidly teaching himself to play saxophone; he later stated that, when "it became obvious that everybody had to go into the service, I wanted to go in as a musician". While playing in a service band, he taught himself to play most wind instruments. "They were just lying around," he later observed, "and no one minded if you picked them up and found out what they could do".

Piston was admitted to Harvard College in 1920, where he studied counterpoint with Archibald Davison, canon and fugue with Clifford Heilman, advanced harmony with Edward Ballantine, and composition and music history with Edward Burlingame Hill. He often worked as an assistant for various music professors there, and conducted the student orchestra.

In 1920, Piston married artist Kathryn Nason (1892–1976), who had been a fellow student at the Normal Art School. The marriage lasted until her death in February 1976, a few months before his own.

On graduating summa cum laude from Harvard, Piston was awarded a John Knowles Paine Traveling Fellowship. He chose to go to Paris, living there from 1924 to 1926. At the Ecole Nationale de Musique in Paris, he studied composition and counterpoint with Nadia Boulanger, composition with Paul Dukas and violin with George Enescu. His Three Pieces for Flute, Clarinet, and Bassoon of 1925 was his first published score.

He taught at Harvard from 1926 until his retirement in 1960. His students include Samuel Adler, Leroy Anderson, Arthur Berger, Leonard Bernstein, Gordon Binkerd, Elliott Carter, John Davison, Irving Fine, John Harbison, Karl Kohn, Ellis B. Kohs, Gail Kubik, Billy Jim Layton, Noël Lee, Robert Middleton, Robert Moevs, Daniel Pinkham, Mildred Barnes Royse, Frederic Rzewski, Allen Sapp, Harold Shapero, and Claudio Spies, as well as Frank D'Accone, Ann Ronell, Robert Strassburg, Yehudi Wyner, and William P. Perry. See: List of music students by teacher: N to Q#Walter Piston.

In 1936, the Columbia Broadcasting System commissioned six American composers (Aaron Copland, Louis Gruenberg, Howard Hanson, Roy Harris, William Grant Still and Piston) to write works for broadcast on CBS radio. Piston wrote his Symphony No. 1 and conducted its premiere with the Boston Symphony Orchestra on April 8, 1938.

Piston's only dance work, The Incredible Flutist, was written for the Boston Pops Orchestra, which premiered it with Arthur Fiedler conducting on May 30, 1938. The dancers were Hans Weiner and his company. Soon after, Piston arranged a concert suite including "a selection of the best parts of the ballet." This version was premiered by Fritz Reiner and the Pittsburgh Symphony Orchestra on November 22, 1940. Leonard Slatkin and the St. Louis Symphony Orchestra included the suite in a 1991 RCA Victor CD recording that also featured Piston's Three New England Sketches and Symphony No. 6.

Piston studied the twelve-tone technique of Arnold Schoenberg and wrote works using aspects of it as early as the Sonata for Flute and Piano (1930) and the First Symphony (1937). His first fully twelve-tone work was the Chromatic Study on the Name of Bach for organ (1940), which nonetheless retains a vague feeling of key. Although he employed twelve-tone elements sporadically throughout his career, these become much more pervasive in the Eighth Symphony (1965) and many of the works following it: the Variations for Cello and Orchestra (1966), Clarinet Concerto (1967), Ricercare for Orchestra, Fantasy for Violin and Orchestra (1970), and Flute Concerto (1971).

In 1943, the Alice M. Ditson Fund of Columbia University commissioned Piston's Symphony No. 2, which was premiered by the National Symphony Orchestra on March 5, 1944 and was awarded a prize by the New York Music Critics' Circle. His next symphony, the Third, earned a Pulitzer Prize, as did his Symphony No. 7. His Viola Concerto and String Quartet No. 5 also later received Critics' Circle awards.

Piston was awarded the Edward MacDowell Medal for his outstanding contribution to the arts by the MacDowell Colony in 1974.

Piston wrote four books on the technical aspects of music theory which are considered to be classics in their respective fields: Principles of Harmonic Analysis, Counterpoint, Orchestration, and Harmony. The last of these introduced for the first time in theoretical literature several important new concepts that Piston had developed in his approach to music theory, notably the concept of harmonic rhythm, and the secondary dominant. This work went through four editions in the author's lifetime, was translated into several languages, and (with changes and additions by Mark DeVoto) was still regarded as recently as 2009 as a standard harmony text.

He died at his home in Belmont, Massachusetts, on November 12, 1976.

His library and desk are permanently exhibited in the Piston Room, at the Boston Public Library.

== Works ==
=== Ballet ===
- The Incredible Flutist (1938)

=== Orchestral ===
- Symphonies
  - Symphony No. 1 (1937)
  - Symphony No. 2 (1943)
  - Symphony No. 3 (1946–47) (commissioned by the Koussevitzky Foundation)
  - Symphony No. 4 (1950) (composed for the 100th anniversary of the University of Minnesota)
  - Symphony No. 5 (1954)
  - Symphony No. 6 (1955) (composed for the 75th anniversary of the Boston Symphony Orchestra)
  - Symphony No. 7 (1960)
  - Symphony No. 8 (1965)
- Symphonic Piece (1927)
- Suite, for orchestra (1929)
- Concerto for Orchestra (1934)
- Suite from The Incredible Flutist (1940) (The suite from The Incredible Flutist was transcribed for symphonic wind ensemble by MSgt Donald Patterson and recorded by Col. Michael Colburn with "The President's Own" United States Marine Band.)
- Sinfonietta (1941)
- Fugue on a Victory Tune, for orchestra (1944)
- Variation on a Tune by Eugene Goosens (1944)
- Suite No. 2, for orchestra (1947)
- Toccata, for orchestra (1948)
- Serenata for Orchestra (1956)
- Three New England Sketches (1959)
- Symphonic Prelude (1961)
- Lincoln Center Festival Overture (1962)
- Variations on a Theme by Edward Burlingame Hill (1963)
- Pine Tree Fantasy (1965)
- Ricercare for Orchestra (1967)
- Bicentennial Fanfare, for orchestra (1975)

=== Band and brass ensemble ===
- Fanfare for the Fighting French, for brass and percussion (1942)
- Tunbridge Fair, for symphonic band (1950) (Commissioned by the American Bandmasters Association)
- Ceremonial Fanfare, for brass (1969) (Commissioned by the Metropolitan Museum of Art in New York to accompany its Centennial exhibition "The Year 1200")

=== Concertante ===
==== Flute ====
- Flute Concerto (1971)

==== Clarinet ====
- Clarinet Concerto (1967)

==== Harp ====
- Capriccio for Harp and String Orchestra (1963)

==== Piano ====
- Piano Concertino (1937)
- Concerto for Two Pianos and Orchestra (1959)

==== Violin ====
- Violin Concerto No. 1 (1939)
- Violin Concerto No. 2 (1960)
- Fantasia for Violin and Orchestra (1970)

==== Viola ====
- Viola Concerto (1957)

==== Cello ====
- Variations for Cello and Orchestra (1966)

==== Organ ====
- Prelude and Allegro for Organ and Strings (1943)

==== Other ====
- Fantasy for English Horn, Harp, and Strings (1953)
- Concerto for String Quartet, Wind Instruments and Percussion (1976)

=== Chamber/Instrumental ===
- String quartets
  - String Quartet No. 1 (1933)
  - String Quartet No. 2 (1935)
  - String Quartet No. 3 (1947)
  - String Quartet No. 4 (1951)
  - String Quartet No. 5 (1962)
- Three Pieces, for flute, clarinet, and bassoon (1925)
- Sonata for Flute and Piano (1930)
- Suite for Oboe and Piano (1931)
- Piano Trio No. 1 (1935)
- Sonata for Violin and Piano (1939)
- Sonatina for Violin and Harpsichord (1945)
- Interlude, for viola and piano (1942)
- Flute Quintet (1942)
- Partita, for violin, viola, and organ (1944)
- Divertimento, for nine instruments (1946)
- Duo for Viola and Cello (1949)
- Piano Quintet (1949)
- Wind Quintet (1956)
- Piano Quartet (1964)
- String Sextet (1964)
- Piano Trio No. 2 (1966)
- Souvenirs, for flute, viola, and harp (1967)
- Duo, for cello and piano (1972)
- Three Counterpoints, for violin, viola, and cello (1973)

=== Piano ===
- Piano Sonata (1926) [unpublished, withdrawn]
- Passacaglia (1943)
- Improvisation (1945)
- Variation on Happy Birthday (1970)

=== Organ ===
- Chromatic Study on the Name of BACH (1940)

=== Choral ===
- Carnival Song, for male chorus and brass (1938)
- March (1940)
- Psalm and Prayer of David, for mixed chorus and seven instruments (1959)
- "O sing unto the Lord a new song" (Psalm 96)
- "Bow down thine ear, O Lord" (Psalm 86)

=== Books ===
- Principles of Harmonic Analysis. Boston: E. C. Schirmer, 1933.
- Harmony. New York: W. W. Norton & Company, Inc., 1941. Reprint edition (as U.S. War Dept. Education Manual EM 601), Madison, Wisconsin: Published for the United States Armed Forces Institute by W. Norton, 1944. Revised ed, New York: W. W. Norton, 1948. Third ed., 1962. Fourth ed., revised and expanded by Mark DeVoto, 1978. ISBN 0-393-09034-5. 5th edition, revised and expanded by Mark DeVoto ISBN 0-393-95480-3. British editions, London: Victor Gollancz, 1949, rev. ed. 1950 (reprinted 1973), 1959, 3rd ed. 1970, 4th ed. 1982. Spanish translation, as Armonía, rev. y ampliada por Mark DeVoto. Barcelona: Idea Books, 2001. ISBN 84-8236-224-0 Chinese version of the 2nd edition, as 和声学 [He sheng xue], trans. Chenbao Feng and Dunxing Shen. 北京 : 人民音乐出版社 : 新华书店北京发行所发行 [Beijing: Ren min yin yue chu ban she : Xin hua shu dian Beijing fa xing suo fa xing], 1956. Revised, 北京 : 人民音乐出版社 [Beijing: Ren min yin yue chu ban she], 1978.
- Counterpoint. New York: W. W. Norton, 1947.
- Orchestration. New York: Norton, 1955. Russian translation, as 'Оркестровка', translation and notes by Constantine Ivanov. Moscow: Soviet Composer, 1990, ISBN 5-85285-014-4.

== Sources ==
- Andersen, Leslie N. (2001). "Ronell, Ann [Rosenblatt, Ann]". In Stanley Sadie; John Tyrrell (eds.). The New Grove Dictionary of Music and Musicians (2nd ed.). London: Macmillan.
- Anon. (November 2007). "Announcement of Albany Recording of Cello and Piano Duo". Records International.
- Archibald, Bruce (April 1978). "Reviews of Records: 'Walter Piston: Symphony No. 7, Symphony No. 8, Louisville Orchestra, Jorge Mester; Walter Piston: Symphony No. 5, Louisville Orchestra, Robert Whitney; Walter Piston: Concerto for Viola and Orchestra, Paul Doktor, viola, Louisville Orchestra, Robert Whitney; Walter Piston: The Incredible Flutist, Louisville Orchestra, Jorge Mester.'". The Musical Quarterly. 64 (2): 263–268. doi:10.1093/mq/lxiv.2.263. ISSN 0027-4631. JSTOR 741453.
- Carter, Elliott (July 1946). "Walter Piston". The Musical Quarterly. 32 (3): 354–375, list of works and premieres up to 1946 on pp. 374–375. doi:10.1093/mq/XXXII.3.354. ISSN 0027-4631. JSTOR 739196.
- DeVoto, Mark (1994). "Walter Piston, Practical Theorist" (PDF).
- Firmino, Érico Artioli; Bueno, José Lino Oliveira; Bigand, Emmanuel (February 2009). "Travelling Through Pitch Space Speeds up Musical Time". Music Perception. 26 (3): 205–209. doi:10.1525/mp.2009.26.3.205.
- Hudson, Edward (November 13, 1976). "Walter Piston Dies; Composer Won Two Pulitzers". The New York Times. p. 21.
- Lowe, Steven (2002). "Liner notes to Walter Piston: Symphony No. 4, Capriccio for Harp and String Orchestra, Three New England Sketches. Seattle Symphony Orchestra; Gerard Schwarz, conductor. Naxos CD 8.559162".
- Morgan, Paula (2001). "D'Accone, Frank A(Anthony)". In Stanley Sadie; John Tyrrell (eds.). The New Grove Dictionary of Music and Musicians (2nd ed.). London: Macmillan.
- Oja, Carol J. (March 29, 2011). "Walter Piston (1894–1976)" (American Symphony Orchestra program notes).
- Perlis, Vivian (2001). "Wyner, Yehudi". In Stanley Sadie; John Tyrrell (eds.). The New Grove Dictionary of Music and Musicians (2nd ed.). London: Macmillan.
- Pfitzinger, Scott (2017). Composer Genealogies: A Compendium of Composers, Their Teachers, and Their Students. New York, London: Rowman & Littlefield. ISBN 9781442272248.
- Anon. (1991). Piston: Symphony No. 6; Three New England Sketches; The Incredible Flutist (booklet). Leonard Slatkin; St. Louis Symphony Orchestra. RCA Victor. OCLC 1082363025. 60798-2-RC.
- Pollack, Howard (1982). Walter Piston. Ann Arbor, Michigan: UMI Research Press. ISBN 0-8357-1280-X.
- Pollack, Howard (Spring 1987). "Review: String Quartets, Nos. 1–5; Quintet for Flute and String Quartet by Walter Piston". American Music. 5 (1): 119–121. doi:10.2307/3051879. ISSN 0734-4392. JSTOR 3051879.
- Pollack, Howard (2001). "Piston, Walter (Hamor)". Grove Music Online., Deane Root, editor in chief. (Subscription access). Previously published in The New Grove Dictionary of Music and Musicians, 2nd edition, edited by Stanley Sadie and John Tyrrell. London: Macmillan, 2001.
- Stowell, Robin (1992). The Cambridge Companion to the Violin. Cambridge Companions to Music. Cambridge; New York: Cambridge University Press. ISBN 0-521-39923-8.
- Thompson, David (1980). A History of Harmonic Theory in the United States. Kent, Ohio: Kent State University Press.
- Thomson, Virgil (September–October 1962). "'Greatest Music Teacher' at 75". Music Educators Journal. 49 (1): 43. doi:10.2307/3389760. JSTOR 3389760. S2CID 143686296.
- Westergaard, Peter; Piston, Walter (Fall–Winter 1968). "Conversation with Walter Piston". Perspectives of New Music. 7 (1): 3–17. doi:10.2307/832423. ISSN 0031-6016. JSTOR 832423.
