= Pierre Choumoff =

Russian-French photographer (1872–1936)

- Born: 26 March 1872; Grodno, Russian Empire
- Died: 25 June 1936 (aged 64); Łódź, Poland

Pierre Choumoff (Russian: Пётр Шумов, romanized: Pyotr Shumov, French: Pierre Choumoff, Polish: Piotr Szumov; born 26 March 1872 in Grodno, Russian Empire; died 25 June 1936 in Łódź, Poland) was a Russian–French photographer and the personal photographer of Auguste Rodin.

== Life and work ==
=== Russian Empire ===
During his grammar school years, Choumoff became interested in revolutionary currents and participated in the publication of an underground newspaper. In 1891 he entered the Technical Institute in Saint Petersburg. In the 1890s he joined the Grodno revolutionary circle of Sergei Galyun, who maintained links with the Polish Second Proletariat, illegal organisations in St. Petersburg, Kiev and other cities of the Russian Empire.

Choumoff's first arrest came in the summer of 1894. He was charged with possession of illegal literature and banned from leaving Grodno for three years. However, his underground activities continued. Choumoff worked with the Russian Social Democratic Labour Party and led the Grodno organisation of the Polish Socialist Party. Afterwards he was arrested several times and had to spend four years in prison. His wife Katharina Choumoff also took part in the struggle for the overthrow of the autocracy and for the strengthening of the rights of national minorities (Belarusians and Poles).

After being arrested again in 1907, Choumoff left Russia with his wife and three-year-old daughter Maria.

=== France ===
Choumoff settled in Paris with his family. Here he sought out Jan Strożecki, a former fellow revolutionary who had come to the city a few years earlier. The former active revolutionary worked in the studio of the French photographer Felix Bonnet and invited Choumoff to become a partner. Unlike Strożeci, who experimented with photography in exile in Sakha between 1903 and 1904, photography was an unknown field for Choumoff.

Thanks to the knowledge acquired at the St. Petersburg Technical Institute and the support of colleagues, Choumoff mastered the mechanical and chemical basics of photography quite quickly. To understand the art of creating images, composition and the combination of light and shadow, Choumoff went to the cafés Café du Dôme, Le Select, and Café de la Rotonde, among others, which were popular meeting places for painters, poets and writers and thus represented a kind of centre of cultural life in early 20th century Paris. Through the contacts made in the cafés, Choumoff built up a network and opened his own studio at 5 rue du Faubourg Saint-Jacques in Montparnasse on 15 November 1911. Choumoff specialised in portrait photography and became popular among the artists of the Rive Gauche.

In 1912, Choumoff became acquainted with the sculptor Auguste Rodin. This developed into a close collaboration that lasted until the sculptor's death, and contributed significantly to the fame of the photo studio. In the years from 1912 to 1917, Choumoff created a photographic chronicle of the last years of Rodin's life and work. After the sculptor's death, Choumoff became the first photographer of the Musée Rodin, which opened in Paris in August 1919.

On 14 November 1920, Choumoff attended the celebration of Claude Monet's 80th birthday in Giverny. On this occasion, he produced a photo reportage showing the painter and his accompanying works in the intimate surroundings of the estate and gardens. Choumoff also photographed artists such as Marie-Louise Van Veen, Nina Natova, Vera Nemchinova and Nikolai Zverev. In March 1921, the publisher and art dealer Jacques Povolozky organised an exhibition of portraits by Pierre Choumoff in his gallery at 59 Rue Bonaparte 13.

=== Poland ===
The Great Depression of 1929 also affected the photo studio in Rue du Faubourg-Saint-Jacques, which was forced to close in July 1933. This was also partly due to the crisis in the photography profession caused by the popularisation of amateur photography. Choumoff moved with his wife and son to Łódź in 1935, where he resumed some of his photographic activities.

In Łódź, through his friend Aleksander Prystor, Choumoff was hired by Louis Geyer's Cotton Works as an advisor to the management.

On 25 June 1936, Pierre Choumoff died of heart failure. His funeral was attended by prominent Polish figures. He was buried in the cemetery of the Evangelical Reformed Church in Łódź.

== Exhibition participations and awards ==
In 1911, Choumoff took part in the photo exhibition du Nord de la France organised by the Amicale-Photo association, where he won second prize in the portrait category. Choumoff became internationally known in 1922 with his photograph "Portrait of Countess X", for which he received the Grand Prize of the London Photographic Salon and the "Photograph of the Year" award. He was awarded the bronze medal of the French Society of Photography for his portraits and the gold medal of the 1925 World's Fair in Paris. In 1927 and 1930 he took part in the exhibitions of the Société du Salon d'Automne (Paris Autumn Salon) and in 1932 in an exhibition at the Salon des Tuileries.
