= Violin Concerto No. 2 (Piston) =

Concerto by Walter Piston

Walter Piston's Concerto No. 2 for Violin and Orchestra was written between 1959 and 1960 on commission from the Ford Foundation and violinist Joseph Fuchs and dedicated to him. Fuchs gave the first performance on the October 28, 1960, with by the Boston Philharmonic under William Steinberg.

The work is in three movements:

1. Moderato
2. Adagio
3. Allegro

A typical performance will last around 25 minutes.
