= Fantasia for Violin and Orchestra (Piston) =

Walter Piston's Fantasia for Violin and Orchestra was commissioned in 1970 by Mario di Bonaventura, music director of the Hopkins Center Congregation of the Arts at Dartmouth College, who conducted the world premiere on March 11, 1973, performed by the Dartmouth Symphony Orchestra with Salvatore Accardo as the soloist. The commission had been made specifically for Accardo.

== Analysis ==
The work is in one movement subdivided into five sections and lasts for approximately 15 minutes. These sections are marked by changes of tempo and meter:

- Lento sereno, = 48 (5/8)
- Allegro, = 120 (3/4)
- Adagio, = 50 (6/4)
- Allegro energico, = 84 (5/8, 6/8, and 3/4)
- Lento, = 48 (5/8)
