= Symphony No. 2 (Kalinnikov) =

Symphony by Vasily Kalinnikov

- by Vasily Kalinnikov
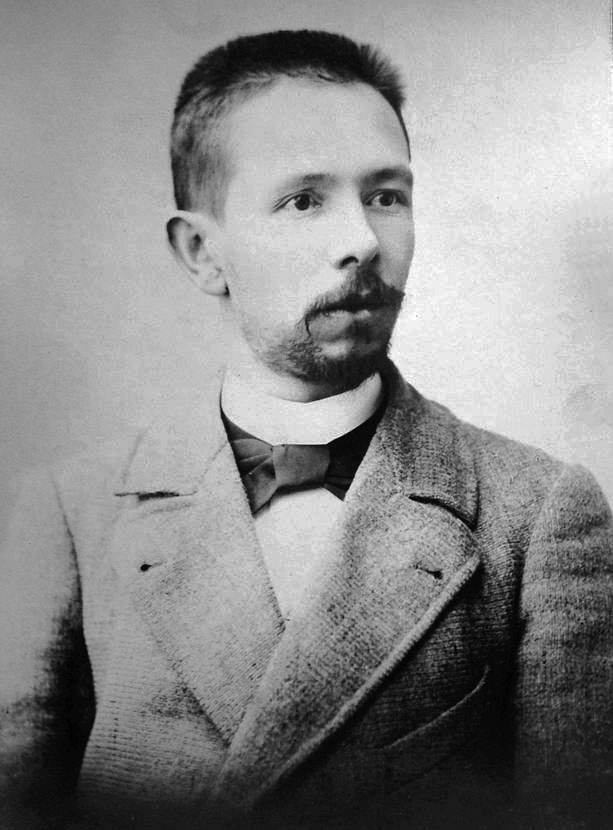
- The composer on a postcard from the 1910s
- Key: A major
- Composed: 1895–97
- Dedication: Alexander Winogradsky
- Published: 1901
- Movements: 4

The Symphony No. 2 in A major by Russian composer Vasily Kalinnikov was composed from 1895–1897 and first published in 1901. The symphony is dedicated to Alexander Winogradsky.

== Instrumentation ==
The symphony is scored for:

Woodwinds
piccolo
2 flutes
2 oboes (2nd also cor anglais)
2 clarinets (A)
2 bassoons

Brass
4 horns
2 trumpets (D)
3 trombones
tuba

Percussion
timpani

Strings
harp (second movement only)

violins I, II
violas
cellos
double basses

== Form ==
A typical performance lasts around 40 minutes. The work is in four movements:

1. Moderato – Allegro non troppo (A major)
2. Andante cantabile (F♯ minor)
3. Allegro scherzando (D major)
4. Andante cantabile – Allegro vivo (Introduction F♯ minor – F major – A major)

== See also ==
- Symphony No. 1 (Kalinnikov)
