= Three New England Sketches =

Symphonic suite by Walter Piston (1959)

Three New England Sketches by Walter Piston is a symphonic suite dating from 1959.

== History ==
The Sketches were commissioned by the Worcester County Musical Association for its 100th Annual Music Festival, and the cycle is dedicated to the conductor Paul Paray. They were composed in the summer of 1959 when Piston, as had become his habit, retreated to the Green Mountains in Vermont to work from a hilltop with a magnificent view spread out before him. While the composer did not consider it a symphony he stated that each of the three movements did conform to symphonic development and indicated that each movement represented his impressions of that aspect of the New England region. It was first performed on October 23, 1959, by the Detroit Symphony Orchestra under Paul Paray.

== Analysis ==
The work is in three movements:

1. Seaside (Adagio)
2. Summer Evening (Delicato)
3. Mountains (Maestoso; Risoluto)

A typical performance will last around 17 minutes.

While Piston disowned any specific programmatic intentions, he did not object if others made their own associations. The movement titles, he said,

were the subjects that prompted me to compose. I did not intend to openly suggest the subject matter, but a man came up to me, following the premiere, and said, "I hope you don't mind my saying that I smelled clams during the first movement." I said, "No, that is quite all right. They are your clams." Each individual is free to interpret as he wishes.

The first two movements (both of which are loose binary forms) are especially evocative with, for example, "amazingly life-like" bird and insect chirps and buzzes in "Summer Evening". The last movement, "Mountains", is—appropriate to its title—in an arched ABCBA form in which the sections are differentiated by tempo and expressive character: A is "Maestoso" and monumental, B is "Risoluto" and lively, and C is "Meno mosso" and atmospheric.
