= Prodigal Son (ballet) =

Ballet by George Balanchine to music by Sergei Prokofiev

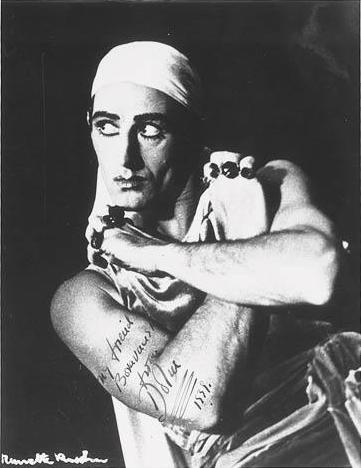
Anton Dolin in The Prodigal Son, Ballets Russes, Australian Tour, 1939

Prodigal Son, or Le Fils prodigue, Op. 46 (Russian: Блудный сын) is a ballet created for Diaghilev's Ballets Russes by George Balanchine to music by Sergei Prokofiev (1928–29). The libretto, based on the parable in the Gospel of Luke, was by Boris Kochno, who added a good deal of drama and emphasized the theme of sin and redemption ending with the Prodigal Son's return.

Susan Au writes in Ballet and Modern Dance that the ballet was the last of the Diaghilev era, choreographed the year the great impresario died. She continues: "Adapted from the biblical story, it opens with the prodigal's rebellious departure from home and his seduction by the beautiful but treacherous siren, whose followers rob him. Wretched and remorseful, he drags himself back to his forgiving father."

== History ==
Serge Lifar created the role. The premiere took place on Tuesday, May 21, 1929, at the Théâtre Sarah Bernhardt, Paris, with décor by Georges Rouault and lighting by Ronald Bates, in what was to be the Ballets Russes's last Paris season: "Balanchine's choreography upset Prokofiev, who conducted the premiere. The composer had envisioned a production that was 'real'; his concept of the Siren, whom he saw as demure, differed radically from Balanchine's. Prokofiev refused to pay Balanchine royalties for his choreography."

Balanchine's American Ballet danced Prodigal Son at its first public performance in 1934.

The New York City Ballet premiere was on Thursday, February 23, 1950, at City Center of Music and Drama, New York, the title role danced by Jerome Robbins, with lighting by Mark Stanley. Hugh Laing and Francisco Moncion also danced it before it lapsed from the performance rota for a decade. It was restaged in 1960 with Edward Villella in the title role (Villella recounts his work in recreating the role in his autobiography of the same name).

Mikhail Baryshnikov danced it with City Ballet in 1979 and Damian Woetzel danced it at his farewell performance on Wednesday, June 18, 2008.

Prokofiev used the music from the ballet to form the basis of the two versions of his Symphony No. 4 composed in 1929 and 1947, respectively.

== Cast ==
=== Premiere cast ===
- Felia Doubrovska
- Eleanora Marra
- Nathalie Branitzka
- Serge Lifar
- Michael Fedorov (Sophie Fedorova's brother)
- Léon Woizikowsky
- Anton Dolin

=== New York City Ballet revivals ===
- 2008 Winter
- 2008 Spring

- Teresa Reichlen
- Pauline Golbin
- Dena Abergel
- Daniel Ulbricht
- Ask la Cour
- Antonio Carmena
- Kyle Froman

- Maria Kowroski
- Pauline Golbin
- Dena Abergel
- Damian Woetzel (Damian Woetzel's farewell)
- Ask la Cour
- Sean Suozzi
- Adam Hendrickson

== Articles ==
- Sunday New York Times by John Martin, November 4, 1934

Obituaries

- New York Times of Felia Doubrovska by Jack Anderson, September 21, 1981

== Reviews ==
- New York Times by John Martin, February 24, 1950
- New York Times by Anna Kisselgoff, January 13, 1979
- Ballet Magazine, by Eric Taub, February–March 2004
- New York Times by Alastair Macaulay, June 10, 2008
