= Ivan Nikitin (poet) =

Russian poet

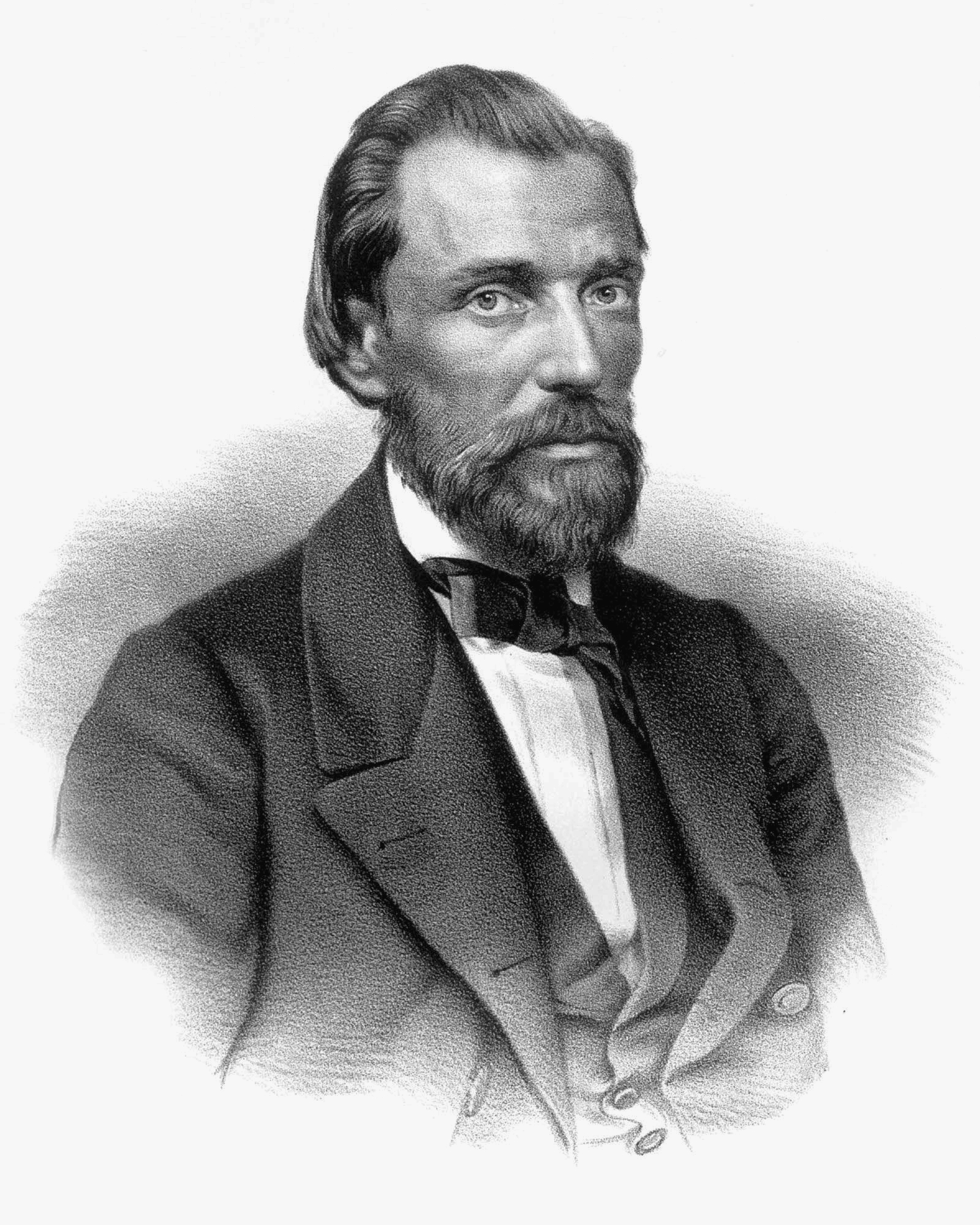
Ivan Nikitin

Ivan Savvich Nikitin (Russian: Ива́н Са́ввич Ники́тин) (3 October 1824 [O.S. 21 September], Voronezh – 28 October 1861 [O.S. 16 October], Voronezh) was a Russian poet.

Born in Voronezh into a merchant family, Nikitin was educated in a seminary until 1843. His father's violence and alcoholism brought the family to ruin and forced young Ivan to provide for the household by becoming an innkeeper. After his first publications, he joined a circle of local intelligentsia that included his future biographer (and the editor of his collected works) Mikhail De-Poulet. He taught himself French and German and read widely in world literature, and in 1859 he opened a bookstore and library that became an important center of literary and social life in Voronezh.

His first poems appeared in 1849 and his first collection in 1856; his 1858 poem "Kulak" was his most successful with both critics and the public. A second collection came out in 1859, and a prose "Seminarist's Diary" was published in 1861. Some of his poems became the basis for popular songs, set to music by such composers as Vasily Kalinnikov, Eduard Nápravník, and Nikolai Rimsky-Korsakov. D. S. Mirsky wrote that his "principal claim to attention" was in "his realistic poems of the life of the poor":

He was inclined sometimes to idealize and sentimentalize them, but his best things are free from this sin. There is an almost epic calm in the long, uneventful, and powerful Night Rest of the Drivers, and an unsweetened realism in such poems of tragic misery as The Tailor. In Kulák, his opus magnum, Nikitin introduced into poetry the methods of realistic prose. He succeeds in evoking pity and terror by the simple account of sordid and trivial misery. But he was not strong enough to create a really new art or a really new attitude to poetry.

Nikita Khrushchev was extremely fond of Nikitin's verse.
