= Symphony No. 6 (Piston) =

The Symphony No. 6 by Walter Piston was completed in 1955.

Piston composed the symphony to mark the 75th Anniversary of the Boston Symphony Orchestra. He dedicated the score to the memory of Serge Koussevitzky and his wife Natalie. The symphony was first performed by the Boston Symphony Orchestra under Charles Munch, on November 25, 1955.

== Analysis ==
The work, like the earlier Symphony No. 3 and Symphony No. 4, is in four movements:

1. Fluendo espressivo
2. Scherzo: Leggerissimo vivace
3. Adagio sereno
4. Allegro energico

A typical performance will last around 25 minutes.

The symphony opens with a smooth sonata-allegro movement in A minor that gives the effect of a single flowing gesture. Both main themes are in 3/4 time, with the first unfolding in the violins and the second passed around the woodwinds. In the recapitulation, the return of the first theme is delayed until the very end of the movement.

The second movement is a scherzo. It is unusual in Piston's output both for harmonic novelty and an adventurous approach to orchestration. The percussion section is prominent throughout the movement, and the pizzicato muted strings playing in parallel seconds add another percussive layer, woven together with pianissimo scurrying chromatic lines.

The third movement, Adagio sereno, is in five-part rondo form: ABABA. The A theme is first presented by the solo cello. The second time A occurs, this theme is embellished, and the final A powerfully recapitulates it in the full orchestra. The B theme is contrasting and more delicate. Near the end of the movement the solo cello returns to play the well-known BACH motif, B♭–A–C–B♮—the four notes which, in a different order, had begun the first movement.

The finale is heavily scored but gives the illusion of lightness and transparency. It is a sectional form in A major, with well-defined, extroverted themes.

The first and third movements, as well as the second and fourth, are paired through the use of mode (minor in the first and third, major in the second and fourth), motives (broadly lyrical vs. brightly syncopated), form, color, and mood, and a satisfying, balanced whole is achieved in this way, along with the key scheme of the four movements: A minor, D major, F♯ minor, and A major.
