= Symphony No. 4 (Piston) =

The Symphony No. 4 by Walter Piston is a symphony dating from 1950. Piston composed his Fourth Symphony on commission from the University of Minnesota to mark the centennial of the university's foundation in the following year. The symphony was first performed by the Minneapolis Symphony Orchestra under Antal Doráti on 30 March 1951.

== Analysis ==
This work, like the earlier Third and later Sixth Symphonies, is in four movements:

1. Piacevole (𝅗𝅥 = 84)
2. Ballando (♩ = 132)
3. Contemplativo (♪ = 92)
4. Energico (♩. = 120)

A typical performance will last around 25 minutes.

The first movement begins with a flowing, two-octave melody in the violins, countered by a chromatic theme in the clarinet. The second movement is a "dancing" movement in rondo form, featuring irregular meters (3/4, 7/8, 5/8, 2/4, etc.), alternating with a 6/8 waltz and a vigorous theme "reminiscent of country fiddling". The contemplative grows from an almost completely atonal opening theme into an explosive climax. The finale is in sonata form, with the first theme strongly rhythmic, and the second (in the oboe) more cantabile. The development section is short, and leads through a return of the second theme in the violins to an exuberant ending built on the first theme.

== Instrumentation ==
The symphony is scored for an orchestra with the following instrumentation:

Woodwinds

1 piccolo
2 flutes
2 oboes
1 English horn
2 clarinets in B♭
1 bass clarinet
2 bassoons
1 contrabassoon

Brass

4 horns in F
3 trumpets in C
3 trombones
1 tuba

Percussion

timpani

triangle
wood block
snare drum
cymbals
bass drum

Strings

2 harps

violins I
violins II
violas
cellos
double basses
