= Vladimir Shcherbachov =

Soviet composer

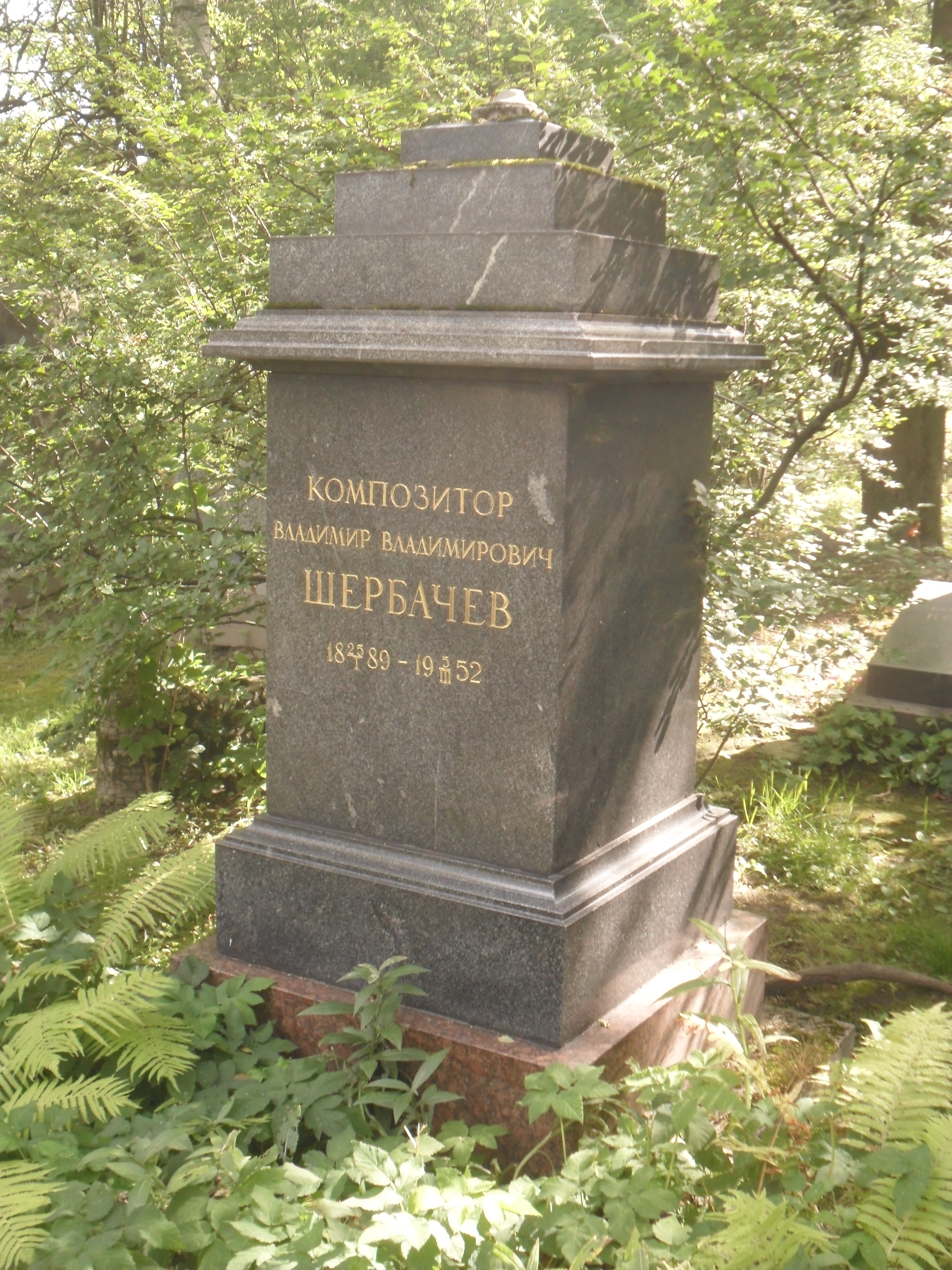
The grave of Vladimir Shcherbachov

Vladimir Vladimirovich Shcherbachov (Shcherbachyov, Shcherbachev) (Russian: Влади́мир Влади́мирович Щербачёв; 25 January 1889, in Warsaw – 5 March 1952, in Leningrad) was a Soviet composer.

He studied with Maximilian Steinberg, Anatoly Lyadov, and Jāzeps Vītols (Joseph Wihtol) at the St. Petersburg Conservatory from 1908 to 1914. While there he also worked as a pianist for Sergey Diaghilev and taught theory. He served in World War I and then worked in Soviet government music positions. In 1918-1923 he worked as a lecturer and ran the musical department of the Narkompros. He later became a professor at the Leningrad Conservatory (1923-1931 and 1944-1948) and the Tbilisi Conservatory. He counted Boris Arapov, Vasily Velikanov, Evgeny Mravinsky, Valery Zhelobinsky, Gavriil Popov, Valerian Bogdanov-Berezovsky, Pyotr Ryazanov, and Mikhail Chulaki among his pupils, as well as various others.

== Works ==
- Anna Kolossova, opera (1939, unfinished);
- Tabachny Kapitan, operetta (1943);
- Five symphonies:
  - No. 1 (1914);
  - No. 2 ("Blokovskaya” or "Blok", with soloists and chorus, 1925);
  - No. 3 (Symphony-Suite, 1931);
  - No. 4 ("Izhorskaya", with soloists and chorus, 1935);
  - No. 5 ("Russkaya", 1948, 2nd version in 1950);
- Nonet for 7 instruments, voice and dancer (1919);
- Suite for string quartet (1939) and other chamber music;
- Two piano sonatas and other piano works;
- Various Romances;
- Film music:
  - The Thunderstorm (after Aleksandr Ostrovsky, 1934);
  - Peter I (1937–1939);
  - Polkovodets Suvorov (1941);
- Two Suites:
  - The Thunderstorm;
  - Peter I.
