= Valery Zhelobinsky =

Russian composer

Valery Viktorovich Zhelobinsky (Russian: Bалерий Bикторович Желобинский; November 9, 1913, Tambov – August 13, 1946, Leningrad) was a Soviet and Russian composer, pianist and pedagogue.

== Life and works ==
Zhelobinsky studied music firstly at Tambov and then from 1928 to 1932 at the Leningrad Conservatory with Vladimir Shcherbachov. He performed across the Soviet Union as a soloist. He returned to Tambov in 1942 where he taught at the College of Music and was Chairman of the Composers' Union.

For his short career, Zhelobinsky's output was large. His four operas, which include The Peasant of Komarino (Комаринский мужик), produced in Leningrad in 1933, and Mother (Мать, 1939, based on the novel by Maxim Gorky), were well received. He also wrote orchestral music including six symphonies, and three piano concertos. His Romantic Poem for violin and orchestra was premiered in Leningrad together with the first performance of Dmitri Shostakovich's Sixth Symphony in November 1939.

From his numerous piano works, the 'Six short études' were introduced to the United States by Vladimir Horowitz and were published there in 1946. Two of these études were recorded by Oscar Levant. In addition, a selection from his opera Mother ("Hobo Song" ) was also recorded in 1946 for the Victor Records label (# 26-5037, 1946) in the United States featuring the vocalist Sidor Belarsky, the orchestral accordionist John Serry and the Mischa Borr Orchestra conducted by Mischa Borr.

Shostakovich thought highly of Zhelobinsky, and argued in a 1951 letter to Mikhail Chulaki, secretary of the Union of Soviet Composers, that he should be included in a proposed list of 100 Russian composers, pointing out that 'dying at a very young stage of [his] development, [he] never reached the peak of [his] composing talents'.

== Selected Compositions (Incomplete) ==
=== Symphonic Music ===
- Symphony No. 1 in B Minor, Op. 17 "Dramatic" (1932–36)
- Symphony No. 2, Op. 28 (1939)
- Symphony No. 3 in D Major, Op. 34, "Lyric" (1940–41)

=== Concertante ===
- "Small" Piano Concerto, Op. 21 (1933–34)
- Violin Concerto in C Major, Op. 25 (1934–35)

=== Chamber works ===
- Chamber Symphony (Dectet) (1930)
- "Mourning Song" for Cello and Piano, Op. 27(bis) No. 7 (1934)
- String Quartet, Op. 42 (1943)
- "Little" Quartet for Woodwinds (1946, incomplete)

=== Operas ===
- Kamarinsky Muzhik (Камаринский мужик), Op. 18 (1933)
- Name Day / Imeniny (Именины), Op. 22 (1934–35)
- Mother (Мать), Op. 31 (1939)

=== Solo Piano ===
- Two Pieces, Op. 6 (1930)
  - No. 1: Nocturne
  - No. 2: Ostinato
- Six Short Etudes, Op. 19 (1933)
- 24 Preludes, Op. 20 (1934)
- Three Pieces, Op. 27 (1935)
- Childhood Scenes (Book I), Op. 32 (1939)
- 12 Songs Without Words, Op. 35
- Childhood Scenes (Book II) (1945)
- Two Pieces (Without Opus)

== Sources ==
- Grove's Dictionary of Music and Musicians, Zhelobinsky, Valery Viktorovich.
- Ernő Balogh, Introduction to Six Short Etudes by Valarie Jelobinsky, New York, 1946.
- Nicolas Slonimsky, Soviet Music and Musicians, in 'Slavonic and East European Review', vol. 22 (December 1944)
- Dmitri Shostakovich, ed. I. A. Bobikina, Dmitri Shostakovich v pis'makh i dokumentakh, Moscow 2000. ISBN 978-5-87579-029-4. OCLC 50387438.
