= Leopold Stokowski =

British conductor (1882–1977)

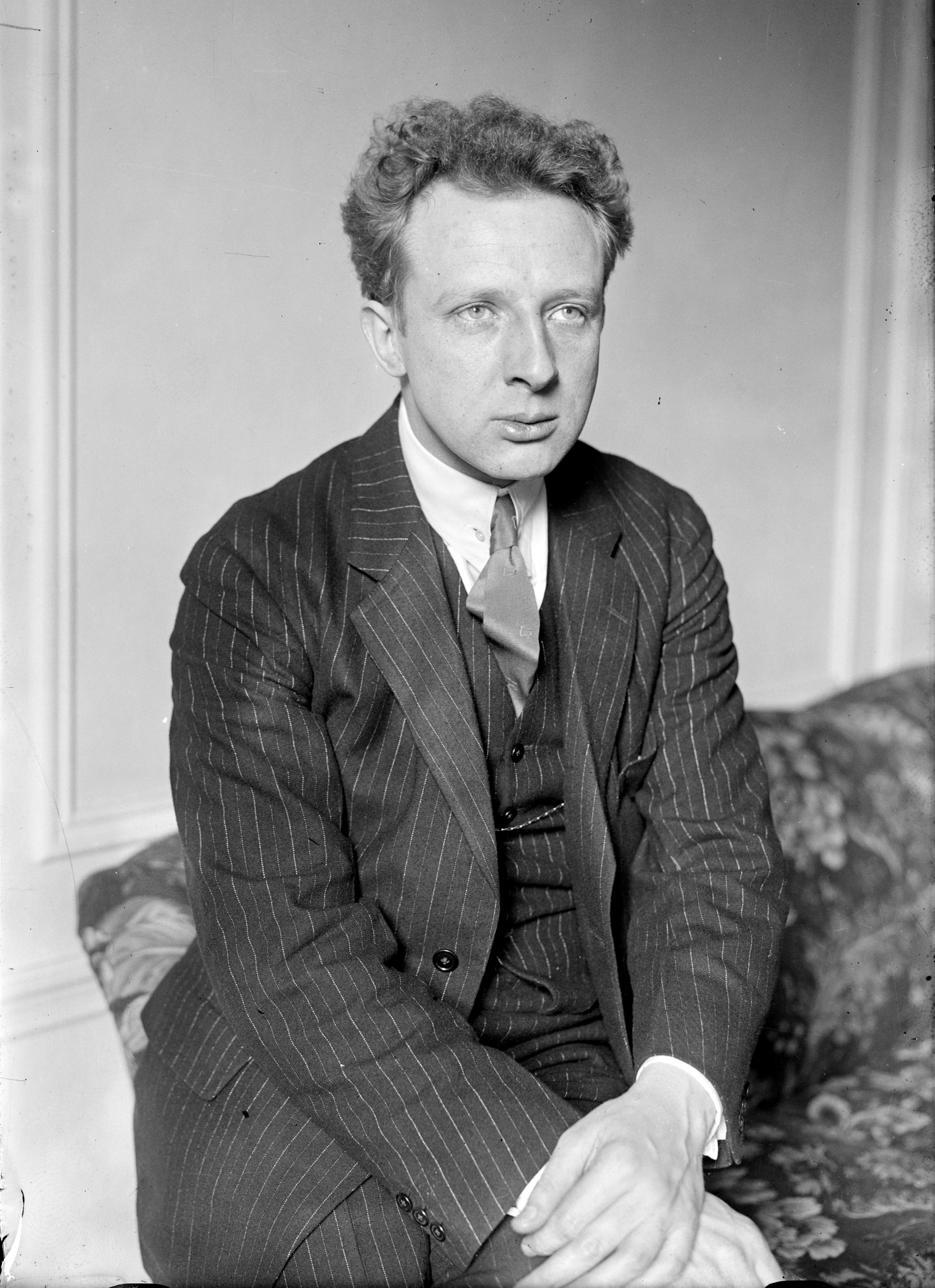
- Born: Leopold Anthony Stokowski; 18 April 1882; Marylebone, Middlesex, England
- Died: 13 September 1977 (aged 95); Nether Wallop, Hampshire, England
- Burial place: East Finchley Cemetery
- Occupations: Conductor; composer; organist
- Years active: 1905–1977
- Known for: Music director of the Philadelphia Orchestra; Founder of the Hollywood Bowl Symphony Orchestra and the American Symphony Orchestra
- Spouses: Olga Samaroff (m. 1911; div. 1923) Evangeline Johnson (m. 1926; div. 1937) Gloria Vanderbilt (m. 1945; div. 1955)
- Children: 5

Leopold Anthony Stokowski (UK: /stəˈkɒfski/ stə-KOF-skee, US: /stəˈkɔːfski, stəˈkaʊski/ stə-KAWF-skee, stə-KOW-skee; 18 April 1882 – 13 September 1977) was a British conductor. One of the leading conductors of the early and mid-20th century, he is best known for his long association with the Philadelphia Orchestra. He was especially noted for his free-hand conducting style that spurned the traditional baton and for obtaining a characteristic sound from the orchestras he directed.

Stokowski was music director of the Cincinnati Symphony Orchestra, the Philadelphia Orchestra, the NBC Symphony Orchestra, New York Philharmonic Orchestra, the Houston Symphony Orchestra, the Symphony of the Air and many others. He was also the founder of the All-American Youth Orchestra, the New York City Symphony, the Hollywood Bowl Symphony Orchestra and the American Symphony Orchestra.

Stokowski conducted the music for and appeared in several Hollywood films, including Disney's Fantasia, and was a lifelong champion of composers, giving many premieres of new music during his 60-year conducting career. He was well known for his orchestral arrangements of Johann Sebastian Bach. Stokowski, who made his official conducting debut in 1909, appeared in public for the last time in 1975 but continued making recordings until June 1977, a few months before his death at the age of 95.

== Early life and education ==
Leopold Anthony Stokowski was the son of an English-born cabinet-maker of Polish heritage, Kopernik Joseph Boleslaw Stokowski, and his Irish-born wife Annie-Marion (née Moore). Stokowski's birth certificate gives his birth on 18 April 1882, at 13 Upper Marylebone Street (now New Cavendish Street), in the Marylebone district of London. Stokowski was named after his Polish-born grandfather Leopold, who died in the Bethlem Hospital, Southwark, London, on 13 January 1879, at the age of 49. Stokowski was the Polonised Lithuanian family name, originally Stokauskas, where stoka means "lack" or "shortage".

On occasion in later life he altered his middle name to Antoni, in the Polish spelling. Compounding this, there were various rumours and inaccurate entries in otherwise authoritative reference works concerning his name. In Germany there was a rumour that his original name was simply Stock (German for stick). After he had achieved international fame with the Philadelphia Orchestra, unsubstantiated rumours circulated that he was born Leonard or Lionel Stokes or that he had "anglicised" it to "Stokes". The 5th Edition of Grove's Dictionary of Music and Musicians (1954) rendered his given names as Leopold Antoni Stanisław Bołesławowicz. These claims are readily disproved by reference not only to his birth certificate and those of his father, his younger brother and his sister, but also by the student entry registers of the Royal College of Music, the Royal College of Organists and The Queen's College, Oxford, along with surviving documents from his days at St Marylebone Church, St James's Church and St. Bartholomew's in New York City.

There is some mystery surrounding his early life. For example, he spoke with an unusual, non-British accent, though he was born and raised in London. On occasion, he gave his year of birth as 1887 instead of 1882, as in a letter to the Hugo Riemann Musiklexicon in 1950, which also incorrectly gave his birthplace as Kraków. Nicolas Slonimsky, editor of Baker's Biographical Dictionary of Musicians, received a letter from a Finnish encyclopaedia editor that said: "The Maestro himself told me that he was born in Pomerania, Germany, in 1889."

The mystery surrounding his origins and accent is clarified in Oliver Daniel's biography Stokowski – A Counterpoint of View (1982), in which (in Chapter 12) Daniel reveals that Stokowski came under the influence of his first wife Olga Samaroff, an American pianist born Lucy Mary Agnes Hickenlooper. She was from Galveston, Texas, and adopted a more exotic-sounding name to further her career. She "urged him to emphasize only the Polish part of his background" for professional and career reasons once he became a resident of the United States.

He studied at the Royal College of Music, where he first enrolled in 1896 at the age of thirteen, making him one of the youngest students to do so. In his later life in the United States Stokowski conducted six of the nine symphonies composed by his fellow organ student Ralph Vaughan Williams. Stokowski sang in the choir of the St Marylebone Parish Church, and later became assistant organist to Sir Walford Davies at the Temple Church. By the age of 16 Stokowski had been elected to membership of the Royal College of Organists. In 1900 he formed the choir of St Mary's Church, Charing Cross Road, where he trained the choirboys and played the organ. In 1902 he was appointed organist and choir director of St James's Church, Piccadilly. He also attended The Queen's College, Oxford, where he received the degree of Bachelor of Music in 1903.

== Career ==
=== New York, Paris, and Cincinnati ===
In 1905 Stokowski began work in New York City as the organist and choir director of St. Bartholomew's Church. He was very popular among the parishioners, who included members of the Vanderbilt family, but in the course of time he resigned this position to pursue a career as an orchestra conductor. Stokowski moved to Paris for additional studies in conducting. There he heard that the Cincinnati Symphony Orchestra would be needing a new conductor when it returned from a long sabbatical. In 1908 Stokowski began a campaign to win this position, writing letters to Mrs. Christian R. Holmes, the orchestra's president, and travelling to Cincinnati, Ohio, for a personal interview.

Stokowski was selected over other applicants and took up his conducting duties in late 1909. That was also the year of his official conducting debut in Paris with the Colonne Orchestra, on 12 May 1909, when he accompanied his future wife, the pianist Olga Samaroff, in Tchaikovsky's Piano Concerto No. 1. Stokowski's conducting debut in London took place the following week, on 18 May, with the New Symphony Orchestra at the Queen's Hall.

His engagement as new permanent conductor in Cincinnati was a great success. He introduced the concept of "pops concerts" and, starting with his first season, he began championing the work of living composers. His concerts included performances of music by Richard Strauss, Sibelius, Rachmaninoff, Debussy, Glazunov, Saint-Saëns and many others. He conducted the American premieres of new works by such composers as Elgar, whose 2nd Symphony was first presented there on 24 November 1911. He was to maintain his advocacy of contemporary music to the end of his career. However, in early 1912 Stokowski became frustrated with the policies of the orchestra's board of directors, and submitted his resignation. There was some dispute over whether to accept this or not, but on 12 April 1912 the board decided to do so.

=== Philadelphia Orchestra ===
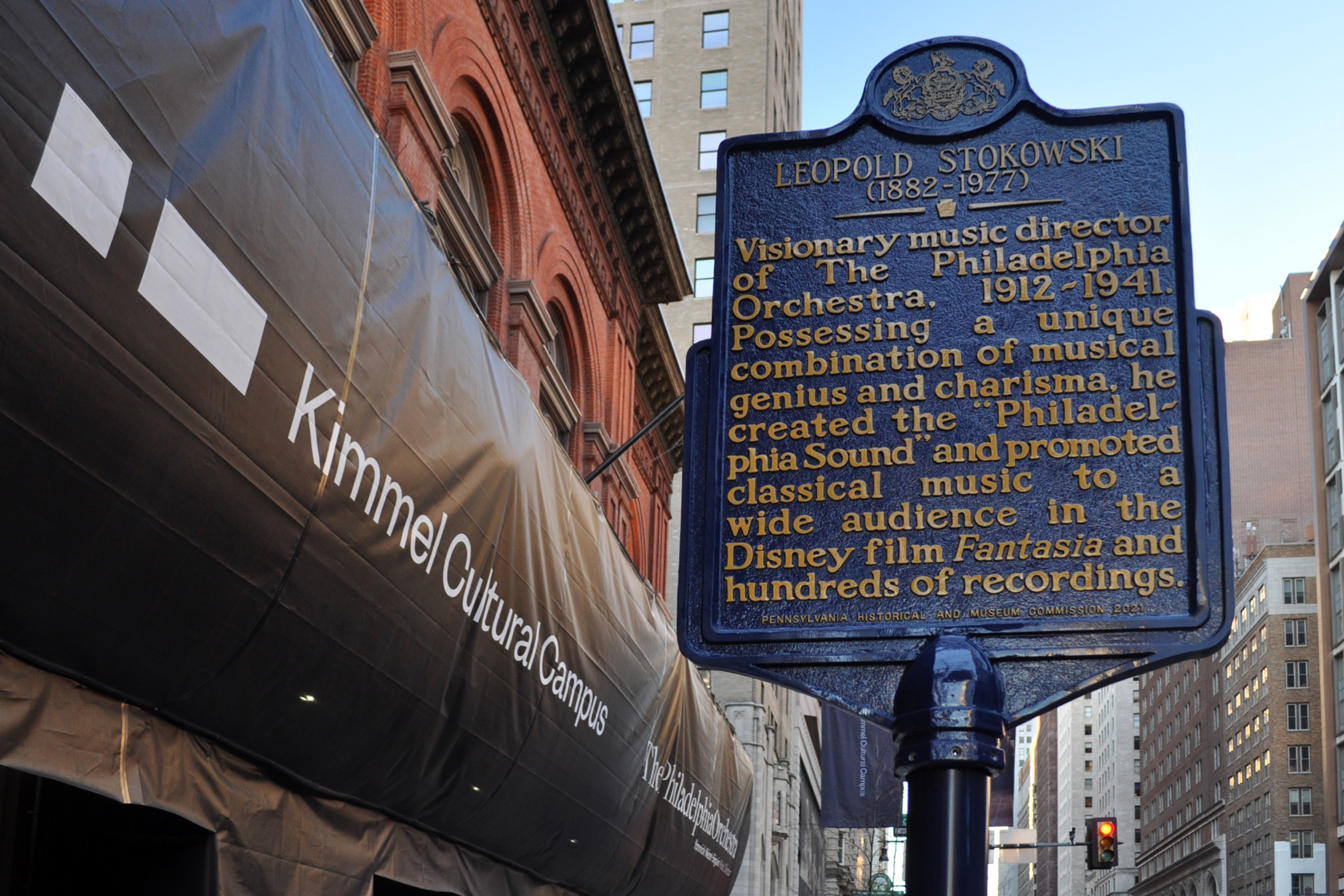
Leopold Stokowski historical marker at 240 S. Broad St., Philadelphia

Two months later, Stokowski was appointed the director of the Philadelphia Orchestra, and he made his conducting debut in Philadelphia on 11 October 1912. This position would bring him some of his greatest accomplishments and recognition. It has been suggested that Stokowski resigned abruptly at Cincinnati with the hidden knowledge that the conducting position in Philadelphia was his when he wanted it, or as Oscar Levant suggested in his book A Smattering of Ignorance, "he had the contract in his back pocket." Before Stokowski moved into his conducting position in Philadelphia, however, he returned to England to conduct two concerts at the Queen's Hall in London. On 22 May 1912, Stokowski conducted the London Symphony Orchestra in a concert that he was to repeat in its entirety 60 years later at the age of 90, and on 14 June 1912, he conducted an all-Wagner concert that featured the noted soprano Lillian Nordica. While he was director of the Philadelphia Orchestra, he was largely responsible for convincing Mary Louise Curtis Bok to set up the Curtis Institute of Music (13 October 1924) in Philadelphia. He helped with recruiting faculty and hired many of their graduates.

Toccata and Fugue in D minor
Part 1 (4:29)

Part 2 (4:24)
Piece by Johann Sebastian Bach, both parts performed in 1928 by the Philadelphia Orchestra under the direction of Leopold Stokowski

Stokowski rapidly gained a reputation as a musical showman. His flair for the theatrical included grand gestures, such as throwing the sheet music on the floor to show he did not need to conduct from a score. He also experimented with new lighting arrangements in the concert hall, at one point conducting in a dark hall with only his head and hands lighted, at other times arranging the lights so they would cast theatrical shadows of his head and hands. Late in the 1929–1930 symphony season, Stokowski started conducting without a baton. His free-hand manner of conducting soon became one of his trademarks. On the musical side, Stokowski nurtured the orchestra and shaped the "Stokowski" sound, or what became known as the "Philadelphia Sound". He encouraged "free bowing" from the string section, "free breathing" from the brass section, and continually altered the seating arrangements of the orchestra's sections, as well as the acoustics of the hall, in response to his urge to create a better sound. Stokowski is credited as the first conductor to adopt the seating plan that is used by most orchestras today, with first and second violins together on the conductor's left, and the violas and cellos to the right.

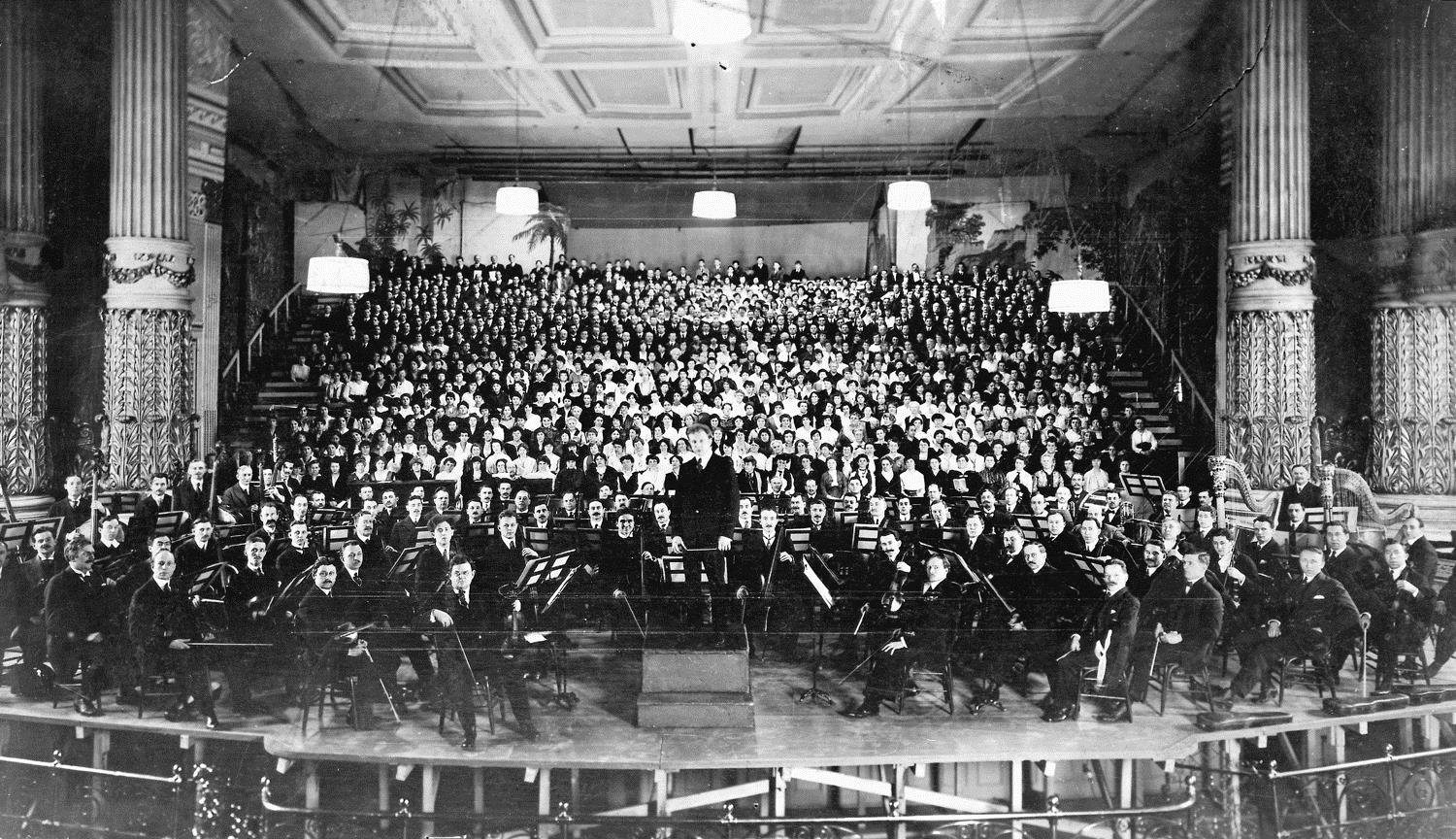
Stokowski and the Philadelphia Orchestra at 2 March 1916 American premiere of Mahler's 8th Symphony

Stokowski also became known for modifying the orchestrations of some of the works that he conducted, as was a standard practice for conductors prior to the second half of the 20th century. Among others, he amended the orchestrations of Beethoven, Tchaikovsky, Sibelius, Johann Sebastian Bach, and Brahms. For example, Stokowski revised the ending of the Romeo and Juliet Fantasy Overture, by Tchaikovsky, so it would close quietly, taking his notion from Modest Tchaikovsky's Life and Letters of Peter Ilych Tchaikovsky (translated by Rosa Newmarch: 1906) that the composer had provided a quiet ending of his own at Balakirev's suggestion. Stokowski made his own orchestration of Mussorgsky's Night on Bald Mountain by adapting Rimsky-Korsakov's orchestration and making it sound, in some places, similar to Mussorgsky's original. In the film Fantasia, to conform to the Disney artists' story-line, depicting the battle between good and evil, the ending of Night on Bald Mountain segued into the beginning of Schubert's Ave Maria.

Many music critics have taken exception to the liberties Stokowski took—liberties which were common in the nineteenth century, but had mostly died out in the twentieth, when faithful adherence to the composer's scores became more common.

External audio
- Listen to Leopold Stokowski conducting Sergei Rachmaninoff's Rhapsody on a Theme by Paganini with the Philadelphia Orchestra and Sergei Rachmaninoff in 1934 at archive.org

Stokowski's repertoire was broad and included many contemporary works. He was the only conductor to perform all of Arnold Schoenberg's orchestral works during the composer's own lifetime, several of which were world premieres. Stokowski gave the first American performance of Schoenberg's Gurre-Lieder in 1932. It was recorded "live" on 78 rpm records and remained the only recording of this work in the catalogue until the advent of the LP Record. Stokowski also presented the American premieres of four of Dmitri Shostakovich's symphonies, Numbers 1, 3, 6, and 11. In 1916, Stokowski conducted the American premiere of Mahler's 8th Symphony, Symphony of a Thousand, whose premiere he had attended in Munich on 12 September 1910. He added works by Rachmaninoff to his repertoire, giving the world premieres of his Fourth Piano Concerto, the Three Russian Songs, the Third Symphony, and the Rhapsody on a Theme of Paganini; Sibelius, whose last three symphonies were given their American premieres in Philadelphia in the 1920s; and Igor Stravinsky, many of whose works were also given their first American performances by Stokowski. In 1922, he introduced Stravinsky's score for the ballet The Rite of Spring to America, gave its first staged performance there in 1930 with Martha Graham dancing the part of The Chosen One, and at the same time made the first American recording of the work.

Seldom an opera conductor, Stokowski did give the American premieres in Philadelphia of the original version of Mussorgky's Boris Godunov (1929) and Alban Berg's Wozzeck (1931). Works by such composers as Arthur Bliss, Max Bruch, Ferruccio Busoni, Julian Carrillo, Carlos Chávez, Aaron Copland, George Enescu, Manuel de Falla, Paul Hindemith, Gustav Holst, Gian Francesco Malipiero, Nikolai Myaskovsky, Walter Piston, Francis Poulenc, Sergei Prokofiev, Maurice Ravel, Ottorino Respighi, Albert Roussel, Alexander Scriabin, Elie Siegmeister, Karol Szymanowski, Edgard Varèse, Heitor Villa-Lobos, Anton Webern, and Kurt Weill, received their American premieres under Stokowski's direction in Philadelphia. In 1933, he started "Youth Concerts" for younger audiences, which are still a tradition in Philadelphia and many other American cities, and fostered youth music programs. After disputes with the board, Stokowski began to withdraw from involvement in the Philadelphia Orchestra from 1936 onwards, allowing his co-conductor Eugene Ormandy to gradually take over. Stokowski shared principal conducting duties with Ormandy from 1936 to 1941; Stokowski did not appear with the Philadelphia Orchestra from the closing concert of the 1940–41 season (a lacklustre performance of Bach's St. Matthew Passion) until 12 February 1960, when he guest-conducted the Philadelphia in works of Mozart, Falla, Respighi, and in a legendary performance of the Shostakovich Fifth Symphony, arguably the greatest by Stokowski. The recording of this concert's broadcast had been circulated privately among collectors over the years, though never issued commercially, but with the copyright expiring at the start of 2011, it was released in its entirety on the Pristine Classical label.

Stokowski appeared as himself in the motion picture The Big Broadcast of 1937, conducting two of his Bach transcriptions. That same year he also conducted and acted in One Hundred Men and a Girl, with Deanna Durbin and Adolphe Menjou. In 1939, Stokowski collaborated with Walt Disney to create the motion picture for which he is best known: Fantasia. He conducted all the music (with the exception of a "jam session" in the middle of the film) and included his own orchestrations for Bach's Toccata and Fugue in D minor and Mussorgsky's/Schubert's Night on Bald Mountain/Ave Maria. Stokowski even got to talk to (and shake hands with) Mickey Mouse on screen, in a famous silhouette footage; though, he would later say with a smile that Mickey Mouse got to shake hands with him.

An ardent fan of the newest techniques in recording, Stokowski saw to it that most of the music for Fantasia was recorded over Class A telephone lines laid down between the Academy of Music in Philadelphia and Bell Laboratories in Camden NJ, using an early, highly complex version of multi-track stereophonic sound, dubbed Fantasound, which shared many attributes with the later Perspecta stereophonic sound system. Recorded on photographic film, the only suitable medium then available, the results were considered astounding for the latter half of the 1930s.

Upon his return in 1960, Stokowski appeared with the Philadelphia Orchestra as a guest conductor. He also made two LP recordings with them for Columbia Records, one including a performance of Manuel de Falla's El amor brujo, which he had introduced to America in 1922 and had previously recorded for RCA Victor with the Hollywood Bowl Symphony Orchestra in 1946, and a Bach album which featured the 5th Brandenburg Concerto and three of his own Bach transcriptions. He continued to appear as a guest conductor on several more occasions, his final Philadelphia Orchestra concert taking place in 1969.

In honour of Stokowski's vast influence on music and the Philadelphia performing arts community, on 24 February 1969, he was awarded the prestigious University of Pennsylvania Glee Club Award of Merit. Beginning in 1964, this award was "established to bring a declaration of appreciation to an individual each year that has made a significant contribution to the world of music and helped to create a climate in which our talents may find valid expression."

=== All-American Youth Orchestra ===
With his Philadelphia Orchestra contract having expired in 1940, Stokowski immediately formed the All-American Youth Orchestra, its players' ages ranging from 18 to 25. It toured South America in 1940 and North America in 1941 and was met with rave reviews. Although Stokowski made a number of recordings with the AAYO for Columbia, the technical standard was not as high as had been achieved with the Philadelphia Orchestra for RCA Victor. In any event, the AAYO was disbanded when America entered the Second World War, and plans for another extensive tour in 1942 were abandoned.

=== NBC Symphony Orchestra ===
During this time, Stokowski also became chief conductor of the NBC Symphony Orchestra on a three-year contract (1941–1944). Arturo Toscanini, the NBC Symphony's regular conductor, did not wish to undertake the 1941–42 NBC season due to friction with NBC management, though he did continue to lead the NBC Symphony in war bond concerts and accepted guest engagements with the Philadelphia Orchestra. Stokowski conducted a great deal of contemporary music with the NBC Symphony, including the US premiere of Prokofiev's Alexander Nevsky in 1943, the world premieres of Schoenberg's Piano Concerto (with Eduard Steuermann) and George Antheil's 4th Symphony, both in 1944, and new works by Alan Hovhaness, Stravinsky, Hindemith, Milhaud, Howard Hanson, William Schuman, Morton Gould and many others. He also conducted several British works with this orchestra, including Vaughan Williams' 4th Symphony, Holst's The Planets, and George Butterworth's A Shropshire Lad. Stokowski also made a number of recordings with the NBC Symphony for RCA Victor in 1941–42, including Tchaikovsky's 4th Symphony, a work which was never in Toscanini's repertoire, and Stravinsky's Firebird Suite. Toscanini returned to the NBC Symphony in 1942; he and Stokowski shared conducting duties for the remaining two years of Stokowski's contract.

=== New York City Symphony Orchestra ===
In 1944, on the recommendation of Mayor Fiorello La Guardia, Stokowski helped form the New York City Symphony Orchestra, which they intended would make music accessible for middle-class workers. Ticket prices were set low, and performances took place at convenient, after-work hours. Many early concerts were standing room only; however, a year later in 1945, Stokowski was at odds with the board (who wanted to trim expenses even further) and he resigned. Stokowski made three 78 pm sets with the New York City Symphony for RCA Victor: Beethoven's 6th Symphony, Richard Strauss's Death and Transfiguration, and a selection of orchestral music from Georges Bizet's Carmen.

External audio
- Listen to Leopold Stokowski conducting his orchestral transcriptions of works by Johann Sebastian Bach with the Philadelphia Orchestra in 1931–1941 at archive.org

=== Hollywood Bowl Symphony Orchestra ===
In 1945, he founded the Hollywood Bowl Symphony Orchestra. The orchestra lasted for two years before it was disbanded for live concerts, but not for recordings, which continued well into the 1960s. Stokowski's own recordings (made in 1945–46) included Brahms's 1st Symphony, Tchaikovsky's Pathetique Symphony and a number of short popular pieces. Some of Stokowski's open-air HBSO concerts were broadcast and recorded, and have been issued on CD, including a collaboration with Percy Grainger on Edvard Grieg's Piano Concerto in A minor in the summer of 1945. He premiered "From A Moonlit Ceremony" (Moonlit Peace) by George Frederick McKay in 1946 with Hollywood Bowl Symphony Orchestra. (It began giving live concerts again as the "Hollywood Bowl Orchestra" in 1991, under John Mauceri). There was a 1949 cartoon spoof of Stokowski at the Bowl with Bugs Bunny playing the conductor in "Long-Haired Hare" by Chuck Jones.

=== New York Philharmonic ===
He continued to appear frequently with the Los Angeles Philharmonic, both at the Hollywood Bowl and other venues. Then in 1946 Stokowski became a chief guest conductor of the New York Philharmonic. His many first performances with them included the US premiere of Prokofiev's 6th Symphony in 1949. He also made many recordings with the NYPO for Columbia, including the world premiere recordings of Vaughan Williams's 6th Symphony and Olivier Messiaen's L'Ascension, also in 1949.

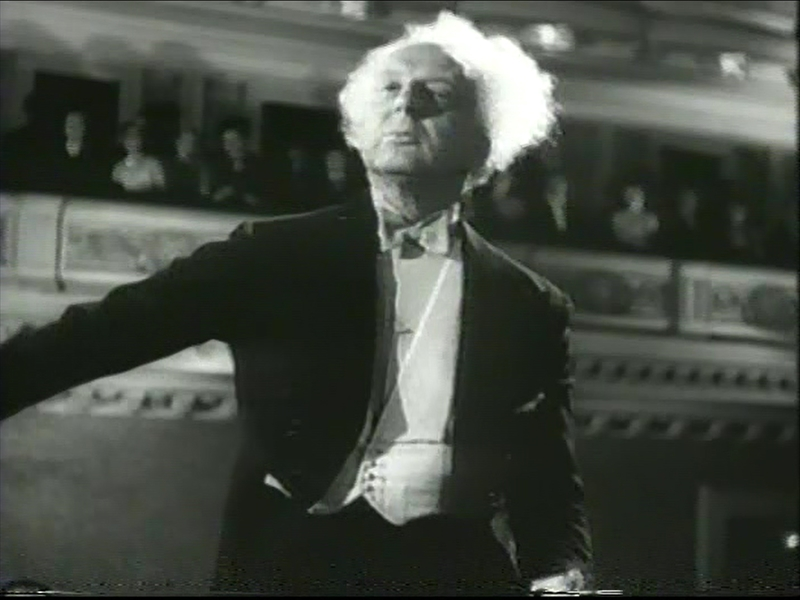
Screenshot from the 1947 film Carnegie Hall

=== International career ===
However, when in 1950 Dimitri Mitropoulos was appointed chief conductor of the NYPO, Stokowski began a new international career which commenced in 1951 with a nationwide tour of England: during the Festival of Britain celebrations he conducted the Royal Philharmonic Orchestra at the invitation of Sir Thomas Beecham. It was during this first visit that he made his debut recording with a British orchestra, the Philharmonia Orchestra, of Rimsky-Korsakov's Scheherazade. During that same summer he also toured and conducted in Germany, Holland, Switzerland, Austria, and Portugal, establishing a pattern of guest-conducting abroad during the summer months while spending the winter seasons conducting in the United States. This scheme was to hold good for the next 20 years during which Stokowski conducted many of the world's greatest orchestras, simultaneously making recordings with them for various labels. Thus he conducted and recorded with the main London orchestras as well as the Berlin Philharmonic, the Orchestre de la Suisse Romande, the French National Radio Orchestra, the Czech Philharmonic, the Hilversum (Netherlands) Radio Philharmonic, and others.

=== Symphony of the Air, Houston Symphony Orchestra ===
Stokowski returned to the NBC Symphony Orchestra in 1954 for a series of recording sessions for RCA Victor. The repertoire included Beethoven's 'Pastoral' Symphony, Sibelius's 2nd Symphony, Acts 2 and 3 of Tchaikovsky's Swan Lake and highlights from Saint-Saëns's Samson and Delilah with Risë Stevens and Jan Peerce. After the NBC Symphony Orchestra was disbanded as the official ensemble of the NBC radio network, it was re-formed as the Symphony of the Air with Stokowski as notional music director, and as such performed many concerts and made recordings from 1954 until 1963. The US premiere in 1958 of Turkish composer Ahmet Adnan Saygun's oratorio Yunus Emre is among them. He made a series of Symphony of the Air recordings for the United Artists label in 1958 which included Beethoven's 7th Symphony, Shostakovich's 1st Symphony, Khatchaturian's 2nd Symphony and Respighi's Pines of Rome.

From 1955 to 1961, Stokowski was also the music director of the Houston Symphony. For his debut appearance with the orchestra he gave the first performance of Mysterious Mountain by Alan Hovhaness – one of many living American composers whose music he championed over the years. He also gave the US premiere in Houston of Shostakovich's 11th Symphony (7 April 1958) and made its first American recording on the Capitol label.

=== American Symphony Orchestra, Chicago Symphony Orchestra, and London ===
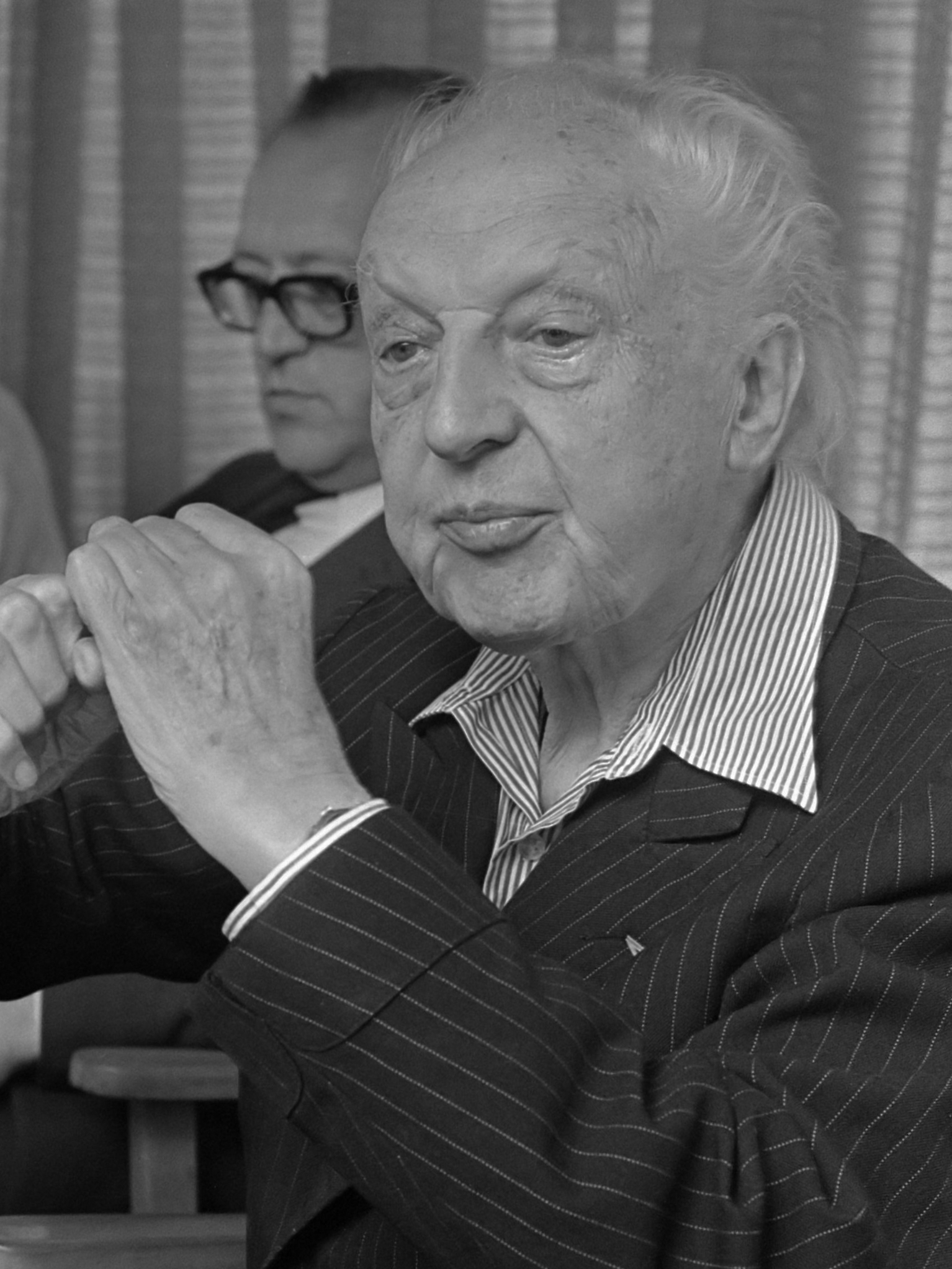
Leopold Stokowski (1970)

In 1960, Stokowski made one of his infrequent appearances in the opera house, when he conducted Giacomo Puccini's Turandot at the New York Metropolitan, in memorable performances with a cast that included Birgit Nilsson, Franco Corelli and Anna Moffo. At the New York City Opera, he had led double-bills of Œdipus rex (with Richard Cassilly) and Carmina Burana (1959), as well as L'Orfeo (with Gérard Souzay) and Il prigioniero (with Norman Treigle, 1960).

In 1962, at the age of 80, Stokowski founded the American Symphony Orchestra (ASO). His championship of the 20th-century composer remained undiminished, and perhaps his most celebrated premiere with the American Symphony Orchestra was of Charles Ives's 4th Symphony in 1965, which CBS also recorded. In addition, he continued to collaborate with noted contemporary soloists of the time including the pianist Glenn Gould in a recording of Beethoven's Piano Concerto No. 5, Op 73 ("Emperor") in 1966. Stokowski served as music director for the ASO until May 1972 when, at the age of 90, he returned to live in England. On 3 January 1962, still showing his interest in using technological innovation, he was featured in a telecast for WGN-TV conducting the Chicago Symphony Orchestra, which has since been made available on DVD. One of his British guest conducting engagements in the 1960s was the first Proms performance of Gustav Mahler's Second Symphony, Resurrection, since issued on CD.

Stokowski continued to conduct for a few more years, but failing health forced him to conduct only for recording sessions. An eyewitness said that Stokowski often conducted sitting down in his later years; sometimes, as he became involved in the performance, he would stand up and conduct with remarkable energy. His last public appearance in the UK took place at the Royal Albert Hall, London, on 14 May 1974. Stokowski led the New Philharmonia in the 'Merry Waltz' of Otto Klemperer (in tribute to the Philharmonia's former music director who had died the previous year), Vaughan Williams's Fantasia on a Theme by Thomas Tallis, Ravel's Rapsodie espagnole and Brahms's 4th Symphony. Stokowski's final public appearance took place on 22 July 1975 during the Vence Music Festival in the South of France. He conducted the Rouen Chamber Orchestra in several of his own transcriptions of Bach.

External audio
- 1: Listen to Leopold Stokowski conducting Modest Mussorgsky's Pictures at an Exhibition with the New Philharmonia Orchestra in 1965 at archive.org

=== Last years ===
Stokowski gave his last world premiere in 1973 when, at the age of 91, he conducted Havergal Brian's 28th Symphony in a BBC radio broadcast with the New Philharmonia Orchestra. In August 1973, Stokowski conducted the International Festival Youth Orchestra at Royal Albert Hall in London, performing Tchaikovsky's Fifth Symphony. Edward Greenfield of The Guardian wrote: "Stokowski rallied them as though it was a vintage Philadelphia concert of the 1920s". Stokowski continued to make recordings even after he had retired from the concert platform, mainly with the National Philharmonic, another ad-hoc orchestra made up of first-desk players chosen from the main London orchestras. In 1976, he signed a recording contract with Columbia Records that would have kept him active until he was 100 years old.

=== Death ===
Stokowski died of a heart attack on 13 September 1977 at his Nether Wallop, Hampshire, residence at the age of 95. His very last recordings, made shortly before his death, for Columbia, included performances of the youthful Symphony in C by Georges Bizet and Felix Mendelssohn's 4th Symphony, "Italian", with the National Philharmonic Orchestra in London. He is interred at East Finchley Cemetery.

== Recording ==
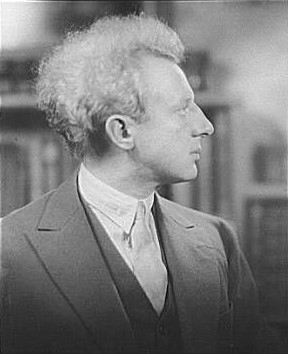
Portrait of Stokowski in 1926

Stokowski made his very first recordings, with the Philadelphia Orchestra, for the Victor Talking Machine Company in October 1917, beginning with two of Brahms' Hungarian Dances. Other works recorded in the early sessions were the scherzo from Mendelssohn's A Midsummer Night's Dream incidental music and "Dance of the Blessed Spirits" from Gluck's Orfeo ed Euridice. He found ways to make the best use of the acoustic recording process, until electric recording was introduced by Victor in the spring of 1925. He conducted the first orchestral electrical recording to be made in America (Saint-Saëns's Danse Macabre) in April 1925. The following month Stokowski recorded Marche Slave by Tchaikovsky, in which he increased the double basses to best use the lower frequencies of early electrical recording. Stokowski was also the first conductor in America to record all four of Brahms' symphonies (between 1927 and 1933).

External audio
- Listen to Stokowski conducting his orchestration of Franz Liszt's Hungarian Rhapsody No. 2 with the Philadelphia Orchestra in 1927 at archive.org

Stokowski made the first US recordings of the Beethoven 7th and 9th Symphonies, Antonín Dvořák's New World Symphony, Pyotr Ilyich Tchaikovsky's 4th Symphony and Nutcracker Suite, César Franck's Symphony in D minor, Nikolai Rimsky-Korsakov's Scheherazade, Sergei Rachmaninoff's 2nd Piano Concerto (with the composer as soloist), Jean Sibelius's 4th Symphony (its first recording), Dmitri Shostakovich's 5th and 6th Symphonies, and many shorter works. His early recordings were made at Victor's Trinity Church studio in Camden, New Jersey until 1926, when Victor began recording the orchestra in the Academy of Music in Philadelphia. Stokowski and the Philadelphia Orchestra later participated in long playing, high fidelity, and stereophonic experiments, during the early 1930s, mostly for Bell Laboratories (Victor even released some early Long Playing Records around this time, which were not commercially successful for several reasons). Stokowski and the Philadelphia Orchestra continued to record exclusively for Victor through December 1940. One of his last 1940 sessions was the world premiere recording of Shostakovich's sixth symphony. In addition to RCA Victor, Stokowski recorded prodigiously for several other labels until shortly before his death, including Columbia, Capitol, EMI/His Master's Voice, Everest, United Artists, and Decca/London.

In 1954, Stokowski made his first commercial stereo recordings with the NBC Symphony Orchestra for RCA Victor. These records were of excerpts from Prokofiev's ballet Romeo and Juliet and the complete one-act ballet Sebastian by Gian Carlo Menotti. From 1947 to 1953, Stokowski recorded for RCA Victor with a specially assembled 'ad hoc' band of players drawn principally from the New York Philharmonic and NBC Symphony Orchestras. The records were credited to 'Leopold Stokowski and His Symphony Orchestra' and the repertoire ranged from Haydn (his Imperial Symphony) to Schoenberg (Transfigured Night) by way of Schumann, Liszt, Bizet, Wagner, Tchaikovsky, Debussy, Ralph Vaughan Williams, Sibelius and Percy Grainger. Stokowski's recordings for Capitol Records in the 1950s were distinguished by the use of three-track stereophonic tape recorders.

Stokowski was very careful in the placement of musicians during recording sessions and worked closely with the recording staff to achieve the best possible results. Some of the sessions took place in the ballroom of the Riverside Plaza Hotel in New York City in January and February 1957; these were produced by Richard C. Jones and engineered by Frank Abbey with Stokowski's own orchestra, which was typically drawn from New York musicians (primarily members of the Symphony of the Air). The CD reissue by EMI included selections originally released on two LPs – The Orchestra and Landmarks of a Distinguished Career—and featured music of Paul Dukas, Samuel Barber, Richard Strauss, Harold Farberman, Vincent Persichetti, Tchaikovsky, Mussorgsky, Debussy, Bach (as arranged by Stokowski), and Sibelius. Although he officially used the Ravel orchestration of the finale to Mussorgsky's Pictures at an Exhibition in his 1957 Capitol recording, he did add a few additional percussion instruments to the score. His Capitol recording of Holst's The Planets was made with the Los Angeles Philharmonic Orchestra. EMI, which acquired Angel Records and Capitol in the 1950s, reissued many of Stokowski's Capitol recordings on CD; these recordings are now controlled by Warner Classics, after their acquisition of EMI Classics in 2013. All of the music that Stokowski conducted in Fantasia was released on a 3-LP set by Disneyland Records, in the 1957 soundtrack album made from the film. After stereo became possible on phonograph records, the album was released in stereo on Buena Vista Records. With the advent of compact discs, it appeared on a 2-CD Walt Disney Records set, in conjunction with the film's 50th anniversary.

In 1958, Stokowski signed a contract with Everest Records, which was noted for its use of 35 mm film instead of tape and the resulting highly vivid sound. One of Stokowski's most notable Everest recordings was a coupling of Tchaikovsky's Francesca da Rimini and Hamlet with the New York Stadium Symphony Orchestra (the summer name for the New York Philharmonic). Stokowski's other remarkable Everest recordings include Villa-Lobos' tone poem Uirapuru, Shostakovich's Symphony No. 5 and Prokofiev's ballet suite Cinderella. Several of Stokowski's televised concerts have been issued on both VHS and DVD, including Beethoven's 5th Symphony and Schubert's Unfinished Symphony with the London Philharmonic on EMI Classics 'Classic Archive' label; the Nielsen 2nd Symphony with the Danish Radio Orchestra on VAI (Video Artists International); and Charles Ives' 4th Symphony with the American Symphony Orchestra on Classical Video Rarities.

In 1973, Stokowski was invited by the International Festival of Youth Orchestras to conduct the 1973 International Festival Orchestra, numbering 140 of the world's finest young musicians, in a performance of Tchaikovsky's Fifth Symphony at the Royal Albert Hall, London. The Cameo Classics LP label recorded the concert, and also, by special permission of the maestro, the final rehearsals, which would make up a 2-LP set. Edward Greenfield in The Guardian reported "Stokowski rallied them as though it was a vintage Philadelphia concert of the 1920s". Robert M. Stumpff ll (Leopold Stokowski Club of America) called the performance "The finest ever performance of this symphony". This unique Dolby recording was restored in 2014 by Klassik Haus and is available from Cameo Classics on CD (Nimbus Records Distribution).

== Personal life ==
=== Marriages ===
Stokowski married three times. His first wife was American concert pianist Olga Samaroff, to whom he was married from 24 April 1911 until their divorce on 30 July 1923. They had one daughter: Sonya Maria Noel Stokowski (24 December 1921 – 19 March 2025), an actress.

His second wife was Johnson & Johnson heiress Evangeline Love Brewster Johnson, an artist and aviator, to whom he was married from 11 January 1926 until their divorce on 2 December 1937. They had two daughters: Gloria Luba Stokowski and Andrea Sadja Stokowski. In March 1938, Stokowski began a highly publicised relationship with film actress Greta Garbo after the two vacationed together in Italy, on the island of Capri. Whether or not their relationship was romantic or platonic was the subject of much speculation and scrutiny in the press.

On 21 April 1945, Stokowski married heiress and actress Gloria Vanderbilt. They had two sons, Leopold Stanislaus Stokowski (born 1950) and Christopher Stokowski (born 1952). They divorced on 29 October 1955.

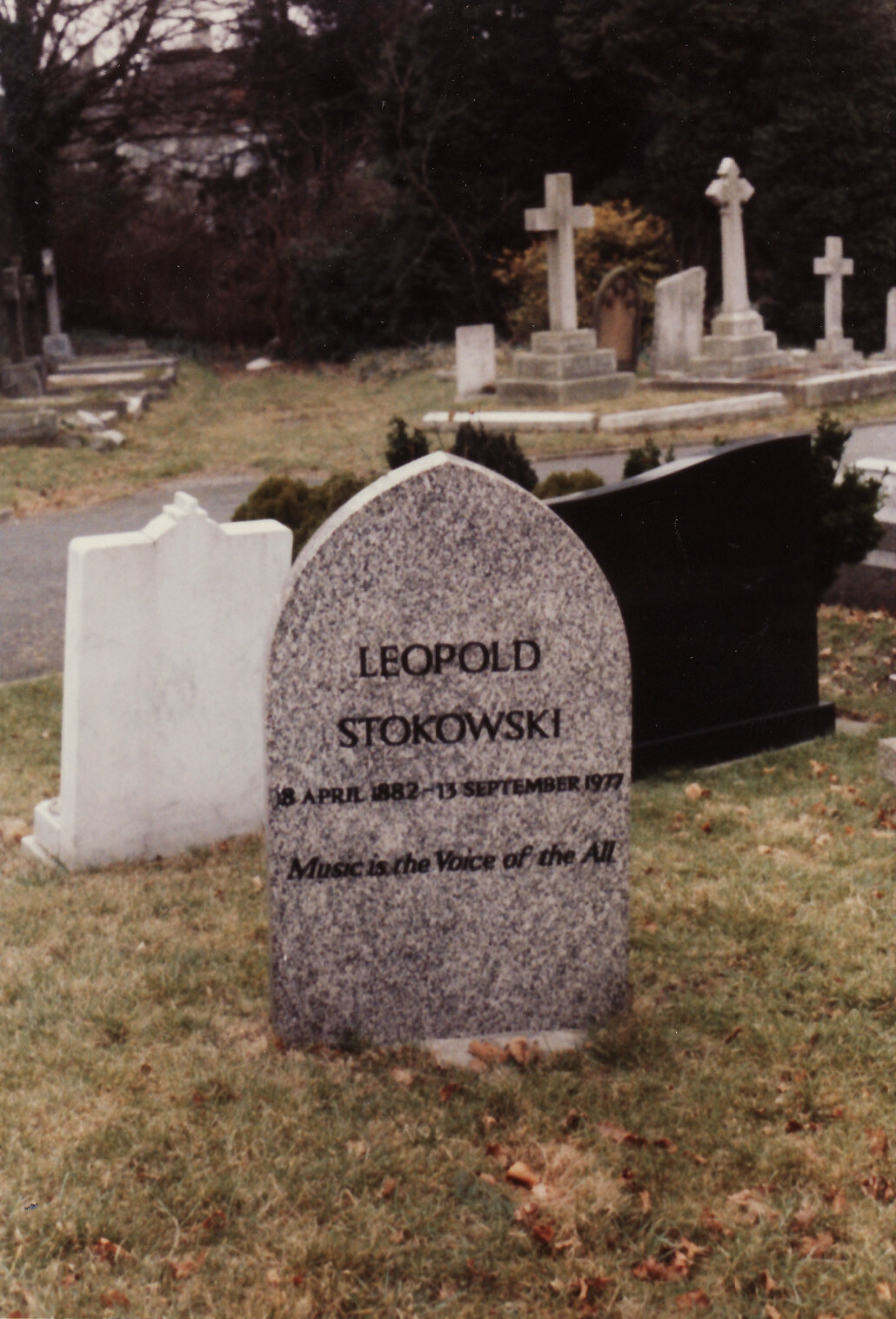
Stokowski's grave at East Finchley Cemetery.

== Legacy ==
After Stokowski's death, Tom Burnam writes the "concatenation of canards" that had arisen around him was revived—that his name and accent were phony; that his musical education was deficient; that his musicians did not respect him; that he cared about nobody but himself. Burnam suggests that there was a dark, hidden reason for these rumours. Stokowski deplored the segregation of symphony orchestras in which women and minorities were excluded, and, Burnam claims, his detractors got revenge by slandering him. Nevertheless, and notwithstanding Burnam's claims, attitudes towards Stokowski have changed dramatically since his death.

In 1999, for Gramophone magazine, the noted music commentator David Mellor wrote: "One of the great joys of recent years for me has been the reassessment of Leopold Stokowski. When I was growing up there was a tendency to disparage the old man as a charlatan. Today it is all very different. Stokowski is now recognised as the father of modern orchestral standards. He possessed a truly magical gift of extracting a burnished sound from both great and second-rank ensembles. He also loved the process of recording and his gramophone career was a constant quest for better recorded sound. But the greatest pleasure of all for me is his acceptance now as an outstanding conductor of nineteenth- and twentieth-century music, including a lot that was at the cutting edge of contemporary achievement."

His collection of 935 orchestral scores and 215 orchestral transcriptions is now in the libraries of the University of Pennsylvania.

== Concert premieres ==
- Edgard Varèse, Ameriques, Philadelphia Orchestra, Philadelphia, 9 April 1926
- Sergei Rachmaninoff, Fourth Piano Concerto, composer as soloist, Philadelphia Orchestra, 1927
- Sergei Rachmaninoff, Rhapsody on a Theme of Paganini, composer as soloist, Philadelphia Orchestra, Baltimore, 7 November 1934
- Sergei Rachmaninoff, Third Symphony, Philadelphia Orchestra, 1936
- Arnold Schoenberg, Violin Concerto, Louis Krasner as soloist, Philadelphia Orchestra, 6 December 1940
- Arnold Schoenberg, Piano Concerto, Eduard Steuermann as soloist, NBC Symphony Orchestra, New York City, 16 February 1944
- Nathaniel Shilkret, Concerto for Trombone, Tommy Dorsey as soloist, New York City Symphony Orchestra, 15 February 1945
- Elie Siegmeister, Symphony No. 1, New York Philharmonic, New York City, 30 October 1947
- Alan Hovhaness, Symphony No. 2, Mysterious Mountain, Houston Symphony Orchestra, Houston, Texas, 1955
- Charles Ives, Fourth Symphony, American Symphony Orchestra, Carnegie Hall, New York City, 26 April 1965

== Recording premieres ==
External audio
- Listen to Stokowski conducting Antonin Dvorak's Symphony No. 9 in E minor From the New World, Op. 95 with the Philadelphia Orchestra in 1927 at archive.org

- Arnold Schoenberg, Gurre-Lieder, Philadelphia Orchestra, 9 and 11 April 1932, RCA Victor
- Jean Sibelius, Fourth Symphony, Philadelphia Orchestra, 23 April 1932, RCA Victor
- Sergei Rachmaninoff, Rhapsody on a Theme of Paganini, composer as soloist, Philadelphia Orchestra, 24 December 1934, RCA Victor
- Dmitri Shostakovich, Sixth Symphony, Philadelphia Orchestra, August 1940, RCA Victor
- Ralph Vaughan Williams, Sixth Symphony, Philharmonic Symphony Orchestra of New York, 21 February 1949, Columbia
- Gustav Mahler, Eighth Symphony, Philharmonic Symphony Orchestra of New York, Westminster Choir, Schola Cantorum of New York, Public School Boys' Chorus, 9 April 1950, NYP Editions (first complete recording)

== See also ==
- List of famous Poles
