= Symphony No. 6 (Prokofiev) =

1947 symphony by Sergei Prokofiev

- by Sergei Prokofiev
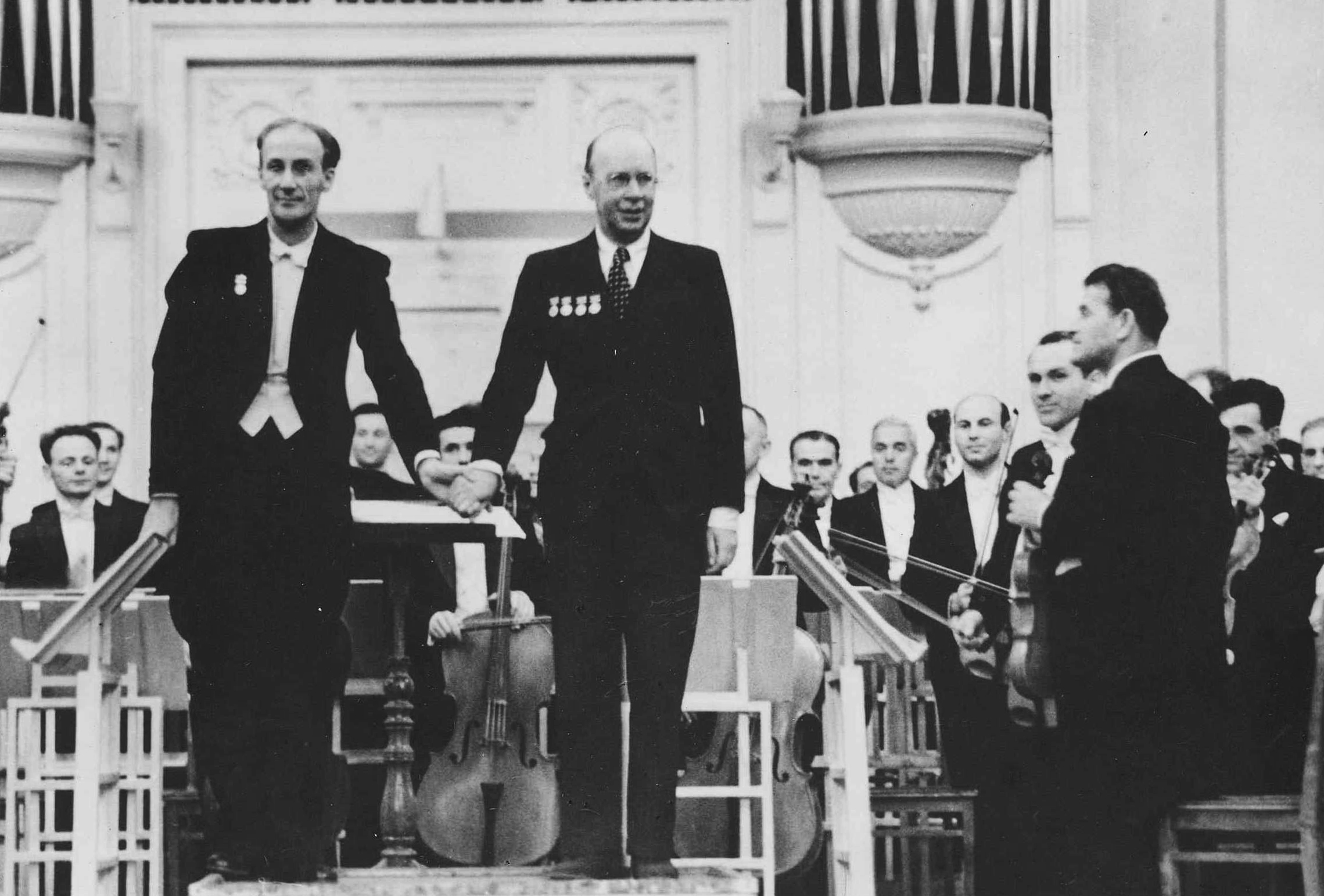
- Yevgeny Mravinsky and Prokofiev taking a bow after the second performance on October 12, 1947
- Key: E♭ minor
- Opus: 111
- Composed: 1945–47
- Duration: 42 min
- Movements: Three

Premiere
- Date: October 11, 1947
- Location: Leningrad Philharmonic Hall; Leningrad, Russian SFSR
- Conductor: Yevgeny Mravinsky
- Performers: Leningrad Philharmonic

The Symphony No. 6 in E♭ minor, Op. 111, by Sergei Prokofiev was completed and premiered in 1947. Sketches for the symphony exist as early as from June 1945; Prokofiev had reportedly begun work on it prior to composing his Fifth Symphony. He later remarked that the Sixth memorialized the victims of the Great Patriotic War.

Despite the enthusiastic interest of Alexander Gauk, Prokofiev instead chose to have the Sixth's premiere conducted by Yevgeny Mravinsky, who was impressed by the symphony after the composer played it for him. The premiere, which was played by the Leningrad Philharmonic Orchestra on October 11, 1947, was a success. Initially, the symphony was received very warmly in the Soviet press; it was compared favorably with Dmitri Shostakovich's Eighth Symphony. In 1948, it came under attack during the Zhdanovschina, including from critics who had previously praised it.

After Prokofiev's death, the Sixth was rehabilitated in the Soviet Union. It also gained critical favor in the West, where reaction had initially been mixed. According to Tempo, the Sixth is the "great, crowning" work of Prokofiev's symphonic output.

== Background ==
Israel Nestyev reported that the composer had begun sketching out what eventually became the Sixth Symphony before he had embarked upon composing the Fifth. Prokofiev himself declared that work on the Sixth and its predecessor had overlapped. He also referred to both symphonies as "distractions" from his work on the opera Khan Buzai, a project which ultimately was unrealized. The first extant sketches for the Sixth are dated June 23, 1945. The sketch score was completed on October 9, 1946, whereupon he set it down for several weeks before starting the orchestration on December 10. Prokofiev completed the symphony on February 18, 1947. He briefly considered dedicating the symphony to the memory of Ludwig van Beethoven. Although the symphony shares the same opus number as Beethoven's final piano sonata, one of Prokofiev's favorite works, Nestyev said that the composer had contemplated the dedication because of "a desire to carry on the tradition of lofty intellectualism and profound tragedy that characterized Beethoven's later works".

In the weeks following the symphony's completion, Alexander Gauk expressed to Prokofiev his eagerness to premiere it. Nevertheless, the composer invited Yevgeny Mravinsky to hear him play his new symphony. On March 21, 1947, Mravinsky traveled with Prokofiev's friend Levon Atovmyan to the composer's dacha in Nikolina Gora. After listening to Prokofiev's playthrough, Mravinsky praised the music's scope. He told the composer's companion, Mira Mendelson, that the music sounded as if it had "spanned one horizon to the other". He immediately requested to lead the premiere.

Prokofiev prepared a brief description of the symphony ahead of its world premiere:

The first movement is agitated, at times lyrical, at times austere; the second movement, "Largo", is brighter and more tuneful; the finale, rapid and in a major key, is close in character to my Fifth Symphony, save for reminiscences of the austere passages in the first movement.

Nestyev recalled that in October 1947 the composer had told him the symphony had been conceived as a reflection on the destruction of the recently concluded Great Patriotic War:

Now we are rejoicing in our great victory, but each of us has wounds that cannot be healed. One has lost those dear to him, another has lost his health. These must not be forgotten.

On October 8, 1947, Prokofiev arrived in Leningrad to assist Mravinsky in the rehearsals with the Leningrad Philharmonic. During the rehearsals for the symphony, Prokofiev described to Mendelson, whom he had married in January, that the "reminiscences" heard near the finale's coda were "questions cast into eternity". After she repeatedly requested him to elaborate on their meaning, the composer replied: "What is life?"

== Music ==
External audio
- Performed by the Leningrad Philharmonic Orchestra conducted by Yevgeny Mravinsky
- I. Allegro moderato
- II. Largo
- III. Vivace

Prokofiev's Sixth Symphony consists of three movements:

1. Allegro moderato (E♭ minor, ends in E♭ major)
2. Largo (A♭ major)
3. Vivace (E♭ major)

A typical performance lasts approximately 42 minutes.

=== Instrumentation ===
The symphony is scored for:

Woodwinds

piccolo
2 flutes
2 oboes
English horn
E♭ clarinet
2 clarinets
bass clarinet
2 bassoons
contrabassoon

Brass

4 horns
3 trumpets
3 trombones
tuba

Percussion

timpani
bass drum
cymbals (crash and suspended)
snare drum
triangle
tamtam
tambourine
wood block

Keyboard

piano
celesta

Strings

harp
violins (1st and 2nd)
violas
cellos
double basses

== Premiere ==
The world premiere of Prokofiev's Sixth Symphony occurred on October 11, 1947, at the Leningrad Philharmonic Hall, performed by the Leningrad Philharmonic conducted by Mravinsky. It concluded a program which had also included music by Tchaikovsky. After the concert, Mravinsky confided to Prokofiev and Mendelson that the performance of the symphony was marred by a number of instrumental mishaps which had left him unhappy and unable to sleep. The following night, after attending a performance at the Kirov Opera of his War and Peace, Prokofiev left with his companion to hear the second performance of his Sixth Symphony. This time the orchestra played the score flawlessly. Prokofiev and Mravinsky both took several curtain calls during which they were photographed together.

== Reception ==
=== Soviet Union ===
In the weeks prior to the Sixth Symphony's world premiere, Prokofiev's biographer Nestyev and the music critic Grigori Schneerson complained that the composer was being "stingy" with explanations of a work they and the musicians of the Leningrad Philharmonic found difficult. The former would later write that in this symphony Prokofiev "once again began to speak in a very difficult and at times esoteric language". Nikolai Myaskovsky, the composer's colleague and longtime friend, also found the symphony challenging: "I began to understand the Prokofiev [Sixth Symphony] only on the third hearing and then I was won over: profound, but somewhat gloomy, and harshly orchestrated".

The level of acclaim that the Sixth Symphony initially received from Soviet audiences and critics was comparable to that for the Fifth. The audience at the world premiere gave it a nearly 30-minute standing ovation. "It is wonderful, better than the usual Prokofiev", Schneerson told Alexander Werth before the symphony's Moscow premiere. "It is philosophic, has the depth of Shostakovich. You'll see!" Likewise, Nestyev wrote in Sovietskoye Iskusstvo that the symphony depicted a "nerve-wracking juxtaposition" of the "private world of modern man against the terrifying machinery of universal destruction", adding that its "noble humanism" placed it alongside the Eighth Symphony by Dmitri Shostakovich. He also described the finale as being "in the spirit of Mozart or Glinka", but that its cheerful mood was dispelled by the invasion of a "titan" whose "incessantly repeated fanfares" reawaken the tragic sonorities from earlier in the symphony. The music critic of Leningradskaya Pravda praised the symphony as "another stunning victory for Soviet art", adding that "the optimism of this [work], its strong-willed intonations, character, and lyricism reflect the many facets of our people". Musicologist Yulian Weinkop elicited Prokofiev's approval by comparing the symphony's opening to the scrape of a rusty key turning in a door lock, before revealing a "world of warmth, affection, and beauty". According to Simon Morrison, its premiere was the "last unhampered, unmediated success" the composer would ever experience.

Nevertheless, the Sixth was among the works excoriated by Andrei Zhdanov and Tikhon Khrennikov the following year during their campaign against formalism in music. The latter lambasted what he perceived as its composer's inability to keep the symphony's "lively and limpid ideas" from being drowned in "contrived chaotic groanings", ultimately dismissing it as a "failure". Nestyev reversed his earlier approval, now decrying the symphony as "clearly formalist", an about-face which Atovmyan openly criticized. Nestyev later described the symphony as a "contest for complexity" which "made it difficult to grasp". Prokofiev felt deeply betrayed by Nestyev, whom he dubbed a "Judas", and permanently severed his friendship with him.

After Prokofiev's death, during the Khrushchev Thaw, the Sixth was again reevaluated by Soviet critics. Aram Khachaturian listed it among the works in which he felt that the composer maintained his "guiding principle" of "service to his people, to mankind". Boris Yarustovsky called the symphony a "true war symphony", ascribing to its predecessor only a "general feeling of patriotism", and opining that the work's numbering fated it to its tragic cast which "resemble almost all Russian sixth symphonies"; while Genrikh Orlov extolled it as "an outstanding symphony of our time". While maintaining his previous criticisms of the symphony, Nestyev also wrote that it was "not only an important event in the creative history of an outstanding musician, but also a unique artistic monument of its time".

=== In the West ===
Abroad reaction to the Sixth was initially mixed. After the New York Philharmonic-Symphony Orchestra conducted by Leopold Stokowski played the American premiere on November 24, 1949, Musical America called the Sixth "the most personal, the most accessible, and emotionally revealing work of Prokofiev that has yet been played in this country". Paul Affelder, the music critic for the Brooklyn Eagle, wrote that the Sixth was a "worthwhile piece of music", but objected to its structure:

Those who expected a work of the sturdy, but joyful proportions of this composer's popular Fifth Symphony came away disappointed. For the Sixth ... is an austere symphony whose mood does not relax until the third movement... [Its] structure does not satisfy us—at least not on a first hearing... If the composer ever revises this work, he would like to see the third movement shortened and shorn of its dramatic ending—in other words, transformed into a bona fide scherzo—and then have everything resolve in a fourth movement of heavier proportions.

The Sixth was sufficiently successful at its American premiere that Stokowski decided to reprogram it at a subsequent concert on December 6. That performance was broadcast live by CBS and was the first time the symphony was heard on the radio in the United States.

In response to the Swiss premiere in 1951, Robert-Aloys Mooser attacked the Sixth as another of Prokofiev's "insane, base compositions". He added that the Orchestre de la Suisse Romande was jeopardizing its reputation by playing it.

A brief obituary for Prokofiev which was published in the spring 1953 issue of Tempo said that the Sixth's large-scale architecture and attempts at optimism "did not really suit his talent". However, another critic writing in the same magazine in 1970 called the Sixth the "great, crowning" work of Prokofiev's symphonic output.
