= Symphony No. 6 (Shostakovich) =

1939 symphony by Dmitri Shostakovich

- by Dmitri Shostakovich
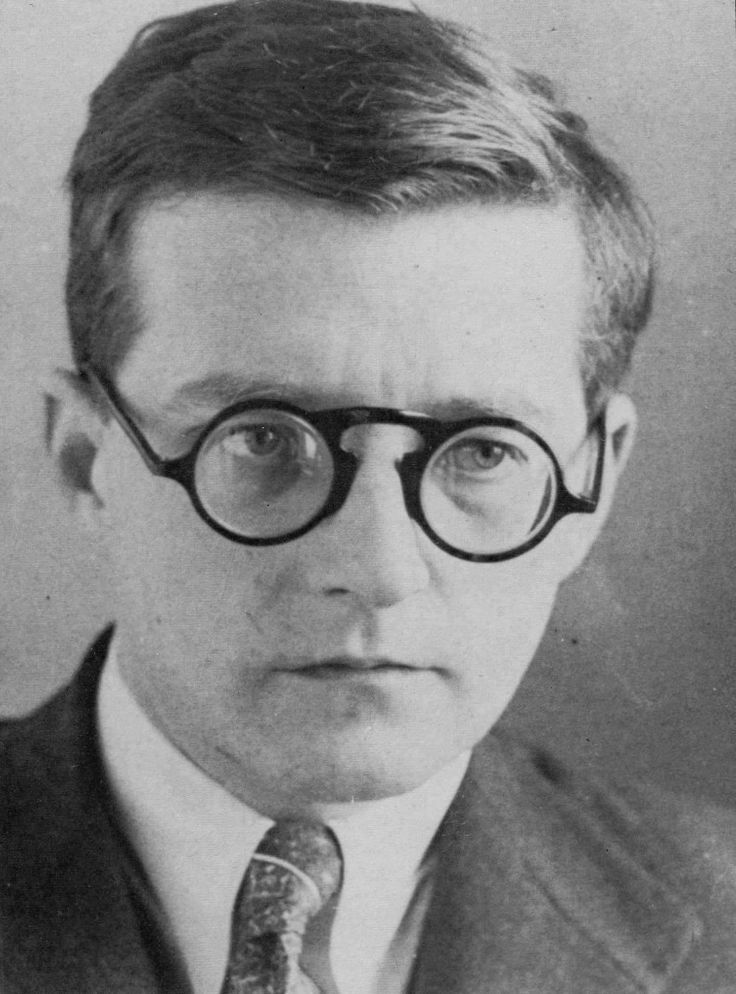
- Shostakovich before 1941
- Key: B minor
- Opus: 54
- Composed: 1939
- Duration: 30 minutes
- Movements: 3
- Scoring: Orchestra

Premiere
- Date: 5 November 1939
- Location: Leningrad
- Conductor: Yevgeny Mravinsky
- Performers: Leningrad Philharmonic Orchestra

The Symphony No. 6 in B minor, Op. 54 by Dmitri Shostakovich was written in 1939, and first performed in Leningrad on November 5, 1939, by the Leningrad Philharmonic Orchestra under Yevgeny Mravinsky.

== Structure ==
Symphony No. 6 is in three movements and lasts approximately 30 minutes:

1. Largo
2. Allegro
3. Presto

The Sixth Symphony is unusual in structure: a 'regular' symphonic structure would contain a first movement in sonata form, a scherzo, a slow movement, and a quick finale, often also in sonata form. This symphony, however, begins with a long and introspective slow movement, followed by two short movements: a scherzo and a "full-blooded and debauched music-hall galop".

According to music critic Herbert Glass, the "entire [first] movement is based on the cell of a minor third, with a second theme - which follows without transition - the motif of a diminished seventh, with the trill at its close forming the third major ingredient of the movement - the two themes and the trill combined as a sort of super-theme. The composer lays this out as clearly as if he were teaching a music-appreciation class: do listen for it. Chamber music effects abound with, for instance, piccolo or flute, eerily alone or accompanied by the B♭ clarinets. There are walloping climaxes, too, each of which dies away into the gloom. Note, too, the composer's wonderful spotlighting of the melancholy English horn, a lone figure after the din has evaporated."

The third movement galop is the movement Shostakovich himself thought was most successful. Music critic Daniel Hathaway noted that "Snare drums ratcheted up the riot of brutal sound in the Scherzo and references to the William Tell Overture and laughing trombones added a hilarious burlesque quality to the finale." On average, the first movement is 15–20 minutes long, the second movement is 4–6 minutes long, and the third movement is 5–7 minutes long.

== Instrumentation ==
This symphony is scored for piccolo, 2 flutes, 2 oboes, cor anglais, 3 clarinets (3rd doubling E♭ clarinet), bass clarinet, 3 bassoons (3rd doubling contrabassoon), 4 horns, 3 trumpets, 3 trombones, tuba, timpani, snare drum, bass drum, cymbals, triangle, tambourine, tam-tam, xylophone, harp, celesta and strings.

== History ==
In September 1938, Shostakovich announced that he was sketching out his Sixth Symphony, which would be a large-scale "Lenin Symphony" for soloists, chorus, and orchestra that would utilize the poem Vladimir Ilyich Lenin by Vladimir Mayakovsky. Shostakovich reported that the declamatory quality of the poem was challenging to set and that he was unsatisfied with the work he had done so far on the symphony. He later tried to incorporate other literature about Lenin in his new symphony, but without success. Speaking in a later radio address in January 1939, he announced that he was "getting ready to write" the Sixth Symphony, but made no mention of Lenin or Mayakovsky’s poem.

The purely instrumental Symphony No. 6 was completed in September 1939. Shostakovich commented on it in the press:

The musical character of the Sixth Symphony will differ from the mood and emotional tone of the Fifth Symphony, in which moments of tragedy and tension were characteristic. In my latest symphony, music of a contemplative and lyrical order predominates. I wanted to convey in it the moods of spring, joy, youth.

On 5 November 1939, the premiere of the Symphony No. 6 took place in the Large Hall of the Leningrad Philharmonic in Leningrad by the Leningrad Philharmonic Orchestra under Yevgeny Mravinsky. The concert was part of a 10-day festival of Soviet music that included performances of Sergei Prokofiev’s Alexander Nevsky, Yuri Shaporin’s On the Field of Kulikovo, and Shostakovich’s Fifth Symphony. On the same programme was the Romantic Poem for violin and orchestra by Valery Zhelobinsky. According to Isaak Glikman, the symphony had a successful premiere and the finale was encored. Leonid Entelis lauded the symphony in his review, predicting a bright future for it, and praising Shostakovich for his continued progress away from formalistic tendencies. Other critics remarked negatively upon what they considered was the symphony’s lopsided structure and its juxtaposition of moods.

The first recording was made by Leopold Stokowski with the Philadelphia Orchestra for RCA Victor in December 1940.
