= E-flat clarinet =

Sopranino member of the clarinet family

E♭ clarinet
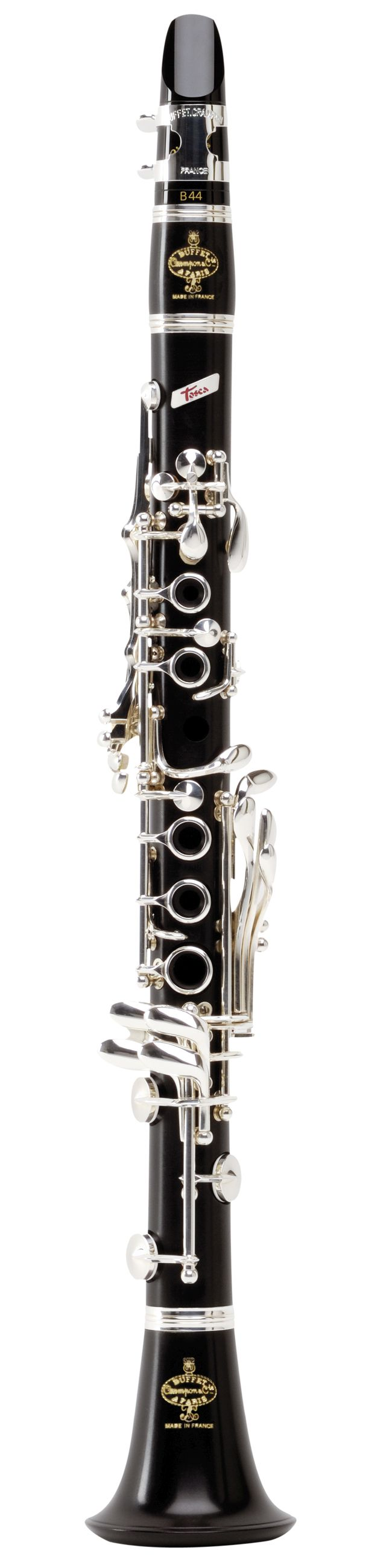
- E♭ clarinet with Boehm System keywork.

Woodwind instrument
- Classification: Woodwind; Wind; Reed aerophone
- Hornbostel–Sachs classification: 422.211.2 (Single reed instruments – with fingerholes)

Playing range
- written E3 - A6 sounding a minor third higher: G3 - C7

Related instruments
- Clarinet, D Clarinet; Ravel, Bolero

The E-flat (E♭) clarinet is a member of the clarinet family, smaller than the more common B♭ clarinet and pitched a perfect fourth higher. It is typically considered the sopranino or piccolo member of the clarinet family and is a transposing instrument in E♭ with a sounding pitch a minor third higher than written. The E♭ clarinet has a total length of about 49 centimetres (19 in).

In Italian, the term quartino refers specifically to the E♭ clarinet, particularly in band scores. The term terzino is also used, referring more generally to any small clarinet; in Italian scores, the E♭ clarinet is sometimes indicated as terzino in Mi♭, e.g. the Fantasia Eroica op. 33 (1913) by Francesco Paolo Neglia. Until the late nineteenth century, the term Elafà also indicated a clarinet in E♭.

The E♭ clarinet is used in orchestras, concert bands, and marching bands, and plays a central role in clarinet choirs, carrying melodies that would be uncomfortably high for the B♭ clarinet. Solo repertoire is limited, but composers from Berlioz to Mahler have used it extensively as a solo instrument in orchestral contexts.

== Tonal range ==
Many orchestration and instrumentation books show the highest written note for the E♭ clarinet as G6, compared to C7 for clarinets in A or B♭.

== Use in concert and military bands ==
Towards the end of the eighteenth century the clarinet in high F took this role until the E♭ clarinet took over beginning sometime in the second decade of the 1800s.

Although the E♭ is somewhat of a rarity in school bands, it is a staple instrument in college and other upper level ensembles. Unlike the B♭ soprano clarinet which has numerous musicians performing on each part, the E♭ clarinet part is usually played by only one musician in a typical concert band. This is partially because the E♭ clarinet has a bright, shrill sound similar to the sound of the piccolo. It commonly plays the role of a garnish instrument along with the piccolo, and duo segments between the two instruments are quite common. The E♭ clarinet is often heard playing along with the flutes and/or oboes.

Important soloistic parts in standard band repertoire for the E♭ clarinet include the second movement of Gustav Holst's First Suite in E♭ for Military Band (for two E♭ clarinets) and his piece "Hammersmith" (also for two E♭ clarinets), Paul Hindemith's Symphony in B♭ for Band, and Gordon Jacob's William Byrd Suite. The E♭ clarinet is also a featured player in modern wind band repertoire, such as Adam Gorb's Yiddish Dances, where it takes on a solo role for much of the five-movement piece.

== Use as children's clarinet ==
While most E♭ clarinets are built and marketed for professionals or advanced students, inexpensive plastic E♭ clarinets have been produced for beginning children's use. These have a simplified fingering system, lacking some of the trill keys and alternative fingerings.

== D clarinet ==
The slightly larger D clarinet is rare, although it was common in the early and mid-eighteenth century (see the Molter concertos below). The D clarinet has a total length of about 52 cm. From the end of that century to the present it has become less common than the clarinets in E♭, B♭, A, or even C. Handel’s Overture in D major for two clarinets and horn was probably written for two D clarinets. D clarinets were once commonly employed by some composers (e.g., Rimsky-Korsakov's Mlada) to be used by one player equipped with instruments in D and E♭ — analogous to a player using instruments in B♭ and A. In modern performance (especially in North America and western Europe outside German-speaking countries), it is normal to transpose D clarinet parts for E♭ clarinet.

The rationale underlying a composer's choice between E♭ and D clarinet is often difficult to discern and can seem perverse, especially when the option not chosen would be easier for the player to execute. For instance, the original version of Arnold Schoenberg's Chamber Symphony No. 1 is for E♭ clarinet while the orchestral version is for D. Certain passages of Maurice Ravel's Daphnis et Chloe are set in concert D but are scored for E♭ clarinet, with the effect that some fingerings in those passages are extremely difficult on the E♭ clarinet, which is forced to play in its B major, but would be much easier on a D clarinet, which would play in its C major. Another famous example is the D clarinet part of Richard Strauss's Till Eulenspiegels lustige Streiche.

== Solo and chamber literature for the E♭ (or D) clarinet ==
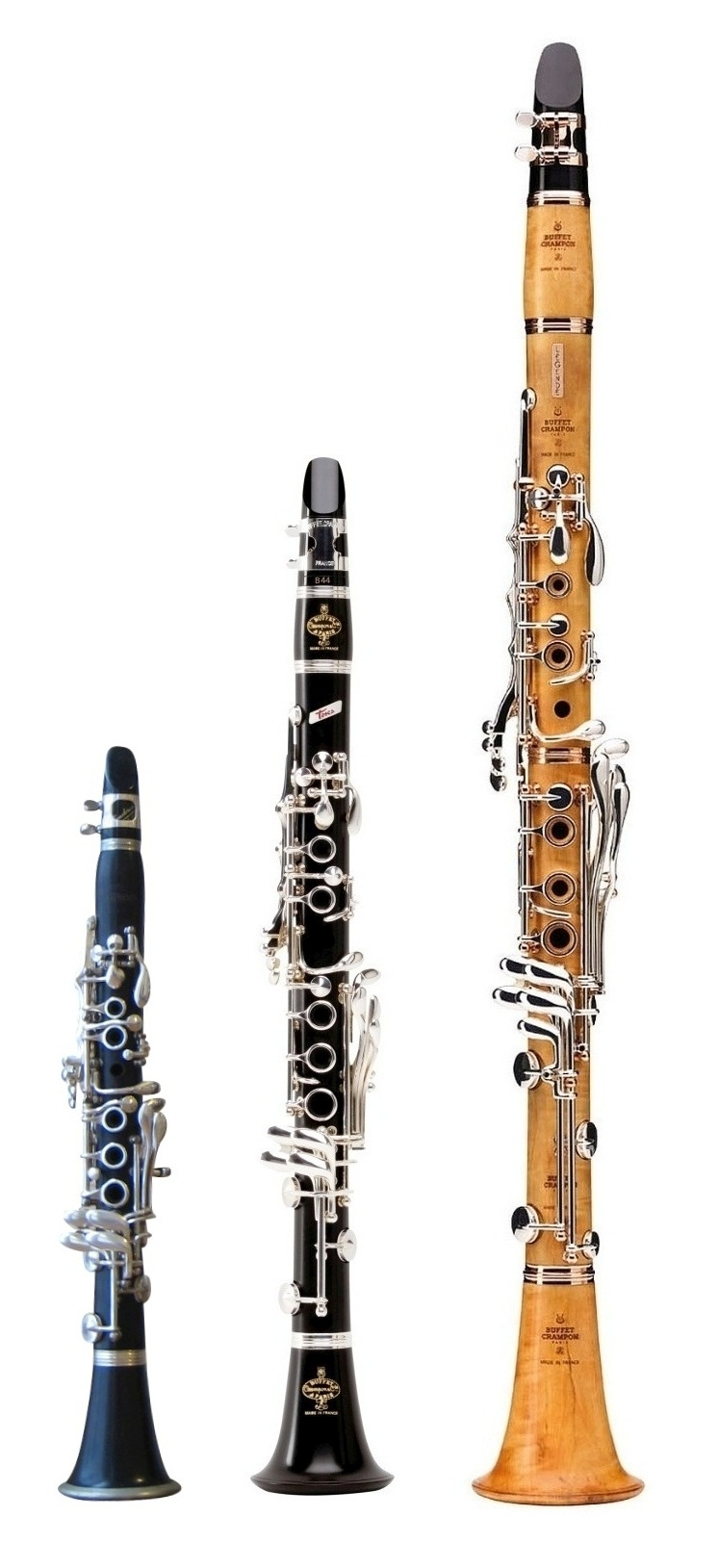
Size comparison: clarinets in A♭, E♭, and B♭

Solo works for these instruments are relatively rare however steadily increasing in number.

- Johann Melchior Molter: Six Clarinet Concerti (D; among the earliest extant clarinet concerti).
- Concerti by Jerome Neff and William Neil.
- Ernesto Cavallini: Carnival of Venice variations, Fantasia on a Theme from Ultimo Giorno Di Pompeii, and (with Giacomo Panizza) I figli di Eduardo 4th (all for E♭ clarinet and piano).
- Paul Mefano: Involutive for solo E♭ clarinet
- Henri Rabaud: "Solo de Concours" for E♭ clarinet.
- Jeroen Speak: Epeisodos for solo E♭ clarinet.
- Amilcare Ponchielli: Quartetto for B♭ and E♭ clarinets, flute, and oboe, with piano accompaniment.
- Giacinto Scelsi: "Tre Pezzi for E♭ Clarinet"
- William Bolcom: "Suite of Four Dances for E♭ Clarinet"
- Manuel Lillo Torregrosa: "Teren Rof", "Vivencias", "Obviam ire siglo", "Angular": Concerts 1, 2, 3, 4 for E♭ Clarinet and Band
- Arnold Schoenberg: Suite, op. 29 (E♭, B♭, and bass clarinet, violin, viola, violoncello, piano).
- Anton Webern: Drei Lieder fur Singstimme, Es-Klarinette und Gitarre Op.18.

== Orchestral and operatic music using the E♭ (or D) clarinet ==
Parts written for D clarinet are usually played on the more popular E♭ clarinet, with the player transposing or playing from a written part transposed a semitone lower.

Orchestral compositions and operas in the standard repertoire with notable E♭ or D clarinet solos include:

- Hector Berlioz: Symphonie fantastique (E♭)
- Maurice Ravel: Boléro (E♭)
- Richard Strauss: Till Eulenspiegels lustige Streiche (D)
- Igor Stravinsky: The Rite of Spring (D and E♭)
- Dmitri Shostakovich - Symphony No. 6 (E♭), The Golden Age (E♭), Lady Macbeth of Mtsensk (E♭)
- Gustav Mahler - Symphony No. 1 (E♭)

Additional uses include:

- Béla Bartók:
  - Bluebeard's Castle (1 & 2 double E♭)
  - Miraculous Mandarin (E♭ and D)
- Leonard Bernstein:
  - Candide
  - West Side Story
  - On the Town
  - Divertimento for Orchestra
  - Slava! A Political Overture
- Aaron Copland: El Salon Mexico
- Edward Elgar: Symphony No. 2
- Leoš Janáček: Sinfonietta
- Gustav Mahler: Symphonies Nos. 2 (2 E♭s), 3 (2 E♭s), 4, 5 (D), 6 (4th movement for D), 7, 8, 9, 10
- Carl Orff:
  - Carmina Burana (Orff)
  - De temporum fine comoedia (6 clarinets in E♭, with three doubling B♭)
- Sergei Prokofiev:
  - Symphonies Nos. 4, 5, 6
  - Scythian Suite (3 doubles E♭)
- Maurice Ravel:
  - Daphnis et Chloé
  - L'enfant et les sortilèges
  - Piano Concerto in G
  - Piano Concerto for the Left Hand
- Franz Schmidt: Symphony No. 4
- Dmitri Shostakovich:
  - Symphonies Nos. 4, 5, 7, 8, 10
  - The Tale of the Priest and His Workman Balda
- Richard Strauss:
  - Ein Heldenleben
  - Eine Alpensinfonie
  - Also sprach Zarathustra
  - Sinfonia Domestica (D)
  - Josephslegende (D)
- Igor Stravinsky:
  - The Firebird (D)
  - The Nightingale (D and E♭)

== Recent usage ==
After 1950, works using E♭ clarinet are too numerous to note individually. However, among those where the instrument is featured beyond what would be considered normal in recent music are John Adams's Chamber Symphony, where two players play E♭ and bass clarinet and "double" on soprano and Adriana Hölszky's A due for two E♭ clarinets. The extended techniques of the B♭ clarinet, including multiphonics, flutter tonguing, and extreme registers, have all been imported to the E♭.

== Bibliography ==
- Hadcock, Peter, "Orchestral Studies for the E♭ Clarinet", Roncorp Publications. A useful resource for the E♭ player by long-time E♭ Boston Symphony player and New England Conservatory faculty member Hadcock, containing many of the standard excerpts, guides to performance, and an extensive fingering chart.
- Gangl, Manuel (2021). "The E-flat clarinet. history, intonation, sound, equipment, geometry, tonal range, repertoire list, tips and more. Part 1", MG Verlag. Manuel Gangl is E-flat clarinetist in the Vienna Symphony Orchestra.
- Gangl, Manuel (2022). "The D clarinet & The Molter clarinet concerto No. 1", MG Verlag.
