= Manuel Lillo Torregrosa =

Spanish composer (1940–2024)

Manuel Lillo Torregrosa (26 September 1940 – 21 November 2024) was a Spanish composer.

== Life and career ==
Lillo Torregrosa joined the Banda Sinfónica Municipal de Madrid in 1959, and became E-flat clarinet (requinto in the Spanish language) soloist for them. He was also a member of the Orquesta Nacional de España and founder of the LIM contemporary music group.

He wrote more than 600 works, 70 of them symphonic and the remainder popular. His symphonic works include compositions for E♭ Clarinet, Clarinet and Sax.

The paso doble is a specialty of Manuel Lillo, who composed such well known paso dobles as "Plaza de las Ventas" or "Costa Dorada".

Lillo Torregrosa was also a transcriber of works for Symphonic Band.

Lillo Torregrosa died on 21 November 2024, at the age of 84.

== Awards ==
- 1975, Gold Medal of Merit of Culture Minister of Spain (Banda Municipal Madrid)
- 2003, First prize in National Faller Pasodoble of Alzira

== Selected works ==
=== Symphonic ===
- Teren Rof, Concert No.1 for E♭ Clarinet and Band
- Suite para trompa, Concert No.1 for Horn and Band
- Mares lunares, Symphony No.1
- Vivencias, Concert No.2 for E♭ Clarinet and Band
- Sinfonia en el mar menor, Symphony No.2
- Lillo canovas, Concert No.1 for Trumpet and Band
- Ni en Paris, Concert for E♭ Clarinet, B♭ Clarinet and Band
- Medir con vara, Concert for Trombone and Band
- Betelgeuse, Symphony No.3
- Fiesta mediterranea, Symphonic Suit
- Palacia real de tafalla, Symphonic poem
- Una maravilla muchachos, Symphonic poem
- Cuadros abulenses, Symphonic suite

=== Chamber ===
- "Formateados", Clarinets Quartet No.2
- "Zaldua", Galop for Piccolo Clarinet. Galop for Clarinets Quartet
- "Acuarelas", Clarinets Quartet No.3
- "Con viento fresco", Clarinets Quartet No.4
- "Tulaytula", Saxophone ensemble
- "En equilibrio", Clarinets Quartet No.5
- "Lambuco", Divertiment Violin & Piano / E♭ Clarinet & Piano
- "El máscara", Galop for E♭ Clarinet
- "Sopa caña", Saxophone ensemble

=== Pasodoble and March ===
- "Costa blanca", Pasodoble
- "Costa del azahar", Pasodoble
- "Costa dorada", Pasodoble
- "Kiosko del retiro", Pasodoble
- "Plaza de las ventas", Pasodoble
- "Comandante campos", Pasodoble
- "Ramillete de claveles", Pasodoble
- "Vicente Ferrero", Pasodoble
- "Ciudad de Tafalla", Pasodoble
- "Marcha de los embajadores", March-Pasodoble
- "El capote", Pasodoble
- "Viva la fiesta", March
- "Coso y albero de bargas", Pasodoble
- "El caporal", Pasodoble
- "La unión de llira", Pasodoble
