= Symphony No. 9 (Shostakovich) =

1945 symphony by Dmitri Shostakovich

- by Dmitri Shostakovich
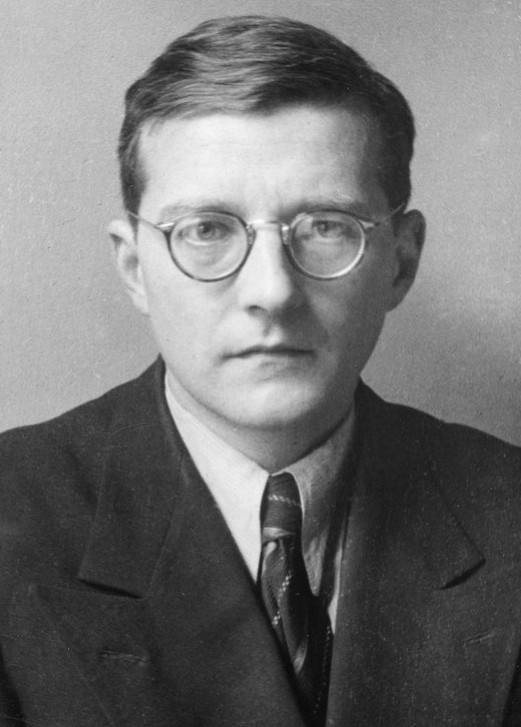
- Shostakovich in 1942
- Key: E♭ major
- Opus: 70
- Composed: 1945
- Duration: c. 25-28 minutes
- Movements: 5
- Scoring: Orchestra

Premiere
- Date: 3 November 1945
- Location: Leningrad
- Conductor: Yevgeny Mravinsky
- Performers: Leningrad Philharmonic Orchestra

The Symphony No. 9 in E♭ major, Op. 70, was composed by Dmitri Shostakovich in 1945. It was premiered on 3 November 1945 in Leningrad by the Leningrad Philharmonic Orchestra under Yevgeny Mravinsky.

== History ==
=== Development ===
The Ninth Symphony was originally intended to be a celebration of the Soviet victory over Nazi Germany in World War II. Shostakovich declared in October 1943 that the symphony would be a large composition for orchestra, soloists, and chorus.

Shostakovich told his students on 16 January 1945 that he had begun work on a new symphony the day before. A week later, he told them that he had reached the middle of the development section, and the work was going to open with a big tutti. Isaak Glikman heard around ten minutes of the music Shostakovich had written for the first movement in late April. Soon thereafter, Shostakovich stopped working on the symphony. He resumed work on 26 July 1945 and finished on 30 August 1945. The resulting symphony was unrelated to the one he had originally planned.

=== Premières ===
Shostakovich and Sviatoslav Richter played the Ninth Symphony in a four-hand arrangement for musicians and cultural officials in early September 1945. The premiere, conducted by Yevgeny Mravinsky, took place on 3 November 1945 in the opening concert of the 25th season of the Leningrad Philharmonic Orchestra, sharing the program with Tchaikovsky's Symphony No. 5. The concert was broadcast live on the radio.

The Moscow premiere took place on 20 November 1945. A possible draft for the first movement of the original version of the Ninth Symphony, published as Symphonic Fragment, was conducted by Gennady Rozhdestvensky on 20 November 2006. A Naxos CD containing a recording of the Symphonic Fragment was released in 2009.

=== Reception ===
Shostakovich remarked that "musicians will like to play it, and critics will delight in blasting it". The initial reaction of his peers to the new symphony was generally favourable:

Transparent. Much light and air. Marvellous tutti, fine themes (the main theme of the first movement – Mozart!). Almost literally Mozart. But, of course, everything very individual, Shostakovichian... A marvellous symphony. The finale is splendid in its joie de vivre, gaiety, brilliance, and pungency!!

— Gavriil Nikolayevich Popov

Soviet critics censured the symphony for its "ideological weakness" and its failure to "reflect the true spirit of the people of the Soviet Union". On 20 September 1946, a highly critical article by musicologist Izrail Nestyev was published:

What remains to be proposed is that the Ninth Symphony is a kind of respite, a light and amusing interlude between Shostakovich's significant creations, a temporary rejection of great, serious problems for the sake of playful, filigree-trimmed trifles. But is it the right time for a great artist to go on vacation, to take a break from contemporary problems?

— Izrail Vladimirovich Nestyev, "Remarks on the Work of D. Shostakovich: Some Thoughts Occasioned by His Ninth Symphony"

The symphony was also coolly received in the West: "The Russian composer should not have expressed his feelings about the defeat of Nazism in such a childish manner" (New York World-Telegram, 27 July 1946).

The Ninth Symphony was nominated for the Stalin Prize in 1946, but did not win. By order of Glavrepertkom, the central censorship board, the work was banned on 14 February 1948 in his second denunciation together with some other works by the composer. It was removed from the list in the summer of 1955 when the symphony was performed and broadcast.

== Instrumentation ==
The symphony is scored for:

Woodwinds
Piccolo
2 Flutes
2 Oboes
2 Clarinets in B♭ and A
2 Bassoons

Brass
4 Horns
2 Trumpets
3 Trombones
Tuba

Percussion
Timpani
Snare drum
Bass drum
Cymbals
Triangle
Tambourine

Strings
1st Violins
2nd Violins
Violas
Cellos
Double basses

== Form ==
The work has five movements, the last three played without interruption:

1. Allegro, 2/2, E♭ major
2. Moderato, 3/4, B minor
3. Presto, 6/8, G major
4. Largo, 2/4, B♭ minor
5. Allegretto — Allegro, 2/4, E♭ major

A typical performance lasts for around 26 minutes, which makes this symphony one of Shostakovich's shortest.
