= Symphony No. 8 (Shostakovich) =

Symphony by Dmitri Shostakovich

- by Dmitri Shostakovich
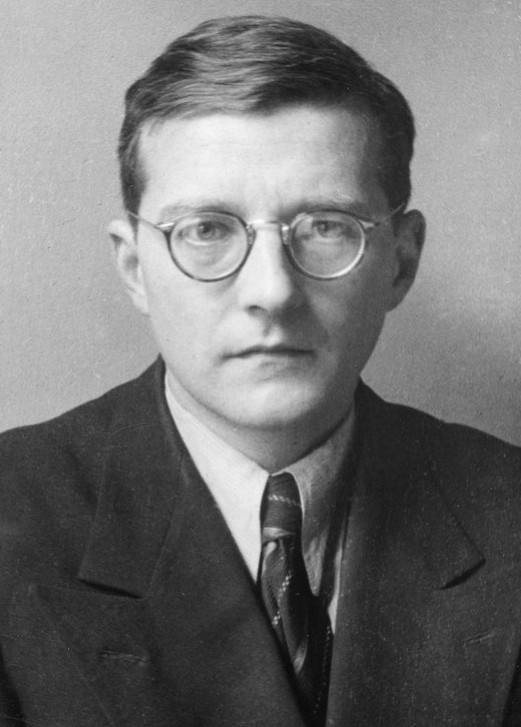
- Shostakovich in 1942
- Key: C minor
- Opus: 65
- Composed: 1943
- Duration: 1 hour
- Movements: 5
- Scoring: Orchestra

Premiere
- Date: November 4, 1943
- Conductor: Yevgeny Mravinsky
- Performers: USSR Symphony Orchestra

The Symphony No. 8 in C minor, Op. 65, by Dmitri Shostakovich was written in the summer of 1943, and first performed on 4 November of that year by the USSR Symphony Orchestra under Yevgeny Mravinsky, to whom the work is dedicated. It was briefly nicknamed the "Stalingrad Symphony" following the American premiere in 1944.

Music critics have ranked it among the composer's finest scores. David Haas has argued that the work falls within the tradition of other C minor "tragedy to triumph" symphonies, such as Beethoven's Fifth, Brahms' First, Bruckner's Eighth, and Mahler's Second, although there is considerable disagreement over the level of optimism present in the final pages. Shostakovich's friend Isaac Glikman called this symphony "his most tragic work". The work, like many of his symphonies, breaks some of the standard conventions of symphonic form and structure. Shostakovich clearly references themes, rhythms and harmonies from his previous symphonies, most notably Symphony No. 5 and Symphony No. 7.

== Movements ==
The work consists of five movements:

1. Adagio – Allegro non troppo (C minor)
2. Allegretto (D♭ major)
3. Allegro non troppo (E minor) –
4. Largo (G♯ minor) –
5. Allegretto (C major)

The first movement, which runs roughly half an hour, is by far the longest. It opens with a dramatic motif played fortissimo in octaves, characterised by David Haas in his study as a "fate" motif:

However, the motif is immediately replaced by the two subjects of this sonata form movement, both lyrical in character. In the development section, the second subject is transformed before march motifs come to dominate. The recapitulation sees a dissonant version of the fate motif displaced by a cor anglais solo which restates the second subject.

The composer described the short second movement allegretto as "a march with elements of a scherzo":

The third movement (conventionally described as a toccata) is again short, driven onwards by motor rhythms:

This movement has been interpreted as a depiction of battle, or (by Kurt Sanderling) as "the crushing of the individual" by the Soviet system. It finally erupts into a "massive climax of self-destruction", leading to the penultimate movement, a subdued passacaglia. This in turn, as in Beethoven's Fifth Symphony, leads directly into the C major finale. However, in contrast to Beethoven's exuberant conclusion, Shostakovich provides a pastoral rondo in which solo woodwinds again dominate. The movement begins with a passage for solo bassoon, and ends quietly with both pizzicato and sustaining strings; for some additional color, a solo flute joins in for the last note of the motive, at the very bottom of its range. The pizzicato material is an inverted version of the symphony's opening fate motif, and is connected by Haas to a similar passage for soprano voice in the fifth movement of Mahler's Second. Here, however, there is no resurrection: "The hero who announced himself using the voices of cor anglais and bassoon has not clearly triumphed, merely survived".

The weight of the first and final movements of the symphony is centered on simultaneous crescendos of the snare and bass drums, while trumpets call to the pinnacle which is overlaid by woodwind trills.

A second interval is used as a motif throughout the symphony: C–B♭–C in the opening motif of the first movement, D♭–C–D♭ in the theme of the second movement, E–F–E in the third movement (here separated by an octave), and C–D–C in the last movement.

== Instrumentation ==
The symphony is scored for a large orchestra which consists of the following:

Woodwinds

4 flutes (3rd and 4th doubling piccolos)
2 oboes
cor anglais
2 B♭ clarinets
E♭ clarinet
bass clarinet
3 bassoons (3rd doubling contrabassoon)

Brass
4 horns
3 trumpets
3 trombones
tuba

Percussion

timpani
bass drum
tambourine
2 pairs of crash cymbals
suspended cymbals
snare drum
triangle
xylophone
tam-tam

Strings

1st violins
2nd violins
violas
cellos
double basses

== Reception ==
In a letter to Glikman, the composer wrote:

I am sure that it will give rise to valuable critical observations which will both inspire me to future creative work and provide insights enabling me to review that which I have created in the past. Rather than take a step backward I shall thus succeed in taking one forward.

It was indeed not well received, although reviews were tepid rather than scathing. The bleak tone, and in particular the lack of an optimistic conclusion, made it unsuitable as propaganda at home or abroad. Shostakovich's friend Ivan Sollertinsky noted that, "the music is significantly tougher and more astringent than the Fifth or the Seventh and for that reason is unlikely to become popular". The symphony was criticized by Sergei Prokofiev and others at a Composers' Plenum in March 1944, and after the Zhdanov decree of 1948 it was effectively banned until eight years later. The symphony was rehabilitated in October 1956, in a performance by the Moscow Philharmonic Orchestra conducted by Samuil Samosud.

It was introduced to the western hemisphere during World War II by CBS correspondent Bill Downs, who returned from the Moscow bureau to the United States with the score.

== Sources ==
- Fay, Laurel (1999). Shostakovich: A Life. Oxford University Press. ISBN 0-19-513438-9.
- Haas, David (2000). "Shostakovich's Eighth: C minor Symphony against the Grain". In Rosamund Bartlett (ed.). Shostakovich in Context. Oxford New York: Oxford University Press. ISBN 978-0-19-816666-5. OCLC 42397957.
- Shostakovich, Dmitri; Glikman, Isaac (2001). Story of a Friendship: The Letters of Dmitry Shostakovich to Isaak Glikman. Cornell University Press. ISBN 0-8014-3979-5.
- Wilson, Elizabeth (1994). Shostakovich: A Life Remembered. Princeton University Press. ISBN 0-691-04465-1.
