= Yevgeny Mravinsky =

Soviet conductor (1903–1988)

- Евгений Мравинский
- Portrait of Mravinsky, 1957, by Lev Russov
- Born: Yevgeny Aleksandrovich Mravinsky; 4 June 1903; Saint Petersburg, Russian Empire
- Died: 19 January 1988 (aged 84); Leningrad, Russian SFSR, Soviet Union
- Occupations: Conductor; pianist; pedagogue

Yevgeny Aleksandrovich Mravinsky (Russian: Евгений Александрович Мравинский; 4 June [O.S. 22 May] 1903 – 19 January 1988) was a Soviet and Russian conductor, pianist, and music pedagogue; he was a professor at Leningrad State Conservatory.

== Biography ==
Mravinsky was born in Saint Petersburg. The soprano Yevgeniya Mravina was his aunt. His father, Alexandr Konstantinovich Mravinsky, died in 1918, and in that same year, the young Mravinsky began to work backstage at the Mariinsky Theatre, serving as a ballet répétiteur from 1923 to 1931. After initially studying biology at the university in Leningrad, in 1924 he succeeded in entering the Leningrad Conservatory as a non–fee–paying student thanks to his half-aunt Alexandra Kollontai, who recommended him to the rector, Alexander Glazunov, and the commissar for enlightenment, Anatoly Lunacharsky.

Mravinsky's first public conducting appearance was in 1929. Throughout the 1930s, he conducted at the Kirov Ballet and Bolshoi Opera. In September 1938, he won the All-Union Conductors Competition in Moscow.

In 1931, Mravinsky made his debut with the Leningrad Philharmonic Orchestra. In October 1938, he was appointed its principal conductor, a post which he held until his death. Under Mravinsky, the Leningrad Philharmonic gained international renown, particularly in performances of Russian music. During World War II, Mravinsky and the orchestra were evacuated to Siberia.

The music of Dmitri Shostakovich was closely associated with Mravinsky, beginning with conducting the world premiere of the composer's Fifth Symphony. The conductor would subsequently lead the world premieres of the Sixth, Eighth (which Shostakovich dedicated to Mravinsky), Ninth, Tenth, and Twelfth Symphonies, as well as the Song of the Forests, Violin Concerto No. 1, and Cello Concerto No. 1. In 1962, Mravinsky had declined to conduct the premiere of Shostakovich's Symphony No. 13, in the wake of the diagnosis of his third wife Inna's terminal cancer. This action caused a disruption in the working relationship between Shostakovich and Mravinsky, which included Mravinsky also refusing to conduct the premiere of Shostakovich's Cello Concerto No. 2, pleading inadequate time to prepare the work. In the early 1970s, Mravinsky and Shostakovich repaired their working relationship. Of the remaining Shostakovich symphonies that he did not premiere, Mravinsky only performed (and recorded) the Seventh, Eleventh, and Fifteenth.

He also premiered Sergei Prokofiev's Sixth Symphony.

Mravinsky made studio recordings from 1938 to 1961, including recording the symphonies of Tchaikovsky for Deutsche Grammophon, first in monaural sound in Vienna, then stereo remakes in London. His issued recordings post-1961 were taken from live concerts. His final recording was of an April 1984 live performance of Shostakovich's Symphony No. 12.

In 1946, Mravinsky's international career began with tours of Finland and Czechoslovakia at the Prague Spring Festival. Later tours with an orchestra included a June 1956 itinerary to western Europe. Their only appearance in the United Kingdom was in September 1960 at the Edinburgh Festival and the Royal Festival Hall, London. Their first tour to Japan was in May 1973. Their last foreign tour was in 1984, to West Germany.

On 6 March 1987, Mravinsky led his final concert, a program consisting of Schubert's Symphony No. 8 and Brahms' Symphony No. 4. After a prolonged illness, Mravinsky died in Leningrad in 1988 at the age of 84.

Mravinsky was married four times. His first marriage was to Marianna Schwalck (1888–1979), in 1922. His second marriage was to Olga Alexeyevna Karpova (1903–1990), in 1938. Both ended in divorce. His marriage to his third wife, Inna Mikhailovna Serikova (1923–1964), lasted from 1960 until her death. His fourth marriage was to Alexandra Mikhailovna Vavilina (born 1928), from 1967 until his death.

== Conducting style ==
Surviving videos show that Mravinsky had a sober appearance on the podium, making simple but clear gestures, often without a baton. The critic James McCarthy said of Mravinsky's Tchaikovsky performances:

The Leningrad Philharmonic play like a wild stallion only just held in check by the willpower of its master. Every smallest movement is placed with fierce pride; at any moment it may break into such a frenzied gallop that you hardly know whether to feel exhilarated or terrified.

== Method ==
In a 1970s interview on Leningrad Television, when asked how he chose a particular interpretation of the music he conducted, Mravinsky explained that he tried to understand what the composer's intention was by immersing himself in the "atmosphere" of the music (he used the term "atmospherization").

== Recordings ==
Mravinsky recorded for the state classical label Melodiya and for Deutsche Grammophon. Additionally, in the 21st century, his recordings were made available by Erato Records and Profil – G Haenssler.

== Sources ==
- Tassie, Gregor, "A Truly Noble Conductor". Gramophone (US Edition), May 2002, pp. 36–37.

Cultural offices
Preceded by Fritz Stiedry	Principal Conductor, Leningrad Philharmonic Orchestra; 1938–1988	Succeeded by Yuri Temirkanov
