= Mikhail Chulaki =

Russian composer

Mikhail Ivanovich Chulaki (Russian: Михаи́л Ива́нович Чула́ки, also transliterated as Tchulaki and Tschulaki) (November 19 [O.S. November 6] 1908 in Simferopol – January 29, 1989 in Moscow) was a Soviet Russian composer and teacher. Three Stalin Prizes second degree (1947, 1948, 1950).

== Biography ==
He studied under the composer Vladimir Shcherbachov at the Leningrad Conservatory, graduating in 1931. He held administrative and teaching positions, including at the Leningrad Conservatory (1933–1941, 1944–1948), and taught composition at the Moscow Conservatory (from 1948): among his composition pupils was the 15-year-old Mstislav Rostropovich, whom Chulaki did much to support both materially and as an artist. Before World War II he was artistic director of the Leningrad Philharmonic.

From 1963 to 1970 he worked as artistic director of the Bolshoi Theatre, Moscow. While in that post, he gave Rostropovich his first major break as a conductor, inviting him to conduct Tchaikovsky's Eugene Onegin.

His son was the writer Mikhail Mikhailovich Chulaki.

== Notes and references ==
- Ho, Allan & Feofanov, Dmitry. Biographical Dictionary of Russian/Soviet Composers. New York: Greenwood Press, 1989. ISBN 0-313-24485-5
- Wilson, Elizabeth. Shostakovich: A Life Remembered. London: Faber & Faber, 2006. ISBN 0-571-22050-9
- Wilson, Elizabeth. Mstislav Rostropovich: Cellist, Teacher, Legend. London: Faber & Faber, 2007. ISBN 978-0-571-22051-9
