= Symphony No. 5 (Shostakovich) =

1937 symphony by Dmitri Shostakovich

- by Dmitri Shostakovich
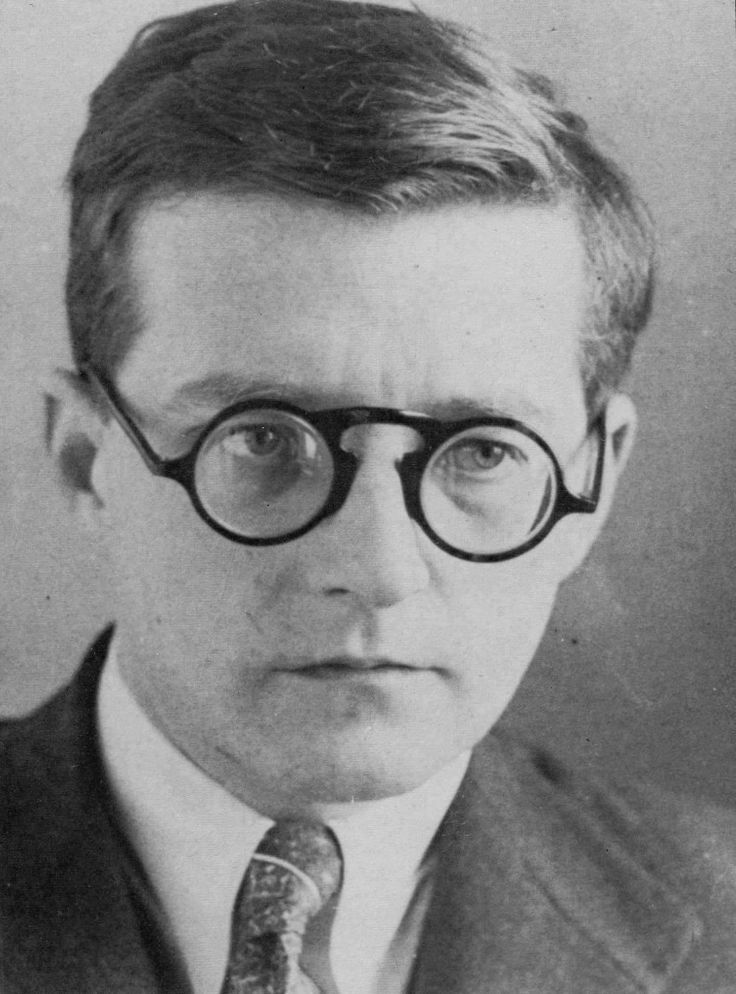
- Shostakovich before 1941
- Key: D minor
- Opus: 47
- Composed: April–July 1937
- Duration: c. 45 minutes
- Movements: 4
- Scoring: Orchestra

Premiere
- Date: 21 November 1937
- Location: Leningrad
- Conductor: Yevgeny Mravinsky
- Performers: Leningrad Philharmonic Orchestra

The Symphony No. 5 in D minor, Op. 47, by Dmitri Shostakovich is a work for orchestra composed between April and July 1937. Its first performance was on 21 November 1937, in Leningrad by the Leningrad Philharmonic Orchestra under Yevgeny Mravinsky. The premiere was a "triumphal success" that appealed to both the public and official critics, receiving an ovation that lasted well over half an hour.

== Instrumentation ==
The work is scored for two flutes and piccolo, two oboes, two clarinets and E♭ clarinet, two bassoons and contrabassoon, four horns, three B♭ trumpets, three trombones, tuba, timpani, snare drum, triangle, cymbals, bass drum, tam-tam, glockenspiel, xylophone, two harps (one part), piano, celesta and strings.

== Form ==
The work is in four movements:

1. Moderato
2. Allegretto
3. Largo
4. Allegro non troppo

=== I. Moderato ===
The first movement, in D minor, is in sonata form. The exposition opens with a "strenuous" string figure in canon of rising and falling minor sixths that quickly narrow to minor thirds.

The opening's dotted rhythm persists as a lyrical first theme is played by the first violins. This theme presents itself as a descending five-tone motif in bars 6-7, but Shostakovich had already used it in the second movement of his fourth symphony (bars 318-321), which was recognized there as a quotation from Gustav Mahler's song "Des Antonius von Padua Fischpredigt", from Des Knaben Wunderhorn; specifically, the line "He goes to the rivers and preaches to the fishes". In its original appearance, this Mahler quotation is juxtaposed with musical notation in the shape of a nose (on page 122 of the Sikorski score), the notes in the "nose" being a quotation from "The Internationale", which was also previously hidden in bars 25-30 of the first movement of the 4th symphony, with the effect of depicting the futility of the socialist "sermon".

For the appearance of this quotation in the fifth symphony, the five-tone Mahler motif occurs in a total of 15 variants in the first and third movements, and bears witness to Shostakovich's secret triumph in being able to describe the party doctrine that had silenced his earlier work as a completely useless sermon. This provocative insight is therefore part of Shostakovich's "creative response of a Soviet artist to justified criticism". However, since the fourth symphony had been withdrawn before the premiere in 1936 and could only be presented to the public 25 years later, the extramusical context was lost when the 5th symphony was premiered in Leningrad. Only later has this connection between the fourth and fifth symphonies, which undermines the demands of "socialist realism", been uncovered.

The first theme is repeated several times in combination with the opening motif, and greatly varied with new demarcations and penetrations. There is a great deal of variation and linking of all elements, giving the impression of a single continuous process.

The secondary theme (mm. 50-120) in E♭ minor, introduced by the first violins, offers the greatest possible contrast to the main theme. The tempo is more fluid, and the sustained tones of the secondary theme are linked by wide intervals: octaves, fourths, sevenths instead of the dominant seconds found in the first theme. Simplicity prevails over complexity, as the far-reaching lyrical melody is accompanied by chords in a continuous, slightly lively rhythm.

An accompanying figure takes the lead at the beginning of the powerful development. Only now does the tempo of this movement reach Allegro. Themes from the exposition appear in augmentation and diminution in contrapuntal conflicts with themselves. The thematic material is transformed into a grotesquely distorted quick march in a wide development with military drums and trumpets. After several false starts, from m. 157 the second theme intervenes in the action.

In the recapitulation, which is heavily reduced compared to the exposition, themes heard earlier on are brought back again either identically or somewhat varied. Near the end of the movement, the second subject is heard again in the form of a canon played by flute and horn, this time in D major, then the same material is played by the piccolo and a solo violin in D minor. The movement ends with the celesta playing a rising figure, and slowly fading away.

In general, the inner drama of the first movement can be described as an interplay between lamentation and mourning, contrasting with a "departure for battle" which reaches its climax with the entry of the recapitulation. In the end, the outcome of this conflict proves to be ambiguous, and the looming threats have not yet been resolved.

=== II. Allegretto ===
The second movement is in a ternary scherzo form, or minuet and trio form, in A minor, but it more closely resembles a ländler than either a minuet or a scherzo.

The first section and its reprise consist of a rather loose and varied sequence of ländler melodies. The movement opens with a heavy, loud introduction in the cellos and basses, followed by a softer solo on the E♭ clarinet and the French horn, later oboes, and finally strings. At the end of this development, the ländler becomes grotesque and bloated.

The trio has a peculiar harmony. Degrees I and VII alternate in the basic position, so that parallel fifths constantly arise. The effect does not sound like folk music, but rather like "run-down" music. The trio begins with a violin solo that is then restated by the flute.

In the recapitulation, some of the material heard earlier is repeated piano and staccato, not loudly and sustained as was at the beginning. The introduction, originally played by the cellos and basses, is now played by the bassoon and contrabassoon, followed by the violins and violas playing the E♭ clarinet and French horn solo with pizzicato.

The movement closes in A minor with four canonically enriched fortissimo bars. Overall, the scherzo lacks innocence and humor; closer listening assures that the peace is not to be trusted, considering the numerous unusual modulations and occasional discords.

=== III. Largo ===
Shostakovich begins this movement with F♯ minor violins in three sections, rather than the more usual two. The opening theme is played by the third violins. Second and first violins are slowly added and continue the melody. After the assertive trumpets of the first movement and the raucous horns of the second, this movement uses no brass at all, so there is a limited palette of sounds. This section yields to a pair of flutes in widely-separated counterpoint, the second of which makes reference to the first subject of the first movement. The solo is then passed on to the oboe with string accompaniment. The third movement ends like the first, with a celesta solo that slowly fades away. The strings are divided throughout the entire movement (3 groups of violins, violas in 2, cellos in 2).

This movement is a culmination of resignation, mourning and lamentation, which in the center of the movement increases to a passionate accusation with clarinet, xylophone and piano. Otherwise the movement is more chamber music-like and carried by the string orchestra. The tonality is floating and often not definable, free-floating and independent linearity of the individual voices prevails.

=== IV. Allegro non troppo ===
The D minor finale, also in sonata form, differs greatly from its predecessors, mostly with regard to melodic structure and motives. Various themes from earlier in the work are expanded until we get to a new theme played on the trumpet. This new theme is passed on to the strings and eventually the piece becomes quieter. The development section is much quieter and more tranquil, and is ultimately replaced by a march, where the melodies from earlier are played slowly, accompanied by timpani. The music builds as the new accompaniment passes from timpani to woodwinds and then to strings, finally reaching a point where the piece changes from a minor key into a major key: D major.

== Overview ==
=== Composition ===
The Symphony quotes Shostakovich's song Vozrozhdenije (Op. 46 No. 1, composed in 1936–37), most notably in the last movement; the song is a setting of a poem by Alexander Pushkin (find text and a translation here) that deals with the matter of rebirth. This song is by some considered to be a vital clue to the interpretation and understanding of the whole symphony. In addition, commentators have noted that Shostakovich incorporated a motif from the "Habanera" from Bizet's Carmen into the first movement, a reference to Shostakovich's earlier infatuation with Elena Konstantinovskaya, who refused his offer of marriage; she subsequently moved to Spain and married the photographer and film director Roman Karmen.

=== Reception ===
With the Fifth Symphony, Shostakovich gained an unprecedented triumph, with the music appealing equally—and remarkably—to both the public and official critics, though the overwhelming public response to the work initially aroused suspicions among certain officials. The then-head of the Leningrad Philharmonic, Mikhail Chulaki, recalls that certain authorities bristled at Mravinsky's gesture of lifting the score above his head to the cheering audience, and a subsequent performance was attended by two plainly hostile officials, V. N. Surin and Boris M. Yarustovsky, who tried to claim in the face of the vociferous ovation given the symphony that the audience was made up of "hand-picked" Shostakovich supporters. Yet the authorities in due course claimed that they found everything they had demanded of Shostakovich restored in the symphony. Meanwhile, the public heard it as an expression of the suffering to which it had been subjected by Stalin. The same work was essentially received two different ways.

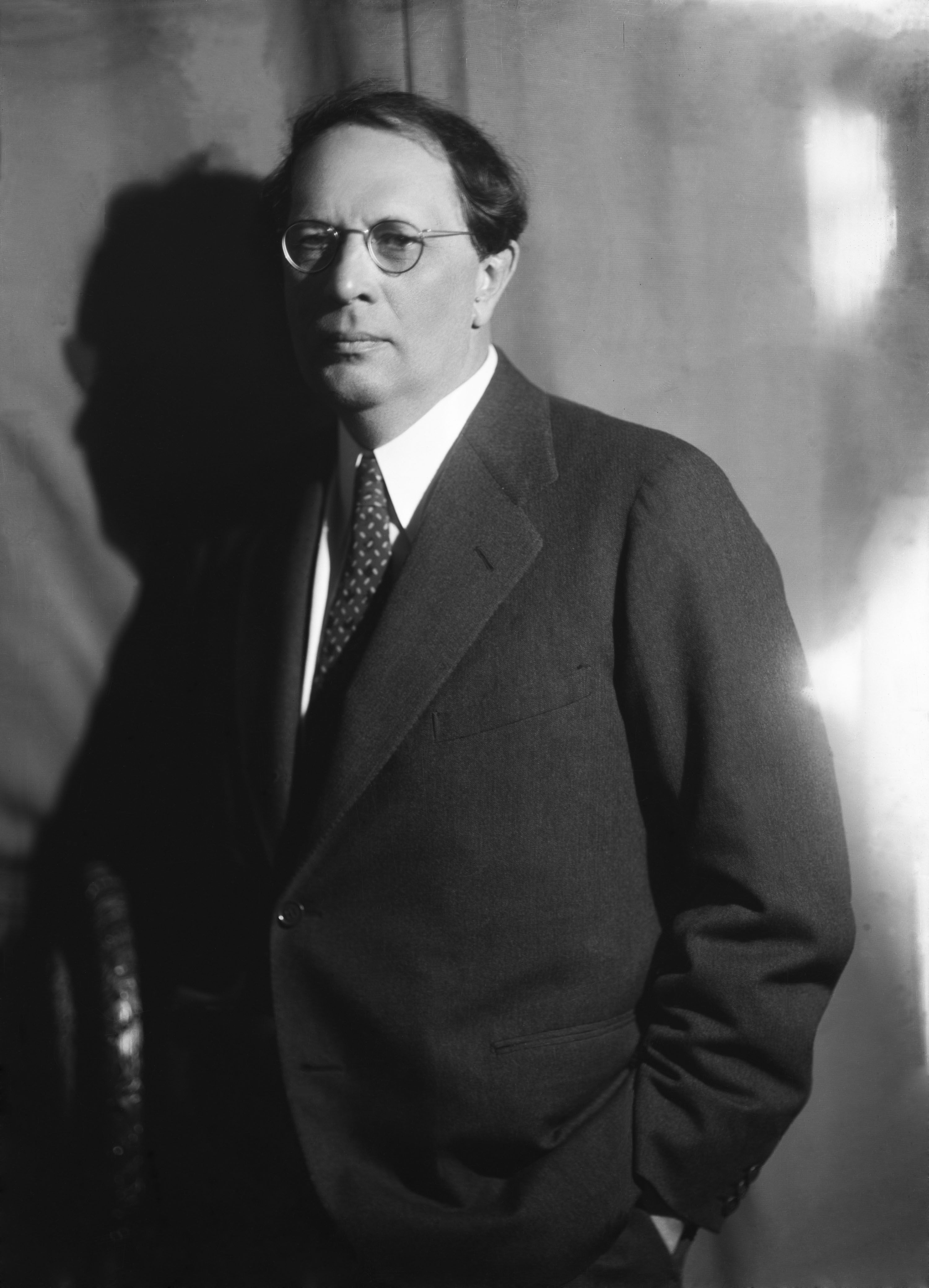
Alexei Tolstoy's review set the official tone toward the Fifth Symphony.

==== Official ====
An article by the composer appeared in the newspaper Vechernyaya Moskva on January 25, 1938, a few days before the Moscow premiere of the Fifth Symphony:

Among the reviews, which often analyzed the work in thorough detail, one that particularly delighted me stated that the Fifth Symphony was a Soviet artist's no-nonsense response to fair criticism.

Official critics treated the symphony as a turnaround in its composer's career. Like the Pravda attack at that time on the opera Lady Macbeth of the Mtsensk District, the political basis for extolling the Fifth Symphony was to show how the Party could make artists bow to its demands.

The official tone toward the Fifth Symphony was further set by a review by Alexei Tolstoy, who likened the symphony to the literary model of the Soviet Bildungsroman describing "the formation of a personality"—in other words, of a Soviet personality. In the first movement, the composer-hero suffers a psychological crisis giving rise to a burst of energy. The second movement provides respite. In the third movement, the personality begins to form: "Here the personality submerges itself in the great epoch that surrounds it, and begins to resonate with the epoch." With the finale, Tolstoy wrote, came victory, "an enormous optimistic lift". As for the ecstatic reaction of the audience to the work, Tolstoy claimed it showed Shostakovich's perestroyka to be sincere. "Our audience is organically incapable of accepting decadent, gloomy, pessimistic art. Our audience responds enthusiastically to all that is bright, clear, joyous, optimistic, life-affirming."

Not everyone agreed with Tolstoy, even after another article reportedly by the composer echoed Tolstoy's views. Boris Asafyev wrote, "This unsettled, sensitive, evocative music which inspires such gigantic conflict comes across as a true account of the problems facing modern man—not one individual or several, but mankind."

==== Public ====
During the first performance of the symphony, people were reported to have wept during the Largo movement. The music, steeped in an atmosphere of mourning, contained echoes of the panikhida, the Russian Orthodox requiem. It also recalled a genre of Russian symphonic works written in memory of the dead, including pieces by Glazunov, Steinberg, Rimsky-Korsakov and Stravinsky.

=== Symphony as artistic salvation ===
After the symphony had been performed in Moscow, Heinrich Neuhaus called the work "deep, meaningful, gripping music, classical in the integrity of its conception, perfect in form and the mastery of orchestral writing—music striking for its novelty and originality, but at the same time somehow hauntingly familiar, so truly and sincerely does it recount human feelings".

Shostakovich returned to the traditional four-movement form and a normal-sized orchestra. More tellingly, he organized each movement along clear lines, having concluded that a symphony cannot be a viable work without firm architecture. The harmonic idiom in the Fifth is less astringent, more tonal than previously, and the thematic material is more accessible. It has been said that, in the Fifth Symphony, the best qualities of Shostakovich's music, such as meditation, humor and grandeur, blend in perfect balance and self-fulfillment.

=== Post-Testimony response ===
The final movement is declared in Testimony to be a parody of shrillness, representing "forced rejoicing". In the words attributed to the composer in Testimony (a work which has had its authenticity questioned):

The rejoicing is forced, created under threat, as in Boris Godunov. It's as if someone were beating you with a stick and saying, "Your business is rejoicing, your business is rejoicing", and you rise, shaky, and go marching off, muttering, "Our business is rejoicing, our business is rejoicing."

The Fifth is one of Shostakovich's most played symphonies.
