= List of sonatas =

The following is an incomplete list of musical pieces that are sonatas.

== Baroque (ca 1600 – ca 1760) ==
- Marc-Antoine Charpentier
  - Sonata for 8 H 548 (date unknown)
- Johann Sebastian Bach
  - Sonatas for solo violin (BWV 1001, 1003 and 1005)
  - Sonatas for violin and continuo (BWV 1021, 1023), and the doubtful 1024
  - Sonatas for flute and continuo (BWV 1034, 1035)
  - Trio sonatas: for organ (BWV 525–530); for violin and harpsichord (BWV 1014–1019); for viola da gamba and harpsichord (BWV 1027–1029); for flute and harpsichord (BWV 1030, 1032); for flute, violin and continuo (Sonata sopr'il Soggetto Realeincluded in The Musical Offering)
- Heinrich Ignaz Franz Biber
  - Rosary Sonatas
- George Frideric Handel
  - Sonata for Violin and Continuo in D major (HWV 371)
- Élisabeth Jacquet de La Guerre
  - Sonatas (2), for violin, viola da gamba, and basso continuo (c. 1695)
  - Sonatas (6), for violin and basso continuo (1707)
- Giuseppe Tartini
  - Devil's Trill Sonata
- Arcangelo Corelli
  - Trio Sonatas op. 1–4
- Domenico Scarlatti
  - Keyboard sonata in E major L. 23
  - Keyboard sonata in B minor L. 33
  - Keyboard sonata in C major L. 104
  - Keyboard sonata in F minor L. 118
  - Keyboard sonata in A minor L. 241
  - Keyboard sonata in D minor L. 266
  - Keyboard sonata in G major L. 349
  - Keyboard sonata in C minor L. 352
  - Keyboard sonata in D minor L. 422
  - Keyboard sonata in B minor L. 449
  - Keyboard sonata in A major L. 483
  - Complete list
- Pietro Domenico Paradisi
  - Keyboard sonata in A major
- Jean-Féry Rebel
  - 12 sonates à 2 ou 3 parties, Book of twelve sonatas in 2 or 3 parts (composed in 1695, published in Paris in 1712)
  - 12 Sonates à violon seul mellées de plusieurs récits pour la viole, 12 sonatas for violin solo mixed with récits for viol, (Paris 1713)
- Jean-Marie Leclair
  - Op. 1 No. 1 – Violin Sonata in A minor
  - Op. 1 No. 2 – Violin Sonata in C major
  - Op. 1 No. 3 – Violin Sonata in B♭ major
  - Op. 1 No. 4 – Violin Sonata in D major
  - Op. 1 No. 5 – Violin Sonata in G major
  - Op. 1 No. 6 – Violin Sonata in E minor
  - Op. 1 No. 7 – Violin Sonata in F major
  - Op. 1 No. 8 – Violin Sonata in G major
  - Op.1 No. 9 – Violin Sonata in A major
  - Op. 1 No. 10 – Violin Sonata in D major
  - Op. 1 No. 11 – Violin Sonata in B♭ major
  - Op. 1 No. 12 – Violin Sonata in B minor
  - Op. 2 No. 1 – Violin Sonata in E minor
  - Op 2 No. 2 – Violin Sonata in F major
  - Op. 2 No. 3 – Violin Sonata in C major
  - Op. 2 No. 4 – Violin Sonata in A major
  - Op. 2 No. 5 – Violin Sonata in G major
  - Op. 2 No. 6 – Violin Sonata in D major
  - Op. 2 No. 7 – Violin Sonata in B♭ major
  - Op. 2 No. 8 – Violin Sonata in D major
  - Op. 2 No. 9 – Violin Sonata in E major
  - Op. 2 No. 10 – Violin Sonata in C minor
  - Op. 2 No. 11 – Violin Sonata in B minor
  - Op. 2 No. 12 – Violin Sonata in G minor
  - Op. 3 No. 1 – Sonata for 2 violins in G major
  - Op. 3 No. 2 – Sonata for 2 violins in A major
  - Op. 3 No. 3 – Sonata for 2 violins in C major
  - Op. 3 No. 4 – Sonata for 2 violins in F major
  - Op. 3 No. 5 – Sonata for 2 violins in E minor
  - Op. 3 No. 6 – Sonata for 2 violins in D major
  - Op. 5 No. 1 – Violin Sonata in A major
  - Op. 5 No. 2 – Violin Sonata in F major
  - Op. 5 No. 3 – Violin Sonata in E minor
  - Op. 5 No. 4 – Violin Sonata in B♭ major
  - Op. 5 No. 5 – Violin Sonata in B minor
  - Op. 5 No. 6 – Violin Sonata in C minor
  - Op. 5 No. 7 – Violin Sonata in A minor
  - Op. 5 No. 8 – Violin Sonata in D major
  - Op. 5 No. 9 – Violin Sonata in E major
  - Op. 5 No. 10 – Violin Sonata in C major
  - Op. 5 No. 11 – Violin Sonata in G minor
  - Op. 5 No. 12 – Violin Sonata in G major
  - Op. 9 No. 1 – Violin Sonata in A major
  - Op. 9 No. 2 – Violin Sonata in E minor
  - Op. 9 No. 3 – Violin Sonata in D major
  - Op. 9 No. 4 – Violin Sonata in A major
  - Op. 9 No. 5 – Violin Sonata in A minor
  - Op. 9 No. 6 – Violin Sonata in D major
  - Op. 9 No. 7 – Violin Sonata in G major
  - Op. 9 No. 8 – Violin Sonata in C major
  - Op. 9 No. 9 – Violin Sonata in E♭ major
  - Op. 9 No. 10 – Violin Sonata in F♯ minor
  - Op. 9 No. 11 – Violin Sonata in G minor
  - Op. 9 No. 12 – Violin Sonata in G major

== Classical (ca 1760 – ca 1830) ==
- Haydn
  - Sonata in C major (H. XVI:3 / WU 14) (c1765)
  - Sonata in D major (H. XVI:19 / WU 30) (1767)
  - Sonata in C minor (H. XVI:20 / WU 33) (1771)
  - Sonata in F major (H. XVI:23 / WU 38) (1773)
  - Sonata in B minor (H. XVI:32 / WU 47) (before 1776)
  - Sonata in E minor (H. XVI:34 / WU 53) (before 1784)
  - Sonata in G major (H. XVI:40 / WU 54) (before 1784)
  - Sonata in A♭ major (H. XVI:46) (1771)
  - Sonata in C major (H. XVI:48 / WU 58) (1789)
  - Sonata in C major (H. XVI:50 / WU 60) (c1794/5)
  - Sonata in E♭ major (H. XVI:52 / WU 62) (1794)
- Chevalier de Saint-Georges
  - Three Sonatas for keyboard with violin: B♭, A, and G minor, Op. 1a (c1770)
  - Sonata for harp with flute obligato, in E♭ major
  - Sonata for harpsichord with violin obligato, in G major
  - Six Sonatas for violin accompanied by a second violin: B♭, E♭, A, G, B♭, A: Op. posth. Pleyel (1800)
  - Cello Sonata, lost, mentioned by a review in the Gazette du departement du Nord, April 10, 1792.
- Salieri
  - Piano Sonata in C major (?1783)
- Boccherini
- Six Sonatas for violin and continuo, Op. 5 (1768)
- Six Sonatas for cello and continuo (1770)
- At least seventeen more sonatas for cello and continuo
- Sonata for two cellos in C major
- Sonata for two cellos in E♭ major
- Leopold Mozart
  - Piano Sonata in F major, S. 1.1 (1759)
  - Piano Sonata in B♭ major, S 1.2 (1760)
  - Piano Sonata in C, S. 1.3 (1759 or earlier)
- Wolfgang Amadeus Mozart
  - Piano Sonata in E♭ major (K. 282/189f – see Köchel-Verzeichnis) – Has an unusual adagio as the first movement.
  - Piano Sonata in A major (K. 331/300i)
  - Piano Sonata in B♭ major (K. 333/315c)
  - Piano Sonata in C major (K. 545)
  - Piano Sonata in B♭ major (K.570) – Considered by many to be Mozart's finest piano sonata
- Franz Xaver Wolfgang Mozart
  - Sonata No. 1 for violin and piano in B♭ major, Op. 7 (1808)
  - Sonata No. 2 for violin and piano in F major, Op.15 (1813)
  - Grande sonate for violin or cello and piano in E major, Op.19 (1820)
  - Rondo (Sonata) for flute and piano
  - Sonata for piano, Op. 10 (1808)
- Clementi
  - Sonata, Op. 2, No. 1
  - Sonata in B♭, Op. 12, No.1
  - Sonata in E♭, Op. 12, No.2
  - Sonata in E♭, Op. 12, No.4
  - Sonata in F minor, Op. 13, No. 2
  - Sonata in B♭ major, Op. 24, No. 2 – The melody from this sonata was used by Mozart in his "Magic Flute" Overture.
  - Sonata in E♭, Op. 24, No.3
  - Sonata in G, Op. 25, No.2
  - Sonata in F♯, Op. 26, No.2
  - Sonata in D, Op. 26, No.3
  - Sonata in C, Op. 34, No.1
  - Sonata, Op. 36, No. 1
  - Sonata, Op. 36, No. 2
  - Sonata, Op. 36, No. 3
  - Sonata in G, Op. 37, No. 2
  - Sonata, Op. 40, No. 1
  - Sonata, Op. 40, No. 2
  - Sonata, Op. 40, No. 3
  - Sonata, Op. 47, No. 2
  - Sonata, Op. 50, No. 1
  - Sonata, Op. 50, No. 2
  - Sonata, Op. 50, No. 3
- Dussek
  - Sonata in C minor, Op. 35, No. 3, C. 151
  - Sonata F♯ minor, Elégie harmonique, Op. 61, C. 211
  - Sonata in A♭ major, Le Retour à Paris Op. 64, C. 221
- Beethoven
  - Sonata No. 2 for Cello and Piano, Op. 5, No. 2, in G minor
  - Piano Sonata No. 1, Op. 2, No. 1
  - Piano Sonata No. 2, Op. 2, No. 2
  - Piano Sonata No. 3, Op. 2, No. 3
  - Piano Sonata No. 4, Op. 7
  - Piano Sonata No. 5, Op. 10, No. 1
  - Piano Sonata No. 6, Op. 10, No. 2
  - Piano Sonata No. 7, Op. 10, No. 3
  - Piano Sonata No. 8, Op. 13 "Pathétique"
  - Piano Sonata No. 9, Op. 14, No. 1
  - Piano Sonata No. 10, Op. 14, No. 2
  - Piano Sonata No. 11, Op. 22
  - Piano Sonata No. 12, Op. 26 "Funeral March"
  - Piano Sonata No. 13, Op. 27, No. 1 "Sonata quasi una Fantasia"
  - Piano Sonata No. 14, Op. 27, No. 2 "Moonlight"
  - Piano Sonata No. 15, Op. 28 "Pastoral"
  - Piano Sonata No. 16, Op. 31, No. 1
  - Piano Sonata No. 17, Op. 31, No. 2 "Tempest"
  - Piano Sonata No. 18, Op. 31, No. 3 "The Hunt"
  - Piano Sonata No. 19, Op. 49, No. 1 (easy sonata)
  - Piano Sonata No. 20, Op. 49, No. 2 (easy sonata)
  - Piano Sonata No. 21, Op. 53 "Waldstein"
  - Piano Sonata No. 22, Op. 54
  - Piano Sonata No. 23, Op. 57 "Appassionata"
  - Piano Sonata No. 24, Op. 78
  - Piano Sonata No. 25, Op. 79
  - Piano Sonata No. 26, Op. 81a "Les adieux"
  - Piano Sonata No. 27, Op. 90
  - Piano Sonata No. 28, Op. 101
  - Piano Sonata No. 29, Op. 106 "Hammerklavier"
  - Piano Sonata No. 30, Op. 109
  - Piano Sonata No. 31, Op. 110
  - Piano Sonata No. 32, Op. 111
  - Sonata for Violin and Piano in D major, op. 12, no. 1
  - Violin Sonata "Spring"
  - Violin Sonata "Kreutzer"
  - Horn Sonata, Op. 17
  - Flute Sonata, Anh. 4
- Danzi
  - Horn Sonata, Op. 28
  - Horn Sonata, Op. 44
  - Basset Horn Sonata, Op. 62
- Pietro Denis
  - Sonata for mandolin & continuo No. 1 in D major
  - Sonata No. 3 for mandolin
- Alexandro Marie Antoin Fridzeri
  - Six sonatas for the mandolin, Op. 3, published 1771, Paris
- Franz Schubert (see also Sonatas, duos and fantasies by Franz Schubert),
  - Sonata in F major for piano duet, D 1C
  - Sonata movement (Sonatensatz) in B♭ major for Piano Trio, D 28
  - Piano Sonata in E major, D 157
  - Piano Sonata in C major, D 279
  - Sonat(in)as for violin and piano, Op. 137: in D major, D 384 – in A minor, D 385 – in G minor, D 408
  - Piano Sonata in E major, D 459
  - Piano Sonata in A minor, D 537
  - Piano Sonata in A♭ major, D 557
  - Piano Sonata in E minor, D 566
  - Piano Sonata in D♭ major, D 568
  - Piano Sonata in E♭ major, D 568
  - Piano Sonata in F♯ minor, D 571
  - Violin Sonata (Duo) in A major, D 574
  - Piano Sonata in B major, D 575
  - Piano Sonata in C major, D 613
  - Sonata in B♭ major for piano four-hands, D 617
  - Piano Sonata in F minor, D 625
  - Piano Sonata in C♯ minor, D 655
  - Piano Sonata in A major, D 664
  - Piano Sonata in E minor, D 769A
  - Piano Sonata in A minor, D 784
  - Sonata in C major for piano four-hands, D 812
  - Arpeggione Sonata, D 821
  - Piano Sonata in C major, D 840
  - Piano Sonata in A minor, D 845
  - Piano Sonata in D major, D 850
  - Piano Sonata in G major, D 894
  - Schubert's last sonatas: Piano Sonata in C minor, D 958 – Piano Sonata in A major, D 959 – Piano Sonata in B♭ major, D 960

== Romantic (ca 1830 – ca 1900) ==
- Robert Schumann
  - Piano Sonata in F♯ minor, Op. 11
  - Piano Sonata in F minor, Op. 14
  - Violin Sonata No. 1 in A minor, Op. 105
  - Violin Sonata No. 2 in D minor, Op. 121
  - Piano Sonata No. 2 in G minor, Op. 22
- Frédéric Chopin
  - Piano Sonata No. 1 in C minor, Op. 4
  - Piano Sonata No. 2 in B♭ minor, Op. 35,
  - Piano Sonata No. 3 in B minor, Op. 58
  - Cello Sonata in G minor, Op. 65
- Felix Mendelssohn
  - Sonata in E major, Op. 6
  - Sonata in G minor, Op. 105
  - Sonata in B♭ major, Op. 106
  - Cello Sonata in B♭, Op. 45
  - Cello Sonata in D, Op. 58
  - Six Sonatas for Organ, Op. 65
- Fanny Hensel
  - Easter Sonata
- Franz Liszt
  - Sonata after a Reading of Dante (Fantasia Quasi Sonata)
  - Sonata in B minor
- Julius Reubke
  - Sonata in C minor, Psalm 94.
  - Piano Sonata in B♭ minor
- Johannes Brahms
  - Piano Sonata No. 1, Op. 1
  - Piano Sonata No. 2, Op. 2
  - Piano Sonata No. 3 in F minor, Op. 5
  - Violin Sonata No. 1, Op. 78 "Rain Sonata"
  - Violin Sonata No. 2, Op. 100
  - Violin Sonata No. 3, Op. 108
  - Cello Sonata No. 1, Op. 38
  - Cello Sonata No. 2, Op. 99
  - Clarinet Sonata No. 1, Op. 120/1
  - Clarinet Sonata No. 2, Op. 120/2
- César Cui
  - Sonata for Violin and Piano, Op. 84
- Mily Balakirev
  - Two piano sonatas:
    - No. 1, in B♭ minor, Op. 5 (unfinished)
    - No. 2 in B♭ minor, Op. 102 (1905)
- Pyotr Ilyich Tchaikovsky
  - Piano Sonata in G, Op. 37 "Grande Sonate"
- Sergei Rachmaninoff
  - Cello Sonata in G minor
  - Piano Sonata No. 1 in D minor
  - Piano Sonata No. 2 in B♭ minor
- César Franck
  - Violin Sonata in A (sometimes played on cello or flute)
- Edvard Grieg
  - Piano Sonata, Op. 7
  - Violin Sonata No. 1 in F major, Op. 8
  - Violin Sonata No. 2 in G major, Op. 13
  - Violin Sonata No. 3 in C minor, Op. 45
  - Cello Sonata in A minor, Op. 36
- Camille Saint-Saëns
  - Violin Sonata No. 1, Op. 75
  - Violin Sonata No. 2, Op. 102
  - Cello Sonata No. 1, Op. 32
  - Cello Sonata No. 2, Op. 123
  - Bassoon Sonata, Op. 168
  - Clarinet Sonata, Op. 167
  - Oboe Sonata in D major, Op. 166
- Gabriel Fauré
  - Violin Sonata No. 1 (1875)
  - Violin Sonata No. 2 (1916)
  - Cello Sonata No. 1 (1917)
  - Cello Sonata No. 2 (1921)
- Edward Elgar
  - Organ Sonata in G major, Op. 28
  - Violin Sonata, Op. 82
- Joseph Jongen
  - Sonate Eroïca, Op. 94

== 20th century (including contemporary) (ca 1900–2011) ==
- George Antheil
  - "Airplane" Sonata
- Samuel Barber
  - Cello Sonata
  - Piano Sonata
- Jean Barraqué
  - Piano Sonata (1950–52)
- Béla Bartók
  - Piano Sonata
  - Sonata for Solo Violin
  - Sonata for Violin and Piano in E minor (1903)
  - Sonata for Violin and Piano No. 1, op. 21 (1921)
  - Sonata for Violin and Piano No. 2 (1922)
  - Sonata for Two Pianos and Percussion (1938)
- Alban Berg
  - Piano Sonata
- Leonard Bernstein
  - Clarinet Sonata
- Pierre Boulez
  - Piano Sonata No. 1
  - Piano Sonata No. 2
  - Piano Sonata No. 3
- Frank Bridge
  - Piano Sonata
  - Sonata for cello and piano
  - Sonata for violin and piano
- Elliott Carter
  - Piano Sonata
  - Cello Sonata
- Carlos Chávez
  - Piano Sonata No. 1 (Sonata fantasía) (1918)
  - Piano Sonata No. 2 (1919)
  - Piano Sonata No. 3 (1928)
  - Piano Sonata No. 4 (1941)
  - Piano Sonata No. 5 (1960)
  - Piano Sonata No. 6 (1961)
  - Sonata for four horns (1929)
- Rebecca Clarke
  - Sonata for Viola and Piano (1919)
- Aaron Copland
  - Piano Sonata
  - Violin Sonata (also arr. for clarinet and piano)
- John Corigliano
  - Violin Sonata
- Claude Debussy
  - Cello Sonata (Sonata No. 1)
  - Sonata for Flute, Viola and Harp (Sonata No. 2)
  - Violin Sonata (Sonata No. 3)
- Henri Dutilleux
  - Piano Sonata
- George Enescu
  - Sonata No. 1 for cello and piano, in F minor, Opus 26, No. 1 (1898)
  - Sonata No. 2 for cello and piano, in C major, Opus 26, No. 2 (1935)
  - Piano Sonata No. 1, Op. 24, No. 1
  - Piano Sonata No. 3, Op. 24, No. 3
  - Violin Sonata No. 1, Op. 2
  - Violin Sonata No. 2 in F minor, Op. 6 (1899)
  - Violin Sonata No. 3, Op. 25 "In Romanian Folk Style"
- Iván Erőd
  - 1st Violin Sonata Op. 14 (1969–79)
  - 2nd Violin Sonata Op. 74 (2000)
- Alberto Ginastera
  - Sonata No. 1 for Piano (1952)
  - Sonata No. 2 for Piano (1981)
  - Sonata No. 3 for Piano (1982)
  - Sonata for Cello and Piano (1979)
  - Sonata for Guitar (1976, rev. 1981)
- Karel Goeyvaerts
  - Sonata for Two Pianos, Op. 1
- Otar Gordeli
  - Piano Sonata (1960)
- Paul Hindemith
  - Harp Sonata (1939)
  - Piano Sonata, Op. 17 (1920)
  - Piano Sonata No. 1 in A (1936)
  - Piano Sonata No. 2 in G (1936)
  - Piano Sonata No. 3 in B♭ (1936)
  - Sonata for Piano Four-Hands (1938)
  - Sonata for Two Pianos (1942)
  - Organ Sonata No. 1 (1937)
  - Organ Sonata No. 2 (1937)
  - Organ Sonata No. 3, "nach alten Volksliedern" (1940)
  - Sonata for Flute and Piano (1936)
  - Sonata for Oboe and Piano (1938)
  - Sonata for English Horn and Piano (1941)
  - Sonata for Clarinet and Piano (1939)
  - Sonata for Bassoon and Piano (1938)
  - Sonata for Alto Horn in E♭ and Piano
  - Sonata for Horn in F and Piano (1939)
  - Sonata for Four Horns (1952)
  - Sonata for Trumpet and Piano
  - Sonata for Trombone and Piano (1941)
  - Sonata for Bass Tuba and Piano (1955)
  - Sonata No. 1 for Violin Solo, Op. 11, No. 6, in G minor (1917)
  - Sonata No. 2 for Violin Solo, Op. 31, No. 1 (1924)
  - Sonata No. 3 for Violin Solo, "Es ist so schönes Wetter draussen", Op. 31, No. 2 (1924)
  - Sonata No. 1 for Violin and Piano, Op. 11, No. 1, in E♭ major (1918)
  - Sonata No. 2 for Violin and Piano, Op. 11, No. 2, in D major (1918)
  - Sonata No. 3 for Violin and Piano in E major (1935)
  - Sonata No. 4 for Violin and Piano in C major (1939)
  - Sonata No. 1 for Viola Solo, Op. 11, No. 5 (1919)
  - Sonata No. 2 for Viola Solo, Op. 25, No. 1 (1922)
  - Sonata No. 3 for Viola Solo, Op. 31, No. 4 (1923)
  - Sonata No. 4 for Viola Solo (1937)
  - Sonata No. 1 for Viola and Piano, Op. 11, No. 4 (1919)
  - Sonata No. 2 for Viola and Piano, Op. 25, No. 4 (1922)
  - Sonata No. 3 for Viola and Piano (1939)
  - Kleine Sonata for Viola d'Amore and Piano, Op. 25, No. 2 (1922)
  - Sonata for Cello Solo, Op. 25, No. 3 (1923)
  - Sonata No. 1 for Cello and Piano, Op. 11, No. 3 (1919, rev. 1921)
  - Sonata No. 2 for Cello and Piano (1948)
  - Sonata for Double Bass and Piano (1949)
- Herbert Howells
  - Two sonatas for organ
  - Sonatas for clarinet, oboe, and piano
- John Ireland
  - Piano Sonata
- Charles Ives
  - Sonata No. 2 for Piano: Concord, Mass., 1840–60
- Leoš Janáček
  - Piano Sonata "1.X.1905"
  - Violin Sonata
- Betsy Jolas
  - Sonate à 8, for cello octet (1998)
- Vítězslava Kaprálová
  - Sonata Appassionata, op. 6 for piano (1933)
- Nikolai Kapustin
  - 20 Piano Sonatas
    - No. 1 in D major "Sonata-Fantasy", Op. 39 (1984)
    - No. 2 in E major, Op. 54 (1989)
    - No. 3, Op. 55 (1990)
    - No. 4, Op. 60 (1991)
    - No. 5, Op. 61 (1991)
    - No. 6, Op. 62 (1991)
    - No. 7, Op. 64 (1991)
    - No. 8, Op. 77 (1995)
    - No. 9, Op. 78 (1995)
    - No. 10, Op. 81 (1996)
    - No. 11, Op. 101 (2000)
    - No. 12, Op. 102 (2001)
    - No. 13, Op. 110 (2003)
    - No. 14, Op. 120 (2004)
    - No. 11, Op. 101 (2000)
    - No. 15 "Fantasia quasi Sonata", Op. 127 (2005)
    - No. 16, Op. 131 (2006)
    - No. 17, Op. 134 (2008)
    - No. 18, Op. 135 (2008)
    - No. 19, Op. 143 (2011)
    - No. 20, Op. 144 (2011)
  - Sonata for cello and piano No. 1, Op. 63 (1991)
  - Sonata for viola and piano, Op. 69 (1992)
  - Sonata for violin and piano, Op. 70 (1992)
  - Sonata for cello and piano No. 2, Op. 84 (1997)
- Aram Khachaturian
  - Sonata for Violin and Piano (1932)
  - Sonata-Fantasia for unaccompanied cello (1974)
  - Sonata-Monologue for unaccompanied violin (1975)
  - Sonata-Song for solo viola (1976)
  - Piano Sonata (1961)
- Tikhon Khrennikov
  - Sonata for Cello and piano, Op. 34 (1989)
- Zoltán Kodály
  - Sonata for Solo Cello
- Ernst Krenek
  - Seven piano sonatas in different styles
- Claus Kühnl
  - Sonatas 1–10 (2005–2008) for Piano
- Dieter Lehnhoff
  - Hai-kai, Op. 24 (2001), sonata for piano
  - Sonata Urbana, Op. 30 (2010) for clarinet (or viola) and piano
  - Sonata Porteña, Op. 35 (2013) for flute and piano
- Bohuslav Martinů
  - Flute Sonata No. 1
- Nikolai Medtner
  - 14 piano sonatas
    - No. 1 in F minor, Op. 5 (1901-3)
    - No. 2 in A♭, Op. 11 (1904-7)
    - No. 3 in D minor, Sonate-Elegie, Op. 11 (1904-7)
    - No. 4 in C, Op. 11 (1904-7)
    - No. 5 in G minor, Op. 22 (1909–10)
    - No. 6 in C minor, Sonata-Skazka, Op. 22 (1910–11)
    - No. 7 in E minor, Night Wind, Op. 22 (1910–11)
    - No. 8 in F♯, Sonata-Ballade, Op. 27 (1912–14)
    - No. 9 in A minor, War Sonata, Op. 30 (1914–17)
    - No. 10 in A minor, Sonata-reminiscenza, Op. 38 No. 1 (1920)
    - No. 11 in C minor, Sonata Tragica, Op. 39, No. 5 (1920)
    - No. 12 in B♭ minor, Romantica, Op. 53 No. 1 (1930)
    - No. 13 in F minor, Minacciosa, Op. 53, No. 2 (1930)
    - No. 14 in G, Sonata-Idyll, Op. 56 (1937)
  - Violin Sonata No. 1 in B minor, Op. 21 (1909–10)
  - Violin Sonata No. 2 in G major, Op. 44 (1922–25)
  - Violin Sonata No. 3 in E minor, Epica, Op. 57 (1938)
- Alexander Mosolov
  - Five piano sonatas
    - No. 1, Op. 3 (1924)
    - No. 2, Op. 4 (1923–24)
    - No. 3, Op. 6 (1924)
    - No. 4, Op. 11 (1925)
    - No. 5, Op. 12 (1925)
  - Sonata for Viola and Piano, Op. 21a
  - Sonata for Cello and Piano (1927)
- Nikolai Myaskovsky
  - Two sonatas for cello and piano:
    - No. 1, in D major, Op. 12 (1911, rev. 1935)
    - No. 2, n A minor, Op. 81 (1948)
  - Sonata for Violin and Piano in F major, Op. 70 (1946)
  - Nine piano sonatas:
    - No. 1 in D minor, Op. 6 (1907)
    - No. 2 in F♯ minor, Op. 13 (1912)
    - No. 3 in C minor, Op. 19 (1920; second version 1939)
    - No. 4 in C minor, Op. 27 (1924; revised 1945)
    - No. 5 in B major, Op. 64, No. 1 (1944 revision of an early sonata from 1907)
    - No. 6 in A♭ major, Op. 64, No. 2 (1944 revision of an early sonata)
    - No. 7 in C major, Op. 82 (1948)
    - No. 8 in D minor, Op. 83 (1949)
    - No. 9 in F major, Op. 84 (1949)
- Dora Pejačević
  - Sonata in D major, op. 26 for violin and piano (1909)
  - Sonata in E minor, op. 35 for violoncello and piano (1913)
  - Sonata in B minor, op. 36 (1914)
  - Sonata in A♭ major, op. 57 for piano (1921)
- Vincent Persichetti
  - Sonata for Solo Violin, Op. 10 (1940)
  - Sonata for Solo Cello, Op. Op. 54 (1952)
  - Sonata for Organ, Op. 86 (1960)
  - Twelve piano sonatas:
    - No. 1, Op.3 (1939)
    - No. 2, Op. 6 (1939)
    - No. 3, Op. 22 (1943)
    - No. 4, Op. 36 (1949)
    - No. 5, Op. 37 (1949)
    - No. 6, Op. 39 (1950)
    - No. 7, Op. 40 (1950)
    - No. 8, Op. 41 (1950)
    - No. 9, Op. 58 (1952)
    - No. 10, Op. 67 (1955)
    - No. 11, Op. 101 (1965)
  - Nine harpsichord sonatas:
    - No. 1, Op. 52 (1951)
    - No. 2, Op. 146 (1981)
    - No. 3, Op. 149 (1981)
    - No. 4, Op. 151 (1982)
    - No. 5, Op. 152 (1982)
    - No. 6, Op. 154 (1982)
    - No. 7, Op. 156 (1983)
    - No. 8, Op. 158 (1984)
    - No. 9, Op. 163 (1985)
    - No. 12, (Mirror Sonata) Op. 145 (1982)
- Walter Piston
  - Sonata for Piano (1926)
  - Sonata for Flute and Piano (1930)
  - Sonata for Violin and Piano (1939)
- Francis Poulenc
  - Sonata for two clarinets, FP 7 (1918/1945)
  - Sonata for clarinet and bassoon, FP 32 (1922/1945)
  - Sonata for horn, trumpet and trombone, FP 33 (1922/1945)
  - Violin Sonata, FP 119 (1942–43/1949)
  - Cello Sonata, FP 143 (1940–48)
  - Flute Sonata, FP 164 (1956–57)
  - Clarinet Sonata, FP 184 (1962)
  - Oboe Sonata, FP 185 (1962)
- Gerhard Präsent
  - Sonata del Gesù for violin and piano Op.35 (1997–99)
  - Sonata al dente for cello and piano Op.23 (1988–90)
- Florence Beatrice Price
  - Sonata in E minor for piano (1932)
- Sergei Prokofiev
  - Piano Sonata No. 1 in F minor, Op. 1 (1908).
  - Piano Sonata No. 2 in D minor, Op. 14 (1912).
  - Piano Sonata No. 3 in A minor, Op. 28 (1917).
  - Piano Sonata No. 4 in C minor, Op. 29 (1917).
  - Piano Sonata No. 5 in C major, Op. 38 (1923)/135 (rev. 1952–53).
  - Piano Sonata No. 6 in A major, Op. 82 (1940).
  - Piano Sonata No. 7 in B♭ major, Op. 83 (1942) ("Stalingrad")
  - Piano Sonata No. 8 in B♭ major, Op. 84 (1944).
  - Piano Sonata No. 9 in C major, Op. 103 (1947).
  - Piano Sonata No. 10 in E minor, Op. 137 (1952) (unfinished).
  - Piano Sonata No. 11 (unrealised).
  - Violin Sonata No. 1
  - Violin Sonata No. 2 (after Flute Sonata)
  - Cello Sonata
- Maurice Ravel
  - Violin Sonata
  - Sonata for Violin and Violoncello
- Max Reger
  - Seven Sonatas for Solo Violin, Op. 91
  - Nine Sonatas for Violin and Piano
  - Five Sonatas for Cello and Piano
  - Three Sonatas for Clarinet and Piano
- Alexander Scriabin
  - Piano Sonata No. 1
  - Piano Sonata No. 2
  - Piano Sonata No. 3
  - Piano Sonata No. 4
  - Piano Sonata No. 5
  - Piano Sonata No. 6
  - Piano Sonata No. 7 "White Mass"
  - Piano Sonata No. 8
  - Piano Sonata No. 9 "Black Mass"
  - Piano Sonata No. 10
- Roger Sessions
  - Piano Sonatas 1, 2, 3
  - Solo Violin Sonata
- Dmitri Shostakovich
  - Piano Sonata No. 1, Op. 12 (1926).
  - Cello Sonata, Op. 40 (1934).
  - Piano Sonata No. 2 in Bm, Op. 61 (1943).
  - Violin and Piano Sonata, Op. 134 (1968).
  - Viola and Piano Sonata, Op.147 (1975).
- Harry Somers
  - Piano Sonata No. 1: Testament of Youth (1945)
  - Piano Sonata No. 2 (1946)
  - Piano Sonata No. 3 (1950)
  - Piano Sonata No. 4 (1950)
  - Piano Sonata No. 5 (1957)
- Tim Souster
  - Sonata for cello, piano, seven winds, and percussion
- Leo Sowerby
  - Three sonatas for violin and piano
    - No. 1 in A major
    - No. 2 in B♭ major (1922)
    - No. 3 in D major
  - Sonata for Cello and Piano (1920)
  - Sonata for Viola and Piano (also playable on clarinet)
  - Piano Sonata in D major (1948, rev. 1964)
  - Sonata for Trumpet and Piano (1958)
  - Sonata for Clarinet and Piano (1944)
- Igor Stravinsky
  - Piano Sonata
  - Sonata for two pianos
- Stjepan Sulek
  - Sonate Vox Gabrieli, for trombone and piano (1973–1978)
- Germaine Tailleferre
  - Sonata No. 1 for violin and piano (1921)
  - Sonata No. 2 for violin and piano (1951)
  - Sonata for harp (1953)
  - Sonata alla Scarlatti, for harp (1964)
  - Sonata for solo clarinet (1957)
  - Sonata for two pianos (1974)
  - Sonata for piano four hands (1975)
- Boris Tchaikovsky
  - Sonata for Cello and Piano (1957)
  - Sonata for Violin and Piano (1959)
  - Two piano sonatas:
    - No. 1 (1944)
    - No. 2 (1952)
  - Sonata for Two Pianos (1973)
- Galina Ustvolskaya
  - Piano Sonata No. 1 (1947)
  - Piano Sonata No. 2 (1949)
  - Piano Sonata No. 3 (1952)
  - Piano Sonata No. 4 (1957)
  - Piano Sonata No. 5 (1986)
  - Piano Sonata No. 6 (1988)
- Heitor Villa-Lobos
  - Sonate-fantaisie No. 1 for violin and piano, Desesperança ("Despair") (1913)
  - Sonate-fantaisie No. 2 for violin and piano (1914)
  - Sonata No. 3 for violin and piano (1920)
- George Walker
  - Piano Sonata No. 4
- William Walton
  - Violin Sonata
- Mieczysław Weinberg
  - Sonata for Bassoon Solo, Op. 133
  - Sonata for Clarinet (or Viola) and Piano, Op. 28 (1945)
  - Two sonatas for cello and piano:
    - No. 1 in C major, Op. 21 (1945)
    - No. 2 in C major (1958–59)
  - Four sonatas for cello solo
    - No. 1, Op. 72 (1960)
    - No. 2, Op. 86 (1965); second version, as Op. 121 (1977)
    - No. 3, Op. 106 (1971)
    - No. 4, Op. 140 (1986)
  - Sonata for double-bass solo, Op. 108 (1971)
  - Six piano sonatas
    - No. 1, Op. 5 (1940)
    - No. 2, Op. 8 (1942)
    - No. 3, Op. 31 (1946)
    - No. 4, in B minor, Op. 56 (1955)
    - No. 5, Op. 58 (1956)
    - No. 6, Op. 73 (1960)
  - Six sonatas for violin and piano:
    - No. 1, Op. 12 (1943)
    - No. 2, Op. 15 (1944)
    - No. 3, Op. 37 (1947)
    - No. 4, Op. 39 (1947)
    - No. 5, Op. 53 (1953)
    - No. 6, Op. 136bis (1982)
  - Three sonatas for violin solo:
    - No. 1, Op. 82 (1964)
    - No. 2, Op. 95 (1967)
    - No. 3, Op. 126 (1979)
  - Sonata for Two Violins, Op. 69 (1959)
  - Four sonatas for viola solo:
    - No. 1, Op. 107 (1971)
    - No. 2, Op. 123 (1978)
    - No. 3, Op. 135 (1982)
    - No. 4, Op. 136 (1983)
- Eugène Ysaÿe
  - Six Violin Sonatas, Op. 27
