= Symphony No. 3 (Ustvolskaya) =

Symphony by Galina Ustvolskaya

Symphony No. 3 (subtitled "Jesus Messiah, Save Us!") by Russian composer Galina Ustvolskaya was composed in 1983, and published in 1990.

The premiere was given by the Leningrad Philharmonic Orchestra in Leningrad conducted by Vladimir Altschuler with Oleg Popkov as reciter on 1 October 1987.

It is scored for: groups of five oboes, trumpets, and double basses; a trombone; three tubas; two bass drums and tenor drums; piano; and a solo voice (reciter), which appeals in speech in Russian for salvation.

The work lasts approximately 13-15 minutes.

The symphony is based on the texts of the 11th-century German monk and musician Hermanus Contractus: the reciter repeating the invocation "Almighty, True God, Father of Eternal Life, Creator of the World, save us".

Ustvolskaya noted that there was an error in the published score - an incorrect piano glissando in bar 88 - which persisted despite her request for it to be corrected.

== Recordings ==
Megadisc Classics - Oleg Malov (reciter), Ural Philharmonic Orchestra, Dmitry Liss (conductor)
