= Symphony No. 2 (Ustvolskaya) =

The Symphony No. 2 (subtitled "True and Eternal Bliss!") by Russian composer Galina Ustvolskaya was composed in 1979 and published in 1982. It received its premiere on 8 October 1980 in Leningrad with the Leningrad Philharmonic Orchestra conducted by Vladimir Altschuler.

The symphony is scored for: groups of six flutes (no. 1 doubling piccolo), six oboes and six trumpets; single trombone, tuba and piano; bass drum, tenor drum and reciter. The work lasts approximately 18 minutes.

The symphony is based on the texts of the 11th-century German monk and musician Hermanus Contractus, the reciter repeating the words Господи (Gospodi, 'lord') and Истинная и благая Вечность, вечная же и благая Истина, истинная и вечная Благость! (istinnaya i blagaya vechnost, vechnaya i blagaya istina, istinnaya i blagaya blagost, 'true and excellent eternity, eternal and excellent truth, true and excellent goodness') between homophonic instrumental passages.

== Recordings ==
Megadisc Classics - Oleg Malov (reciter), Ural Philharmonic Orchestra, Dmitry Liss (conductor)
