= Symphony No. 5 (Ustvolskaya) =

Symphony No. 5 (subtitled "Amen") by Russian composer Galina Ustvolskaya was composed between 1989 and 1990.

Its premiere was given on 19 January 1991 in New York by Ensemble Continuum directed by Joel Sachs.

The symphony is scored for: oboe, trumpet, tuba, wooden cube, violin and reciter. The wooden cube is a percussion instrument designed by Ustvolskaya. It consists of an enclosed chipboard cube 43 cm x 43 cm, struck with wooden hammers or mallets.

A typical performance lasts approximately 13 minutes.

The text may be spoken in Russian, English or German. Despite some assertions, the text is not a "free interpretation" of The Lord's Prayer, but this Prayer as it is. The composer stressed that the reciter should pronounce it praying to God.

Ustvolskaya gave specific instructions in the score that the reciter, a man, should be dressed in black and not wearing jewelry.

Like the fourth symphony, this symphony consists of blocks of musical material, in this case four, which unfold one after the other without variation. The four blocks are unified by having their tonal focus on D-flat.

== Recordings ==
Megadisc Classics – Oleg Malov (reciter), The Saint Petersburg Soloists, Dmitry Liss (conductor)
RCA – Sergei Leiferkus (reciter), London Musici, Mark Stephenson (conductor)
