= Symphony No. 4 (Ustvolskaya) =

Russian symphony by Galina Ustvolskaya

Russian composer Galina Ustvolskaya's Symphony No. 4 (subtitled "Prayer") was composed between 1985 and 1987.

Its premiere was given by Dale Marrs (trumpet), Thomas Keemss (tam-tam), Ulrich Eisenlohr (piano) and Roswitha Sperber (contralto) in Heidelberg on 24 June 1988.

For a symphony the piece is exceptionally spare and short. It is scored for just four performers - trumpet, tam-tam, piano and contralto - and lasts between 6 and 8 minutes.

Like the second and third symphonies, the fourth symphony is based on the texts of the 11th-century German monk and musician Hermanus Contractus. The music of the symphony consists of three blocks or phrases which are repeated through various permutations whilst retaining a recognisable shape.

== Recordings ==
- Etcetera - The Barton Workshop
- Megadisc Classics - The Saint Petersburg Soloists, Dmitry Liss (conductor)
