= Boris Berezovsky (pianist) =

Russian pianist (born 1969)

Boris Berezovsky Бори́с Вади́мович Березо́вский
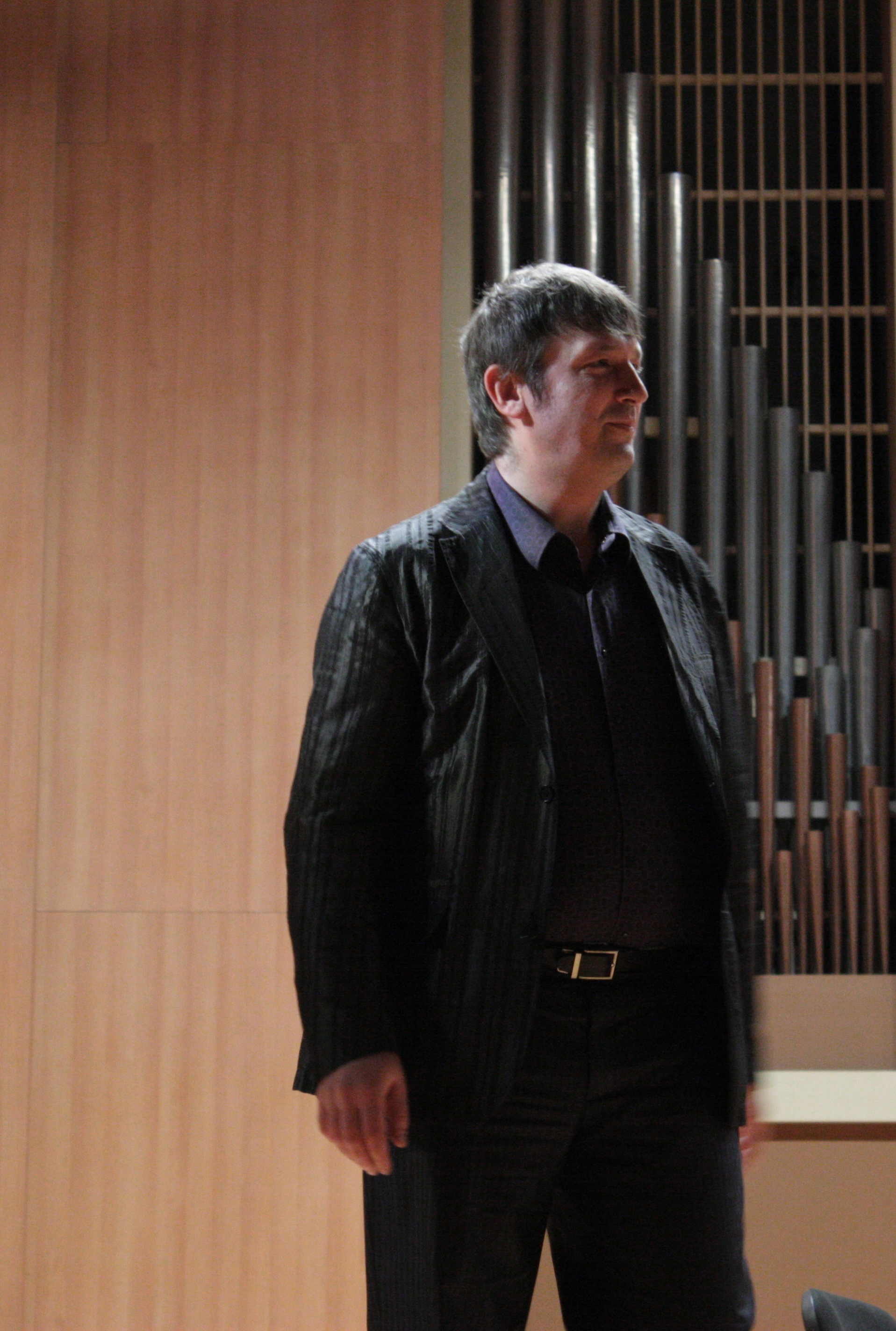
- Berezovsky during his concert in Tbilisi, Georgia, 2010

Background information
- Born: Boris Vadimovich Elyashberg; 4 January 1969 (age 57); Moscow, Russian SFSR, Soviet Union
- Genres: Classical music
- Occupation: Musician
- Instrument: Piano
- Years active: 1988–present
- Labels: Teldec, Apex, Erato, Simax, Koch, Warner Classics, Mirare

Boris Vadimovich Berezovsky (Russian: Борис Вадимович Березовский; born 4 January 1969) is a Russian pianist.

== Biography ==
Berezovsky's original name was Elyashberg, Boris Vadimovich. His parents changed the last name to Berezovsky when he was seven years old. He studied at the Moscow Conservatory with Eliso Virsaladze and privately with Alexander Satz. Following his London début at the Wigmore Hall in 1988, The Times described him as "an artist of exceptional promise, a player of dazzling virtuosity and formidable power." In 1990, he won First Prize at the International Tchaikovsky Competition.

In May 2005, he had his first solo recital in Théâtre des Champs-Élysées in Paris and played in the same venue in January 2006 with the Orchestre National de France. In January 2007, he played seven recitals "Carte Blanche" in the Louvre. In May 2009, he premiered Karol Beffa's "Piano concerto" in Toulouse, with Orchestre National du Capitole de Toulouse and Tugan Sokhiev as conductor.

== Career ==
Berezovsky has initiated and organized the International Medtner Festival that took place 2006 and 2007 in Moscow, Yekaterinburg and Vladimir.

== Controversy ==
On 10 March 2022 he went on Russian television to argue for the Russian Federation to commit war crimes in Ukraine by cutting off electricity and water in Kyiv. He claimed that the war in Ukraine was started by the West. He claimed that what the media in the West said was pure lies. He said he didn't care about what was happening in the West, and that he would definitely not go to the West for the next three years.

A few days later he expressed his regrets for the comments, saying he was cut off from explaining in full what he really meant to say. He also stated he did not condone the war.

On 17 March 2022 he was terminated by his concert agency Productions Internationales Albert Sarfati. Their statement concluded, "He recently spoke on a pure propaganda talkshow on a Russian TV channel. His comments shocked, upset and stunned all those who know the man and the artist. We too were completely unable to understand his stance. He has provided an explanation in a statement which he has asked us to convey. We have known for many years the qualities of the man and of course the exceptional artist. However, we strongly condemn the comments he made during his TV appearance and we must sadly suspend the representation of Boris Berezovsky by our company."

== Recordings ==
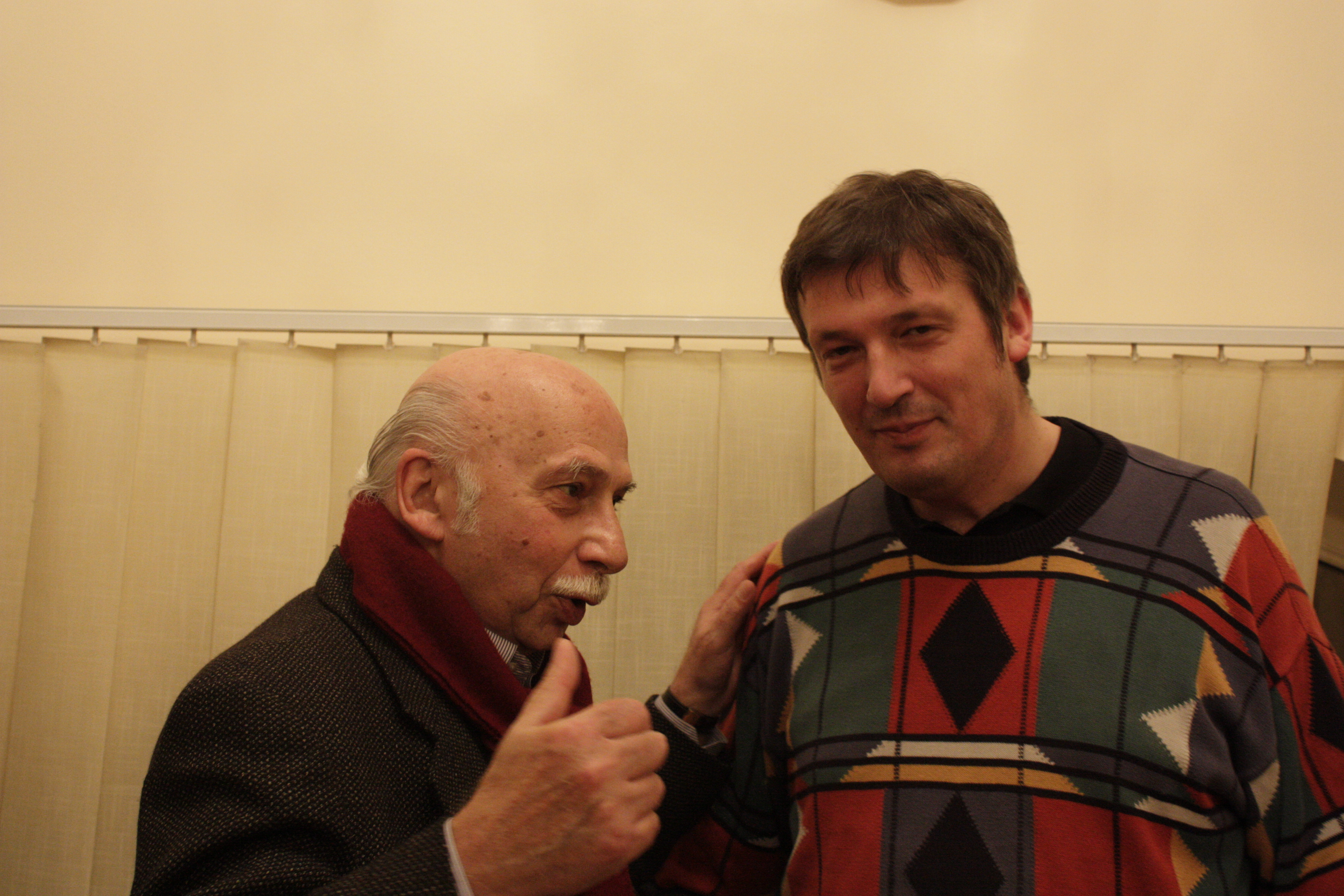
Georgian composer Giya Kancheli and Berezovsky in Tbilisi, after a concert at the Tbilisi State Conservatory in 2010

Berezovsky's has made recordings of the complete Beethoven Piano concertos with the Swedish Chamber Orchestra with Thomas Dausgaard. He has made records for Teldec, including solo discs of works by Chopin, Schumann, Rachmaninoff, Mussorgsky, Balakirev, Medtner, Ravel and the complete Liszt Transcendental Etudes.

With the Mirare Label, he has recorded the Rachmaninoff Préludes (May 2005) as well as that composer's complete Piano Concertos with the Ural Philharmonic Orchestra conducted by Dmitri Liss (August 2005). His album Tchaikovsky Piano Concerto No. 1 and Khachaturian Piano Concerto (Ural Philharmonic Orchestra/Dmitry Liss) was released in April 2006 in the UK.

The most recent recordings are Medtner Tales & Poems with Yana Ivanilova (soprano), Vassily Savenko (baritone) (Mirare 2008), Medtner Two pieces for two pianos, Op. 58, with Hamish Milne (piano) in: Medtner Complete Piano Sonatas; Piano Works — Vol. 7 (Brilliant Classics 2008), Rachmaninoff Suite No. 1 for two pianos, Op. 5 & Suite No. 2 for two pianos, Op. 17, with Brigitte Engerer (piano) (Mirare 2008). In 2010 Berezovsky released a record of his Liszt recital (Mirare 2008). His recording of selected works by Brahms (Piano Concerto No. 2, Variations on a Theme of Paganini, and Hungarian Dances Nos. 1, 2 & 4) was released in January 2011 (Mirare). More recently, Berezovsky released a recording of the Piano Concerto no. 2 by Tchaikovsky and other selected works (also with Mirare).

== CDs ==
- A trio consisting of Boris Berezovsky, Dmitri Makhtin, Alexander Kniazev recorded a DVD of Tchaikovsky pieces for piano, violin and cello and Rachmaninoff's Trio élégiaque “A la mémoire d’un grand artiste” presented on ARTE TV Channel and NHK in Japan. They received for this DVD the 4 stars Diapason d'Or.
- For Warner Classics International Boris Berezovsky recorded with the same trio the Shostakovich Trio No. 2 and Rachmaninoff Trio élégiaque No. 2 which were awarded Choc de la Musique in France, Gramophone in England, ECHO Klassik and Deutsche Schallplattenkritik in Germany.
- His solo live recording Chopin/Godowsky Etudes was released in January 2006 and won several awards such as the Diapason d'Or, RTL d'Or and BBC Music Magazine.
- His album of Paul Hindemith Ludus Tonalis and Suite 1922 (Warner Classics) was awarded ECHO Klassik as the best solo recording of "Music of the 20th — 21st Century".

== DVDs ==
- Boris Berezovsky — "Les Pianos de la Nuit". Liszt Transcendental Etudes, S. 139. Director: Andy Sommer. Filming: 4 August 2002 (Naïve 2003)
- Boris Berezovsky / Dmitri Makhtin / Alexander Kniazev — "Les Pianos De La Nuit". Tschaikovsky Seasons (No. 6); Nocturne in D minor, Op. 19, No. 4; Trio in A minor "A la mémoire d’un grand artiste", Op. 50; Serenade melancholique. Director: Andy Sommer. Filming: 10 August 2004 (Naïve 2006)
- Boris Berezovsky — "Change of Plans": Interview & Performance. Beethoven 33 Variationen C-Dur on Theme Antonio Diabelli, Op. 120; Medtner Tales, Op. 14, 20, 26, 34, 35, 48, 51; Llywelyn Improvisation on "Change of Plans"; Godovsky Altes Wien; Lyadov Preludes d-moll, Op. 40, No. 3 and G-Dur, Op. 46, No. 3, Bagatel As-Dur, Op. 53, No. 3. In: "Legato — The World Of Piano", Vol. 1. Director: Jan Schmidt-Garre. Filming: 14 July 2006 (Naxos 2007)

== Awards ==
Berezovsky won the gold medal at the 1990 International Tchaikovsky Competition in Moscow.
