= Symphony No. 1 (Ustvolskaya) =

1955 symphony by Galina Ustvolskaya

Galina Ustvolskaya at the piano, c. early 1950s

The Symphony No. 1 by Russian composer Galina Ustvolskaya was written in 1955.

It was premiered in Leningrad on 25 April 1966, eleven years after its composition, by the Leningrad Philharmonic Orchestra conducted by Arvīds Jansons.

The symphony is scored for piccolo, 3 flutes, 2 oboes, cor anglais, 4 clarinets, 3 bassoons, 4 horns, piccolo trumpet, 3 trumpets, trombone, tuba, timpani, percussion, harp, celesta, piano, strings, and 2 amplified boys' voices.

A typical performance lasts 20 minutes.

The symphony is cast in three movements. The outer two are instrumental. The central movement sets eight poems by Italian poet Gianni Rodari, translated into Russian and sung by two boys:

- N°1, Ciccio - the children living in a cave in close vicinity to a dumping ground
- N°2, Merry-go-round - the black child that can never know the happiness of white folks
- N°3, Saturday Night - the insufficient wages of the father
- N°4, The Youths of Modena - the children orphaned by the violent repression of a strike
- N°5, Buy Jumble - the rag-and-bone man
- N°6, The Waiting Room - the vagrant in the railway station
- N°7, When the Chimneys Die - unemployment
- N°8, Sun! - darkness without hope

The themes of the poems are racial, economic and other injustices in the United States of America, although Ustvolskaya denied these references and insisted that she did not choose the poems herself.

== Recordings ==
Megadisc Classics - Ural Philharmonic Orchestra, Dmitry Liss (conductor)
