= Op. 109 =

In music, Op. 109 stands for Opus number 109. Compositions that are assigned this number include:

- Beethoven – Piano Sonata No. 30
- Dvořák – The Golden Spinning Wheel
- Fauré – Cello Sonata No. 1
- Glazunov – Saxophone Concerto
- Schumann – Ball-Scenen (Scenes from a Ball) (piano 4 hands)
- Sibelius – The Tempest (Stormen), theatre score and a prelude plus two suites (1925, arranged 1927)
