= Piano Sonatas (Ustvolskaya) =

Galina Ustvolskaya at the piano, c. early 1950s

The six piano sonatas by Galina Ustvolskaya were composed over the course of 43 years – each showing a gradual progression of the composer's style.

The first sonata was written during her study with Shostakovich, but still retains a unique voice. According to Alex Ross, the works are evocative of the Rosicrucian mystical period of Satie. The following two were composed less than a decade later and involve more expressive dynamic markings and contrasts. The final two sonatas, written nearly thirty years after the Fourth Sonata, are perhaps the most shocking and violent expressions within her musical output.

== Sonata No. 1 ==
Sonata No. 1 (1947) is in four movements, usually taking about ten minutes to perform. As a whole, the work showcases her use of two-part counterpoint, repeated use of single-note values, and economical intensity of musical material.

== Sonata No. 2 ==
Sonata No. 2 in two parts (1949) features similar melodic material in its two movements that are expressed quite differently. The tempo relationships between the movements (quarter=80 vs. quarter=92) allows the movements to take different courses. The second movement features an extended climax, which utilizes repeated quarter notes and, over the course of three to four minutes, grows to a ffff dynamic. Despite this procession of quarter notes, the music retains Ustvolskaya's use of counterpoint, with each voice retaining its clarity.

== Sonata No. 3 ==
Sonata No. 3 (1952) is Ustvolskaya's longest out of the six. The work is based on three unresolved melodies, all presented within the first four minutes. According to Thom Jurek, the melodies "hang there, like prayers extended in supplication and as yet unanswered. This sonata is ever waiting upon the sweep of divine intervention yet continues dutifully, persistently in its sweetness as if not convinced it's already not too late. It engages silence at its end, as the last statement of mystery, without wonder or expectation, its part in the spiritual equation complete." The one-movement work has many tempo indications, but retains a brutal and obsessive quarter-note drive.

== Sonata No. 4 ==
Sonata No. 4 in four parts (1957) contains elements of Satie, Shostakovich, even Rachmaninov. Its architectural clarity of form is mixed with stark contrasts. The first movement opens with three bell-like chords and progresses through a withdrawn, extended pp passage. The fourth movement offers stand-alone polytonal phrases and intervals whose architecture dictates its form.

== Sonata No. 5 ==
The Fifth Sonata was composed 29 years after the Fourth and is in ten parts, performed without a break. As a whole, the sonata has an obsessive D♭4 that allows for cohesion of all the parts. Like the Sixth sonata, this work features chord clusters and violent dynamic contrasts – Alex Ross even commenting that, "she has colonized the higher end of the dynamic spectrum much as Morton Feldman took possession of the lower." The music also features an economical use of thematic material – mostly quarter notes in two-part counterpoint at a moderately slow tempo.

== Sonata No. 6 ==
Sonata No. 6 of 1988 is a physically violent work which utilizes thick chord clusters throughout. Because of its ffff clusters, musicologist Maria Cizmic explains, "It opens up a performance space in which a pianist feels pain, foregrounding the concrete bodily acts and sensations of suffering at a time when the violence of the USSR's past continued to be contested." Its first tempo indication, Espressivissimo, is one indication of its hyper-expressionality. Even through such dissonance, a number of melodies can be heard, usually the top note of each cluster. Before the final restatement of the first theme, a series of six chords, played as softly and chorale-like as possible, provides a moment of stillness.

== Recordings ==
- Tomoko Mukaiyama, BVHAAST (1994)
- Frank Denyer, Conifer Classics (1995)
- Marianne Schroeder, Hat Art (1995), Hat Hut Records (2011)
- Ivan Sokolov, Triton (1996), Piano Classics (2013)
- Markus Hinterhäuser, col legno (1998, 2012)
- Oleg Malov, Megadisc (2001)
- Sabine Liebner, Neos (2009)
- Natalia Andreeva, divine art (2017)
- Antonii Baryshevskyi, Avi-music (2017)
- Conor Hanick (2020)

Recordings by Frank Denyer, Ivan Sokolov and Markus Hinterhäuser were the composer's favorite.
