= Dafydd Llywelyn =

Dafydd Llywelyn may refer to:

- Dafydd Llywelyn (composer) (1939–2013), Welsh composer, pianist, conductor and teacher
- Dafydd Llywelyn (politician) (born 1976), Welsh politician and Dyfed-Powys Police and Crime Commissioner
- Dafydd Llewelyn (dramatist) (born 1968), Welsh dramatist, novelist, tv producer and drama commissioner for S4C
