= Op. 103 =

In music, Op. 103 stands for Opus number 103. Compositions that are assigned this number include:

- Beethoven – Octet
- Haydn - Quartet No. 68 in D minor
- Prokofiev – Piano Sonata No. 9
- Saint-Saëns – Piano Concerto No. 5
- Schumann – Mädchenlieder (2 women's voices and piano)
- Shostakovich – Symphony No. 11
