= Composition No. 1, subtitled Dona nobis pacem =

1970 chamber composition by Galina Ustvolskaya

Composition No. 1, subtitled Dona nobis pacem (Latin for "Grant us peace"), is a chamber composition for piccolo, tuba and piano by the Soviet and Russian composer Galina Ustvolskaya. Written in 1970–71, it was the first of her three Compositions (1970–75), all named after phrases from the Latin Mass Ordinary and scored for different small ensembles. A performance typically lasts about 17 minutes. The work was first performed on 19 February 1975 in Leningrad by L. Suchov (piccolo), L. Klevzov (tuba), and Maria Karandashova (piano).

== Background ==
By the late 1960s Ustvolskaya had stopped working for the Soviet musical establishment. She composed alone in Leningrad and rarely allowed her music to be heard in public. Composition No. 1 was her first piece to combine two things she would keep in nearly all her later work: an ensemble of two to nine players, and a Latin religious title. The two later Compositions are Dies irae (No. 2, 1972–73) and Benedictus, qui venit (No. 3, 1974–75). Ustvolskaya wanted all three played in a church.

== Music ==
=== Instrumentation ===
The piccolo-tuba-piano combination has no precedent in the chamber repertoire. The piccolo and tuba sit at opposite ends of the orchestral range. Sikorski's catalogue note and Seth Brodsky's review for AllMusic both describe the trio as a deliberate refusal of normal chamber sound: piccolo high and loud, tuba at full fortissimo, piano writing built on dense clusters instead of triadic harmony.

=== Form ===
Dona nobis pacem has three connected movements.

- Aggressive contrapuntal variations, interrupted again and again by piano clusters.
- A slower middle section. A long tuba line runs against sustained pitches, with brief piano interjections.
- A short, quiet close in a prayer-like pianissimo.

Maria Cizmic's 2020 chapter on the piece in the Routledge volume Analytical Approaches to 20th-Century Russian Music analyses Dona nobis pacem as a study in timbre and physical vibration, not as an instrumental Mass setting. She argues that the bodily impact of the sound carries the piece's religious meaning more directly than its Latin title does.

== Reception and place in Ustvolskaya's output ==
The piece belongs to the early group of works through which Ustvolskaya became known in the West after the late 1980s, together with her Symphony No. 1 (1955) and the two later Compositions. Common features of this group include short motivic cells used in heavy repetition, sudden contrasts between extreme dynamics, and a chant-like delivery. Her contemporary Boris Tishchenko compared her style to "the concentrated light of a laser beam that is able to pierce through metal".

== Selected recordings ==
- Frank Lloyd Renggli, Roger Bobo and Patricia Schroeder, on Galina Ustvolskaya - Composition No. 1, Composition No. 2, Composition No. 3. hat[now]ART 6130 (1994).
- Reinbert de Leeuw and the Schönberg Ensemble, on Ustvolskaya: Compositions 1-3. Philips 442 532-2.
