= Hermann of Reichenau =

German Benedictine monk (1013–1054

Blessed Hermann of Reichenau a.k.a. "Hermann the Cripple" O.S.B.
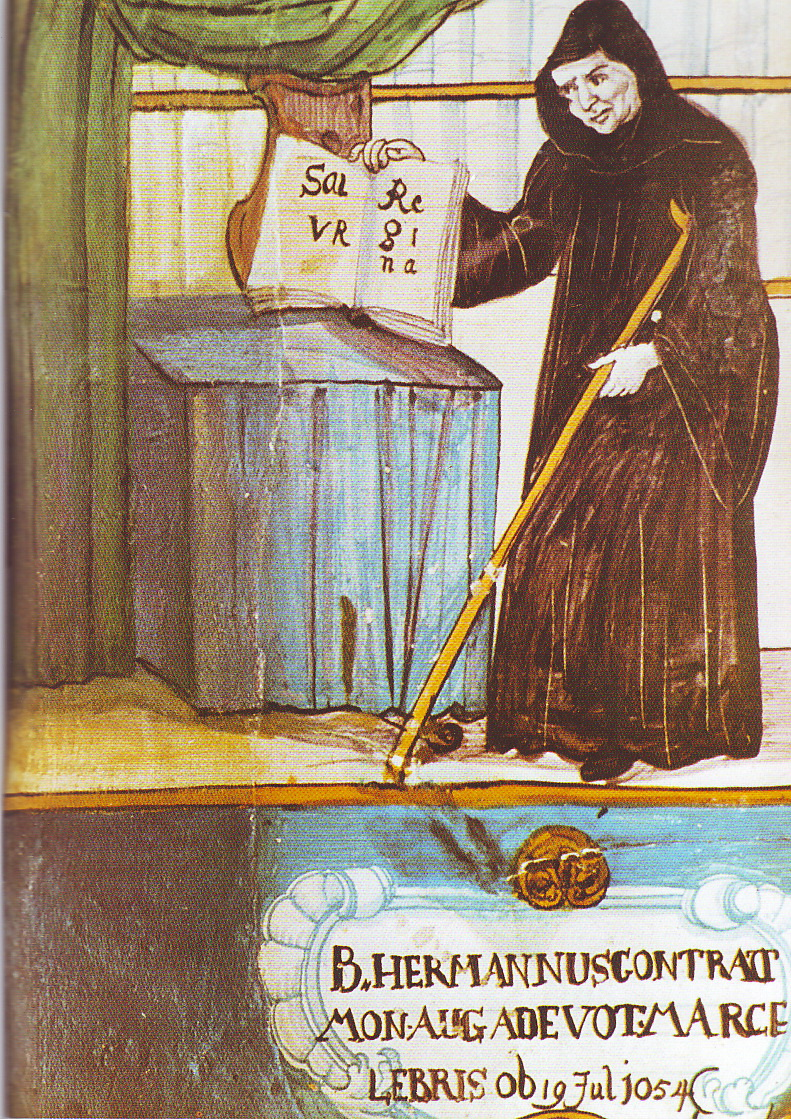

Composer of the Salve Regina
- Born: 18 July 1013; Altshausen, Duchy of Swabia, Holy Roman Empire
- Died: 24 September 1054 (aged 41); Reichenau Island, Holy Roman Empire
- Honored in: Roman Catholic Church
- Beatified: c. 1863 by Pope Pius IX
- Attributes: holding a manuscript with the words "Salve Regina"; Benedictine habit staff or crutch
- Major works: Salve Regina; Veni Sancte Spiritus; Alma Redemptoris Mater

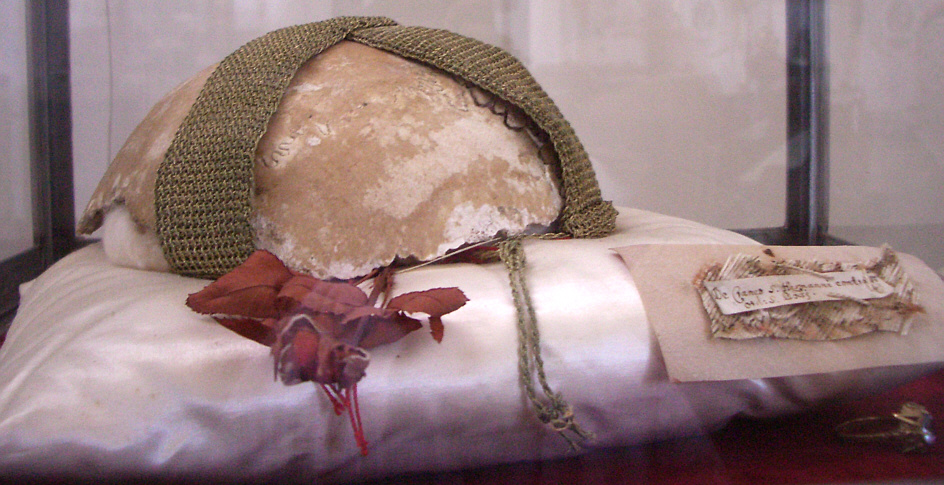
Relics of Hermann in Altshausen, Germany

Salve Regina of Herman de Reichenau sung by Les Petits Chanteurs de Passy

Blessed Hermann of Reichenau or Herman the Cripple (18 July 1013 – 24 September 1054), also known by other names, was a German Benedictine monk and scholar. He composed works on history, music theory, mathematics, and astronomy, as well as many hymns. He has traditionally been credited with the composition of "Salve Regina", "Veni Sancte Spiritus", and "Alma Redemptoris Mater", although these attributions are sometimes questioned. His cultus and beatification were confirmed by the Roman Catholic Church in 1863. His feast day is September 25.

== Names ==
Hermann's name is sometimes anglicized as Herman or Latinized as Hermannus; it sometimes also appears in the older form Heriman. He is sometimes distinguished as Hermann of Vöhringen (Latin: Hermannus de Voringen; German: Hermann von Vöhringen) from his birthplace. He is better known as Hermann of Reichenau (Latin: Hermannus Augiensis; German: Hermann von Reichenau) from the location of his monastery on Reichenau Island (Latin: Augia) in Lake Constance. He was traditionally distinguished in Latin as Hermannus Contractus (French: Hermann Contract), which appears in English as "Hermann the Lame" (German: Hermann der Lahme) or "Hermann the Cripple" (French: Hermann le Contrefait).

== Life ==
Hermann, born on 18 July 1013, was a son of the Count of Altshausen. He was born deformed. Retrospective diagnoses have included cleft palate, cerebral palsy, and spina bifida; and "either amyotrophic lateral sclerosis or spinal muscular atrophy." As a result of his disease, he had great difficulty moving and could hardly speak. At age seven, he was placed in a Benedictine monastery by his parents who could no longer look after him.

He grew up in the Abbey of Reichenau, an island on Lake Constance in Germany. He learned from the monks and developed a keen interest in both theology and the world around him. At twenty, Hermann entered their order as a Benedictine monk, becoming literate in several languages (including Arabic, Greek and Latin) and contributing to all four arts of the quadrivium.

He wrote about history, mathematics, astronomy, and Christianity. He wrote a treatise on the science of music, several works on geometry and arithmetics, and astronomical treatises including instructions for the construction of an astrolabe which caused him to sometimes be credited as its inventor. As an historian, he wrote a detailed chronicle from the birth of Christ to his own present day, ordering them after the reckoning of the Christian era. It was later extended by his pupil Berthold of Reichenau.

He was a renowned religious poet and musical composer. Among his surviving works are officia for St. Afra and St. Wolfgang. When he went blind in later life, he began writing hymns. He was famous enough that he appears to have been credited with compositions by later writers; among the works traditionally attributed to him are the Salve Regina ("Hail Queen"), Veni Sancte Spiritus ("Come Holy Spirit"), and Alma Redemptoris Mater ("Nourishing Mother of the Redeemer").

Herman died on Reichenau on 24 September 1054, aged 41. The Roman Catholic Church beatified him in 1863.

== Legacy and influence ==
Twentieth-century Russian composer Galina Ustvolskaya wrote three symphonies (namely, her second, third, and fourth) with lyrics taken from Hermann's texts.

== See also ==
- List of Roman Catholic scientist-clerics
