= Violin Sonata (Shostakovich) =

1968 sonata for violin and piano by Dmitri Shostakovich

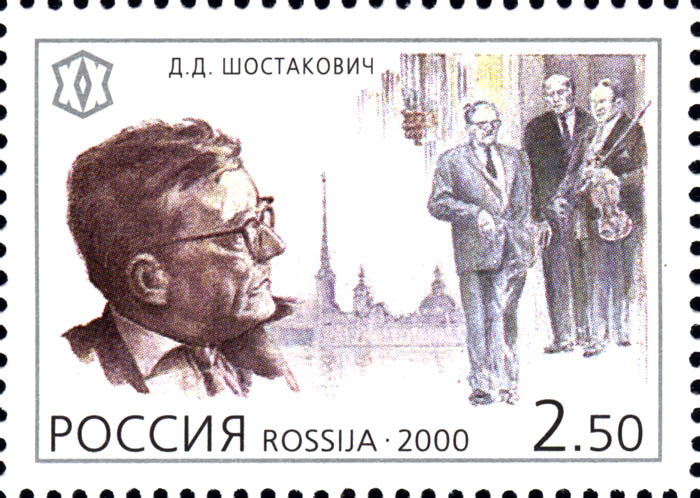
On the right of this Russian stamp is a depiction of Shostakovich together with Sviatoslav Richter and David Oistrakh after the premiere of the Violin Sonata

Dmitri Shostakovich composed his Sonata for Violin and Piano in G major, Op. 134 in the autumn of 1968 in Moscow, completing it on October 23. It is set in three movements and lasts approximately 31 minutes. It is dedicated to the violinist David Oistrakh, who premiered the work on May 3, 1969 in the Large Hall of the Moscow Conservatory.

== Oistrakh's contribution ==
According to the dedicatee, the sonata was "greeted enthusiastically everywhere", and indeed, the third movement was the Russian piece on the set list for violinists at the 1970 Tchaikovsky Competition. The autograph resides in the Glinka Museum of Musical Culture in Moscow.

Oistrakh collaborated with Shostakovich on several of the composer's major works, purportedly contributing his own insight and suggestions based on the violin's strengths and technical limitations. The work's inscription reads: "For the 60th birthday of David Oistrakh", who offered an explanation for its composition:

Dmitri had been wanting to write a new, second concerto for me as a present for my 60th birthday. However, there was an error of one year in his timing. The concerto was ready for my 59th birthday. Shortly afterwards, Dmitri seemed to think that, having made a mistake, he ought to correct it. That is how he came to write the Sonata ... I had not been expecting it, though I had long been hoping that he would write a violin sonata.

The unofficial premiere with Moishe Vainberg as pianist happened on 8 January 1969 in the Russian Union of Composers, the official premieres with Richter as pianist happened at Great Hall Moscow Conservatory on 3 May and at the Small Hall of Leningrad Philharmonic on 23 September.

Before the official public premiere in May, Oistrakh and Shostakovich recorded the work informally in the latter's apartment, though the composer's physical handicap (he was diagnosed with polio in 1965) and a relative lack of rehearsal and polish is evident in the performance. Oistrakh later recorded the sonata with Sviatoslav Richter on piano for the official release (USSR Melodiya CM-02355-6 Deep-Blue Stereo Label).

== Contents ==
Lasting approximately 30 minutes, the sonata is cast in three contrasting movements. They were originally titled "Pastorale", "Allegro Furioso", and "Variations on a Theme", respectively, but these are omitted in all published editions.

=== Movement I ===
In soft crotchet (or quarter-note) octaves, a tone-row in the piano opens the work, reminiscent of the first bars of Sergei Prokofiev's Violin Sonata No. 1 (Op. 80, 1946). Prokofiev's tempo indication is Andante assai for Op. 80, Shostakovich writes Andante for his Op. 134. Beyond a parallel austerity, Prokofiev's structural and textural influence in the movement is clear, particularly regarding the violin parts. Both composers follow darkly threatening opening material with hushed tracery that returns near the movements' respective finishes, and both end as inconclusively as they begin. Moreover, the composers share a preference for empty or open harmonies (primarily octaves) to those more tonally definite. Of particular note in the Shostakovich work is a relative freedom with meter, allowing for effective diminution and augmentation of the opening tone-row. First stated in the violin at Rehearsal 1, the movement's "theme" is given similar rhythmic treatment. The movement lasts approximately ten minutes.

=== Movement II ===
Marked Allegretto (half-note equals 100), the second movement is abrasively energetic and violent. It is in a Sonata form, with the two main themes first heard one after another (the first at rehearsal 28, the second at 31) and then restated almost contiguously until the cadence at rehearsal 34. Long development sections based on the first and then second theme follow and end at rehearsal 45, with the same cadence motive found at 34. A "fake" recapitulation follows, that is a clear restatement of the first theme, followed by another short development based on the first and them the second theme, and the first theme again. This leads to the real recapitulation at rehearsal 53, which is followed by a coda.

The movement harshness comes from a complete indulgence in rhythmic, tonal, and dynamic angularity. Tempo remains constant throughout its six-minute duration, however, so various rhythms diversify and give structure to the movement, characterized overall by a gritty relentlessness. The opening motif, stated in the violin, provides the rhythmic and thematic germ for the movement. Instead of actually adjusting tempo or dynamics, Shostakovich often prefers growing perceived accelerandos and crescendos out of thickening textures and shorter note values, which, particularly at Rehearsal 32, 47, and 51 give the movement the effect of frenzy or perhaps desperation. A grim tone-row (beginning 4 after Rehearsal 56) repeated in shorter and shorter note values during the recapitulation signals a departure from previous material, which is followed by a sarcastic herald call and the movement's abrupt end.

=== Movement III ===
Originally marked Variations on a Theme, the third movement is a passacaglia with a short introduction. The introduction is heard at the beginning of the movement (rehearsal 58), and the passacaglia starts immediately after, at rehearsal 59, when we hear what will become the bass theme played by the violin in pizzicato. The passacaglia is occasionally interrupted or prolonged but otherwise it never stops repeating until the final, cadenza like, statement by violin solo is reached (rehearsal 75). At the end of the violin solo both instruments rejoin with a restatement of the introduction material by the piano. Starting at rehearsal 77 the material from the second theme of the first movement reappears, and we move toward a clear restatement of the ending of that movement at rehearsal 80, followed by a brief final codetta that includes the ponticello motive that was played multiple times by the violin in the first movement.
