= Yuri Falik =

Russian composer (1936–2009)

Yuri Falik Юрий Фалик People's Artist of Russia

Background information
- Born: 30 July 1936; Odessa
- Died: 23 January 2009 (aged 72) Saint-Petersburg
- Occupations: Cellist, composer, conductor, pedagogue
- Instrument: Violoncello

Yuri (Yury) Alexandrovich Falik (Russian: Юрий Александрович Фалик; July 30, 1936, Odessa, USSR – January 23. 2009, Saint-Petersburg, Russia) was a Russian composer, orchestral conductor, cellist, a board member of the Leningrad (Saint-Petersburg) branch of the Composers' Union, and People's Artist of Russia.

== Biography ==
=== Childhood and youth ===
Yuri Falik was born into a family of orchestral musicians. His father Alexander Efimovich Falik played percussion in the Odessa Opera's orchestra and his mother Yevgenia Mikhailovna worked at the Odesa Opera and Ballet Theatre. During his early childhood, Falik was often present at orchestra rehearsals and opera productions, easily memorising and humming the music he heard. He and his mother were evacuated to Kyrgyzstan during World War II, while his father volunteered on the front lines of the war until he was killed in 1942. The family tragedy and traumatic experiences of his early childhood strongly influenced not only Falik's personality but also his art. After returning to Odessa in 1944, he started his cello studies under the guidance of David Abramovich Mevzhinsky, his late father's friend from the Odessa Opera House symphony orchestra.

The following year, Falik entered his class at the famous Odessa Secondary Special Music Boarding School, beginning his systematic music education. At the age of 11, Falik began composing, often neglecting his schoolwork in favor of his new hobby. Soon he got his first mentor in composition, the composer Vladimir Afanasievich Shvets, who taught musical literature at the P. Stolyarsky School.

Throughout his life, Falik had a special interest in quartets. In addition, as a cellist, he played in the school's academic quartet ensemble. In 1952, he organised his own quartet ensemble, which consisted of his schoolmates and friends. Along with classical works, the repertoire of this quartet included new works of the Soviet Union composers, as well as Falik's original compositions. According to his friend Adam Stratievsky, there were two youth quartets (1953 and 1954) written for the ensemble. The Quartet in e-moll (1954) was subsequently published by the Soviet Composer Publishing House in 1982 and was included in the list of the composer's works as the First Quartet. By the time he left school, Falik had composed a number of works in a variety of genres, including chamber, orchestral, choral and solo works. However, he decided to enter the performing faculty of the Leningrad Conservatory as a cellist.

=== Conservatory ===
Between 1955 and 1960, Falik studied cello at the Leningrad Conservatory in Professor Alexander Shtrimmer's class. He then pursued his postgraduate studies under Mstislav Rostropovich's guidance. He successfully started his performing career with his first solo concert in Leningrad in 1958, where he performed concert tours in cities around the USSR. In 1962, Falik became a diploma-winner of the Second International Tchaikovsky Competition, and a few months later he won the first prize in the International Cello Competition at the Eighth World Festival of Youth and Students in Helsinki.

Though he had a very busy life as a cellist, Falik never lost his desire to compose music, and in 1959 he was accepted to the composition class of the conservatory first under Yuri Balkashin's guidance, and later under Boris Arapov's. He graduated from the conservatory as a composer in 1964, submitting the Symphony for String Orchestra and Percussion and the Quintet for Winds as his diploma works.

In 1962 Falik met Igor Stravinsky while he was touring in the USSR. Stravinsky discouraged his venture both as a cellist and composer. As a result, Falik devoted more and more time to composition, although he never fully abandoned playing the cello. In 1975, Falik expressed his piety for the Stravinsky ins his composition Mourning Mass for Igor Stravinsky ("Elegiac Music") for four trombones and sixteen strings, composed for the five-year anniversary of Stravinsky's death.

== Career ==
Falik's career as a composer started with his Second String Quartet (1965) dedicated to Yuri Balkashin's memory. The Quartet was performed with great success by the Leningrad Taneyev Quartet in 1966, and was recommended for publication by the Leningrad Composers' Union. Considering this work a milestone, he arranged it for string orchestra under the title Music for Strings (1968).

Perhaps due to Stravinsky's influences, the next few years of Falik's career were devoted to the ballet genre. Between 1966 and 1968, he composed three ballets in collaboration with choreographer librettist Georgy Aleksidze: Buffoons, Thiel Ulenspiegel and Oresteia. Only two of three ballets of the 1960s were staged. Buffoons was produced on the stage of the Leningrad Academic Cappella in 1967. Oresteia was staged during two seasons in Leningrad Kirov Opera and Ballet Theatre, then in Tbilisi (1973) and Estonia (1979). At Leningrad premiere production in 1969 Falik made his official debut as a conductor. While Thiel Ulenspiegel was never staged, Falik repurposed some of its musical material in his First Concerto for Symphony Orchestra. The premiere of the Concert conducted by Dmitry Kitayenko took place in 1971, in Moscow. Similarly, he reused material from his planned fourth ballet Capriccios in his Second Concerto for the orchestra Symphonic Etudes (1977), dedicated to G. Rozhdenstvensky.

The 1970s were very fruitful for Falik's compositional development. At this time, he became renowned as a chamber-instrumental and an orchestral composer. Since 1966, Falik was a regular participant of the Leningrad Musical Spring Festival. In 1972, his First Concerto for symphony orchestra was performed at the Third International Festival "Prague Spring" by a Czechoslovak radio orchestra under conductor Eduard Serov.

At the end of the 1960s Falik discovered a new field of work – music for choir. From 1969 onwards, he composed choral cycles and independent compositions for choir every year. His works of the 1970-80s brought him wide fame as a choral composer. His usage of choir is unusual, as it quite often implements orchestral colours. Much of his choral music makes usage of religious themes, such as the mass or the Gregorian chant.

The Violin Concerto (1971) marked the beginning of his period of creative maturity. Its five movements consist of open parts following each other without interruption and provides the effect of continuous development of the principal intonation idea. Melodic material of the concerto grows out of several simple tunes which are presented in the introduction and pass evolving and varying through the whole cycle. The concerto was dedicated to his friend Victor Lieberman and performed by him in Leningrad under the conductor Alexander Dmitriev with great success. In 1973, Falik received a positive review on the Violin Concerto from Dmitry Shostakovich, whom he admired.

=== "Polly" in America ===
At the end of the 1980s the American producer Geraldine Freund set out to revive the genre of the symphonic musical fairy tale. Because the genre's most performed piece was Sergei Prokofiev's Peter and the Wolf she believed that only a Soviet composer should continue this tradition. On the advice of Vladimir Ovcharek, head of the Leningrad Taneyev Quartet, she addressed the proposal to Falik. "I was told that Falik is the only soviet composer who still writes melodies", Freund recalled. Falik accepted and soon, by August of 1989 full score of the musical fairy tale "Polly and Dinosaurs" for two narrators, children choir and symphony orchestra was composed. In the following year Falik was invited to America to conduct the Chicago Symphony Orchestra at the world premiere of his piece.

=== Teaching ===
In 1980, Falik became a senior lecturer at the Leningrad Conservatory. From 1988, he worked there as a professor of composition and instrumentation. According to him, his task as an educator was not to push the talent, but to guide it in the right direction by keeping a talented person "wrapped in cotton wool" from the beginning. He particularly focused on the issue of influence and imitation: in his opinion, a young composer should not be afraid of someone else's influence: "If your own nature is strong, it will gain strength and make its voice heard". However, it is necessary to be careful in choosing the object of imitation, to distinguish the "open" (general composition techniques) and "closed" (emulation of a specific composer) types of composing style systems. He believed the influence of an "open style system" posed no danger for beginners, while it is better to avoid the imitation of a specific composers as in the "closed style systems".

=== Conducting ===
Falik's first time conducting was as a student, when he had to record music for Lope de Vega's play A Peasant Woman from Getafe for the Leningrad Film Studio. A few years later he was entrusted with artistic direction of the Leningrad Conservatory's Student Chamber orchestra. Additionally, he performed as a conductor all over Russia and abroad. During his tour in the United States during 1990s, his performances conducting the Chicago and Baltimore Symphony orchestras were highly praised by the press. His programs always included music of the twentieth century, as well as the music of little-known and Russian composers.

== Music and style ==
The influences which formed Falik's musical language include those of his contemporaries, such as Stravinsky, Paul Hindemith and Shostakovich. He wasn't a strict follower of any compositional technique, and as such his compositions exhibit moments of expanded tonality with dodecaphonic elements. The intonation origins of his music are often rooted in the ancient layers of folk and professional music of the Russian, European and Jewish traditions. Additionally he made usage of archaic intonation in his most significant compositions.

"A super master of every aspect of technique, he treats new methods selectively – only using them as his artistic concepts require. First, he searches for hidden resources in traditional genres and forms but foremost is the emergence of the idea, the conviction of the decision, the grasp of the intricacy of his musical development and the beauty of the sound"

Ekaterina Ruch'evskaya

== Works ==
Works for stage

- The Oresteia (1968)
- Plutni Skapena (1982)

Orchestral works

- Concertino for oboe and chamber orchestra (1961)
- First Symphony for string orchestra and percussion (1963)
- First Concerto for Orchestra (1967)
- Music for Strings for string orchestra (1968)
- Light Symphony for orchestra (1971)
- Violin Concerto for violin and orchestra (1971)
- Morning Mass for Igor Stravinsky ("Elegiac Music") for four trombones and sixteen strings (1975)
- Second Concerto for Orchestra ("Symphonic Etudes") (1977)
- Chamber Concerto for three flutes (by one performer) and string orchestra (1983)
- Symphoniette for string orchestra (1984)
- Concertino for bassoon and string orchestra (1987)
- Concerto della Passione for cello and symphony orchestra (1988)
- Vivat for symphony orchestra (1991)
- Symphony No. 2 "Kaddish" (1993)
- Lyric Concertino for viola and small symphony orchestra (1973, rev. 2002）
- Symphony No. 3 "Canto In Memoria" (2005)

Chamber instrumental works

- Eight String Quartets (1954, 1965, 1974, 1976, 1978, 1984, 1993, 2001)
- Trio for oboe, cello and piano (1959)
- Quintet for winds (1964)
- Buffoons Concerto for winds and percussion (1966)
- Partita for organ (1966)
- Invention for vibrophone, marimba and five tom-toms (1972)
- Composition for violin (1975)
- Toccata for horn and piano (1975)
- English Divertissement for flute, clarinet and bassoon (1978)
- Composition for cello solo (1979)
- Pastoral and Burlesque for flute and piano (1980)
- Three Pieces for clarinet solo (1983)
- Introduction and Three Canzones for flute, bassoon, violin, cello and piano (from Plutni Skapena) (1995)
- Retro-music for brass quintet (2003)

Piano works

- Nadia's Tales (1969)
- Children's Piano Album (1974)
- Five Preludes (1982)
- Dedicated to Paganini (1981)

Vocal works

- A Solemn Song for soloist, choir and orchestra (1968)
- Praying Voice for soprano and chamber orchestra (1978)
- Ringaday ("Zveniden'") for mezzo-soprano and orchestra (1986)
- Polly and Dinosaurs for two narrators, children choir and symphony orchestra (1989)
- Mass for soloists, choir and chamber orchestra (1996)
- Mannerheim for mixed choir, clarinet, piano and percussion (2007)
- World Songs for baritone and piano (1961)
- A Half-Fairy Tale ("Poluskazki"), for baritone and piano (1965)
- The Sad Mother for mezzo-soprano and piano (1972)
- Five poems by Anna Akhmatova for soprano and piano (1972)
- Ringaday ("Zveniden") for mezzo-soprano and orchestra (1980)
- Beranger Songs for baritone and piano (1984)
- …From Lyrical Diary for tenor and piano (1985)
- Two songs for soprano and piano (1995)

Choir a cappella

- Triptich (1969)
- Autumn Sons (1970)
- Two solfeggio (1973),
- Cant-Vivat for men's choir (1974)
- A Stranger Lady ("Neznakomka") (1974)
- A Harp (1974)
- Winter Sons (1975)
- Estonian Watercolours for women's choir (1976)
- Poems by Igor Severianin (1979)
- The City Sleeps (1980)
- Karelian Watercolor (1980)
- Prayer (1983)
- Doloroso (1983)
- Ivan's Willow (1984)
- Colorful Images for children's (or women's) choir (1985)
- Trinity ("Troicyn den") (1987)
- O, Nature! (1988),
- Liturgical Chants ("Liturgicheskie pesnopeniya") (1990–1993)
- Prayers (1997)
- Stanzas by Pushkin (1998)
- Ellegies for soprano solo and choir (2001)
- Four Сhoirs for choir and flute (2003)
- Miraculous Faces ("Pred Svyatye Ikony") for mixed choir (2004)
- Four Russian Songs for Women's Choir (2005)
- Two Prayers ("Dva molitvosloviya") for women's choir (2007)
- Book of Canzons (2007, 2008)
- Prayer (2009)

Stage and Film

- Pushkin's Tales (1962)
- A Peasant Woman from Getafe (1962)
- Theme with Variations (1972)
- The Near World, the Far World (1974)
- Five Years of Life (1976)

== Awards ==
- Honored Artists of the Russian Federation (1981)
- Golden [Medal of Pushkin] (1999)
- People's Artist of Russia (2002)

== Bibliography ==
- Mikhail Galushko (1986) Obrashchayas' k Mol'yeru [Turning to Molière] // Sovetskaya Musika – Soviet Music, no. 4, pp. 36–40 (in Russian)
- Anna Gorn (2020) Balety Yu. Falika: zhanrovye vzaimodejstviya i muzykal'no-dramaticheskie idei [Yu. Falik's Ballets: Genre Interaction and Musical-dramatic Ideas] //Vestnik Akademii russkogo baleta - Bulletin of the Vaganova Ballet Academy's, no. 3, pp. 85–98.
- Arkady Klimovitsky (ed.) (1994) Yuri Falik. Shtrihi k tvorcheskomu portretu [Yuri Falik. Touches to the Creative Portrait]. In: Kompository Rossijskoj Federacii - Composers of Russian Federation, Issue 5. Moscow: Kompozitor Publ., pp. 279 – 317 (in Russian)
- Arkady Klimovitsky Falik, Yuri Aleksandrovich//Grove Dictionary Online. Available from: https://doi.org/10.1093/gmo/9781561592630.article.09261
- Andrey Kovalyov (2017) "Liturgicheskie Pesnopeniya" Yuriya Falika: problema tsiklichnosti [Yuri Falik's "Liturgical Chant": Cyclicality Issue] //Observatoria kulturi / Observatory of Culture, 14, no. 4. Available from: [https://elibrary.ru/item.asp?id=30013959] [Accessed 15.07.20] (in Russian)
- Metamorphozi. Yuri Falik: violonchelist, kompozitor, dirizher, pedagog. Dialogi s kompozitorom [Metamorphoses. Yuri Falik: Cellist, Composer, Conductor, Teacher. Dialogues with the Composer] (2010). St. Petersburg: Kompozitor-Sankt-Peterburg Publ., 366 p. (in Russian)
- Iosif Raiskin (2009). Chistaya nota [Pure Tone] // Musikalnaya Akademiya – Music Academy, no. 4, pp. 108–110. Available from: https://www.elibrary.ru/item.asp?id=13031596 [Accessed 30.07.20] (in Russian)
- Ekaterina Ruch'evskaya (1981) Yuri Falik. Leningrad: Sovetsky Kompozitor Publ., 104 p. (in Russian)
- Ekaterina Ruch'evskaya (1995). Yuri Falik. St. Petersburg: Soyuz Kompozitorov Publ. [in Russin / in English]
- Ekaterina Ruch'evskaya (2011) Simphonicheskoe tvorchestvo Yuriya Falika [Yu. Falik's Symphonic Works]. In: Ruchievskaya E. A. Works of Different Years: V. 1. Articles, notes, memories. St. Petersburg. Kompozitor-St. Peterburg Publ., pp. 211–270. (in Russian)
- Sergey Sigitov (1996) Beseda s Yuriem Falikom [Conversation with Yuri Falik] //Mariinskij teatr – Mariinskii Opera House, no. 5–6, p. 6 (in Russian)
- Adam Stratievsky (ed.) (1973) Kompozitor Yuri Falik: shtrikhi tvorcheskogo portreta [Falik: features of the creative portrait]. Muzïka i zhizn' - Music and Life, Issue 3. Leningrad - Moscow. pp. 20–39 (in Russian)
- Adam Stratievsky (ed.) (2016) O kvartetah Yuria Falika [About Quartets of Yuri Falik]. In: Adam Solomonovich Stratievsky: Kniga pamyati - Adam Solomonovich Stratievsky: Memory Book (ed.) (2016). St. Petersburg: Art- Express Publ., pp. 270–348. Available from: [Accessed 19.07.20] (in Russian)
- Olga Tarasova (2009) Horovoe tvorchestvo Yuriya Falika. Diss. kand. iskusstvovedeniya [Yuri Falik's Choral Works. Extended Abstract of Ph.D. Thesis of Art Criticism]. Nizhnij Novgorod: N. Novgorod State Conservatory, 25 p. Available from: [Accessed 15.07.20] (in Russian)
- Yu. Falik: "Nuzhno vernut' russkij fol'klor v pravoslavnuyu muzyku" [Yuri Falik: "It is necessary to return Russian folklore to Orthodox music"] (ed.) (2012). In: Muzykal'nyj mir v novom tysyacheletii: vzglyad iz Peterburga [The Musical World in the New Millennium: a View from St. Petersburg], part 1. Interv'yu s kompozitorami/ ed. by Andrey Epishin. St. Petersburg: Kompozitor-Sankt-Petersburg Publ., pp. 94–102 (in Russian)
- John von Rhein (1990) Staging a Pet Project //Chicago Tribune, March 4. Available from: [Accessed 15/07/20] John von Rhein (1990) Available from: Fantasy comes to Life in `Polly and the Dinosaurs`// Chicago Tribune, March 5. [Accessed 15.07.20].
