= Roberta Pili =

Roberta Pili was born in Cagliari, Sardinia as the first child of a musical family. Her father gave her first piano lesson at age five. At age eight, she was awarded first prize at national youth piano competitions in Italy.

She continued her musical education at the Conservatorio G.P. da Palestrina at her hometown and completed her studies with the highest degree and honours.

Masterclasses at the renowned Accademia Musicale Chigiana in Siena led her to further piano studies at the University of Music and Performing Arts, Vienna.

She was influenced by the Welsch composer and pianist Dafydd Llywelyn in Munich. He was her most important mentoring figure regarding her musical and pianistic development. He introduced her to the piano tradition of polyphonic playing of the old masters, for example, Shura Cherkassky.

2009 she performed at Carnegie Hall the last five piano sonatas by Beethoven in a single concert evening. This event was realized in cooperation with The Breast Cancer Research Foundation founded by Evelyn Lauder.

In 2011 she performed the same concert programme in Tokyo at Sogakudo Concert Hall, starting a Japan concert tour.

Also, in 2011 she gave a guest performance at Lisztfestival Raiding presenting a high philosophical and dramaturgic concert programme titled Totentanz.

In the same year she was also invited for a guest performance with the Concerto en Ré by J.S. Bach at Vienna State Opera for the premiere of the ballet school of the venue.

She is the founder and president of The Charles-Valentin Alkan Society of Vienna – Institute for polyphonic piano playing and sound aesthetics.

Roberta Pili lives in Vienna.

== Awards ==
- International Piano Competition "Alessandro Casagrande" Terni: 2nd prize (1st prize not awarded) and the special award "M.Ravel" (1988)
- Elena-Rombro-Stepanow Piano Competition of the Musikhochschule Wien: 1st prize (1988)
- L.Bösendorfer Piano Competition in Vienna: 1st prize (1991)
- International Mozart Competition Salzburg: 2nd prize (1995)
- Premio Navicella Sardegna in Castelsardo: The most renowned award for outstanding personalities from Sardinia who have distinguished themselves at international level (2010).

== Discography ==
- Album Mirrors released on her own record label RPPR Roberta Pili Piano Records® - (2008)
