= Sabine Liebner =

Munich-based pianist

Sabine Liebner is a Munich-based pianist, specializing in a modern and contemporary repertoire. She has recorded and performed works by Pauline Oliveros, Galina Ustvolskaya, Earle Brown, Giacinto Scelsi, John Cage, Morton Feldman, and others. She was two-time winner of the Munich Music Prize.
