= Alexander Fridlender =

Soviet composer, pianist, and conductor

Alexander Grigoryevitch Fridlender (Russian: Александр Григорьевич Фридлендер; 2/15 July 1906 – 13 September 1980) was a Soviet composer, pianist and conductor, as well as professor at the Urals Mussorgsky State Conservatoire.

== Life ==
Fridlender was born in Saint Petersburg. He studied at the Leningrad Central Music College (1925–1929) and graduated from the Leningrad Conservatory in 1933.

He then worked as the conductor of the Voronezh Radio Symphony Orchestra (1934–1935) and the Odessa Opera and Ballet Theater (1936). Afterwards he moved to Sverdlovsk and spent the rest of his life there.

Fridlender conducted Sverdlovsk State Symphony Orchestra (1939–1941, 1947–1974) and the State Academic Theatre of Opera and Ballet (1943–1947).

He taught at the Urals Mussorgsky State Conservatoire.

He composed several operas, instrumental music such as suites, music for plays, songs.

== Selected compositions ==
- 1941: The Mountain Fairy Tale (Russian: Горная сказка, romanized: Gornaja skazka), a ballet based on "The Mistress of the Copper Mountain".
- 1944: The Stone Flower, a ballet based on the story of the same name.
- 1958: Without a Dowry (Russian: Бесприданница, romanized: Bespridannitsa), a ballet based on the play of the same name.
- 1962: Snow (Russian: Снег, romanized: Sneg), a ballet
- 1966: Zoya (Russian: Зоя), a choreographic poem
- 1967: Petersburgers (Russian: Питерцы, romanized: Pitertsy), an opera based on the poem by Olga Bergholz.
- 1970: The Cake in the Sky (Russian: Торт в небе, romanized: Tort v nebe), a comedy opera based on the story by Gianni Rodari La torta in cielo.
- 1977: Lieutenant Lermontov (Russian: Поручик Лермонтов, romanized: Poruchik Lermontov), a choreographic poem
