= Aleksandr Dmitriyev =

Russian conductor (born 1935)

Aleksandr Sergeyevich Dmitriyev (Russian: Алекса́ндр Серге́евич Дми́триев; born 19 January 1935), PAU, is a Russian conductor of orchestral and choral music and opera. He has been director of the Symphony Orchestra of the Karel Autonomous Republic, and Principal Conductor of the Maly Academic Opera House in Leningrad. Since 1977 he has been Chief Conductor and Artistic director of the Academic Symphony Orchestra of the Saint Petersburg Philharmonia.

== Students ==
Among Dmitriyev's students are Andrey Anikhanov (Honored Artists of the Russian Federation), Vladimir Altshuler and Arkady Steinlucht.

== Awards and honours ==
- Honoured Worker of the Arts Industry of the RSFSR (1970)
- People's Artist of the RSFSR (1976)
- People's Artist of the USSR (1990)
- State Prize of the Russian Federation (2000)
- Order of Honour (2005)
- Order "For Merit to the Fatherland", 4th class (2010)
- Laureate of the State Prize of the Russian Federation in the field of literature and art (2010)
