= Vladimir Altschuler =

Vladimir Altschuler Владимир Абрамович Альтшулер
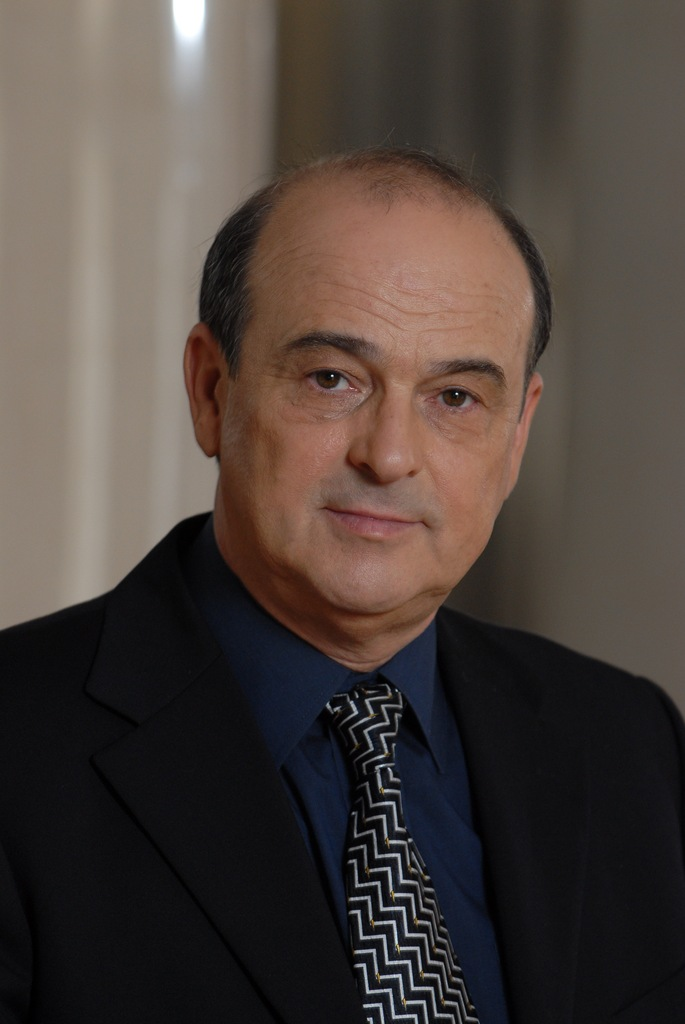
- Russian chief-conductor and artistic director

Background information
- Born: Vladimir Abramovich Altshuler; 29 September 1946 (age 79); Moscow, Soviet Union
- Genres: Classical
- Occupation: Conductor

Vladimir Abramovich Altschuler, also Altshuler (Russian: Владимир Абрамович Альтшулер; born 29 September 1946), is a Russian chief-conductor and artistic director of Saint Petersburg Academic Symphony Orchestra and Honoured Artist of Russia.

== Education and first appearance ==
Altschuler obtained a Ph.D. in art history but decided to become a musician instead. He joined one of Saint Petersburg's orchestras in 1969. In 1970 he graduated from the Leningrad Conservatory under the tutelage of Yuri Kramarov, who taught him viola. Twelve years later he became a conductor at his graduation school under guidance from Aleksandr Dmitriyev and then became chief conductor of the Academic Symphony Orchestra two years later. His debut as a conductor was in the same year at the same place and in 1990 he became a director of the Chamber Orchestra of the Academic Troupe, a position he retains as of 2013.

== Conductor ==
=== National performances ===
In 1994 he became a conductor of the Academic Symphony Orchestra where he performed musical scores from Bach to Shostakovich which pieces have appeared in many Russian films. He also performed various polka and waltz music at such festivals as the Sound Ways Festival and Great Waltz and featuring music by Krzysztof Penderecki and Witold Lutosławski. For the very first time of Russian music history, Altschuler have performed Anton Bruckner's nine symphonies and later on performed Michael Tippett's A Child of Our Time which was performed for the first time in Saint Petersburg. He also performed various works by Veniamin Basner, Galina Ustvolskaya and many other national and international composers.

From 2011 to 2012 he performed Sergei Slonimsky's Symphony No. 13 and later on produced works by French, German and Austrian Romantic era composers such as Camille Saint-Saëns, Mahler, Mendelssohn, Schumann, Richard Strauss. He also composed music by the Russian composers and composers from other eras including Alexander Scriabin, Rimsky-Korsakov, Tchaikovsky, Mussorgsky and Charles Gounod, among others.

=== International performances ===
With those performances he traveled to Finland, Germany, Great Britain, Ireland, Norway, Portugal, Spain, Switzerland, both Croatia and North Macedonia and even Asian countries such as South Korea and Turkey. From 2013 to 2014 he played Slonimsky's Symphony No. 28 and also did Hector Berlioz's Romeo and Juliet following by Edvard Grieg's Cello Sonata. During the same years he performed musical scores of Russian composers such as Rachmaninoff and Tchaikovsky, as well German and French ones such as Ludwig van Beethoven, Mozart, Brahms, Claude Debussy and Frédéric Chopin. Currently he is rehearsing with Alexander Rudin with whom he will perform Saint Petersburg’s Musical Spring on the 50th International Festival.

== Awards ==
- Order of Friendship (May 22, 2014) — for achievements in labour, significant contribution to the socio-economic development of the Russian Federation, the implementation of the foreign policy course of the Russian Federation, achievements in the humanitarian field, many years of conscientious work, active social activities
- Merited Artist of the Russian Federation (August 2, 1997) — for services in the field of art
