= Dafydd Llywelyn (composer) =

Welsh composer, pianist, conductor and teacher (1939-2013)

- Born: 10 January 1939; South Wales
- Died: 25 March 2013 (aged 74); Munich, Germany
- Occupations: Composer; Pianist; Conductor; Teacher

Dafydd Llywelyn (10 January 1939, in South Wales – 25 March 2013, in Munich) was a Welsh composer, pianist, conductor and teacher.

== Biography ==
Llywelyn, born in South Wales, received his first piano lessons from his father and later from priests in a monastic boarding school in the Midlands. His other teachers include the British pianist Tom Bromley, Johann Trygvasson (father-in-law of Vladimir Ashkenazy) and Peter Feuchtwanger (nephew of the writer Lion Feuchtwanger). He received an important musical influence from the pianist and later close friend Shura Cherkassky, who showed him the tradition of the old masters' polyphonic piano playing. He was later significantly inspired by Pierre Boulez, Karlheinz Stockhausen and Kirill Kondraschin. In Birmingham and then London he studied music, medicine, criminology and theology, after which he moved to Cologne. He moved to Munich in 1971, and in 1984 until his death lived with his life-partner Hedy Schmitt in the Haidhausen district.

When he was three years old, his mother died from leukemia. Later he began to translate and write his thoughts into music. The deep religiosity of his work, which he was already composing in a meditative state since his youth, was in large part inspired by the early loss of his mother. He wrote his first significant composition Dies Irae at the age of 12. He also frequented the stage as a performing pianist; in 1966 he was a participant of the German premier of Erik Satie's Vexations. His interests in composition were wide, and at the end of the 1960s he took on the band The Lonely Ones (later The Joint) as performers of his film music; along the way, he taught their keyboardist Rick Davies, who shortly after founded the band Supertramp.

Llywelyn's catalog includes compositions for solo instrument, as well as film music, rock and jazz. As a pianist and conductor he performed in Europe, the United States, and Canada. As a teacher, from 1971, he was instrumental in promoting young talent at the piano. The pianist Roberta Pili is considered to be his direct musical and pianistic successor, as she is an enthusiastic mentor for the young pianists' generation by teaching the polyphonic piano playing, remembering her teacher. In 1993 he took on the position of guest professor of composition, piano and musical analysis at the University of Belgrade.

Llywelyn is known for his music, characterized by hyper-polyphony and a meditative quality of timelessness. His works are played around the world by such pianists as Boris Berezovsky, Nathan Carterette, and Severin von Eckardstein,.

== Literature ==
- Rafael Sala: Dafydd Llywelyn: Der Magier der leisen Töne. In: Pianonews. Nr. 3, Mai/Juni 2008, S. 54–56.(PDF; 14,24 MB)
- Gregor Arnsberg: Ein religiöser Mystiker
