= Violin Sonata No. 2 (Fauré) =

Violin sonata by Gabriel Fauré

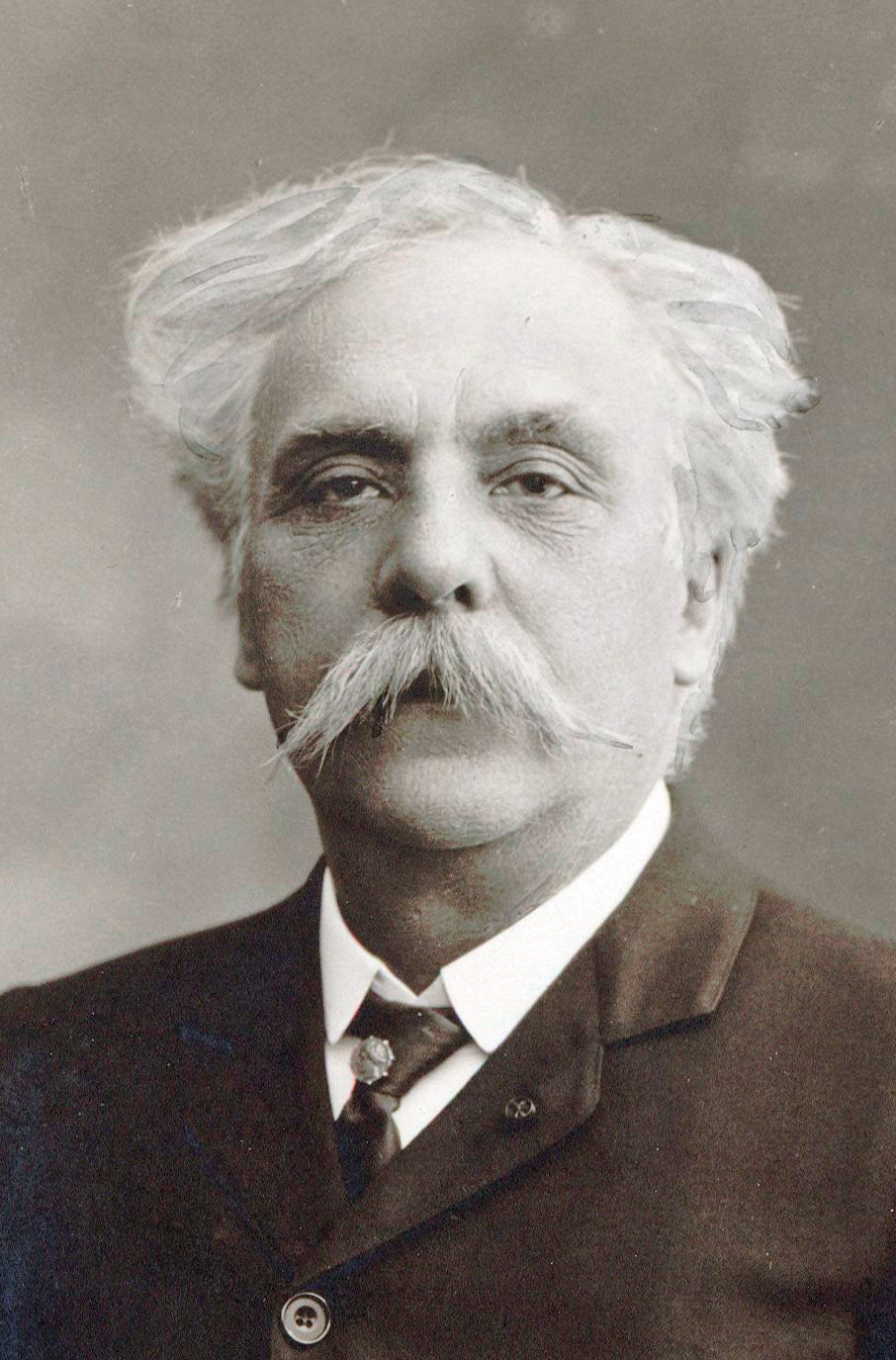
Fauré in 1905

The Violin Sonata No. 2 in E minor, Op. 108, was written by Gabriel Fauré in 1916, more than 40 years after the first violin sonata. It was premiered on 10 November 1917 at a concert of the Société Nationale de Musique with Louis Capet on the violin and the composer himself playing the piano. At the same concert, the Cello Sonata No. 1 was also premiered. It was dedicated to Queen Elisabeth of Belgium, who was a violinist, and had shown sympathy towards Fauré's works.

== Structure ==
The work consists of three movements. A performance takes approximately 22 minutes.

1. Allegro non troppo
2. Andante
3. Finale: Allegro non troppo
