= Ural Philharmonic Orchestra =

Russian orchestra

- Symphony Orchestra
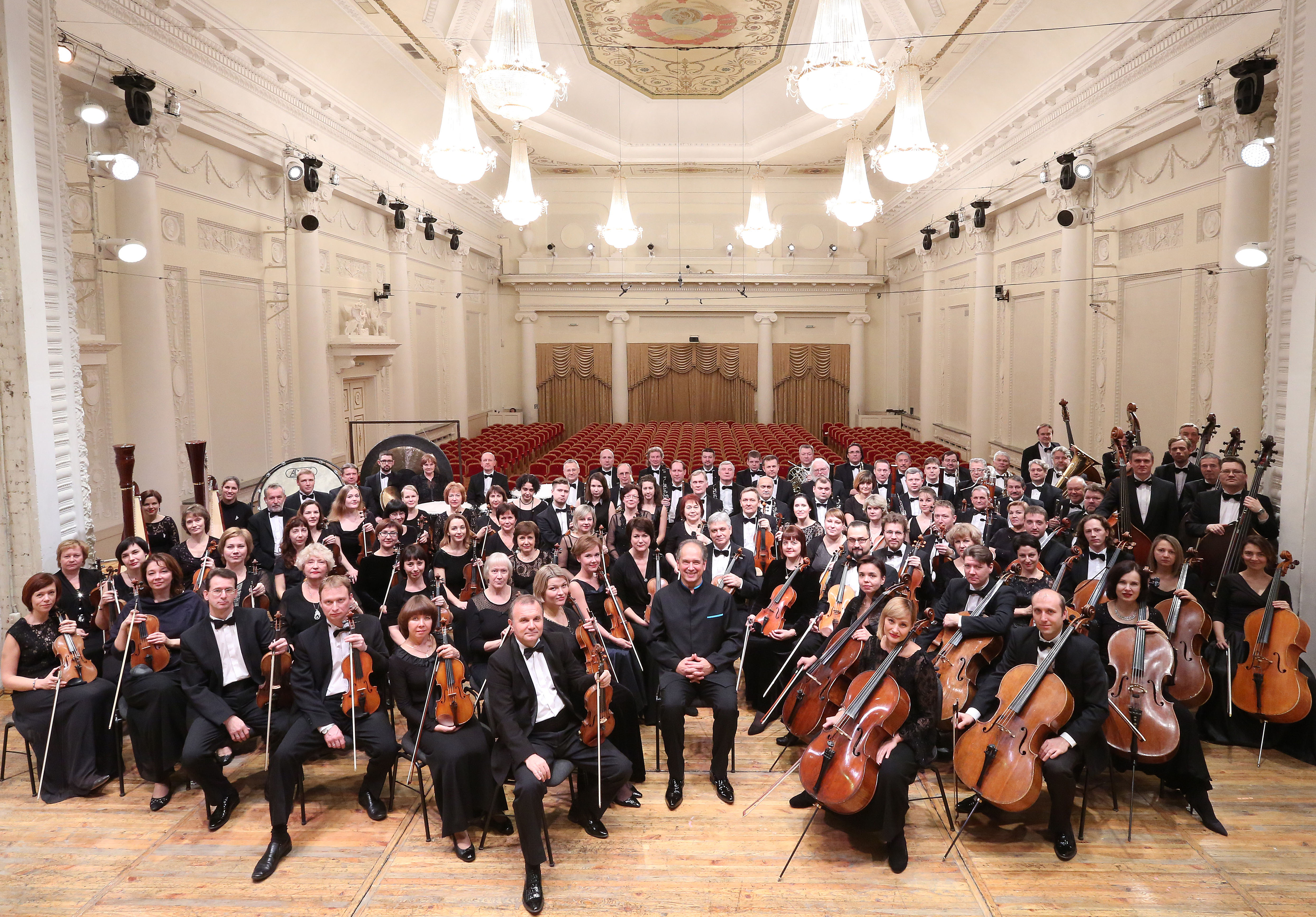
- Former name: Joint Orchestra of Philharmonic and Radio Committee (until 1941); Symphony Orchestra of Sverdlovsk Philharmonic (until 1949); Sverdlovsk State Symphony Orchestra (until 1990), Ural State Philharmonic Orchestra (until 1991)
- Founded: 1936, 87 years ago
- Location: Yekaterinburg, Russia
- Concert hall: Sverdlovsk Philharmonic
- Principal conductor: Dmitry Liss
- Music director: Dmitry Liss
- Website: https://en.sgaf.ru/musicians/8497

Ural Philharmonic Orchestra (Russian: Уральский Aкадемический Филармонический Oркестр) or UPO is one of the most recognized Russian orchestras with 87 years of history. The collective of 101 musicians is based in Sverdlovsk Philharmonic,Yekaterinburg along with the Yekaterinburg Philharmonic Choir and the Ural Youth Symphony Orchestra. UPO was founded in 1936 by Konstantin Saradzhev's student, Mark Paverman on the basis of the Orchestra of the Sverdlovsk Radio Committee. It is the winner of the national Music Critics Association Prize (2020), and the 440Hz Big Orchestral Award (2022).

== Overview ==
Ural Philharmonic Orchestra performs over 100 concerts and more than 70 programs per year, its concerts are regularly broadcast via the Sverdlovsk Philharmonic's digital concert hall. Led by their Artistic Director and Chief Conductor Dmitry Liss for over 25 years, the orchestra is famous for its particular sound and performance excellence, both of classical and contemporary repertoires. UPO is the main resident orchestra of all the festivals and special projects of the Sverdlovsk State Philharmonic.

UPO touring history includes over 20 countries and such venues as the Pleyel, Arsenal de Metz, Théâtre Claude Debussy, Corum (Montpellier), Palais des congrès de Paris, Berliner Philharmonie, Elbphilharmonie, Essen Philharmonic, Konzerthaus, Vienna, Brucknerhaus Linz, Royal Concertgebouw, Auditorio de Murcia, Beethovenhalle, Tokyo Bunka Kaikan, Tokyo International Forum, Tokyo Metropolitan Theatre, the Swiss Culture and Congress Center, John F. Kennedy Center for the Performing Arts, Tonhalle, Zürich and Victoria Hall (Geneva), Queen Elizabeth Hall, Grand Hall of the Moscow Conservatory, Saint Petersburg Philharmonia, Mariinsky Theatre, and others.

Ural Philharmonic Orchestra's their discography includes more than 40 albums marked with high ratings, prestigious awards and nominations, such as OPUS Klassik (former Echo Klassik) and International Classical Music Awards.

Ural Philharmonic Orchestra collaborated with conductors Dmitri Kitayenko, Gennady Rozhdestvensky, Krzysztof Penderecki, Leif Segerstam, Mikhail Pletnev, Vladimir Fedoseyev, Alexander Lazarev, Valery Gergiev, Klaus Tennstedt, Jean-Claude Casadesus, Inoue Michiyoshi, Hansjörg Albrecht, Fabio Mastrangelo, Eliahu Inbal, Andrey Boreyko, Gintaras Rinkevičius, Dimitris Botinis and soloists Mstislav Rostropovich, Dmitri Hvorostovsky, Nikolai Petrov, Yuri Bashmet, Viktor Tretyakov, Elisso Virsaladze, Natalia Gutman, Liana Isakadze, Alexander Knyazev, Boris Andrianov, Peter Donohoe, Olga Borodina, Alena Baeva, Benjamin Grosvenor, Henri Demarquette, Olga Peretyatko, Behzod Abduraimov, Boris Berezovsky, Vadim Repin, Nikolai Lugansky, Denis Matsuev, Freddy Kempf, Sergey Krylov, Olga Peretyatko, Branford Marsalis, Dmitry Masleev, Vadym Kholodenko, and other distinguished artists.

The orchestra regularly performs contemporary music and commissions works from the modern composers. In different years, UPO collaborated with Toshio Hosokawa, Ivan Fedele, Alexander Tchaikovsky, Leonid Desyatnikov, René Koering, Eun-Hwa Cho, Anton Batagov, and Olga Viktorova. The orchestra's repertoire has included works by Yuri Falik, Sofia Gubaidulina, Valentin Silvestrov, Avet Terteryan, Arvo Pärt, Galina Ustvolskaya, Nikolay Myaskovsky, Sergei Rachmaninov, Sergei Prokofiev, Dmitri Shostakovich, Igor Stravinsky, Olivier Messiaen, Kaija Saariaho, Krzysztof Penderecki, Gia Kancheli, Rodion Schedrin, Alfred Schnittke, Philip Glass, John Adams, Gabriel Prokofiev.

The orchestra performed at numerous international festivals, including Music Biennale Zagreb, Beethovenfest, Ludwigsburg Festival, Bodensee Festival, Europalia, Festival de La Roque-d'Anthéron, and La Folle Journée in France, Russia, Spain and Japan. The Russian edition of La Folle Journée has taken place at UPO's home, the Sverdlovsk Philharmonic, Yekaterinburg since 2015.

== Conductors ==
=== Principal conductors ===
- Mark Paverman (1936–1938; 1943–1970)
- Alexander Fridlender (1939–1941)
- Nariman Chunikhin (1970–1974)
- Valentin Kozhin (1975–1977)
- Andrey Chistyakov (1978–1988)
- Andrey Boreyko (1990–1992)
- Dmitry Liss (1995–present)

== Co-leaders ==
- Alexander Fridlender (1948–1973)
- Valery Gergiev (1976–1977)
- Leonid Korchmar (1978–1979)
- Alexander Kantorov (1981–1987)
- Ilmar Lapinsh (1989)
- Timur Mynbayev (1989–1990)
- Fedor Gluschenko (1989–1990; 1992–1994)
- Sergey Dyachenko (1990–1992)
- Enkhbaatar Baatarjav (Enkhe) (1996–present)
- Aleksey Dorkin (2004–present)

== Principal guest conductors ==
- Byron Fidetzis (1990–1992)
- Georg Hörtnagel (1992–1993)
- Yury Nikolayevsky (1993–1995)
- Daniel Raiskin (2003–2005)
