= Violin Sonata No. 1 (Prokofiev) =

1946 violin sonata by Sergei Prokofiev

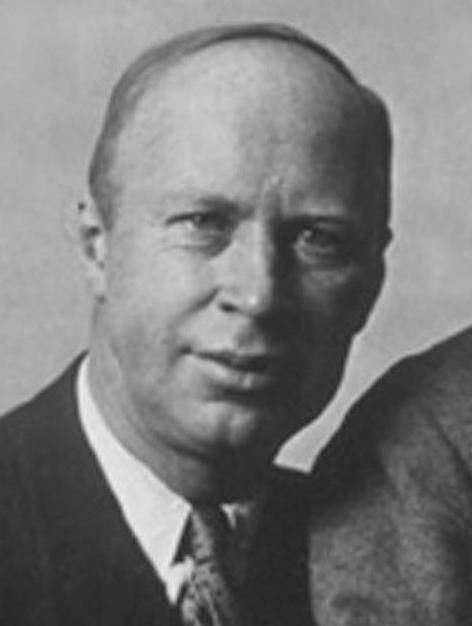
Sergei Prokofiev in 1936

Sergei Prokofiev's Violin Sonata No. 1 in F minor, Op. 80, was composed between 1938 and 1946, two years after Violin Sonata No. 2. Prokofiev was awarded the 1947 Stalin Prize for this composition.

== Structure ==
The work is about 30 minutes long and is in four movements of roughly equal length:

1. Andante assai (F minor)
2. Allegro brusco (C major)
3. Andante (F major)
4. Allegrissimo – Andante assai, come prima (F major → F minor)

Prokofiev had described the slithering violin scales at the end of the 1st and 4th movements as "wind passing through a graveyard".

The violin sonata was premiered by David Oistrakh (violin) and Lev Oborin (piano) on 23 October 1946, coached by the composer. During rehearsals, Oborin played a certain passage, marked forte, too gently for Prokofiev's liking, who insisted it should be more aggressive. Oborin replied that he was afraid of drowning out the violin, but Prokofiev said "It should sound in such a way that people should jump in their seat, and people will say 'Is he out of his mind?'"

The first and third movements of the sonata were played at Prokofiev's funeral by Oistrakh and Samuil Feinberg.
