= Piano Sonata No. 9 (Prokofiev) =

1948 piano sonata by Sergei Prokofiev

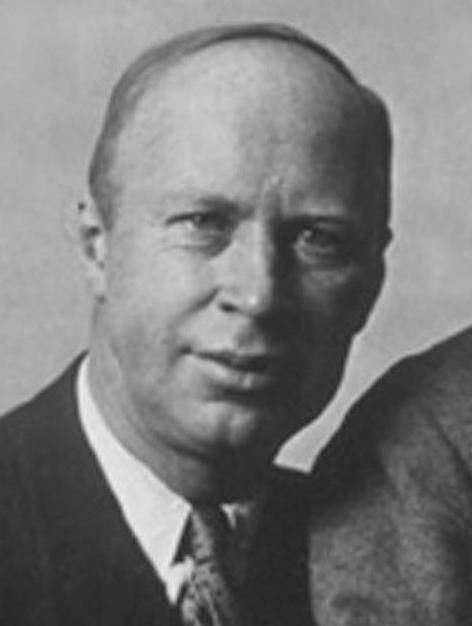
Sergei Prokofiev in 1936

The Piano Sonata No. 9 in C major, Op. 103 by Sergei Prokofiev is his final completed piano sonata. It is dedicated to pianist Sviatoslav Richter.

== Background ==
Prokofiev completed the sonata on September 27, 1947 in the Moscow suburb of Nikolina Gora, although thematic sketches exist from the mid-1940s. Upon introducing the score to its dedicatee, the composer said that he did not think the music was intended to create an effect, and that it was "not the sort of work to raise the roof of the Grand Hall [of the Moscow Conservatory]." Prokofiev had anticipated premiering the work in early 1948, but was prevented from doing so by the Zhdanovschina and the resulting censure he endured. The sonata would not be debuted until April 21, 1951 at a concert in Moscow organized by the Union of Soviet Composers in commemoration of Prokofiev's birthday. The composer himself was too ill to attend, but listened to the performance over the phone.

== Music ==
The sonata is divided into four movements:

1. Allegretto (C major)
2. Allegro strepitoso (G major)
3. Andante tranquillo — Allegro sostenuto — Tempo I (A♭ major)
4. Allegro con brio, ma non troppo presto — Andantino — Allegretto — Tempo I — Poco meno mosso (C major)

Each movement references the next in their respective codas, with the finale recalling the opening movement, thereby creating a cyclical structure.

== Reception ==
"This sonata is very different from the three preceding ones," Prokofiev's wife, Mira Mendelson, wrote in her diary. "It is calm and deep. When I told him that my first impression was of it being both Russian and Beethoven-like, he answered that he himself found both of these qualities present in it." Richter would later confess that he was initially disappointed by the sonata's simplicity, but that he eventually came to "love it very much." Writing seven years after Prokofiev's death, the French critic Claude Samuel praised the music as a "perfect achievement" and the "end of a quest for a 'new simplicity,'" although he also acknowledged that the "new tone" in this late work could be "attributed to the change in character of an ill and aging man, who has exchanged his youthful energy for a more contemplative attitude to life." Boris Berman echoed that sentiment, speculating that "Prokofiev’s [deteriorating] health may also have contributed to the relative lack of sheer motoric energy so typical of his music." Simon Morrison described the sonata as a "modest masterpiece."
