= Cello Sonata No. 1 (Fauré) =

Cello sonata by Gabriel Fauré

Fauré in 1922

The Cello Sonata No. 1 in D minor, Op. 109 is the first of the two cello sonatas by Gabriel Fauré. Composed in 1917 at Saint-Raphaël and Paris, it was premiered on 10 November 1917 at a concert of the Société Nationale de Musique by Gérard Hekking as the cellist and Alfred Cortot as the pianist. At the same concert, the Second Violin Sonata was also premiered. The dedicatee of the work was the cellist Louis Hasselmans, who gave a second performance at the Théâtre des Champs-Élysées in 1918.

== Structure ==
The sonata has three movements:

1. Allegro (3/4, in sonata form with two themes)
2. Andante (3/4, in G minor)
3. Finale: Allegro commodo (4/4, in D major)

The playing time is about twenty minutes.

== Sources ==
- Nectoux, Jean-Michel (1991). Gabriel Fauré – A Musical Life. Roger Nichols (trans.). Cambridge: Cambridge University Press. ISBN 978-0-521-23524-2.
- Tranchefort, François-René (1989). Guide de la musique de chambre. Les indispensables de la musique (in French). Paris: Fayard. p. 322. ISBN 2-213-02403-0.
