= Oleg Malov =

Russian pianist and professor

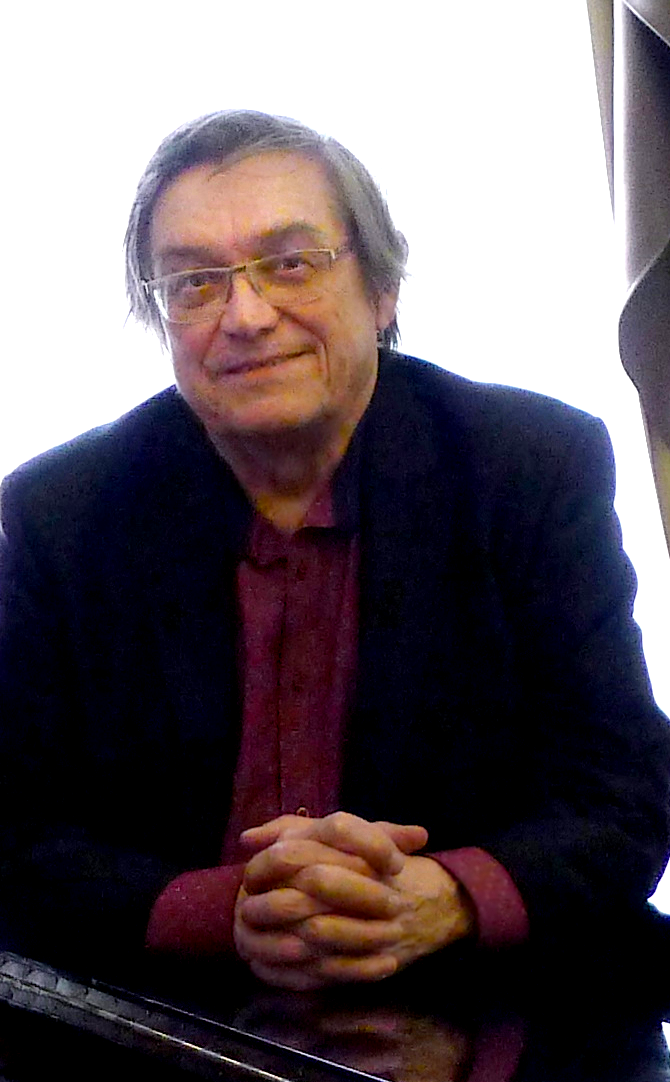
Malov in 2019

Oleg Malov (Russian: Олег Юрьевич Малов; born 23 June 1947 in Gorky, Soviet Union) is a Russian pianist. A professor at the Saint Petersburg Conservatory, he has centered on Russian contemporary music throughout his career. He is best known for his extensive work on Galina Ustvolskaya's music. Oleg Malov performed at the 'Rest is Noise: the music of Alexander Knaifel' in Ireland on 1 May 2009.

Oleg Malov's son, Sergey, is a notable violinist and violist.
