= Galina Ustvolskaya =

Russian composer (1919-2006)

- Ustvolskaya at the piano, c. early 1950s
- Born: 17 June 1919; Petrograd, Russian SFSR
- Died: 22 December 2006 (aged 87); Saint Petersburg, Russia

Galina Ivanovna Ustvolskaya (Russian: Галина Ивановна Уствольская) (17 June 1919 – 22 December 2006), was a Russian composer of classical music.

Known by Dutch critic Elmer Schönberger as "the lady with the hammer", her music has been described as demanding "everything from the performer", uncompromising in her trademark textured homophonic blocks of sound. Ustvolskaya created her own unique style, characterized by unusual combinations of instruments that created highly specific tone clusters and textures and by her large dynamic ranges.

She was reclusive and rarely agreed to be interviewed, as she found it unpleasant to talk about her own music. In her lifetime, she only approved 21 of her works for performance.

== Early years ==
Galina Ustvolskaya was born in Petrograd (modern day St. Petersburg). Her mother was a school teacher; her father was a lawyer. Her early childhood took place during the Russian Civil War and the October Revolution. Despite her impoverished childhood and non-musical family, from a young age she developed an interest in music. She was deemed to be gifted when she began musical studies at the age of 7.

== Middle years ==
Ustvolskaya studied at the Leningrad Conservatory from 1937 to 1939. Her teachers included Dmitri Shostakovich; at the time, she was the only woman in his composition class. She was his pupil from 1939 to 1941; after World War II, she resumed studies from January 1947 to March 1948. From late 1944 to the end of 1946 she was also a pupil of Maximilian Steinberg. From late 1947 until 1952, she pursued postgraduate studies under the guidance of Viktor Voloshinov.

Shostakovich held Ustvolskaya in high regard, consulted her during the composition of some of his works, and treated her as a colleague. He also quoted her Clarinet Trio in his String Quartet No. 5 and Suite on Verses of Michelangelo Buonarroti. He once wrote, "I am convinced that the music of ... Ustvolskaya will achieve world fame and be valued by all who hold truth to be the essential element of music". On another occasion he told her, "It is not you who are under my influence, but I who am under yours". He also told her, "I am a talent, you are a phenomenon".

After the death of his first wife, Shostakovich proposed marriage to Ustvolskaya, but she declined. In an interview for the TV program Tsarskaya Lozha, which commemorated Ustvolskaya's 80th birthday, she said, "It is sad that Shostakovich and myself were not 'soul mates'; I know that he liked me and always treated me with respect, but I never reciprocated his feelings".

Later in life she rebuked Shostakovich and his music. To her publisher, she wrote, "One thing remains as clear as day: a seemingly eminent figure such as Shostakovich, to me, is not eminent at all, on the contrary, he burdened my life and killed my best feelings".

Ustvolskaya's early works over the 1940s and 50s showed many similarities to the socialist realism and modernism. The Soviet Union at the time censored a lot of music styles, resulting in many composers, including Ustvolskaya, being accused of formalism, an abstract composition technique. Out of necessity, Ustvolskaya had to create accessible works within the censorship rules. One of her compositions, a tone poem based on a heroic tale for bass and symphony orchestra, Stepan Razin's Dream, was nominated for a Stalin Prize.

Throughout the 1950s, she composed propagandistic works acceptable to the Soviet leadership while also secretly writing, in her own unique style, works she thought might never be heard. None of these works in the latter category were performed until 1961. She later sought to destroy her non-spiritual works, some of which had accompanied Soviet propaganda films.

== Later years and death ==
In 1962, Ustvolskaya decided to concentrate on composing without regard for political compromise. Beginning in the mid-1960s, the Soviet interest in modernist music increased, resulting in wider recognition of Ustvolskaya's music. Eventually the Leningrad branch of the Union of Composers organized performances of her music, which were praised by listeners and critics. International awareness began with several concerts of her music at the 1989 Holland Festival.

Ustvolskaya was reclusive and never talked about her personal life. In later years, she attended only a few concerts of her own music in Europe.

In 1998 she decscribed her life to an interviewer:

The works written by me were often hidden for long periods. But then if they did not satisfy me, I destroyed them. I do not have drafts; I compose at the table, without an instrument. Everything is thought out with such care that it only needs to be written down. I'm always in my thoughts. I spend the nights thinking as well, and therefore do not have time to relax. Thoughts gnaw [at] me. My world possesses me completely, and I understand everything in my own way. I hear, I see, and I act differently from others. I just live my lonely life.

Ustvolskaya died on 22 December 2006 in Saint Petersburg. Her manuscripts are stored in the archive of the Paul Sacher Stiftung since 1994.

== Style ==
"There is no link whatsoever between my music and that of any other composer, living or dead", Ustvolskaya said of her own music. Among its characteristics are the use of repeated, homophonic blocks of sound – which prompted the Dutch critic Elmer Schönberger to call her "the lady with the hammer" – unusual combinations of instruments, use of extreme dynamics, the employment of groups of instruments to introduce tone clusters, sparse harmonic textures, and the use of piano or percussion to beat out unchanging rhythms. Ustvolskaya's music has been described by critics and scholars as carrying "the bleakness of one who stares into the void on a regular basis" and as evoking "visceral feelings of horror". Many have attributed influences to her work, all of which Ustvolskaya has denied. However in her early years she considered Modest Mussorgsky, Gustav Mahler and Igor Stravinsky among her influences.

Despite her reclusiveness, Ustvolskaya commented publicly on the spiritual aspects of her music. She often incorporated religious texts, especially in her later works, though she insisted that none of her pieces conform to the beliefs of a specific religion. In an interview, her friend and publisher Viktor Suslin stated that her music is not liturgical and should not be labelled as religious, but rather that it "springs directly from the contact she feels with God". When discussing her compositional process, Ustvolskaya once said that she only composed when she "fell into a state of grace" inspired by God and that "each work has a very long period of coming into being, after which she simply writes it down". When offered a commission, she wrote: "If God gives me the opportunity to compose something, then I will do it without fail". Ustvolskaya was not a member of a religious community, but it is evident that she was greatly inspired by her spiritual connection to God and that it was integral to her compositional process.

The music of Galina Ustvolskaya was not openly censured in the USSR. However, she was accused by her colleagues of being unwilling to communicate and of "narrowness" and "obstinacy". Though many who knew Ustvolskaya perceive the Western sentiment toward her compositions to be one of rebellion and grandiosity, with pianist Oleg Malov even calling her methods a totalitarian fight against Soviet Russia's totalitarian regime, resulting in "double totalitarianism". While her propensity for a grandiose attitude was seemingly present in her personal life, and noted by several students and colleagues, she never composed "for money", except for her commissioned works from 1949–1962, and mainly thought of herself and her music as being misunderstood by those around her.

It has long been speculated that Ustvolskaya hid or destroyed compositions that did not meet the government's expectations of socialist realism for music, however she stated in an interview with biographer Olga Gladkova - whose book Galina Ustvolskaya: Music as Obsession seemingly has a controversial reputation amongst Ustvolskaya's contemporaries - that her main source of inspiration was God, claiming, "I begin to write when I enter a special state of grace. Music is born in me, and when the time comes, I record it. If the time doesn't come, I destroy it". But, when asked if she viewed her own compositions as Russian, Ustvolskaya noted that Da Vinci, Rembrandt, Bach, and Beethoven are not mainly associated with their nationalities and that their art is "higher" than such labels. She continued, "I only accept such work, meaning all types of art".

Moreover, one of Ustvolskaya's contemporaries, pianist Tatyana Voronina, likened the former's compositional style to a prisoner's shackles. In an interview, Voronina said that Ustvolskaya's use of rhythmic, repeating crotchets expressed a "dark, somewhat schizophrenic worldview". This sentiment was echoed by Soviet musicologist Ekaterina Ruchevskaya, who claimed of Ustvolskaya's alleged mental instability, "Whether or not there were some mental problems, I cannot say for sure, but I knew of one suicide attempt..."

== In literature ==
Ustvolskaya's relationship with Shostakovich from her time as a student through the 1950s is fictionalized in William T. Vollmann's historical novel Europe Central.

== Legacy and remembrance ==
From 1947 to 1977 she taught composition at Leningrad Conservatory. She taught her students to write polyphonically and contrapuntally, showing them works by Mahler and Stravinsky when they were permitted in the 1960s. Her teaching style was more focused on aesthetics and feeling instead of harmony or scientific technique, and often encouraged students to experiment with modes instead of the typical major or minor scales.

Ustvolskaya's music is described as incredibly expressive; her choice of unusual instrumentation, extreme dynamics, tone clusters and blocks of textures all contribute to her unique style as a spiritual composer. "My music is my life", she stated. Despite the national events surrounding her upbringing, Ustvolskaya showed no interest in history, politics, or social matters. Her art was her only interest, occupying all of her time and thoughts until her death.

== Works ==
Ustvolskaya's oeuvre is small, with only 21 pieces in her characteristic style (i.e. excluding the public, Soviet-style works).

- Concerto for piano, full string orchestra and timpani (1946)
- Sonata for cello and piano (1946) (destroyed)
- Piano Sonata No. 1 (1947)
- The Dream of Stepan Razin (Сон Степана Разина – Son Stepana Razina) Bylina for bass and symphony orchestra (Russian folk text, 1949)
- Trio for clarinet, violin and piano (1949)
- Piano Sonata No. 2 (1949)
- Octet for two oboes, four violins, timpani and piano (1950)
- Sinfonietta (1951) (destroyed)
- Piano Sonata No. 3 (1952)
- Violin Sonata (1952)
- Twelve Preludes for piano (1953)
- Symphony No. 1, for two boys' voices and orchestra (Text by Gianni Rodari, 1955)
- Suite for orchestra (1955)
- Piano Sonata No. 4 (1957)
- Symphonic Poem No. 1 (1959)
- Symphonic Poem No. 2 (1957)
- Grand Duet for piano and cello (1959)
- Duet for piano and violin (1964)
- Composition No. 1 Dona Nobis Pacem, for piccolo, tuba and piano (1971)
- Composition No. 2 Dies Irae, for eight double basses, piano and wooden cube (1973)
- Composition No. 3 Benedictus, Qui Venit, for four flutes, four bassoons and piano (1975)
- Symphony No. 2 - True and Eternal Bliss!, for male reciter and small orchestra (1979)
- Symphony No. 3 - Jesus Messiah, Save Us!, for male reciter and small orchestra (1983)
- Symphony No. 4 - Prayer, for contralto, piano, trumpet and tam-tam (1985/7)
- Piano Sonata No. 5 (1986)
- Piano Sonata No. 6 (1988)
- Symphony No. 5 - Amen, for male reciter, oboe, trumpet, tuba, violin and wooden cube (1989/90)

== Discography ==
- Composition No. 1

– Zoon / Oostendorp / Malov RN (Radio Netherlands)
– Renggli / Le Clair / Schroeder Hat Art CD 6130
– Tokarev / Arbuszov / Malov Megadisc MDC 7867
– Members of the Schönberg Ensemble / de Leeuw* Philips 442 532-2
– Osten/ Hilgers / Hagen Koch 31 170-2 H1

- Composition No. 2

– Propischin / Kolosov / Goryachev / Vulik / Kovulenko / Peresipkin / Sokolov / Nefedov / Javmertchik / Sandovskaya / Malov Megadisc MDC 7867, Megadisc MDC 7858
– Schönberg Ensemble / de Leeuw* Philips 442 532-2

- Composition No. 3

– Amsterdam Wind Ensemble / Friesen RN (Radio Netherlands) Globe 6903
– Danilina / Osipova / Rodina / Tokarev / Makarov / Shevchuk / Sokolov / Krasnik / Sandovskaya / Malov Megadisc MDC 7867
– Schönberg Ensemble / de Leeuw* Philips 442 532-2
– Jones / Coffin / Keen / Stevenson / O'Neill / Antcliffe / Newman / McNaughton / Stephenson / Stephenson Conifer 75605 51 194-2

- Concerto for Piano, String Orchestra and Timpani

– Lubimov / Deutsche Kammerphilharmonie / Schiff Erato 0630 12 709-2
– Seribryakov / Chamber Orchestra of the Leningrad Philharmonic / Malov. Musica Non Grata Series. Melodiya BMG 74321 49 956-2

- Duet for Violin and Piano

– Beths / de Leeuw* Hat Art CD 6115
– Shustin / Malov Megadisc MDC 7863
– Rissin / Rissin-Morenova SST 30211

- Grand Duet for Violoncello and Piano

– Stolpner / Malov ... (LP) Melodia C10 23283 007, Musica Non Grata Series. Melodiya BMG 74321 49 956-2
– Vassiliev / Malov Megadisc MDC 7863
– Uitti / Malov RN (Radio Netherlands)
– Kooistra / Denyer* Etcetera KTC 1170
– de Saram / Schroeder Hat Art CD 6130
– Beiser / Oldfather Koch 37 301-2 H1
– Rostropovich / Lubimov EMI 572016-2 *Ustvolskaya's preferred recording

- Octet for 2 Oboes, 4 Violins, Timpani and Piano

– Kossoyan / Tchinakov / Stang / Liskovich / Dukor / Soakov / Snamenski / Karandashova (LP) Melodia C10 0 715 152 Musica Non Grata Series. Melodiya BMG 74321 49 956-2
– Neretin / Tosenko / Stang / Ritalchenko / Lukin / Tkachenko / Znamenskii / Malov Megadisc MDC 7865
– Bohling / Tindale / Fletcher / Muszaros / Tombling /Iwabucchi / Cole / Stephenson* Conifer 75605 51 194-2

- Piano Sonata

– Malov / Liss / Ural Philharmonic Orchestra (CD) Megadisc MDC 7856 (2000)

- Sonata for Piano No. 1

– Malov(LP) Melodia C10 23 283 007, Megadisc MDC 7876
– Denyer* Conifer 75605 51 262-2
– Schroeder HEK Hat 6170
– Hinterhäuser COL Legno WWE 20019

- Sonata for Piano No. 2

– Malov Megadisc MDC 7876, Megadisc MDC 7858
– Denyer Conifer 75605 51 262-2
– Vedernikov* Teichiku TECC – 28170
– Schroeder HEK HAT 6170
– Hinterhäuser COL Legno WWE 20019

- Sonata for Piano No. 3

– Malov Melodia C10 0715 152 (LP), Megadisc MDC 7876, Musica Non Grata Series. Melodiya BMG 74321 49 956-2
– Denyer* Conifer 75605 51 262-2
– Karlen ECM 449936-2
– Schroeder HEK Hat 6170
– Hinterhäuser COL Legno WWE 20019

- Sonata for Piano No. 4

– Malov (LP) Melodia C10 23283 007, Megadisc MDC 7876
– Denyer* Conifer 75605 51 262-2
– Varsi Mediaphon 72. 158
– Schroeder HEK Hat 6170
– Hinterhäuser COL Legno WWE 20019

- Sonata for Piano No. 5

– de Leeuw* Hat Art CD 6115
– Denyer Etcetera KTC 1170, Conifer 75605 51 262-2
– Malov Megadisc MDC 7876, MEGADISC MDC 7858
– de Leeuw WD 02 (Wittener Tage für neue Kammermusik)
– Karlen ECM 449 936-2
– Schroeder HEK Hat 6170
– Hinterhäuser COL Legno WWE 20019

- Sonata for Piano No. 6

– Malov Megadisc MDC 7876 Megadisc MDC 8000
– Denyer* Conifer 75605 51 262-2
– Mukaiyama BVHAAST CD 9406
– Arden Koch 37 301-2 H1, KOCH 37 603-2 H1
– Schroeder HEK Hat 6170
– Hinterhäuser COL Legno WWE 20019

- Sonata for Violin and Piano

– Shustin / Malov Megadisc MDC 7865
– Rissin / Rissin-Morenova SST 30211

- Symphony No. 1

– Malov / Liss / Ural Philharmonic Orchestra (CD) Megadisc MDC 7856 (2000)

- Symphony No. 2 – True and Eternal Bliss

– The St. Petersburg Soloists / Malov / Liss Megadisc MDC 7854

- Symphony No. 3 – Jesus Messiah, Save Us!

– The St. Petersburg Soloists / Malov / Liss Megadisc MDC 7854
– Symphonieorchester des Bayerischen Rundfunks / Stenz / Sherstanoi Megadisc MDC 7858

- Symphony No. 4 – Prayer

– van Vliet / Konink / Denyer / Meeuwsen Etcetera KTC 1170, Megadisc MDC 8000
– Marrs / Keemss / Miller / Sperber Mediaphon MED 72 115
– The St. Petersburg Soloists / Malov / Liss Megadisc MDC 7854

- Symphony No. 5 – Amen

– Leiferkus / Fletcher / Bohling / Hultmark / Powell / Cole / Stephenson CONIFER 75605 51 194-2
– The St. Petersburg Soloists / Malov / Liss MEGADISC MDC 7854

- Twelve Preludes for Piano

– Schroeder Hat Art CD 6130
– Malov Megadisc MDC 7867
– Arden* Koch 37 301-2 H1

- Trio for Clarinet, Violin and Piano

– Beths / de Boer / de Leeuw* Hat Art CD 6115
– Keser / Anderson / Denyer* Etcetera KTC 1170
– Shustin / Feodorov / Malov Megadisc MDC 7865
