= Dmitry Liss =

Russian conductor

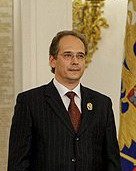
Dmitry Liss

Dmitry Ilyich Liss (Russian: Дми́трий Ильи́ч Лисс; born October 28, 1960) is a Russian conductor. He is also the artistic director and chief conductor of the Ural Philharmonic Orchestra.

== Biography ==
Born at October 28, 1960 in Balashov, Saratov Oblast of Russia, Dmitry Liss is a graduate of the Moscow Conservatory. Upon graduation from the conservatory in 1984 he became a conductor of the Kuzbass Symphony Orchestra. In 1991 he was appointed to the position of Chief Conductor of this orchestra and at this time became the youngest chief conductor in Russia. Since 1995, Dmitry Liss has served as Artistic Director/Chief Conductor of the Ural Philharmonic Orchestra. Most recently, Liss was appointed Associate Conductor of the Russian National Orchestra (1999). In 1997–1999 he was Principal Russian Conductor of the American Russian Youth Orchestra.

== Activities ==
He has taken part in numerous international festivals and has recorded CDs for a variety of American, Russian, Japanese, Taiwanese, Belgian and Swiss companies.

== Awards ==
- Winner of the 1st International Competition of Young Conductors Lovro von Matačić (Zagreb, 1995).
- Artist Emeritus of Russia
