= List of symphonies with names =

While most symphonies have a number, many symphonies are known by their (nick)name.

This article lists symphonies that are numbered and have an additional nickname, and symphonies that are primarily known by their name and/or key. Also various compositions that contain "symphony" or "sinfonia" in their name are included, whether or not strictly speaking they adhere to the format of a classical symphony.

Sinfonia concertante is a different genre, and works of that genre are not included here, unless for those named works that are usually known as a symphony.

Composer	No.	Key	Original name	Translation	Date	Additional information
Selman Ada	1		Turkish		2004	
Fritz Adam	2		Symphonie vosgienne	Vosges symphony		See: Vosges
Kalevi Aho	7		Insect Symphony		1988	
Kalevi Aho	12		Luosto		2002–03	See: Luosto
Kalevi Aho	13		Symphonic Characterizations		2003	
Kalevi Aho	14		Rituals		2007	
Kalevi Aho	17		Sinfonisia freskoja	Symphonic Frescoes	2017	
Necil Kazım Akses	4		Sinfonia Romanesca Fantasia		1982–84	
Necil Kazım Akses	5		Thus spoke Atatürk; Sinfonia Rhetorica	Rhetoric Symphony	1988	
Necil Kazım Akses	6		Ölümsüz Kahramanlar	Immortal Heroes	1992	
Yasushi Akutagawa			Trinita Sinfonica	Symphonic Trinity	1948	
Yasushi Akutagawa	1		Prima Sinfonia	First Symphony	1954, revised 1955	
Yasushi Akutagawa			Twin Stars		1957	For Children's choir, text made by Kenji Miyazawa, and for youth symphony
Yasushi Akutagawa			Ellora Symphony		1958	
Hugo Alfvén	4	C minor	Från havsbandet	From the Outskirts of the Archipelago	1919	
Charles-Valentin Alkan		C minor–E♭ minor	Symphonie pour piano seul	Symphony for solo piano	1857	Numbers 4–7 of Douze Études dans tous les tons mineurs, Op. 39, for solo piano
Zoltan Almashi			Symphony of Dialogues			
Zoltan Almashi	2		Island			
Flor Alpaerts	1		Lentesymfonie	Slow Symphony	1906	
Louis Andriessen			Symfonie voor losse snaren	Symphony for Open Strings	1978	
Edmund Angerer		G major		Toy Symphony		Cassation for toys, 2 oboes, 2 horns, strings and continuo
George Antheil	1		Zingaresca		1920–22, revised 1923	
George Antheil	3		American		1936–39, revised 1946	
George Antheil	4		1942		1942	
George Antheil	5		Joyous		1947–48	
George Antheil	6		After Delacroix		1947–48	
Blaž Arnič	1		Te Deum		1932	
Blaž Arnič	3		Duma		1929–42	
Blaž Arnič	4		Resurrectionis	Resurrection	1931–42	
Blaž Arnič	5		Vojne vihre	War Whirlwinds	1941	Also called Partikularna
Blaž Arnič	6		Samorastnik		1950	
Blaž Arnič	7		Simfonija dela	Labour Symphony	1948	
Blaž Arnič	8		Na domači grudi	On Native Land	1951	
Blaž Arnič	9		Vojna in mir	War and Peace	1960	
Malcolm Arnold			Toy Symphony		1957	See Toy Symphony (section "Other Toy Symphonies") for more information.
Florencio Asenjo	2		Maximalist		1978	
Florencio Asenjo	3		Crystallizations		1987	
Florencio Asenjo	4		Outpourings		2003	
Florencio Asenjo	5		Ubiquity		2003	
Florencio Asenjo	6		Passion and Apotheosis		2004	In 2 movements 1. Passion 2. Apotehosis
Florencio Asenjo	7		Resonances		2006	
Kurt Atterberg	3	D major	Västkustbilder	West-Coast Images	1914-16	Inspired by the coast village of Lysekil, located in the west coast of Sweden
Kurt Atterberg	4	G minor	Sinfonia piccola	Little Symphony	1918	Based on themes of Swedish folk music
Kurt Atterberg	5	D minor	Sinfonia funebre	Funeral Symphony	1917-22	
Kurt Atterberg	6	C major	Dollar symphony		1927-28	Popularly nicknamed for winning the 1928 International Columbia Graphophone Competition.
Kurt Atterberg	7	A minor	Sinfonia Romantica	Romantic Symphony	1941-42	Based on themes from his 1932 opera "Fanal".
Kurt Atterberg	9	B♭ minor	Sinfonia visionaria	Visionary Symphony	1955-56	
Lera Auerbach	1		Chimera		2006	The final two movements form a symphonic poem called Icarus
Lera Auerbach	2		Requiem for a Poet		2006	For mezzo-soprano, cello, choir and orchestra
Lera Auerbach	3		The Infant Minstrel and His Peculiar Menagerie		2016	
Zvi Avni				Desert Scenes Symphony		
Henk Badings	6		Psalmensymphonie	Psalm Symphony	1953	
Henk Badings	7		Louisville		1954	
Henk Badings	11		Sinfonia Giocosa	Playful Symphony	1964	
Henk Badings	12		Symphonische Klangfiguren	Symphonic Sound Figures	1964	
Henk Badings	14		Symphonic Triptych		1968	
Henk Badings	15		Conflicts and Confluences		1983	
Acario Cotapos Baeza			El Pajaro Burlón	The Mockingbird		
Konstantin Batashov	2		Киевская	Kyiv	1982	
Arnold Bax			Spring Fire		1913	Mixture of a symphony and a symphonic poem
Amy Beach	1	E minor	Gaelic Symphony		1894	Op. 32
Gustavo Becerra-Schmidt	2		De Profundis		1957	
Ludwig van Beethoven	3	E♭ major	Eroica	Heroic	1803–1804	Op. 55. Premiered 1805 see also List of works by Beethoven#Symphonies
Ludwig van Beethoven	5	C minor	Schicksalssinfonie	Fate Symphony	1804–1808	Op. 67. Premiered 1808
Ludwig van Beethoven	6	F major	Pastorale	Pastoral	1804–1808	Op. 68. Premiered 1808
Ludwig van Beethoven			Siegessinfonie; Wellingtons Sieg oder die Schlacht bei Vittoria	Battle Symphony; Wellington's Victory, or, the Battle of Vitoria	1813	Op. 91. Premiered 1813 for panharmonicon commissioned by instrument's inventor, later arranged for orchestra
Ludwig van Beethoven	9	D minor		Choral	1817–1824	Op. 125. Premiered 1824
Victor Bendix	1	C major	Fjældstigning	Mountain Climbing	1882	
Victor Bendix	2	D major	Sommerklange fra Sydrusland	Summer sound from South Russia	1888	
Pascal Bentoiu	6		Culori	Colours	1985	Op. 28
Pascal Bentoiu	7		Volume	Volumes	1986	Op. 29
Pascal Bentoiu	8		Imagini	Images	1987	Op. 30
Theodor Berger	1		Chronique symphonie	Chronic symphony	1940–53	Op. 10
Theodor Berger	2		Homerische Symphonie	Homeric Symphony	1948	Was used in the 1948–49 Austrian drama film On Resonant Shores
Theodor Berger	3		Sinfonia Parabolica	Parabolic Symphony	1956	
Theodor Berger	4		Symphonischer Triglyph "Drei Fenster"	Triglyph Symphony "Three Windows"	1957	"Metamorphoses" for orchestra on motifs by Franz Schubert
Theodor Berger	5		Symphonie Jahreszeiten	Symphony of Seasons	1957	
Theodor Berger	6		Hydromelos		1965	Based on water-tone music
William Bergsma	2		Voyages		1976	
Hector Berlioz	1		Symphonie fantastique	Fantastic Symphony	1830	
Hector Berlioz	2		Harold en Italie	Harold in Italy	1834	
Hector Berlioz	3		Roméo et Juliette	Romeo and Juliet	1839	
Hector Berlioz	4		Grande symphonie funèbre et triomphale	Grand Funereal and Triumphal Symphony	1840	
Leonard Bernstein	1		Jeremiah		1939-42	
Leonard Bernstein	2		The Age of Anxiety		1947-49	
Leonard Bernstein	3		Kaddish		1961-63	
Franz Berwald	1		Sérieuse	Serious Symphony		
Franz Berwald	2		Capricieuse	Capricious Symphony		
Franz Berwald	3		Singulière	Singular Symphony		
Franz Berwald	4		Naïve			
Georges Bizet	2	C major	Roma	Rome Symphony	1860-66, revised until Bizet's death	
José Ignacio Blesa Lull	1		La Balada de la Tríada	The Ballad of the Triad		Based on the trilogy of novels "Memorias de Idhún" by Laura Gallego García
José Ignacio Blesa Lull	2		El Gran Místico	The Great Mystic		Based on the life of philosopher and mystic Ramon Llull
José Ignacio Blesa Lull	3		El Compositor de Tormentas	The Composer of Storms		Inspired by the novel "The Composer of Storms" by Andrés Pascual
Arthur Bliss			A Colour Symphony		1921-22	
Karl-Birger Blomdahl	3		Facetter	Facets	1950	
Felix Blumenfeld	1	C minor	À la mémoire des chers défunts	To the Dear Beloved	1906	Op. 39
Manuel Palau Boix	2	D major	Murciana	Murcian	1943	
Emmanuel Bondeville	1		Symphonie lyrique	Lyrical symphony	1956	
Emmanuel Bondeville	2		Symphonie chorégraphique	Choreographic symphony	1961	
Nikita Bogoslovsky	4	D major		Pastorale	1979	
Nikita Bogoslovsky	5	A minor		Theatrical	1981	
Nikita Bogoslovsky	8	C minor		The Last	1986	For mezzo-soprano, three female voices, and orchestra.
Jacques Bondon	1		Symphonie Latine	Latin Symphony	1973	
Hakon Børresen	2	A major	Havet	The Ocean	1904	
Alexander Borodin	2		Богатырская Симфония	Symphony of Heroes		nickname first used by Vladimir Stasov
Sergei Bortkiewicz	1	D major	З моєї Батьківщини	From my homeland	1945	Op. 52
Derek Bourgeois	4		A Wine Symphony		1978	
Derek Bourgeois	6		A Cotswold Symphony		1988	
Derek Bourgeois	7		The First Two Thousand Years		1999	
Derek Bourgeois	8		The Mountains of Mallorca		2002	
Derek Bourgeois	13		The Unlucky		2003	
Derek Bourgeois	16		Songs of Mallorca		2004	
Derek Bourgeois	41		Sinfonia Andalucia	Andalusian Symphony	2007	
Derek Bourgeois	42		Life, the Universe and Everything		2009	
Derek Bourgeois	45		What Ho! Symphony		2009	
Derek Bourgeois	46		A Dorset Symphony		2009	
Derek Bourgeois	52		The Halfway		2009	
Derek Bourgeois	53		Sinfonia Semplice	Simple Symphony	2010	
Derek Bourgeois	59		Percussion Symphony		2010	
Derek Bourgeois	67		The Tuneful		2011	
Derek Bourgeois	72		The Ghost		2012	
Derek Bourgeois	87		Four British Seasons		2013	
Derek Bourgeois	94		The Predictable		2014	
Derek Bourgeois	98		Organ Symphony		2015	
Derek Bourgeois	101		The Sundial		2015	
Derek Bourgeois	103		The Swiss Roll		2015	
Derek Bourgeois	104		The Esterhazy		2015	
Derek Bourgeois	105		Symphony of Classical Forms		2015	
Derek Bourgeois	111		The Nelson		2016	
Francis Bousquet			Hannibal		1942	
Ina Boyle	1		Glencree		1927	
Ina Boyle	2		The Dream of the Rood		1930	
Johannes Brahms	1			Beethoven's Tenth		nickname first used by Hans von Bülow
Johannes Brahms	3					suggested to be called "Heroic", name rejected by Brahms
Havergal Brian	1	D minor	The Gothic		1919-27	
Havergal Brian	4	C major	Das Siegeslied	The Song of Victory	1932-33	
Havergal Brian	5		Wine of Summer		1937	
Havergal Brian	6		Sinfonia Tragica	Tragic Symphony	1947-48	
Havergal Brian	22	F minor	Symphonia Brevis	Short Symphony		
Havergal Brian	23	C major	Sinfonia Grandis	Grand Symphony		conceived, but rejected in the end by the composer
George Frederick Bristow			Arcadian		1872	Also called "The Pioneer"
George Frederick Bristow	2	D minor	Jullien		1856	
Benjamin Britten			Simple Symphony			
Benjamin Britten			Sinfonia da Requiem	Requiem Symphony		
Benjamin Britten			Spring Symphony			
Benjamin Britten			Cello Symphony		1963	full title: Symphony for Cello and Orchestra; Op. 68. Premiered 1964
Stephen Brown			The Northern Journey			
Yevgeny Brusilovsky	3			The Golden Steppe	1944	
Yevgeny Brusilovsky	6			On a Theme of Kurmangazy	1965	
Anton Bruckner	00	F minor	00			student work written prior to No. 1
Anton Bruckner	0	D minor	Nullte			written after No. 1 and before No. 2
Anton Bruckner	2	C minor		Symphony of Pauses		
Anton Bruckner	3	D minor		Wagner Symphony		
Anton Bruckner	4	E♭ major		Romantic		
Anton Bruckner	5	B♭ major		Pizzicato/Tragic/Church of Faith/Fantastic		the name is not used anymore
Anton Bruckner	8	C minor		Apocalyptic		the name is not used anymore
Alfredo Buenaventura	2		Dakilang Lahi		1974	
Alan Bush	2	G major	The Nottingham Symphony		1949	
Alan Bush	3		The Byron Symphony		1959-60	
Alan Bush	4		Lascaux Symphony		1982-83	
Charles Wakefield Cadman		E minor	Pennsylvania Symphony		1939	
Pierre Capdevielle	3		Sinfonia da camera		1952–53	
Elliott Carter	3		Symphonia: "Sum fluxae pretium spei"	Symphony: "I am the prize of flowing hope"	1993-96	Inspired by the poem "Bulla" (The Bubble) by Richard Crashaw
Carlos Chávez	1		Sinfonía de Antígona	Symphony of Antigone		
Carlos Chávez	2		Sinfonía india	Indian Symphony		
Carlos Chávez	4		Sinfonía romántica	Romantic Symphony		
Carlos Chávez			Caballos de vapor: sinfonía de baile	Horse Power: Dance Symphony	1926–1932	
Carlos Chávez			Llamadas: sinfonía proletaria	Calls [to Arms]: Proletarian Symphony	1934	
Jeffrey Ching	2		Symphony No. 2, "The Imp of the Perverse"		1992	Based on a story by Edgar Allan Poe
Jeffrey Ching	3		Rituals		1997–98	Philippine government commission for the centennial of the country's independence. Single movement.
Jeffrey Ching	4		明律回音 (in China) or Souvenir des Mings	Echo of the Ming Pitch-pipes (in China) or Memories of the Ming [dynasty]	2002	
Jeffrey Ching	5		Kunstkammer	Cabinet of curiosities	2004–05	See Cabinet of curiosities
Zhang Chun			Shengli jiaoxiangyue	Victory Symphony	1956	
Ján Cikker	2			Spring	1937	
Ján Cikker	3		1945		1975	
Richard Clayderman	1		Zodiacal Symphony		1988	
Muzio Clementi	3		The Great National			
Gloria Coates	1		Music on Open Strings		1972	
Gloria Coates	2		Illuminatio in Tenebris	Enlightenment in the Dark	1973/74	Also called Music on Abstract Lines
Gloria Coates	4		Chiaroscuro		1984 revised 1989/1990	
Gloria Coates	5		Drei mystische Gesänge	Three mystical Chants	1985	For choir and orchestra, choir text by the composer's daughter Alexandra Coates
Gloria Coates	6		Music in Microtones		1985/86	
Gloria Coates	8		Indian Sounds		1990/91	
Gloria Coates	9		Homage to Van Gogh		1992/94	
Gloria Coates	10		Drones of Druids on Celtic Ruins		1993	
Gloria Coates	14		The Americans		2001/02	
Gloria Coates	15		Homage to Mozart		2004/05	
Gloria Coates	16		Time Frozen		1993	
Edward Joseph Collins	1	B minor	Nos habeit humus		1925	
Paul Constantinescu	2		Simfonia Ploieșteană	The Ploieștean Symphony	1961	
Aaron Copland			Organ Symphony			Copland's Symphony No. 1 is an arrangement of this symphony without the organ
Aaron Copland	2		Short Symphony		1934	
Aaron Copland			Dance Symphony			arrangement of music from the ballet Grohg
Henry Cowell	2		Anthropos			
Henry Cowell	3		Gaelic		1942	
Henry Cowell	4		Short Symphony		1946	
Henry Cowell	11		Seven Rituals of Music		1954	
Henry Cowell	13		Madras		1958	Madras is the former name of Chennai, where the composer studied Indian music
Henry Cowell	15		Thesis		1961	
Henry Cowell	16		Icelandic		1962	
Henry Cowell	17		Lancaster		1962?	
Frederic Cowen	3	C minor	Scandinavian		1880	
Frederic Cowen	4	B♭ minor	The Welsh		1884	
Frederic Cowen	6	E major	Idyllic		1897	
Paul Creston	3		Three Mysteries		1950	Sheet music available here
Dimitrie Cuclin	16		Triumful păcii	Triumphs of Peace	1959	
Dimitrie Cuclin	20		Triumful infrăţirii popolarelor	Triumph in the Union of People	1972	
Ikuma Dan	4		1965 Kanagawa		1965	
Ikuma Dan	5		Suruga		1965	
Ikuma Dan	6		Hiroshima		1985	For soprano, nohkan, shinobue, and orchestra with text being written by Edmund Blunden
Ikuma Dan	7		Jashūmon		Unfinished	
Richard Danielpour	3		Journey without Distance			
Michael Daugherty	1		Metropolis Symphony		1988-93	
Félicien David			Le désert	The desert	1844	An "ode-symphonie", for more information read: here
Félicien David			Christoph Colomb	Christopher Columbus	1847	Also an "ode-symphonie", for the text (ode), see: here
William L. Dawson	1		Negro Folk Symphony		1934	
Peter Maxwell Davies	8		Antarctic		2001	Op. 215
Peter Maxwell Davies	10		Alla ricerca di Borromini	Looking for Borromini	2013	Op. 327
Edmond Dédé	1		Quasimodo Symphony		1865	
Yvonne Desportes	1		Saint-Gingolph		1958	See Saint-Gingolph
Yvonne Desportes	2		Monorythmie	Monorhythm	1964	
Yvonne Desportes	3		L'Éternel féminin	The Eternal Feminine	1969	
Bernard van Dieren	1		Chinese		1914	
Carl Ditters von Dittersdorf			Sinfonia nel gusto di cinque nazioni	Symphony in the style of five nations	1767	
Carl Ditters von Dittersdorf			Grande symphonie: Le carnaval ou La redoute	Grand Symphony: The carnival or The redoubt		
Carl Ditters von Dittersdorf		A minor	Il deliro delli compositori, ossia Il gusto d'oggidi	The delirium of the composers, namely The style of today		
Carl Ditters von Dittersdorf		A major	Nazionale nel gusto	National in taste		
Carl Ditters von Dittersdorf		D major	Il combattimento delle passioni umane	the fight of human passions		
Carl Ditters von Dittersdorf	1	C major	Die vier Weltalter	The Four Worlds		The first symphony by Dittersdorf that is based on Ovid's Metamorphoses (Kr. 73–84; Kr. 79–84 only exist in parts)
Carl Ditters von Dittersdorf	2	D major	Der Sturz Phaëtons	The Fall of Phaeton		The second symphony by Dittersdorf that is based on Ovid's Metamorphoses
Carl Ditters von Dittersdorf	3	G major	Verwandlung Actæons in einen Hirsch	The Metamorphosis of Acteon Into a Stag		The third symphony by Dittersdorf that is based on Ovid's Metamorphoses
Carl Ditters von Dittersdorf	4	F major	Die Rettung der Andromeda durch Perseus	The Rescue of Andromeda by Perseus		The fourth symphony by Dittersdorf that is based on Ovid's Metamorphoses
Carl Ditters von Dittersdorf	5	D major	Die Versteinerung des Phineus und seiner Freunde	The Petrification of Phineus and his Friend		The fifth symphony by Dittersdorf that is based on Ovid's Metamorphoses
Carl Ditters von Dittersdorf	6	A major	Verwandlung der lycischen Bauern in Frösche	The Transformation of the Lycian Peasants into Frogs		The sixth symphony by Dittersdorf that is based on Ovid's Metamorphoses
Felix Draeseke	3		Symphonia Tragica			
Felix Draeseke	4		Symphonia Comica			
Franco Donatoni			Souvenir		1967	
Franco Donatoni			Anton Webern		1983	
Cornelis Dopper	1		Diana		1895, revised 1921	
Cornelis Dopper	2		Scottish		1903	
Cornelis Dopper	3		Rembrandt		1892, rewritten 1904	dedicated to Rembrandt
Cornelis Dopper	5		Symphonia epica	Epic Symphony	1908	based on Homer's Iliad
Cornelis Dopper	6		Amsterdam		1912	
Cornelis Dopper	7		Zuiderzee		1917	
Vladimir Dovgan	4		Romantic		2001	
Tan Dun	1		Eroica		2009	A theme from Beethoven's Eroica symphony is borrowed
Antonín Dvořák	1		Zlonické zvony	The Bells of Zlonice		
Antonín Dvořák	9		Z nového světa	From the New World		A.k.a. New World Symphony; Previously listed as No. 8
Petr Eben	1		Simphonia Gregoriana	Gregorian Symphony	1954	For Organ and Orchestra
Hanns Eisler			Deutsche Sinfonie	German Symphony		
Halim El-Dabh			Symphonies in Sonic Vibration: Spectrum No. 1		1957	
Einar Englund	1			The War Symphony	1946	
Einar Englund	2		Amsel	Blackbird	1948	
Einar Englund	3		Barbarossa		1971	
Einar Englund	4			Nostalgic	1976	
Einar Englund	5		Sinfonia Fennica	Fennec Symphony	1977	
Einar Englund	6			Aphorisms	1984	For choir and orchestra
Maurice Emmanuel	2	A major	Bretonne	Breton	1930	prem. 1935
Arthur Farwell			Rudolf Gott		1934	Written based on the music by Rudolf Gott (who might have been a friend of Arthur Farwell)
John Fernström	11		Utan Mask		1945	
Josef Bohuslav Foerster	3	D major	Život	Life	1895	
Josef Bohuslav Foerster	4	C minor	Veliká noc	Easter Eve	1905	
Wolfgang Fortner	1		1947		1947	
Nils-Eric Fougstedt			Trittico sinfonico	Symphonic triptych	1958	The first Finnish dodecaphonic orchestral work (along with Paavo Heininen's first symphony written the same year)
Bohdana Frolyak	1		Orbis Terrarum	The world	1998	
Luca Fumagalli	1		Sinfonia Marinaresca	Marine Symphony	Before 1908	
Giovanni Gabrieli			Sacrae Symphoniae	Sacred Symphonies		1597 (motets for voices and instruments)
Giovanni Gabrieli			Symphoniae Sacrae II	Sacred Symphonies II		1615 (motets for voices and instruments)
Emmanuele Galea		B♭ major	Sinfonia Pastorale	Patorale Symphony	c. 1825	Rearranged and reorchestrated by Manuel Farrugia
José Maurício Nunes Garcia	1		Sinfonia Funebre	Funeral Symphony	1790	
José Maurício Nunes Garcia	2		Sinfonia Tempestade	Tempest Symphony		
Remus Georgescu			Simfonia Triade	Triad symphony	~2005?	
Robert Gerhard			Leo		1969	A Chamber Symphony
Robert Gerhard			Homenaje a Pedrell	Hommage to Pedrell	1941	Homage to Carlos Pedrell, who died that year
Robert Gerhard	2b		Metamorphosis		1967–68	This was a rewrite of Gerhard's symphony 2 under a different name, this rewrite was left incomplete.
Robert Gerhard	4		New York		1967	
Edward German	2		Norwich			
Friedrich Gernsheim	3	C minor	Mirjam		1887	
Vittorio Giannini			In memoriam Theodore Roosevelt		1935	
Vittorio Giannini			IBM Symphony		1937	Dedicated to IBM
Don Gillis	1		An American Symphony			
Don Gillis	2		Symphony of Faith			
Don Gillis	3		A Symphony for Free Men			
Don Gillis	5		In Memoriam			
Don Gillis	5½		A Symphony for Fun			
Don Gillis	6		The Pioneers			
Don Gillis	7		Saga of the Prairie School			
Don Gillis	8		A Dance Symphony			
Louis Glass	3	D major	Forest Symphony		1901	
Louis Glass	5	C major	Sinfonia Svastika	Swastika Symphony	1919	While the Swastika is often associated with the Nazis, at the time the symphony was written the Swastika was a common symbol of good luck, or even a religious symbol. By the time this symphony was written the Nazi Movement had not begun
Louis Glass	6		Skjoldungeæt	The Birth of Scyldings	1924	
Philip Glass	1		Low		1992	
Philip Glass	4		Heroes		1996	
Philip Glass	5		Requiem, Bardo, Nirmanakaya		1999	
Philip Glass	6		Plutonian Ode		2002	
Philip Glass	7		A Toltec Symphony		2005	
Philip Glass	12		Lodger		2019	
Philip Glass	14		Liechtenstein Suite		2020	
Alexander Glazunov	1	E major	Slavonian			
Alexander Glazunov	7	F major	Pastoral			
Evgeny Glebov	5			To the Peace		
Reinhold Glière	3		Ilya Muromets			
Felix Glonti	1		Romantic Symphony		1974	A revision of Glonti's first symphony (1961)
Felix Glonti	6		Vita nova	New Life	1974	Based on La Vita Nuova by Dante Alighieri.
Felix Glonti	7		Fiat lux	Let there be light	1981	See Let there be light
Felix Glonti	8		Symphonic Groups, Their Invariants and Representations		1982	
Felix Glonti	11		Mundus apertus	The World is open	1987	
Felix Glonti	12		Liturgical Symphony		1989	Based on David IV of Georgia
Radamés Gnattali	1-5		Sinfonia Popular	Popular Symphony		
Radamés Gnattali, Antônio Carlos Jobim, and Billy Blanco			Rio de Janeiro, a montanha, o sol, o mar	Rio de Janeiro, mountain, sun, sea	1954	A popular symphony in Samba beat.
Benjamin Godard			Symphonie Orientale	Oriental symphony		
Karl Goldmark			Ländliche Hochzeit	Rustic Wedding Symphony		literally "Rural Wedding"
Marin Goleminov	1			Children Symphony	1963	
Marin Goleminov	3			To Peace in the World	1970	
Marin Goleminov	4			Shopophonia	1978	
Evgeny Golubev	7	B minor	Heroic		1972	
Henryk Górecki	2		Kopernikowska	Copernican	1972	Op. 31
Henryk Górecki	3		Symfonia pieśni żałosnych	Symphony of Sorrowful Songs	1976	Op. 36
Ida Gotkovsky	1		Symphonie de Printemps	Spring Symphony	1973	
Ida Gotkovsky	2		Brilliante Symphonie	Brilliant Symphony	1988–89	
Ida Gotkovsky	3		Symphonie à la jeunesse	Youth Symphony	1993	
Louis Moreau Gottschalk	1		La Nuit des Tropiques	Night of the Tropics	1859	
Louis Moreau Gottschalk	2		À Montevide	To Montevideo	1868	
Morton Gould	2		Symphony on Marching Tunes		1944	
Morton Gould	4		West Point		1952	
Kurt Graunke	1	E major	Die Heimat	(The) Homeland	1969	
Alexander Gretchaninov	2	A major	Pastoral		1908	
Ferde Grofé	1		A Symphony in Steel		1936	
Ricard Lamote de Grignon			Simfonia Catalana	Catalan Symphony	1950	
Richard John Gualtieri			Symphony for John Dowland			Dedicated to John Dowland
Camargo Guarnieri	2		Uirapuru		1946	
Camargo Guarnieri	4		Brasília		1964	
César Guerra-Peixe	2		Brasília		1960	
Adalbert Gyrowetz	Op. 6 n. 2	E♭ major		Jupiter		Note that Opus 6 contains multiple symphonies, this is the 2nd in this opus.
Adalbert Gyrowetz	Op. 8	D major		Great		
Jacob Adolf Hägg	2	E♭ major		Nordic	1899	Op. 2
Jovdat Hajiyev	4			In Memory of Lenin		
Jovdat Hajiyev	5			Man, the Earth, the Glory	1984	
Johan Halvorsen	2	D minor	Fatum		1924, revised 1928	
Asger Hamerik	1	F major	Symphonie poétique	Poetic Symphony	1879–80	Technically Hamerik's second symphony as the 1860 symphony is lost.
Asger Hamerik	2	C minor	Symphonie tragique	Tragic Symphony	1882–83	
Asger Hamerik	3	E major	Symphonie lyrique	Lyrical Symphony	1883–84	
Asger Hamerik	4	C major	Symphonie majestueuse	Majestic Symphony	1884–89	
Asger Hamerik	5	G minor	Symphonie sérieuse	Serious Symphony	1889–91	
Asger Hamerik	6	G major	Symphonie spirituelle	Spiritiual Symphony	1897	
Asger Hamerik	7	D minor	Korsymfoni	Choral Symphony	1897, revised 1901–06	For mixed choir, mezzo-soprano, and orchestra; also called Chor-Symphonie
Howard Hanson	1		Nordic			
Howard Hanson	2		Romantic			
Howard Hanson	4		Requiem			
Howard Hanson	5		Sinfonia sacra			
Howard Hanson	7		Sea			
Roy Harris	1		Symphony 1933			
Roy Harris	4		Folksong			
Roy Harris	6		Gettysburg			
Roy Harris	8		San Francisco			
Lou Harrison			Symphony on G			The word "on" is a deliberate part of the composer's title
Emil Hartmann	5	A minor	Fra Riddertiden	From Knights' time	1887	Published as Symphony No. 2 at the time
Karl Amadeus Hartmann	1		Miserae			later retitled simply as 'symphonic poem'
Karl Amadeus Hartmann	1		Versuch eines Requiem			
Karl Amadeus Hartmann	5		Symphonie concertante			
Hamilton Harty	1		An Irish Symphony		1904, rev. 1914, 1924	
Siegmund von Hausegger			Natursymphonie	Nature Symphony	1911	With chorus at the end based on Johann Wolfgang von Goethe's Proömium
Hanna Havrylets	2		In Memoriam		1995	
Joseph Haydn	6	D major	Le matin	Morning	1761	see also List of symphonies by Joseph Haydn
Joseph Haydn	7	C major	Le midi	Noon	1761	
Joseph Haydn	8	G major	Le soir	Evening	1761	
Joseph Haydn	22	E♭ major	Der Philosoph	Philosopher	1764	
Joseph Haydn	26	D minor	Lamentatione		1768 (maybe 1769)	
Joseph Haydn	30	C major	Alleluja	Alleluia	1765	
Joseph Haydn	31	D major	Hornsignal	Hornsignal	1765	
Joseph Haydn	38	C major		Echo	c. 1768	
Joseph Haydn	43	E♭ major	Merkur	Mercury	1770–1771	
Joseph Haydn	44	E minor	Trauer	Mourning	1770–1771	
Joseph Haydn	45	F♯ minor	Abschiedssinfonie	Farewell	1772	
Joseph Haydn	47	G major		The Palindrome	1772	
Joseph Haydn	48	C major	Maria Theresia		1769	
Joseph Haydn	49	F minor	La Passione		1768	
Joseph Haydn	53	D major	L'Impériale		1778–1779	
Joseph Haydn	55	E♭ major	Der Schulmeister	The Schoolmaster	1774	
Joseph Haydn	59	A major	Feuer		1768	
Joseph Haydn	60	C major	Il distratto		1774	
Joseph Haydn	63	C major	La Roxelane		1779	
Joseph Haydn	64	A major	Tempora mutantur		1773	
Joseph Haydn	69	C major	Laudon		c. 1774–1775	
Joseph Haydn	73	D major	La Chasse		c. 1781	
Joseph Haydn	82	C major	L'Ours	The Bear	1786(?)	
Joseph Haydn	83	G minor	La Poule	The Hen	1785	
Joseph Haydn	84	E♭ major	In nomine Domini		1786	
Joseph Haydn	85	B♭ major	La Reine	The Queen	1785(?)	
Joseph Haydn	92	G major	Oxford		1789	premiered 1789
Joseph Haydn	94	G major	Mit dem Paukenschlag	The Surprise	1791	premiered 1791
Joseph Haydn	96	D major	Le Miracle	The Miracle	1791	premiered 1791
Joseph Haydn	100	G major	Militär	Military	1794	premiered 1794
Joseph Haydn	101	D major	Die Uhr	The Clock	1794	premiered 1794
Joseph Haydn	103	E♭ major	Mit dem Paukenwirbel	Drumroll	1795	Premiered 1795
Joseph Haydn	104	D major	London		1795	a.k.a. Salomon. Premiered 1795
Joseph Haydn	107	B♭ major	Sinfonie A	A	1760–1761	
Joseph Haydn	108	B♭ major	Sinfonie B	B	1762	
Paavo Heininen	2		Petite symphonie joyeuse	A small joyous symphony	1962	
Heinrich von Herzogenberg		D minor	Odysseus		1872	
Alfred Hill	1		Maori			
Alfred Hill	2		Joy of Life		1941	
Alfred Hill	3		Australia			
Alfred Hill	4		The pursuit of happiness			
Alfred Hill	5		Carnival			
Alfred Hill	6		Celtic			
Alfred Hill	8		The Mind of Man			
Alfred Hill	9		Melodious			
Alfred Hill	10		Short symphony			
Alfred Hill	11		The Four Nations		1950s	
Mirrie Hill			Arnhem Land		1954	
Paul Hindemith			Mathis der Maler	The painter Matthias		a reference to Matthias Grünewald see also Mathis der Maler (opera)
Paul Hindemith			Pittsburgh Symphony			
Paul Hindemith			Symphonia Serena		1946	
Alun Hoddinott	9		Vision of Eternity		1992	For soprano and orchestra
Heinrich Hofmann			Frithjof		1874	
Joseph Holbrooke			Les Hommages	The Homages	1900, revised 1904	Originally intended to be a symphonic suite, first movement is homage to Edvard Grieg, second movement to Antonín Dvořák, and the final moment to Tchiakovsky
Joseph Holbrooke	1		Homage to E. A. Poe			Homage to Edgar Allan Poe
Joseph Holbrooke	2		Apollo and the Seaman			
Joseph Holbrooke	3	E minor	Ships		1925	Also called "Nelson Symphony", or "Our Navy".
Joseph Holbrooke	4	B minor	Homage to Schubert		1928, revised 1933, then 1943	Also called "The Little One".
Joseph Holbrooke	5	E♭ minor	Wild Wales			
Joseph Holbrooke	6	G major	Old England			
Joseph Holbrooke	7	D major	Al Aaraaf		1929	Arrangement of Holbrooke's String Sextet ("Henry Vaughan") in D major (1902)
Joseph Holbrooke	8	B♭	Dance Symphony			
Joseph Holbrooke	9		Milton			
Vagn Holmboe	3		Sinfonia rustica			
Vagn Holmboe	4		Sinfonia sacra			
Vagn Holmboe	8		Sinfonia boreale			
Arthur Honegger	3		Symphonie Liturgique			
Arthur Honegger	4		Deliciae basiliensis			
Arthur Honegger	5		Di tre re			
Gustav Holst			The Cotswolds		1900	
Joseph Horovitz			Jubilee Toy Symphony		1977	For the Silver Jubilee of Elizabeth II. See Toy Symphony (section "Other Toy Symphonies") for more information.
Izaäk Albertus Houck	2	C major	De vier leeftijden	The Four Seasons	Before 1890	Op. 44
Alan Hovhaness	1		Exile			
Alan Hovhaness	2		Mysterious Mountain			
Alan Hovhaness	6		Celestial Gate			
Alan Hovhaness	7		Nanga Parvat			
Alan Hovhaness	8		Arjuna			
Alan Hovhaness	9		Saint Vartan			
Alan Hovhaness	10		Vahaken			
Alan Hovhaness	11		All Men are Brothers			
Alan Hovhaness	12		Choral			
Alan Hovhaness	13		Ardent Song			re-arrangement of music composed for the Martha Graham ballet Ardent Song
Alan Hovhaness	14		Ararat			
Alan Hovhaness	15		Silver Pilgrimage			
Alan Hovhaness	16		Kayagum			
Alan Hovhaness	17		Symphony for Metal Orchestra			
Alan Hovhaness	18		Circe			re-arrangement of music composed for the 1963 Martha Graham ballet Circe
Alan Hovhaness	19		Vishnu			
Alan Hovhaness	20		Three Journeys to a Holy Mountain			
Alan Hovhaness	21		Etchmiadzin			
Alan Hovhaness	22		City of Light			
Alan Hovhaness	23		Ani			
Alan Hovhaness	24		Majnun			
Alan Hovhaness	25		Odysseus			
Alan Hovhaness	32		The Broken Wings			
Alan Hovhaness	46		To the Green Mountains			
Alan Hovhaness	47		Walla Walla, Land of Many Waters			
Alan Hovhaness	48		Vision of Andromeda			
Alan Hovhaness	49		Christmas Symphony			
Alan Hovhaness	50		Mount St. Helens			
Alan Hovhaness	52		Journey to Vega			
Alan Hovhaness	53		Star Dawn			
Alan Hovhaness	57		Cold Mountain			
Alan Hovhaness	58		Symphony Sacra			
Alan Hovhaness	60		To the Appalachian Mountains			
Alan Hovhaness	62		Oh Let Man Not Forget These Words Divine			
Alan Hovhaness	63		Loon Lake			
Alan Hovhaness	64		Agiochook			
Alan Hovhaness	65		Artstakh			
Alan Hovhaness	66		Hymn to Glacier Peak			
Alan Hovhaness	67		Hymn to the Mountains			
Alan Hovhaness			Mountains and Rivers Without End		1968	Chamber Symphony for 10 Players
Georges Hugon	2		La Genèse d'Or	The Golden Genesis		
Georges Hugon	3		Promotheus		Unfinished	
Jeno Hubay	2		Háborús-szimfónia	War-Symphony	1914	Revised in 1922, op. 93
Jeno Hubay			Petőfi		1922	Based on words by Sándor Petőfi, op. 119
Bertold Hummel	2		Reverenza			
Bertold Hummel	3		Jeremiah			
Victor Hely-Hutchinson			Carol Symphony		1927	Choral work, based on 5 Christmas songs
Akira Ifukube			Ballet symphonique après Etenraku	Symphonic ballet after Etenraku	1940	Based on the melody of Etenraku
Akira Ifukube			Ballata Sinfonica	Ballad Symphony	1943	
Akira Ifukube			Arctic Forest		1944	
Akira Ifukube			Sinfonia Tapkaara	Tapkaara Symphony	1954, revised 1979	
Vincent d'Indy	1		Italienne	Italian		never published
Vincent d'Indy	3		Sinfonia brevis de bello Gallico	Brief sinfonia of the war in Gaul		
Vincent d'Indy			Symphonie sur un chant montagnard français a.k.a.Symphonie Cévenole	Symphony on a French Mountain Air ("Cévennes Symphony")		
Konstatin Ivanov	1	F♯ minor	Космическая симфония	Space Symphony	1975	In memory of Yuri Gagarin
Jānis Ivanovs	4		Atlantīda	Atlantic	1941	
Jānis Ivanovs	6		Latgales	Latgalian	1949	
Jānis Ivanovs	12		Sinfonia energica		1967	
Jānis Ivanovs	13		Symphonia humana		1969	
Jānis Ivanovs	14		Sinfonia da caméra		1971	
Jānis Ivanovs	15		Sinfonia Ipsa		1972	
Charles Ives	3		The Camp Meeting			
Charles Ives			New England Holidays			a.k.a. Holidays Symphony
Charles Ives			Universe Symphony			
Werner Jaegerhuber	1		L'île enchantée	The Enchanted Island		
Zhu Jian'er	3		西藏	Tibet	1988	
Zhu Jian'er	4		6.4.2-1		1990	
Zhu Jian'er	6		3Y		1992-94	
Zhu Jian'er	7		天籁、地籁、人籁	Sounds of Paradise, Earth & Mankind	1994	
Zhu Jian'er	8		求索	Seeking	1994	
Zhu Jian'er	10		江雪	River Snow	1997-98	Based on the poem by Liu Zongyuan
James Price Johnson			Harlem Symphony		1932	
Robert Sherlaw Johnson	1		Northumbrian Symphony		1999	Uses the Northumbrian pipes
Miloslav Kabeláč	5	B♭ minor	Drammatica	Dramatic	1960	For textless soprano and orchestra
Miloslav Kabeláč	8		Antiphonies		1970	
Pierre Kaelin			Symphonie des deux mondes	Symphony of the Two Worlds		on a text by Helder Camara
Viktor Kalabis	2		Sinfonia Pacis	Symphony of Peace	1961-62	
Viktor Kalabis	5		Fragment		1975-76	
Mykhalio Kalachevsky		A minor	Ukrainskaya simfoniya	(The) Ukrainian Symphony	1876	
Imants Kalniņš	4		Rock Symphony		1972, revised 1973, then 1998	The last movement was originally in the symphony, however was cut out, it only returned back in the 1998 revision.
Giya Kancheli	2		Chants		1970	
Giya Kancheli	4		In memoria di Michelangelo	In memory of Michelangelo	1974–75	
Giya Kancheli	7		Epilogue		1986	
Artur Kapp	4			Youth Symphony	1948	
Eugen Kapp	1	C minor	Patriootiline	Patriotic	1942–43	
Eugen Kapp	2	G minor	Eesti sümfoonia	Estonian Symphony	1953–54	
Eugen Kapp	3	F major	Kevadine	Spring	1963–64	
Alemdar Karamanov	4			May	1956	
Alemdar Karamanov	7		Lunnoe more	Moon Night	1958	
Alemdar Karamanov	11–14		Sovershishasja	Accomplished	1965–66	Symphony cycle
Alemdar Karamanov	15–16		In Amorem Et Vivificantem	In Love and Giving Life	1974	The symphonies are meant to be together
Alemdar Karamanov	17		America		1974	
Alemdar Karamanov	18–23		Byst	Was	1976–1980	Symphony cycle (Note: The symphonies have their own name, the collection of them is called Was (or Byst however that can also refer to symphony 22). Symphony 18, Lubjashchu ny (To He Who loves us); Symphony 19, Kroviju Agncheju (Blood of the Lamb); Symphony 20, Blazhennii mertvii (Blessed are the Death); Symphony 21, Grad Velij (The Great City); Symphony 22, Byst (Let it Be); Symphony 23, Az Iisus (I am Jesus))
Alemdar Karamanov	24		Adzhimushkaj		1983	Adzhimushkaj is a World War II battle site, and is also the name of a minor planet
Dezider Kardoš	2		O rodnej zemi	On Native Health	1955	
Dezider Kardoš	4		Piccola	Small	1962	
Rudolf Karel	3		Sinfonie Démon	Demon symphony	1918–20	
Rudolf Karel	4		Symphonie renaissance	Renaissance symphony	1921	
Rudolf Karel	5			Spring symphony	1938	
Mieczysław Karłowicz		E minor	Rebirth			Op. 7
Tolga Kashif			The Queen Symphony			based on the music of the pop group Queen
Elena Kats-Chernin			Symphonia Eluvium	Eluvium Symphony	2011	
Bernhard Kaun	1		Romantic Symphony		1969	
Hugo Kaun	1	D minor	An mein Vaterland. Dem Andenken meines Vaters	To my fatherland. My father's memory	1895	The score is published by Breitkopf & Härtel since 1898.
Hershy Kay			Western Symphony		1954	This work is a ballet, Kay arranged some American Folk Tunes and worked with choreographer George Balanchine.
Donald Keats	2		Elegiac Symphony		1960–62	See: Elegy
Edgar Stillman Kelley	1	F	Gulliver		1914–35	
Edgar Stillman Kelley	2	B♭	New England		1913, rev. 1922	
Robert Kelly	1	A	Miniature Symphony		1950	
Robert Kelly	3		Emancipation		1961	For band
Aaron Jay Kernis	1		Symphony in Waves		1989	
Hidayat Inayat Khan			Message Symphony		1972	The composer said the symphony "message" is "Love, Harmony and Beauty"; Op. 30
Jack Frederick Kilpatrick	7		The Republic of Texas		1957	Kilpatrick is from the Cherokee Nation
Jack Frederick Kilpatrick	8		Oklahoma		1957	For dancers, narrator, and orchestra
Byong-Kon Kim	2		Symphony of Three Metaphors		1983	
Byong-Kon Kim	3		Festival Symphony		1984	
Oliver King	1	F major	Night		1880	
Theron Wilford Kirk	2		Saga of the Plains			
Koichi Kishi		E♭ minor	Buddha			
Dmitri Klebanov	1		Бабий яр	In Memoriam to the Martyrs of Babi Yar	1945	Banned by the Soviet Government
Dmitri Klebanov	8			Poeme about Bread	1983	
Yves Klein	1		Monotone-Silence Symphony		1949	One chord is played continuously for 20 minutes, and then silence follows for another 20 minutes.
Paul von Klenau	4		Dante-Symphonie	Dante Symphony	1913	
Paul von Klenau	5		Triptikon		1939	
Paul von Klenau	6		Nordische Symphonie	Nordic Symphony	1940	
Paul von Klenau	7		Die Sturmsymphonie	The Storm Symphony	1941	
Paul von Klenau	8		Im Alten Stil	In Old-Style	1942	
August Klughardt			Waldleben	Life in the forest	1871	withdrawn
August Klughardt	1		Lenore		1873	
Ernst Gernot Klussmann	6		Rodope or Rhodope		1964	Op. 39
Erland von Koch	2		Sinfonia dalecarlia	Dalecarlian Symphony	1945	
Erland von Koch	4		Sinfonia Seria	Serious Symphony	1952–53, revised 1963	
Erland von Koch	5		Lapponica		1977	
Erland von Koch	6		Salvare la terra	Salvage the Earth	1992	
Charles Koechlin			Seven Stars Symphony			
Lev Kolodub	2		Shevchenko's images		1964	A Symphony-Duma
Lev Kolodub	3		Symphony in the style of the Ukrainian Baroque		1980	
Lev Kolodub	4		86		1986	
Lev Kolodub	5		Pro memoria		1990	In memory of those who died in Ukrainian disasters
Lev Kolodub	6	C major and A	C major and A. Schoenberg		1999	Dedicated to Arnold Schoenberg
Lev Kolodub	7		Metamorphoses		2000, revised 2003	
Lev Kolodub	8		Pryluky		2003	Written for youth orchestra. Dedicated after Pryluky
Lev Kolodub	9		New Feelings		2004	
Lev Kolodub	10		According to sketches of young years		2005	
Lev Kolodub	11		New Shores		2007	
Lev Kolodub	12		Zeitheist			Also called The spirit of time
Thomas Koppel			Symfoni for gadens børn	Symphony for children in the streets		
Nikolai Korndorf	4		Underground Music		1996	See Underground music
Meyer Kupferman			Icon			
Franz Lachner	5	C minor	Passionata	Passionate	1835	Also known as the "Prize Symphony" for winning an 1835 competition. Heavily criticized by Robert Schumann.
Ignaz Lachner			Toy Symphony			See Toy Symphony (section "Other Toy Symphonies") for more information.
László Lajtha	4	D major	Le Printemps	The Spring	1951	Op. 52
László Lajtha	7		Révolution	Revolution	1957	Also called the Autumn
Édouard Lalo			Symphonie espagnole	Spanish Symphony		for violin and orchestra
Serge Lancen			Manhattan Symphonie	Manhattan Symphony	1962	For wind orchestra
Serge Lancen			Symphonie de Noël	Symphony of Christmas	1964	For wind orchestra
Serge Lancen			Mini Symphonie	Mini Symphony	1967	For wind orchestra
Serge Lancen			Symphonie de Paris	Paris Symphony	1975	For wind orchestra
Serge Lancen			Symphonie de l'Eau	Water Symphony	1986	For wind orchestra
Serge Lancen			Symphonie Ibérique	Iberian Symphony	1991	For wind orchestra
Serge Lancen			Symphonie Joyeuse	Joyous Symphony	1993	For wind orchestra
Serge Lancen			Zwiefache Symphonie	Double Symphony	1993	For wind orchestra
Marcel Landowski	1		Jean de la Peur	Jean the Feared	1949	
Marcel Landowski	3		Des Espaces	Spaces	1964	
Marcel Landowski	5		Les Lumieres de la Nuit	The Lights of the Night	1998	
Peter Lange-Müller	1	D minor	Efterår	Autumn		Op. 17
Rued Langgaard	1		Klippepastoraler	Cliffside Pastorals	1908–09, revised 1910–11	
Rued Langgaard	2		Vårbrud	Awakening of Spring	1912–14, revised (as version 2) 1926–33	
Rued Langgaard	3		Ungdomsbrus	The Flush of Youth	1915–16, revised 1925–33	
Rued Langgaard	4		Løvfald	Leaf-fall	1916–20	
Rued Langgaard	5		Steppenatur	Nature of the Steppe	1917–18, revised 1920–1931	The name only applies for the revised version
Rued Langgaard	6		Det Himmelrivende	The Stormy Sky	1919–20, revised 1928–30	
Rued Langgaard	7		Ved Tordenskjold i Holmens Kirke	author=Tordenskjold in Holmen Church	1925–26, revised 1930–32	The name only applies to the revised version
Rued Langgaard	8		Minder ved Amalienborg	Memories at Amalienborg	1926–28, revised 1929–34	
Rued Langgaard	9		Fra Dronning Dagmars By	From Queen Dagmar's City	1942	
Rued Langgaard	10		Hin Tordenbolig	Yon Hall of Thunder	1944–45	
Rued Langgaard	11		Ixion		1944–45	
Rued Langgaard	12		Helsingeborg		1946	
Rued Langgaard	13		Undertro	Belief in Wonders	1946–47	
Rued Langgaard	14		Morgenen	Morning	1947–48, revised 1951	
Rued Langgaard	15		Søstormen	Storm at Sea	1937–49	
Rued Langgaard	16		Syndflod af Sol	Deluge of the Sun	1951	
Rued Langgaard			Sfærernes Musik	Music of the Spheres	1916–18	
Claude Lapham			Symphonie Japonaise	Japanese Symphony	1934	First American symphony to include a Shakuhachi
Aleksander Lasoń	3		1999		1996–97	"Apokalypsis" for choir and orchestra
Dieter Lehnhoff	1		Sinfonia poetica	Poetic Symphony	1975	
Dieter Lehnhoff	2		Sinfonia festiva	Festive Symphony	1990	
Dieter Lehnhoff	3		Sinfonia Caribe	Caribe Symphony	2014	Drawn from the opera "Caribe"
Jón Leifs	1		Sögusinfónía	Saga Symphony	1941–42	
Jeanne Leleu			Transparences		1931	
Jean-Yves Daniel Lesur	1		Symphonie de danses	Symphony of dances	1958	
Jean-Yves Daniel Lesur	2		d'ombre et de lumière	shadow and light	1974	
Sheng Lihong	1		Ocean Symphony			
Malcolm Lipkin	1		Sinfonia di Roma	Roman Symphony	1958–65	
Malcolm Lipkin	2		The Pursuit		1975–79	
Malcolm Lipkin	3		Sun		1979–86	
Franz Liszt				Dante Symphony		full name: A symphony to Dante's Divina Commedia
Franz Liszt			Eine Faust-Symphonie	Faust Symphony		
George Lloyd	10		November Journeys		1981	
Oscar Lorenzo Fernandez	2		O Caçador de Esmeraldas	The Emerald Hunter	1947	
Borys Lyatoshynsky	1	B minor	Мир переможе війну	Peace will Defeat War	1951, rev 1954	Name removed in the revision by political pressures
Borys Lyatoshynsky	5	C major	Слов'янська	Slavonic	1965-66	
Aleksi Machavariani	4		Youthful		1983	
Aleksi Machavariani	5		Ushba		1986	
Aleksi Machavariani	6		Amirani-Prometheus		1987	
Aleksi Machavariani	7		Gelati		1989	For choir and orchestra, with texts based on the stories of King David
Tod Machover			Toy Symphony		2002–03	Uses Machover's Hyperviolin. See Toy Symphony (section "Other Toy Symphonies") for more information.
Tod Machover	1		A Toronto Symphony		2013	For orchestra and electronic
Tod Machover	2		A Symphony for Our Times		2015	Written for the closing performance of the World Economic Forum 2015 meeting.
Gustav Mahler	1	D major	Der Titan	Titan	1884–88, rev 1892	Initially conceived as a symphonic poem
Gustav Mahler	2	C minor	Auferstehung	Resurrection	1888-94	
Gustav Mahler	6	A minor	Tragische	Tragic	1903-04	
Gustav Mahler	7		Lied der Nacht	Song of the Night	1904-05	
Gustav Mahler	8	E♭ major	Sinfonie der Tausend	Symphony of a Thousand	1906	Mahler disapproved of the name
Gustav Mahler			Das Lied von der Erde	The Song of the Earth	1908	a symphony in the guise of a song cycle. see Curse of the ninth
Gyula Major	2		Symphonie hongroise	Hungarian Symphony	pub. 1900	
Gyula Major	6		Scenen aus dem Weltkrieg	Scenes from the world war	1915–16	
Jan Adam Maklakiewicz	2		Święty Boże	The Holy Lord	1927	
Irina Manukian	2		Ecce Homo			
Irina Manukian	3		Thirty-two Variations On Descending Bass			
John Marsh	10	E♭ major	A Conversation Symphony		1778	Part of the "Salisbury Symphonies"
John Marsh	24	E♭ major	La Chasse	The Chase	1790	Symphony No. 7 of the "Chinchester Symphonies"
Jean Martinon	1		Voyages	Voyage	1956	Unpublished
Jean Martinon	2		Hymne a la Vie	Hymn to Life	1944	Unpublished, Op. 37
Jean Martinon	3		Irlandaise	Irish	1948	Op. 45
Jean Martinon	4			Altitudes	1965	Op.53; There are 3 versions of the symphony, the "Originaux" (Original), the Corrections, and the New coda final, all three revisions were from the same year.
Bohuslav Martinů	6		Fantaisies Symphoniques	Symphonic Fantasies	1951-53	
Joseph Marx			Eine Herbstsymphonie	Autumn Symphony	1921	
Joseph Marx			Eine symphonische Nachtmusik	Symphonic Night music	1922	
John McCabe			Six-minute Symphony			
John Blackwood McEwen	5	C♯ minor	Solway		1911	
Johan de Meij	1		The Lord of the Rings			
Johan de Meij	2		The Big Apple – A New York Symphony			
Johan de Meij	3		Planet Earth			
Erkki Melartin	4		Kesäsinfonia	Summer Symphony		
Erkki Melartin	5		Sinfonia brevis	Short Symphony		
Erkki Melartin	7		Sinfonia gaia	Joyous Symphony		unfinished
Felix Mendelssohn	2		Lobgesang	Hymn of Praise		
Felix Mendelssohn	3		Schottische	Scottish		
Felix Mendelssohn	4		Italienische	Italian		
Felix Mendelssohn	5		Reformation			
Felix Mendelssohn			Kindersymphonien	Toy Symphony	3 total, 1st 1827, 2nd 1828, the 3rd is unknown.	Now lost. See Toy Symphony (section Other Toy Symphonies) for more information.
Flô Menezes			Sinfonias	Symphonies	1997–1998	8-channel electronic work using snippets from hundreds of symphonies in the classical repertoire
Peter Mennin	4		The Cycle		1947-48	
Peter Mennin	7		Variation-Symphony		1964	
Louis Mennini	2		Da Festa	The Festive	1963	
Gian Carlo Menotti	1		Halcyon		1976	
Aarre Merikanto	2		War		1918	
Olivier Messiaen			Turangalîla-Symphonie	Turangalîla Symphony	1946–1948	Premiered 1949. Revised 1990.
Krzysztof Meyer	2		Epitaphium Stanisław Wiechowicz	Epitaph for Stanisław Wiechowicz	1967	Dedicated to Stanisław Wiechowicz
Krzysztof Meyer	3		Symphonie d'Orphée	Symphony of Orpheus	1986	
Krzysztof Meyer		D major	in Mozartean style		1976–77	
Krzysztof Meyer	6		Polish		1982	
Krzysztof Meyer	7		Sinfonia del tempo che passa	Symphony of passing time	2002–2003	
Krzysztof Meyer	8		Sinfonia da requiem	Requiem Symphony	2009	
Krzysztof Meyer	9		Fidae speique	Faithful and Hopeful	2016	
Francisco Mignone			Sinfonia do Trabalho	Labour Symphony	1939	
Francisco Mignone			Sinfonia tropical	Tropical Symphony	1958	
Francisco Mignone			Sinfonia transamazônica	Transamazonic Symphony	1972	
Darius Milhaud			Le printemps	Spring	1917	Little Symphony No. 1
Darius Milhaud			Pastorale		1918	Little Symphony No. 2
Darius Milhaud			Sérénade	Serenade	1921	Little Symphony No. 3
Darius Milhaud			Dixtuor pour instruments à cordes	Decet for string instruments	1921	Little Symphony No. 4
Darius Milhaud			Dixtuor pour instruments à vents	Decet for wind instruments	1922	Little Symphony No. 5
Darius Milhaud	3		Te Deum		1946	
Darius Milhaud	8		Rhôdanienne	Rhone Symphony	1957	
Darius Milhaud	11		Romantique	Romantic Symphony	1960	
Darius Milhaud	12		La Rurale	Rural Symphony	1961	
Darius Milhaud			Pacem in terris	Peace on Earth	1963	Choral symphony, with text by Pope John XXIII
Darius Milhaud			Symphonie pour l'univers claudélien	Symphony for the Claudelian Universe	1968	Dedicated to Paul Claudel
Richard Mohaupt	1		Rhythm and Variations		1939–1940	premiered 1942
Stephen Montague			Toy Symphony		1999	For chamber orchestra. See Toy Symphony (section "Other Toy Symphonies") for more information.
Emánuel Moór	2	C major	In Memoriam to Ludwig Kossuth		1894	Ludwig Kossuth is most likely Lajos Kossuth. Premiered on November 1, 1894, by the London Symphony Orchestra.
Wolfgang Amadeus Mozart		A minor		Odense Symphony		K. Anh 220 (16a) – spurious
Wolfgang Amadeus Mozart		G major		Old Lambach Symphony	1766(?)	45a
Wolfgang Amadeus Mozart	25	G minor		Little G minor		see also List of compositions by Wolfgang Amadeus Mozart#Symphonies
Wolfgang Amadeus Mozart	31			Paris		
Wolfgang Amadeus Mozart	32			Overture in the Italian style		
Wolfgang Amadeus Mozart	35		Haffner			
Wolfgang Amadeus Mozart	36		Linz			
Wolfgang Amadeus Mozart	38			Prague		
Wolfgang Amadeus Mozart	40	G minor		Great G minor		Also: The Fortieth (number as nickname)
Wolfgang Amadeus Mozart	41		Jupiter			
Gottfried Müller			Symphony "Dürer"			Dedicated to Albrecht Dürer
Karl-Franz Muller	1		Symphony des Machines	Symphony of the Machines	1959	
Karl-Franz Muller	2		Arcadian Symphony		1970–72	
Karl-Franz Muller	3		Altische Symphonie	Old Symphony		
Karl-Franz Muller	4		Sardinian Symphony			
Karl-Franz Muller	5		Sarda Symphony			
Karl-Franz Muller	6–9		Sinfonia Breve	Short Symphony	1960s	He wrote 3 of these symphonies. The 2nd was written in 1963.
Karl-Franz Muller	10		Sinfonia imitanda	Imitative Symphony	1957	
Karl-Franz Muller	11–15		Sinfonia Mazedonia	Macedonian Symphony	1963–87	He wrote 4 of these symphonies
Karl-Franz Muller	16–17		Preclassical Symphony			He wrote 2 of these symphonies
Karl-Franz Muller	19		Thelassian Symphony			
Askold Murov			Тобольская	Tobolsk	1971	
Askold Murov	4		Стереофония	Stereophonia	1974	
Nikolai Myaskovsky	6	E♭ minor	Революционная	Revolutionary	1921-23	Popularly nicknamed due to its use of the French revolutionary songs Ah! ça ira and Carmagnole, more used in the West than in Russia.
Nikolai Myaskovsky	12	G minor	Колхозная	Collective Farm	1931-32	Conceived as a programmatic symphony, the composer later disowned the title, which is still being widely used.
Nikolai Myaskovsky	16	F major	Авиационная	Aviation	1933-34	Inspired by the crash of the plane Tupolev ANT-20 "Maxim Gorky". The finale also quotes a song written by Myaskovsky: "The Aeroplanes are Flying".
Nikolai Myaskovsky	21	F♯ minor	Симфония-Фантазия	Symphony-Fantasy	1940	
Nikolai Myaskovsky	22	B minor	Симфония-баллада	Symphony-Ballad	1941	Conceived as a programmatic symphony with a further subtitle: "On the Great Patriotic War". All of these were removed before publication in 1944.
Nikolai Myaskovsky	23	A minor	Cимфония-сюита	Symphony-Suite	1941	Also known as "Symphony-Suite on Kabardanian Folk Themes"
Richard Nanes	1	B♭ major	Atlantis – The Sunken City			
Richard Nanes	2	B major	The False Benediction			
Richard Nanes	3		The Holocaust			
Richard Nanes	4		The Eternal Conflict			
Sulkhan Nassidse	4		Colchian		1975	
Sulkhan Nassidse	5		Pirosmani		1978	
Sulkhan Nassidse	6		Passion		1979	
Sulkhan Nassidse	7		Dalai		1979	
Sulkhan Nassidse	8		Fresco		1981	
Sulkhan Nassidse	11		Liturgical		1991	
Carl Nielsen	2		De fire Temperamenter	The Four Temperaments		
Carl Nielsen	3		Sinfonia Espansiva	Expansive Symphony		
Carl Nielsen	4		Det Uudslukkelige	The Inextinguishable		
Carl Nielsen	6		Sinfonia Semplice	Simple Symphony		
Kai Nieminen	1		La Selva	The Jungle	prem. 2013	Commissioned by the Sinfonia Finlandia Jyväskylä
Kai Nieminen	2		Nello specchio della notte	In the mirror of the night	prem. 2015	
Serge Nigg	1		Jérôme Bosch	Hieronymus Bosch	1960	See: Hieronymus Bosch
Per Nørgård	1		Sinfonia austera	Austere Symphony	1953–55	
Per Nørgård	4		Indischer Roosen-Gaarten und Chinesischer Hexensee	Indian Rose Garden and Chinese Witch's Lake	1981	
Per Nørgård	6		Når alt kommer til alt	At the End of the Day	1999	
Ib Nørholm	2			Isola Bella		
Ib Nørholm	3			Day's Nightmare	1973	
Ib Nørholm	4			Decreation		
Ib Nørholm	5			The Elements		
Ib Nørholm	6		Moraliteter	Moralities	1987?	
Ib Nørholm	7			Ecliptic Instincts		
Ib Nørholm	8			Faith and Longing		
Ib Nørholm	9			The Sun Garden in Three Shades of Light		
Ib Nørholm	13		Contrappunto con Amore	Counterpoint with Love	2013	
Zygmunt Noskowski	2	C minor	Elegiac		1875–79	
Zygmunt Noskowski	3	F major	From Spring to Spring		1903	
Feliks Nowowiejski	3		Bialowieska		1940	
Gösta Nystroem	1		Sinfonia breve	Short Symphony	1929–31	
Gösta Nystroem	2		Sinfonia Espressiva	Expressive Symphony	1932–35 revised 1937	
Gösta Nystroem	3		Sinfonia del Mare	Symphony of the Sea	1946–48	After Ebba Lindqvist
Gösta Nystroem	4		Sinfonia Shakespeariana	Shakespearian Symphony	1952	Dedicated to William Shakespeare, (see -ana#In music)
Gösta Nystroem	5		Sinfonia Seria	Serious Symphony	1962–63	
Gösta Nystroem			Sinfonia di Lotano	Symphony from Distance	1963	
Gösta Nystroem	6		Sinfonia Tramontana		1965	
Hisato Ohzawa	3	D major	『建国の交響楽』	Symphony of the Founding of Japan	1937	Written for the 2600th anniversary on the founding of Japan
Hisatada Otaka	1		Society for the Construction of the Bell Tower of Peace		1948–1949	The symphony is either incomplete or partially lost
Vyacheslav Ovchinnikov	2		Yuri Gagarin		1956	Dedicated to astronaut Yuri Gagarin
Ignacy Jan Paderewski	1	B minor	Polonia		1903–08	
John Knowles Paine	2	A major	Im Frühling	In Spring	1879	
Andrzej Panufnik	1		Sinfonia rustica			
Andrzej Panufnik	2		Sinfonia elegiaca	Elegiac Symphony		
Andrzej Panufnik	3		Sinfonia sacra	Sacred Symphony		
Andrzej Panufnik	4		Sinfonia concertante	Concertant Symphony		
Andrzej Panufnik	5		Sinfonia di sfere	Symphony of the Spheres		
Andrzej Panufnik	6		Sinfonia mistica	Mystic Symphony		
Andrzej Panufnik	7		Metasinfonia	Metasymphony		
Andrzej Panufnik	8		Sinfonia votiva	Votive Symphony		
Andrzej Panufnik	9		Sinfonia di speranza	Symphony of Hope		
Paul Paray			Symphonie d'archets	Symphony of Bows	1919	Orchestration of his String Quartet in E-minor
Paul Paray	2	A minor	Le Tréport		1936–39	See: Le Tréport
Hubert Parry	2		Cambridge			
Hubert Parry	3		English			
Hubert Parry	5		Symphonic fantasia			
Arvo Pärt	1		Polyphonic			
Arvo Pärt	4		Los Angeles			
Alla Pavlova	1			Farewell, Russia	1994	
Alla Pavlova	2			For the New Millennium	1998	
Alla Pavlova	6			Vincent	2008	
Georgs Pelēcis			Trīspadsmitā Londonas simfonija	Thirteenth London Symphony	2000	
Krzysztof Penderecki	2		Christmas			
Krzysztof Penderecki	4		Adagio			
Krzysztof Penderecki	5		Korean			
Krzysztof Penderecki	6		Chinese Poems		2008–17	
Krzysztof Penderecki	7		The Seven Gates of Jerusalem			
Krzysztof Penderecki	8		Lieder der Vergänglichkeit	Songs of Transience		
Vincent Persichetti	7		Liturgical			
Vincent Persichetti	9		Sinfonia Janiculum	Symphony of the Janiculum		
Wilhelm Peterson-Berger	1	B♭ major	Baneret	The Banner	1889–1903, revised 1932–1933	
Wilhelm Peterson-Berger	2	E♭ major	Sunnanfärd	The Journey of Southerly Winds	1910	
Wilhelm Peterson-Berger	3	F minor	Same Ätnam	Lappland Symphony	1913–1915	
Wilhelm Peterson-Berger	4	A major	Holmia	Stockholm	1929	
Wilhelm Peterson-Berger	5	B major	Solitudo	Solitude	1923–1933	
Wilhelm Peterson-Berger	6		Hellas	Greece	1935–1936	Unfinished
Allan Pettersson	12		De Döda på Torget	The Dead of the Market Square	1974	
Václav Pichl		D major	Mars			
Václav Pichl		D major	Sinfonia Pastorale	Pastorale Symphony	c. 1800	
Willem Pijper	1		Pan		1917	
Ildebrando Pizzetti			Sinfonia del Fuoco	Symphony of Fire	1914	For the silent film Cabiria
Gavriil Popov	2	A minor	Родина	Motherland	1943	Based on music from the film score She Defends the Motherland
Gavriil Popov	3	G minor	Героическая	Heroic	1939-46	Also known as the "Spanish" for its use of Hispanic themes. It is partially derived from the soundtrack of the 1939 film "Spain".
Gavriil Popov	4		Слава Отчизне	Glory to the Fatherland	1948-49	Originally conceived as a concerto for a cappella chorus based on texts by Mikhail Golodniy
Gavriil Popov	5	A major	Пасторальная	Pastoral	1956	
Gavriil Popov	6		Праздничная	Festive	1969	
Sergei Prokofiev	1		Classical			
David del Puerto	1		Boreas			
David del Puerto	2		Nusantara			
David del Puerto	3		En la melancolía de tu recuerdo, Soria	In the Melancholy of your Memory, Soria		
Lu Qiming			Bai Qiu'en	Bethune	some point between 1959 and 1966	
Robin de Raaff	1		Tanglewood Tales		2007–2015	
Robin de Raaff	2		Two Worlds Colliding		2010	for saxophone quartet and orchestra
Robin de Raaff	3		Illumination...Eclipse		2015	
Robin de Raaff	4		Melodies unheard		2016–2017	for (mezzo) soprano and orchestra
Robin de Raaff	5		Allegory of Time		2003–2022	
Allan Rae	1		In the Shadow of Atlantis		1972	
Allan Rae	2		Winds of Change		1978	
Joachim Raff	1		An das Vaterland	To the Father Land		
Joachim Raff	3		Im Walde	In the Forest		
Joachim Raff	5		Lenore			
Joachim Raff	6		Gelebt, Gestrebt, Gelitten, Gestritten, Gestorben, Umworben			
Joachim Raff	7		In den Alpen	In the Alps		
Joachim Raff	8		Frühlingsklänge	Sounds of Spring		
Joachim Raff	9		Im Sommer	In Summer		
Joachim Raff	10		Zur Herbstzeit	To Autumn Time		
Joachim Raff	11		Der Winter	The Winter		
Ture Rangström	1	C♯ minor	August Strindberg in memoriam		1914	Dedicated in memory of August Strindberg
Ture Rangström	2	D minor	Mitt land	My Country	1919	
Ture Rangström	3	D♭ major	Sång under stjärnorna	Singing under the stars	1929	
Ture Rangström	4	D minor	Invocatio	Invocation	1935	
Einojuhani Rautavaara	2		Sinfonia Intima	Intimate Symphony	1957	
Einojuhani Rautavaara	4		Arabescata		1986	
Einojuhani Rautavaara	5		Monologue with Angels		1985-86	Name removed by the composer later on
Einojuhani Rautavaara	6		Vincentiana		1992	based on themes of his opera Vincent
Einojuhani Rautavaara	7		Angel of Light		1994	
Einojuhani Rautavaara	8		The Journey		1999	
Alan Rawsthorne	2		A Pastoral Symphony		1959	
Gardner Read			The Temptation of St. Anthony		Soon after World War II	A Dance Symphony
Carl Reinecke	2	C minor	Håkon Jarl		1874–75, rev. 1888	See Haakon Sigurdsson
Carl Reinecke			Kinder-Sinfonie	Toy Symphony	1897	See Toy Symphony (section "Other Toy Symphonies") for more information.
Leonid Rezetdinov	2		Симфония планет	Symphony of the Planets		
Leonid Rezetdinov	3		Матрица	Matrix		
Leonid Rezetdinov	4		Босх. Сады земных наслаждений	Bosch's Garden of Earthly Delights		Based on Hieronymus Bosch's The Garden of Earthly Delights
Leonid Rezetdinov			Маленькая инструментальная месса	The Little Instrument Mass		A Chamber Symphony
Leonid Rezetdinov			Модерн	Modern		A Chamber Symphony
Leonid Rezetdinov			Kleine Welten	Small World		A Chamber Symphony
Josef Rheinberger	1	D minor	Wallenstein		1866–67	
Knudåge Riisager	4		Sinfonia Gaia	Symphony Theme	1939–40	
Knudåge Riisager	5		Sinfonia serena	Serene Symphony	1949–50	
Nikolai Rimsky-Korsakov	2		Antar			
Jean Rivier	6	E minor	Les Présages	The Omens	1958	See Omen, unrelated to the ballet Les Présages
Jean Rivier	7	F major	Les Contrastes	Contrasts	1971	
Eric Rogers			Palladium Symphony			
Bernhard Romberg	1	C minor	Trauer-Symphonie	Mourning Symphony	1810?	Dedicated in memory of Queen Louise of Prussia
Bernhard Romberg	4	C major	Symphonie Burlesque and Kindersymphonie	Burlesque Symphony and Toy Symphony	1836?	This is Op. 62, not to be confused by Op. 53 symphony in C.
Julius Röntgen	5		Der Schnitter Tod	The Grim Reaper		
Julius Röntgen	10		Walzersymphonie	Waltz Symphony		
Julius Röntgen	11		Wirbelsymphonie	Vortex Symphony		
Julius Röntgen			Bitonal Symphony			
Julius Röntgen			Symphonietta Humoristica	Humouristic Sinfonietta		
Guy Ropartz	1		Sur un choral Breton	On a Breton Song	1894–95	
John Luke Rose	1		The Mystic		1973	
Hilding Rosenberg	3		De fyra livsåldrarna	The Four ages of Man	1939, rev. 1943 and 1949	Third movement added in the 1949 revision
Hilding Rosenberg	4		Johannes uppenbarelse	Revelation of Johannes	1940	For choir and orchestra, text based on the Bible by Hjalmar Gullberg
Hilding Rosenberg	5		Örtagårdsmästaren	The Master of the Herb Garden	1944	
Hilding Rosenberg	6		Sinfonia Simplice	Simple Symphony	1951	
Hilding Rosenberg	8		In candidum		1974	For choir and orchestra with text by Vilhelm Ekelund
Antonio Rosetti		D major	Symphony de chasse		1786	
Antonio Rosetti			Sinfonia di Caccia		1786	
Nobert Rosseau	2		Sinfonia liturgica	Liturgical Symphony	1961	For Orchestra and Choir.
Anton Rubinstein	2		Ocean			
Anton Rubinstein	4		Dramatic			
Edmund Rubbra	8		Hommage à Teilhard de Chardin			
Edmund Rubbra	9		Resurrection			a.k.a. Sinfonia Sacra
Edmund Rubbra	10		da Camera	Chamber Symphony		
Edmund Rubbra	11		à Colette			
Jesús Rueda	1		Laberinto	Labyrinth	2000	
Jesús Rueda	2		Acerca del Límite	About/On the Limit	2001	
Jesús Rueda	3		Luz	Light	2004-08	
Jesús Rueda	4		Julio	July	2017	
Jesús Rueda	5		Naufragios	Shipwrecks	2018-19	
Jesús Rueda	6		Huida a las Tinieblas	Flight Into Darkness	2020	
Jesús Rueda	7		Visiones Nórdicas	Nordic Visions	2021	
Jesús Rueda	8		Elegíaca	Elegiac	2021	
Jesús Rueda	9		Oblivion		2022	
Jesús Rueda	10		La Era Real	The Real/Royal Era	2022	
Jesús Rueda	11		El Camino	The Way	2023	
Jesús Rueda	12		Oceana		2023	
Jesús Rueda	13		Memoria y Deseo	Memory and Desire	2024	
Johann Rufinatscha	1	D major	Mein erstes Studium		1834	
Camille Saint-Saëns		F major	Urbs Roma	City of Rome	1856	
Camille Saint-Saëns	3	C minor	Avec Orgue	With Organ	1886	
Luis H. Salgado	1	G minor	Andina		1949	Revised in 1972 with the name Sinfonía de Ritmos Vernaculares (Symphony of Vernacular Rhythms)
Luis H. Salgado	2	D minor	Sintética N. 1	Synthetic N. 1	1953	In one movement
Luis H. Salgado	3	D major	Sobre un Tema Rococó: A-D-H-G-E	On a Rococo Theme: A-D-H-G-E	1955	
Luis H. Salgado	4	D major	Ecuatoriana	Ecuadorian	1957	
Luis H. Salgado	5		Neo-Romántica	Neo-Romantic	1958	
Luis H. Salgado		D major	Sintética N. 2	Synthetic 2	1977	In one movement
Aulis Sallinen	2		Symphonic Dialogue			(All his symphonies listed here)
Aulis Sallinen	5		Washington Mosaics			
Aulis Sallinen	6		From a New Zealand Diary			
Aulis Sallinen	7		The Dreams of Gandalf			
Aulis Sallinen	8		Autumnal Fragments			
Robert Levine Sanders	1	G	Little Symphony		1936–37	In 1938, won the New York Philharmonic Symphony Society award. The 1943 symphony in B♭ major is for concert band.
Cláudio Santoro	4		Sinfonia da Paz	Symphony of Peace	1953	
Cláudio Santoro	7		Brasília		1960	
Cláudio Santoro	10		Amazonas		1982	
Joly Braga Santos	5		Virtus Lusitaniae	Virtue of Portugal	1966	
Fazıl Say	1		Istanbul Symphony		2009	
Fazıl Say	2		Mesopotamia		2011	
Fazıl Say	3		Universe		2012	
Pierre Schaeffer and Pierre Henry			Symphonie pour un homme seul	Symphony for One Man Alone	1949–1950	multi-movement musique concrète composition, premiered 1950 several revisions including a 1966 one by Henry
Philipp Scharwenka	1		Herbstfeier	Fall Celebration		
Josef Schelb			Sinfonia Apocaliptica	Apocalyptic Symphony		
Hans Bronsart von Schellendorff	1		In die Alpen	In the Alps		For choir and orchestra, lost
Hans Bronsart von Schellendorff	2		Schicksalsgewalten	Forces of Fate		Lost
Martin Scherber	1–3	D minor, B minor, F minor		Metamorphosis-Symphonies	1938, 1951–52, 1954–55	This is the name given by the composer to his 3 symphonies
Christopher Schlegel	1	C major	Odyssey			
Christopher Schlegel	2	E minor	Viking			
Christopher Schlegel	3	F major	Virtues of a Man		1999?	
Christopher Schlegel	4	F major	America			
Christopher Schlegel	5	G♯ minor	Athena			
Christopher Schlegel	6		Values			
Gaetono Maria Schiassi				Christmas Symphony		
Heather Schmidt	1		Manufactured Landscapes		2005	
Florent Schmitt	3		Janiana		1941	
Franz Schubert	4	C minor	Tragische	Tragic	1816	D 417; See also List of compositions by Schubert#Symphonies
Franz Schubert	6	C major	Kleine Sinfonie C-Dur	Little C major	1817–18	D 589
Franz Schubert	8	B minor	Unvollendete	Unfinished	1822	D 759. Occasionally listed as No. 7
Franz Schubert	9	C major	Große Sinfonie C-Dur	Great C major	1825–1828	D 944. Also listed as No. 7 or No. 8 Identified as the elusive Gmunden-Gasteiner Sinfonie (Gastein Symphony). However the Gmunden-Gastein name may also refer to the Symphony in E major (also titled "1825") by Gunter Elsholz who wrote it under Schubert's name.
Franz Schubert	10	D major	The Last		1828	D 936a. Reconstruction based on sketches
Erwin Schulhoff			Symphonia Germanica	Germanic Symphony	1919	A satirical symphony
Erwin Schulhoff	6		Svobody	Freedom	1940	For chorus and orchestra
Georg Schumann	1	B minor	Preis-Symphonie	Prize Symphony	1887	
Robert Schumann	1		Frühling	Spring		
Robert Schumann	3		Rheinische	Rhenish		
Daniel Bruno Schvetz	4		Sinfonía Apocalíptica	Apocalyptic Symphony	2006	Dedicated to Edoardo Sanguineti for his Abecedario Apocalíptico
Alexander Scriabin	3	C minor	Le Divin Poème	The Divine Poem	1902-04	
Alexander Scriabin	4		Le Poème de l'extase	The Poem of Ecstasy	1905-07	Despite being considered a symphonic poem, the composer referred to it as his fourth symphony
Alexander Scriabin	5		Prométhée: Le Poème du Feu	Prometheus: The Poem of Fire	1908-10	Also referred to by the composer as his fifth symphony
Antonio Scontrino			Sinfonia marinesca	Marine Symphony		
Antonio Scontrino			Sinfonia romantica	Romantic Symphony		
Giovanni Sgambati			Sinfonia festiva	Festive Symphony	1878	This is not a numbered symphony. It is also called "Ouverture d'fete".
Giovanni Sgambati			Epitalamio sinfonico	Symphonic epithalamium	1887	The Naxos recording calls it "Sinfonia epitalamio" (Nuptial Symphony). Not a numbered symphony.
Ding Shande			Changzeng	Long March	some point between 1959 and 1966	
Harold Shapero			Symphony for Classical Orchestra		1947	
Michael Jeffrey Shapiro	1		Pomes Penyeach			
Rodion Shchedrin	2		25 прелюдий	25 Preludes	1965	
Rodion Shchedrin	3		Лица русских сказок	Scenes of Russian Fairy Tales	2000	
Vladimir Shcherbachov	2		Blok		1925	For choir and orchestra, choir text based on works by Alexander Blok. Also spelled as Blokovskaya.
Vladimir Shcherbachov	4		Ижорская	Izhora	1932–1934 (1935?)	Also spelled as Izhorskaya, or "History of the Izhorsky Factory".
Vladimir Shcherbachov	5		Русская	Russian	1948, revised 1950	Also spelled Russkaya, or "The Russian".
Minao Shibata	2		ゆく河の流れは絶えずして	The neverending flow of the river	1975	For chorus and orchestra
Dmitri Shostakovich	2	B major	To October			
Dmitri Shostakovich	3	E♭ major	The First of May			
Dmitri Shostakovich	7	C major	Leningrad			
Dmitri Shostakovich	11	G minor	The Year 1905			
Dmitri Shostakovich	12	D minor	The Year 1917			
Dmitri Shostakovich	13	B♭ minor	Babi Yar			
Andriy Shtoharenko	1		Україна моя	My Ukraine	1942–43	Symphony-cantata
Andriy Shtoharenko	2		Пам`яті товариша	In Memory of a Comrade	1965	
Andriy Shtoharenko	3		Київська	Kyivska	1972	
Andriy Shtoharenko	4		Симфонічні казки	Symphony tales	1973	
Andriy Shtoharenko	6		Біографічна	Biography	1978	
Jean Sibelius		E minor	Kullervo		1891-92	The piece is a large-scale hybrid of a symphony and a symphonic poem
Rudolph Simonsen	1		Zion		1920s	
Rudolph Simonsen	2		Hellas	Greek	1920s	
Roman Simovych	1		Гуцульська	Hutsul	1945	
Roman Simovych	2		Лемківська	Lemkivska [or Lemko]	1947	
Roman Simovych	3		Весняна	Spring	1951	
Roman Simovych	4		Героїчна	Heroic	1954	
Roman Simovych	5		Гірська	Mountain	1955	
Ādolfs Skulte	1	F minor		On Peace	1954	
Ādolfs Skulte	2	G♯ minor		Ave Sol	1959	Based on words by Rainis
Ādolfs Skulte	3	C minor		Cosmic	1963	
Ādolfs Skulte	4	A major		Youth	1965	
Ādolfs Skulte	7			Preserve Nature!	1981	
Klement Slavický	4		Pax hominibus in universo orbi	Peace to people all over the world	1985	Dedicated to the United Nations' 40 year anniversary.
Sergei Slonimsky	10		Cercles de l'enfer	The Circles of Hell	1992	
Bedřich Smetana	1	E major	Triumfální symfonie	Triumphal Symphony	1853–1854, revised 1881	Dedicated to the wedding of Franz Joseph I of Austria
Robert W. Smith	1		The Divine Comedy			
Robert W. Smith	2		The Odyssey			
Robert W. Smith	3		Don Quixote			
Robert W. Smith			Symphony of Souls			
Arthur Sommervell	1	D minor	Thalassa		1912	
Kaikhosru Shapurji Sorabji	1		Tāntrik Symphony for Piano Alone		1938–39	for piano
Kaikhosru Shapurji Sorabji	2		Jāmī		1942–51	for orchestra, chorus and baritone
Kaikhosru Shapurji Sorabji	5		Symphonia brevis for Piano	Brief Symphony for Piano	1973	for piano
Kaikhosru Shapurji Sorabji	6		Symphonia claviensis	Symphony for Piano	1975–76	for piano
Enrique Soro	1	A major	Sinfonía romántica	Romantic Symphony		One of the first symphonies composed in Chile
Vladimír Soukup	1			Youth	1954	
Vladimír Soukup	2			Dramatic	1962	
Vladimír Soukup	3		Canto Allegro	Song of Joy	1964	
Phillip Sparke	1		A Pittsburg Symphony		1990–92	
Phillip Sparke	2		Earth, Water, Sun, Wind		1999	
Phillip Sparke	3		Colour Symphony		2014	
Carl Stamitz		D major	Symphonie de Chasse			
Charles Villiers Stanford	2		Elegiac			
Charles Villiers Stanford	3		Irish			
Charles Villiers Stanford	5		L'Allegro ed il Penseroso			
Charles Villiers Stanford	6		In Memoriam G. F. Watts			
Yevhen Stankovych	2		Heroic			
Yevhen Stankovych	3		Affirmed			
Yevhen Stankovych	4		Lyrical			
Yevhen Stankovych	5		Pastoral			
Yevhen Stankovych			In memory of a poet			Chamber Symphony 4
Yevhen Stankovych			Secret Desires			Chamber Symphony 5
Yevhen Stankovych			Maxim Berezovsky			Chamber Symphony 10; Dedicated to Maxim Berezovsky
Bernard Stevens	1		A Symphony of Liberation		1945	
William Grant Still	1	A♭ major	Afro-American		1930	
William Grant Still	2	G minor	Song of A New Race		1936-37	
William Grant Still	3		Sunday Symphony		1958	
William Grant Still	4		Autochthonous		1947	
William Grant Still	5		Western Hemisphere		1945, rev 1947	
Richard Strauss			Eine Alpensinfonie	An Alpine Symphony		
Richard Strauss			Symphonia Domestica	Domestic Symphony		
Igor Stravinsky			Symphony of Psalms			
Igor Stravinsky			Symphonies d'instruments à vent	Symphonies of Wind Instruments		single-movement work for wind ensemble, not actually a symphony
Josef Suk	2		Asrael	Azrael		
Stjepan Šulek	2		Eroica		1946	
Stjepan Šulek			Epitaf		1971	
Stjepan Šulek			Runke		1972	
Franz Xaver Süssmayr		C major	Sinfonia Turchesca	Turkish Symphony	1790	See Turkish music (style)
Lubawa Sydorenko	1		Ab Inito	From the Beginning	2004	Premiered in 2009; With a violin solo
Takashi Yoshimatsu	1		カムイチカプ交響曲	Kamui-Chikap Symphony	1988–90	Kamui-Chikap meaning "divine bird"
Takashi Yoshimatsu	2		地球にて	On Earth	1990–91	
Takashi Yoshimatsu	6		鳥と天使たち	Birds and Angels	2013	
Pyotr Ilyich Tchaikovsky	1			Winter Daydreams		
Pyotr Ilyich Tchaikovsky	2			Little Russian		
Pyotr Ilyich Tchaikovsky	3			Polish		
Pyotr Ilyich Tchaikovsky			Ма́нфред	Manfred Symphony	1885	Op. 58. Premiered 1886
Pyotr Ilyich Tchaikovsky	6		Pathétique	Pathetic Symphony		
Jivan Gurgeni Ter-T'at'evosian	2		Sud'ba cheloveka	The Fate of a Man		
Jivan Gurgeni Ter-T'at'evosian	5		Paganini			
Mikis Theodorakis	1		Proti Simfonia		1948-54	
Mikis Theodorakis	2		Song of the Earth		1980-82	
Mikis Theodorakis	4		Of the Choral Odes		1986-87	
Mikis Theodorakis	5		Spring Symphony		1978-84	
Johannes Paul Thilman	1–3	G major, F major, and D major	Kleine Sinfonie	Little Symphony	1951, 1952, 1953	
Virgil Thomson	1		Symphony on a Hymn Tune		1926–28	The hymns which the symphony is based on are Jesus Loves Me and How Firm a Foundation
Ernst Toch	5		Jephtha, Rhapsodic Poem			
Charles Tournemire	1	A major	Romantique	Romantic	1900	
Charles Tournemire	2	B major	Quessant		1908–09	
Charles Tournemire	3	D major	Moscau	Moscow	1912–13	
Charles Tournemire	4		Pages Symphoniques	Symphonic Pages	1912–13	
Charles Tournemire	5	F major	De la montagne	The Mountain	1913–14	
Charles Tournemire	7		Les danses de la Vie	Dances of Life	1918–22	
Charles Tournemire	8		Le triomphe de la mort	Triumph of Death	1920–24	
Charles Tournemire			Symphonie-Choral	Choral Symphony	1935	For organ
Charles Tournemire			Symphonie sacrée	Sacred Symphony		For organ
Nguyễn Lân Tuất	1		Dự cảm nội chiến	Premonition to Civil War	1981	
Nguyễn Lân Tuất	2		Tổ quốc tôi	My Fatherland	1984	
Nguyễn Lân Tuất	3		Tiếng hát trong tù	The Condemned one's dreams	1989	Also called "Singing in Prison"
Nguyễn Lân Tuất	4		Gửi người yêu nơi xa	To a faraway lover	1995	
Nguyễn Lân Tuất	5		Đời nghệ sĩ	Artist's life	2013–	Incomplete as the composer died in 2014.
Eduard Tubin	2		Legendary			
Eduard Tubin	3		Heroic			
Eduard Tubin	4		Lyrical			
Eduard Tubin	9		Sinfonia semplice	Simple Symphony		
Joaquín Turina			Sinfonía sevillana	Seville Symphony	1920	
Joaquín Turina			Sinfonía del mar	Symphony of the sea	1945–1981	Turina died in 1949, at that point the symphony was still incomplete, the symphony would only be completed in 1981 by Manuel Castillo Navarro-Aguilera
Viktor Ullmann	1		Von meiner Jugend	From my Youth	Some point between September 1942 and October 1944	This was written while Ullmann was in the Theresienstadt concentration camp.
Galina Ustvolskaya	2		True and Eternal Bliss!		1979	Text based on work by Hermann of Reichenau
Galina Ustvolskaya	3		Jesus Messiah, Save Us!		1983	Based on works by Hermann of Reichenau
Galina Ustvolskaya	4		Prayer		1985–87	Based on work by Hermann of Reichenau
Galina Ustvolskaya	5		Amen		1989–90	
Jan Van der Roost	1		Sinfonia Hungarica	Hungarian Symphony		
Ralph Vaughan Williams	1		A Sea Symphony			
Ralph Vaughan Williams	2		A London Symphony			
Ralph Vaughan Williams	3		Pastoral Symphony			
Ralph Vaughan Williams	7		Sinfonia antartica			
Ernest Vanjura		C major		Ukrainian Symphony	~1790	The Piano form of the symphony was published, in fact being the only symphony part of Vanjura's Trois Sinfonies Nationales to be published during the composer's lifetime. From this, the orchestration was done by Mykhailo Verykivsky, however Margarita Pavlovna Prâšnikova rediscovered the original score of all 3.
Ernest Vanjura		E♭ major		Russian Symphony	~1790	Part of Vanjura's Trois Sinfonies Nationales
Ernest Vanjura		B♭ major		Polish Symphony	~1790	Part of Vanjura's Trois Sinfonies Nationales
Solon C. Verret	2?		Symphonie des glaïeuls	Gladiolus Symphony		See Gladiolus
Solon C. Verret	3?		Symphonie des nuits tropicales	Symphony of Tropical Nights		
Anatol Vieru	1		Oda tacerii	Ode to Silence	1967	
Anatol Vieru	3		La un cutremur	At an Earthquake	1978	
Anatol Vieru	6		Exodus		1989	
Anatol Vieru	7		Anul soarelui calm	The Year of the Tranquil Sun	1992–93	
Pedro Vilarroig	3		Filosófica	Philosophical	1979	
Pedro Vilarroig	4		Cosmos		1980	
Pedro Vilarroig	5		Renacer	Rebirth	1983	
Pedro Vilarroig	7		Tempestad	Tempest	1986	
Pedro Vilarroig	9		Génesis	Genesis	2006	
Heitor Villa-Lobos	1		O Imprevisto	The Unforeseen		
Heitor Villa-Lobos	2		Ascenção	The Ascension		
Heitor Villa-Lobos	3		A Guerra	The War		
Heitor Villa-Lobos	4		A Vitória	The Victory		
Heitor Villa-Lobos	5		A Paz	The Peace		lost
Heitor Villa-Lobos	6		Sobre a linha das montanhas do Brasil	On the Outline of the Mountains of Brasil		
Heitor Villa-Lobos	10		Sumé Pater Patrium: Sinfonia Amerindia	Sumé, Father of Fathers: Amerindian Symphony		
Antonio Vivaldi		B minor	Sinfonia al Santo Sepolcro	Symphony for the Holy Sepulcher		sonata for 2 violins, viola & continuo, RV 169
Vladimir Vlasov			Симфония "Патетическая"	"Pathetic" Symphony	1980	For coloratura soprano, women choir and orchestra
Georg Joseph Vogler		C major	La Scala	The Stairs	1799	
William Wallace	1		Creation Symphony		prem. 1899	
Hermann Wolfgang von Waltershausen			Apokalyptische Symphonie	Apocalyptic Symphony	~1925	
Leyou Wang	1		Xiangsheng	Crosstalks	~2019	
Robert Ward	5		Canticles of America		1976	
Robert Ward	7		The Savannah		2003	
Egan Wegan	4	D major	Saturn			
Mieczysław Weinberg	8			Flowers of Poland	1964	
Mieczysław Weinberg	9			Everlasting Time	1940–67	
Mieczysław Weinberg	11			Festive Symphony	1969	
Mieczysław Weinberg	12			In Memoriam of D. Shostakovich	1975–76	Dedicated to Dmitri Shostakovich
Mieczysław Weinberg	15			I Believe in This Earth	1977	
Mieczysław Weinberg	17			Memory	1984	
Mieczysław Weinberg	18			War, there is no word more cruel	1986	
Mieczysław Weinberg	19			The Bright May	1986	
Mieczysław Weinberg	21		Kaddish		1991	
Karl Weigl	5		Apocalyptic Symphony		1945	
Julius Weismann			Sinfonia Brevis	Short Symphony		
Paul W. Whear	1		Stonehenge Symphony			
Charles-Marie Widor	9	C minor	Symphonie Gothique	Gothic Symphony	1895	for organ solo
Charles-Marie Widor	10	D major	Symphonie Romane	Roman Symphony	1899	for organ solo
Charles-Marie Widor		C minor	Sinfonia sacra	Sacred Symphony	1908	for organ and orchestra
Charles-Marie Widor			Symphonie antique	Ancient Symphony	1911	for soloists, chorus, organ and orchestra
Alberto Williams	2	C minor	La bruja de las montañas	The witch of the mountains	1910	
Alberto Williams	3	F major		The Sacred Forest	1911	
Alberto Williams	4	E♭ major	El ataja-caminos		1935	
Alberto Williams	5	E♭ major	El corazón de la muñeca	The Doll's heart	1936	
Alberto Williams	6	B major		The Death of the Comet	1937	
Alberto Williams	7	D	Eterno Reposo	Eternal Rest	1937	
Alberto Williams	8	F minor		The Sphinx	1938	
Alberto Williams	9	B♭	Los batracios (La humorística)		1939	
Malcolm Williamson	1		Elevamini			
Malcolm Williamson	2		Pilgrim på Havet			
Malcolm Williamson	3		The Icy Mirror			
Malcolm Williamson	4		Jubilee			
Malcolm Williamson	5		Aquerò			
Malcolm Williamson	6		Liturgy of Homage			full title: Liturgy of Homage to the Australian Broadcasting Commission in its Fiftieth Year as University to the Australian Nation
Meredith Willson	1		A Symphony of San Francisco			
Meredith Willson	2		Missions of California			
Thomas Wilson	4		Passeleth Tapestry		1988	Commissioned by Renfrew District Council together with Strathclyde Regional Council to mark Paisley's 500th anniversary as a Burgh of Barony.
Jason Wright Wingate	2		Kleetüden			
Friedrich Witt	6	A minor	Turque	Turkish		
Friedrich Witt	14	C major	Jenaer Sinfonie	Jena Symphony	1793?	Upon its discovery (1909) attributed to Beethoven, later more probable attribution to Witt
William Wordsworth	6		Elegiaca	Elegiac	1977	Dedicated to the composer's son, Tim Wordsworth, after he was killed in a car crash in 1971. Words based on works by Percy Bysshe Shelley, John Donne, and Edna St. Vincent Millay. For baritone, mezzo-soprano, chorus, and orchestra.
William Wordsworth	7		Cosmos		1980	
William Wordsworth	8		Pax Hominibus	Peace to Men	1986	
Bolesław Woytowicz	2		Warszawska	Warsaw	1945	
Guan Xia	2		希望	Hope	1999	
Wang Xilin				Symphony of Shangdang Bangzi	1974	
Wang Xilin	6		Song of Life		2004	
Wang Xilin	7			He Yi Zhuang Cheng	2007	
Wang Xilin	8			Comedic Dialogue	2009	Chamber symphony
Wang Xilin	9			China Requiem	2015	
Xian Xinghai	1		民族解放	Liberation of the Nation	1941	
Xian Xinghai	2		神圣之战	The Holy War	1943	
Kosaku Yamada		F major	かちどきと平和	Triumph and Peace	1912	
Kosaku Yamada			舞踏交響曲『マグダラのマリア』"	Choreographic Symphony "Mary Magdalene"	1916-18	After sketches from an unrealise ballet
Kosaku Yamada			交響曲『明治頌歌』	Symphony "Inno Meiji"	1921	
Kosaku Yamada			長唄交響曲『鶴亀』	Nagauta Symphony "Tsurukane"	1934	
Oleg Yanchenko	1		Эроика	Eroica	1966	
Oleg Yanchenko	2		Андрей Рублёв	Andriy Rublev	1977	
Oleg Yanchenko	3		Белая Вежа	Belaya Vezha	1982	
Oleg Yanchenko	4		Слово о полку Игореве	The Tales of Igor's Campaign	1985	
Oleg Yanchenko	5		Мемориал Микеланджело	Michelangelo Memorial	1988	
Oleg Yanchenko	6		Апокалипси	Apocalypse	1994	
Boris Yarovinsky	2	A minor	Романтична	Romantic		
Shi Yong-Kang			Dongfang de shuguang	Dawn in the East	some point between 1959 and 1966	
Webster A. Young	1		1977 – Davis to Paris		1977	
Webster A. Young	3		California			
Webster A. Young	4		Oregon			
Webster A. Young	5		The Gold Guitar		2014	
Bao Yuan-kai				Son of the people	2004	
Bao Yuan-kai	1			Jubilee	2004	
Bao Yuan-kai	2			Sketch of War	2005	
Bao Yuan-kai	3			Beijing Opera	2006	
Wang Yunjie	1			To Construct the Motherland	1956	
Wang Yunjie	2		Kang Ri zhanzheng	The War of Resistance Against Japan	some point between 1959 and 1966	
Eugene Zador				A children's symphony		
Mario Zafred	3		Canto del Carso	Song of Carso	1949	See Carso
Mario Zafred	4		In onore della resistenza	In honor of the resistance	1950	
Mario Zafred	5		Prati e boschi della primavera	Spring meadows and woods	1952	
Winfried Zillig			Tanzsymphonie	Dance Symphony		
Ján Zimmer	6		Improvisata		1965	Op. 51
Ján Zimmer	10		Homage to Haydn		1979	Op. 92; Dedicated to Franz Haydn
Niccolò Antonio Zingarelli		In order: D major, E♭ major, F major, D major, G minor, C major, D major, and finally E major	Sinfonia Milanese	Milanese Symphony		This is a series of symphonies called "Sinfonia Milanese", in this series there are 8 symphonies.
Niccolò Antonio Zingarelli		C minor	Sinfonia Funebre	Funeral Symphony	1836	
Bernard Zweers	3	B♭ major	Aan Mijn Vaderland	To my Fatherland	1886–90	
Ellen Taaffe Zwilich	1		Three Movements for Orchestra			
Sergey Zyatov	1		Symphonia in Prata	Symphony in the Meadows	2019	

== See also ==
- List of classical music sub-titles, nicknames and non-numeric titles
