= The Sun Also Rises (disambiguation) =

The Sun Also Rises is a 1926 Ernest Hemingway novel.

It may also refer to:

== Adaptations of the Hemingway novel ==
- The Sun Also Rises (1957 film), an adaptation directed by Henry King
- The Sun Also Rises (1984 film), an adaptation directed by James Goldstone
- The Sun Also Rises (opera), a 2000 adaptation by Webster A. Young
- The Select (The Sun Also Rises), a 2011 stage adaptation by Elevator Repair Service

== Music ==
- The Sun Also Rises (duo), a folk music duo formed in the late 1960s
- The Sun Also Rises, an album by Fish Leong, 2019
- "The Sun Also Rises", a song by Brave Saint Saturn from The Light of Things Hoped For, 2003
- "The Sun Also Rises", a song by Delphic on Collections, 2013
- "The Sun Also Rises", a song by Johnny Flynn and Robert MacFarlane on The Moon Also Rises, 2023

== Film and television ==
- The Sun Also Rises (2007 film), a film by Jiang Wen unrelated to the above Hemingway novel
- "The Sun Also Rises" (The Vampire Diaries), an episode of the television series The Vampire Diaries

== See also ==
- The Son Also Rises (disambiguation)
