= Leonid Rezetdinov =

Russian composer

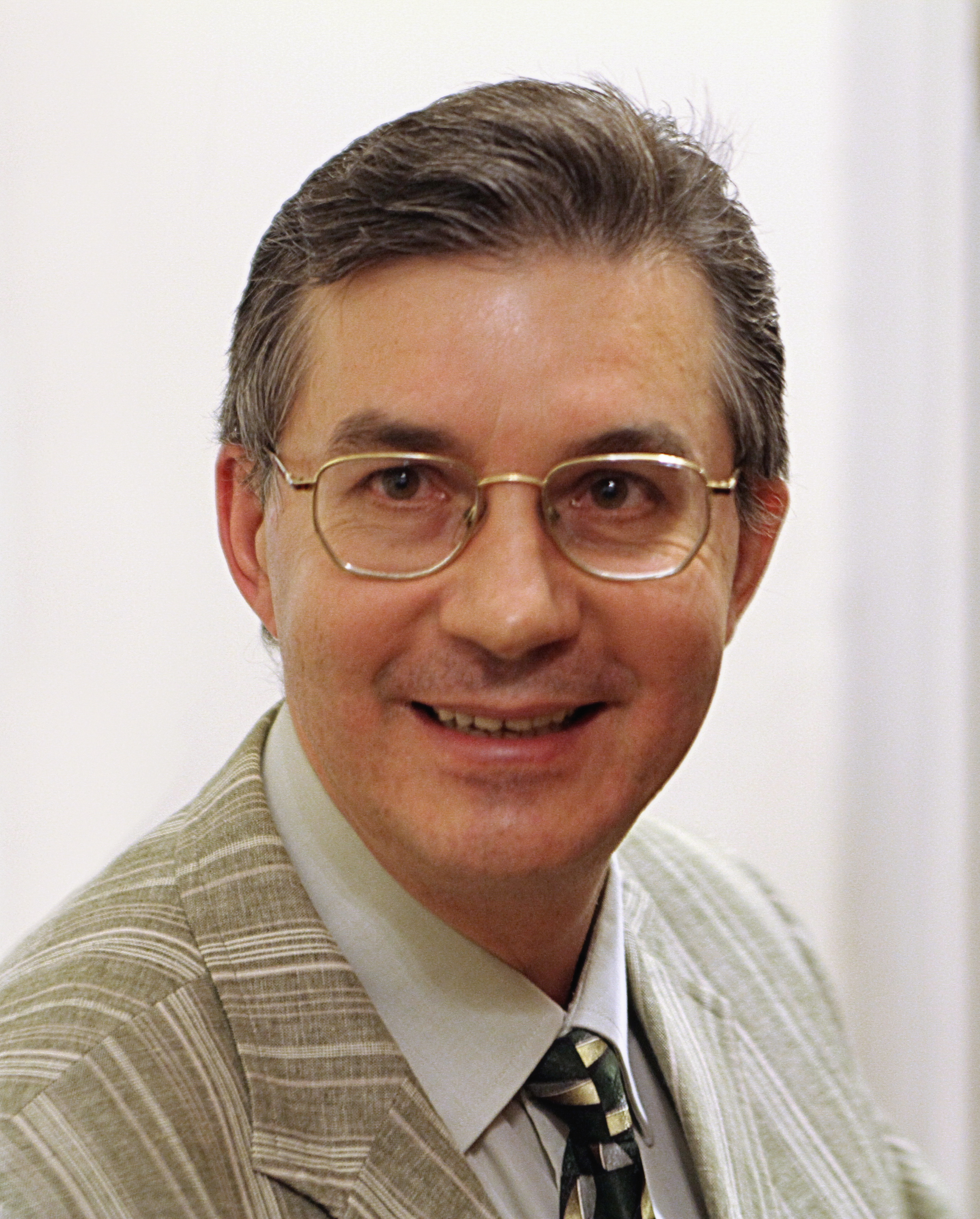
Portrait of Leonid Rezetdinov

Leonid Fiatovich Rezetdinov (Russian: Леонид Фиатович Резетдинов; August 5, 1961) is a Russian composer and a winner of the National Prize of the Russian Academy of Advertising. He was born in Leningrad (now Saint Petersburg) and attended Saint Petersburg Conservatory where he was under guidance of Boris Tishchenko till 1985. In 1988 he joined Russian Union of Composers and two years later became an attendee of the International Society for Contemporary Music where his teacher was Witold Lutosławski. For eight years after it, he was a teacher at the Musical College of Rimsky-Korsakov and by 2000 became a CEO and record producer at Studio Digital Film Production of Saint-Petersburg Documentary Film Studio. The same year he joined Music Fund and became an author of over 30 film scores. In 2009 he won the first prize at the Berdyansk International Film Festival and since then worked with various conductors such as Vladimir Altschuler, Valery Gergiev and Stanislav Gribkov. He also worked with Leonid Korchmar, Ravil Martynov, Vasily Petrenko, Rashid Skuratov, and Alexander Titov and has traveled throughout Europe, Asia and North America.
