= Symphony No. 69 (Haydn) =

Symphony in four movements by Joseph Haydn

- Laudon
- by Joseph Haydn
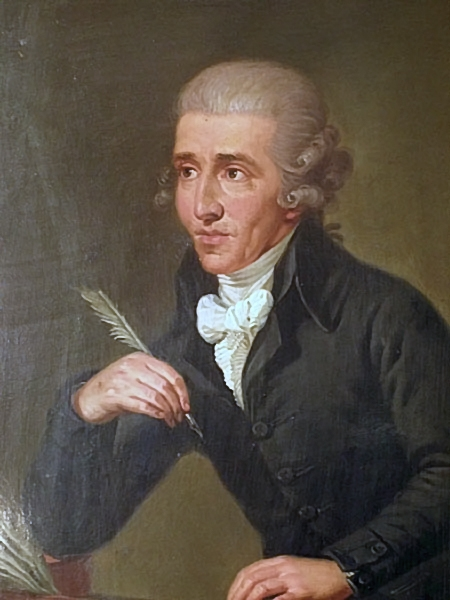
- Portrait of Joseph Haydn, ca. 1770
- Key: C major
- Catalogue: Hob. I:69
- Composed: 1775-76
- Publisher: Artaria
- Duration: c. 20 minutes
- Movements: 4
- Scoring: Orchestra

The Symphony No. 69 is a symphony by Joseph Haydn in C major, Hoboken I/69, known as the Laudon Symphony. Composed around 1775–1776, it represents a stylistic departure from the composer's earlier intense Sturm und Drang period and was written at the same time as Haydn was writing numerous comic operas. Despite the lighter tone, however, the symphony is "as finely crafted, as interesting, indeed as original, as the preceding ones, albeit very different in character."

== Nickname ==
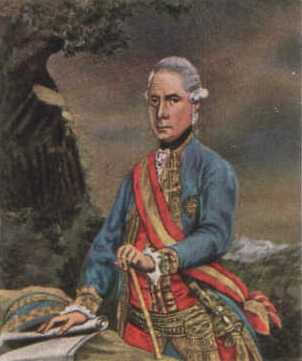
Field Marshal Laudon for whom the 69th symphony is nicknamed

The nickname originated with Haydn's publisher Artaria, who issued a version for solo piano in the mid-1770s. As a device for increasing sales, Artaria attached to the work the name of a popular Austrian war hero, General Ernst Gideon Freiherr von Laudon. Haydn agreed to make the keyboard arrangement, but insisted on omitting the final movement as inappropriate for keyboard performance. However, he endorsed Artaria's sales maneuver, writing to his publisher on April 8, 1783 that the title "wird zu Beförderung des Verkaufes mehr als zehen Finale beytragen" (will produce more sales than ten finales).

H. C. Robbins Landon's view that the title "is Haydn's own ... to honour the famous Austrian Feldmarschall who conquered the Turks and made Europe safe for Austrian monarchism" is inaccurate. As a post-facto addition, the title was borne from purely economic motivation and does not reflect any conscious military theme in Haydn's original conception. Instead, the similarities of the festive opening with the composer's earlier 48th symphony was likely the inspiration for Artaria's idea.

== Movements ==
The Laudon Symphony is scored for two oboes, two bassoons, two horns in C basso, two trumpets, timpani and strings.

It is in the standard four-movement form:

1. Vivace, 2/2
2. Un poco adagio più tosto andante, 3/4 in F major
3. Minuet & Trio, 3/4
4. Finale: Presto, 2/4

== See also ==
- Artaria
- List of symphonies by name
