= Symphony No. 30 (Haydn) =

Symphony in three movements by Joseph Haydn

- Alleluia
- by Joseph Haydn
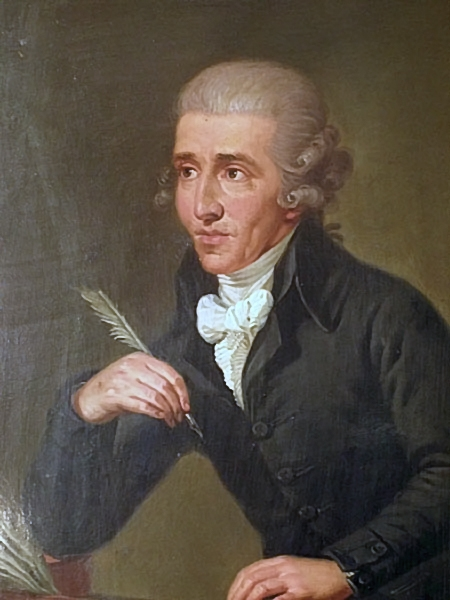
- Portrait of Joseph Haydn, ca. 1770
- Key: C major
- Catalogue: Hob. I:30
- Composed: 1765
- Duration: c. 15 minutes
- Movements: 3
- Scoring: Orchestra with continuo

The Symphony No. 30 in C major, Hob. I:30, is a symphony by Joseph Haydn composed in 1765, at the age of 33. It is nicknamed the Alleluia Symphony because of his use of a Gregorian Alleluia chant in the opening movement.

A performance of the symphony would last roughly 15 minutes.

== Description ==
The Alleluia chant of the first movement has been confused with the principal melodic line in the finale of Mozart's Symphony No. 41 in C major. Mozart did use this Alleluia chant melody for his Alleluia Canon, K. 553, written shortly after he completed his C major symphony.

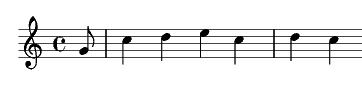
The Alleluia theme of the first movement

The work is scored for flute, two oboes, bassoon, two horns, trumpets, timpani, and strings with continuo. The use of timpani in this symphony remains an unresolved matter. In his cycle, for example, Antal Doráti omits them. Several more recent performances, however, have included timpani.

The work is in three movements:

1. Allegro, 4/4
2. Andante, 2/4 in G major
3. Tempo di Menuet, più tosto allegro, 3/4

The Alleluia motif dominates the first movement. It is the first theme; the second theme is also derived from it and it is also included in the closing material of the exposition. In the development, after the first theme is restated, the first three notes of the motif (do-re-mi) are repeated seven times at different pitch levels against sixteenth-note accompaniment.

The second movement contains numerous solo concertante passages for the flute. The rare choice of the dominant key for a second movement (subdominant was more common in Haydn) was likely because G major was a favorable key for the flute.

Mark Ferraguto has discussed Haydn's deliberate use of spare instrumental scoring and minimal melodic material in the trio of the symphony.

== See also ==
- List of symphonies by name
