= Symphony No. 6 (Haydn) =

Symphony by Joseph Haydn

- Le matin
- by Joseph Haydn
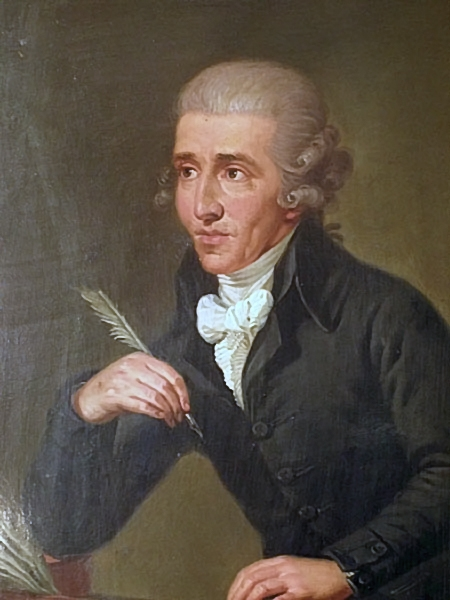
- Portrait of Joseph Haydn, ca. 1770
- Key: D major
- Catalogue: Hob. I:6
- Composed: 1761
- Dedication: Paul II Anton Esterházy
- Duration: c. 20 minutes
- Movements: 4
- Scoring: Orchestra

Premiere
- Date: 1761
- Location: Vienna
- Conductor: Joseph Haydn
- Performers: Prince Esterházy’s court orchestra

The Symphony No. 6 in D major (Hoboken 1/6) is an early symphony written in 1761 by Joseph Haydn and the first written after Haydn had joined the Esterházy court. It is the first of three that are characterized by unusual virtuoso writing across the orchestral ensemble. It is popularly known as Le matin ("Morning").

== Background and scoring ==
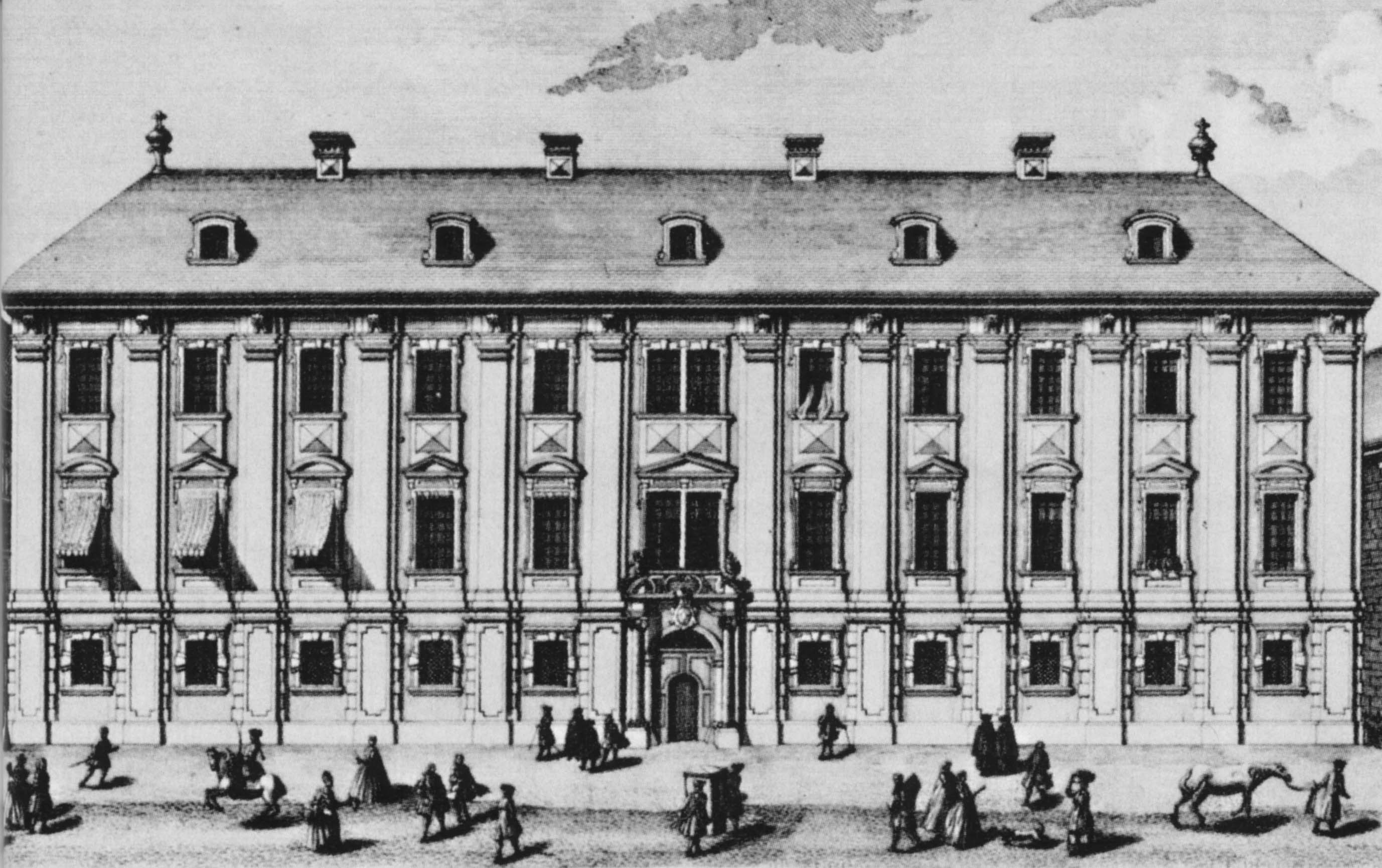
The Esterházy Palace on Vienna's Wallnerstraße, where this symphony premiered.

Haydn wrote this, his first symphonic work for his new employer Prince Paul II Anton Esterházy, in the spring of 1761, shortly after joining the court. He had signed his employment contract with him on 1 May 1761. Prince Paul gave Haydn the three times of day as a theme for composition.

The Esterházys maintained in permanent residence an excellent chamber orchestra and with his first contribution for it in the symphonic genre, Haydn fully exploited the talents of the players. In this, Haydn was consciously drawing on the familiar tradition of the concerto grosso, exemplified by the works of Antonio Vivaldi, Giuseppe Tartini, and Tomaso Albinoni then much in vogue at courts across Europe. All three symphonies (Nos. 6, 7 and 8) feature extensive solo passages for the wind, horn and strings, including rare solo writing for the double bass and bassoon in the third movement of No. 6. The work is scored for flute, two oboes, bassoon, two horns in D, violin I, violin II, viola, cello, double bass, and harpsichord ad libitum.

It has been commonly suggested that Haydn's motivation was to curry favour both with his new employer (by making reference to a familiar and popular tradition) and, perhaps more importantly, with the players upon whose goodwill he depended. Typically during this period, players who performed challenging solo passages or displayed unusual virtuosity received financial reward. By highlighting virtually all of the players in this regard, Haydn was, literally, spreading the wealth.

== Subtitle (Le matin) ==
The subtitle (not Haydn's own, but quickly adopted) derives from the opening slow introduction of the opening movement, which clearly depicts sunrise. The remainder of the work is abstract, as, indeed, are the other two symphonies in the series. Because of the initial association, however, the remaining were quickly and complementarily named "noon" and "evening".

== Movements ==
The symphony has four movements:

1. Adagio, 4/4 – Allegro, 3/4
2. Adagio, 4/4 – Andante, 3/4 – Adagio in G major, 4/4
3. Menuet e Trio (Trio in D minor), 3/4
4. Finale: Allegro, 2/4

Following the sunrise-depicting introduction, the Allegro kicks off immediately with solo passages for flute and oboe. At the end of the development, a solo horn states the opening flute theme in the tonic, reminding modern listeners of the premature entry of the horn at the end of the development of the first movement of Ludwig van Beethoven's Eroica Symphony composed forty years later. The melody also bears resemblance to the first theme (also stated by the horn) in the finale of Beethoven’s Pastoral Symphony.

The slow movement is an Andante featuring passages for solo violin and solo cello bracketed by an Adagio on both ends. The leading Adagio is based on a hexachord.

The minuet also contains concertante passages. A solo flute is heard accompanied by violins as well as a section with wind-band scoring. The trio begins with solo passages by the double bass and bassoon and are later joined by solo viola.

The finale has a concerto grosso feel with virtuosi passages for cello, violin and flute.

== See also ==
- List of symphonies by name
