= Symphony No. 48 (Haydn) =

Symphony by Joseph Haydn

- Maria Theresa
- by Joseph Haydn
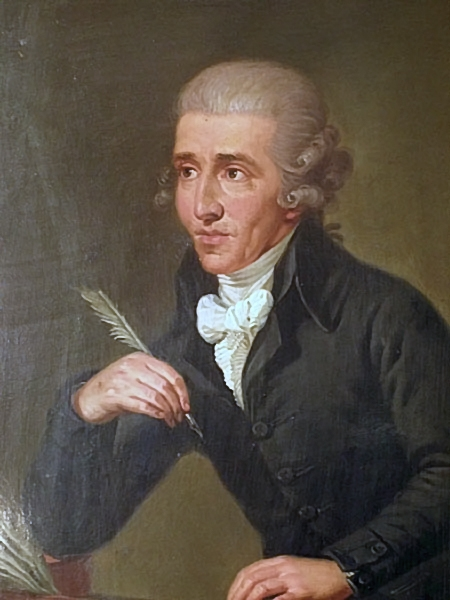
- Portrait of Joseph Haydn, ca. 1770
- Key: C major
- Catalogue: Hob. I:48
- Composed: 1768/69
- Duration: c. 20–30 minutes
- Movements: 4
- Scoring: Orchestra

The Symphony No. 48 in C major, Hob. I:48, is a symphony by Joseph Haydn written in 1768 or 1769. The work has the nickname Maria Theresa as it was long thought to have been composed for a visit by the Holy Roman Empress, Maria Theresa of Austria in 1773. An earlier copy dated 1769 was later found, but the nickname has stuck. The symphony composed for the empress's visit was most likely No. 50.

H. C. Robbins Landon has described this symphony as a "great and indeed germinal work." It was one of the very few Haydn symphonies of this period to survive throughout the nineteenth century in various editions.

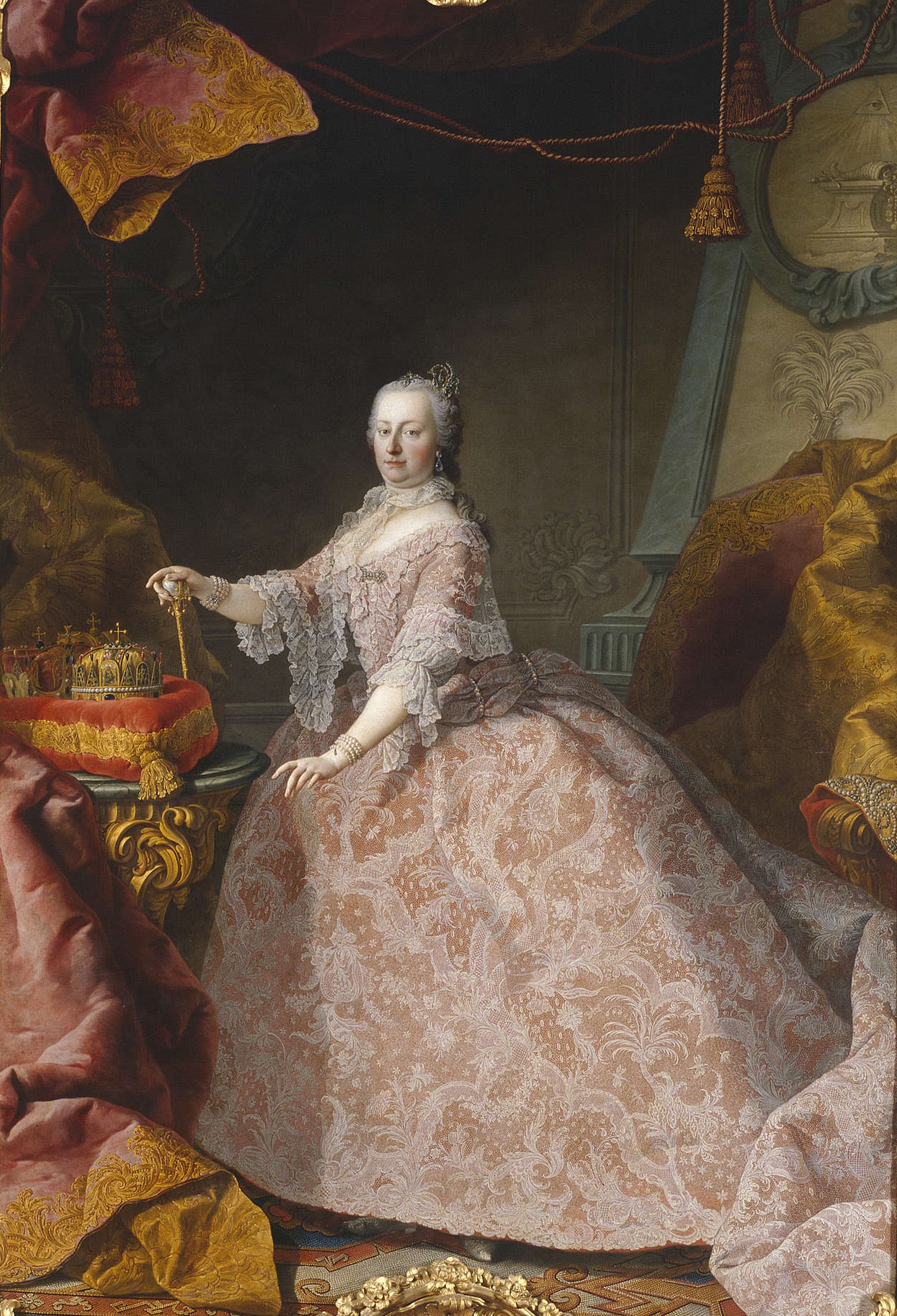
Maria Theresa of Austria, for whom the 48th Symphony is nicknamed

== Music ==
The symphony is scored for two oboes, bassoon, two horns (first, third and last movement in C alto, second movement in F), and strings. Parts for two trumpets and timpani were added later but it is uncertain whether or not these really are by Haydn. Some copies of the Eulenburg edition include two different timpani parts on the same staff, the more doubtful version differentiated by stems down and written in a facsimile of handwriting.

The work has four movements:

1. Allegro, 4/4
2. Adagio, 6/8 in F major
3. Menuet & Trio: Allegretto (Trio in C minor), 3/4
4. Finale: Allegro, 2/2

The first movement "contains a development section more complex than the minor-keyed symphonies of the same period, but not as complex as the C major Fürnberg-Morzin symphonies," and the finale has a "secondary development" in the recapitulation that compensates for the brevity of the actual development.

Haydn later quoted the opening of the first movement in his "Laudon" Symphony (No. 69).

== See also ==
- List of symphonies by name
