= Symphony No. 38 (Haydn) =

Symphony in four movements by Joseph Haydn

- Echo
- by Joseph Haydn
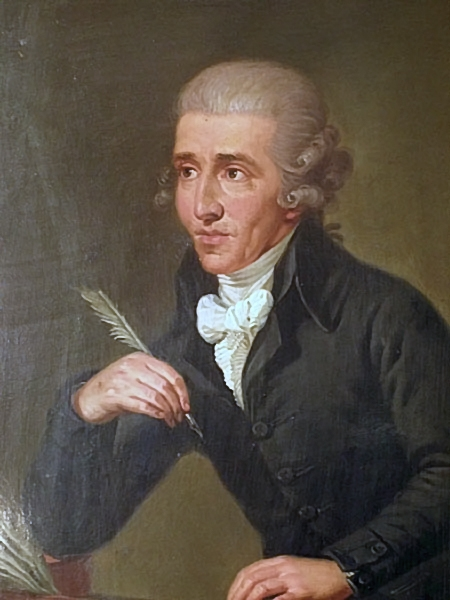
- Portrait of Joseph Haydn, ca. 1770
- Key: C major
- Catalogue: Hob. I:38
- Composed: 1765–69
- Movements: 4
- Scoring: Orchestra with continuo

The Symphony No. 38 in C major, Hoboken I/38, is an early and festive symphony by Joseph Haydn. The symphony was composed sometime between 1765 and 1769. Because of the virtuosic oboe parts in the final two movements, it has been suggested that the work's composition may have coincided with the employ of the oboist Vittorino Colombazzo in the fall of 1768. The symphony is popularly called the Echo Symphony, a nickname that, like all other named Haydn symphonies, did not originate with the composer.

== Nickname (Echo) ==
It is typically referred to as the Echo Symphony because of the use of mimicry motif (or echo) in the cadential phrasing of the second movement. The echo effect is created by scoring the leading line for unmuted first violins and the response from muted second violins.

This innovation in scoring expands upon an earlier common Baroque practice of cadential phrase-repetition.

== Music ==
The work is scored for two oboes, bassoon, two horns, trumpets, timpani and strings, with continuo.

There are four movements:

1. Allegro di molto, 2/4
2. Andante molto in F major, 3/8
3. Menuet e Trio (Trio in F major), 3/4
4. Allegro di molto, 2/2

The "Echo" slow movement is scored for strings only.

The trio of the minuet contains a virtuosic solo oboe part that spans the entire range of the instrument and contains leaps of almost two octaves.

The finale is another showpiece for the solo oboe which includes virtuosic display, notes held fermata and a spot for a cadenza. It is not in typical concerto form, but is a mixture between concerto and sonata forms.

It has been suggested that the first two movements were composed before Haydn knew of the engagement with the soloist Colombazzo as they have a completely different character than the two oboe-centric movements that round up the work.

== See also ==
- List of symphonies by name
