= The Son Also Rises =

The Son Also Rises may refer to:

- The Son Also Rises (book), a 2014 non-fiction book by Gregory Clark

== Television episodes ==
- "The Son Also Rises" (Battlestar Galactica)
- "The Son Also Rises" (Dynasty)
- "The Son Also Rises" (Grimm)
- "The Son Also Rises" (Invasion)
- "The Son Also Rises" (L.A. Law)
- "The Son Also Rises" (Minder)
- "The Son Also Rises", an episode of Tripping the Rift

== See also ==
- The Sun Also Rises (disambiguation)
