= Symphony No. 43 (Haydn) =

1771 Symphony by Joseph Haydn

- Mercury
- by Joseph Haydn
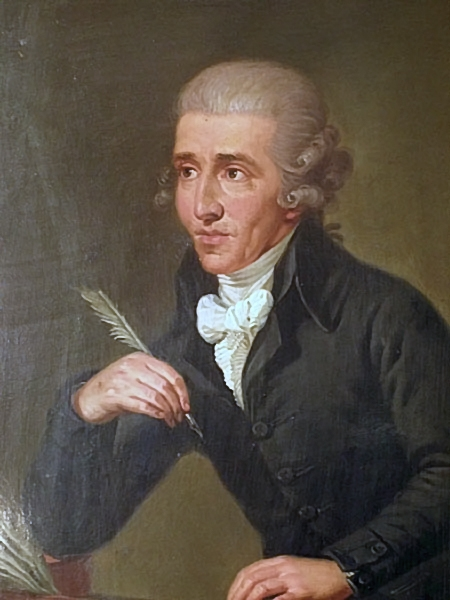
- Portrait of Joseph Haydn, ca. 1770
- Key: E♭ major
- Catalogue: Hob. I:43
- Composed: 1771
- Duration: About 25 minutes
- Movements: 4
- Scoring: Orchestra

Symphony No. 43 in E♭ major, Hob. I:43, is a symphony by Joseph Haydn, composed by 1771. It is scored for two oboes, bassoon, two horns, and strings.

Since the nineteenth century it has been referred to by the subtitle Mercury. The source of the "Mercury" nickname remains unknown according to Matthew Rye. It could refer to its use as incidental music from some play or other given at Eszterháza, or it may not have appeared until the nineteenth century. It would certainly be unnecessary to impose any programmatic elements onto the abstract musical piece, or to search for evidence of a musical portrait of the ancient Greek gods’ winged messenger.

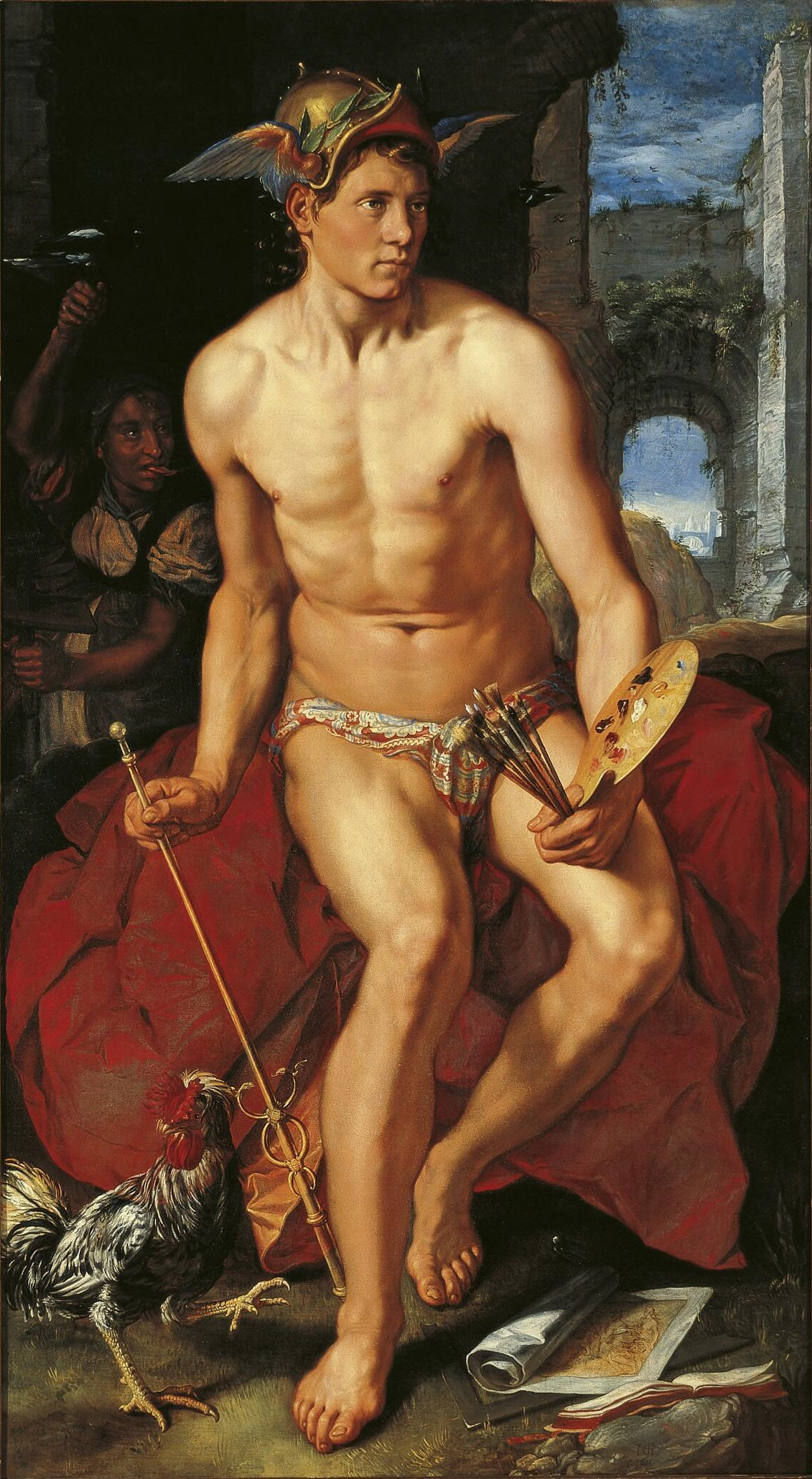
The Roman god Mercury as depicted by Hendrick Goltzius

== Music ==
H. C. Robbins Landon describes the work as "the Austrian chamber symphony par excellence". The work is in four movements:

1. Allegro, 3/4
2. Adagio in A♭ major, 2/4
3. Menuetto & Trio, 3/4
4. Allegro, 2/2

The first movement's first theme is "one of the longest of its kind that Haydn ever wrote". The movement lacks a true second subject.

The slow movement is scored for muted violins with sparing use of woodwind. Robbins Landon describes the movement as having "a strong sense of nostalgia". It is the only movement of any of Haydn's symphonies to be in the key of A♭ major.

The menuetto is "marvellously kinetic and very Austrian".

The final movement has a long coda in which "finally everything dies away except for the first violin, which goes up to an enigmatic G♭. There follows one of Haydn's magnificent silences, and then the music plunges into a last tutti and this elegant chamber symphony is at an end".

== See also ==
- List of symphonies by name
