= Stanislav Gribkov =

Russian conductor

Stanislav Gribkov (Russian: Станислав Грибков) is a Russian conductor and artistic director of the Saint Petersburg TV. In 1964 he became a teacher at the Saint Petersburg State University of Culture and Arts after graduating from the Saint Petersburg Conservatory the same year. In 1968 he began working at the Saint Petersburg TV and its radio station as well and twenty years later became choir master and artistic director at the same place. He has conducted over 500 works of various composers and was a winner of numerous international awards.
