= Webster A. Young =

American classical composer

Webster A. Young is a composer of symphonies, ballets and operas.

== Career ==
Young is the composer whose symphony performance is followed in the 2022 film 6000 Miles to Ukraine seen on many PBS stations in 2022–23. His most recent recorded CDs are The Cafe Guitar and The Best Violin Melodies of W. A. Young at Spotify and other music streaming sites. He was the most prolific composer for ballet in the US in the 1980s, before Martins/Torke, working with Eric Hyrst, formerly of the Les Grands Ballets Canadiens, New York City Ballet, and The Royal Ballet of England. Young appears with Eric Hyrst in the film Two for Ballet, available from Cinema Guild, New York. More recently he has appeared in Return to Aspen and 6000 Miles to Ukraine on Rocky Mountain PBS (2022) In 1992, Two for Ballet was seen on 63 PBS stations nationwide. The Jerome Robbins Dance Collection at Lincoln Center, New York, has an extensive file on Eric Hyrst's career that also includes videos of the first three Hyrst-Young ballets. Young was the artistic director of the Long Island Opera Company from 1998 to 2003. Young was the first composer in many decades to set Shakespeare's As You Like It to music as an opera in four acts. Soprano, tenor, and baritone operas from it are published at MusicNotes.com, and several performances are in videos at YouTube and Vimeo. Now on his Opus 212. Among his most recent works are several pieces for unaccompanied cello, published in paperback at Amazon books, as well as numerous pieces for classical guitar, six of which appear in Ballades and Airs, also at Amazon books. Other recent works include 20 tangos and 10 salsa pieces for orchestra, some also arranged for piano. Opera arias and piano music published at MusicNotes.com. Full opera orchestra scores are available at Amazon books. Young studied composition with Richard Swift, Andrew Frank, Giampaolo Bracali, and notably with Charles Jones, who was a close friend of Darius Milhaud.

== Family ==
Young is related through his grandmother, Seena Harbach Purdy, to Otto Harbach, the Broadway lyricist and playwright, who was his great uncle. Otto Harbach's oldest brother, Adolphe, Webster Young's great-grandfather, was a band conductor. Young's paternal grandfather, Owen Young, was a semi professional watercolor landscape painter, of whose works a few hundred paintings are extant. Webster Young is the author of five books, all at Amazon.com, including Berkeley-Paris Express (2017), The Palaces of Music (2012), The Little Flowers of the Desert Brothers (2017), and Music in the Church (2021).

== Works ==
=== Operas ===
- The Wrong Party (1994) (comedy)
- The Sun Also Rises (1996) (permission granted by the Hemingway estate 1995)
- Madrid (1998) (libretto based on Hemingway)
- Stocks, Bonds, and Doggerel (1999) (comedy)
- As You Like It (2000) (Libretto from Shakespeare's play)
- Orpheus (2002) (based on the myth and The Bacchae by Euripides)

=== Symphonies ===
- Symphony 1977 – "Davis to Paris"
- Symphony No. 2 1982
- Symphony No. 3 "California"
- Symphony No. 4 "Oregon"
- Symphony No. 5 "The Gold Guitar" (2014)

=== Ballets ===
All were created with Eric Hyrst, choreographer (1927–1996).

- Summer Ballet (1985) (4 act scenario by Young)
- Album (1985) (based on Commedia dell'arte by Hyrst)
- Polonaise (1986) (abstract, by Hyrst)
- Vintage (1987) (scenario by Young)
- Tango (1987) (abstract by Hyrst)
- Ballet Scenes 1987 (scenario by Hyrst)
- Waltzes (1988) (scenario by Young)
- The Judgement of Paris (1989) (based on the myth by Hyrst & Young)
- Air for Strings (1990) (abstract by Hyrst)

=== Books ===
- Music, Painting, and Jung (2012) ISBN 978-1705643471
- The Little Flowers of the Desert Brothers (2017) ISBN 978-1541335127
- The Palaces of Music (2017) ISBN 978-1987717457
- Music in the Church (2021)
