= Music Fund =

Non-profit organisation

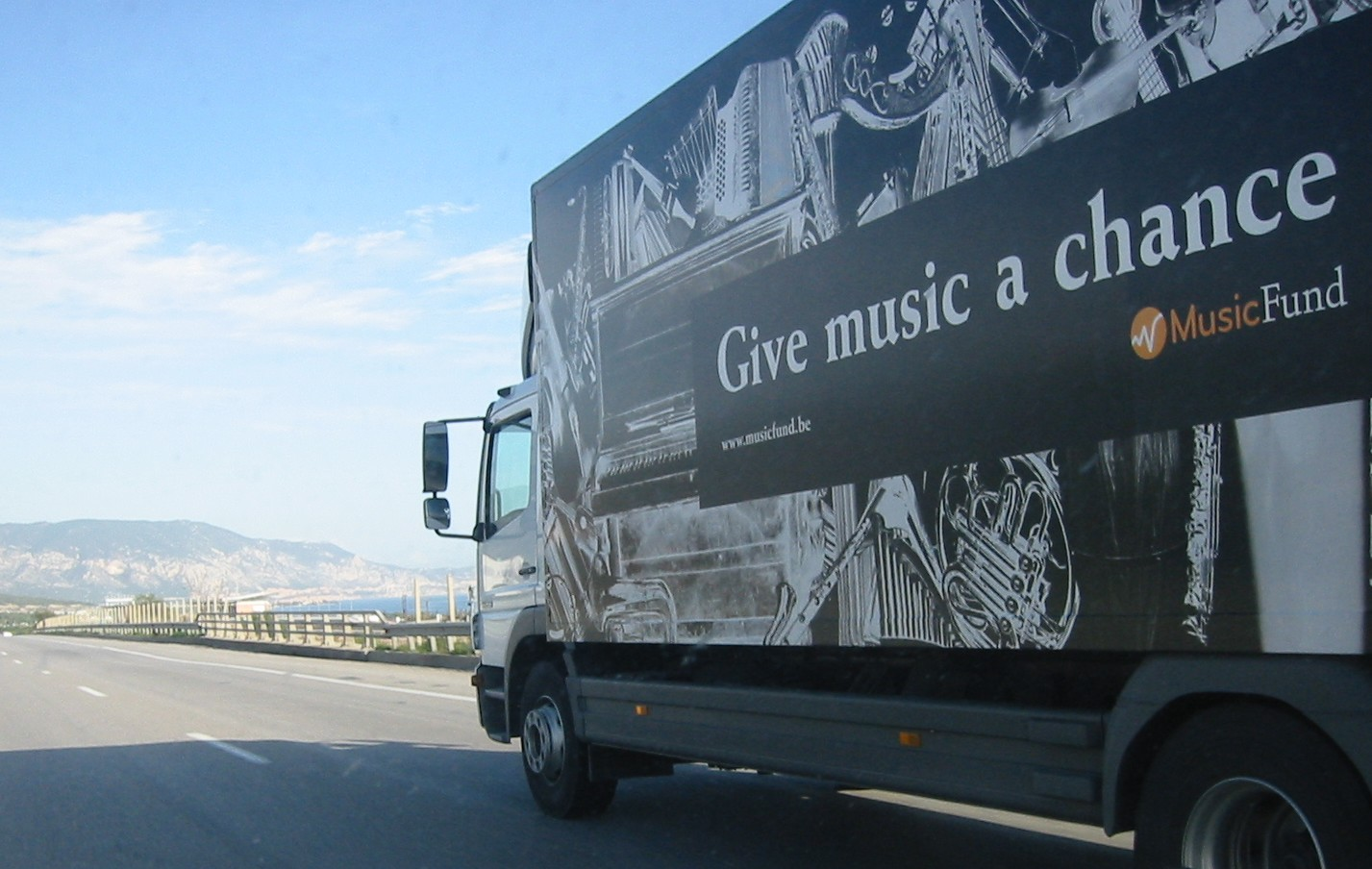
Music Fund truck on the road to deliver instruments

Music Fund, a non-profit organisation has been collecting musical instruments and organising training on instrument repair in developing countries and conflict areas since 2005.

Music Fund is the result of work between Oxfam Solidarity Belgium, and the Ictus Ensemble.

The first collection of instruments took place in 2005, one year after the creation of Music Fund, and more than 500 instruments of all kinds were collected. Several months later, in December 2005, the first shipment was organised and the instruments were transported to Palestine and Israel. This operation was a huge success, following which it was decided to do it again, this time to Congo (Kinshasa) and Mozambique (Maputo).

Some training is provided locally, within the partner schools, through training sessions or workshops. Some students obtain a grant and are then sent for a lengthy period in a specialised school, where they follow an internship in the workshops of experts affiliated with Music Fund in Europe.
