= The Sun Also Rises (opera) =

2020 opera by Webster A. Young

The Sun Also Rises is a one-act opera by Webster A. Young, based on Ernest Hemingway's 1926 novel The Sun Also Rises. It is one of a pair of Hemingway works that Young adapted into operas. The opera's libretto is by the composer, and includes direct quotations from the novel. It premiered on May 7, 2000, at the Long Island Opera.
