= List of classical music sub-titles, nicknames and non-numeric titles =

This is an alphabetically ordered list of sub-titles, nicknames and non-numeric titles that have been applied to classical music compositions of types that are normally identified only by some combination of number, key and catalogue number. These types of compositions include: symphony, concerto, sonata, and standard chamber music combinations (strings trio, quartet, quintet, sextet, etc.; piano trio, quartet, quintet, sextet, etc.), among others.

A sub-title is a subsidiary name given to a work by the composer, and considered part of its formal title, such as:

- The Age of Anxiety, the sub-title of Bernstein's Symphony No. 2
- Pathétique, the sub-title of Tchaikovsky's Symphony No. 6 in B minor, Op. 74.

A nickname is a name that is not part of the title given by the composer, but has come to be popularly associated with the work, such as:

- Emperor, the nickname of Beethoven's Piano Concerto No. 5 in E♭ major, Op. 73
- Jupiter, the nickname of Mozart's Symphony No. 41 in C major, K. 551.

A non-numeric title is a formal title that departs from the usual sequential numbering of works of the same type, such as:

- Symphonie fantastique by Berlioz and
- Warsaw Concerto by Addinsell.

== Background ==
Many classical compositions belong to a numbered series of works of a similar type by the same composer. For example, Beethoven wrote 9 symphonies, 10 violin sonatas, 32 piano sonatas, 5 piano concertos, 16 string quartets, 7 piano trios and other works, all of which are numbered sequentially within their genres and generally referred to by their sequence numbers, keys and opus numbers. For example, the 6th of his violin sonatas is referred to as: Violin Sonata No. 6 in A major, Op. 30, No. 1.

However, some of these works were also given descriptive sub-titles by Beethoven himself: for example, he sub-titled the 3rd Symphony "Eroica", and the 6th Symphony "Pastoral".

Others were given nicknames by publishers or others: for example, the Piano Sonata No. 14 is called "Moonlight" and the Piano Trio No. 7 is known as the "Archduke".

In other cases, a composer gives a work a title without any number, even though he may have written other works of that type with numbers. For example, Tchaikovsky wrote 6 numbered symphonies, but he also wrote the unnumbered Manfred Symphony between the 4th and 5th symphonies. A listing of all Tchaikovsky's symphonies would be incomplete without mention of the Manfred Symphony.

=== Special cases ===
Works such as Vaughan Williams's first three symphonies (A Sea Symphony, A London Symphony and A Pastoral Symphony) fit into more than one camp. These are true titles, as Vaughan Williams commenced the numbering of his symphonies only from his 4th Symphony. The first three symphonies were, however, retrospectively given numbers by cataloguers. Hence, A Sea Symphony, for example, is often referred to as his "Symphony No. 1", with the original title being relegated to a sub-title, although that was never Vaughan Williams's own intention or practice.

=== Other named works excluded ===
There are vast numbers of other named compositions that do not qualify for this list. Symphonic poems, concert overtures, suites, variations, operas, ballets, most vocal and choral music, and miscellaneous other works are normally given titles that exclude numbers. Examples of such works would include:

- Thus Spoke Zarathustra, symphonic poem by Richard Strauss
- Tragic Overture by Brahms
- Schelomo, Hebraic rhapsody by Bloch
- The Planets, Suite by Holst
- Sea Pictures, song cycle by Elgar
- Messiah, oratorio by Handel
- La bohème, opera by Puccini
- Carnaval, a set of piano pieces by Schumann

== A ==
- A: Joseph Haydn, Symphony No. 107 in B♭ major, Hob. I/107
- Adagio:
  - Karl Amadeus Hartmann, Symphony No. 2
  - Krzysztof Penderecki, Symphony No. 4
- Adélaïde: Marius Casadesus (attrib. Wolfgang Amadeus Mozart), Violin Concerto in D
- L'Adieu: Frédéric Chopin, Waltz No. 9 in A♭ major, Op. posth. 69/1
- Adieu: the second of Karlheinz Stockhausen's three unnumbered wind quintets
- Aeolian Harp: Frédéric Chopin, Étude in A♭, Op. 25/1
- Afro-American: William Grant Still, Symphony No. 1
- Age of Anxiety: Leonard Bernstein, Symphony No. 2
- Agiochook: Alan Hovhaness, Symphony No. 64, Op. 422
- Air Russe: Franz Schubert, Moment musical No. 3 in F minor, D. 780/3
- Albinoni's Adagio: Remo Giazotto, Adagio in G minor
- All Men are Brothers: Alan Hovhaness, Symphony No. 11, Op. 186
- Alla Marcia: Boris Tishchenko, Concerto Alla Marcia for sixteen soloists
- Alla Veneziana: Arthur Butterworth, Trumpet Concerto, Op. 93
- L'Allegro ed il Penseroso: Charles Villiers Stanford, Symphony No. 5, Op. 56
- Alleluia: Joseph Haydn, Symphony No. 30 in C major, Hob. I/30
- Alpine: Richard Strauss, Symphony No. 4 in A major
- American:
  - American Quartet – Antonín Dvořák, String Quartet No. 12 in F major, Op. 96
  - American Quintet – Antonín Dvořák, String Quintet No. 3 in E♭ major, Op. 97
  - American Suite - Antonín Dvořák, Suite in A major, Op. 98b
  - American Symphony, An - Don Gillis, Symphony No. 1
- Angel of Light: Einojuhani Rautavaara, Symphony No. 7
- Ani: Alan Hovhaness, Symphony No. 23, Op. 249
- Antar: Nikolai Rimsky-Korsakov, Symphony No. 2 (later renamed symphonic suite)
- Antarctic Symphony: Peter Maxwell Davies, Symphony No. 8: Antarctic Symphony
- Antartica: Ralph Vaughan Williams, Symphony No. 7 Sinfonia Antartica
- Antígona: Carlos Chávez, Symphony No. 1 Sinfonía de Antígona
- Antique:
  - Friedrich Witt attrib., Symphonie antique
  - Charles-Marie Widor, Symphonie Antique, Op. 83
- Antretter: Wolfgang Amadeus Mozart, Serenade No. 3 in D major, K. 185
- Apocalyptic: Anton Bruckner, Symphony No. 8 in C minor
- Appalachian Mountains, To the: Alan Hovhaness, Symphony No. 60, Op. 396
- Appassionata: Ludwig van Beethoven, Piano Sonata No. 23 in F minor, Op. 57
- Apponyi: Joseph Haydn, String Quartets, Opp. 71, 74
- Aquerò: Malcolm Williamson, Symphony No. 5
- Arabescata: Einojuhani Rautavaara, Symphony No. 4
- Ararat: Alan Hovhaness, Symphony No. 14, Op. 194
- Archduke: Ludwig van Beethoven, Piano Trio No. 7 in B♭ major, Op. 97
- Ardent Song: Alan Hovhaness, Symphony No. 13, Op. 190
- Arjuna: Alan Hovhaness, Symphony No. 8, Op. 179
- Arthurus Rex: William T. Blows, Symphony No. 10
- Artstakh: Alan Hovhaness, Symphony No. 65, Op. 427
- Ascension (Ascenção): Heitor Villa-Lobos, Symphony No. 2
- Atlantis: Jānis Ivanovs, Symphony No. 4
- Autumn (Efterår): Peter Lange-Müller, Symphony No. 1 in D minor, Op. 17
- L'autunno: Antonio Vivaldi, from Le quattro stagioni, Violin Concerto RV 293, Op. 8 L'estro armonico third concerto (from The Four Seasons: The Autumn)
- Aviation: Nikolai Myaskovsky, Symphony No. 16 in F major Op. 39

== B ==
- B: Joseph Haydn, Symphony No. 108 in B♭ major, Hob. I/108
- Babi Yar: Dmitri Shostakovich, Symphony No. 13 in B♭ minor, Op. 113
- Battle (and variants):
  - Wolfgang Amadeus Mozart, Contredanse in C, K. 535, La Bataille
  - Ludwig van Beethoven, Battle Symphony
- Bear: Joseph Haydn, Symphony No. 82 in C major, Hob. I/82
- Bee's Wedding: Felix Mendelssohn, Song without Words in C major, Op. 67/4
- Beethoven's Tenth: Johannes Brahms, Symphony No. 1 in C minor, Op. 68
- Bell:
  - Sergei Rachmaninoff, Choral Symphony The Bells, Op. 35
  - Aram Khachaturian, Symphony No. 2, The Bell
- The Bells of Zlonice: Antonín Dvořák, Symphony No. 1 in C minor, Op. 3
- Big Apple: Johan de Meij, Symphony No. 2
- Bird Quartet: Joseph Haydn, String Quartet, Opus 33 No. 3
- Black Key: Frédéric Chopin, Etude in G♭, Op. 10/5
- Black Mass: Alexander Scriabin, Piano Sonata No. 9, Op. 68
- Boreale: Vagn Holmboe, Symphony No. 8, Boreale, Sinfonia
- Borealis: Arthur Butterworth, Symphony No. 3, Op. 52, Sinfonia Borealis
- Boreas: David del Puerto, Symphony No. 1
- Brasília:
  - César Guerra-Peixe, Symphony No. 2, Brasilia
  - Cláudio Santoro, Symphony No. 7, Sinfonia Brasilia
- Breve/Brevis:
  - Havergal Brian, Symphony No. 22, Symphonia Brevis
  - Vincent d'Indy, Symphony No. 3, Sinfonia Brevis de bello Gallico
  - Gösta Nystroem, Symphony No. 1, Sinfonia Breve
- Broken Wings: Alan Hovhaness, Symphony No. 32, Op. 296
- Butterfly: Frédéric Chopin, Etude in G♭, Op. 25/9

== C ==
- Cambridge: Hubert Parry, Symphony No. 2
- The Camp Meeting: Charles Ives, Symphony No. 3
- Capricieuse: Franz Berwald, Symphony No. 2
- Cat's Fugue: Domenico Scarlatti, Keyboard Sonata in G minor, Kk. 30
- St Cecilia: George Frideric Handel, Concerto Grosso in D major, HWV 323, St Cecilia's Concerto
- Celestial Gate: Alan Hovhaness, Symphony No. 6, Op. 173
- Cévenole: Vincent d'Indy, Symphonie Cévenole ("Cévennes Symphony"), a.k.a. Symphonie sur un chant montagnard français ("Symphony on a French Mountain Air")
- La chasse: Joseph Haydn, Symphony No. 73 in D major, Hob. I/73
- Children in the Streets: Thomas Koppel, Symphony for Children in the Streets (Symfoni for gadens børn)
- Children's Games: Peter Maxwell Davies, Naxos String Quartet No. 4
- Choral:
  - Ludwig van Beethoven, Symphony No. 9 in D minor, Op. 125
  - Philip Glass, Symphony No. 5
  - Alan Hovhaness, Symphony No. 12, Op. 188
- Chord: Frédéric Chopin, Prelude No. 20 in C minor, Op. 28/20
- Christmas:
  - Alan Hovhaness, Symphony No. 49, Op. 356
  - Krzysztof Penderecki, Symphony No. 2
- Circe: Alan Hovhaness, Symphony No. 18, Op. 204a
- City of Light: Alan Hovhaness, Symphony No. 22, Op. 236
- Classical: Sergei Prokofiev, Symphony No. 1 in D major, Op. 25
- Clock: Joseph Haydn, Symphony No. 101 in D major, Hob. I/101
- Cold Mountain: Alan Hovhaness, Symphony No. 57, Op. 381
- Colloredo: Wolfgang Amadeus Mozart, Serenade No. 4 in D major, K. 203
- Colour: Arthur Bliss, A Colour Symphony
- Comica: Felix Draeseke, Symphony No. 4 in E minor Symphonia Comica, WoO 38
- Concerto funebre: Karl Amadeus Hartmann, Concerto for violin and string orchestra
- Concerto without Orchestra: Robert Schumann, Piano Sonata No. 3 in F minor, Op. 14
- Concord: Charles Ives, Piano Sonata No. 2
- Connecticut: Henry Kimball Hadley, Symphony No. 5 in C minor, Op. 140
- Copernican: Henryk Górecki, Symphony No. 2, Op. 31
- Coronation: Wolfgang Amadeus Mozart, Piano Concerto No. 26 in D major, K. 537
- Creation: William Wallace, Creation Symphony
- The Cuckoo and the Nightingale: George Frideric Handel, Organ Concerto in F, HWV 295

== D ==
- Dance: Don Gillis, Symphony No. 8, A Dance Symphony
- Dante: Franz Liszt, Symphony No. 2 in D minor (full name: A symphony to Dante's "Divina Commedia")
- Death and the Maiden: Franz Schubert, String Quartet No. 14 in D minor, D. 810
- Defiance: Leoš Janáček, Capriccio for piano left-hand and chamber ensemble
- Deidre: Rutland Boughton, Symphony No. 2 (1926-7)
- Deliciae basiliensis: Arthur Honegger, Symphony No. 4
- Deutsche: Hanns Eisler, Deutsche Sinfonie
- Deux mondes: Pierre Kaelin, Symphonie des deux mondes (Symphony of the Two Worlds)
- Devil's Trill: Giuseppe Tartini, Violin Sonata in G minor
- Di tre re: Arthur Honegger, Symphony No. 5
- Dissonance: Wolfgang Amadeus Mozart, String Quartet No. 19 in C major, K. 465
- Il distratto: Joseph Haydn, Symphony No. 60 in C major, Hob. I/60
- The Divine Poem: Alexander Scriabin, Symphony No. 3 in C minor, Op. 43
- Dollar: Kurt Atterberg, Symphony No. 6
- Domestica: Richard Strauss, Symphony No. 3 in D minor
- Donnerwetter: Wolfgang Amadeus Mozart, Contredanse in D, K. 534
- Dramatic: Anton Rubinstein, Symphony No. 4 in D minor, Op. 95
- Drum: Frédéric Chopin, Polonaise in A♭ major, Op. 53
- Drumroll: Joseph Haydn, Symphony No. 103 in E♭ major, Hob. I/103
- Duetto: Felix Mendelssohn, Song without Words in A♭ major, Op. 38/6
- Dumky: Antonín Dvořák, Piano Trio No. 4 in E minor, Op. 90

== E ==
- Earthquake: Anatol Vieru: Symphony No. 3
- Echo: Joseph Haydn, Symphony No. 38
- Efterår (Autumn): Peter Lange-Müller, Symphony No. 1 in D minor, Op. 17
- Egyptian: Camille Saint-Saëns, Piano Concerto No. 5 in F major, Op. 103
- Eine kleine Nachtmusik: Wolfgang Amadeus Mozart, Serenade No. 13 in G major, K. 525, Eine kleine Nachtmusik (A Little Night Music)
- Elegiac: Charles Villiers Stanford, Symphony No. 2 in D minor
- Elevamini: Malcolm Williamson, Symphony No. 1
- Elvira Madigan: Wolfgang Amadeus Mozart, Piano Concerto No. 21 in C major, K. 467
- Emerson: Charles Ives, Piano Sonata No. 2 (first draft as a concerto)
- Emperor: Ludwig van Beethoven, Piano Concerto No. 5 in E♭ major, Op. 73
- En la melancolía de tu recuerdo, Soria: David del Puerto, Symphony No. 3
- Energica: Jānis Ivanovs, Symphony No. 12 in C major, Sinfonia Energica
- English: Hubert Parry, Symphony No. 3
- Enigma: Edward Elgar, Enigma Variations, Op. 36 (Note: The formal title is Variations on an Original Theme for orchestra, with "Enigma" being a sub-title)
- Erdödy: Joseph Haydn, String Quartets, Op. 76
- Eroica: Ludwig van Beethoven, Symphony No. 3 in E♭ major, Op. 55
- Espagnole: Édouard Lalo, Symphonie espagnole in D minor, Op. 21 (actually a violin concerto)
- Espansiva: Carl Nielsen, Symphony No. 3, Sinfonia Espansiva, Op. 27
- L'estate: Antonio Vivaldi, from Le quattro stagioni, Violin Concerto RV 315, Op. 8 L'estro armonico second concerto (from The Four Seasons: The summer)
- Etchmiadzin: Alan Hovhaness, Symphony No. 21, Op. 234
- Exile: Alan Hovhaness, Symphony No. 1, Op. 17/2
- Exodus: Anatol Vieru: Symphony No. 6

== F ==
- Faith: Don Gillis, Symphony No. 2, Symphony of Faith
- Fantaisie: Franz Schubert, Piano Sonata No. 18 in G major, D. 894
- Fantaisies Symphoniques: Bohuslav Martinů, Symphony No. 6
- Fantastique: Hector Berlioz, Symphonie fantastique
- Farewell: Joseph Haydn, Symphony No. 45
- The Fate of a Man: Jivan Gurgeni Ter-T'at'evosian, Symphony No. 2, The Fate of a Man (Sud'ba cheloveka)
- Faust: Franz Liszt, Symphony No. 1 in C minor
- Feuer (Fire): Joseph Haydn, Symphony No. 59 in A major
- Fire (Feuer): Joseph Haydn, Symphony No. 59 in A major
- The First of May: Dmitri Shostakovich, Symphony No. 3 in E♭, Op. 20
- Fishermen of Loch Neagh: Charles Villiers Stanford, Irish Rhapsody for orchestra No. 4 in A minor, Op. 141
- Folksong:
  - Roy Harris, Symphony No. 4
  - Felix Mendelssohn, Song without Words in A♭ major, Op. 53/5
- The Four Seasons:
  - Antonio Vivaldi first four (violin) concertos from Op. 8 L'estro armonico
  - Henry Kimball Hadley, Symphony No. 2 in F minor, Op. 30, 1899
- The Four Temperaments: Carl Nielsen, Symphony No. 2, Op. 16
- Free Men: Don Gillis, Symphony No. 3, A Symphony for Free Men
- French: Boris Tishchenko, A French Symphony
- French Mountain Air: Vincent d'Indy, Symphonie Cévenole ("Cévennes Symphony"), a.k.a. Symphonie sur un chant montagnard français (Symphony on a French Mountain Air)
- From My Life: Bedřich Smetana, String Quartet No. 1 in E minor
- From the New World: Antonín Dvořák, Symphony No. 9 in E minor, Op. 95
- From the Street: Leoš Janáček, Piano Sonata (also known as 1. X. 1905)
- From the Welsh Hills: Rutland Boughton, String Quartet in G (1923)
- Fun: Don Gillis, Symphony No. 5½, A Symphony for Fun
- Funèbre et triomphale: Hector Berlioz, Grande symphonie funèbre et triomphale
- Funeral March:
  - Frédéric Chopin, Piano Sonata No. 2 in B♭ minor, Op. 35
  - Felix Mendelssohn, Song without Words in E minor, Op. 62/3
- Für Elise: Ludwig van Beethoven, Bagatelle No. 25 in A minor

== G ==
- Gaelic: Amy Beach Symphony in E minor, Op. 32
- Il gardellino: Antonio Vivaldi Flute Concerto RV 428 (The Goldfinch);
- Gasteiner: Franz Schubert, Piano Sonata No. 17 in D major, D. 850
- Gettysburg: Roy Harris, Symphony No. 6
- Ghost: Ludwig van Beethoven, Piano Trios No. 5 in D major, Op. 70/1
- Gothic:
  - Havergal Brian, Symphony No. 1 in D minor
  - Charles-Marie Widor, Symphony for Organ No. 9
- Il Gran Mogul concerto Violin Concerto RV 431a (The Grand Moghul));
- Gran Partita: Wolfgang Amadeus Mozart, Serenade No. 10 in B♭ major, K. 361
- Grand Duo: Franz Schubert, Sonata in C major for piano 4-hands, D. 812
- Great C major: Franz Schubert, Symphony No. 9 in C major, D. 944
- Great G minor: Wolfgang Amadeus Mozart, Symphony No. 40 in G minor, K. 550
- Greek: Rutland Boughton, String Quartet in A (1923)
- Green Mountains, To the: Alan Hovhaness, Symphony No. 46, Op. 347
- A Guerra (The War): Heitor Villa-Lobos, Symphony No. 3

== H ==
- Haffner:
  - Wolfgang Amadeus Mozart:
    - Serenade No. 7 in D major, K. 250
    - Symphony No. 35 in D major, K. 385
- Hammerklavier: Ludwig van Beethoven, Piano Sonata No. 29 in B♭ major, Op. 106
- The Harmonious Blacksmith: George Frideric Handel, first movement of Suite No. 5 in E major, HWV 430
- Harold in Italy: Hector Berlioz, Harold en Italie (Symphony for viola and orchestra)
- Harp: Ludwig van Beethoven, String Quartet No. 10 in E♭ major, Op. 74
- Helicopter String Quartet: Karlheinz Stockhausen
- Hen: Joseph Haydn, Symphony No. 83 in G minor, Hob. I/83
- Heroes: Philip Glass, Symphony No. 4
- Heroic (see also Eroica):
  - Frédéric Chopin, Polonaise in A♭ major, Op. 53
  - Eduard Tubin, Symphony No. 3
- Héroïde-élégiaque: Franz Liszt, Hungarian Rhapsody No. 5, S. 244/5
- Hoffmeister: Wolfgang Amadeus Mozart, String Quartet No. 20 in D major, K. 499
- Hoffnung: a string trio by Karlheinz Stockhausen, the "ninth hour" of his Klang cycle
- Holidays: Charles Ives, Holidays Symphony (A Symphony: New England Holidays)
- Hornsignal: Joseph Haydn, Symphony No. 31 in D major
- Humana: Jānis Ivanovs, Symphony No. 13, Symphonia Humana
- Hunt:
  - Wolfgang Amadeus Mozart, String Quartet No. 17 in B♭ major, K. 458
  - Wolfgang Amadeus Mozart, Piano Sonata No. 18 in D major, K. 576
  - Ludwig van Beethoven, Piano Sonata No. 18 in E♭ major, Op. 31, No. 3
- Hunting Song: Felix Mendelssohn, Song without Words in A major, Op. 19/3
- Hydriotaphia: William Alwyn, Symphony No. 5
- Hymn to Glacier Peak: Alan Hovhaness, Symphony No. 66, Op. 428
- Hymn to the Mountains: Alan Hovhaness, Symphony No. 67, Op. 429
- Hymn of Praise (Lobgesang): Felix Mendelssohn (posthumously named Symphony No. 2 in B♭ major), Op. 52

== I ==
- The Icy Mirror: Malcolm Williamson, Symphony No. 3
- L'impériale: Joseph Haydn, Symphony No. 53 in D major, Hob. I/53
- O Imprevisto (The Unforeseen): Heitor Villa-Lobos, Symphony No. 1
- In Memoriam:
  - In Memoriam - Don Gillis, Symphony No. 5
  - In Memoriam - Arthur Sullivan, Overture in C, "In Memoriam"
  - In Memoriam G. F. Watts - Charles Villiers Stanford, Symphony No. 6 in E♭ major, Op. 94
- In nomine Domini: Joseph Haydn, Symphony No. 84 in E♭ major, Hob. I/84
- In the Steppes of Central Asia: Alexander Borodin, Musical Picture: In Central Asia
- India: Carlos Chávez, Symphony No. 2, Sinfonia india
- Inextinguishable: Carl Nielsen, Symphony No. 4, Op. 29
- Intimate Letters: Leoš Janáček, String Quartet No. 2
- L'inverno: Antonio Vivaldi, from Le quattro stagioni, Violin Concerto RV 297, Op. 8 L'estro armonico fourth concerto (from The Four Seasons: The Winter)
- Ipsa: Jānis Ivanovs, Symphony No. 15, Sinfonia Ipsa
- Irish:
  - Charles Villiers Stanford, Symphony No. 3 in F minor, Op. 28
  - Arthur Sullivan: Symphony in E
- Iron and Steel: Sergei Prokofiev, Symphony No. 2 in D minor, Op. 40
- Italian/Italienne:
  - Italian - Felix Mendelssohn, Symphony No. 4 in A major, Op. 90
  - Italienne - Vincent d'Indy, Symphony No. 1 (never published)

== J ==
- Janiculum: Vincent Persichetti, Symphony No. 9, Sinfonia Janiculum
- Jealousy: Leoš Janáček, discarded overture to Jenůfa
- Jena: Friedrich Witt, Jena Symphony
- Jeremiah:
  - Leonard Bernstein, Symphony No. 1
  - Bertold Hummel, Symphony No. 3, Op. 100
- Jeunehomme: Wolfgang Amadeus Mozart, Piano Concerto No. 9 in E♭ major, K. 271
- Joke: Joseph Haydn, String Quartet in E♭ major, Op. 33, No. 2
- Journey:
  - The Journey - Einojuhani Rautavaara, Symphony No. 8
  - Journey to Vega - Alan Hovhaness, Symphony No. 52, Op. 372
  - Journey without Distance - Richard Danielpour, Symphony No. 3
- Jubilee: Malcolm Williamson, Symphony No. 4
- Jupiter: Wolfgang Amadeus Mozart, Symphony No. 41 in C major, K. 551

== K ==
- Kaddish: Leonard Bernstein, Symphony No. 3
- Kayagum: Alan Hovhaness, Symphony No. 16, Op. 202
- Kegelstatt: Wolfgang Amadeus Mozart, Trio for Clarinet, Viola and Piano in E♭ major, K. 498
- Kinderstück: Felix Mendelssohn, Song without Words in A major, Op. 102/5
- Klagegesang: Karl Amadeus Hartmann, Symphony (1944), later reworked as part of Symphony No. 3
- Kleetüden: Jason Wright Wingate, Symphony No. 2, Kleetüden
- Korean: Krzysztof Penderecki, Symphony No. 5
- Kreutzer:
  - Kreutzer - Ludwig van Beethoven, Violin Sonata No. 9 in A major, Op. 47
  - Kreutzer Sonata - Leoš Janáček, String Quartet No. 1 (not named directly after Beethoven's composition, but after the novella The Kreutzer Sonata by Leo Tolstoy, which was in turn inspired by Beethoven)

== L ==
- Lambach: attrib. Wolfgang Amadeus Mozart, Symphony in G major, K. Anh 221 (K. 45a) (c. 1766. Generally believed to be Leopold Mozart's work)
- Lament for the Son of Ossian: Charles Villiers Stanford, Irish Rhapsody for orchestra No. 2 in F minor, Op. 84
- Lamentatione: Joseph Haydn, Symphony No. 26 in D minor, Hob. I/26
- Lark: Joseph Haydn, Quartet No. 53 in D major, Op. 64, No. 5, FHE No. 35, Hoboken No. III:63
- Last: Franz Schubert, Symphony No. 10 in D major, D. 936a
- Latgalian: Jānis Ivanovs, Symphony No. 6
- Laudon: Joseph Haydn, Symphony No. 69 in C major, Hob. I/69
- La Madre De Los Gatos: Brian Beck
- Lebensstürme: Franz Schubert, Duo in A minor for piano 4-hands, D. 947
- Legendary: Eduard Tubin, Symphony No. 2
- Leningrad:
  - Charles Camilleri, Piano Concerto No. 3 (1986)
  - Dmitri Shostakovich, Symphony No. 7 in C major, Op. 60
- Letter V: Joseph Haydn, Symphony No. 88 in G major, Hob. I/88
- Das Lied von der Erde (The Song of the Earth): Gustav Mahler, Das Lied von der Erde (a symphony in the guise of a song cycle)
- Lieder der Vergänglichkeit (Songs of Transience): Krzysztof Penderecki, Symphony No. 8
- Linz: Wolfgang Amadeus Mozart, Symphony No. 36 in C major, K. 425
- Little C major: Franz Schubert, Symphony No. 6 in C major, D. 589
- Little G minor: Wolfgang Amadeus Mozart, Symphony No. 25 in G minor, K. 183/173 dB
- A Little Night Music: Wolfgang Amadeus Mozart, Serenade No. 13 in G major, Eine kleine Nachtmusik, K. 525
- Little Russian: Pyotr Ilyich Tchaikovsky, Symphony No. 2 in C minor, Op. 17
- Liturgical/Liturgique/Liturgy:
  - Liturgical - Vincent Persichetti, Symphony No. 7
  - Liturgique - Arthur Honegger, Symphony No. 3, H. 186
  - Liturgy of Homage to the Australian Broadcasting Commission in its Fiftieth Year as University to the Australian Nation - Malcolm Williamson, Symphony No. 6
- Lobgesang (Hymn of Praise): Felix Mendelssohn (posthumously named Symphony No. 2 in B♭ major), Op. 52
- Lobkowitz: Joseph Haydn, String Quartets, Op. 77
- Lodi: Wolfgang Amadeus Mozart, String Quartet No. 1 in G major, K. 80/73f
- London:
  - London - Joseph Haydn, Symphony No. 104 in D major, Hob. I/104
  - A London Symphony - Ralph Vaughan Williams, Symphony No. 2
- Loon Lake: Alan Hovhaness, Symphony No. 63, Op. 411
- The Lord of the Rings: Johan de Meij, Symphony No. 1
- Los Angeles: Arvo Pärt, Symphony No. 4
- Low: Philip Glass, Symphony No. 1
- Lützow: Wolfgang Amadeus Mozart, Piano Concerto No. 8 in C major, K. 246
- Lyrical: Eduard Tubin, Symphony No. 4

== M ==
- Madigan, Elvira: Wolfgang Amadeus Mozart, Piano Concerto No. 21 in C major, K. 467
- Majnun: Alan Hovhaness, Symphony No. 24, Op. 273
- Manfred: Pyotr Ilyich Tchaikovsky, Symphony No. 7 in B minor, Op. 58
- Maqam: Charles Camilleri, Piano Concerto No. 2 (1967–68)
- Maria Theresa: Joseph Haydn, Symphony No. 48 in C major, Hob. I/48
- Mathis der Maler: Paul Hindemith, Symphony: Mathis der Maler
- Le matin: Joseph Haydn, Symphony No. 6 in D major, Hob. I/6
- Mediterranean: Charles Camilleri, Piano Concerto No. 1 (1948, rev. 1978)
- Melancolía de tu recuerdo, Soria, En la: David del Puerto, Symphony No. 3
- Memoriam, In: see In Memoriam
- Mercury: Joseph Haydn, Symphony No. 43 in E♭ major, Hob. I/43
- Metal Orchestra: Alan Hovhaness, Symphony No. 17, Op. 203, Symphony for Metal Orchestra
- Metropolis: Michael Daugherty, Metropolis Symphony
- Le midi: Joseph Haydn, Symphony No. 7 in C major, Hob. I/7
- Midsummer Vigil: Hugo Alfven, Swedish Rhapsody No. 1 in D major Op. 19
- Military:
  - Frédéric Chopin, Polonaise in A major, Op. 40/1
  - Joseph Haydn, Symphony No. 100 in G major, Hob. I/100
- Minute: Frédéric Chopin, Waltz No. 6 in D♭, Op. 64/1
- Miracle: Joseph Haydn, Symphony No. 96 in D major, Hob. I/96
- Miserae: Karl Amadeus Hartmann, Symphony No. 1 (later retitled simply 'Symphonic Poem')
- Missions of California: Meredith Willson, Symphony No. 2 in E minor
- Moonlight: Ludwig van Beethoven, Piano Sonata No. 14 in C♯ minor, Op. 27
- Mount St. Helens: Alan Hovhaness, Symphony No. 50, Op. 360
- The Mountains of Brasil (Montanhas do Brasil): Heitor Villa-Lobos, Symphony No. 6
- Mountains and Rivers Without End: Alan Hovhaness, Chamber Symphony for 10 Players, Op. 225
- Mozartiana: Pyotr Ilyich Tchaikovsky, Orchestral Suite No. 4, Op. 61
- A Musical Joke: Wolfgang Amadeus Mozart, Divertimento for two horns and strings, K. 522
- Mysterious Mountain: Alan Hovhaness, Symphony No. 2, Op. 132

== N ==
- Naïve: Franz Berwald, Symphony No. 4 in E♭ major
- Nanga Parvat: Alan Hovhaness, Symphony No. 7, Op. 178
- Naxos Quartets: Peter Maxwell Davies, a set of ten string quartets
- New England Holidays: Charles Ives, Holidays Symphony (A Symphony: New England Holidays)
- New World: Antonín Dvořák, Symphony No. 9 in E minor, From the New World, Op. 95
- New York: Johan de Meij, Symphony No. 2, A New York Symphony
- Nomine Domini, In: Joseph Haydn, Symphony No. 84 in E♭ major, Hob. I/84
- Nordic: Howard Hanson, Symphony No. 1
- North, East, South, West: Henry Kimball Hadley, Symphony No. 4 in D minor, Op. 64
- Norwich: Edward German, Symphony No. 2 in A minor
- La notte: Antonio Vivaldi, Bassoon Concerto RV 501 (The Night)
- Nottingham: Alan Bush, Symphony No 2, Op.33, A Nottingham Symphony
- Die Nullte: Anton Bruckner, Symphony No. 0 in D minor
- Nusantara: David del Puerto, Symphony No. 2

== O ==
- Ocean: Anton Rubinstein, Symphony No. 2 in C major, Op. 42
- Ocean Etude: Frédéric Chopin, Etude Op 25 #12
- To October: Dmitri Shostakovich, Symphony No. 2 in B major, Op. 14
- Ode to Silence: Anatol Vieru: Symphony No. 1
- Odense: attrib. Wolfgang Amadeus Mozart, Symphony in A minor, K. Anh 220 (K. 16a) (spurious)
- Odysseus: Alan Hovhaness, Symphony No. 25, Op. 275
- L'Œuvre: Karl Amadeus Hartmann, Symphony (1937–38), material later re-worked in Symphony No. 6
- Oh Let Man Not Forget These Words Divine: Alan Hovhaness, Symphony No. 62, Op. 402
- Oliver Cromwell: Rutland Boughton, Symphony No 1 (1904-5)
- Organ:
  - Aaron Copland, Organ Symphony (his Symphony No. 1 is an arrangement of this symphony without the organ)
  - Camille Saint-Saëns, Symphony No. 3 in C minor, Op. 78
- Overture in the Italian Style: Wolfgang Amadeus Mozart, Symphony No. 32 in G major, K. 318
- Oxford: Joseph Haydn, Symphony No. 92 in G major, Hob. I/92

== P ==
- Paganini: Jivan Gurgeni Ter-T'at'evosian, Symphony No. 5
- Palindrome: Joseph Haydn, Symphony No. 47 in G major, Hob. I/47
- Paris: Wolfgang Amadeus Mozart, Symphony No. 31 in D major, K. 297/300a
- La passione: Joseph Haydn, Symphony No. 49 in F minor, Hob. I/49
- Pastoral:
  - Ludwig van Beethoven, Piano Sonata No. 15 in D major, Op. 28
  - Ludwig van Beethoven, Symphony No. 6 in F major, Op. 68
  - Alexander Glazunov, Symphony No. 7 in F major, Op. 77
  - Ralph Vaughan Williams, Symphony No. 3, A Pastoral Symphony
- La pastorella: Antonio Vivaldi, Recorder, oboe concerto RV 95/95a (The Little Shepherdess)
- Pathétique:
  - Ludwig van Beethoven, Piano Sonata No. 8 in C minor, Op. 13
  - Franz Liszt, Concerto pathétique for 2 pianos, S. 258
  - Pyotr Ilyich Tchaikovsky, Symphony No. 6 in B minor, Op. 74
- Pauses: Anton Bruckner, Symphony No. 2 in C minor, Symphony of Pauses
- Peace:
  - Peace, Symphony of (Sinfonia da Paz) - Cláudio Santoro, Symphony No. 4
  - The Peace (A Paz) - Heitor Villa-Lobos, Symphony No. 5 (lost)
- Pesther Carneval: Franz Liszt, Hungarian Rhapsody No. 9, S. 244/9
- Philosopher: Joseph Haydn, Symphony No. 22 in E♭ major, Hob. I/22
- Pilgrim på Havet: Malcolm Williamson, Symphony No. 2
- Pilgrimage of a Little Soul: Leoš Janáček, Violin Concerto (unfinished)
- The Pioneers: Don Gillis, Symphony No. 6
- Les plaintes d'un troubadour: Franz Schubert, Moment musical No. 6 in A♭ major, D. 780/6
- Planet Earth: Johan de Meij, Symphony No. 3
- Pleiades M45: William T. Blows, Symphony No. 2
- Plutonian Ode: Philip Glass, Symphony No. 6
- The Poem of Ecstasy: Alexander Scriabin, symphonic poem The Poem of Ecstasy, Op. 54 (sometimes called "Symphony No. 4")
- Poétique: William T. Blows, Symphony No. 9
- Polish: Pyotr Ilyich Tchaikovsky, Symphony No. 3 in D major, Op. 29
- Polyphonic: Arvo Pärt, Symphony No. 1
- Pomes Penyeach: Michael Jeffrey Shapiro, Symphony No. 1
- Posthorn: Wolfgang Amadeus Mozart, Serenade No. 9 in D major, K. 320
- Prague:
  - Dmitry Kabalevsky, Piano Concerto No. 4, Op. 99
  - Wolfgang Amadeus Mozart, Symphony No. 38 in D major, K. 504
- La primavera: Antonio Vivaldi, from Le quattro stagioni, Violin Concerto RV 269, Op. 8 L'estro armonico first concerto (from The Four Seasons: The Spring)
- Prussian:
  - Joseph Haydn, String Quartets, Op. 50
  - Wolfgang Amadeus Mozart, String Quartets No. 21-23, K. 575, 589, 590
- Psalms: Igor Stravinsky, Symphony of Psalms
- Pushkin: Boris Tishchenko, A Pushkin Symphony

== Q ==
- Queen:
  - Tolga Kashif, The Queen Symphony (based on the music of the pop group Queen)
  - see also La Reine

== R ==
- Raindrop: Frédéric Chopin, Prelude No. 15 in D♭ major, Op. 28/15
- Rákóczi March: Franz Liszt, Hungarian Rhapsody No. 15, S. 244/15
- Rasumovsky: Ludwig van Beethoven, String Quartets Nos. 7 – 9, Op. 59
- Rebirth: Mieczysław Karłowicz, Symphony in E minor, Op. 7
- Reformation: Felix Mendelssohn, Symphony No. 5 in D major/minor, Op. 107
- La Reine (The Queen): Joseph Haydn, Symphony No. 85 in B♭ major, Hob. I/85
- Reliquie: Franz Schubert, Piano Sonata No. 15 in C major, D. 840
- Requiem:
  - Benjamin Britten, Sinfonia da Requiem
  - Howard Hanson, Symphony No. 4
  - Dmitry Kabalevsky, Symphony No. 3, Op. 22
- Resurrection: Gustav Mahler, Symphony No. 2 in C minor
- Reverenza: Bertold Hummel, Symphony No. 2
- Revolutionary: Frédéric Chopin, Etude in C minor, Op. 10/12
- Rhapsodic: William T. Blows, Symphony No. 8
- Rhenish: Robert Schumann, Symphony No. 3 in E♭ major, Op. 97
- Robusta: Boris Tishchenko, Sinfonia Robusta
- Roma: Georges Bizet, Roma Symphony
- Roman: Charles-Marie Widor, Symphony for Organ No. 10
- Romantic/Romantica:
  - Romantic - William T. Blows, Symphony No. 7
  - Romantic - Anton Bruckner, Symphony No. 4 in E♭ major
  - Romantic - Howard Hanson, Symphony No. 2 in D♭ major, Op. 30
  - Romantica - Carlos Chávez, Symphony No. 4, Sinfonía romántica
- Roméo et Juliette: Hector Berlioz, Roméo et Juliette Symphony
- Rosamunde (Franz Schubert):
  - String Quartet No. 13 in A minor, D. 804
  - Impromptu No. 3 in B♭ major, D. 935/3
- Rotary: Karlheinz Stockhausen: Rotary Wind Quintet (the composer's third un-numbered wind quintet)
- La Roxelane: Joseph Haydn, Symphony No. 63 in C major, Hob. I/63
- Russian: Joseph Haydn, String Quartets, Op. 33
- Rustic/Rustica:
  - Rustic - William T. Blows, Symphony No. 6
  - Rustic Wedding - Karl Goldmark, Rustic Wedding Symphony (Ländliche Hochzeit, literally "Countryside Wedding")
  - Rustica - Vagn Holmboe, Symphony No. 3, Sinfonia Rustica
  - Alla rustica - Antonio Vivaldi Violin Concerto RV 151

== S ==
- Sacra:
  - Sinfonia Sacra - Howard Hanson, Symphony No. 5
  - Sinfonia Sacra - Andrzej Panufnik, Symphony No. 3
  - Sinfonia Sacra - Charles-Marie Widor, Sinfonia sacra for organ and orchestra
  - Symphony Sacra - Alan Hovhaness, Symphony No. 58, Op. 389
- Sacrée: Charles Tournemire, Symphonie sacrée for organ
- Saga of the Prairie School: Don Gillis, Symphony No. 7
- St. Anne: Johann Sebastian Bach, Prelude and Fuge in E♭ major BWV 552 for Organ
- Saint Cecilia: George Frideric Handel, Concerto Grosso in D major, St Cecilia's Concerto, HWV 323
- Saint Vartan: Alan Hovhaness, Symphony No. 9, Op. 80/180
- San Francisco:
  - San Francisco - Roy Harris, Symphony No. 8
  - A Symphony of San Francisco - Meredith Willson, Symphony No. 1 in F minor
- The Schoolmaster: Joseph Haydn, Symphony No. 55 in E♭ major, Hob. I/55
- Scottish: Felix Mendelssohn, Symphony No. 3 in A minor, Op. 56
- Sea:
  - Howard Hanson, Symphony No. 7, A Sea Symphony
  - Ralph Vaughan Williams, Symphony No. 1, A Sea Symphony
- Semplice (see also Simple):
  - Carl Nielsen, Symphony No. 6, Sinfonia semplice
  - Eduard Tubin, Symphony No. 9, Sinfonia semplice
- Serenata Notturna: Wolfgang Amadeus Mozart, Serenade No. 6 in D major, K. 239
- Serious (and variants):
  - Serioso - Ludwig van Beethoven, String Quartet No. 11 in F minor, Op. 95
  - Sérieuse - Franz Berwald, Symphony No. 1
- The Seven Gates of Jerusalem: Krzysztof Penderecki, Symphony No. 7
- Seven Stars: Charles Koechlin, Seven Stars Symphony
- Short: Aaron Copland, Symphony No. 2
- Der Sieg vom Helden Koburg: Wolfgang Amadeus Mozart, Contredanse in C, K. 587
- Siege Chronicles: Boris Tishchenko, The Siege Chronicles, a symphony for full orchestra
- Das Siegeslied: Havergal Brian, Symphony No. 4
- Silver Pilgrimage: Alan Hovhaness, Symphony No. 15, Op. 199
- Simple (see also Semplice):
  - Benjamin Britten, Simple Symphony, Op. 4
- Sinfonia: see Symphony
- Singulière: Franz Berwald, Symphony No. 3
- Six-minute: John McCabe, Six-minute Symphony
- Slavic: Alexander Glazunov, Symphony No. 1 in E major, Op. 5
- Le soir: Joseph Haydn, Symphony No. 8 in G major, Hob. I/8
- The Song of the Earth: Gustav Mahler, Das Lied von der Erde (a symphony in the guise of a song cycle)
- Song of the Night: Gustav Mahler, Symphony No. 7
- Sorrowful Songs: Henryk Górecki, Symphony No. 3, Op. 36, Symphony of Sorrowful Songs
- Souvenir des Ming: Jeffrey Ching, Symphony No. 4, "Souvenir des Ming"
- Spinning Song: Felix Mendelssohn, Song without Words in A major, Op. 67/4
- Spring:
  - Ludwig van Beethoven: Violin Sonata No. 5 in F major, Op. 24
  - Benjamin Britten, Spring Symphony, Op. 44
  - Wolfgang Amadeus Mozart, String Quartet No. 14 in G major, K. 387
  - Robert Schumann, Symphony No. 1 in B♭ major, Op. 38
- Spring Song: Felix Mendelssohn, Song without Words in A major, Op. 62/6
- Star Dawn: Alan Hovhaness, Symphony No. 53, Op. 377
- Steppes of Central Asia, In the: Alexander Borodin, Musical Picture: In Central Asia
- Stonehenge: Paul W. Whear, Symphony No. 1
- Strings, Symphony for:
  - Carlos Chávez, Symphony No. 5
  - Vincent Persichetti, Symphony No. 5
  - Malcolm Williamson, Symphony No. 7
- Study: Anton Bruckner, Study Symphony, a.k.a. Symphony No. 00
- Sud'ba cheloveka (The Fate of a Man): Jivan Gurgeni Ter-T'at'evosian, Symphony No. 2
- Sumé Pater Patrium, Amerindia: Heitor Villa-Lobos, Symphony No. 10
- Sun: Joseph Haydn, String Quartets, Op. 20
- Surprise: Joseph Haydn, Symphony No. 94 in G major, Hob. I/94
- Symphonia/Symphonie: see Symphony
- Symphony/ Symphonia/ Symphonie/ Sinfonia/ Symphonic:
  - Antígona: Carlos Chávez, Symphony No. 1, Sinfonía de Antígona
  - Antique: attrib. Friedrich Witt, Symphonie antique for organ and orchestra, with choral finale
  - Antique: Charles-Marie Widor, Symphonie Antique for soloists, chorus, orchestra, and organ
  - Antartica: Ralph Vaughan Williams, Symphony No. 7, Sinfonia antartica
  - Boreale: Vagn Holmboe, Symphony No. 8, Sinfonia boreale
  - Borealis: Arthur Butterworth, Symphony No. 3, Op. 52, Sinfonia Borealis
  - Brasilia: Cláudio Santoro, Symphony No. 7, Sinfonia Brasilia
  - Breve: Gösta Nystroem, Sinfonia breve
  - Brevis:
    - Havergal Brian, Symphony No. 22, Symphonia Brevis
    - Vincent d'Indy, Symphony No. 3, Sinfonia brevis de bello Gallico
  - Cévenole: Vincent d'Indy, Symphonie Cévenole (Cévennes Symphony), a.k.a. Symphonie sur un chant montagnard français (Symphony on a French Mountain Air)
  - Children in the streets: Thomas Koppel, Symphony for Children in the streets (Symfoni for gadens børn)
  - Comica: Felix Draeseke, Symphony No. 4, Symphonia Comica
  - Concertante: Karl Amadeus Hartmann, Symphony No. 5, Symphonie concertante
  - Cuerdas: Carlos Chávez, Symphony No. 5, Sinfonía para cuerdas
  - Deux mondes: Pierre Kaelin, Symphonie des deux mondes (Symphony of the Two Worlds)
  - Domestica: Richard Strauss, Symphonia Domestica, Op. 53
  - Energica: Jānis Ivanovs, Symphony No. 12, Sinfonia energica
  - Espagnole: Édouard Lalo, Symphonie espagnole in D minor, Op. 21 (actually a violin concerto)
  - Espansiva: Carl Nielsen, Symphony No. 3, Sinfonia Espansiva, Op. 27
  - Faith: Don Gillis, Symphony No. 2, Symphony of Faith
  - Fantasia: Hubert Parry, Symphony No. 5, Symphonic fantasia
  - Fantastique: Hector Berlioz, Symphonie fantastique
  - Free Men: Don Gillis, Symphony No. 3, A Symphony for Free Men
  - French: Boris Tishchenko, A French Symphony
  - French Mountain Air: Vincent d'Indy, Symphony on a French Mountain Air (Symphonie sur un chant montagnard français) a.k.a. Symphonie Cévenole ("Cévennes Symphony")
  - Fun: Don Gillis, Symphony No. 5½, A Symphony for Fun
  - Humana: Jānis Ivanovs, Symphony No. 13, Symphonia humana
  - India: Carlos Chávez, Symphony No. 2, Sinfonía india
  - Ipsa: Jānis Ivanovs, Symphony No. 15, Sinfonia Ipsa
  - Janiculum: Vincent Persichetti, Symphony No. 9, Sinfonia Janiculum
  - Metal Orchestra: Alan Hovhaness, Symphony No. 17, Op. 203, Symphony for Metal Orchestra
  - Pauses: Anton Bruckner, Symphony No. 2 in C minor, Symphony of Pauses
  - Peace: Cláudio Santoro, Symphony No. 4, Sinfonia da Paz (Symphony of Peace)
  - Psalms: Igor Stravinsky, Symphony of Psalms
  - Pushkin: Boris Tishchenko, A Pushkin Symphony
  - Requiem: Benjamin Britten, Sinfonia da Requiem, Op. 20
  - Robusta: Boris Tishchenko, Sinfonia Robusta
  - Romantica: Carlos Chávez, Symphony No. 4, Sinfonía romántica
  - Rustica: Vagn Holmboe, Symphony No. 3, Sinfonia rustica
  - Sacra:
    - Howard Hanson, Symphony No. 5, Sinfonia Sacra
    - Alan Hovhaness, Symphony No. 58, Op. 389, Symphony Sacra
    - Andrzej Panufnik, Symphony No. 3, Sinfonia Sacra
    - Charles-Marie Widor, Sinfonia sacra for organ and orchestra
  - Sacrée: Charles Tournemire, Symphonie sacrée for organ
  - San Francisco: Meredith Willson, Symphony No. 1 in F minor, A Symphony of San Francisco
  - Semplice:
    - Carl Nielsen, Symphony No. 6, Sinfonia semplice
    - Eduard Tubin, Symphony No. 9, Sinfonia semplice
  - Sorrowful Songs: Henryk Górecki, Symphony No. 3, Op. 36, Symphony of Sorrowful Songs
  - Strings:
    - Vincent Persichetti, Symphony No. 5, Symphony for Strings
    - Malcolm Williamson, Symphony No. 7, Symphony for Strings
  - Thousand: Gustav Mahler, Symphony No. 8 in E♭ major, Symphony of a Thousand
  - Three Movements: Igor Stravinsky, Symphony in Three Movements
  - Trabalho: Francisco Mignone, Sinfonia do Trabalho
  - Tragica:
    - Havergal Brian, Symphony No. 6, Sinfonia Tragica
    - Felix Draeseke, Symphony No. 3, Symphonia Tragica
    - Karl Amadeus Hartmann, later reworked as part of Symphony No. 3
  - Transamazônica: Francisco Mignone, Sinfonia transamazônica
  - Tropical: Francisco Mignone, Sinfonia tropical
  - Two Worlds: Pierre Kaelin, Symphonie des deux mondes (Symphony of the Two Worlds)
  - 1933: Roy Harris, Symphony No. 1, Symphony 1933

== T ==
- Tempest: Ludwig van Beethoven, Piano Sonata No. 17 in D minor, Op. 31/2
- La tempesta di mare:
  - Antonio Vivaldi Violin concerto RV 253 (The Sea Tempest)
  - Antonio Vivaldi Flute concerto RV 443 (The Sea Tempest)
  - Antonio Vivaldi Flute, oboe, violin, bassoon concerto RV 98 and RV 570 (The Sea Tempest)
- Tempora mutantur: Joseph Haydn, Symphony No. 64 in A major, Hob. I/64
- Thousand: Gustav Mahler, Symphony No. 8 in E♭ major, Symphony of a Thousand
- Three Journeys to a Holy Mountain: Alan Hovhaness, Symphony No. 20, Op. 223
- Three Movements: Igor Stravinsky, Symphony in Three Movements
- Titan: Gustav Mahler, Symphony No. 1 in D major
- To the Appalachian Mountains: Alan Hovhaness, Symphony No. 60, Op. 396
- To the Green Mountains: Alan Hovhaness, Symphony No. 46, Op. 347
- To October: Dmitri Shostakovich, Symphony No. 2 in B major, Op. 14
- Toltec: Philip Glass, Symphony No. 7
- Tost: Joseph Haydn, String Quartets, Opp. 54, 55, 64
- Tragic/Tragica:
  - Havergal Brian, Symphony No. 6, Sinfonia Tragica
  - Frédéric Chopin, Polonaise No. 5 in F♯ minor, Tragic
  - Felix Draeseke, Symphony No. 3, Symphonia Tragica
  - Gustav Mahler, Symphony No. 6 in A minor, Tragic
  - Franz Schubert, Symphony No. 4 in C minor, D. 417, Tragic
- Trauer: Joseph Haydn, Symphony No. 44 in E minor, Hob. I/44
- Trauermarsch (Funeral March): Felix Mendelssohn, Song without Words in E minor, Op. 62/3
- Trout: Franz Schubert, Piano Quintet in A major, D. 667
- Turangalîla: Olivier Messiaen, Turangalîla-Symphonie
- Twickenham: Nikolai Kapustin, Piano Sonata No. 11, Op. 101 (2000)
- Two Worlds: Pierre Kaelin, Symphonie des deux mondes (Symphony of the Two Worlds)

== U ==
- Unfinished: Franz Schubert, Symphony No. 8 in B minor, D. 759
- The Unforeseen (O Improvisto): Heitor Villa-Lobos, Symphony No. 1
- Universe: Charles Ives, Universe Symphony

== V ==
- V, Letter: Joseph Haydn, Symphony No. 88 in G major, Hob. I/88
- Vahaken: Alan Hovhaness, Symphony No. 10, Op. 184
- Vartan, Saint: Alan Hovhaness, Symphony No. 9, Op. 80/180
- Venetian Boat Songs (Felix Mendelssohn):
  - No. 1: Song without Words in G minor, Op. 19/6
  - No. 2: Song without Words in F♯ minor, Op. 30/6
  - No. 3: Song without Words in A minor, Op. 62/5
- Veneziana, Alla: Arthur Butterworth, Trumpet Concerto, Op. 93, Alla Veneziana
- Versuch eines Requiem: Karl Amadeus Hartmann, Symphony No. 1
- The Victory (A Vitória): Heitor Villa-Lobos, Symphony No. 4
- Vincentiana: Einojuhani Rautavaara, Symphony No. 6
- Vishnu: Alan Hovhaness, Symphony No. 19, Op. 217
- Vision of Andromeda: Alan Hovhaness, Symphony No. 48, Op. 355
- Voces intimae: Jean Sibelius, String Quartet, Op. 56
- Volkslied (Folksong): Felix Mendelssohn, Song without Words in A♭ major, Op. 53/5

== W ==
- Wagner: Anton Bruckner, Symphony No. 3 in D minor, Wagner Symphony
- Waldstein: Ludwig van Beethoven, Piano Sonata No. 21 in C major, Op. 53
- Walla Walla, Land of Many Waters: Alan Hovhaness, Symphony No. 47, Op. 348
- Wanderer: Franz Schubert, Fantasy in C major, D. 760
- The Wandering of a Little Soul: Leoš Janáček, Violin Concerto (unfinished)
- The War (A Guerra): Heitor Villa-Lobos, Symphony No. 3
- Warsaw: Richard Addinsell, Warsaw Concerto
- White Mass: Alexander Scriabin, Piano Sonata No. 7, Op. 64
- Wine of Summer: Havergal Brian, Symphony No. 5
- Winter Daydreams: Pyotr Ilyich Tchaikovsky, Symphony No. 1 in G minor, Op. 13
- Winter Wind: Frédéric Chopin, Etude in A minor, Op. 25/11

== Y ==
- The Year 1905: Dmitri Shostakovich, Symphony No. 11 in G minor, Op. 103
- The Year 1917: Dmitri Shostakovich, Symphony No. 12 in D minor, Op. 112
- Year of the Silent Sun: Anatol Vieru: Symphony No. 7
- Youth: Dmitry Kabalevsky, Piano Concerto No. 3 in D major, Op. 50
- Youth and Life: Henry Kimball Hadley, Symphony No. 1 in D minor, Op. 25

== Z ==
- Zeitmaße: the first of Karlheinz Stockhausen's three unnumbered wind quintets

== Numeric ==
- 00: Anton Bruckner, Symphony No. 00, a.k.a. Study Symphony
- 1812 Overture: Pyotr Ilyich Tchaikovsky
- 1. X. 1905: Leoš Janáček, Piano Sonata (a.k.a. From the Street)
- The Year 1905: Dmitri Shostakovich, Symphony No. 11 in G minor, Op. 103
- The Year 1917: Dmitri Shostakovich, Symphony No. 12 in D minor, Op. 112
- 1933: Roy Harris, Symphony No. 1, Symphony 1933

== See also ==
- List of symphonies with names
