= List of compositions by Leoš Janáček =

This list of compositions by Leoš Janáček can be sorted by their genre, catalogue number (JW), date composed, Czech title, and English title. Click on the column headings.

JW numbers are from Nigel Simeone, John Tyrrell, and Alena Němcová, Janáček's Works: A Catalogue of the Music and Writings of Leoš Janáček (Oxford: Clarendon Press, 1997). The correct format for JW numbers is Roman numeral (for the genre) before the slash and Arabic numeral (for the work) after the slash. Arabic numerals have been used throughout here for sortability.

Genre	JW	Date composed	Czech title	English title	Scoring	Notes
Opera	JW 1/1	1887–1888	Šárka	Šárka		revised 1919
Opera	JW 1/3	1891	Počátek románu	The Beginning of a Romance		
Opera	JW 1/4	1894–1903	Její pastorkyňa	Jenůfa or "Her Stepdaughter"		revised 1908, 1915
Opera	JW 1/5	1903–1905	Osud	Destiny (Fate)		revised 1906–1907
Opera	JW 1/6; JW 1/7	1908–1916; 1917	Výlety páně Broučkovy: 1. Výlet pana Broučka do měsíce 2. Výlet pana Broučka do XV. století	The Excursions of Mr. Brouček: 1. Mr. Brouček’s Excursion to the Moon; 2. Mr. Brouček’s Excursion to the 15th Century		
Opera	JW 1/8	1919–1921	Káťa Kabanová	Káťa Kabanová		
Opera	JW 1/9	1921–1923	Příhody lišky Bystroušky	The Cunning Little Vixen		
Opera	JW 1/10	1923–1925	Věc Makropulos	The Makropulos Affair		
Opera	JW 1/11	1927–1928	Z mrtvého domu	From the House of the Dead		
Ballet	JW 1/2	1891	Rákós Rákóczy	Rákós Rákóczy		
Orchestral	JW 6/1	1875	Zvuky ku památce Förchtgotta-Tovačovského	Sounds in Memory of Förchtgotta-Tovačovského	string orchestra	
Orchestral	JW 6/2	1877	Suita	Suite	string orchestra	
Orchestral	JW 6/3	1878	Idyla	Idyll	string orchestra	
Orchestral	JW 6/4	1889–1891	Valašské tance	Valachian Dances	orchestra	Op. 2
Orchestral	JW 6/5	1890	Adagio	Adagio	orchestra	
Orchestral	JW 6/6	c.1891	Suita (Serenáda)	Suite (Serenade)	orchestra	Op. 3
Orchestral	JW 6/7	1888	Moravské tance	Moravian Dances	orchestra	5 folk dances
Orchestral	JW 6/8	1890	Hanácké tance	Hanakian Dances	orchestra	
Orchestral	JW 6/9	1893	České tance, 1. Suita	Czech Dances, Suite I	orchestra	
Orchestral	JW 6/10	1894	Žárlivost	Jealousy	orchestra	overture to the opera Jenůfa
Orchestral	JW 3/6	1898	Smuteční pochod	Funeral March	orchestra	Epilogue from the cantata Amarus
Orchestral	JW 6/11	1899	Požehnaný	Požehnaný (Lachian Dance)	orchestra	
Orchestral	JW 6/12	1899	Kozáček	Kozáček (Russian Dance)	orchestra	
Orchestral	JW 6/13	c.1899	Srbské kolo	Srbské kolo (Serbian Dance)	orchestra	
Orchestral	JW 6/14	1912	Šumařovo dítě	The Fiddler's Child	orchestra	Ballade
Orchestral	JW 6/15	1915–1918	Taras bulba	Taras Bulba	orchestra	Rhapsody
Orchestral	JW 6/16	1920	Balada Blanická	Ballad of Blaník	orchestra	symphonic poem; original title: Blaničtí rytíři (The Knights of Blaník)
Orchestral	JW 6/17	1924	Lašské tance	Lachian Dances	orchestra	new selection and revision of pieces from as early as 1889
Orchestral	JW 6/18	1926	Sinfonietta (Symfonietta vojenská)	Sinfonietta	orchestra	
Orchestral	JW 9/7	1923–1928	Dunaj	The Danube	orchestra	symphonic fragment
Orchestral	JW 9/11	1928	Trunda a Lajda	Trunda and Lajda	orchestra	incidental music for Gerhart Hauptmann's Schluck und Jau
Concertante	JW 7/11	1925	Concertino	Concertino	piano and chamber ensemble	
Concertante	JW 7/12	1926	Capriccio „Vzdor“	Capriccio “Defiance”	piano left-hand and chamber ensemble	
Concertante	JW 9/10	1926	Houslový Koncert „Putování dušičky“	The Wandering of a Little Soul, Concerto	violin and orchestra	also known in English as "Pilgrimage of a Little Soul"
Chamber music	JW 7/1	1875	Znělka I	Sonnet I	4 violins	
Chamber music	JW 7/2	1875	Znělka II	Sonnet II	4 violins	incomplete
Chamber music	JW 7/3	1879	Romance	Romance	violin and piano	
Chamber music	JW 7/4	1880	Dumka	Dumka	violin and piano	
Chamber music	JW 7/5	1910	Pohádka	Fairy Tale, 4 Pieces	cello and piano	revised 1912, 1923
Chamber music	JW 7/6	1910	Presto	Presto	cello and piano	
Chamber music	JW 7/7	1914	Houslová sonáta	Violin Sonata	violin and piano	revised 1921
Chamber music	JW 7/8	1923	Smyčcový kvartet č. 1 „Z podnětu Tolstého Kreutzerovy sonáty“	String Quartet No. 1 “Inspired by Tolstoy’s Kreutzer Sonata”	2 violins, viola and cello	
Chamber music	JW 7/9	1924	Pochod modráčků	March of the Blue Boys	piccolo and piano	
Chamber music	JW 7/10	1924	Mládí	Youth	wind sextet (flute, oboe, clarinet, bass clarinet, bassoon, horn)	
Chamber music	JW 7/13	1928	Smyčcový kvartet č. 2 „Listy důvěrné“	String Quartet No. 2 “Intimate Letters”	2 violins, viola and cello	
Organ	JW 8/2	1875	Předehra	Overture	organ	
Organ	JW 8/3	1875	Varyto	Lyre	organ	
Organ	JW 8/4	1875	Chorální fantasie	Choralfantasie	organ	
Organ	JW 8/7	1884	Dvě skladby pro varhany	2 Pieces for Organ	organ	
Organ	JW 2/11	1902?	Svatý Václave	Saint Wenceslas	organ	organ accompaniment for an old Czech hymn
Piano	JW 8/6	1880	Tema con variazioni – Zdeňčiny variace	Zdenka Variations in B♭ major	piano	Op. 1
Piano	JW 8/8	1885	Dymák	Dymák	piano	folk dance arrangement
Piano	JW 8/9	1887?	Na památku	In Remembrance	piano	
Piano	JW 8/10	1888–1889	Národní tance na Moravě	Folk Dances of Moravia	piano 2- or 4-hands, with cimbalom or voice ad libitum	21 folk arrangements
Piano	JW 8/11	1888	Srňátko	Srňátko	piano	folk dance arrangement
Piano	JW 8/12	1893	Ej, danaj!	Hey, come on!	piano	folk dance arrangement; combined with JW 8/18 as 3 Moravské tance (3 Moravian Dances)
Piano	JW 8/13	1893	Hudba ke kroužení kužely	Music for Club-swinging Exercises	piano	
Piano	JW 8/14	1893?	Řezníček	Řezníček	piano	folk dance arrangement
Piano	JW 8/15	1893?	Zezulenka	Zezulenka	piano	folk dance arrangement
Piano	JW 8/16	1894	Žárlivost	Jealousy	piano 4-hands	piano transcription of JW 6/10
Piano	JW 8/17	1901–1908	Po zarostlém chodníčku	On an Overgrown Path	piano	
Piano	JW 8/18	c.1904	2 Moravské tance	2 Moravian Dances	piano	folk dance arrangements; combined with JW 8/12 as 3 Moravské tance (3 Moravian Dances)
Piano	JW 8/19	1905	Sonáta pro klavír „1. X. 1905, Z ulice“	Piano Sonata “1 October 1905, From the Street” in E♭ minor	piano	
Piano	JW 8/20	1909	Narodil se Kristus Pán	Christ, the Lord, Is Risen	piano with voice ad libitum	Czech Christmas song arrangement
Piano	JW 8/21	1911	Moderato	Moderato	piano	
Piano	JW 8/22	1912	V mlhách	In the Mists	piano	
Piano	JW 8/23	1922	Moravské lidové písně	Moravian Folk Songs	piano with voice ad libitum	15 folk song arrangements
Piano	JW 8/24	1911	Ej, duby, duby	Ej, duby, duby	piano with voice ad libitum	folk song arrangement
Piano	JW 8/25	1922-23?	Budem tady stat	Budem tady stat (We Will Stay Here)	piano with voice ad libitum	folk song arrangement
Piano	JW 8/26	1923	Con moto	Con moto	piano	
Piano	JW 8/27	1924	Skladba bez názvu	Untitled Piece	piano	
Piano	JW 8/28	1925	Bratřím Mrštíkům	To the Mrštík Brothers	piano	
Piano	JW 8/29	1926?	Skladba bez názvu	Untitled Piece	piano	
Piano	JW 8/30	1926?	Na starém hradě hukvalském	In the Old Castle at Hukvaldy	piano	folk dance arrangement
Piano	JW 8/31	1927	Andante	Andante	piano	
Piano	JW 8/32	1928	Vzpomínka	A Recollection	piano	
Piano	JW 8/33		Skladby v památníku Kamily Stösslové	Pieces in the Kamila Stösslová Album	piano and harmonium	13 pieces
Choral	JW 4/1	1873	Orání	Ploughing	male chorus	
Choral	JW 4/2	1873	Válečná [1]	War Song [1]	male chorus	
Choral	JW 4/3	1873	Válečná [2]	War Song [2]	male chorus, trumpet, 3 trombones and piano	
Choral	JW 4/4	1873	Nestálost lásky	Inconsistency in Love	male chorus	
Choral	JW 4/5	1873–1876	Divím se milému	How Strange My Lover Is	male chorus	
Choral	JW 4/6	1873–1876	Vínek stonulý		male chorus	
Choral	JW 4/7	1874	Osamělá bez těchy [1]	Forsaken [1]	male chorus	revised in 1898 as JW 4/26
Choral	JW 2/1	1874	Graduale „Speciosus forma“	Graduale “Speciosus forma”	chorus and organ	motet
Choral	JW 2/2	1875	Introitus in festo Ss. Nominis Jesu	Introitus in festo Ss. Nominis Jesu	chorus and organ	motet
Choral	JW 2/3	1875	Exaudi Deus [1]	Exaudi Deus [1]	chorus and organ	motet
Choral	JW 2/4	1875	Exaudi Deus [2]	Exaudi Deus [2]	chorus and organ	motet
Choral	JW 2/5	1875	Benedictus	Benedictus	chorus and organ	motet
Choral	JW 2/6	1875	Communio „Fidelis servus“	Communio “Fidelis servus”	chorus	motet
Choral	JW 2/7	1875–1878	Regnum mundi	Regnum mundi	chorus	motet
Choral	JW 2/8	1875–1879	Exsurge Domine	Exsurge Domine	chorus	motet
Choral	JW 2/9	1875?–1879	Graduale in festo purificationis BVM „Suscepimus“	Graduale in festo purificationis BVM “Suscepimus”	chorus	motet
Choral	JW 4/8	1876	Láska opravdivá	True Love	male chorus	
Choral	JW 4/9	1876	Osudu neujdeš	You Will Not Escape Fate	male chorus	
Choral	JW 4/10	1876	Zpěvná duma		male chorus	
Choral	JW 4/11	1876?	Na košatej jedli dva holubi seďá	Two Pigeons Sitting in a Fir Tree	male chorus	
Choral	JW 4/12	1877	Slavnostní sbor (k položení základního kamene ústavu ku vzdělání učitelů)	Festival Chorus (to lay the foundation of the Institute for the Education of Teachers)	4 male voices and chorus	
Choral	JW 4/13	1878?	Slavnostní sbor ku svěcení nové budovy c. k. slovanského ústavu ku vzdělání učitelů v Brně	Ceremonial Chorus for the Consecration of the New Building of the C.K. Slavic Institute for Teacher Education in Brno	baritone, male chorus and piano	
Choral	JW 4/14	1880	Píseň v jeseni	Autumn Song	chorus	
Choral	JW 4/15	1880–1885	Na prievoze	At the Ferry	male chorus	
Choral	JW 2/10	1881	České církevní zpěvy z Lehnerova mešního kancionálu	Czech Church Hymns From Lehner's Mass Canon	chorus and organ	
Choral	JW 4/16	1883	Ave Maria	Ave Maria	male chorus	
Choral	JW 4/17	1885	Čtveřice mužských sborů	4 Male Choruses	male chorus	
Choral	JW 4/18	1885	Kačena divoká	The Wild Duck	chorus	
Choral	JW 4/19	1888	Tři sbory mužské	3 Male Choruses	male chorus	
Choral	JW 4/20	1889?	Královničky. „Staré národní tance obřadné se zpěvy“		unison chorus and piano	10 folk songs and dances
Choral	JW 3/1	1890	Naše píseň [1]	Our Song [1]	chorus and orchestra	
Choral	JW 3/1	1890	Sivý sokol zaletěl	The Grey Falcon Flew	chorus and orchestra	
Choral	JW 4/21	1890	Naše píseň [2]	Our Song [2]	chorus	
Choral	JW 3/2	1891	Komáři se ženili	The Mosquitoes Got Married	chorus and orchestra	folk song arrangement
Choral	JW 3/3	1892	Zelené sem seła		chorus and orchestra	folk song arrangement
Choral	JW 3/4	1893	Keď zme šli na hody	When We Went to the Feast	chorus and orchestra	folk song arrangement
Choral	JW 4/22	1893	Což ta naše bříza	Our Birch Tree	male chorus	
Choral	JW 4/23	1894	Už je slúnko z téj hory ven		baritone, chorus and piano	
Choral	JW 4/24	1894?	Odpočiň si	Get Some Rest	male chorus	funeral chorus
Choral	JW 3/5	1896	Hospodine!	Hear Me, O Lord!	soloists, chorus, brass, harp and organ	cantata
Choral	JW 4/25	1897–1898	Slavnostní sbor k svěcení praporu Svatojosefské jednoty	Festival Chorus for the Consecration of St. Joseph's Banner	male chorus	
Choral	JW 3/6	1897	Amarus	Amarus	soloists, chorus and orchestra	cantata; revised 1901, 1906
Choral	JW 4/26	1898	Osamělá bez těchy [2]	Forsaken [2]	male chorus	
Choral	JW 4/27	1899	Ukvalské písně	Hukvaldy Songs	chorus	6 folk song arrangements
Choral	JW 4/28	1900, 1906	Čtvero mužských sborů moravských	4 Moravian Choruses	male chorus	
Choral	JW 4/29	1901, 1906	Otče náš	Our Father	tenor, chorus and piano (harmonium) or harp and organ	cantata
Choral	JW 2/11	1902?	Svatý Václave	Saint Wenceslas	chorus and organ	organ accompaniment for an old Czech hymn
Choral	JW 2/12	1903	Constitues	Constitues	male chorus and organ	motet
Choral	JW 2/13	1903	Veni Sancte Spiritus	Veni Sancte Spiritus	male chorus	motet
Choral	JW 4/30	1903, 1904	Elegie na smrt dcery Olgy	Elegy on the Death of My Daughter Olga	tenor, chorus and piano	cantata
Choral	JW 2/14	1904	Zdrávas Maria	Ave Maria	tenor (or soprano), chorus, violin and organ or piano	
Choral	JW 4/31	1904–1906	Vínek		male chorus	folk song arrangement
Choral	JW 4/32	1906	Lidová nokturna. Večerní zpěvy slovenského lidu z Rovného (26 Balad lidových II.)	Folk Nocturne. Evening Songs of the Slovak People of Rovné (26 Folk Ballads, Part II)	female vocal duo and piano	7 folk song arrangements
Choral	JW 4/33	1906	Kantor Halfar	Kantor Halfar	male chorus	
Choral	JW 4/34	1906	Maryčka Magdónova [1]	Maryčka Magdónova [1]	male chorus	
Choral	JW 4/35	1907	Maryčka Magdónova [2]	Maryčka Magdónova [2]	male chorus	
Choral	JW 4/36	1909	70.000 (Sedmdesát tisíc)	Seventy-thousand	male chorus	revised 1912
Choral	JW 3/7	1911	Na Soláni čarták		tenor, male chorus and orchestra	cantata
Choral	JW 3/8	1914	Věčné evangelium	The Eternal Gospel	soprano, tenor, chorus and orchestra	cantata
Choral	JW 4/37	1912?, 1916-1917	Pět národních písní (26 Balad lidových IV.)	5 Folk Songs (26 Folk Ballads, Part IV)	tenor, male chorus and piano or harmonium	folk song arrangements
Choral	JW 4/38	1914	Perina	The Featherbed	male chorus	
Choral	JW 4/39	1916	Vlčí stopa	Wolf Tracks	female chorus	
Choral	JW 4/40	1916	Hradčanské písničky	Songs of Hradčany	soprano, female chorus, flute and harp	3 choruses
Choral	JW 4/41	1916	Kašpar Rucký	Kašpar Rucký	soprano, 4 solo female voices and female chorus	
Vocal	JW 5/12	1917–1919	Zápisník zmizelého	The Diary of One Who Disappeared	tenor, alto, 3 female voices and piano	song cycle; revised 1920
Choral	JW 4/42	1918	Česká legie	The Czech Legion	male chorus	
Choral	JW 4/43	1922	Potulný šílenec	The Wandering Madman	male chorus with soprano solo	
Choral	JW 5/16	1924	Říkadla [1]	Nursery Rhymes [1]	1 to 3 mezzo-sopranos, clarinet and piano	8 songs
Choral	JW 4/44	1925–1926	Naše vlajka	Our Flag	male chorus and 2 solo sopranos	
Choral	JW 5/17	1926	Říkadla [2]	Nursery Rhymes [2]	chamber choir and chamber ensemble	introduction and 18 songs
Choral	JW 3/9	1926–1927	Glagolská mše (Mša glagolskaja)	Glagolitic Mass	soloists, double chorus, orchestra and organ	
Choral	JW 4/45	1928	Sbor při kladení základního kamene Masarykovy university v Brně	Chorus Composed for the Occasion of the Laying of the Foundation Stone of the Masaryk University in Brno	male chorus	
Vocal	JW 5/1	1871–1875?	Když mě nechceš, což je víc?	If You Don't Love Me, What Do I Care?	tenor (or chorus) and piano	
Vocal	JW 5/2	1892–1901	Moravská lidová poesie v písních	Moravian Folk Poetry in Songs	voice and piano	53 folk song arrangements
Vocal	JW 5/3	1897–1898	Jarní píseň	Spring Song		revised 1905
Vocal	JW 5/4	1898	Ukvalská lidová poezie v písních	Hukvaldy Folk Poetry in Songs	voice and piano	13 folk song arrangements
Vocal	JW 5/6	1908–1912	Pět moravských tanců	5 Moravian Dances	voice and piano	folk song arrangements
Vocal	JW 5/7	1908–1912	Čtyři balady	4 Ballads	voice and piano	folk song arrangements
Vocal	JW 5/8	1908–1912	Dvě balady	2 Ballads	voice and piano	folk song arrangements
Vocal	JW 5/9	1909	Šest národních písní, jež zpívala Gabel Eva (26 Balad lidových I.)	6 Folk Songs (26 Folk Ballads, Part I)	voice and piano	
Vocal	JW 5/10	1911	Podme, milá, podme!		voice and piano	folk song arrangement
Vocal	JW 5/11	1916	Písně detvanské, zbojnické balady (26 Balad lidových III.)	Detva Songs, Robber’s Ballads (26 Folk Ballads, Part III)	voice and piano	8 folk song arrangements
Vocal	JW 5/13	1918	Slezské písně (ze sbírky Heleny Salichové)	Silesian Songs (from the collection of Helena Salichové)	voice and piano	10 folk song arrangements
Vocal	JW 5/14	1920	Ukolébavka	Lullaby	voice and piano	folk song arrangement
Vocal	JW 5/15	1923	Úpravy lidových písní v článku „Starosta Smolík“		voice and unspecified instrument	
Vocal	JW 8/23	1922	Moravské lidové písně	Moravian Folk Songs	piano and voice ad libitum	15 folk song arrangements
Vocal	JW 8/24	1911	Ej, duby, duby		piano and voice ad libitum	folk song arrangement
Vocal	JW 8/25	1922-23?	Budem tady stat	We Will Stand Here	piano and voice ad libitum	folk song arrangement
