= Zwitschermaschine =

Zwitschermaschine may refer to:

- Twittering Machine, a painting by Paul Klee
- Die Zwitschermaschine, the fourth movement of Symphony No. 2: Kleetüden by Jason Wright Wingate
- Die Zwitschermachine, Opus 7, a 1951 composition by Giselher Klebe
- Der Mann mit der Zwitschermaschine, a 2002 book by Mario Giordano
