= Youth (wind sextet) =

Woodwind sextet by Leoš Janáček

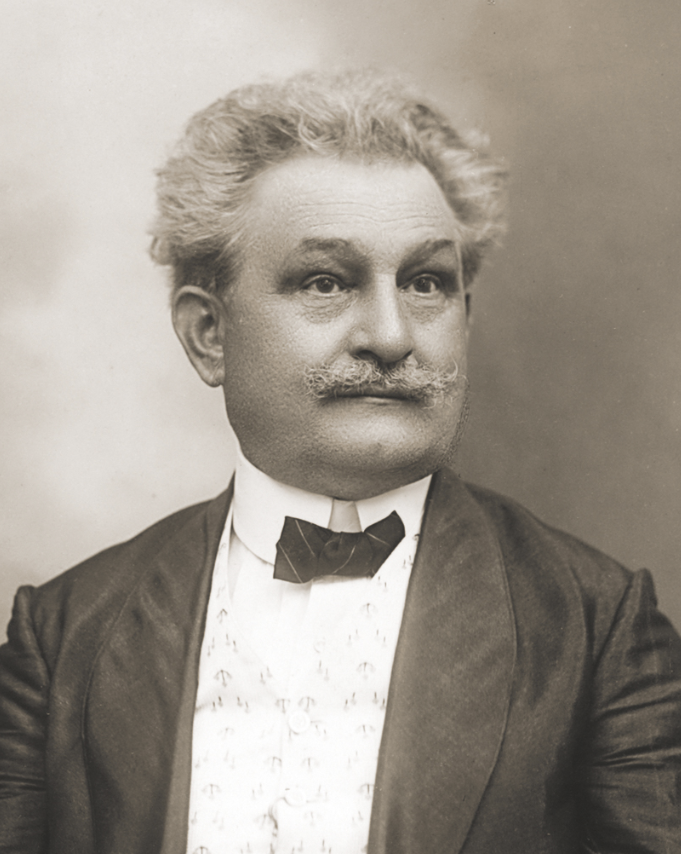
Leoš Janáček in 1914

The woodwind sextet Youth (Czech: Mládí), (1924) is a chamber composition by Czech composer Leoš Janáček. It was composed for flute, oboe, clarinet, horn, bassoon and bass clarinet.

== Background ==
The first impulse to compose a woodwind sextet came into Janáček's mind during his visit of the festival of the International Society of Contemporary Music in Salzburg in August 1923. Albert Roussel´s Divertimento for Wind Quintet and Piano was performed here, and it is possible that this composition motivated Janáček's interest to create a similar work. Another important impulse came to Janáček with a short piece called March of the Blue-Boys for piccolo, bells and tambourine (or piano). It was written in May 1924 as a reminiscence of Janáček's youth in the Old Brno Monastery. He had probably already decided to write a more extensive work. The composition was created during Janáček's three weeks stay in Hukvaldy in July, 1924. At the beginning of the autumn 1924, during the rehearsals, Janáček made a number of changes to the score.

The premiere took place on October 21, 1924, in Besední dům in Brno. The players consisted of the Brno Conservatory teachers Josef Bok (flute and piccolo), Matěj Wagner (oboe), Stanislav Krtička (clarinet), František Janský (horn), and the members of the Brno National Theatre Orchestra František Bříza (bassoon) and Karel Pavelka (bass clarinet). Unfortunately, the performance wasn't very successful. The oboist finally managed to repair a defect of his instrument, but the clarinettist, because of a broken key spring only pretended to be playing. Janáček was very angry. However, the work was performed in Prague on November 25, 1924, this time with members of the Czech Philharmonic, and the performance was received with great success. A pocket score, parts and piano arrangement by Břetislav Bakala were published in January 1925 by Hudební matice.

Youth in 1925 was awarded the Prize of the Czech Academy of Sciences.

== Structure ==
The composition consists of four movements:

1. Allegro
2. Andante sostenuto
3. Vivace
4. Allegro animato

A considerable part of Janáček's chamber music was created in his later years and is considered as an outgrowth of his "youthful mood". The work is example of virtuoso use of a woodwind instrumental ensemble, but it was not only a "technical task" for Janáček. It also contains interesting musical ideas, characteristic of the composer's later style.

Janáček used the main theme from the March of the Blue-Boys in the third movement.

== See also ==
- List of compositions by Leoš Janáček
