= Elegy on the Death of Daughter Olga =

Cantata by Leoš Janáček

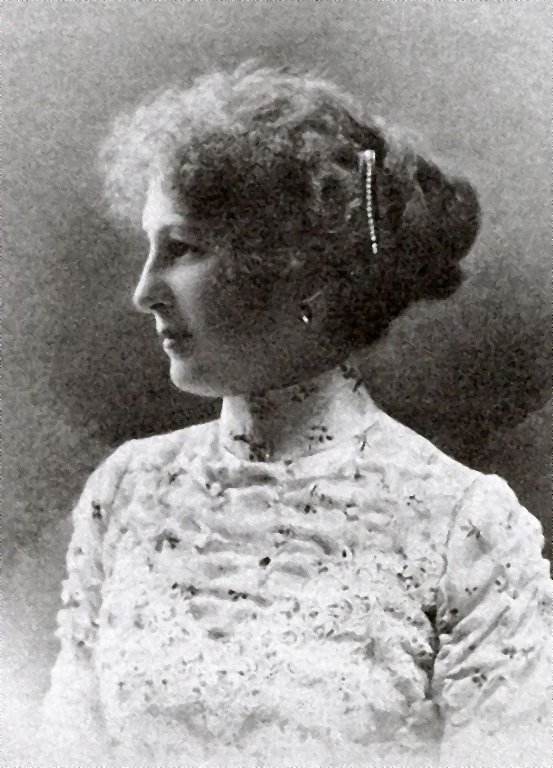
Portrait of Olga Janáčková. The title page of the manuscript of the composition bore the dedication "Mé Olze na památku" [In the memory of my Olga].

Elegy on the Death of Daughter Olga, JW 4/30 (also translated as the Elegy on the Death of My Daughter Olga; in Czech: Elegie na smrt dcery Olgy) is a cantata for tenor solo, mixed choir and pianoforte, written by the Czech composer Leoš Janáček in 1903. It was written to commemorate the death of composer's daughter, Olga Janáčková. Janáček composed the piece to the text of the Russian teacher Marfa Nikolayevna Veveritsa.

== Background ==
Olga was the first-born child of Leoš and Zdenka Janáček. She was born on 15 August 1882 in Brno. From her childhood, she showed remarkable talent in various arts, though not in music (to the mild disappointment of her father). Her mother later recalled that "[Olga] grew up into a lovely girl. Her skin was delicate and smooth with a peach-bloom to it; like her father, she had a dimple in her chin." Sadly, her health was poor from an early age, and her physical state brought a lot of anxiety to her parents. At the age of six, she fell ill with inflammation of joints. She recovered, however, the illness negatively affected the functioning of the heart. The situation worsened after her younger brother Vladimír died in November, 1890. Olga remained the only child of her parents, and also the only bond connecting the members of the family.

Leoš Janáček and his daughter, both keen admirers and supporters of Russian culture, were members of the Russian Circle in Brno. In March, 1902, the composer accompanied Olga to Saint Petersburg, in order to deepen her knowledge of Russian language and to let her become familiar with Russian life and society. His brother František worked there as a teacher. A month later, Olga fell ill with typhoid fever. Her health deteriorated rapidly, and she was forced to return to Brno in July of the same year. After her return, she spent some time in Hukvaldy in order to recuperate; however, her illness reappeared with new and worse complications. After months of suffering, Olga Janáčková died on 26 February 1903.

Her parents were completely devastated. Janáček, raving with pain and despair, tore at his hair and cried: "My soul, my soul!". Zdenka later remembered their loneliness and despair in her memories: "We stayed in our dining room alone. Abandoned, silent. I looked at Leoš. He sat in front of me, destroyed, thin, grey-haired."

Janáček dedicated two of his works to his daughter. He inscribed the first published piano reduction of the opera Jenůfa, his first masterwork and the composition which later opened him the way to the world opera stages, "To the memory of Olga Janáčková".

The second work, the Elegy, was inspired by their common love of Russian culture. It was composed to original Russian verses written by Marfa Veveritsa, a member of the Russian Circle and a friend of Olga. The composition was completed on 28 April 1903, however, Janáček later (in March, 1904) altered some parts of it. The Elegy was apparently composed directly to the Russian original, and it was translated later by B. Zavadil. It was premiered after Janáček's death, on 20 December 1930, in the Brno Radio. The manuscript of the composition was not preserved. The duration of the work is approximately 6 minutes.

== Recordings ==
- Janáček, Leoš: Věčné evangelium [The Eternal Gospel] [CD]. Supraphon SU-3314-2211.
