= Cláudio Santoro =

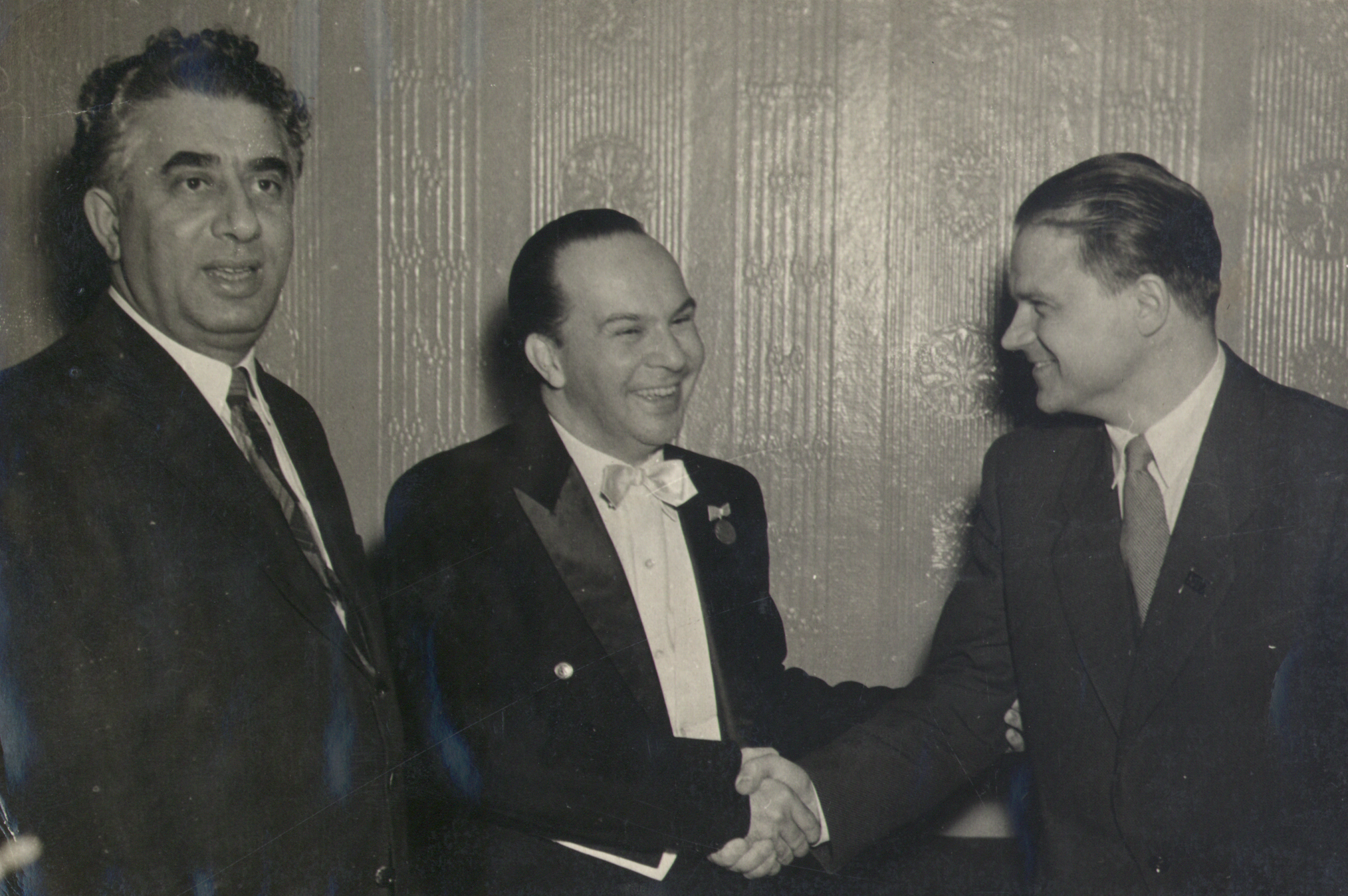
- Claudio Santoro at center with Aram Khachaturian in 1955

Background information
- Born: Cláudio Franco de Sá Santoro; 29 November 1919; Manaus, Brazil
- Died: 27 March 1989 (aged 69) Brasília, Brazil
- Genre: Classical music
- Occupations: Composer and orchestra director
- Website: www.claudiosantoro.art.br

Cláudio Franco de Sá Santoro (23 November 1919 – 27 March 1989) was an internationally renowned Brazilian composer, conductor and violinist.

== Biography ==
=== Early life ===
A native of Manaus, the capital of Amazonas, Santoro started to study violin and piano as a child. His efforts led the Government of Amazonas to send him to study at the Conservatório Brasileiro de Música in Rio de Janeiro.

=== Career ===
At the age of 18, he was already teaching violin at the conservatory. He was a pupil of Hans-Joachim Koellreutter, a composer who influenced him. He also studied in Paris with Nadia Boulanger. He co-founded and played in the Brazilian Symphony Orchestra. His prolific output was mostly instrumental and includes fourteen symphonies, three piano concertos and seven string quartets.

He was invited by the Government of the German Federal Republic for the Program "Resident Artist in West Berlin" (1966–67) and by the Brahms Foundation as Resident Artist of the Brahms House (Baden-Baden).

Claudio Santoro died in Brasília in March 1989 at the age of 69 while conducting the rehearsal of a concert scheduled to commemorate the 14 July bicentennial of the French Revolution.

== Awards ==
He won a 1948 prize from the Lili Boulanger Memorial Fund at the University of Massachusetts, in Boston (the judges included the composers Igor Stravinsky and Aaron Copland).

== Posts ==
His positions, titles and activities include being founder and principal of the Chamber Orchestras of Radio MEC and the University of Brasília, the Symphonic Orchestra of the Radio Club of Brazil and the National Theater of Brasília; titular, Coordinating professor for of the Music Department of the University of Brasília; President of the Brasília Section of the Order of the Musicians of Brazil; Musical Director of the Cultural Foundation of the Federal District; member of the Managing Council of the Inter-American Music Council; organizer and director of the Center of Diffusion and Information for the music of Latin America together with the Institute of Comparative Studies of Music and Documentation (former West-Berlin); Member of the Brazilian Academy of Music, the Brazilian Academy of Arts and the Academy of Music and Letters of Brazil, of which he was President.

Between 1970 and 1978, he was Professor of Conducting and Composition, Director of the Orchestra and the Music Department of Heidelberg-Mannheim's State Superior Music School, in Germany. Orchestras he guest-conducted include the Philharmonic of Leningrad, Moscow State Orchestra, RIAS Berlin, ORTF Paris, OSSODRE Montevideo, Beethovenhalle Bonn, Symphonic Orchestra of the Radio of Prague, Philharmonic of Bucharest, Symphonic Orchestra of Porto, Philharmonic of Sofia, PRO ART (London), Île de France (Paris), Symphonic Orchestra of the Leipzig Radio, Symphonic Orchestra of Magdeburg, Philharmonic of Warsaw, as well as the main Brazilian orchestras.
