= Idyll for Strings =

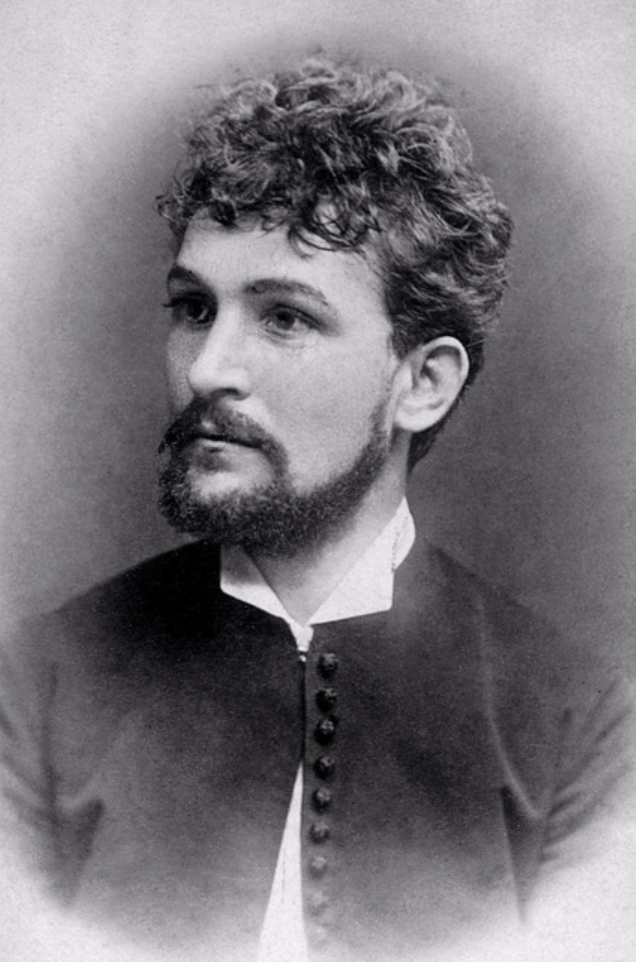
Leoš Janáček in 1882

Idyll for Strings (Czech: Idyla: pro smyčcové nástroje) is an early orchestral suite by the Moravian composer Leoš Janáček, written in a highly Dvořákian style. It was originally composed in 1878 in a five-movement version, but the composer later added two more movements. It has become a popular work and has been recorded many times.

== History ==
The Idyll was composed, or at least sketched, during the summer of 1878 while Janáček was on holiday in the Bavarian town of Oettingen, and is said to have been inspired in part by the scenery of the places he visited. It was first performed in a five-movement version on 15 December of that year in Janáček's home town of Brno. The composer himself conducted, and his friend Antonín Dvořák was in the audience. During the following two years Janáček added two more movements, and he conducted these along with three of the original movements on 12 December 1880, again in Brno. However, he soon came to think of the work as "outdated" and did not attempt another orchestral work for ten more years. Interest in it revived after it was rediscovered in 1938 by the musicologist Vladimír Helfert. The work was first published in 1951, by the firm of Orbis in Prague.

== Structure ==
The first movement is marked Andante, and carries a suggestion of folk music. The second is an Allegro with a middle section marked Moderato. The third is a sombre Moderato with a central Con moto. The fourth is another Allegro, this time very rhythmical. The fifth, a lyrical dumka, is marked Adagio, but has a central Presto; it is one of the two movements Janáček added to the second version of the Idyll. The sixth is a scherzo and trio with a flavour of folk dance. The seventh and last is another Moderato, and is in rondo form; this is the other movement added for the second version.

== Style ==
Janáček's Idyll is a work of his youth, written in a somewhat uncertain and naive style quite unlike that of his later compositions except in its occasional use of unusual rhythms. However, Jaroslav Vogel and Hans Hollander both considered it a technically more assured piece than his still earlier Suite for String Orchestra (1877), and Zdeněk Skoumal praised its "remarkable motivic organisation". Like the Suite it was written under the heavy influence of Dvořák, particularly of his Serenade for Strings, which Janáček had conducted in 1877. Some critics also see traces of the style of Grieg and, in the final movement, Handel.

== Reception ==
There is no critical consensus on the Idyll's merits. Gwyn Parry-Jones found it "undoubtedly an attractive piece...with effective and idiomatic writing for the string orchestra", but Robin Holloway wrote of its "faded lyricism", and one CD reviewer thought it "lacks the spontaneity and freshness" of Dvořák. With the music-loving public it has become a more popular work than Janáček perhaps anticipated. It was reported in 2009 that it had been recorded almost twenty times, and it reached a new public when the Adagio featured on the soundtrack of Philip Kaufman's 1988 film The Unbearable Lightness of Being.

== Selected recordings ==
- Southwest German Chamber Orchestra, Pforzheim, cond. Paul Angerer (1975). Dvorak: Serenade for String Orchestra, Op. 22; Janacek: Idyll for String Orchestra (LP). Turnabout. TV 34532S.
- Los Angeles Chamber Orchestra, cond. Gerard Schwarz (1982). Janáček: Idyll for String Orchestra, Mladi ("Youth") for Wind Sextet (LP). Nonesuch. D-79033.
- Česká Filharmonie, cond. Václav Neumann (1983). Perly České Hudby (LP). Panton. 8110 0319.
- Rotterdams Philharmonisch Orkest, cond. James Conlon (1985). Janáček: Danses lachiennes, Idylle (CD). Erato. ECD 88095.
- Janáček Philharmonic Orchestra, Ostrava, cond. Otakar Trhlík (1986). Janáček: "The Danube" Symphony, Idyll for Strings (CD). Supraphon. 33CO-1150.
- Brno State Philharmonic Orchestra, cond. František Jílek (1993). Janáček: Complete Orchestral Works (CD). Supraphon. 11 1834 2033.
- Deutsches Musikschulorchester, cond. Jörg-Peter Weigle (1994). Elgar, Janáček, Shostakowitsch, Šuk (CD). Ars Musici. AM 1128-2.
- London Festival Orchestra, cond. Ross Pople (1995). Leoš Janáček: Idyll, Mládí, Suite for String Orchestra (CD). Arte Nova Classics. 74321 30501 2.
- Norwegian Chamber Orchestra, cond. Iona Brown (2000). Bartók: Divertimento; Janáček: Idyll, Suite For String Orchestra (CD). Chandos. CHAN 9816.
- Südwestdeutsches Kammerorchester Pforzheim, cond. Vladislav Czarnecki (n.d.). Portrait (CD). Ebs. EBS 6042.
