= Ballad of Blaník =

1920 composition by Leoš Janáček

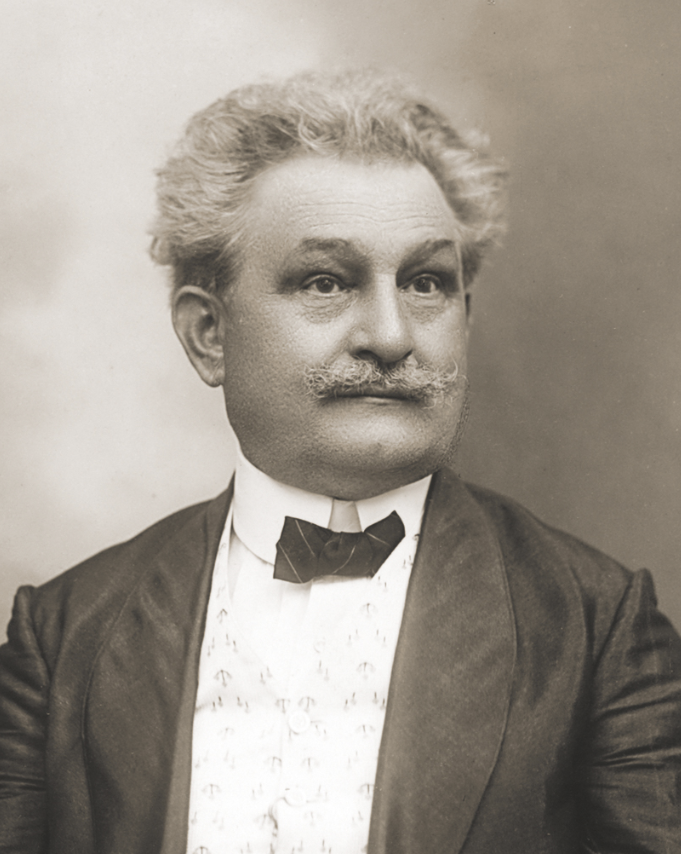
Leoš Janáček in 1914

Ballad of Blaník (Czech: Balada Blanická), originally titled The Knights of Blaník (Czech: Blaničtí rytíři), is a symphonic poem composed in 1920 by Leoš Janáček, based on a text by Jaroslav Vrchlický. It was Janáček's third symphonic poem. The piece is written in the key of A♭ minor. Its première was in Brno on 21 March 1920.

== Background ==
The work was dedicated to Tomáš Garrigue Masaryk, the President of Czechoslovakia at the time, who had been a strong supporter of independence; Czechoslovakia had become an independent nation in 1918, the year before Janáček began his composition.

== Composition ==
Janáček used as his source text a narrative poem by Jaroslav Vrchlický, from his Peasant Ballads (Czech: Selské balady), which is based on a Czech legend about a small army sleeping in the mountain of Blaník. Other Czech composers had previously been inspired by this legend, including Bedřich Smetana, who concluded his Má vlast set of symphonic poems with a piece named 'Blaník', and Zdeněk Fibich, who composed an opera with the same title. Vrchlický, however, had given the legend a unique pacifist twist. According to the original legend, the army will awake and kill enemies of the Czechs in a time of trouble. In Vrchlický's utopian version of the tale, the army remains asleep because weapons have been eradicated. The poem was printed in full in the original score.

Hugh MacDonald has stated that, in common with Janáček's other symphonic poems, there is "very little connection" between the original poem and Janáček's music and that although "some of the music can be interpreted to fit the poem, with a certain licence, [...] much remains obscure". This is particularly true after the first 75 bars. According to MacDonald's analysis, Janáček seems to have used the poem as a springboard to composing a symphonic movement, rather than composing a piece that reflects the message and content of the original text.

== Arrangements ==
1. Arrangement suitable for: orchestra
  - arrangement for: wind orchestra
  - arrangement by: Karel Bělohoubek
  - performed by: Czech Army Central Band, co Karel Bělohoubek
