= Jason Wright Wingate =

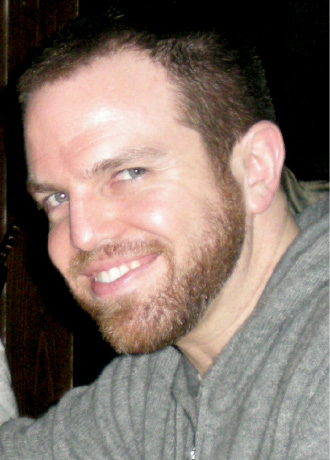
Jason Wright Wingate at The Stone, New York City, 2008.

Jason Wright Wingate (born December 12, 1971, in Fort Collins, Colorado) is an American composer, cellist and poet. Notable works include the chamber work Landscapes of Consciousness, and the Symphony No. 2: Kleetüden; Variationen für Orchester nach Paul Klee (Variations for Orchestra after Paul Klee), as well as a transcription of Modest Mussorgsky's Pictures at an Exhibition for orchestra, chorus and organ.

== Key works ==
- Orchestration of Mussorgsky’s Pictures at an Exhibition (2003)
- Landscapes of Consciousness (2005)
- Symphony No. 1: Mythopoesis for 13 cellos (2007)
- Symphony No. 2: Kleetüden; Variationen für Orchester nach Paul Klee (Variations for Orchestra after Paul Klee) (2009)
- Symphony No. 3: Pi (2020)
- String Quartet No. 1: Three Dodecaphonic Meditations (2020)
- Wind Quintet No. 1: Thirteen Self-Portraits (2020)
- Wind Quintet No. 2: Five Noumena (2022)
