= Lachian Dances =

Set of compositions by Leóš Janáček

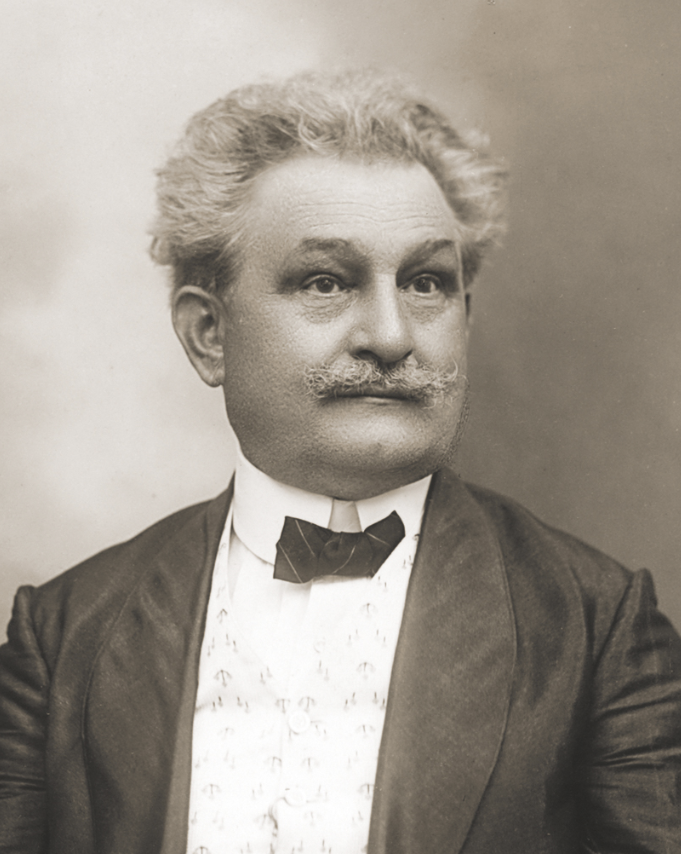
Leoš Janáček in 1914

The Lachian Dances (in Czech: Lašské tance) was the first mature work by the Czech composer Leoš Janáček. Originally titled Wallachian Dances after the Moravian Wallachia region, Janáček later changed the title when the region's name also changed, since it reflects folk songs from that specific area.

== Background ==
Janáček began to compose the first set of instrumental arrangements of folk dances in 1888. The first performance took place on 11 January 1889 in Olomouc. The composition was reworked again in 1925, when Janáček made a new selection and ordering of numbers, including some changes in instrumentation. The work was printed in 1928, shortly before Janáček's death, by Hudební matice in Prague.

== Structure ==
The work is split into six separate dances:

1. Starodávný ("the Ancient One"), which starts with a bright 3/4 feel that moves quickly to introduce the first melody, played by the first violin. In this movement, the melodies are based around two Lachian dances, the "real dance" and the "ribbon" or "club dance". After the opening melody, the piece finds itself in a 2/4 allegro for the second half of the ribbon dance that is a common feature of Moravian music. This effect is repeated a number of times before drawing the dance to a close.
2. Požehnaný ("the Blessed"), in which one can see where Janáček took his inspiration from. The opening theme is played and then repeated throughout the whole movement, a trait that was considered essential in all Moravian dances.
3. Dymák, which portrays a blacksmith at work, with strong on beats mimicking the hammer striking hot steel. This movement also increases tempo considerably over the preceding two dances, starting at an allegro but increasing to prestissimo to indicate the hot and industrious work.
4. Starodávný II, which is clearly influenced by Dvořák by the use of orchestration, mood and writing. The melody itself is a version of a folk tune from the Bartoš collection and, although similar to the opening dance, varies slightly. This dance is also a lot slower compared to the opening and keeps a regular tempo through to the end helping maintain its grace.
5. Čeladenský, which was considered by Janáček to be exactly what a typical Czech dance should consist of in form, expression as well as style. The name is derived from the Lachian village Čeladná. Again, it uses the opening theme repeated in some form throughout the piece. As the piece progresses, this original theme is dovetailed with a second melody before two other melodies join the melee, which leads to a bright and lively end.
6. Pilky signifies the peasant's hurried preparations for the onset of winter where all of the firewood has to be sawed and stored. This final movement is in three very distinct sections: First, an andante con moto for the opening theme while the second, marked Più mosso is a bright flighty dance. The tempo is increased before returning to the original tempo and original theme but only to be built up again for a climactic finish.

== Arrangements ==
1. Arrangement suitable for: orchestra
  - arrangement for: wind orchestra
  - arrangement by: Karel Bělohoubek
  - performed by: Czech Army Central Band, co Karel Bělohoubek
2. Arrangement suitable for: orchestra
  - arrangement by: Hynek Sluka
  - performed by: Prague Castle Guard and Police Wind Orchestra, co Rudolf Rydval
3. Arrangement suitable for: orchestra
  - arrangement by: Karel Bělohoubek, Jaroslav Šíp, Viliam Béreš
  - performed by: Czech Army Central Band, cond. Vladimír Válek

== See also ==
- Lach dialects
