= Symphony No. 5½ =

Comic symphony by Don Gillis

The Symphony No. 5½, A Symphony for Fun, is an orchestral symphony written in 1946 by the American composer Don Gillis.

Gillis, a prolific composer, had already written five symphonies when he embarked on this work's composition. He stated that he originally set out to write his sixth symphony, but found that the music emerged so light-hearted in character that rather than give the symphony a conventional number he elected to publish it as no. 5½.

The work is in four movements, the titles being punning references to the usual forms found in corresponding movements of "serious" symphonies.

1. Perpetual emotion
2. Spiritual?
3. Scherzophrenia
4. Conclusion!

The symphony was first performed in May 1947 by the Boston Pops Orchestra conducted by Arthur Fiedler. Four months later, in September, the work received its first radio broadcast performance with Arturo Toscanini conducting the NBC Symphony Orchestra.
