= Don Gillis (composer) =

American composer

Donald Eugene Gillis (June 17, 1912 – January 10, 1978) was an American composer, conductor, teacher, and radio producer. The composition that has gained him most recognition is his orchestral Symphony No. 5½, A Symphony for Fun.

== Biography ==
Gillis was born in Cameron, Missouri. His family moved to Fort Worth, Texas, and he studied at Texas Christian University, playing trombone and acting as assistant director of the university band. He graduated in 1935, and obtained a master's degree from North Texas State University in 1943.

He became production director for the radio station WBAP, later moving to NBC where he became producer for the NBC Symphony Orchestra during the tenure of its conductor Arturo Toscanini. He held several teaching posts at academic institutions in the southern United States during his career, and also helped to found the Symphony of the Air orchestra. Gillis produced several NBC radio programs, including Serenade to America and NBC Concert Hour. After Toscanini retired in 1954, Gillis, serving as president of the Symphony Foundation of America, was instrumental in helping to form the Symphony of the Air, using members of the old NBC Symphony. Gillis also produced the radio program Toscanini: The Man Behind the Legend, which ran for several years on NBC after the Italian conductor's death.

In 1973 he joined the faculty of the University of South Carolina where he founded, and was chairman of, the Institute for Media Arts and was instrumental in establishing the Instructional Services Center. Dr. Gillis also served as USC's composer-in-residence until his death.

He died in Columbia, South Carolina, on January 10, 1978. His papers and an extensive collection of recorded material are housed at the University of North Texas in Denton.

== Music ==
Despite his administrative responsibilities, Gillis was a prolific composer, writing ten orchestral symphonies, tone poems like Portrait of a Frontier Town, piano concertos, rhapsodies for harp and orchestra, and six string quartets. He also composed a wide variety of band music. Gillis is best remembered as the composer of his Symphony No. 5½, A Symphony for Fun, originally performed by Arturo Toscanini and the NBC Symphony Orchestra during a September 21, 1947, broadcast concert that Gillis also produced; it was preserved on transcription discs but not commercially issued. Since 2005, his symphonies have been recorded on the Albany Records label.

Gillis sought to interpret contemporary American culture musically. His music drew upon popular material, particularly emphasizing jazz, which he considered a revitalizing element in American music. He assimilated popular influences in a simple and straightforward style aimed at communicating with his audiences through an emphasis on clear, accessible, melodic writing. Many of his works are best characterized as fun and full of humor.

== Chronological list of principal compositions ==
- 1936 String Quartet 1
- 1937 The Panhandle, symphonic suite for orchestra
- 1937 The Crucifixion, cantata
- 1937 The Woolyworm, for orchestra
- 1937 Thoughts Provoked on Becoming a Prospective Papa, symphonic suite
- 1937 The Raven, after Edgar Allan Poe, for narrator and orchestra
- 1938 Suite 1 for Wind Quintet
- 1939 Suite 2 for Wind Quintet
- 1939 Suite 3 for Wind Quintet
- 1939–40 Symphony 1, An American Symphony
- 1940 Intermission – Ten Minutes, symphonic sketch for orchestra
- 1940 Portrait of a Frontier Town, for orchestra
- 1940 Symphony 2, Symphony of Faith
- 1940–41 Symphony 3, A Symphony for Free Men
- 1941 The Night Before Christmas, for narrator and orchestra
- 1942 Three Sketches, for strings
- 1943 Prairie Poem, tone poem
- 1943 Symphony 4, The Pioneers
- 1944 The Alamo, tone poem
- 1944 A Short Overture to an Unwritten Opera, for orchestra
- 1944–45 Symphony 5, In Memoriam
- 1945 To An Unknown Soldier, tone poem
- 1945 This Is Our America, cantata
- 1945–46 Symphony 5½, A Symphony for Fun
- 1946 Rhapsody for harp and orchestra
- 1947 Dude Ranch, tone poem
- 1947 String Quartet 6
- 1947 Symphony 6, Mid-Century USA
- 1948 Symphony 7, Saga of the Prairie School
- 1949 Shindig, ballet in 7 episodes for orchestra
- 1950 Symphony 8, A Dance Symphony
- 1950 Tulsa, a symphonic portrait in oil, for orchestra
- 1951 Symphony 9, Star-Spangled Symphony
- 1954 The Coming of The King, for chorus
- 1956 Piano Concerto 1, Encore Concerto
- 1956 Pep-Rally, opera for band
- 1957 The Park Avenue Kids, opera
- 1957 Five Acre Pond, for oboe and orchestra
- 1958 The Libretto, opera
- 1958 Men of Music, for band
- 1959 The Land of Wheat, suite for band
- 1961–62 The Legend of Star Valley Junction, opera
- 1964 Ceremony of Allegiance, for narrator and band
- 1965 Seven Golden Texts, for narrator voices and orchestra
- 1966 The Gift of the Magi, opera
- 1966 World Premiere, opera
- 1966 Piano Concerto 2
- 1967 Arturo Toscanini, A Portrait of a Century, for narrator and orchestra
- 1967 Symphony X (10), Big D(allas)
- 1967-8 The Nazarene, opera
- 1969 Rhapsody for trumpet and orchestra
- 1973 Behold the Man, opera
- 1976 The Secret History of the Birth of a Nation, for narrator voices and orchestra

== Publications ==
- The Unfinished Symphony Conductor. Pemberton Press (1967). A satirical conducting manual.
- The Art of Media Instruction. Crescendo Book Publications (1973).

== Memberships and affiliations ==
- Phi Mu Alpha Sinfonia

1. Alpha Alpha, 1958 (National Honorary Chapter)
2. Gamma Theta, 1941 (University of North Texas College of Music Chapter)
