= Serenade No. 4 (Mozart) =

1774 composition by W. A. Mozart

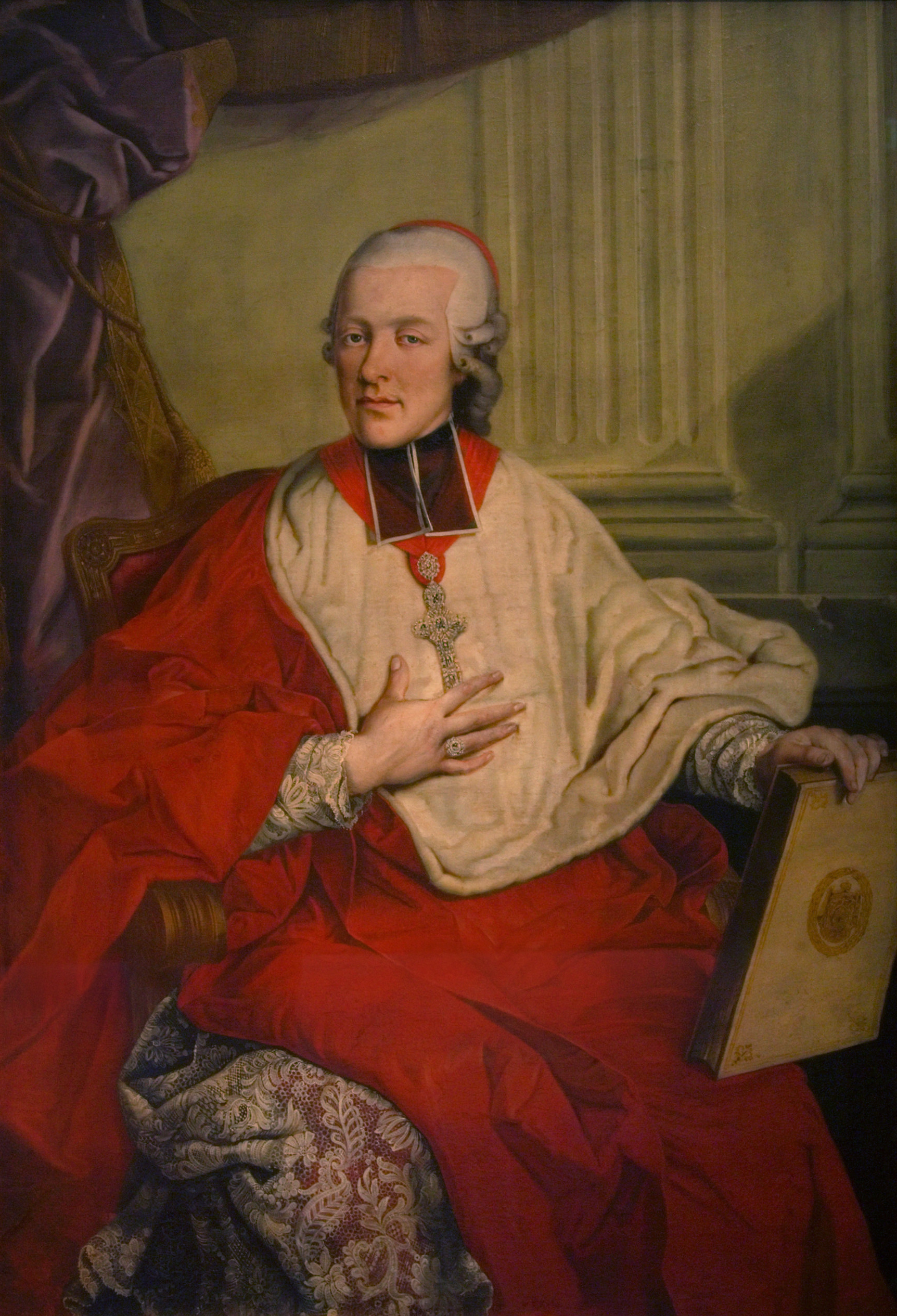
Count Hieronymus von Colloredo, for whom K. 203 is nicknamed

The Serenade No. 4 in D major, K. 203/189b was written in August 1774 by Wolfgang Amadeus Mozart for ceremonies at the University of Salzburg. It is nicknamed Colloredo after Mozart's patron, Count Hieronymus von Colloredo. The work is very similar to the serenade K. 204 composed for Salzburg the following summer.

== Structure ==
The serenade is scored for two oboes (doubling flutes), bassoon, two horns, two trumpets and strings.

There are eight movements:

1. Andante maestoso – Allegro assai
2. [Andante]
3. Menuetto and Trio
4. [Allegro]
5. Menuetto and Trio
6. [Andante]
7. Menuetto
8. Prestissimo

The March in D, K. 237/189c, was used as an introduction or exit for this work.

The second, third and fourth movements all feature the solo violin prominently, forming a three-movement violin concerto within the serenade. This is similar to the K. 204 serenade from the following year. These movements are set apart from the rest of the serenade by their choice of keys (B♭ major, F major, B♭ major).

The trio of the second minuet features an independent solo bassoon part.

Like most of his orchestral serenades, a symphony was arranged from a subset of the serenade's movements. The "Serenade Symphony" for this work consists of movements one, six, seven and eight.

Music from this composition, and from "Il mio tesoro", is used in Kind Hearts and Coronets (1949).
