= Symphony No. 7 (Williamson) =

Australian composer Malcolm Williamson wrote his Symphony No. 7 in 1984 to a joint commission from the Chamber Youth Strings of Melbourne and the State of Victoria, Australia. It was written mostly at the composer's home in Sandon, Hertfordshire, England.

== History of the Work ==
Williamson was commissioned to write his Seventh Symphony by Dr Alexandra E. Cameron in 1984 on behalf of the Chamber Youth Strings of Melbourne. The piece originally had a dual purpose: to celebrate the 150th anniversary of the State of Victoria, and to give the youth orchestra a showpiece to take on a European tour in 1985. Williamson enjoyed long and fruitful relationships with youth orchestras and other organisations throughout his long career, and also wrote his Symphony No. 5 Aquerò, the Little Mass of St. Bernadette and the ballet Heritage for young players, singers and dancers respectively. The score is dedicated to the memory of a long-time friend of Williamson's who died a year after the work's composition, Dr. Derek Goldfoot, husband of soprano Sybil Michelow (a staunch advocate of Williamson's vocal music).

The first performance of the symphony was planned for 10 January 1985 at Australia House in London, but in the event only three of the four movements were played (the scherzo was omitted). This was due to the challenging nature of the music, which meant it was not possible for the youth orchestra to rehearse all the movements sufficiently in time. The first complete performance of the symphony was given by the Chamber Youth Strings of Melbourne in the Irving Hall of the Lauriston Girls' School, Melbourne, on 12 August 1985.

== Notes on the Symphony ==
Since part of the commission for the Symphony No. 7 was to celebrate the 150th anniversary of The State of Victoria, Williamson decided to take Australian landscape and culture as the basis of his symphony, not unlike the Symphony No. 6 of 1982. Although each movement has a separate impetus behind it, the whole work is unified by the idea of (in the composer's words) "the unforeseen cross-pollination of ethnic groups that has enriched Australian life". This "cross-pollination" is represented by a portrait of the Kelly Gang in the first movement (illuminating the strong Irish connection), Macedonian dances in the scherzo (highlighting the thriving Macedonian community of Melbourne), and further Yugoslavian references in the finale. A celebration of the vivid landscape of Victoria is most overt in the introverted third movement, an eight-minute lament of great poise capturing the majesty of the Dandenongs and Wilsons Promontory.

== Structure ==
The symphony is broken up into four clearly defined movements, as follows:

1. Andante – Allegro vivo – Andante
2. Allegro molto
3. Andante
4. Allegro maestoso ma non troppo

== Orchestration ==
Williamson's Seventh Symphony requires the least resources of all his symphonies. Unlike the massive orchestral Sixth Symphony Liturgy of Homage (1982) or the choral-orchestral Third Symphony The Icy Mirror of 1973, the Seventh Symphony is scored for string orchestra only (consisting of violins, violas, celli and double basses). This gives the work its unique sense of chamber-like intimacy.

== Recordings ==
- SIGNUM CLASSICS: Brunel Ensemble, conducted by Christopher Austin
