= Symphony No. 2: Kleetüden =

The Symphony No. 2: Kleetüden; Variationen für Orchester nach Paul Klee (Variations for Orchestra after Paul Klee) by Jason Wright Wingate was completed in 2009 and consists of 27 movements, each depicting a painting or drawing by Paul Klee. In form, the movements are also variations on a musical theme based on the letters of the artist's name, each taking its title from the Klee work referenced.

The Symphony's movements, with English translation of titles followed by tempo markings, are as follows:

1. Bewegung der Gewölbe ("Movement of the Vaulted Chambers") - Andante gotico
2. Furcht vor Verdoppelung ("Fear of Becoming Double") - Vivace misurato
3. Eros ("Eros") - Grave libidinoso
4. Die Zwitschermaschine ("The Twittering Machine") - Allegro meccanico
5. Gelehrter ("Scholar") - Lento con moto
6. Flucht vor sich [erstes Stadium] ("Flight from Oneself [First State]") - Prestissimo
7. Einsiedelei ("Hermitage") - Larghetto introspettivo
8. Der Tod für die Idee ("Death for an Idea") - Vivace portentoso
9. Zwillinge ("Twins") - Allegro compiaciuto
10. Seltsamer Garten ("Strange Garden") - Largo germogliare
11. Rechnender Greis ("Old Man Counting") - Andante calcolazione
12. Fatales Fagott Solo ("Fatal Bassoon Solo") - Allegretto sinistro
13. Uhrpflanzen ("Clock-plants") - Adagietto cronologico
14. Fuge in Rot ("Fugue in Red") - Moderato rossastro
15. Regen ("Rain") - Allegretto spruzzatina
16. Paukenspieler ("Kettledrummer") - Grave morboso
17. Ein Stückchen Eden ("A Fragment of Eden") - Andantino innocente
18. Mit den beiden Verirrten ("With the Two Lost Ones") - Lento ansioso
19. Leidende Frucht ("Suffering Fruit") - Lento antropomorfismo
20. Ausgang der Menagerie ("Outing of the Menagerie") - Vivace zoologico
21. Mädchen in Trauer ("Girl in Mourning") - Andante addolorato
22. Schwarzer Fürst ("Black Prince") - Allegro bellicoso
23. Gestirne über dem Tempel ("The Firmament Above the Temple") - Larghissimo contemplativo
24. Katze und Vogel ("Cat and Bird") - Andantino desideroso
25. Anatomie der Aphrodite ("Anatomy of Aphrodite") - Allegretto cubista
26. Die Schlangengöttin und ihr Feind ("The Snake Goddess and Her Foe") - Con moto mitologico
27. Ad Parnassum ("To Parnassus") - Allegro trascendente
