= The Wandering of a Little Soul =

Violin concerto by Leoš Janáček

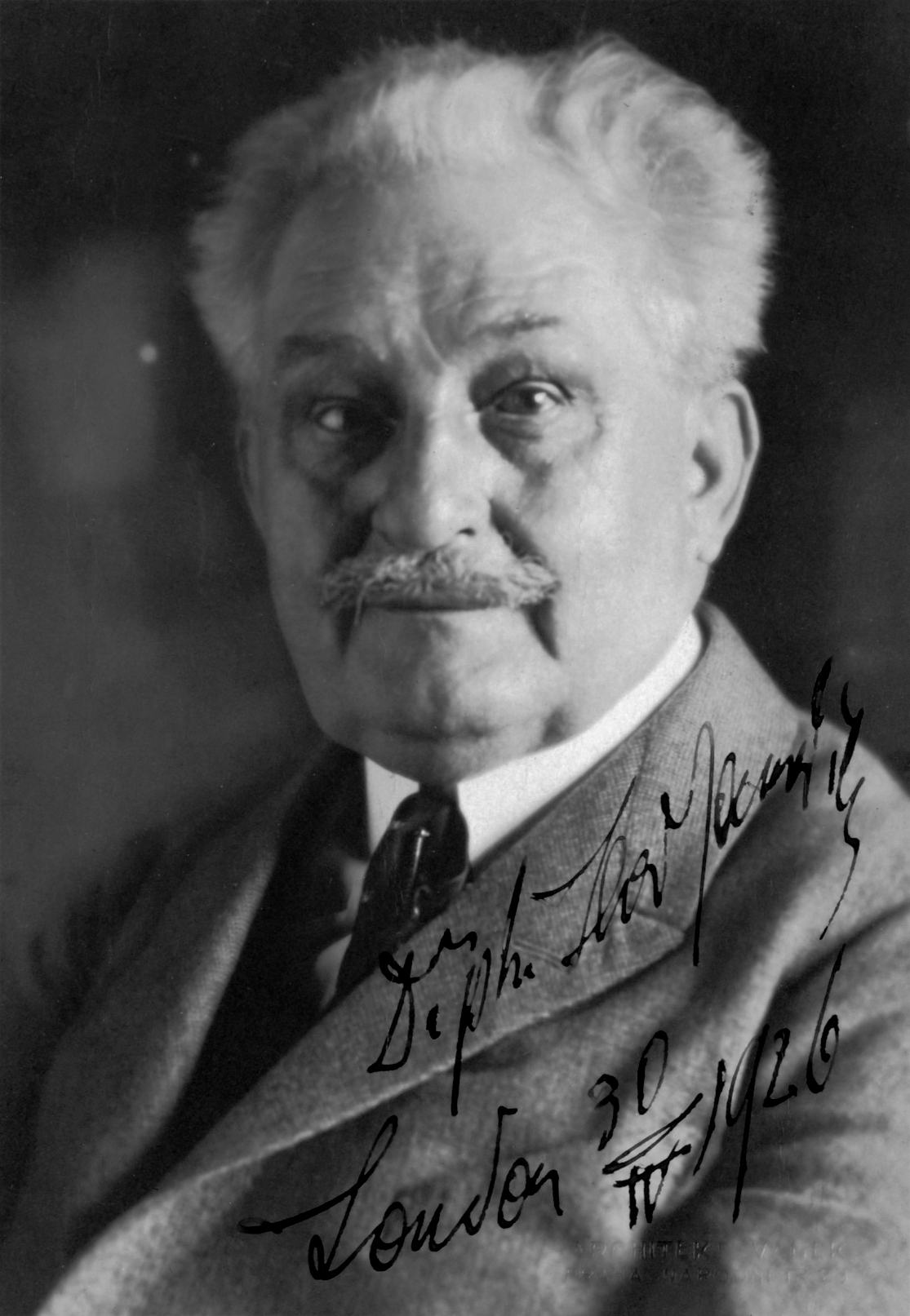
Leoš Janáček in 1926

The Wandering of a Little Soul (Czech: Putování dušičky) is a violin concerto by the Czech composer Leoš Janáček. The work is also known in English as "Pilgrimage of a Little Soul", "Pilgrimage of a Dear Soul" or simply as "Pilgrimage of the Soul". Nevertheless, the English title adopted in the complete critical edition of the composer's works is "The Wandering of a Little Soul".

== Background ==
Janáček started to write the concerto in 1926, during his visit to England. The work remained unfinished, and today there are three sources containing the body of the composition. None of the manuscripts are dated. The sketched material of the concerto is concentrated in one movement only (12–15 min. duration). The score has a few remarks: p. 29 – inscription "in a human being", p. 30 – "the dear soul inborn in every human being", p. 40 – "eagle", p. 49 – "without the soul until the end", p. 64 – "instruments die out".

In 1927 Janáček abandoned the idea of the concerto and used some of its material in the opera From the House of the Dead, particularly in the suite. In 1928, the year of his death, Janáček composed also incidental music to Schluck und Jau, a play by the German dramatist Gerhart Hauptmann, which contains violin solos closely related to motives known from The Wandering of a Little Soul.

Miloš Štědroň and Leoš Faltus completed the composition in 1988. The first performance took place on September 29, 1988, in the Janáček Theatre in Brno, with Jan Stanovský on violin, Petr Vronský conducted the State Philharmonic of Brno.

Even though the concerto remained unfinished, it contains several interesting examples of Janáček's mature style.

== Selected recordings ==
- Janáček: Wandering of the Little Soul, Sinfonietta... Supraphon 1989 (Josef Suk – violin)
- Janáček: Sinfonietta, Violin Concerto... Supraphon 1992 (Ivan Ženatý – violin)
- Janáček: Sinfonietta, Violin Concerto, Taras Bulba, Overture from "From the House of Death" ... Virgin 1992 (Christian Tetzlaff – violin)
- Janáček: Sinfonietta, Violin Concerto, Suite from "The Cunning Little Vixen"... Arte Nova 1995 (Christiane Edinger – violin)
- Berg/Janáček/Hartmann: Violin Concertos... TELDEC 1995 (Thomas Zehetmair – violin)
- Janáček: Orchestral Works, Volume 2... Chandos 2015 (James Ehnes – violin)
