= Concerto da camera (Jeffrey Ching) =

2008 musical composition by Jeffrey Ching

Concerto da camera is a composition for solo guitar, solo violoncello, soprano, and twenty strings, by the contemporary Chinese-British composer Jeffrey Ching.

== Analysis ==
The composer describes the composition as a ‘quintuple concerto’ for the five nationalities of its original begetters: German for the guitarist Reinbert Evers; Lithuanian for his wife, the pianist Igina Mauzaite (although the concerto never included a piano part); Brazilian for the ‘cellist Matias de Oliveira Pinto; the Spanish ancestry of the composer’s wife, the soprano Andión Fernández; and the composer’s own Chinese parentage. Composed in Berlin between 2 March and 2 July 2008 and revised in 2011-2012, the concerto is about half an hour in duration, and divides into a slow and a quick movement, in each of which the five musical races combine in diverse ways:

The opening "Passacaglia à la sarabande" alternates three statements of a “V-I-L-N-I-U-S” motto (A-A-E-G-A-G-E^{b}) with three presentations of the Sarabande from J. S. Bach’s Fifth Suite for unaccompanied ‘cello (BWV 1011), each incorporating some figurative or abstract representation of a national element: sheng-type chords, quotations of zither music, and poetic fragments from mediaeval China; the rhythms and harmonies of Brazilian indigenous and popular music; the dissonant polyphony, nonsense syllables, and wide vocal glissandi of the Lithuanian sutartines; and in the optional soprano solo at the movement’s core, some Spanish lines from the Miguel de Cervantes novel Don Quixote.

The concluding "Fuga concertante" exactly doubles the proportions of the finale of J. S. Bach’s Fourth Brandenburg Concerto (BWV 1049), as well as literally doubling its contrapuntal premise into a double fugue on two Lithuanian folk songs. As in the Bach, the fugal ritornelli are interspersed with elaborate cadenzas for the instrumental soloists, in one place in the form of the actual tracing on the guitar and ‘cello fingerboards of the Chinese brushstrokes for the ideographs for ‘broken string’. Where the movement divides at the Golden ratio, the string players stand and slash the air with their bows, to announce a structural demarcation usually left concealed by composers. During the fifth ritornello, the soprano’s first movement solo recurs in fragmentary guise as a wordless vocalise, so that in this movement the Spanish as well as Chinese presence survives only in allusive form. On the other hand, the Afro-Brazilian elements come into their own as a candomblé ceremony in miniature, the ethnomusicologically documented drumming, cowbell, and clapping effects all mimicked by the string orchestra and solo guitar without any actual percussion. The concerto ends with the dense Baroque counterpoint of solo guitar and ‘cello unwinding into silence like a rundown motor, by means of well-coordinated coups de grâce administered to the soloists’ tuning pegs by three players from the orchestra.

== Premiere ==
As a result of the Audience Prize awarded to the composer's opera Das Waisenkind for the 2009-10 season, the work was premiered by the Erfurt Philharmonic under Walter Gugerbauer in Theater Erfurt on 19–20 January 2012. The soloists were Reinbert Evers (guitar), Matias de Oliveira Pinto (violoncello), and Andión Fernández (soprano).

== Reception ==
Critical reception was divided, one review stating baldly, "Musik ist es nicht", but another was more enthusiastic:

Jeffrey Ching – born in 1965 in the [former] Spanish-American colony of the Philippines, the son of Chinese Buddhist parents – presents himself in his musical work as a wanderer between cultures. The pieces of the composer, who in 2009 won the Audience Prize for The Orphan in Theater Erfurt, are filled with musical elements of the cultures that influence him. Likewise, the two movements of his Concerto da Camera are filled with Chinese, Spanish, Brazilian, but also Lithuanian, musical cultures. For unpracticed listeners, even for those with some characteristic musical quotations of these countries in mind, it turned out to be a demanding task to identify them. Both the string orchestra and the soloists on guitar and cello were given special tasks: Performers are rarely to be seen blowing into the sound holes of their instruments; the entire ensemble was to be heard speaking archaic sounds or playing on the music stands instead of the violins. Jeffrey Ching certainly intended some sort of musical irony here and there, but the serious composer and his virtuoso ability always emerged. Tearing at the strings aroused associations with China. Folksong elements conjured up images of Memel villages. String players knocked percussive Latin American rhythms on their instruments. And there was always a conscious allusion to the music of Bach: counterpoint and polyphony in dissonant and abstracted form. The musicologist in any case took pleasure in decipherment; the enthusiast of contemporary orchestral music, in the provocation onstage and the musical wink of the creator".
