= Symphony No. 4, "Souvenir des Ming" =

Jeffery Ching's 4th symphony

Souvenir des Ming is the title of Jeffrey Ching's Fourth Symphony, which was composed in London between 14 January and 29 June 2002, and is in a single large movement lasting about thirty-five minutes. There is a further parenthetical title, Passacaglia and Fugue on Ming dynasty Fragments, which describes the actual thematic content and form of the work. In China the work is known as Minglü huiyin 明律回音 (Echo of the Ming Pitch-pipes).

== World premiere and instrumentation ==
Souvenir des Ming was commissioned by the Jeunesses Musicales World Youth Orchestra, and premiered at the Shanghai International Arts Festival on 17 November 2006 by the Shanghai Philharmonic Orchestra under Dmitri Jurowski. It is scored for a large orchestra consisting of 2 piccolos, 3 flutes, 3 oboes, English horn, E flat clarinet, 3 clarinets, bass clarinet, 3 bassoons, double bassoon, 4 horns, 4 trumpets, 3 trombones, bass trombone, tuba, timpani, 6 percussionists, 2 harps, celesta, and 60 strings.

== Analysis of form and structure ==
=== The theme ===
In form, the symphony is a passacaglia with eight variations and 105-part fugue on Ming (1368–1644) or Ming-style melodic fragments, such as may be found in the temple hymns transcribed in Joseph S. C. Lam's State Sacrifices and Music in Ming China (1998). The fragments link up as the complete Theme in G minor, eight phrases of four notes each, variously orchestrated. Then follow the eight variations of the passacaglia:

=== The passacaglia ===
- Variation I. Against the 60-part imitative figures in the strings, the Theme is heard twice, first forwards then backwards.
- Variation II. The imitative texture thins down for flutter-tongued flutes, oboes, and 'cellos, under a shimmer of tremolando string chords, to which clarinets and bassoons add rapid, light arpeggios.
- Variation III. Two-bar phrases for lower brass and lower strings alternate with single-bar phrases for high pizzicati and winds.
- Variation IV. The Theme, elaborated into fleet 12/32 triplets scherzo-fashion, combines with its own inversion, staccato in the strings, legato in the woodwinds.
- Variation V. Without letup from the ongoing string and woodwind triplets, brass chords restate the Theme in E^{b}, accompanied by a repeatedly broadening rhythm in the percussion. The brass eventually join the ever-thickening triplets in retrograde and retrograde inversion, while the brass chords transfer, in a striking change of texture, to trilling violins in retrograde.
- Variation VI. A 12-tone variation launched by a cadenza for the 2 harps. The row is constructed out of distinctive patterns of the Theme, its 4 forms played in 4 permutations of 4-part counterpoint in oboes, English horns, clarinets, and bass clarinets, and also used to generate durations and dynamics. The harmonic accompaniment on the 2 harps, also serial in derivation, is especially elaborate, involving arpeggios, broken octaves, and full chords in Harp 1, and a complete G minor statement of the Theme in stark octaves in Harp 2, the original intervals somewhat distorted.
- Variation VII. Four times the Theme is given in E minor by the timpani in stately, sarabande tempo. Over it, various counterpoints are heard singly, and then in increasingly dense combinations and scoring. After the quiet, central 'Trio' for flutes, clarinets, glockenspiel, harps, and violins over a timpani roll on low E, the entire sarabande is repeated al rovescio (backwards).
- Variation VIII. A leisurely modulating canon in eight parts begins in C minor on solo double bassoon, and continues through D minor, E^{b} minor, F^{#} minor, B^{b} minor, F minor, E minor, and B^{b} minor.

=== The fugue ===
The eight subjects of the fugue derive from the eight individual phrases of the Theme, and are expounded—in a kind of miniature Art of Fugue—in separate fugatos and fugues before all being combined in ten permutations in invertible counterpoint:

- Fugato I on Subject I (5 parts)—oboes, English horn, bassoon
- Fugato II on Subject II (6 parts)—brass
- Fugato III on Subject III (4 parts)—piccolos and flutes
- Fugato IV on Subject IV (4 parts)—horns and tuba
- Fughetta I on Subject V (4 parts)—clarinets
- Fughetta II on Subject VI (4 parts)—bassoons
- Fugue I on Subject VII (4 parts)—harps and celesta
- Fugue II on Subject VIII, and then also I-VII (54 parts)—tutti, starting with solo violins and glockenspiel
- Fugue III on Subjects I-VIII (105 parts)—tutti, with aleatory stretto after the 10th permutation, over which the Theme is superimposed by two trumpets and trombone playing from an auditorium balcony, while within the orchestra proper each player is directed to play earlier fugal material in any order at will.

=== The role of fractals ===
The composition is dominated by fractal number series, preponderantly the Lucas (1, 3, 4, 7, 11...1364), but occasionally also the Fibonacci (1, 2, 3, 5, 8...), sequences in which each term is the sum of the previous two. Variants are created by simple multiplication, e.g., Lucas x 3, which produces the new series 3, 9, 12, 21... All these are used to generate the precise duration of each variation (so that each lasts the added lengths of the previous two), most of the vertical and horizontal patterns (since the numbers may be made to correspond to pitches, ascending or descending, played successively or as chords), and also many of the rhythmic motifs.

Another fractal value, the Golden Section, demarcates the end of the passacaglia and the beginning of the fugue. (The Golden Section is the point at which the ratio of the remaining area to the larger one preceding, is the same as the ratio of the larger area to the whole.)

The Lucas series determines that, in general, each fugato or fugue is in length the sum of the preceding two. In the last two fugues, the keys and octave registers of the principal subject entries follow the Lucas series, while the accretion of parts in Fugue II (from one to fifty-four) follows the Fibonacci aggregates.

== Historical allusions ==
Ching remarks of this piece:

Souvenir des Ming links fractal geometry and musical chinoiserie only insofar as fractals are said to be natural, organic, non-Euclidean characteristics of Chinese art and philosophy. On the other hand, the symphony’s gradual, unmistakable progression from Modernist to Baroque—an atypical experiment in stylistic retrogression within a single movement—is a conscious homage to the great Ming musicologist Zhu Zaiyu 朱載堉, Prince of Zheng (1536–1611), whose 390th death anniversary it was in 2001. In 1584 Zhu published his mathematics of equal temperament (itself a fractal number series), with a woodcut illustration of a tuning instrument he had had built on its principles. He is, therefore, a patron saint of sorts to European classical music from at least J. S. Bach (born 74 years after the prince’s death) onwards. And though we now know "Wohltemperierte" to be not synonymous with "equal-tempered", nevertheless it is from The Well-Tempered Clavier that we have come to date the practical interchangeability of the twelve tonalities. For this reason, Souvenir des Ming strives for its apotheosis through the 'Ming music' par excellence of the Bach fugue. Twice it parades its Baroque antecedents via the time-honoured circle of fifths sans Pythagorean comma—first, all the way down all twelve steps midway through Fugue II, and then all the way up towards the final aleatory stretto, in a juggernaut of cumulative four-bar phrases.

== Critical reception ==
The Hong Kong music critic Zhou Fanfu wrote in the Hong Kong Economic Journal:

The work's orchestration and fugal counterpoint show technical maturity, its tone-colours are rich, the tranquil and nostalgic beginning gradually and very naturally rising to a climax of great emotional turbulence... This impetuous and opportunely contrived "chaos" exactly reflects the sufferings of modern man. When the not very long-lived climax of this chaos recedes, it brings in its wake tones that are peaceful and hazy, an elevated state of mind. This coda, then, is the real climax of the whole work and its point of repose.
In an age when we must confront the culture of the global village, in the case of Jeffrey Ching...the culture of China is not merely the artefacts of her literature and art, but a metaphysical spirit and the germ of artistic creation.
