= Fronimo =

Fronimo may refer to:

- Fronimo (software), a software program for engraving of tabulature
- Fronimo Dialogo, a book by Vincenzo Galilei
