= Horologia sinica =

Composition by Jeffrey Ching

Horologia sinica (渾天昏君) is a composition by the contemporary Chinese-British composer Jeffrey Ching. It was commissioned by the Hong Kong Chinese Orchestra, who premiered it under Yan Huichang on 6 March 2012 during the 40th Hong Kong Arts Festival at a concert marking the fiftieth anniversary of Hong Kong City Hall. The soprano soloist was Andión Fernández. The piece lasts approximately twenty minutes.

== Title and analysis ==
"Horologia sinica" means "Chinese clocks" in Latin. The Chinese title Huntian hunjun「渾天昏君」is an untranslatable pun on huntian (渾天) meaning "astronomical clock", and hunjun (昏君) meaning "foolish ruler".

According to the composer, the first 'clock' is the water-powered astronomical clock-tower built by the court official Su Song (蘇頌) in Kaifeng during the Northern Song dynasty. An ensemble of water sounds, woodblocks, and other unpitched percussion accurately mark the seconds, minutes, quarters, and night-watch (更籌) between 03:57:36 and 04:16:48 at the start of the solar period jingzhe (驚蟄), which in the Gregorian calendar is 6 March, the date of the world premiere in 2012. As the seconds start ticking, an offstage voice sings verses chanted by the 'human cockcrow' (雞人) above the Song palace gates before daybreak.

A second ensemble of high voice, panpipes, ocarinas, membrane flutes, mouth organs, zithers, bells, chimes, and other percussion, play the festive odes 'Yü li' (魚麗) and 'Nan you jia yü' (南有嘉魚) from the ancient Book of Songs (詩經), using melodies, ornaments, orchestration, instrumental ranges, seating plan, accompaniment, and tuning systems documented in Song and later sources. The odes are sung in Late Middle Chinese pronunciation, and conceal a second 'clock' in broad 4/2 superimposed on the rapid 3/4 of the first. "The third ensemble executes a series of quarter-tone glissandi that are geometrically exact musical transcriptions of seven characters from the Song Emperor Huizong's (宋徽宗) 'Slender Gold' calligraphy (瘦金體), chosen to form seven of the eight words of a Tang emperor's verse in praise of a clock: 「制器垂象, 永鑒無惑」. The missing eighth character is replaced by Huizong's imperial cipher, 'First Man Under Heaven' (天下一人). These glissandi are metrically aligned with the first 'clock' in 3/4, but to all intents and purposes come across as completely ametrical. "The 'clocks' start in steady time, gradually accelerate as if mounting in panic, then slowly unwind, a breakdown which finally drags odes, clocks, and signature into silence with it. Emperor Huizong was a great artist, but traditionally denigrated as an incompetent ruler (昏君) responsible for the destruction of his dynasty. The great astronomical clock (渾天) of Kaifeng was dismantled and looted when the city fell to Tartar invaders in 1127."

== Instrumentation ==
The scoring is for 83 musicians playing 2 paixiao, 2 taoxun, 2 dadi, 2 soprano sheng, 2 alto sheng, 1 bass sheng, 2 alto guan (doubling soprano suona 3 and double bass guan), 1 bass guan, 1 guzheng, 1 guqin, 2 xiaoruan, 4 pipa, 4 zhongruan, 1 sanxian, 2 daruan, 8 gaohu, 12 erhu, 8 zhonghu, 8 gehu, 5 digehu, and 7 percussionists playing poured water sounds, water gong, small and large temple bowls, medium and large Chinese drums, small temple block, small and large Chinese woodblocks, suspended Chinese bells, suspended Chinese stone chimes, large wood drum, large pellet drum, bamboo or wood clapper, large guiro, and large Chinese temple drum.

== Critical reception ==
One review stated "Of the nearly 2,100 works to date commissioned by the Hong Kong Chinese Orchestra, it's safe to say that few are as ambitious as Jeffrey Ching's Horologia sinica". The reviewer went on to draw parallels with the polyrhythmic and microtonal experiments of Charles Ives and George Crumb.

Chow Fanfu also reviewed the work in Xianggang xinbao:

The only piece in the first part of the programme, the roughly twenty-minute Horologia sinica, was creativity of the highest order, revealing the multi-cultural background of [its composer] Jeffrey Ching...and in particular the intellectual fruit of his researches into Chinese history.

...As the printed programme note points out, the time between 03:57:30 and 04:16:40 during the solar period jingzhe of the Chinese calendar works out to the twenty-odd-minute duration of the piece; but further, jingzhe generally falls on 6th March of the Gregorian calendar (though a day late this year), which was the date of this concert, so evidently the date on which the commissioned piece was to be premiered itself became a source of inspiration for the piece.

...For his first composition employing a large-scale ensemble of Chinese instruments, Ching seems to have assumed the role of cool spectator, or historiographer. One doesn't hear a big emotional palette in the entirety of this work, which unchangingly represents the rhythmic passage of time, further reinforcing the historical atmosphere of the whole piece. In the Chinese calendar the solar term jingzhe ["Awakening of Insects"] was the period when Mother Earth was restored to life after the harsh winter, with the dormant beasts and insects all awaking to new vigour. The looting of the astronomical clock, Emperor Song Huizong joining the list of history's "foolish rulers", twenty minutes of "Awakening of Insects"— all are turned into transient historical vicissitude. Finally, the music itself disappears into the silence of the past, as if betraying a sense of the composer's own feelings of helplessness and pity.
