= Glenn Barkley =

Australian artist

- Born: 1972 (age 53–54)
- Occupations: Artist, independent curator and writer
- Writing career
- Subjects: Australian art and culture
- Notable work: Co-founder of Kil.n.it (2015)

Glenn Barkley (born 1972) is an Australian artist, independent curator and writer based in Sydney, Australia. As an artist he is represented by Sullivan+Strumpf, Sydney, Niagara Galleries, Melbourne and Mindy Solomon Gallery, Miami and his works are held in institutional collections such as the National Gallery of Australia, Canberra and Artbank.

Barkley was Senior Curator at the Museum of Contemporary Art Australia (MCA) from 2008 to 2014, and was previously curator of the University of Wollongong Art collection from 1996 to 2008. Between 2007 and 2008 he was Director and curator of the Ergas Collection.

Describing himself as "a fan" of art and artists, Barkley has written extensively on Australian art and culture for Art Monthly, Artist Profile and Art and Australia as well as for numerous catalogues and monographs. He has a diverse area of interest and knowledge including public art; artist books and ephemera; outsider art and other marginal art forms; public and private collection management and development; and horticulture.

== Art practice ==
In 2014 Barkley's ceramic sculptures were included in the exhibition Glazed & Confused: Ceramics in Contemporary Art Practice at Hazelhurst Regional Gallery & Arts Centre in Sydney.

In 2015 Barkley co-founded experimental ceramics studio Kil.n.it in Glebe, Sydney (where he is currently a resident studio artist). Since then he has held solo exhibitions of his ceramics works, including itsallright at Utopia Art, Sydney in 2016, yetmorecontemporaryart at Artspace, Sydney in 2017, and doitdoit at Niagara Galleries, Melbourne in 2017.

In 2015 Barkley's work was displayed by Utopia Art Sydney in the Sydney Contemporary art fair where numerous sales were reported among an increased interest in ceramics.

In 2016 Barkley was included in the Adelaide Biennial of Australian Art: Magic Object curated by Lisa Slade, with an installation influenced by horticulture and the exhibition's theme of the Kunstkabinett. The same year his work was included in a group exhibition Watching Clouds Pass the Moon at Lake Macquarie City Art Gallery, NSW and he collaborated with artist Angela Brennan on the exhibition The Garden of Earthly Delights at West Space, Melbourne.

In 2017 Barkley was a finalist in the Sidney Myer Fund Australian Ceramic Award Exhibition at Shepparton Art Museum, Victoria. The same year his work was shown by Mindy Solomon Gallery at Collective Design Fair, New York .

Barkley's artworks are held in the institutional collections of Artbank, Sydney; Art Gallery of South Australia, Adelaide; National Gallery of Australia, Canberra; Queensland University of Technology, Queensland; Shepparton Art Museum, Victoria; University of Queensland Art Museum, Queensland; University of Wollongong, NSW; and Wollongong City Art Gallery, New South Wales.

=== Critical reception ===
In November 2016 Barkley's work was the subject of a critical essay, Is Glenn Barkley Really the Worst Studio Potter In Australia? by Garth Clark, chief editor of cfile.daily.

== Curatorial work ==
=== Museum of Contemporary Art Australia ===
In 2014, Barkley worked as Consultant Curator (along with Curator Terrie Sultan) on the Museum of Contemporary Art Australia's staging of the travelling exhibition Chuck Close: Prints, Process, Collaboration. In 2013 Barkley curated string theory: Focus on Australian contemporary art, a survey of Australian Indigenous textile and fibre arts. In the same year he curated South of No North: Laurence Aberhart, William Eggleston and Noel McKenna.

In 2012, Barkley co-curated As If, a retrospective of the work of Australian painter Ken Whisson, with Lesley Harding of Heide Museum of Modern Art Melbourne. The same year, he also curated Volume One: MCA Collection, the first exhibition of the MCA collection to take place in its newly renovated and expanded premises. In the process of researching this exhibition, Barkley examined every work in the MCA's collection of over 4,000 artworks.

In 2011, Barkley curated a retrospective of New Zealand-born, Berlin-based contemporary artist Michael Stevenson., and also co-curated with Inhye Kim of NMOCA tell me tell me: Australian and Korean Contemporary Art 1976–2011. The latter exhibition toured to the National Museum of Contemporary Art, Seoul, Korea.

2009–10 saw Barkley curate Almanac: The Gift of Ann Lewis AO. As well as the MCA the show toured to venues in Canberra and Wollongong. Other exhibitions Barkley curated at the MCA include Making it New: Focus on Contemporary Australian Art, and avoiding myth & message: Australian artist and the literary world, both in 2009.

In 2006 during his previous role as curator at the University of Wollongong, Barkley curated the exhibition Multiplicity: Prints and Multiples from the Collection of the MCA and the University of Wollongong. This exhibition was presented at the MCA and toured nationally.

=== Other institutions and projects ===
Since leaving the MCA in early 2014, Barkley has undertaken a number of freelance curatorial projects. Now the heart is filled with gold as if it were a purse was curated by Barkley to celebrate Arts Project, Melbourne's 40th anniversary in 2014.

In 2014, Barkley worked with Darwin artist Franck Gohier and hotel group Merivale to curate the Work in Progress Bar at 50 King St Sydney.

Prior to his departure from the MCA Barkley had curated several projects in an independent capacity. On this day alone, an exhibition focused on photography and transformation, was curated for the annual Octopus exhibition at Gertrude Contemporary, Melbourne. "Without Borders: Outsider Art in an Antipodean Context" was co-curated with collector and curator Peter Fay and exhibited at Monash University Museum of Art and Campbelltown Art Centre, Sydney. In another collaboration with Fay, Barkley co-curated with Dr. Deborah Hart the exhibition "Home Sweet Home- Works from the Peter Fay Collection".

In 2014, it was announced that Barkley will be the 2015 Artistic Director of Art Month Sydney, an annual contemporary art festival run by 10 Group.

== Publications and other work ==
In April 2016 Barkley was Guest Editor of the Journal of Australian Ceramics, Volume 55 No.1.

In 2013 Barkley donated his major collection of zines to the State Library of NSW. He has also donated artwork to the University of Wollongong Art Collection and the Penrith Regional Gallery and Lewers Bequest.

Barkley is also known for his work with outsider artists within an Australian context and has published, spoken and curated broadly within this field.

He is also writing a monograph on Singapore-based Australian artist Belinda Fox.

In 2013 Sydney artist McLean Edwards' portrait of Barkley was a finalist in the annual Archibald Prize at the Art Gallery of New South Wales.
