= Terra Kytaorum =

Terra Kytaorum (Land of the Cathayans) is a work for brass ensemble and percussion by the contemporary classical composer Jeffrey Ching. Its subtitle is Souvenir des Yuan, which incorporates it into that composer's series of musical souvenirs based on melodic material from various Chinese dynasties: Souvenir des Tang (1997), Souvenir des Song (1994), and Souvenir des Ming (2002). The present work was completed in London on 31 December 2000.

== World premiere and instrumentation ==
Terra Kytaorum (Souvenir des Yuan) was commissioned by Weltblech (World Brass), who premiered an abridged version in Berlin on 9 January 2001. It is scored for 4 trumpets, horn, 3 trombones, bass trombone, tuba, and 2 percussionists. Played uncut, the complete work, unique in scale in the brass ensemble repertoire, would last over an hour.

== Pseudo-historical background ==
The work is premised on fictitious events from mediaeval history which existed only in the composer's fancy. Ching writes:

The last Mongol emperor to reign in Beijing, heir to the Yuan dynasty of Khubilai Khan, was intrigued by the idea of bringing together the religious music of his many subject peoples in one of the great biannual sacrifices to Confucius. (The Muslims, contemptuous of idolatrous practices, were not ordered to take part.) For the climactic ritual before the spirit tablets of Confucius and his four leading disciples, the emperor, who was an enthusiastic clockmaker (like another famous last ruler, Louis XVI of France), hit upon the idea of the five musical styles overlapping, like the co-ordinated mechanism of clock parts moving at different speeds (section 10 below). The experiment, although opposed by conservative mandarins, had a certain success, and was only spoilt at some points by the screams of the political prisoners being tortured or executed in a nearby suburb—victims of court purges for whom the gentle teachings of Confucius must have seemed an irrelevant hypocrisy.

This pseudo-history is developed into the following fifteen-part musical structure.

== The sections of the work ==
Most of the hymns are preceded by announcements by the third trombone chanting into his instrument from backstage, impersonating a herald speaking in 14th-century Mandarin.

- 1. Intrada—a Manchu drumming pattern (18th century) punctuates the ceremonial entry of the participants
- 2. Fiat (I)—a 12th-century imperial calligraphic sample from the Song dynasty (which the Mongols overthrew) is translated by an exact system of correspondences into musical brushstrokes of sweeping glissandi. The background ticking of the wood block (crotchet/quarter-note = 125) is arithmetically derived from the escapement mechanism of the great Song water-clock of 1092—as if to signify, in Chinese time, that the Song’s "days were numbered".

Then the offstage trombone chants: "Open the [temple] doors!"

- 3. First Hymn for Welcoming the Spirits, arranged in the Korean style (as practised to the present day still using, by a neat coincidence, Yuan dynasty hymns)
- 4. Second Hymn for Welcoming the Spirits, arranged in the ancient Chinese style (as reconstructed by the Ming musicologist Zhu Zaiyu, late 16th century).
- 5. Third Hymn for Welcoming the Spirits, arranged in the Tibetan lamaist style (as practised to the present day)

Afterwards, the offstage trombone chants: "May it please you to proceed to the place of ablution!"

- 6. Hymn for the Ablution, used as tenor cantus firmus in Agnus I (slightly adjusted) from Machaut’s Messe de Nostre Dame (mid-14th century)—With a little stretch of the imagination, it is not inconceivable that Christian missionaries could have shown off the latest ars nova music upon reaching the fabled Land of the Cathayans (Terra Kytaorum).

Afterwards, the offstage trombone chants: "Mount the steps [to the temple]!"

- 7. Hymn for the Ascent into the Hall, arranged in the Chinese Ming style (ornamentation as recommended by Wang Sizong, 1566; organum chords based on Huang Zuo, 1544)

Afterwards, the offstage trombone chants: "Proceed to the front of the Spirit Tablet of The Greatly Accomplished and Most Holy Prince of Promulgated Civilisation [i.e. Confucius]!"

- 8. Hymn for the Libations and Gifts, superimposed on the notorious rondeau, "Fumeaux fume" by Solage (late 14th century). Monkish humour might have insisted that this smoky piece accompany the one part of the ceremony for which the burning of incense was prescribed.

Afterwards, the offstage trombone chants: "Let the Official for the Ceremonial Victuals advance with the Ritual Tray!"

- 9. Hymn for the Elevation of the Ritual Tray, arranged in the Japanese gagaku style (based on the Chinese Tang style, as practised in Japan to the present day)—Of course, the Mongols failed to conquer Japan, so one must imagine captured Japanese musicians playing this music, a vicarious triumph for Mongol amour-propre.

Afterwards, the offstage trombone chants: "Proceed to the front of the Spirit Tablet of The Greatly Accomplished and Most Holy Prince of Promulgated Civilisation [i.e. Confucius]!"

- 10. Hymn for the First Presentation (Quodlibet Mongolicum). A guide for the listener through the overlapping of the hymns: each hymn is announced by three strokes on the temple block, and completed by three strokes on the wood block and three scrapes on the guiro.
  - Hymn to Confucius, arranged in the Chinese Qing style (18th century)—the tuning is based on the reconstructed official Qing scale, which had 14 chromatic steps instead of 12 to the octave
  - Hymn to Yan Hui, arranged in the Korean style (as above)
  - Hymn to Zengzi, arranged in the Tibetan style (as above)
  - Hymn to Zisi, arranged in the Japanese style (as above)—In the tradition of the Chinese historians, Ching appends his moral verdict to the bare facts: the vainglorious Mongol invasions of Japan, frustrated, like the Spanish Armada, by bad weather (kamikaze), are satirised by cheap wind and thunder effects.
  - Hymn to Mencius, used as tenor cantus firmus in Agnus II (slightly adjusted) from Machaut’s Messe de Nostre Dame (mid-14th century)
- 11. Ritual Address to the Spirits—chanted centre-stage by the bass trombone into his instrument, using reconstructed Yuan Mandarin, and substituting for the name of the emperor’s ritual deputy my own Chinese name

Afterwards, the offstage trombone chants: "Let the Second Presentation Official perform the rites!"

- 12. Hymn for the Second Presentation, arranged in the Tibetan style (as above)—punctuated by distant screams

Afterwards, the offstage trombone chants: "Let those in charge of the ceremonial victuals clear away the food vessels!"

- 13. Hymn for the Clearing Away of the Food Vessels, arranged in Chinese Republican style (20th century, as practised to the present day in the Temple of Confucius, Taipei)—punctuated by distant screams

Afterwards, the offstage trombone chants: "Let the various assistants withdraw to their original places!"

- 14. Hymn for the Ushering Out of the Spirits, performed in the Korean style (as above)—This is overlaid with a second series of calligraphic glissandi: the signature of Zhu Yuanzhang, Fiat (II), found on extant military papers for the anti-Mongol campaign. The fatal clock starts ticking again.
- 15. Fiat (III)—the final series of glissandi, based on another of Zhu’s signatures. The steady ticking gives way to the running out of the sands of time (Ming clocks were sand-powered)—now for the last Mongol emperor of China. Finally, Zhu drives him and his entire court out of China, becoming the first Ming emperor in 1368.

== Overall form ==
The whole work is described as "rondo-variations". The "rondo" element comes from the recurring variations in different historical Chinese styles. The "variations" are not on any one theme (although the original hymns are so similar as to seem to be mere variants of each other), but are, rather, stylistic parodies in the tradition of Beethoven’s Diabelli Variations.

== Historical source material ==
Nearly all the musical material of Terra Kytaorum—hymn melodies, keys, instrumentation, the varied national styles, non-standard tuning, and percussion patterns—may be verified in encyclopaedia articles, specialist journals and monographs, doctoral dissertations, Chinese treatises and records from the Yuan, Ming, and Qing dynasties, Western travellers’ reports, and transcriptions by others or Ching himself from ethnographic recordings. The two samples of Ming imperial signature were scanned at Ching's request by Mr Peter Lam, Director of the Art Museum, Chinese University of Hong Kong.
