= Kunstkabinett =

Kunstkabinett, a German term for a cabinet of curiosities (literally "culture room"), is a chamber work by the contemporary classical composer Jeffrey Ching. It was composed in Berlin on 05-28 June 2007, immediately after the completion of the first draft of the opera The Orphan, with which it shares both compositional approach and musical material (see below). Like its much larger sibling, Ching's Symphony No. 5, "Kunstkammer" (2006), it is an assemblage of musical objets d'art not obviously related in any way except by the personal taste of their collector.

== World premiere and instrumentation ==
Kunstkabinett was premiered by the Modern Art Ensemble and the composer's wife, the soprano Andión Fernández, in Berlin on 16 September 2007. It is scored for seven players (flute/contrabass flute, clarinet/contrabass clarinet, percussionist, piano, violin, viola, 'cello) and soprano.

== Sections of the work ==
The work is in three continuous movements of about fifteen minutes' duration:

=== I. Minutiae in D ===
The title is a pun on Mozart's Minuet in D (KV 576b), which is dissected and scrutinised in "minute" ways. The original piano piece is in two repeated halves. The first half is played straight through on the piano, alone onstage, before its "deconstruction" by the string trio, which throughout is tuned 1/4-tone higher than the piano and situated somewhere offstage. In the second half piano and strings switch roles. As a discipline, Ching tried to restrict his compositional interventions to the tonal and rhythmic limits of Mozart's already highly chromatic and dissonant language, so that the distinction between "text" and "commentary" is eventually blurred. The movement ends when the minuet is interrupted by the ostinato march rhythm on E^{b}-A in the piano's lowest octaves, which accompanies the procession onstage of the string trio, percussionist, and the two woodwinds, and continues throughout the following movement.

=== II. March of the Ambassadors ===
This an arrangement of the symphonic entr'acte preceding the final scene of The Orphan. In its original orchestral guise, the music divides into three rhythmically disparate ensembles each representing a foreign embassy to the ancient Chinese dukedom of Jin, but synchronised by a fourth ensemble which alternates the pitches E^{b}-A on each or every other downbeat till the end of the march. A word about the method of reduction from orchestra to sextet should reveal at a glance the contrapuntal plan of the movement:

- First Ensemble (representing the "Chaoxian" or Korean embassy)—reduced to large temple block, guiro, whip, "fou" (a large earthenware pot played with a switch), taiko drum (or medium bass drum), and piano (r.h. upper line)
- Second Ensemble (representing the "Wonu" or Japanese embassy)—reduced to flute, clarinet, small tam-tam, piano (r.h. lower line, l.h. upper line), violin, and viola
- Third Ensemble (representing the "Tufan" or Tibetan Imperial embassy)—reduced to pedal bass drum, sizzle cymbal, hi-hat cymbals, and violoncello
- Fourth Ensemble (furnishing a steady processional rhythm)—piano (l.h. lower line—which effectively takes the place of a conductor)

=== III. Molihua ===
The brief, final movement is an arrangement of the Chinese folksong of the same title (茉莉花, meaning "Jasmine Flower"), best-known outside China through its quotation in Puccini's Turandot, but here sung unadorned by the soprano onto the piano's undamped strings, and accompanied heterophonically by the violin alone, doubling the melody with various distorting effects (e.g. scratch tone, glissandi, scordatura). The Chinese text may be translated:

Here is a beautiful jasmine flower;
Here is a beautiful jasmine flower.
Perfumed blossoms fill the branch,
Fragrant and white for everyone's delight.
Let me come and pick a blossom
To give to someone,
Jasmine flower, oh jasmine flower.

Or, in the composer's paraphrase: Destruction and decay are embedded in every fragile and beautiful thing.
