= Qinyang =

Qinyang 沁阳市 Tsinyang
- County-level city
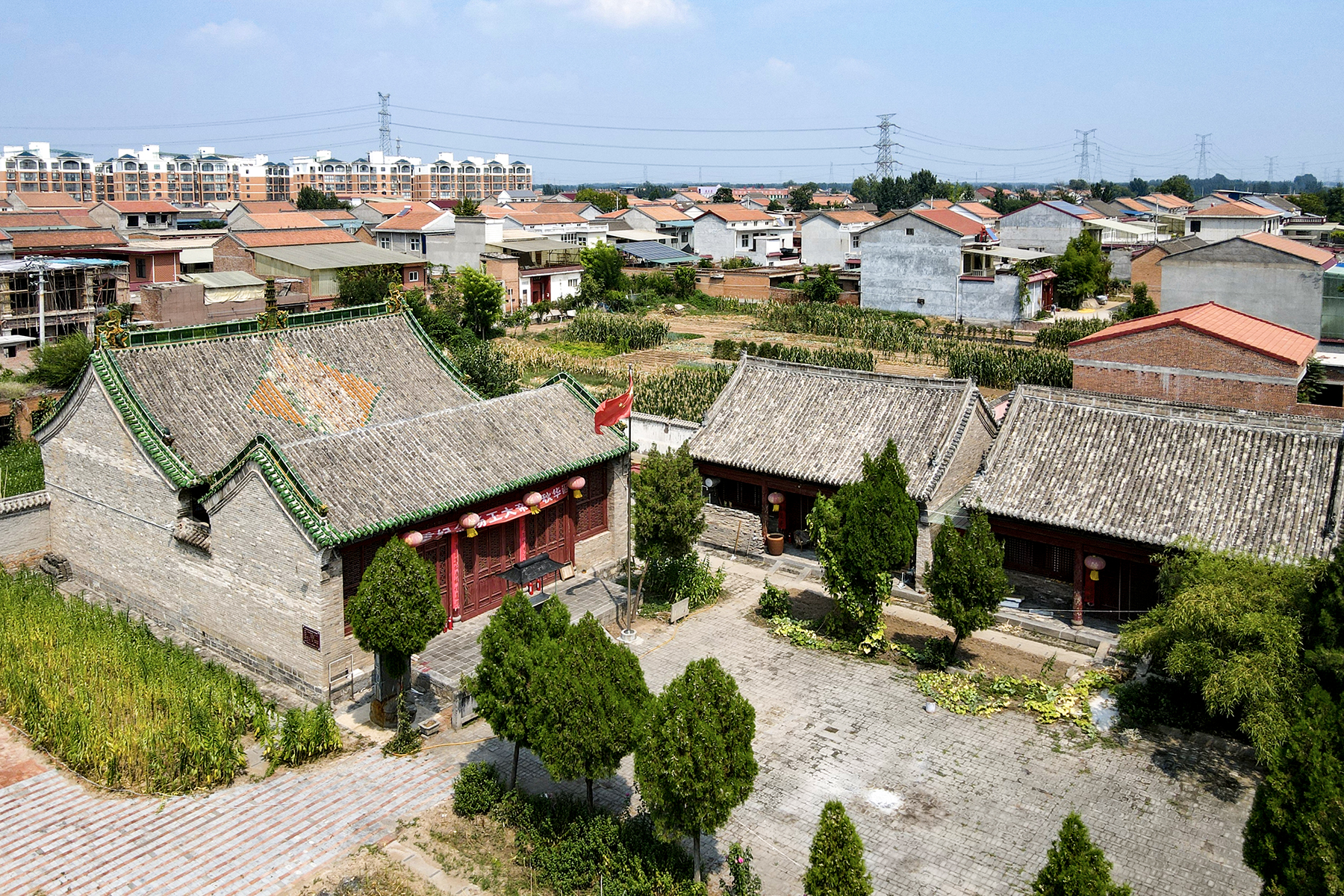

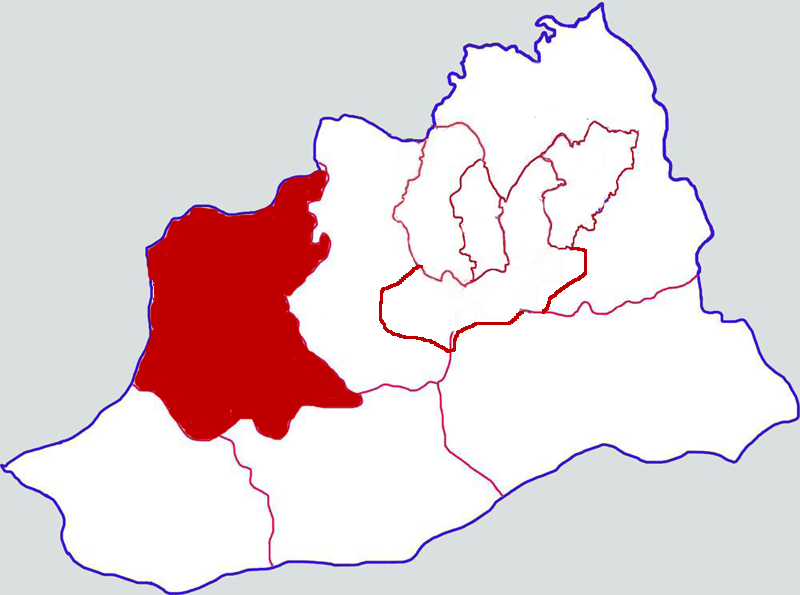
- Qinyang in Jiaozuo

- Location in Henan
- Coordinates: 35°05′17″N 112°57′04″E
- Country: People's Republic of China
- Province: Henan
- Prefecture-level city: Jiaozuo

Area
  - Total: 623 km^{2} (241 sq mi)

Population (2019)
  - Total: 445,200
  - Density: 715/km^{2} (1,850/sq mi)
- Postal code: 454550 or 454500
- Website: www.qinyang.gov.cn

Qinyang (simplified Chinese: 沁阳; traditional Chinese: 沁陽; pinyin: Qìnyáng) is a county-level city in Henan province, China, bordering Shanxi province to the north. It is administered by the prefecture-level city Jiaozuo. The current population of Qinyang is estimated at 470,000. In 1999, the population stood at 444,480.

== History ==
Qinyang was known as Yewang (野王) during the Qin dynasty, changed to Henei county (河內县) during the Sui, and served as the capital seat of Huaizhou during the Tang, Hwai-king (Hwaiking) Foo (懷慶府; Huáiqìng fǔ) under the Qing, and received the current name in 1913.

== Geography ==
=== Location ===
Located between 112'46'~113°02' east longitude and 34°59'~35°18' north latitude, Qinyang which lies in the northwest of Henan Province occupies a total area of 623.5 square kilometers. It was beside the Yellow River in the late 19th century, but the river's floods have since moved it further south. Qinyang is now located along the Zhan (湛河, Zhànhé), a tributary of the Yellow River. A part of the Taihang Mountains called the Shennong Mountain is in the rural area of Qinyang City. The southeast of Qinyang City is 128 kilometers away from Zhengzhou, the provincial capital, 90 kilometers away from Luoyang in the east and 36 kilometers away from Jiaozuo in the east.

=== Terrain ===
here are many plains in the territory, accounting for 66% of the total area, and the rest are mountainous and hilly areas. The north is Taihang Mountain, the south is overlooking the Yellow River, and the mountains and plains coexist. The terrain is generally high in the northwest and low in the southeast. From north to south, there are three types of mountains, hills and plains. The famous mountain peaks include Zijin Mountain (commonly known as Xiaobeiding), Yuntai Mountain, Yunyang Mountain and Yangshan, all of which belong to the tail of the Taihang Mountains. Among them, Zijin Mountain and Yuntai Mountain are above 1,100 meters above sea level.

=== Climate ===
Qinyang City is a warm temperate continental climate with four distinct seasons, dry and windy springs, hot and rainy summers, warm and cool nights in autumn, and cold and dry in winter. The annual average temperature is 14.3 °C (57.7 °F). The highest temperature is 42.1 °C (107.8 °F), the lowest temperature is −18.6 °C (−1.5 °F). The seasonal temperature changes obviously. The average temperature in spring is 14.7 °C (58.5 °F), the average temperature in summer is 26.4 °C (79.5 °F), the average temperature in autumn is 14.6 °C (58.3 °F), and the average temperature in winter is 1.3 °C (34.3 °F). The annual average precipitation is 576.5 mm (22.70 in), of which the winter precipitation is the least, the average precipitation is 28.1 mm (1.11 in), accounting for 4.9% of the whole year; the spring precipitation is slightly more, the average precipitation is 100.0 mm (3.94 in), accounting for 17.3% of the whole year, and the precipitation in autumn is more, averaging 147.3 mm (5.80 in), accounting for 25.6% of the whole year; the summer precipitation is the most, the average precipitation is 301.1 mm (11.85 in), accounting for 52.2% of the whole year; the annual maximum precipitation is 1,101.1 mm (43.35 in), the minimum precipitation is 262.9 mm (10.35 in), and the precipitation is concentrated in seven, eight and nine. Three months, the intensity of precipitation is large, often causing floods. The average annual frost-free period is 210 days.

Climate data for Qinyang, elevation 118 m (387 ft), (1991–2020 normals, extremes 1981–2010)
| Month | Jan | Feb | Mar | Apr | May | Jun | Jul | Aug | Sep | Oct | Nov | Dec | Year |
|---|---|---|---|---|---|---|---|---|---|---|---|---|---|
| Record high °C (°F) | 19.3 (66.7) | 24.0 (75.2) | 29.5 (85.1) | 37.7 (99.9) | 41.2 (106.2) | 43.4 (110.1) | 41.2 (106.2) | 39.6 (103.3) | 38.6 (101.5) | 35.7 (96.3) | 27.8 (82.0) | 23.5 (74.3) | 43.4 (110.1) |
| Mean daily maximum °C (°F) | 6.1 (43.0) | 10.2 (50.4) | 15.6 (60.1) | 22.8 (73.0) | 28.1 (82.6) | 33.0 (91.4) | 32.6 (90.7) | 31.0 (87.8) | 27.3 (81.1) | 22.1 (71.8) | 14.6 (58.3) | 8.1 (46.6) | 21.0 (69.7) |
| Daily mean °C (°F) | 0.8 (33.4) | 4.6 (40.3) | 9.7 (49.5) | 16.6 (61.9) | 22.1 (71.8) | 26.9 (80.4) | 27.8 (82.0) | 26.4 (79.5) | 21.9 (71.4) | 16.2 (61.2) | 8.8 (47.8) | 2.8 (37.0) | 15.4 (59.7) |
| Mean daily minimum °C (°F) | −3.1 (26.4) | 0.2 (32.4) | 4.9 (40.8) | 11.2 (52.2) | 16.7 (62.1) | 21.6 (70.9) | 24.0 (75.2) | 22.8 (73.0) | 17.8 (64.0) | 11.7 (53.1) | 4.4 (39.9) | −1.1 (30.0) | 10.9 (51.7) |
| Record low °C (°F) | −16.4 (2.5) | −15.0 (5.0) | −6.4 (20.5) | −0.5 (31.1) | 5.1 (41.2) | 13.0 (55.4) | 17.1 (62.8) | 13.7 (56.7) | 7.1 (44.8) | −1.7 (28.9) | −7.9 (17.8) | −9.7 (14.5) | −16.4 (2.5) |
| Average precipitation mm (inches) | 10.0 (0.39) | 11.9 (0.47) | 18.7 (0.74) | 29.6 (1.17) | 46.7 (1.84) | 68.8 (2.71) | 119.9 (4.72) | 96.9 (3.81) | 69.2 (2.72) | 37.0 (1.46) | 26.3 (1.04) | 6.2 (0.24) | 541.2 (21.31) |
| Average precipitation days (≥ 0.1 mm) | 3.7 | 4.1 | 4.5 | 5.8 | 7.2 | 7.5 | 10.3 | 9.5 | 8.4 | 6.6 | 5.1 | 2.7 | 75.4 |
| Average snowy days | 3.9 | 3.3 | 1.0 | 0 | 0 | 0 | 0 | 0 | 0 | 0 | 1.0 | 2.5 | 11.7 |
| Average relative humidity (%) | 58 | 56 | 56 | 58 | 59 | 58 | 73 | 76 | 72 | 66 | 64 | 58 | 63 |
| Mean monthly sunshine hours | 120.8 | 134.1 | 173.8 | 204.4 | 220.8 | 202.7 | 180.5 | 178.7 | 156.1 | 156.7 | 142.4 | 135.6 | 2,006.6 |
| Percentage possible sunshine | 39 | 43 | 47 | 52 | 51 | 47 | 41 | 43 | 42 | 45 | 46 | 45 | 45 |
Source: China Meteorological Administration

== Administrative divisions ==
As of 2012, this county is divided to 4 subdistricts, 6 towns and 3 townships.

Subdistricts

- Qinyuan Subdistrict (沁园街道)
- Taihang Subdistrict (太行街道)
- Tanhuai Subdistrict (覃怀街道)
- Huaiqing Subdistrict (怀庆街道)

Towns

- Baixiang (柏香镇)
- Chongyi (崇义镇)
- Shanwangzhuang (山王庄镇)
- Xifang (西万镇)
- Xixiang (西向镇)
- Ziling (紫陵镇)

Townships

- Changping Township (常平乡)
- Wangqu Township (王曲乡)
- Wangzhao Township (王召乡)

== Notable individuals ==
Li Shangyin, one of the most outstanding poets of the late Tang dynasty, is from Huaizhou Hanoi (now Henan Qinyang).

Zhu Zaiyu, a famous musician, born in the Ming dynasty Wang Gong (now Henan Qinyang), is Ming Taizu Zhu Yuanzhang's eighth generation.
