= Symphony No. 3, "Rituals" =

Musical work composed by Jeffrey Ching

Rituals is the title of Jeffrey Ching's Third Symphony, a Philippine government commission for the centennial of the Philippine Declaration of Independence from Spain on 12 June 1898. It is in one continuous movement lasting about forty-four minutes. After weeks of planning and research, Ching began sketching it in London on 28 October 1997, completing the full score there on 19 May 1998. The world premiere was given in Manila on 14 June 1998 by the Philippine Philharmonic Orchestra under Josefino Toledo.

== Plan and instrumentation of the work ==
The orchestra is divided into three ensembles which enter one after—and on top of—another with totally distinct music in different meters, keys, rhythms, and bar-lines, coordinated by a single conductor beating a common pulse for all three. Each is essentially a transcription for modern instruments of the ancient high-art music of the Malays, the Chinese, and the Spaniards. The symphony is therefore a celebration, in the Philippines’ centennial year, of her incomparably diverse cultural legacies from different civilisations.

=== The Malay layer ===
The Malay layer plays for the entire length of the symphony, condensing into three-quarters of an hour the complete eight tabuhs of the Balinese gamelan gong tradition. This is a direct link with the grand, courtly style of medieval Java, irrecoverable today but for the field researches of Colin McPhee in Bali from 1931 to 1939. The successive tabuhs increase in duration, the growing phrase-lengths set off by ever more widely spaced gong-strokes, so that an uncut recital of all eight would last several hours. The basic compositional features are: a prelude with solos, simultaneous theme and variations (like an extended passacaglia), colotomic punctuation, Alberti-bass-type figuration, and differentiation of structure by tempo changes and varying intensity of the drumming. These are the classical Balinese principles, but applied here to a pentatonic scale of southern Philippine folk origin—D – E^{b} – G – A^{#} – B—with the first two notes played as C^{#} – D and D^{#} – E, respectively, to mimic the untempered "out-of-tune" pitches of the original instruments. The scoring for this Malay ensemble, situated directly in front of and around the conductor, is for cymbals, tamtams, bass vibraphone, glockenspiel, xylomarimba, xylophone, bongos, celeste, and piano.

=== The Chinese layer ===
Ranged behind the Malay ensemble is the Chinese ensemble of violins and double basses on high harmonics, plucked ‘cellos, piccolos, oboes, clarinets and piccolo clarinet, muted trumpet, harp, and various percussion. After a crescendo bass drum summons, these play a sequence of six slow hymns, such as would have accompanied the bi-annual sacrifices performed at the Temple of Confucius by the emperors of China since 195 B.C. Ching's version is drawn from the "Thirty-one Ceremonial Airs" by the Song dynasty composer Xiong Penglai (ca. 1246 – ca. 1323), who used a wider gamut (a heptatonic scale) and more interesting intervals than were to be allowed in the later Ming and Qing hymns. In the order of the hymns, the dialogue of the percussion instruments and their spatial disposition on stage, Ching abided closely by the extant Ming and Qing manuals and some corroborative Western eyewitness accounts. The "wrong" notes in the doubling of the hymn tunes also accord strictly with the yin-yang cosmology of Chinese acoustics. For the heterophonic accompaniment, Ching found a living exemplar in the unbroken tradition of Ming music which he heard in the Zhihua Temple in Beijing in June 1997. A chorus would have sung the hymns, but is omitted here. Instead, a male chanter announces in Mandarin Chinese the part of the liturgy accompanied or followed by each hymn (e.g., the washing of hands, or pouring of the libation).

=== The Spanish layer ===
In the middle of the second hymn, which is also the close of Tabuh IV, the music of the Spanish ensemble (flutes, recorders, English horn, bassoons, violas, ‘cellos, harps, guitars, organ, and nineteen off- and onstage brass, ideally arrayed farthest away from the conductor) is introduced by an ominous martial rhythm on the tenor drum, leading to the Dies Irae plainchant intoned by offstage horns. This Gregorian incipit provides both cantus firmus and a host of contrapuntal motifs for the Renaissance-style motet that ensues, patterned on the elaborate polyphonic and antiphonal manner of the three masters of the Spanish Golden Age, Morales, Guerrero, and Victoria. An integral fifteen-minute composition in its own right (although only heard superimposed on the Malay and Chinese ensembles), the motet consists of:

- Incipit "Dies Irae"
- Motetus, a 9
- Contrapunctus I, a 5
- Canon I, a 8
- Contrapunctus II, a 4
- Canon II, a 10—this is Canon I per arsin et thesin (upside down)
- Contrapunctus III, a 5
- Canon III, a 8—this is Canon I in motu cancrizans (backwards)
- Contrapunctus IV, a 5
- Motetus, a 9—reprise of the first motetus, but with ornamentation in strings and woodwinds

=== Close of the work ===
The Spanish layer, entering last, also terminates earliest. The Chinese layer, entering second, yet outlives the Spanish. Finally only the Malay layer is left sounding alone, as at the beginning. But five minutes before the end of the last tabuh, the instruments from the Chinese and Spanish ensembles re-enter by gradual degrees to be reintegrated as a symphony orchestra. Ching then inserts a dissonant, polytonal version of the opening of Wagner's Das Rheingold, the intervals inverted into the opening of The Star-spangled Banner. Explaining the work's unexpected conclusion, the composer writes:

While Tabuh VIII carries on to its own close, it is engulfed by portents of post-1898 events—in particular, the sinking of the USS Maine—in the unmistakable guise of the Wagnerian Rhinegold of free-market capitalism and election-year demagoguery. The bar-lines, once disparate, now line up, as if by way of metaphor for the cultural levelling of the global village. This is at once apotheosis and lampoon, as the quotation and metamorphoses of the world’s best-known national anthem make clear.
I think the message intended in my Third Symphony is not too obscure: The best, the richest, the most glorious part of a country’s heritage is also her past—in the case of a country like the Philippines, first and foremost her Asian past, shared to a large extent with her East and Southeast Asian neighbours, but also, since the Spanish Conquest, the high civilisation of Renaissance and post-Renaissance Europe, which touched off many a sympathetic vibration in her native spirit. 1898 may have brought about the end of Spanish rule, but it was also the logical culmination of over three hundred years of it. What followed, on the other hand, was a fundamental psychical disruption. The sense of the hierarchical, the numinous, the ceremonious, and the patrician—common to Asia and Europe alike—has no place in the Republic of Mob Rule and Pursuit of Profit.
Yet we let it vanish at our peril.
Human rites, as much as rights, are worth dying for.

== Critical reception ==
Rituals was a turning-point in Ching's compositional evolution, and marked the first time that his diverse cultural background and historical training were allied to his mastery of counterpoint and of large-scale forms. Something of this achievement was recognised by local critics:

Strangely, while the music took us to era after era, we had a feeling that time was standing still. With its layering upon layering, its piling upon piling on [sic] of density upon density of sound, it amounted to an architectonic marvel, a milestone... In brief...it is highly intellectual, singularly refined, yet to the point—very erudite, very Ching: the work of a creative genius.
