= Equal temperament =

Musical tuning system

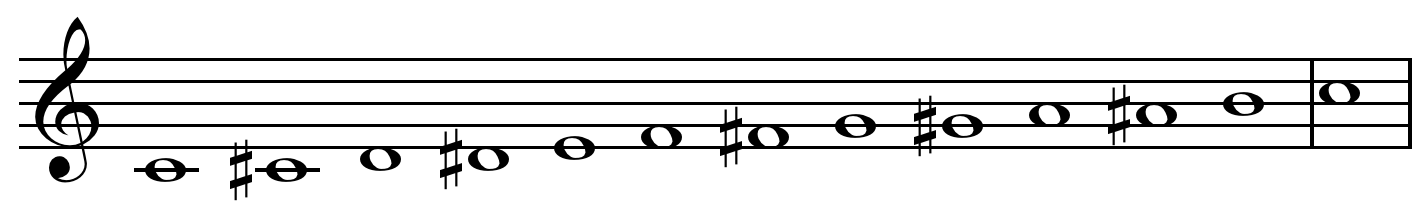
Chromatic scale on C in equal temperament. Ascending and descending

Equal temperament is a musical tuning system in which all intervals are approximated by multiples of a single interval. The most common equal temperament represents the octave as 12 exactly equal semitones. (Note: The system is sometimes called twelve-tone equal temperament (12-TET), 12-tone equal division of the octave (12-TEDO), 12 equal division of 2/1 (12-ED2), 12 equal division of the octave (12-EDO); informally abbreviated to twelve equal or referred to as equal temperament without qualification in Western countries.)

The 12-note chromatic scale employs a semitone ratio equal to the 12th root of 2 ($\sqrt[12]{2}$ ≈ 1.05946). Equalizing the semitones in this way causes other intervals to deviate slightly from their "pure" sounds; the fourths and fifths produced by this method are closer to their just intonation than the thirds and sixths are.

Equal temperament has been the predominant tuning system of Western music since the 20th century. It is also used in other cultures.

== History ==
The two figures frequently credited with determining how to calculate equal temperament are Chinese mathematician and theorist Zhu Zaiyu (also romanized as Chu-Tsaiyu, Chinese: 朱載堉) and Flemish scholar Simon Stevin.

Zhu is sometimes credited with the discovery of equal temperament. In 1584, he wrote: "I have founded a new system. I establish one foot as the number from which the others are to be extracted, and using proportions I extract them. Altogether one has to find the exact figures for the pitch-pipers in twelve operations."

Simon Stevin's independent solution came the following year and was slightly less precise. Both men approached the problem primarily as a computing procedure rather than as a practical musical solution.

=== China ===
==== Early history ====
In 433 BCE, a massive set of bronze chime bells were manufactured that could play five octaves of a C major scale. The middle range of the set included bells for all twelve semitones. The instruments were discovered intact in the tomb of Marquis Yi of Zeng.

The earliest numerical approximation for equal temperament was described by He Chengtian, a mathematician of the Southern and Northern Dynasties who lived from 370 to 447.

==== Zhu Zaiyu ====
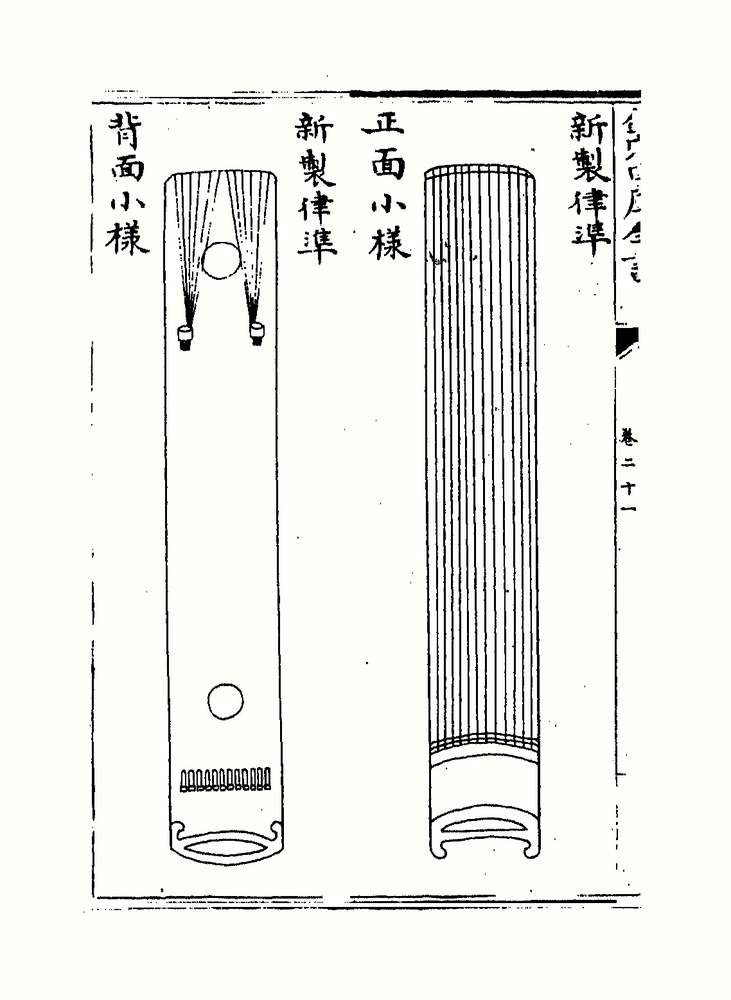
Prince Zhu Zaiyu constructed 12 string equal temperament tuning instrument, front and back view

Zhu Zaiyu (朱載堉), a prince of the Ming court, spent thirty years on research based on the equal temperament idea originally postulated by his father. He described his new pitch theory in his Fusion of Music and Calendar 律暦融通 published in 1581. This was followed by the publication of a precise numerical specification for equal temperament in his 5,000-page work Complete Compendium of Music and Pitch (Yuelü quan shu 樂律全書) in 1584. An extended account is also given by Joseph Needham. Zhu obtained his result mathematically by dividing the length of string and pipe successively by ^{12}√2 ≈ 1.059463, and for pipe length by ^{24}√2, such that after twelve divisions (an octave) the length was divided by a factor of 2:

$$\left( \sqrt[12]{2} \right)^{12} = 2$$

Similarly, after 84 divisions (7 octaves) the length was divided by a factor of 128:

$$\left( \sqrt[12]{2} \right)^{84} = 2^7 = 128$$

Zhu Zaiyu has been credited as the first person to solve the equal temperament problem mathematically. His work may have been transmitted to Europe by Jesuit missionary Matteo Ricci. There is no evidence to confirm such transmission. James Murray Barbour wrote, "The first known appearance in print of the correct figures for equal temperament was in China, where Prince Tsaiyü's brilliant solution remains an enigma." The 19th-century German physicist Hermann von Helmholtz wrote in On the Sensations of Tone that a Chinese prince (see below) introduced a scale of seven notes, and that the division of the octave into twelve semitones was discovered in China.

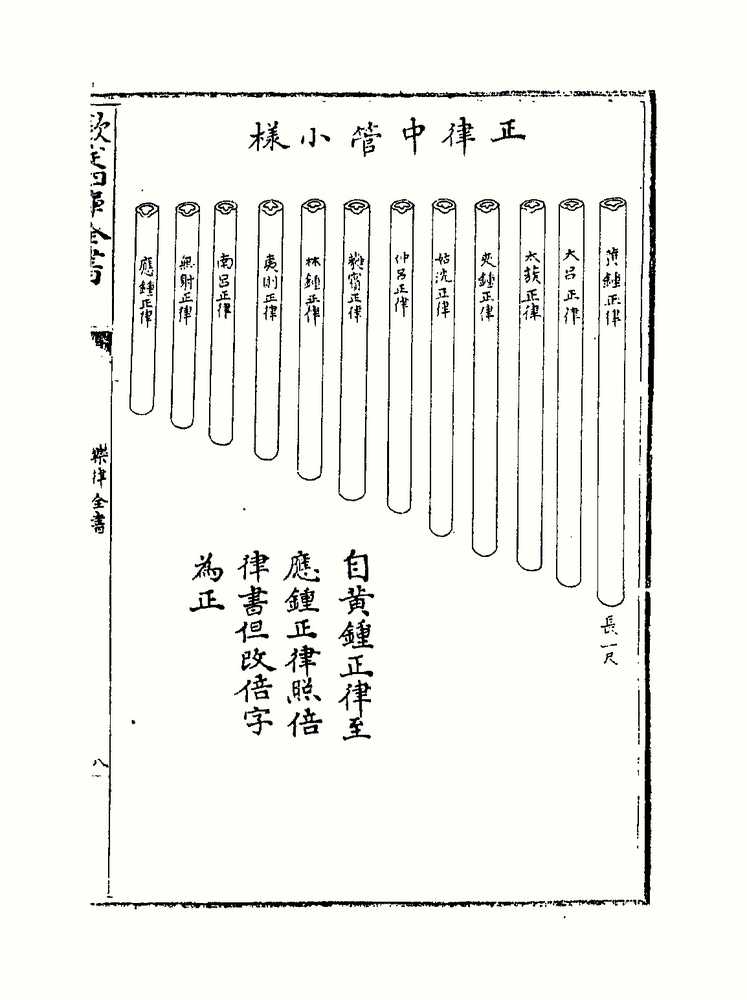
Zhu Zaiyu's equal temperament pitch pipes

Zhu Zaiyu illustrated his equal temperament theory by the construction of a set of 36 bamboo tuning pipes ranging in 3 octaves, with instructions of the type of bamboo, color of paint, and detailed specification on their length and inner and outer diameters. He also constructed a 12-string tuning instrument, with a set of tuning pitch pipes hidden inside its bottom cavity. In 1890, Victor-Charles Mahillon, curator of the Conservatoire museum in Brussels, duplicated a set of pitch pipes according to Zhu Zaiyu's specification. He said that the Chinese theory of tones knew more about the length of pitch pipes than its Western counterpart, and that the set of pipes duplicated according to the Zaiyu data proved the accuracy of this theory.

=== Europe ===
==== Early history ====
Writing in 4th century BC Greece, Aristoxenus criticized the irrational numbers that arose in the Pythagorean system and proposed to simply divide the octave into equal parts. During the Renaissance, Aristoxenus was often cited as the originator of equal temperament.

Francesco Spinacino's Recercare de tutti li Toni (Ricercar of all the Tones, 1507) is emblematic of a genre of preludes that establish a work's tonality by modulating through all of them until the correct key is reached.

In 1567, lutenist Giacomo Gorzanis published a set of pieces for every major and minor mode. Such projects were more feasible in equal temperament. Vincenzo Galilei followed this pattern in his 1584 Fronimo Dialogo. Galilei used the 18:17 ratio for fretting the lute (although some adjustment was necessary for pure octaves).

In the 17th century lutenist-composer John Wilson wrote a set of 30 preludes including 24 in all the major/minor keys. Henricus Grammateus drew a close approximation to equal temperament in 1518. The first tuning rules in equal temperament were given by Giovanni Maria Lanfranco in his "Scintille de musica". In his polemic with Galilei, Zarlino initially opposed equal temperament but acceded to it in relation to the lute in his Sopplimenti musicali in 1588.

==== Simon Stevin ====
Stevin's Calculations
Modern name	Length	Ratio	Actual Length
Unison	10000	1	10000
Semitone	9438	$\sqrt[12]{\frac{1}{2}}$	9439
Tone	8908	$\sqrt[6]{\frac{1}{2}}$	8909
Minor third	8404	$\sqrt[4]{\frac{1}{2}}$	8409
Major third	7936	$\sqrt[3]{\frac{1}{2}}$	7937
Fourth	7491	$\sqrt[12]{\frac{1}{32}}$	7492
Augmented fourth	7071	$\sqrt[]{\frac{1}{2}}$	7071
Fifth	6674	$\sqrt[12]{\frac{1}{128}}$	6674
Minor sixth	6298	$\sqrt[3]{\frac{1}{4}}$	6300
Major sixth	5944	$\sqrt[4]{\frac{1}{8}}$	5946
Seventh	5611	$\sqrt[6]{\frac{1}{32}}$	5612
Augmented seventh	5296	$\sqrt[12]{\frac{1}{2048}}$	5297
Octave	5000	$\frac{1}{2}$	5000

The first mention of equal temperament related to the twelfth root of two in the West appeared in Simon Stevin's manuscript Vande Spiegheling der singconst (On the Theory of the Art of Singing, c. 1605), published posthumously nearly three centuries later in 1884. Like most mathematicians involved in the quantitative musical theory problem of equal division of the octave, Stevin was not focused on tuning and was largely insensitive to it. He felt his solution uncovered the true ratios for consonances.

Stevin's chord lengths are slightly incorrect due to inaccurate calculation. Instead of a unified ratio, Simon Stevin's chords have one ratio per tone. He made a second set of calculations using fewer ratios and got similar results.

A generation later, French mathematician Marin Mersenne presented several equal tempered chord lengths obtained by Jean Beaugrand, Ismael Bouillaud, and Jean Galle.

In 1630 Johann Faulhaber published a 100-cent monochord table, which contained several errors due to his use of logarithmic tables. He did not explain how he obtained his results.

==== Baroque era ====
From 1550 to about 1650, lutes and viols were equal temperament instruments. Equally spaced frets are also depicted in 15th-century paintings. The Brossard lute manuscript compiled in the last quarter of the 17th century contains a series of 18 preludes attributed to Mlle Bocquet written in all keys, including the last prelude, Prélude sur tous les tons, which enharmonically modulates through all keys. Angelo Michele Bartolotti published a series of passacaglias in all keys, with modulating passages connecting enharmonically. The 17th-century keyboard composer Girolamo Frescobaldi advocated equal temperament. Some theorists, such as Giuseppe Tartini, opposed equal temperament; they felt that degrading the purity of each chord diminished the music's aesthetic appeal, although Andreas Werckmeister emphatically advocated equal temperament in his 1707 treatise published posthumously.

Equal temperament took hold for a variety of reasons. It was a convenient fit for the existing keyboard design, and permitted total harmonic freedom with the burden of moderate impurity in every interval, particularly imperfect consonances. This allowed greater expression through enharmonic modulation, which became extremely important in the 18th century in music of such composers as Francesco Geminiani, Wilhelm Friedemann Bach, Carl Philipp Emmanuel Bach, and Johann Gottfried Müthel. Equal temperament did have some disadvantages, such as imperfect thirds, but as Europe switched to equal temperament, it changed the music that it wrote in order to accommodate the system and minimize dissonance.

A precise equal temperament is possible using the 17th century Sabbatini method of splitting the octave first into three tempered major thirds. This was also proposed by several writers during the Classical era. Tuning without beat rates but employing several checks, achieving virtually modern accuracy, was already done in the first decades of the 19th century. Using beat rates, first proposed in 1749, became common after their diffusion by Helmholtz and Ellis in the second half of the 19th century. In the 20th century, one piano tuning manual included a table of beats per second for important intervals. The intervals of equal temperament closely approximate some intervals in just intonation.

== Varieties of equal temperament ==
Other equal temperaments divide the octave differently. The Arab tone system uses 24-tone equal temperament. Music has also been written in 19 equal temperament and 31 equal temperament.

Instead of dividing an octave, an equal temperament can also divide a different interval. The equal-tempered version of the Bohlen–Pierce scale divides the just interval of an octave and a fifth into 13 equal parts.

== Similar tuning systems ==
At least a century before He Chengtian, Chinese musicians developed a series of 12 fundamental tones known as Shí-èr-lǜ. Developed by the ancient Greeks, Pythagorean tuning was the predominant system in Europe until the Renaissance. A series of unequal temperaments were developed that made more chromatic notes available in acceptable tunings.

== Comparison with just intonation ==
The intervals of 12-tone equal temperament closely approximate some intervals in just intonation (JI). The fifths and fourths are almost indistinguishably close to just intervals, while thirds and sixths are further away.

Interval Name	Interval (ET)	Cents (ET)	Interval (JI)	Cents (JI)	Tuning error
Unison	2^{0/12} = 1	0	1/1 = 1	0.00	0.00
Minor second	2^{1/12}	100	16/15	111.73	−11.73
Major second	2^{2/12}	200	9/8	203.91	−3.91
Minor third	2^{3/12}	300	6/5	315.64	−15.64
Major third	2^{4/12}	400	5/4	386.31	+13.69
Perfect fourth	2^{5/12}	500	4/3	498.04	+1.96
Tritone	2^{6/12}	600	45/32	590.22	+9.78
Perfect fifth	2^{7/12}	700	3/2	701.96	−1.96
Minor sixth	2^{8/12}	800	8/5	813.69	−13.69
Major sixth	2^{9/12}	900	5/3	884.36	+15.64
Minor seventh	2^{10/12}	1000	9/5	1017.60	−17.60
Major seventh	2^{11/12}	1100	15/8	1088.27	+11.73
Octave	2^{12/12} = 2	1200	2/1 = 2	1200.00	0.00

== See also ==
- Diatonic and chromatic
- Electronic tuner
- Just intonation
- List of meantone intervals
- Microtonal music
- Music and mathematics
- Musical acoustics (the physics of music)
- Musical tuning
