= Symphony No. 2, "The Imp of the Perverse" =

The Imp of the Perverse is the title of Jeffrey Ching's Second Symphony. It is in a single fantasy-like movement lasting about fifteen minutes. The title comes from a story by Edgar Allan Poe, from which these lines serve as epigraph to the score:

I am not more certain that I breathe, than that the assurance of the wrong or error of any action is often the one unconquerable force which impels us, and alone impels us to its prosecution… In the case of that something which I term perverseness, the desire to be well is not only not aroused, but a strongly antagonistical sentiment exists.

== Composition, world premiere, instrumentation ==
The Imp of the Perverse was composed in London between 30 October and 10 December 1992. Contrary to his usual methods, Ching worked straight into full score by sustaining the initial burst of inspiration for several weeks, almost in a trance-like state akin to automatic writing, and without recourse to sketches or outlines of any kind. Originally scored for chamber orchestra, the work was rewritten for substantially larger forces when the Jeunesses Musicales World Youth Orchestra under Woldemar Nelsson premiered it on 19 July 1995. In this form, prepared in London from 16 February to 17 March 1995, the instrumentation is for piccolo, 2 flutes/piccolo II, 2 oboes, English horn/oboe III, 2 clarinets/E^{b} clarinet, bass clarinet/clarinet III, 2 bassoons, double bassoon/bassoon III, 2 horns, 2 trumpets, 2 tenor trombones, bass trombone, timpani, 3 percussionists, and strings.

== Programmatic content ==
As with Rodin’s sculptures, the title was chosen after the piece was finished, and implies no literary or programmatic inspiration for the music. In his Symphony No. 1 in C, Ching explored to the limit many techniques of the Classical four-movement symphony. In his second symphony, he explored the possibilities of a consciously anti-Classical approach, fragmented, and avoiding fluid textures in favour of abrupt shifts between extreme moods. There are also aleatory passages (where fragments are freely played by individual players without measure or fixed beat), but unity is sought through the pre-Classical passacaglia technique (variations built around fixed melodic units). This leads to many false climaxes before the final one, a vast crescendo over a steady, pounding beat. The Poe story parallels the macabre elements in the symphony: A man commits the perfect murder, but after a long struggle with his soul finally gives himself up, not because of a guilty conscience, but because he cannot the resist the thrill of self-destruction, so falling prey to his ‘imp of the perverse’. To Ching, this insane demonstration of existential freedom—of a superhuman freedom not bound even by rational self-interest—was a distinctly modern psychological discovery by Poe, with many points of contact with the composer's transition from the comforts of Classical sonata form to the hazards of contemporary free form.
