= Notas para una cartografía de Filipinas =

Notas para una cartografía de Filipinas, subtitled Prelude, Toccata, and Fugues for piano and gangsa, one player, is a work by the contemporary classical composer Jeffrey Ching (Chinese name in Piny''in: Zhuang Zŭxin 莊祖欣, 庄祖欣). It was completed in Berlin on 19 December 2007. The first performances were given by Kyoko Okuni in Münster on 30 September 2008 and by Abelardo Galang II in Osaka on 5 October 2008.

== Origin of the title ==
The Spanish title, meaning "Notes for a cartography of the Philippines", was taken from this sentence in a scholarly journal:

Between 1903 and 1907 Blair and Robertson incorporated numerous photoengraved reproductions of early maps in their well-known corpus of Philippiniana (Emma Helen Blair and James Alexander Robertson, The Philippine Islands, 1493-1898, 55 vols. [Cleveland 1903-1907]), and Robertson at the same time evaluated some of these maps as historical evidence, but the first attempt at a cartographical analysis was made by Pardo de Tavera in 1910 ("Notas para una cartografía de Filipinas", Cultura Filipina, vol. I, no. 8 [Manila 1910], pp. 101-176).

The present composition is also an "attempt at a cartographical analysis" of the Philippines, in that each of the archipelago's three main island groups—Luzon, Visayas, and Mindanao—is distinctly represented. But the same learned article also discusses in considerable detail the cartographical contributions of the Philippines’ Asian neighbours:

...[A]llegedly the first map to depict any part of the Philippine Islands, was the "Earth vehicle" (Yü-t’u), that is, a terrestrial map, which Chu Ssû-pen completed in 1320. ... [T]he second map to depict the Philippines...exists only in the form of a copy made about a century after the original. I refer to the Hun-I chiang-li li-tai kuo-tu chih-t’u (Map of the territories of the one world and the capitals of the countries in successive ages) compiled in 1402 by Li Hui and Ch'üan Chin... The earliest map [in the Japanese map collection in the East Asiatic Library of the University of California]...dates from about 1620, and depicts a deformed Luzon under the rubric Ruson. ... The collection also contains a map (Nantan Bushū Bankoku Shōka no Zu) belonging to the East Asian tradition of Buddhist cartography, which is dated to 1710, although based on an exemplar of 1688. ...[I]ts plethora of rubrics include elements from virtually all the traditions of Chinese topographical writing...

== Description ==
The piece lasts between fifteen and twenty minutes, and opens with a prelude suffused with misty echoes of Sino-Japanese imperial court music, in the form of a Chinese melody of the Tang dynasty, "Music of Universal Peace". It is notated wholly without bar lines, so that its poetic "timelessness" is also literal. The traditional harmonies of the Japanese mouth-organ (shō) are quoted, and gagaku drums of different sizes evoked through various percussive effects (palm and fingernail taps and tremolos) on the wooden casing of the piano.

A highly rhythmic toccata follows, polyphonically adapting within its pentatonic confines a kudyapi (boat lute) piece from the province of Maguindanao in Mindanao (the southernmost Philippine island group). Then a rather Hispanic lullaby from the Visayas (the central island group) is expanded into a very European chromatic fughetta. The two geographical areas unite in a double fugue for the concluding allegro tempo primo, embracing the remaining region of Luzon (the northernmost island group) only upon the entry of the gangsa, the flat lap-gong of the Kalingga and Tinggian tribes. The fugue is interrupted six times towards its close, accelerating twice after two interruptions by the gangsa. After a seventh interruption (which gives the pianist the opportunity to position the gangsa over the piano's lowest strings), a majestic restatement of the Visayan lullaby theme gradually subsides, bringing the whole work to a quiet close.

== Critical notice ==
Jeffrey Ching hatte für seine Notas ein kalligrafisches Notenbild zu bieten, dessen ornamentale Feinheit sich im Klang wider-spiegelte. Die Pianistin Okuni musste am Flügel klopfen, sich während des Spielens einen Gong umbinden lassen und parallel strapaziöse Ostinato-Figuren, komplexe Akkordarpeggien und blitzartige Dynamikwechsel bewältigen. Sie durchwanderte die Grafik des Notenbildes wie eine Landkarte.

== Footnotes ==
=== References ===
- Ching, Jeffrey. "Composer's Note" to Notas para una cartografía de Filipinas (unpub. score used with the composer's kind permission).
- Moseler, Günter (2 October 2008). "Von einer Pianistin, die auf Holz klopft". Münstersche Zeitung.
- Wheatley, Paul (1966). "Review of Carlos Quirino's Philippine Cartography (1320-1899), second revised edition (Amsterdam, Israel 1963)". Oriens. 18/19: 467–470. doi:10.1163/18778372-01801901075. JSTOR 1579802.
