= Jeffrey Ching =

British composer

- 莊祖欣
- Pronunciation: Zhuāng Zǔxīn
- Born: 1965 (age 59–60); Philippines
- Occupation: composer
- Website: jching.com

Jeffrey Ching (Chinese: 莊祖欣; pinyin: Zhuāng Zǔxīn, born 4 November 1965) is a contemporary classical composer. He was born in the Philippines, to Chinese parents. He is married to the operatic soprano Andión Fernández and has two children.

His opera The Orphan was given in the Theater Erfurt in 2009.

== Selected works ==
- Concerto da camera
- Horologia sinica
- Kunstkabinett
- Notas para una cartografía de Filipinas
- Terra Kytaorum
- Symphony No. 1 in C major (prem. 1981)
- Symphony No. 2, "The Imp of the Perverse"
- Symphony No. 3, "Rituals"
- Symphony No. 4, "Souvenir des Ming"
- Symphony No. 5, "Kunstkammer"
