= Fronimo (software) =

- Original author: Francesco Tribioli
- Stable release: 3.0 (2019-02-04) (Note: As available on mirror site) / 4 February 2019; 7 years ago
- Written in: C++
- Operating system: Windows
- Available in: 5 languages
- List of languages: English; Spanish; French; Italian; German
- Type: Scorewriter
- License: Proprietary
- Website: Official website

Fronimo is a software program for engraving of tablature for lutes, archlute, theorbo and other plucked and bowed instruments.

== History ==
The program was created by the Italian lutenist and astronomer Francesco Tribioli. He named it in honour of Il Fronimo by Vincenzo Galilei, one of the foremost music treatises of the 16th century. One of Galilei's sons, Galileo, was also (amongst other talents) an astronomer, the same as Tribioli.

Version 2 of the program ceased to be updated from February 2005. Version 3 was much improved though it introduced a new native file archive type, .ft3.

== Description ==
The program contains historical fonts for the most common tablatures for the lute and guitar.

A fully functional demo version is available, and is restricted only so far as it is unable to save tablature files. To enable files to be saved a licence must be purchased from the author. Options are available for German, French, Italian and Spanish language interfaces.

There is a large repository of native tablature for the lute held in Fronimo .ft3 format files which can also be utilised by other musical tablature software.

== Reception ==
Specialist lute-tabulature software packages such as Fronimo are sometimes preferred by lutenists if they specialise in 17th century tablature, which can be more difficult to set up in packages such as Sibelius. The licence cost of Fronimo may be thought to be reasonable compared to Sibelius when the functionality of that package is not required.
