= Shennong Mountain =

Mountain in Henan, China

Shennong Mountain (simplified Chinese: 神农山; traditional Chinese: 神農山; pinyin: Shénnóng shān) lies in the northwest of Qinyang, Henan, China. Its main peak is called "Zijin Ding" (simplified Chinese: 紫金顶; traditional Chinese: 紫金頂; lit. 'Purple and Gold Peak'), which is also known as the "North Peak" (北顶), with an altitude of 1028 meters.

It is said that Shennong (lit. 'Divine Farmer'), who taught the ancient Chinese the practices of agriculture, was once there to teach farmers recognize different species of plants.

== History ==
Not only Shennong, but also Laozi who was a mystic philosopher of ancient China, had ever been there. Many great poets such as Han Yu and Li Shangyin had written some poems about Shennong Mountain.

== Location ==
Its geographical coordinates are approximately 35°11′30″~35°19′N, 112°44′~113°02′E.
