= Symphony No. 5, "Kunstkammer" =

Symphony by Jeffrey Ching

Kunstkammer is the title of Jeffrey Ching's Fifth Symphony, composed in Berlin from 12 October 2004 to 6 February 2005, and revised in December 2005

== World premiere and instrumentation ==
Kunstkammer was commissioned by the Kammerorchester Berlin at the behest of the conductor Mikhail Jurowski, who conducted the world premiere in Berlin on 1 March 2006. The scoring is for twenty strings, harp, and twenty-one types of percussion, with solo parts for clarinet, violoncello, and concert accordion for the award-winning Trio NeuKlang, and a vocal part created expressly for the composer's wife, the soprano Andión Fernández.

== Sections of the work ==
The symphony is divided into two movements of about seventeen minutes each, with the following unusual titles:

1. Gift of Mrs. Eric Schroeder, inv. no. 1982.116 (Omaggio a Nicolas Régnier, Girolamo Frescobaldi, ed Athanasius Kircher)
2. L'ambassade ottomane, Paris, Guangxu 16.run 2.07 (Hommage à Kantemiroğlu et Xue Fucheng)

=== I. Gift of Mrs. Eric Schroeder, inv. no. 1982.116 ===
The first movement takes its title from the catalogue description of Self-portrait with a Portrait on an Easel by Nicolas Régnier, a Franco-Flemish artist working in Rome in the 1620s. Both painter and his painted subject look straight in the viewer's direction, which could encompass the live subject of the portrait within the self-portrait, or the painter himself in reflection, or a third-party viewer, or some combination of the three. These split levels of perceptual reality are allegorically represented in the tunings of four string instruments a quarter-tone sharp or flat, and in the alternate or simultaneous soundings of the same musical phrase between them and instruments in normal intonation. As the movement may be construed as a self-portrait of the composer, it is in effect a 'Self-portrait with a Self-portrait with a Portrait on an Easel', incorporating themes based on the letters of both Ching's European and Chinese names (G-E-F-F-Re-C-H and Z-U-X-I-N).

The sub-sections of the first movement are all constructed around compositional devices from the keyboard works of Régnier's contemporary, Girolamo Frescobaldi, organist of St. Peter's in Rome. Occasionally motifs are inverted, reversed, metrically distorted, superimposed as plainchant. In the central section in recitative style (accompanied by clarinet multiphonics, 'cello harmonics, and various vibrato and glissando effects in harp and accordion), fragments from four of Frescobaldi's Arie musicali of 1628–30 are fitted by the soprano to the last Ming emperor's suicide speech of April 1644, which translates:

I am not the prince of a fallen kingdom, but ye are her subjects all. Though I have not been ungenerous to thee, why then, now that we are come to such a pass, is there not one of my ministers here to attend me?

The symphony is named after the pioneering 'Cabinet of Curiosities' (Kunstkammer) assembled by another Roman contemporary, the German Jesuit Athanasius Kircher. He also collected musical canons of extreme artificiality in his Musurgia universalis of 1650. Accordingly, the first movement ends with an extensive six-part canon on five subjects with entries in all twelve tonalities, demonstrating all the themes heard hitherto to be combinable in any vertical or horizontal order. A contrived seventh part for the soprano allows her Frescobaldi fragments to be heard at last with their original Italian text, which closely parallels the words of the unhappy Chinese ruler:

May the hour chime out when you will triumph victorious over the pride of Thrace [i.e., the Turks]….The vain pleasures that I receive out of friendship are at present sources of reproach and accusations…."Alas," she said, "why must it be, O my Lord, that thou dost endure without me these last moments? How shall I be able to live if thou dost die?" …I die without having known who I am, who I was, but I flee not so much death as the anger of others….

=== II. L'ambassade ottomane, Paris, Guangxu 16.run 2.07 ===
The second movement was inspired by the courtesy call of the Chinese ambassador Xue Fucheng at the Ottoman Embassy, Paris on 27 March 1890, as briefly recounted in his diary entry of that date:

The Turkish ambassador confided in me with tears in his eyes. He contended that both England and France are threatening the future of both our countries with their superpower weaponry, and in today’s world there is no justice as far as territorial disputes are concerned. The nation that is best equipped with powerful cannons and fast battleships can devour any large portion of territory at will, and thus all this talk of international law is sheer nonsense.

The movement's themes are drawn entirely from eighteenth-century Turkish and Chinese musical sources—the 352 musical notations of Kantemiroğlu (or Dimitrie Cantemir), a Moldavian prince at Sultan Ahmed III's court, and the numerous pieces of ceremonial music recorded in the Qing dynasty's 1724 publication, Imperially Commissioned True Explication of Music Theory. From the former are excerpted twenty-one pieces, mostly Janissary marches, variously altered and reassembled; from the latter, three pieces of Qing court music in their entirety, slow chords in fourths and fifths heard mostly as harmonic background, but also used to punctuate the Turkish excerpts. All the melodic material uses either the thirty-one-note Ottoman scale with four quarter-tones or the twenty-four-note Qing scale with twelve eighth-tones. To begin with, Turkish and Chinese phrases hear each other out with diplomatic finesse, but eventually overlap and dovetail in a 'new world order' of mutual dependence entailing no loss of melodic autonomy. The soprano chants random Turkish vocables of the ‘terennüm’ type, and then intones Chinese verses celebrating the universal peace symbolised by the Lunar New Year's Day audiences of the Qing emperor.

After a brief pause the Janissary march Hünkar peşrevi (The Sultan's Prelude) is used to generate a twenty-four-part fugue constructed on thirty-six Ottoman modes (makams or terkîbs) and twelve Ottoman rhythmic cycles (usûls). The fugue's twenty-four parts are really twice twelve, in that a melodic voice is invariably paired with a rhythmic partner (usually a string instrument struck with the wood of the bow, or plucked, but also timpani and harp). Of the twenty-nine entries of the theme, twenty-five are extreme metric departures from the original, so that the fugue is concurrently a series of twenty-five variations. The fugue as such, no more Turkish than the European fashions aped in Istanbul during her decadent ‘Tulip period’ (1703–30), does exhibit two indubitably Ottoman peculiarities: The thirty-six rapid changes of mode heard in the solo 'cello part, but also distributed three each among the twelve fugal pairs, derive from the esoteric compositional genre külliyat; and the sudden disappearances and reappearances among the twice-twelve parts after all have entered is in the karabatak or 'cormorant' style (named for the aquatic fowl that so erratically dart in and out of water).

The coda lays out the Ottoman and Qing scales in parallel, first ascending and then descending, while the snare drum plays the solo 'cello's rhythm from the last bar of the fugue, first forwards (while the scales ascend) and then backwards (while they descend). Both rising and falling, the two scales coincide at only seven points, singled out for emphasis by harp and soprano, the latter singing their Italian solfeggio names (do fa sol si do fa sol). After surreal interruptions by each of the twelve fugal pairs in incipit, the last four notes of the descending Ottoman scale turn into a quotation of a Frescobaldian motif from the first movement, ushering the whole symphony to a full close on C.
