= Reinbert Evers =

German musician (1949–2022)

Reinbert Evers (23 August 1949 – 28 October 2022) was a German classical guitarist, specialising in contemporary music.

== Career ==
Evers was born in Dortmund. He first studied in Düsseldorf with Maritta Kersting, then in Vienna with Karl Scheit. In 1976, he was appointed Professor of Guitar at the Hochschule für Musik Detmold, Dep. Münster, and in 1980 he received the Young Artists Award from the City of Dortmund. In 1998 and 2000 he was lecturer in guitar at the Darmstadt International Summer Courses for New Music. He has served since 1995 as Dean of the Hochschule für Musik Detmold. He is founder and artistic director of the "Europäisches Musikfest Münsterland", an annual international festival that has been held since 1999.

Evers specialized in the performance of avantgarde contemporary music for the guitar and has given numerous first performances of modern works, including many pieces especially written for him. This includes works by Gunther Becker, Edison Denisov, Tilo Medek, Luca Lombardi, Manfred Trojahn, and others.
