= Andión Fernández =

Philippine opera soprano

Andión Fernández (born January 2, 1969) is a Spanish Filipina operatic soprano, born in Manila.

A soloist of the Deutsche Oper Berlin since 2001, she graduated with honors from the Hochschule der Künste, Berlin, and has studied voice with Karan Armstrong and Ira Hartmann, and contemporary music with Aribert Reimann.

She is a prizewinner of Operalia International Opera Competition (Plácido Domingo World Opera Contest, Hamburg) and the Cardiff Singer of the World competition.

The major international opera houses she has sung in include the Deutsche Oper Berlin, the Deutsche Oper am Rhein, the Deutsche Staatsoper Berlin, the Nuremberg Opera, the Gulbenkian Auditorium in Lisbon, the Festwochen Herrenhausen in Hannover, the Schloß Sanssouci in Potsdam, the Kallang Theatre and Victoria Theatre in Singapore, the Festspielhaus in Baden Baden, and the Gran Teatre del Liceu in Barcelona.

Among her major roles are Susanna (Le nozze di Figaro), Niklausse (Les contes d'Hoffmann), Hänsel (Hänsel und Gretel), Micaela (Carmen), Fox (The Cunning Little Vixen), and Pamina (Die Zauberflöte).

She has worked with many distinguished conductors, including Alberto Zedda, Christian Thielemann, Marcello Viotti, Kent Nagano, Christopher Hogwood, Leopold Hager, and Mikhail Jurowski. As Agnes in Mikhail Jurowski’s world premiere recording of Emil von Reznicek’s Ritter Blaubart she received rave reviews.

She is married to composer Jeffrey Ching, and sang the solo part in his Symphony No. 5, "Kunstkammer" at its world premiere under Mikhail Jurowski in March 2006. She sang the title role in Ching's new opera The Orphan, commissioned by Theater Erfurt, Germany, for its 2009-2010 season.
