= Fronimo Dialogo =

Front cover of the Fronimo Dialogo.

The Fronimo Dialogo di Vincentio Galilei (Vincenzo Galilei) is an instructional book on playing, composing and intabulating vocal music for the lute.

The first edition was printed by Girolamo Scotto in Venice with the full title FRONIMO DIALOGO / DI VINCENTIO GALILEI FIORENTINO, / NEL QUALE SI CONTENGONO LE VERE, / et necessarie regole del Intavolare la Musica nel Liuto. While the title page bears the date 1568, the final page confusingly bears the date 1569. Apparently, although the manuscript was completed by Galilei in the Autumn of 1568, the official letter of privilege allowing the publication of the book was received only in December, and the printing actually took place in 1569. In addition, still in 1569, Girolamo Scotto broke the book into two parts, selling a collection of 30 musical selections from near the end of the book and the Dialogo separately. A second edition of the complete Dialogo, with significant revisions, was printed in 1584 by the “heir of Girolamo Scotto,” under the title FRONIMO / DIALOGO / DI VINCENTIO GALILEI / NOBILE FIORENTINO, / SOPRA L'ARTE DEL BENE INTAVOLARE, / ET RETTAMENTE SONARE LA MUSICA / Negli strumenti artificiali si di corde come di fiato, & in particulare nel Liuto.

Unlike other lute instruction manuals of the 16th century, each of the editions of Fronimo contains quite a large amount of music. Galilei provided examples in order to illustrate how he believed compositions should be structured and how intabulations should be made from existing compositions. The examples range from a few notes or measures in length up to complete compositions in either mensural notation or lute tablature. In the 1584 edition, for example, there are 48 pieces in tablature form sprinkled throughout the text (including a set of 24 ricercars in all the possible tonalities) and a collection of 60 more pieces placed all together at the end. The 1568 edition includes a total of 96 complete pieces, many of which are different from those chosen for the 1584 edition.

== See also ==
- Lesson
- Music education

== Sources ==
- 1568/69 edition
- 1584 edition
- Dialogo sopra l'arte del bene intavolare
- The Lute Society of America
