= List of compositions by Sergei Prokofiev =

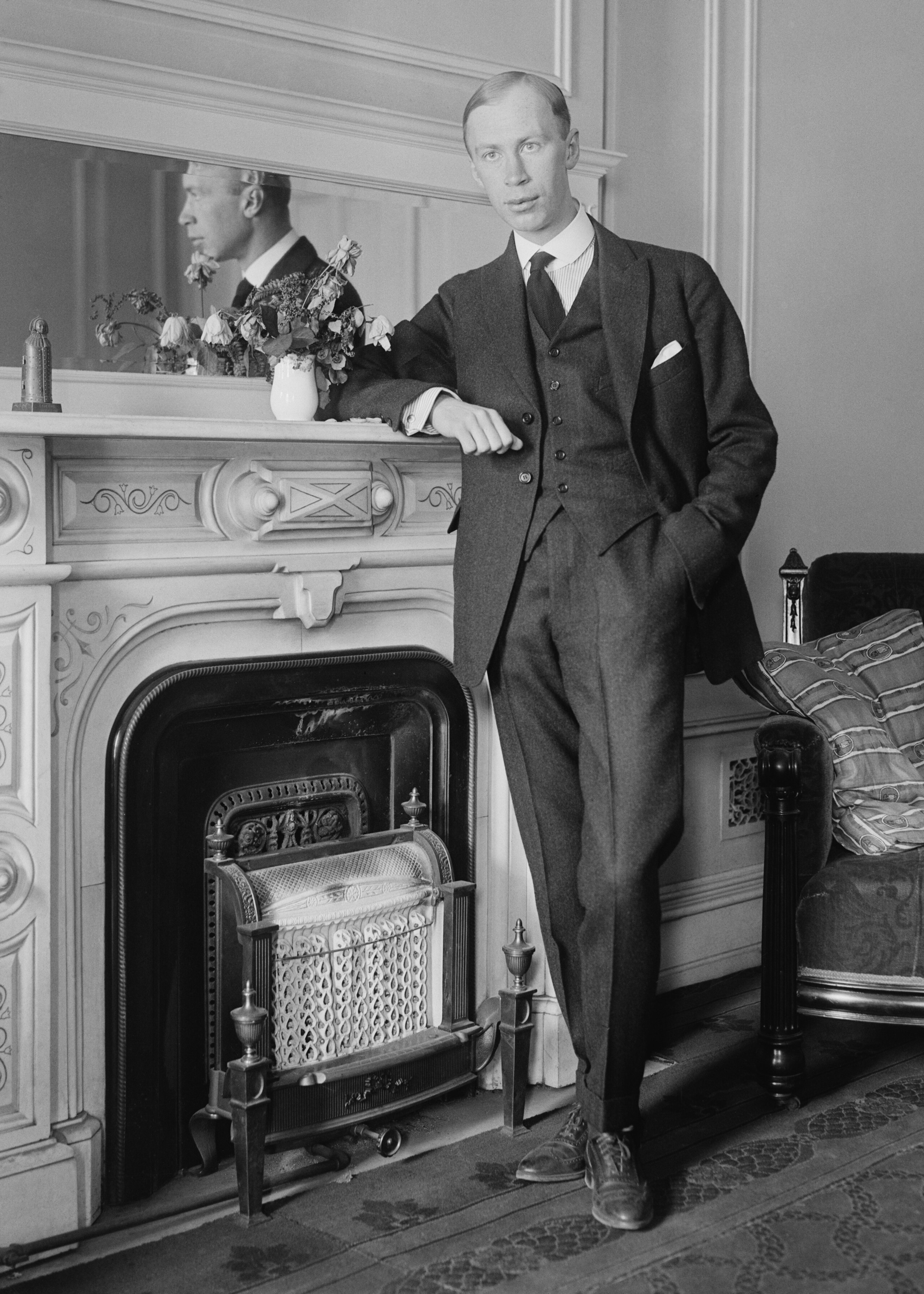
Sergei Prokofiev, ca. 1918

This is a list of musical compositions by the 20th-century Russian composer Sergei Prokofiev.

== By genre ==
=== Operas ===
- The Giant (1900; only vocal score survives)
- On Desert Islands (1900–02; unfinished)
- A Feast in Time of Plague (1903, rev. 1908–09; unfinished)
- Undina (1904–07)
- Maddalena, Op. 13 (1911–13; unfinished)
- Igrok (The Gambler), Op. 24 (1915–16, rev. 1927); after Fyodor Dostoevsky
- The Love for Three Oranges, Op. 33 (1919)
- The Fiery Angel, Op. 37 (1919–27)
- Semyon Kotko, Op. 81 (1939)
- Betrothal in a Monastery, Op. 86 (1940–41)
- War and Peace, Op. 91 (1941–52); after Leo Tolstoy
- Khan Buzay (1942; unfinished)
- The Story of a Real Man, Op. 117 (1947–48)
- Distant Seas (1948; unfinished)

=== Ballets ===
- Ala i Lolli (1915, abandoned and rewritten as the Scythian Suite)
- Chout / Tale of the Jester, Op. 21 (1915, rev. 1920)
- Trapeze (1924, music reused in the Quintet for Oboe, Clarinet, Violin, Viola and Double Bass)
- Le pas d'acier / The Steel Step, Op. 41 (1926)
- Le fils prodigue / The Prodigal Son, Op. 46 (1929)
- On the Dnieper, Op. 51 (1931)
- Romeo and Juliet, Op. 64 (1935, classified as a Soviet choreodrama, or drambalet)
- Cinderella, Op. 87 (1944)
- Tale of the Stone Flower, Op. 118 (1953)

=== Incidental music ===
- Egyptian Nights suite, Op. 61 (1934)
- Boris Godunov, Op. 70bis (1936)
- Eugene Onegin, Op. 71 (1936)
- Hamlet, Op. 77 (1937–38)

=== Film music ===
- Lieutenant Kijé, Op. 60 (1934), also arranged as an orchestral suite (see below)
- The Queen of Spades, Op. 70a (1936), after Pushkin
- Alexander Nevsky, Op. 78 (1938), film directed by Sergei Eisenstein (also exists in the form of a cantata, see below)
- Lermontov (1941)
- Kotovsky (1942)
- Tonya (1942)
- The Partisans in the Ukrainian Steppes (1942)
- Ivan the Terrible, Op. 116 (1942–45), film directed by Sergei Eisenstein (also exists in various concert forms arranged by various people)

=== Symphonies ===
- Symphonies – two juvenile: First movement of Symphony in G (1902) and Symphony (1908)
- Symphony No. 1 in D Classical, Op. 25 (1916–17)
- Symphony No. 2 in D minor, Op. 40 (1924–25)
- Symphony No. 3 in C minor, Op. 44 (1928)
- Symphony No. 4 in C (original version), Op. 47 (1929–30)
- Symphony No. 5 in B♭, Op. 100 (1944)
- Symphony No. 6 in E♭ minor, Op. 111 (1945–47)
- Symphony No. 4 in C (revised version), Op. 112 (1947)
- Symphony No. 7 in C♯ minor, Op. 131 (1951–52)
- Symphony No. 2 in D minor (revised version), Op. 136 (1953; unrealized)

=== Orchestral suites ===
- Suites (3) from "Romeo and Juliet"
  - Suite No. 1, Op. 64bis (1936)
  - Suite No. 2, Op. 64ter (1936)
  - Suite No. 3, Op. 101 (1946)
- Suites (3) from "Cinderella"
  - Suite No. 1, Op. 107 (1946)
  - Suite No. 2, Op. 108 (1946)
  - Suite No. 3, Op. 109 (1946)
- Suites (4) from "The Tale of the Stone Flower"
  - Wedding Suite, Op. 126 (1951)
  - Gypsy Fantasy, Op. 127 (1951)
  - Urals Rhapsody, Op. 128 (1951)
  - The Mistress of Copper Mountain Op. 129 (1951; unfinished)
- Scythian Suite, Op. 20 (from "Ala i Lolli") (1914–15)
- Suite from "Chout", Op. 21bis (1920)
- Suite from "The Love for Three Oranges", Op. 33bis (1919, rev. 1924)
- Vocal Suite from "The Fiery Angel", Op. 37bis (1923; incomplete)
- Suite from "Le pas d'acier", Op. 41bis (1926)
- Suite from "The Prodigal Son", Op. 46bis (1929)
- Suite from "The Gambler" ("Four Portraits and Denouement"), Op. 49 (1931)
- Suite from "On the Dnieper", Op. 51bis (1933)
- Suite from "Lieutenant Kijé", Op. 60 (1934)
- Suite from "Egyptian Nights", Op. 61 (1938)
- Summer Day, Op. 65bis (1941) (suite from Music for Children)
- Suite from "Semyon Kotko", Op. 81bis (1941)
- Waltz Suite, Op. 110 (1946) (includes waltzes from "War and Peace," "Cinderella," and "Lermontov")
- Summer Night, suite from "Betrothal in a Monastery", Op. 123 (1950)

=== Other orchestral works ===
- Sinfonietta in A (original version), Op. 5 (1909)
- Dreams, Op. 6 (1910)
- Autumnal, Op. 8 (1910)
- Andante from Piano Sonata No. 4, arranged for orchestra, Op. 29bis (1934)
- Overture on Hebrew Themes, Op. 34bis (based on chamber version) (1934)
- American Overture, Op. 42 (1926), for 17 instruments
- American Overture, Op. 42bis (1928), for full orchestra
- Divertissement, Op. 43 (1925–29) (also exists in a piano transcription, see transcriptions for piano below)
- Sinfonietta in A (revised version of Op. 5), Op. 48 (1929)
- Andante from String Quartet No. 1, arranged for string orchestra, Op. 50bis (1930)
- Symphonic Song, Op. 57 (1933)
- Russian Overture, Op. 72 (1936) (2 differently orchestrated versions)
- Symphonic March, Op. 88 (1941)
- The Year 1941, Op. 90 (1941)
- Ode to the End of the War, Op. 105 (1945), for winds, 8 harps, 4 pianos, percussion, and double basses
- Thirty Years, Op. 113 (1947), festive poem for orchestra
- Pushkin Waltzes, Op. 120 (1949)
- The Meeting of the Volga and the Don, Op. 130 (1951), festive poem for orchestra

=== Concerti ===
- Piano:
  - Piano Concerto No. 1 in D♭, Op. 10 (1911–12)
  - Piano Concerto No. 2 in G minor, Op. 16 (1912–13, lost, re-written in 1923)
  - Piano Concerto No. 3 in C, Op. 26 (1917–21)
  - Piano Concerto No. 4 in B♭, Op. 53 (1931), for left hand (written for Paul Wittgenstein)
  - Piano Concerto No. 5 in G, Op. 55 (1932)
  - Piano Concerto No. 6, Op. 134 (1953–unfinished)
- Violin:
  - Violin Concerto No. 1 in D, Op. 19 (1916–17)
  - Violin Concerto No. 2 in G minor, Op. 63 (1935)
- Cello:
  - Cello Concerto in E minor, Op. 58 (1933–38)
  - Symphony-Concerto for Cello and Orchestra in E minor, Op. 125 (1950–52)
  - Cello Concertino in G minor, Op. 132 (1953–unfinished) (one version completed by Kabalevsky, another by Vladimir Blok)

=== Vocal orchestral ===
- Two Poems for Female Chorus and Orchestra, Op. 7 (1909–10)
- The Ugly Duckling, Op. 18 (1914), for soprano and orchestra
- Seven, They Are Seven, Op. 30 (1917–18, rev. 1933), cantata for tenor, chorus, and large orchestra
- Melodie, Op. 35bis (1920), for female voice and orchestra
- Vocal Suite from The Fiery Angel, Op. 37bis (1923, incomplete)
- Peter and the Wolf, Op. 67 (1936), a children's story for narrator and orchestra
- Cantata for the 20th Anniversary of the October Revolution, Op. 74 (1936–37), cantata for 2 choruses, orchestra, military band, accordion band, and percussion band
- Songs of Our Days, Op. 76 (1937), for chorus and orchestra
- Alexander Nevsky, Op. 78 (1939), cantata for mezzo-soprano, chorus, and orchestra
- Zdravitsa, Op. 85 (1939), cantata for chorus and orchestra (also known as 'Hail to Stalin')
- Ballad of an Unknown Boy, Op. 93 (1942–43), for soloists, chorus, and orchestra
- Flourish, Mighty Land, Op. 114 (1947), cantata for chorus and orchestra
- Winter Bonfire, Op. 122 (1949–50), for boy's choir and small orchestra
- On Guard for Peace, Op. 124 (1950), cantata for chorus and orchestra

=== Choral ===
- Six Songs, Op. 66 (1935)
- Seven Songs and a March, Op. 89 (1941–42)
- National Anthem and All-Union Hymn, Op. 98 (1943 and 1946)
- Soldiers' Marching Song, Op. 121 (1950)

=== Songs ===
- Branch of Palestine. Romance for voice and piano on words by Mikhail Lermontov (sketches) (1903)
- Oh, No, Not Fignev, Not Yuzhin. Joke sketch for voice and piano December 1903
- Look Those Downy Feathers. Sketch for voice and piano on the composer’s words (1903)
- I Am No More the Ardent Lover. Romance for voice and piano on words by Alexander Pushkin (sketches) (1903)
- The Spreading Oak. Romance for voice and piano on words by Apollon Maikov (1906-1907)
- Two Poems, Op. 9 (1910–11)
- The Ugly Duckling, Op. 18 (1914)
- Five Poems, Op. 23 (1915)
- Five Poems after Akhmatova, Op. 27 (1916)
- Five Songs Without Words, Op. 35 (1920)
- Five Poems after Bal'mont, Op. 36 (1921)
- Five Kazakh Songs (1927)
- Two Songs from Lieutenant Kijé, Op. 60bis (1934)
- Three Children's Songs, Op. 68 (1936)
- Three Romances after Pushkin, Op. 73 (1936)
- Three Songs from Alexander Nevsky, Op. 78bis (1939)
- Seven Songs, Op. 79 (1939)
- Twelve Russian Folksongs, Op. 104 (1944)
- Two Duets, Op. 106 (1945)
- Broad and Deep the River Flows (1957)

=== Chamber music ===
- Humoresque scherzo, Op. 12bis (1915) (for four bassoons)
- Overture on Hebrew Themes, Op. 34 (1919) (for clarinet, string quartet and piano)
- Quintet in G minor, Op. 39 (1924) (for oboe, clarinet, violin, viola and double bass)
- String Quartet No. 1 in B minor, Op. 50 (1930)
- Sonata for Two Violins in C, Op. 56 (1932)
- String Quartet No. 2 in F, Op. 92 (1941)

=== Instrumental ===
- Violin
  - Sonata for Violin and Piano in C minor ––– · Minuetto · Finale Prestissimo (January-February 1903)
  - Song No.1 for violin and piano in D minor (July 1903)
  - Sonata for Violin and Piano (first movement) (1907)
  - Five Melodies for Violin and Piano, Op. 35bis (1925)
  - Violin Sonata No. 1 in F minor, Op. 80 (1946)
  - Violin Sonata No. 2 in D, Op. 94a (1943; based on Flute Sonata in D, Op. 94)
  - Sonata for Solo Violin / Unison Violins in D, Op. 115 (1947)
- Cello
  - Ballade for Cello and Piano, Op. 15 (1912)
  - Adagio for Cello and Piano, Op. 97bis (1944)
  - Cello Sonata in C, Op. 119 (1949)
  - Sonata for Solo Cello in C♯ minor (completed posthumously by Vladimir Blok), Op. 134 (1952, completed 1972)
- Flute
  - Flute Sonata in D, Op. 94 (1943)

=== Piano sonatas ===
- Piano Sonatas – six juvenile: 1904, 1907 (revised for Op.1), 1907 (revised for Op.28), 1907–08, 1908 (revised for Op.29), 1908–09
- Piano Sonata No. 1 in F minor, Op. 1 (1907–09)
- Piano Sonata No. 2 in D minor, Op. 14 (1912)
- Piano Sonata No. 3 in A minor, Op. 28 (1907–17)
- Piano Sonata No. 4 in C minor, Op. 29 (1908–17)
- Piano Sonata No. 5 in C major (original version), Op. 38 (1923)
- Piano Sonata No. 6 in A major, Op. 82 (1939–40)
- Piano Sonata No. 7 in B♭ major Stalingrad, Op. 83 (1939–42)
- Piano Sonata No. 8 in B♭ major, Op. 84 (1939–44)
- Piano Sonata No. 9 in C major, Op. 103 (1947)
- Piano Sonata No. 5 in C major (revised version), Op. 135 (1952–53)
- Piano Sonata No. 10 in E minor, Op. 137 (unfinished) (1952)
- Piano Sonata No. 11, Op. 138 (unrealized)

=== Other piano works ===
- Indian Gallop in F major (1896)
- March (I) in C major (1897)
- Waltz (I) in C major (1897)
- Rondo in C major (1897)
- March (II) in B minor/D major (1898)
- March (I) four hands in C major (1898)
- Polka in G major (1898-1899)
- Waltz (II) in G major (1898-1899)
- March (II) four hands in C major (1898-1899)
- Waltz (III) in C major/G major (1899)
- March (III) four hands in F major (1899)
- Piece for piano four hands in F major (1899)
- Piece for piano four hands in D minor (1900)
- March (III)(1900)
- Piece for piano four hands and zither (unfinished) (1900)
- Piece (1901)
- Bagatelle for piano four hands in C minor (1902)
- March from ‘Desert Islands’ (1900-1902)
- Twelve Songs, Series I (1902)
- Bagatelle in A minor (1902)
- Twelve Songs, Series II (1903)
- Twelve Songs', Series III (1903-1904)
- Variations on the Theme "Chizhik" (1904)
- Twelve Songs, Series IV (1905)
- Polka mélancolique in F♯ minor (1905)
- Twelve Songs, Series V (1906)
- Reproach in A minor (1907)
- Chant sans paroles in D♭ major (1907)
- Intermezzo in A major (1907)
- Humoresque in F minor (1907)
- Piece Without Title in B♭ minor (1907)
- Oriental Song in G minor (1907)
- Piece Without Title for piano [C minor] (1907)
- Four Piano Pieces (‘Tale’, ‘Joke’, ‘March’, ‘The Ghost’) (1907-1908)
- Fugue (exam piece) in D major (1908)
- Andante in C minor (unfinished) (1908)
- Two Piano Pieces (‘Snowball’, ‘Prayer’) (1908)
- Four Piano Pieces (‘Reminiscences’, ‘Elan’, ‘Despair’, ‘Suggestion diabolique’) (1908)
- Four Etudes for Piano, Op. 2 (1909)
- Four Pieces for Piano, Op. 3 (1911)
- Four Pieces for Piano, Op. 4 (1910–12)
- Toccata in D minor, Op. 11 (1912)
- Ten Pieces for Piano, Op. 12 (1906–13)
- Sarcasms, five pieces for piano, Op. 17 (1912–14)
- Visions fugitives, 20 pieces for piano, Op. 22 (1915–17)
- Tales of an Old Grandmother, Op. 31 (1918)
- Four Pieces for Piano, Op. 32 (1918)
- Schubert Waltzes (1920)
- Fantasia on Scheherazade (1926)
- Things in Themselves, 2 pieces for piano, Op. 45 (1928)
- Six Pieces for Piano, Op. 52 (1928-31)
- Two Sonatinas for Piano, Op. 54 (1931–32)
- Three Pieces for Piano, Op. 59 (1933–34)
- Pensées, 3 pieces for piano, Op. 62 (1933–34)
- Music for Children, 12 easy pieces, Op. 65 (1935)
- Dumka (after 1933)

=== Transcriptions for piano ===
- March and Scherzo from "The Love for Three Oranges", Op. 33ter (1922)
- Divertissement, Op. 43bis (1938)
- Six Pieces for Piano, Op. 52 from a variety of sources (1930–31)
- Ten Pieces from "Romeo and Juliet", Op. 75 (1937)
- Gavotte from "Hamlet", Op. 77bis (1938)
- Three Pieces from "Cinderella", Op. 95 (1942)
- Three Pieces for Piano, Op. 96 from "War and Peace" and "Lermontov" (1941–42)
- Ten Pieces from "Cinderella", Op. 97 (1943)
- Six Pieces from "Cinderella", Op. 102 (1944)

=== Band music ===
- Four Marches, Op. 69 (1935–37)
- March in A♭, Op. 89bis (1941)
- March in B♭, Op. 99 (1943–44) (Orchestral version transcribed by D. Wilson Ochoa, 2007)

== By opus number ==
Opus number	Work	Year
1	Piano Sonata No. 1 in F minor	1909
2	Four Etudes for Piano	1909
3	Four Pieces for Piano	1907-1911
4	Four Pieces for Piano	1908–12
5	Sinfonietta in A major (original version)	1909, rev. 1914–15
6	Dreams, for orchestra	1910
7	Two Poems, for female choir and orchestra	1909–10
8	Autumnal, for orchestra	1910, rev. 1915, 1934
9	Two Poems, for voice and piano	1910–11
10	Piano Concerto No. 1 in D♭ major	1911–12
11	Toccata in D minor, for piano	1912
12	Ten Pieces for Piano	1906–13
12bis	Humoresque scherzo, for four bassoons	1915
13	Maddalena (opera)	1911–13
14	Piano Sonata No. 2 in D minor	1912
15	Ballade in C minor, for cello and piano	1912
16	Piano Concerto No. 2 in G minor	1912–13 (lost), reconstructed in 1923
17	Sarcasms, five pieces for piano	1912–14
18	The Ugly Duckling, for soprano and piano/orchestra	1914
19	Violin Concerto No. 1 in D major	1916–17
–	Ala i Lolli, ballet (withdrawn)	1914–15
20	Scythian Suite, orchestral suite from Ala i Lolli	1914–15
21	Chout, ballet in 6 scenes	1915, rev. 1920
21bis	Suite from Chout, orchestral suite	1920
22	Visions fugitives, twenty pieces for piano	1915–17
23	Five Poems, for voice and piano	1915
24	The Gambler (after Dostoevsky), opera in 4 acts	1915–17, rev. 1927–28
25	Symphony No. 1 in D major Classical	1916–17
26	Piano Concerto No. 3 in C major	1917–21
27	Five Poems after Akhmatova, for voice and piano	1916
28	Piano Sonata No. 3 in A minor	1917
29	Piano Sonata No. 4 in C minor	1917
29bis	Andante from Piano Sonata No. 4, for orchestra	1934
30	Seven, They are Seven, cantata	1917–18, rev. 1933
31	Tales of an Old Grandmother, four pieces for piano	1918
32	Four Pieces for Piano	1918
33	The Love for Three Oranges, opera in 4 acts	1919
33bis	Suite from The Love for Three Oranges, orchestral suite	1919, rev. 1924
33ter	March and Scherzo from The Love for Three Oranges, for piano	1922
34	Overture on Hebrew Themes, for clarinet, string quartet, and piano	1919
34bis	Overture on Hebrew Themes, for orchestra	1934
35	Five Songs without Words, for female voice and piano	1920
35bis	Five Melodies, for violin and piano	1925
36	Five Poems after Bal'mont, for voice and piano	1921
37	The Fiery Angel, opera	1919–23, rev. 1926–27
37bis	Vocal Suite from The Fiery Angel, orchestral suite with voice	1923, incomplete
38	Piano Sonata No. 5 in C major (original version)	1923
–	Trapeze, ballet	1924
39	Quintet in G minor (based on Trapeze), for oboe, clarinet, violin, viola, and double bass	1924
40	Symphony No. 2 in D minor Iron and Steel	1924–25
41	Le pas d'acier (The Steel Step), ballet	1925–26
41bis	Suite from Le pas d'acier, orchestral suite	1926
42	American Overture, for 17 instrumentalists	1926
42bis	American Overture, for orchestra	1928
43	Divertissement, for orchestra	1925–29
43bis	Divertissement, for piano	1938
44	Symphony No. 3 in C minor	1928
45	Things in Themselves (after Immanuel Kant), two pieces for piano	1928
46	The Prodigal Son, ballet in 3 scenes	1928–29
46bis	Suite from The Prodigal Son, orchestral suite	1929
47	Symphony No. 4 in C major (original version)	1929–30
48	Sinfonietta in A major (revised version)	1929
49	Suite from The Gambler, ("Four Portraits and Denouement")	1931
50	String Quartet No. 1 in B minor	1930
50bis	Andante from String Quartet No. 1, for string orchestra	?1930
51	On the Dnieper, ballet in 2 scenes	1930–31
51bis	Suite from On the Dnieper, orchestral suite	1933
52	Six Transcriptions for Piano	1930–31
53	Piano Concerto No. 4 in B♭ major, for left hand	1931
54	Piano Sonatinas (No. 1 in E minor; No. 2 in G major)	1931–32
55	Piano Concerto No. 5 in G major	1931–32
56	Sonata for Two Violins in C major	1932
57	Symphonic Song, for orchestra	1933
58	Cello Concerto in E minor	1933–38
59	Three Pieces for Piano	1933–34
–	Lieutenant Kijé, film score	1933
60	Suite from Lieutenant Kijé, orchestral suite	1934
60bis	Two Songs from Lieutenant Kijé, for voice and piano	1934
–	Egyptian Nights, incidental music	1934
61	Suite from Egyptian Nights, orchestral suite	1934
62	Pensées (Thoughts), three pieces for piano	1933–34
63	Violin Concerto No. 2 in G minor	1935
64	Romeo and Juliet, ballet in 4 acts	1935–36
64bis	Suite from Romeo and Juliet No. 1	1936
64ter	Suite from Romeo and Juliet No. 2	1936
65	Music for Children, twelve easy pieces for piano	1935
65bis	Summer Day, orchestral suite based on seven pieces from Music for Children	1941
66	Six Songs, for choir and piano	1935
67	Peter and the Wolf, for narrator and orchestra	1936
68	Three Children's Songs, for voice and piano	1936
69	Four Marches, for band	1935–37
70	The Queen of Spades, film score	1936
70bis	Boris Godunov, incidental music	1936
71	Eugene Onegin, incidental music	1936
72	Russian Overture, for orchestra	1936, rev. 1937
73	Three Romances after Pushkin, for voice and piano	1936
74	Cantata for the 20th Anniversary of the October Revolution	1936–37
75	Ten Pieces from Romeo and Juliet, for piano	1937
76	Songs of Our Days, for choir and piano/orchestra	1937
77	Hamlet, incidental music	1937–38
77bis	Gavotte from Hamlet, for piano	1938
–	Alexander Nevsky, film score (director: Sergei Eisenstein)	1938
78	Alexander Nevsky, cantata	1939
79	Seven Songs, for choir and piano	1939
80	Violin Sonata No. 1 in F minor	1938–46
81	Semyon Kotko, opera	1939
81bis	Suite from Semyon Kotko, orchestral suite	1941
82	Piano Sonata No. 6 in A major	1939–40
83	Piano Sonata No. 7 in B♭ major Stalingrad	1939–42
84	Piano Sonata No. 8 in B♭ major	1939–44
85	Zdravitsa (Hail to Stalin), cantata	1939
86	Betrothal in a Monastery, opera in 4 acts	1940–41
87	Cinderella, ballet in 3 acts	1940–44
88	Symphonic March, for orchestra	1941
89	Seven Songs and a March, for choir and piano	1941–42
89bis	March in A♭ major, for band	?1941
90	The Year 1941, orchestral suite	1941
91	War and Peace (after Tolstoy), opera in 13 scenes	1941–43, rev. 1946–52
92	String Quartet No. 2 in F major	1941
93	Ballad of an Unknown Boy, for soprano, tenor, choir, and orchestra	1942–43
94	Flute Sonata in D major	1943
94bis	Violin Sonata No. 2 in D major (based on Flute Sonata)	1944
95	Three Pieces from Cinderella, for piano	1942
96	Three Transcriptions for Piano (from War and Peace and Lermontov)	1941–42
97	Ten Pieces from Cinderella, for piano	1943
98	National Anthem and All-Union Hymn	1943 and 1946
99	March in B♭ major, for band	1943–44
100	Symphony No. 5 in B♭ major	1944
101	Suite from Romeo and Juliet No. 3	1946
102	Six Pieces from Cinderella, for piano	1944
103	Piano Sonata No. 9 in C major	1947
104	Twelve Russian Folk Songs, for voice and piano	1944
105	Ode to the End of the War, for winds, percussion, 8 harps, 4 pianos, and double basses	1945
106	Two Duets, for tenor, bass, and piano	1945
107	Suite from Cinderella No. 1	1946
108	Suite from Cinderella No. 2	1946
109	Suite from Cinderella No. 3	1946
110	Waltz Suite, six waltzes for orchestra	1946
111	Symphony No. 6 in E♭ minor	1945–47
112	Symphony No. 4 in C major (revised version)	1947
113	Thirty Years, festive poem for orchestra	1947
114	Flourish, Mighty Land, cantata	1947
115	Sonata for Unison Violins (or Solo Violin) in D major	1947
116	Ivan the Terrible, film score (director: Sergei Eisenstein)	1942–45
117	The Story of a Real Man, opera in 4 acts	1947–48
118	The Tale of the Stone Flower, ballet in 4 acts	1948–53
119	Cello Sonata in C major	1949
120	Pushkin Waltzes, two waltzes for orchestra	1949
121	Soldiers' Marching Song	1950
122	Winter Bonfire, children's suite for boys' choir and orchestra	1949–50
123	Summer Night, orchestral suite from Betrothal in a Monastery	1950
124	On Guard for Peace, oratorio	1950
125	Symphony-Concerto for Cello and Orchestra in E minor	1950–51, rev. 1952
126	Wedding Suite, orchestral suite from The Tale of the Stone Flower	1951
127	Gypsy Fantasy, orchestral suite from The Tale of the Stone Flower	1951
128	Ural Rhapsody, orchestral suite from The Tale of the Stone Flower	1951
129	The Mistress of the Copper Mountain, orchestral suite from The Tale of the Stone Flower	unrealized
130	The Meeting of the Volga and the Don, festive poem for orchestra	1951
131	Symphony No. 7 in C♯ minor	1951–52
132	Cello Concertino in G minor	1952, incomplete
133 (or 134)	Sonata for Solo Cello in C♯ minor	1952, incomplete
134 (or 133)	Piano Concerto No. 6, for two pianos and string orchestra	1952, incomplete
135	Piano Sonata No. 5 in C major (revised version)	1952–53
136	Symphony No. 2 in D minor Iron and Steel (revised version)	unrealized
137	Piano Sonata No. 10 in E minor	?1953, incomplete
138	Piano Sonata No. 11	unrealized
