= Piano Sonata in D minor =

Piano Sonata in D minor may refer to:

- Piano Sonata No. 17 (Beethoven)
- Piano Sonata No. 2 (Prokofiev)
- Piano Sonata No. 1 (Rachmaninoff)
