= Music for Children (disambiguation) =

Music for Children may refer to:

- Music for children, as music genre, see Children's music
- Music for Children (Prokofiev), piano pieces by Sergei Prokofiev
- Music for Children (album), album by John Zorn

== See also ==
- For Children, piano pieces by Béla Bartók
