= Piano Sonata No. 3 (Prokofiev) =

Sonata composed for the piano in A minor (1917)

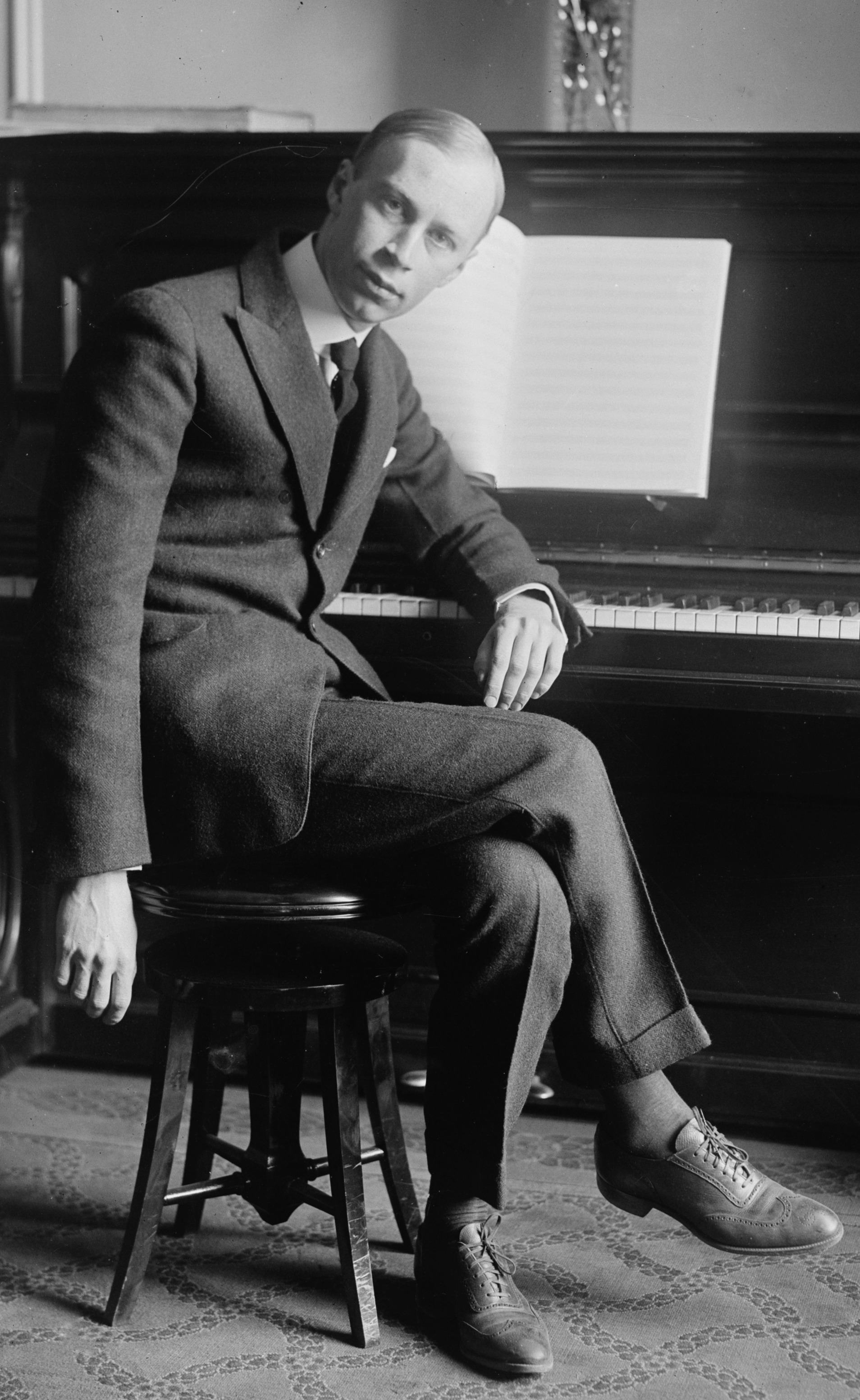
Sergei Prokofiev c. 1918

Sergei Prokofiev's Piano Sonata No. 3 in A minor, Op. 28 (1917) is a sonata composed for solo piano, using sketches dating from 1907. Prokofiev gave the première of this in Saint Petersburg on 15 April 1918, during a week-long festival of his music sponsored by the Conservatory.

== Historical background ==
Early in his creative life, Prokofiev developed a highly individual way of writing for the piano. Though the differences between the piano textures of his early and late works are palpable, the main qualities of his piano writing are recognizable throughout. Prokofiev composed this piece in 1917, the same year as his fourth sonata. Both of these sonatas bear the subtitle "From the Old Notebooks". This sonata derives from works that he composed as a teenager. In a letter to Miaskovsky on 26 June 1907, Prokofiev wrote about Piano Sonata no. 3: "It will remain...in one movement: pretty, interesting, and practical". This sonata reveals most of the traditional sections in a sonata-form, within which Prokofiev employs his own blend of nineteenth- century Russian and twentieth-century characteristics.

This third sonata was a clear departure of his previous humorous style with his second sonata from 1912. After the energetic and virtuoso third sonata, his fourth sonata and pieces that followed it were a clear departure from the style of his third sonata. He would compose extremely lyrical and introverted pieces after this.

== Movements (sub-movements) ==
Allegro tempestoso – Moderato – Allegro tempestoso – Moderato – Più lento – Più animato – Allegro I – Poco più mosso

== Musical form ==
The sonata is the shortest of his piano sonatas, being in a single movement in sonata form and lasting approximately 7–8 minutes, but it is one of the most technically demanding pieces Prokofiev ever wrote for the piano. The piece opens with a blasting E major chord for the entire first and second bars and then goes into a toccata-like melody for the next few bars. This repeats with some variation again after that, and a tonic preparation for two bars leads to the first theme. The first theme, consists of a fairly recognizable harmony with a leaping melody in the right hand. The first theme is mainly in a playful and soft character with some dynamic fluctuations towards the end of the first theme. It contains some motives that reoccur near the end of the piece.

The second theme resembles the second movement in a typical three-movement sonata cycle, and opens in a slow and legato chromatic scale with sustained bass notes of G♯, D, and G, marked Moderato. The slow, lyrical melody opens in the relative major, then repeats itself with the same melody but with the harmony in A minor. The slow theme also consists of leaping harmony in the left hand, and the theme ends in C major after some progressions in C major.

The third theme, which is like a development, opens in a blasting, fortissimo chromatic harmony with a march-like melody in D minor with the same rhythmic motives alternating between hands. After that, there comes a rapid scale based on the notes F–E–D–F with double thirds in the bass. It then repeats a perfect fifth up, then proceeding with rapidly repeated Cs on the right hand on the upper registers. Following that is a series of arpeggios that suggest a melody or chord progression, then proceeding with a lyrical melody that comes from the second theme.

The climax is preceded with several leaping chords that gets transposed after a few bars. In the climax, marked fff, it starts with a rapid arpeggio in the supertonic 7th chord relative to C major, following pedal tones on C in the right hand and subsequent transpositions by seconds. It ends with a blasting fortissimo cluster-like chord, E–F–A–B–D–E (right hand), with E on the bass, then closing the theme with a similar chord on a lower octave, E–G–B–D (left hand), F–A–B–D–E (right hand).

The next theme and final theme begins with E tied from the previous chord, then with detached triplet eighths marked pianissimo that come from the piano parts of the first theme. The originality of this section comes from the direct omission of the first theme and the usage of the second theme in an almost unrecognisable way. After that is a coda-like theme with much dynamic fluctuation. At the last page comes a loud and march-like theme in A minor, then proceeding with arpeggios and chords in the tonic second inversion chord. Then comes with a very quiet C major arpeggio marked pp subito then comes with a loud ending theme that ends the piece. The piece ends with A minor chord in ff.
