= Symphony-Concerto (Prokofiev) =

1952 piece of music by Sergey Prokofiev

Sergei Prokofiev's Symphony-Concerto in E minor, Op. 125 (also widely referred to as Sinfonia Concertante) is a large-scale work for cello and orchestra.

The Symphony-Concerto was premiered on 18 February 1952 by Mstislav Rostropovich, to whom the work was dedicated. It was originally presented as Prokofiev's Second Cello Concerto, but Prokofiev subsequently revised and changed its title. It is among Prokofiev's final completed works.

== History ==
Prokofiev began work on what would become the Symphony-Concerto after completing his Cello Sonata in 1949. The work was commissioned by Aleksandr Kholodilin, the head of the music division of the Committee on Artistic Affairs, with the completion date specified as 1 November 1951.

The work drew, in part, on material contained in Prokofiev's earlier Cello Concerto, which was premiered in 1938. Drafts of the new work were provided to Rostropovich for technical correction and refinement.

The work was first performed, as Prokofiev's Second Cello Concerto, on 18 February 1952 in Moscow, with Rostropovich as soloist and Sviatoslav Richter as conductor. Following a review by the Union of Soviet Composers, the concerto was further revised and retitled as the "Симфония-концерт" (commonly rendered in English as "Symphony-Concerto"). Prokofiev died before the final version was performed: the first performance of that version took place on 9 December 1954 with Rostropovich as soloist, accompanied by the Danish State Radio Symphony Orchestra under the direction of Thomas Jensen.

The Symphony-Concerto was one of several compositions for cello on which Prokofiev worked from the late 1940s until his death. In addition to the Cello Sonata, Prokofiev also commenced work on two unfinished works: a sonata for unaccompanied cello (for which he wrote 14 pages of sketches), and a Cello Concertino (later completed by Rostropovich).

== Music ==
The work is scored for two flutes (second doubling piccolo), two oboes, two clarinets, two bassoons, four horns, two trumpets, three trombones, tuba, percussion (timpani, cymbals, tambourine, triangle, bass drum, and snare drum), celesta, and strings.

It has a typical performance duration of about 40 minutes and consists of three movements with the following tempo markings:

1. Andante
2. Allegro giusto
3. Andante con moto – Allegretto – Allegro marcato

The piece is noted for its extreme difficulty due to the length of the concerto, runs, and high positions among many other technical difficulties. The end of the concerto requires the cellist to play off the fingerboard, reaching as high as an E7, the extreme upper limit of the cello's range.
