= Four Pieces =

Four Pieces may refer to:

== Musical compositions ==
- Four Pieces for Piano (disambiguation)
- Four Pieces for String Quartet (Mendelssohn), pieces for string quartet by Felix Mendelssohn published posthumously
- Four Pieces, Op. 115 (Sibelius), 1929 pieces for violin and piano by Jean Sibelius
- Four Orchestral Pieces (Bruckner), 1862 orchestral pieces by Anton Bruckner

== Others ==
- Four Pieces (album), 2018 box set by Yazoo
