= Op. 137 =

In music, Op. 137 stands for Opus number 137. Compositions that are assigned this number include:

- Beethoven – Fugue for String Quintet, Op. 137
- Prokofiev – Piano Sonata No. 10
- Schumann – Jagdlieder (5 partsongs for men's voices with 4 horns ad lib)
