= Op. 134 =

In music, Op. 134 stands for Opus number 134. Compositions that are assigned this number include:

- Prokofiev – Sonata for Solo Cello
- Schumann – Introduction and Concert Allegro
- Shostakovich – Violin Sonata
