= Symphonic Song =

Symphonic Song or Symphonic Songs may refer to:

- Symphonic Song (Prokofiev), composition for orchestra by Sergei Prokofiev
- Symphonic Songs for Band, composition for wind band by Robert Russell Bennett

== See also ==
- Orchestral song
