= Four Pieces for Piano =

Four Pieces for Piano may refer to:

- Four Pieces for Piano, Op. 119 (Brahms)
- Four Pieces for Piano, Op. 4 (Prokofiev)
- Four Pieces for Piano, Op. 32 (Prokofiev)

== See also ==
- Four Pieces (disambiguation)
