= Piano Sonata in F minor =

Piano Sonata in F minor may refer to:

- Piano Sonata No. 1 (Beethoven)
- Piano Sonata No. 23 (Beethoven)
- Piano Sonata in F minor, WoO 47 No. 2 (Beethoven)
- Piano Sonata No. 3 (Brahms)
- Piano Sonata No. 1 (Prokofiev)
- Piano Sonata in F minor, D 625 (Schubert)
- Piano Sonata No. 3 (Schumann)
- Piano Sonata No. 1 (Scriabin)
