= Op. 76 =

In music, Op. 76 stands for Opus number 76. Compositions that are assigned this number include:

- Alkan – Trois grandes études
- Dvořák – Symphony No. 5
- Elgar – Polonia
- Haydn – String Quartets, Op. 76
- Prokofiev – Songs of Our Days
- Schumann – Four Marches (Vier Märsche) for piano
- Stanford – Much Ado About Nothing
- Strauss – Die Tageszeiten
