= Op. 57 =

In music, Op. 57 stands for Opus number 57. Compositions that are assigned this number include:

- Beethoven – Piano Sonata No. 23
- Chopin – Berceuse
- Dvořák – Violin Sonata
- Fauré – Shylock
- Glazunov – Raymonda
- Medtner – Violin Sonata No. 3
- Nielsen – Clarinet Concerto
- Prokofiev – Symphonic Song
- Reicha – L'art de varier
- Schumann – Belsatzar, ballad (Heine)
- Shostakovich – Piano Quintet
