= Quintet (Prokofiev) =

Chamber work by Sergei Prokofiev

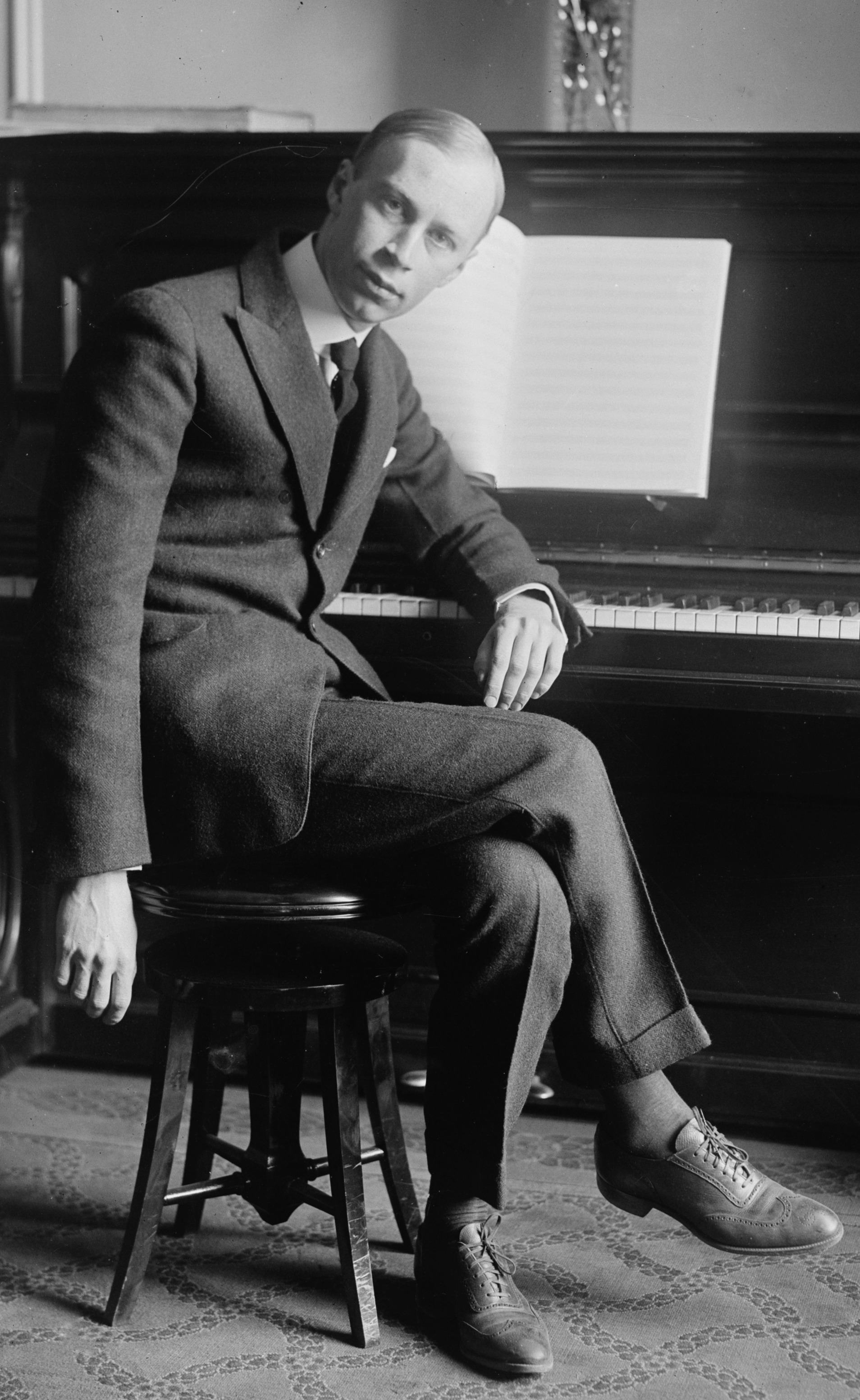
Sergei Prokofiev c. 1918

Sergei Prokofiev's Quintet in G minor, Op. 39 is a piece of chamber music for oboe, clarinet, violin, viola and double bass, written in 1924. The quintet, closely related to Prokofiev's ballet, Trapèze, contains six movements and lasts 20–25 minutes.

== Background ==
In 1924, when Prokofiev was staying in Paris, a travelling troupe commissioned a chamber ballet from him. However, the ensemble that provided music accompaniment to the troupe only contained five members. This provided Prokofiev an opportunity to write more chamber music. His most recent chamber piece had been the Overture on Hebrew Themes, Op. 34 (1919).

Later, Prokofiev incorporated the ballet music into two pieces: Quintet, Op. 39 (1924) and Divertissement Op. 43 (1925–29).

== Movements ==
The quintet has six movements:

1. Tema con variazioni
2. Andante energico
3. Allegro sostenuto, ma con brio
4. Adagio pesante
5. Allegro precipitato, ma non troppo presto
6. Andantino

The related ballet, Trapèze, reconstructed in 2002, is in five movements:

1. Overture
  1. Moderato, molto ritmato
2. "Matelote"
  1. Allegro
3. "The Ballerina"
  1. Tema con variazioni
  2. Andante energico
4. "Dance of the Tumblers"
  1. Allegro sostenuto, ma con brio
  2. Adagio pesante
  3. Allegro precipitato, ma non troppo presto
5. "Mourning the Ballerina"
  1. Andantino

== Companion pieces ==
- Nicholas Urie, Quintet, 2017, Commissioned by the Boston Symphony Orchestra. Nicholas Urie, Quintet.

== See also ==
- Prokofiev – Chamber Music
- Prokofiev – List of Compositions
