= String Quartet No. 1 (Prokofiev) =

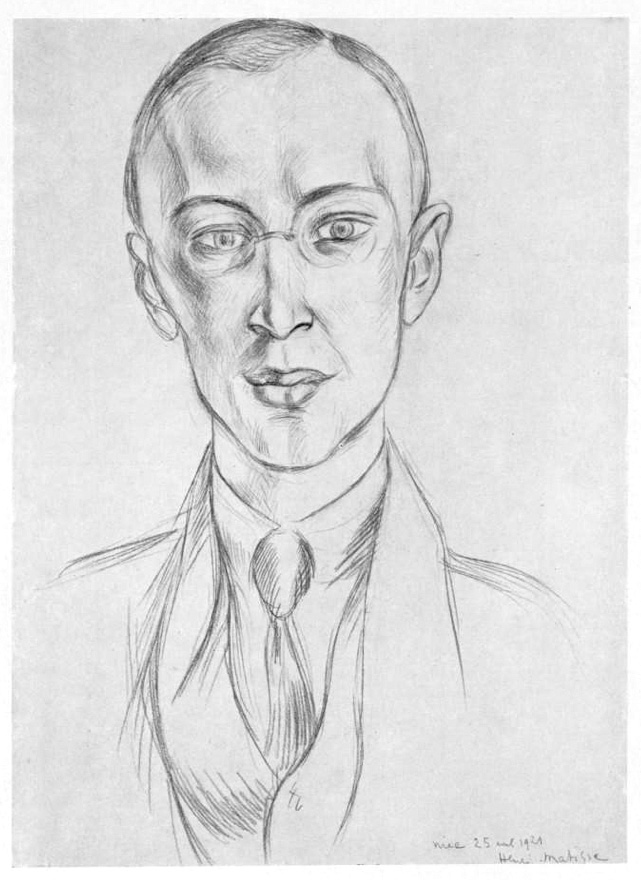
Prokofiev, as drawn by Henri Matisse for the premiere of Chout (1921)

Sergei Prokofiev's String Quartet No. 1 in B minor, Op. 50 (1931) was commissioned by the Library of Congress. The Quartet was first performed in Washington, D.C., on 25 April 1931 by the Brosa Quartet and in Moscow on 9 October 1931 by the Roth Quartet. The string quartet is in three movements, lasting around 20–25 minutes.

== Movements ==
The string quartet has three movements:

1. Allegro
2. Andante molto
3. Andante

== Analysis ==
The work is distinctive in that its key, B minor, is just a semitone below the limits of the viola and cello range. Another distinctive feature is that the finale is a slow movement, which is highly intense in emotion and full of sweeping melodies.

Prokofiev had liked the finale so much that he transcribed a version of it for string orchestra, as Op. 50a, and included a piano transcription in his pieces as Op. 52.

== See also ==
- Prokofiev - String Quartet No. 2 in F major
- Prokofiev - Chamber Music
- Prokofiev - List of Compositions
