= The Year 1941 (Prokofiev) =

Symphonic suite by Sergei Prokofiev

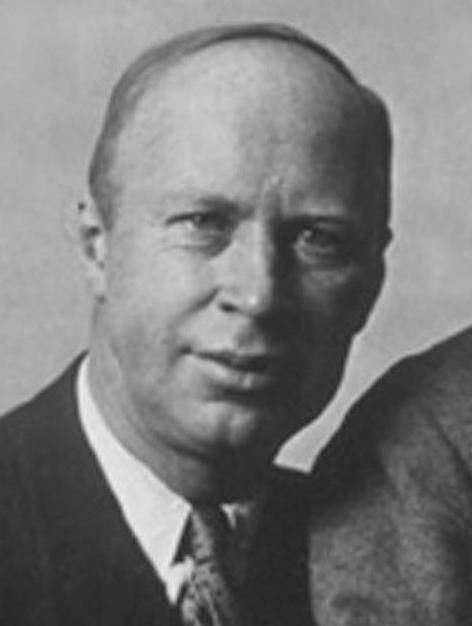
Sergei Prokofiev in 1936

Sergei Prokofiev wrote the symphonic suite The Year 1941 (Op. 90) in 1941. Prokofiev, along with other composers, was evacuated to the Caucasus when Germany started attacking the Soviet Union in 1941. It was under such circumstances that Prokofiev began work on this symphonic suite. He was working on his epic opera War and Peace and the String Quartet No. 2 at the same time.

== Music ==
The suite is scored for 2 flutes, piccolo, 2 oboes, cor anglais, 2 clarinets, bass clarinet, 2 bassoons, contrabassoon, 4 horns, 2 trumpets, 2 trombones, tuba, percussion (timpani, bass drum, triangle, wood block, side drum, tambourine, and cymbals), harp, and strings.

The whole suite lasts for around 15 minutes.

1. In the Struggle – The composer described this as "a scene of heated battle, heard by the audience sometimes as though far away and sometimes as though on the actual battlefield."
2. In the Night – "a poetic night scene disturbed by the tension of impending conflict."
3. For the Brotherhood of Man – "a triumphant lyrical hymn to victory and the brotherhood of peoples."

== Criticism ==
Dmitri Shostakovich criticized the work's weak movements, lack of development and thought that the materials were under-developed and not thought through. Even Nikolai Myaskovsky, Prokofiev's closest friend, did not like the work. The suite has been described as evoking cold, abstract and inexpressive images in an attempt to oversimplify for greater clarity and comprehensibility. However, the work does contain a wealth of melodic material and Prokofiev later used some of the ideas and motives for the film score to Igor Savchenko’s depiction of the events of the Great Patriotic War, Partisans in the Ukrainian Steppes (1942, film released 1943).

In 1948, Party officials, namely Tikhon Khrennikov, deemed the music unworthy of truly depicting the momentous events of the Great Patriotic War, and the Central Committee criticized it for its “anti-democratic, formalist tendency.” Sovetskaya Muzyka (Soviet Music magazine) also noted that “the music of the Suite, while at times very poetic, does not penetrate to the core of the events which are indissolubly associated, in our minds, with the tragic year of 1941.” The Year 1941 remained unpublished and was subsequently barred from performance.

== Premiere ==
The suite was first performed on January 21, 1943, in Sverdlovsk (now named Yekaterinburg).

== Recordings ==
- Exton CD OVCL-00323 St. Petersburg Philharmonic Orchestra, Leonid Repin (tenor), Vladimir Ashkenazy (conductor).
- Naxos CD 8.55056 National Symphony Orchestra of Ukraine, Theodore Kuchar (conductor).
- Russian Revelation CD State Symphony Orchestra of the Ministry of Culture, Gennady Rozhdestvensky (conductor).
- Naxos CD 8.573029 São Paulo Symphony Orchestra, Marin Alsop (conductor).
