= Russian Overture =

Orchestral work by Sergei Prokofiev

- Overture by Sergei Prokofiev
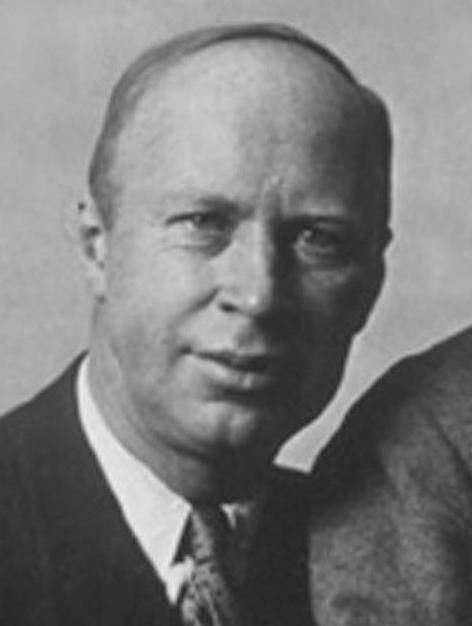
- Sergei Prokofiev in 1936
- Opus: 72
- Composed: 1936
- Performed: 1936
- Scoring: large orchestra

Russian Overture, Op. 72, (Russian: Русская увертюра, romanized: Russkaya yvertyura, IPA: [rˈuskəjə ʊvʲɪrtʲˈʉrə]) is an overture composed in 1936 by Sergei Prokofiev.

In 1936, Prokofiev returned permanently to the USSR. He showed sketches of the overture to Eugen Szenkar, who accepted it for his orchestra. Prokofiev used a large orchestra, as he had previously in the Scythian Suite and Seven, They are Seven. The overture was completed on 25 September 1936 and premiered on 29 October in the Great Hall of the Moscow Conservatory by Moscow State Philharmonic Orchestra under the direction of Szenkar, who subsequently performed it in Paris and elsewhere in Europe.

After the premiere, Prokofiev reorchestrated the piece on the advice of Szenkar, reducing the number of brass, woodwind and percussion players. On 15 October 1937, it was given its American premiere by the Boston Symphony Orchestra under Serge Koussevitzky.

According to Prokofiev's biographer, Simon Morrison, the overture "includes motives derived from Russian folkdance, salon song and liturgical chant."
