= Four Pieces for Piano, Op. 32 (Prokofiev) =

Four Pieces for Piano
- by Sergei Prokofiev
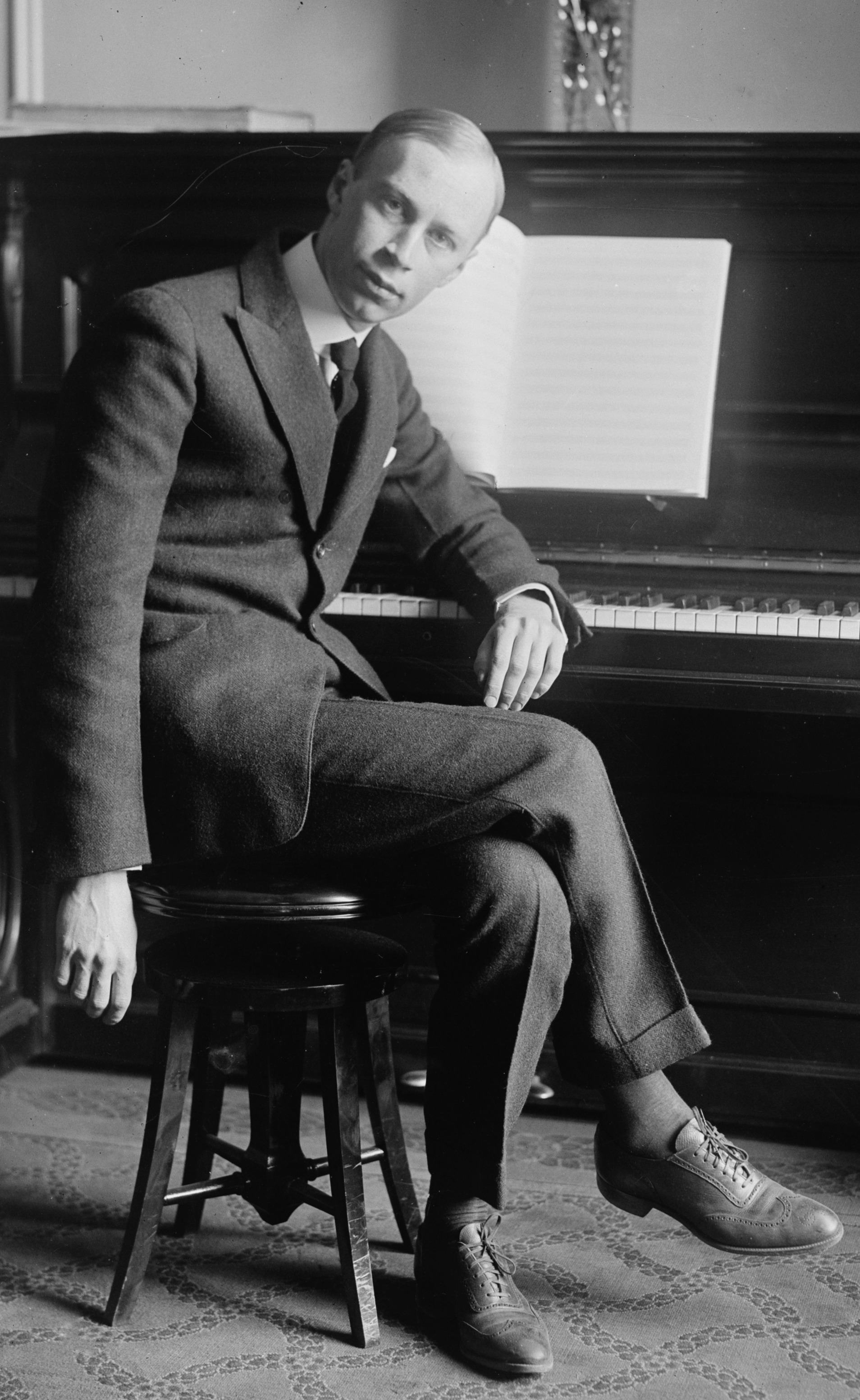
- Sergei Prokofiev c. 1918
- Opus: 32
- Year: 1918
- Performed: 1919 - New York
- Published: 1922 - Moscow
- Publisher: A. Gutheil
- Duration: 10 minutes approx.
- Movements: 4
- Scoring: Piano

Four Pieces for Piano, Op. 32 (Russian: Четыре пьесы для Фортепиано), is a set of short solo piano pieces written by Russian composer Sergei Prokofiev. Written in 1918, it is part of a lengthy series of collections of short pieces for piano.

== Background ==
The set was written during Prokofiev's stay in the United States, largely to the composer would earn some money while he was waiting for the delayed premiere of The Love for Three Oranges. It was in this period that Prokofiev also wrote Tales of an Old Grandmother, Op. 31, as he needed quick and easily sold pieces that would provide steady income. His publisher, Carl Fischer, was happy with his Op. 31 and asked him to write more pieces for piano. Prokofiev approached the dances in the set with disdain, and frequently complained about how boring they were in letters, saying: "I would much prefer to be working on [the] opera", "I would not be writing any of this rubbish if I did not need the money," and "There’s nothing good in any of these dances". They were all composed between October 9 and 18, 1918, while he was battling a minor flu. On the day they were finished, he wrote: "They are a little boring. I have no particular preference for one over another". The dances were eventually not published by Fischer, but by A. Gutheil, Koussevitzky's Russian Music Editions, in Moscow in 1922. The set premiered in New York City on March 30, 1919, with Prokofiev at the piano.

Despite how dismissive Prokofiev initially was about the pieces, they ended up gaining popularity over time. Prokofiev himself performed the gavotte for recording at the His Master's Voice studios in Paris on March 4, 1935, and violinist Jascha Heifetz even wrote an arrangement of the same gavotte for violin and piano and turned it into a short showpiece for duet.

== Structure ==
This set is composed by four short pieces, scored for piano, with a total duration of around 10 minutes. The titles and the type of pieces in the set evoke those of Baroque suites. The movement list is as follows:

1. Танец (Dance). Allegretto
2. Менуэт (Menuet). Allegro moderato
3. Гавот (Gavotte). Allegro non troppo
4. Вальс (Waltz). Lento espressivo
