= Vladimir Blok =

Russian composer

Blok Vladimir Mikhailovich
- Блок Владимир Мхайлович
- Born: November 7, 1932; Moscow
- Died: August 28, 1996 (aged 63); Moscow
- Occupation(s): Musicologist, composer and orchestrator

Vladimir Mikhailovich Blok (Russian: Влади́мир Миха́йлович Блок, 7 November 1932, Moscow – 28 August 1996, Moscow) was a Russian musicologist, composer and orchestrator of the works of Prokofiev, of Udmurt ethnicity.

V.M. Blok is to be distinguished from the Russian theatre critic Vladimir Borisovich Blok (b. 22 June 1918)

== Completions ==
- completion of the Prokofiev Andante for solo cello.
- orchestration of the Prokofiev Concertino, commissioned by Steven Isserlis

== Publications ==
- Prokofiev's works for cello - Виолончельное творчество Прокофьева. Muzika, 1973.
- Sergei Prokofiev: materials articles interviews (Russian edition: Сергей Прокофьев: материалы, статьи, интервью). Moscow: Progress Publishers, 1978.

== Own compositions ==
- Quartet, rec. Barcelona Quartet 2004

== See also ==
entry in Udmurt Wikipedia
