= Pyotr Suvchinsky =

Russian patron of the arts and writer

Pyotr Petrovich Suvchinsky (Polish: Piotr Suwczyński, Russian: Пётр Петро́вич Сувчи́нский), later known as Pierre Souvtchinsky (October 5, 1892, St-Petersburg – January 24, 1985, Paris), was a Russian artistic patron and writer on music. The heir to a sugar fortune, he took piano lessons from Felix Blumenfeld and initially hoped to become an operatic tenor. He was the patron and co-publisher of the Saint Petersburg musical journal Muzikalniy sovremennik founded in 1915. He was a friend of Nikolai Myaskovsky, Sergei Prokofiev and Igor Stravinsky, and was the real author of the book La poétique musicale, published as by Stravinsky. (Prokofiev dedicated his Piano Sonata No. 5 to Suvchinsky.) Suvchinsky emigrated from Russia in 1922 and lived in Berlin and Sofia, where he founded the Russian-Bulgarian Publishing House; then in Paris, where he remained for the rest of his life. He was still active in musical circles and a champion of the music of Olivier Messiaen and Pierre Boulez in the post-war period; he was a co-founder, with Boulez and Jean-Louis Barrault, of the Domaine musical concert series.
