= Sinfonietta (Prokofiev) =

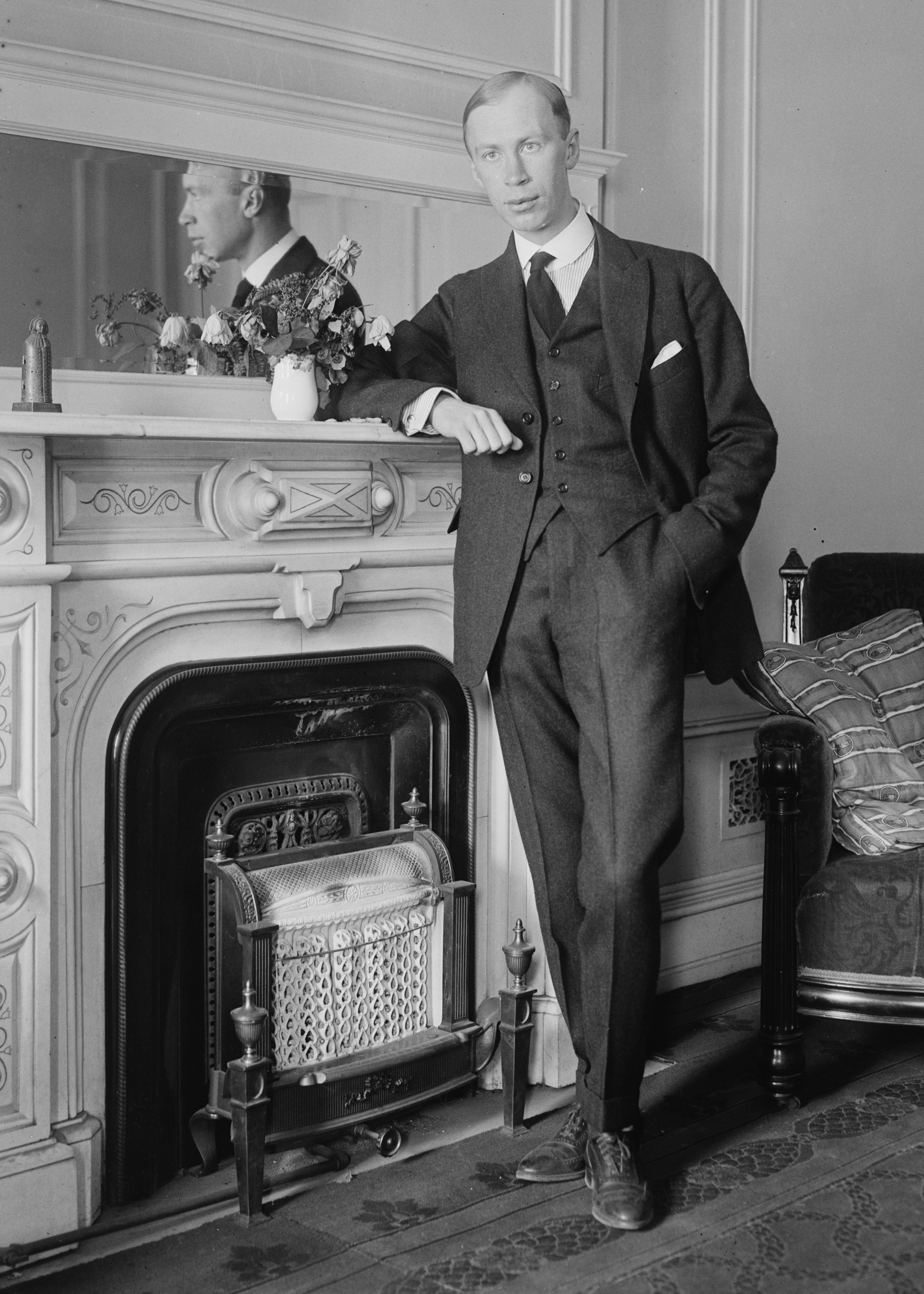
Sergei Prokofiev, c. 1918

The Sinfonietta in A major, Op. 5, is a composition for orchestra by Sergei Prokofiev. The Sinfonietta is rather similar to the better-known Classical Symphony, being light in character, while infusing Prokofiev's typical twists of harmony. However, it is rarely performed.

Sergei Prokofiev wrote his Sinfonietta in A major in 1909 and dedicated it to Nikolai Tcherepnin, his conducting professor at the St. Petersburg Conservatory. Prokofiev subsequently modified it twice, once in 1914 and finally in 1929, publishing the final revision as Op. 5/48. The premiere of the final revision was under Konstantin Saradzhev on 18 November 1930.

== Music ==
The Sinfonietta is scored for two flutes, two oboes, two clarinets, two bassoons, four horns, two trumpets, and strings.

The piece is in five movements, lasting around 25 minutes:

1. Allegro giocoso
2. Andante
3. Intermezzo: Vivace
4. Scherzo: Allegro risoluto
5. Allegro giocoso

== Recordings ==
Orchestra	Conductor	Record Company	Year of Recording	Format
Vienna Symphony Orchestra	Henry Swoboda	Westminster WL 50–31	1950	12-in. LP
Moscow Radio Symphony Orchestra	Dzhemal Daigat	Melodiya	1972	LP
Philharmonia Orchestra	Riccardo Muti	His Master's Voice	1978	LP
Scottish National Orchestra	Neeme Järvi	Chandos	1986	CD
Lausanne Chamber Orchestra	Alberto Zedda	Virgin Classics	1989	CD
Chicago Chamber Orchestra	Dieter Kober	Centaur Records	1995	CD
Bournemouth Symphony Orchestra	Kirill Karabits	Onyx Records	2014	CD
