= Piano Concerto No. 6 (Prokofiev) =

Unfinished piano concerto by Sergei Prokofiev

Sergei Prokofiev did not manage to compose more than a few bars of his Piano Concerto No. 6 (Op. 134, sometimes Op. 133) before his death in 1953, so it is impossible to reconstruct the underlying musical ideas and complete it.

The work is unusual in that it is scored for two pianos and a string orchestra. The other five of Prokofiev's piano concertos are written for solo piano (one for left hand alone) and more or less standard orchestration.

Ron Weidberg's "Concerto for Two Pianos and String Orchestra after Drafts by S. Prokofiev", written in 2005-07 was the first attempt to complete the work by means of orchestrating the drafts, filling the gaps between the existing sketches and continuing the original ideas through the work's conclusion. The Concerto was commissioned by the Silver–Garburg Piano Duo. The completed three movement work was premiered on 2012 in Tel Aviv and Jerusalem by the Silver-Garburg Piano Duo and the Tel Aviv Soloists Orchestra conducted by Barak Tal.

In 2014, Norbert Palej (then assistant professor of composition at the University of Toronto) completed a version of the concerto with the assistance of Prokofiev's grandson Gabriel Prokofiev. It was premiered on 27 February 2016 at the Louisiana State University School of Music at the Symposium on Prokofiev and the Russian Tradition. Pianists Michael Gurt and Gregory Sioles served as the soloists. This version was noted for its extensive and at times erratic use of the marimba and cymbals.
