= The Queen of Spades (Prokofiev) =

Film score composed by Sergei Prokofiev

- by Sergei Prokofiev
- Opus: 70
- Composed: 1936
- Movements: 24

The Queen of Spades (Russian: Пиковая Дама, Pikovaya Dama), Op. 70, is the score composed by Sergei Prokofiev in 1936 for the planned but unrealized film by Mikhail Romm. The film was to be based on the 1834 short story "The Queen of Spades" by Alexander Pushkin, and was intended for release in 1937, the centenary of Pushkin's death. It is one of Prokofiev's least known pieces.

== Background ==
The Queen of Spades was originally intended to be released on the centenary of Pushkin's death. However, the film was never finished, due to the tightening censorship in the USSR. Having signed a contract dated 29 May 1936, Prokofiev finished the piano score by 12 July, before sending it to his assistant, Pavel Lamm. When Prokofiev first played the piano reduction for Romm, Romm noted that it was neither lyrical nor dramatic, but "three and then seven pitches repeated endlessly," which added to the films "aridity," as well as conveying a sense of obsession and schizophrenia.

The 14-page piano reduction manuscript is preserved at the Russian State Archive of Literature and Art, in Moscow.

Prokofiev reused music from The Queen of Spades in the third movement of his fifth symphony, as well as in his Piano Sonata No. 8. Additional reworkings of the score have been composed by Gennady Rozhdestvensky and Michael Berkeley.

== Structure ==
The typical performance duration is approximately 43 minutes.

=== Instrumentation ===
The Queen of Spades is scored for two flutes, two oboes, English horn, two clarinets, bass clarinet, two bassoons, four horns, three trumpets, three trombones, tuba, timpani, bass drum, snare drum, cymbals, piano, and strings.

=== Movements ===
1. Overture
2. Wandering About
3. Herman in Front of the Countess's House
4. Liza
5. Herman at Home
6. Morning
7. Herman Spots Liza
8. Herman Delivers a Letter to Liza
9. Liza Reads the Letter
10. Liza Daydreams and Writes an Answer
11. Liza Goes Out with a Letter to Herman
12. Herman Reads the Letter; Herman in Front of the Countess's House
13. Herman in Liza's Room
14. The Ball
15. Liza in Her Room
16. Herman with Playing Cards
17. Visiting the Countess
18. Herman Takes Notes, Puts them into His Pocket, Enters the Gambling Parlour (Note: In the margin above the first piano score, Prokofiev wrote: "If the excerpt is too long, a cut can be made in the middle, at measures 17-24, for example.")
19. First Winnings
20. Herman Enters the Gambling Parlour for the Second Time (Note: Prokofiev wrote: "I think the music should end when Herman takes the glass of lemonade—or earlier—so that there will be a sufficient break before his next appearance.")
21. Second Winnings
22. Herman Enters the Gambling Parlour for the Third Time
23. Herman Has Lost
24. Last Rendezvous
