= Divertissement (Prokofiev) =

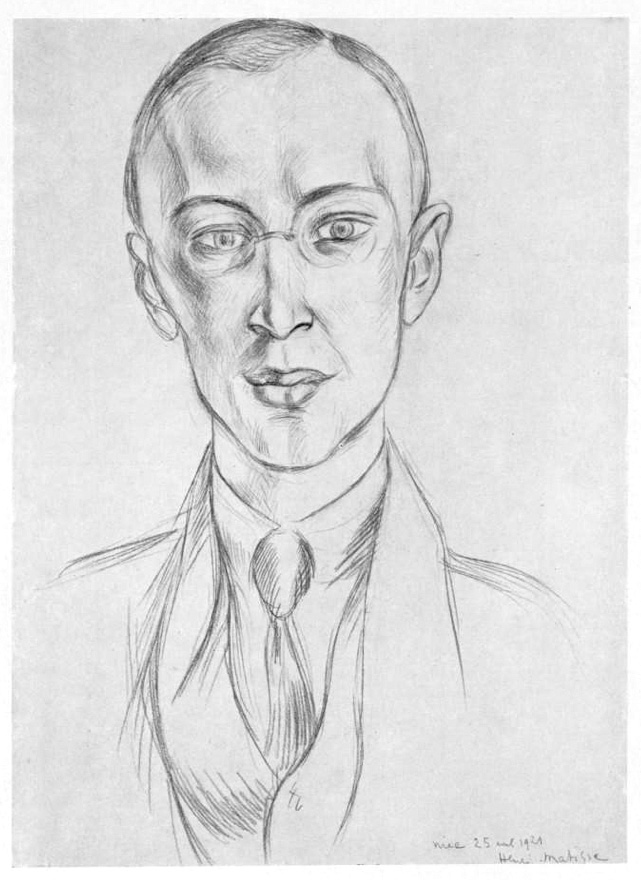
Prokofiev, as drawn by Henri Matisse for the premiere of Chout (1921)

Sergei Prokofiev composed his Divertissement Op.43 for small orchestra. The work is closely related to his ballet, Trapèze. He also made a piano transcription of the work with subtitles for each movement.

== Background ==
Prokofiev wrote a ballet Trapèze on a theme of circus for the touring company Boris Romanov. Trapèze was written for quintet to suit the small instrumental section of the company. In 1929, he adapted movements from the ballet as the first and third movements, combining them with the second movement which he had sketched the previous year and the finale originally composed for another ballet Prodigal Son, to form a complete divertimento. Much of the score for Trapèze was adapted in his Quintet Op. 39.

He transcribed Divertissement for piano solo, which was a fairly literal adaption of the orchestral version. He supplied subtitles for movements of divertimento for piano whereas the orchestral version used only tempo markings.

== Structure ==
The divertimento consists of four movements, which last for about 15 minutes to perform. Subtitles of movements for the piano transcription are shown with quotation marks.

1. Moderato, molto ritmato, "Divertissement"
2. Larghetto (non troppo lento), "Nocturne"
3. Allegro energico, "Danse"
4. Allegro non troppo e pesante, "Epilogue"

The subject in the first movement reappears in the finale.
