= Flourish, Mighty Land (Prokofiev) =

1947 cantata by Sergei Prokofiev

Flourish, Mighty Land, Op. 114, (variably called Flourish, Mighty Homeland or Prosper, Mighty Country) is a cantata written by Sergei Prokofiev in 1947, to commemorate the 30th anniversary of the October Revolution, along with his Thirty Years.

== Background ==
In contrast to the monumental Cantata for the 20th Anniversary of the October Revolution, this cantata, in one movement, lasts 8 minutes. It is scored for chorus and orchestra.

== Analysis ==
The cantata opens with a trumpet theme in D♭ major, which is subsequently treated to Prokofiev's typical harmonic modulations. After a repeat of the theme by muted trumpet and piccolo, strings and woodwinds develop it.

The chorus then introduce a glowing theme a cappella, which alternates with pure orchestral sections. The climax is reached half-way, when the chorus and the orchestra perform together.

The chorus repeats the a cappella sections again, this time interrupted by marching orchestral chords. The chorus then fades out, and the opening trumpet theme returns. The cantata ends with three notes in descending tritones (high D♭, G, low D♭).

== Instrumentation ==
Piccolo
2 Flutes
2 Oboes
English Horn
2 Clarinets
Bass Clarinet
2 Bassoons
Contrabassoon
4 Horns
3 Trumpets
3 Trombones
Tuba
Timpani
Percussion (Triangle, Tambourine, Castanets, Snare Drum, Cymbals, Bass Drum)
Harp
Piano
Strings (1st and 2nd Violins, Violas, Cellos, Double Basses)

Chorus

== Premiere ==
12 November 1947, Moscow: Nikolai Anosov (conductor), USSR State Symphony Orchestra, Russian Federal SSR Choir.

== Recordings ==
Orchestra	Choir	Conductor	Record Company	Year of Recording	Format
State Symphony Capella of Russia	State Symphony Capella of Russia	Valeri Polyansky	Chandos Records	2003	CD
New Philharmonic Orchestra	St Petersburg Philharmonic Choir	Alexander Titov	Beaux	1998	CD
USSR Ministry of Culture State Symphony Orchestra	USSR Ministry of Culture Chamber Choir	Gennadi Rozhdestvensky	Melodiya	?	LP
