= Sarcasms (Prokofiev) =

Composition for piano by Sergei Prokofiev

- Composition for piano by Sergei Prokofiev
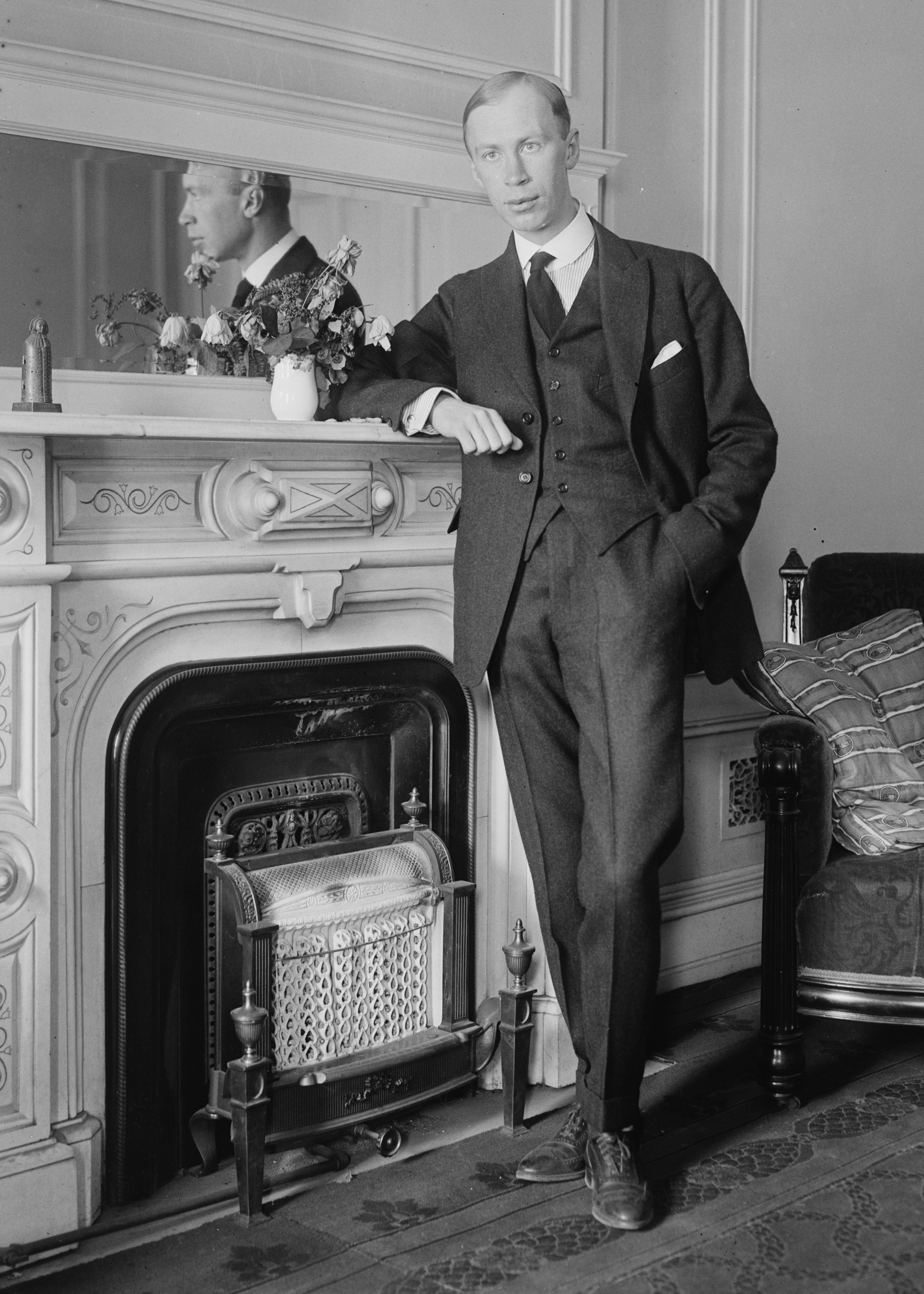
- Sergei Prokofiev, c. 1918
- Composed: 1912–14
- Performed: November 27, 1916
- Published: 1916
- Publisher: P. Jurgenson
- Duration: 12 minutes
- Movements: Five
- Scoring: Solo piano

Premiere
- Date: November 27, 1916
- Location: Petrograd
- Performers: Sergei Prokofiev

Sarcasms, Op. 17 (Russian: Сарказмы, pronounced sarkazmy), initially alternatively entitled Sarcastic Pieces, is a 1914 solo piano composition by Russian composer Sergei Prokofiev.

== Background ==
The five-movement Sarcasms was written during the course of three years, between 1912 and 1914. It was initially entitled Sarcastic Pieces, but Prokofiev eventually decided to rename the title on the advice of two of his contemporaries: V. Nuvel and A. Nurok. All five movements were eventually laid out chronologically: movement I was written in 1912, movements II and III were written in 1913, and movements IV and V were written in 1914. The set of sarcasms were in his personal collection and he performed selections and fragments from the Sarcasms and other pieces on occasion. Prokofiev wrote a short program for the fifth piece in 1941, leaving all the other sarcasms without a program.

"We often indulge in malicious laughter at someone or something, but when we pause to look we see how pitiful and sad is the object of our ridicule; and then we grow ashamed, the mocking laughter rings in our ears, but it is we who are its object now."

— Sergei Prokofiev, Program of Sarcasms, Op. 17/5

The whole set was premiered by Prokofiev himself on November 27, 1916, in Saint Petersburg Conservatory, Petrograd. Pianist Heinrich Neuhaus recalled an anecdote from the premiere as follows: "Pince-nez placed on his nose, F.M. Blumenfeld cast his glance over Prokofiev’s head at the score. Sergei Sergeyevich was already prepared to begin, when he turned around suddenly and said: ‘Felix Mikhailovich! I’d rather you’d step to the side. I’m afraid you’ll hit me in the head with your fist.’ Everyone laughed. F.M. blew it off, but nevertheless stepped slightly to the side. Sergei Sergeyevich played through all the Sarcasms." Sarcasms was first published that same year in Moscow by P. Jurgenson.

== Structure ==
Scored for solo piano, Sarcasms consists of five untitled movements and has an approximate duration of 9½ to 12 minutes. The movement list is as follows:

1. Tempestoso
2. Allegro rubato
3. Allegro precipitato
4. Smanioso
5. Precipitosissimo — Andantino

Sarcasms is notable for Prokofiev's exploration of a new musical language. Some authors have referred to the use of "aggressive wrong notes" as a means to represent laughter in the sarcasms. All sarcasms have a loose two-theme structure, with theme A coming back at the end of each movement. As it is made more evident in movements I and III, the central theme is much more lyrical than the main theme presented at the beginning, which tends to be generally more percussive and pungent. One of the most notable movements is No. III, where polytonality plays a big role: the right hand plays in F♯ minor while the left hand plays a melody in B♭ minor.

== Reception ==
Sarcasms became very successful amongst modernists, primarily because of Prokofiev's efforts to find a new musical language, and was met with loud applause at the premiere in Petersburg. However, the composer himself felt the pieces "had just been written and were little understood at the time." Fellow composers Nikolai Medtner and Sergei Rachmaninoff were both taken aback in the premiere, especially for the extremes in dynamics and clashing chords used, which evoked the Suggestion diabolique (specifically movement III). Another fellow composer, Boris Asafyev stated that "Prokofiev's Sarcasms are more taunting, more trenchant than the verses of the early Mayakovsky, and the horror of them is more terrifying and powerful." Maxim Gorky also showed much interest in the Sarcasms. Lecturer David Nice also commented on the work that it begins "with something like a parody of The Rite of Spring's metrical freedom and pounding chords, which quickly fizzles out into Petrushka-like irresolution." Lecturer Richard P. Anderson also favourably stated that "even in the Sarcasms, Prokofiev's most grotesque caricatures where he consciously exploits the percussive extremes of the piano, his signature lyricism manages to creep in."
