= Cello Sonata (Prokofiev) =

Composition for cello and piano by Sergei Prokofiev

- by Sergei Prokofiev
- Key: C major
- Opus: 119
- Composed: 1949
- Performed: 1 March 1950: Moscow Conservatory
- Published: 1951
- Movements: 3

The Cello Sonata in C major, Op. 119, was composed by Sergei Prokofiev in 1949. The year before, Prokofiev was accused of formalism by the Zhdanov Decree and much of his music was banned. However, he continued to compose music, though he was not sure if his new works would ever be performed in public.

In 1949, Prokofiev attended a concert in which Mstislav Rostropovich performed Nikolai Miaskovsky's Cello Sonata No. 2 in A minor, Op. 81. Prokofiev was so impressed by Rostropovich's performance that he was determined to write a cello sonata for him. At the same time, Prokofiev wrote the symphonic suite Winter Bonfire, Op. 122, the ballet The Tale of the Stone Flower, Op. 118, and the Pushkin Waltzes, Op. 120. The Cello Sonata was published in Moscow in 1951.

== Structure ==
The sonata is structured in three movements:

1. Andante grave (C major)
2. Moderato (F major)
3. Allegro, ma non troppo (C major)

A typical performance lasts for about 25 minutes.

== Performance ==
The work was premiered on 1 March 1950, in the Small Hall of the Moscow Conservatory with Rostropovich and pianist Sviatoslav Richter. In his memoirs Richter wrote:

We gave the first performance of Prokofiev's Cello Sonata. Before playing it in concert, we had to perform it at the Composer's Union, where these gentlemen decided the fate of all new works. During this period more than any other, they needed to work out whether Prokofiev had produced a new masterpiece or, conversely, a piece that was 'hostile to the spirit of the people.' Three months later, we had to play it again at a plenary session of all the composers who sat on the Radio Committee, and it wasn't until the following year that we were able to perform it in public, in the Small Hall of the Moscow Conservatory on March 1, 1950.

In his diary Miaskovsky hailed the occasion: "Yesterday Rostropovich and Richter openly played the Cello Sonata by Prokofiev in concert - a miraculous piece of music!"
