= Piano Sonata No. 5 (Prokofiev) =

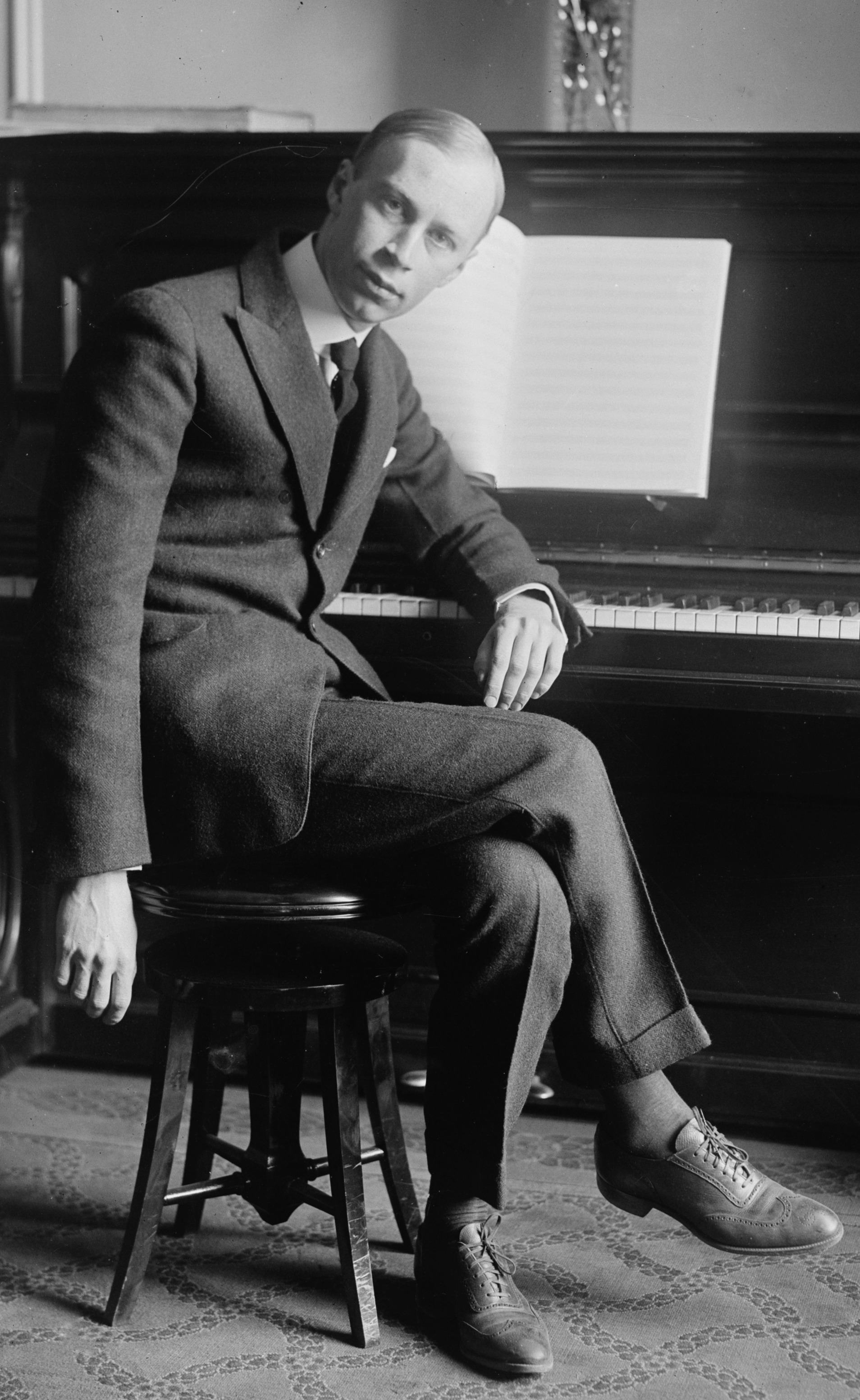
Sergei Prokofiev c. 1918

Sergei Prokofiev's Piano Sonata No. 5 in C major, Op. 38, was written at Ettal near Oberammergau in the Bavarian Alps during the composer's stay there in 1923. He would revise it thirty years later, at the end of his life, but not drastically, as his Opus 135, and it is this version that is usually played. The work is dedicated it to Pierre Souvtchinski, a musicologist and friend. All eight of Prokofiev's other piano sonatas were written in Russia. The revisions to this piece, made in 1952–53 in Russia, are mostly in the last movement.

== Movements ==
The piano sonata has three movements:

1. Allegro tranquillo
2. Andantino
3. Un poco allegretto
