= Toccata (Prokofiev) =

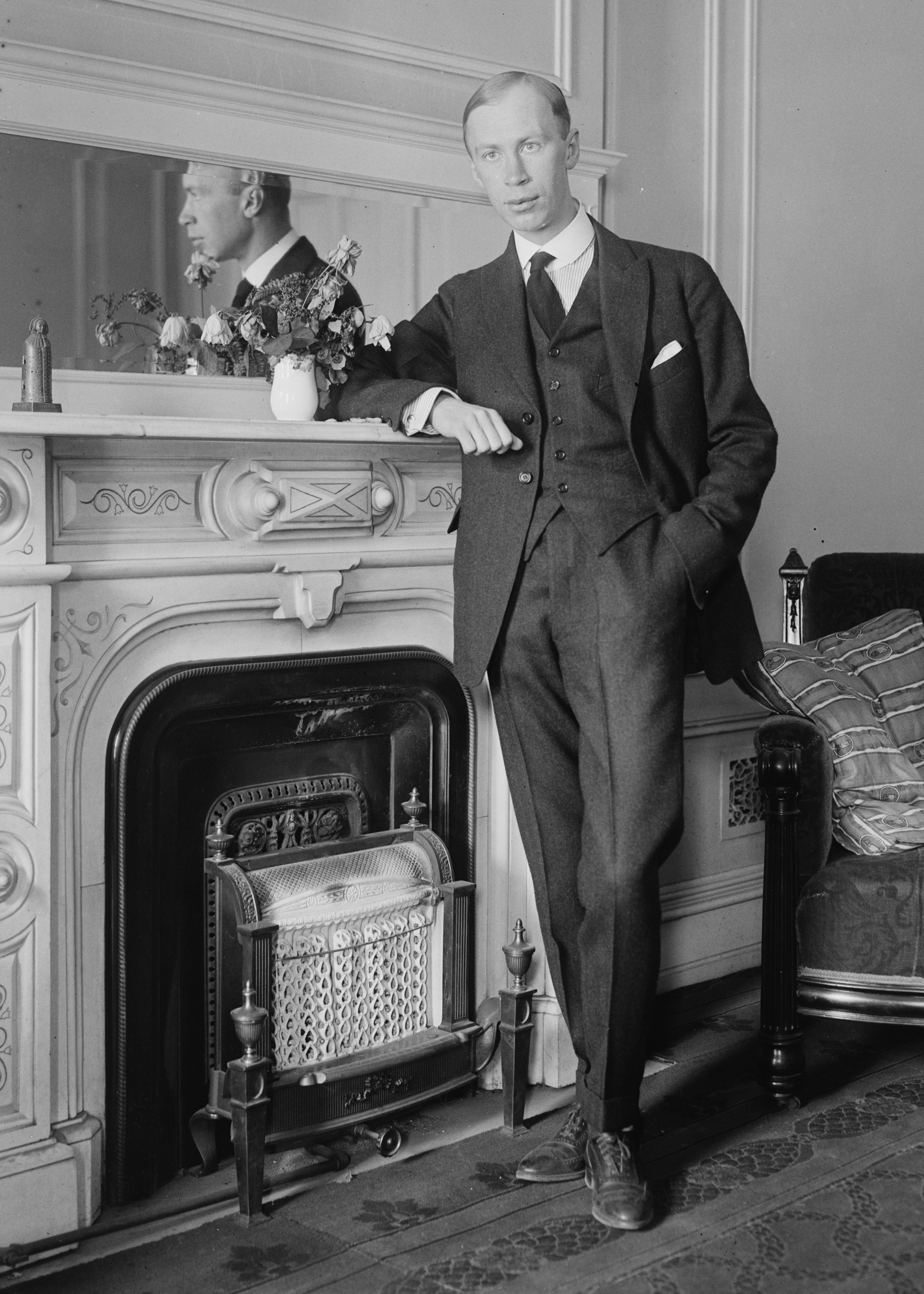
Sergei Prokofiev, c. 1918

The Toccata in D minor, Op. 11 is a piece for solo piano, written by Sergei Prokofiev in 1912 and debuted by the composer on December 10, 1916, in Petrograd. It is a further development of the toccata form, which has been used by composers such as Johann Sebastian Bach and Robert Schumann. Other composers of well-known toccatas include Maurice Ravel, Dmitri Kabalevsky and Aram Khachaturian.

== Music ==
Prokofiev's Toccata starts off with persistent repetition of the D, interchanged between the right hand (which plays one note at a time) and the left hand (which also plays the note an octave lower). After a brief development, the left hand alternates between two chromatic scale patterns, one ascending and one descending, between which a repeating figuration in the right hand outlines the D minor triad. These patterns repeat a fourth higher and continue in various iterations. A series of split chromatic thirds leads upwards to a descending melody (in C), with the left hand simultaneously traveling up the chromatic scale.

Prokofiev repeats and develops the chromatic-thirds theme before leading back to the initial repeated-note theme. After some augmentation and a short pause, both hands play the triad figuration, which now descends asynchronously in steps of a major third in each hand. This pattern underpins the right hand as it tackles leaps and later contrary-motion chromatic figures, while the left hand incorporates multiple of its own layers of chromatic movement. After a crescendo to fortissimo—during which the right hand outlines a C major triad while the left hand plays a four-note, black-key figure above it—the split chromatic thirds pattern reappears. This leads to several violent statements of the descending-thirds melody, this time in D, via chromatically ascending first-inversion minor triads in the right hand and descending chromatic octaves in the left hand.

The repetition of D comes back one more, this time in alternating octaves in both hands. Then the Toccata slows down and halts temporarily; when it resumes, the repeated notes transition into a rising chromatic scale, which leads to octave exhortations. A glissando sweep up the keyboard brings the piece to its conclusion—two sforzando D octaves at each end of the keyboard.

== Reception ==
The Toccata, an extremely difficult showpiece, has proven popular with virtuoso pianists, many of whom have recorded it. According to the biography of the composer by David Gutman, Prokofiev himself had trouble playing it because his technique, while good, was not quite enough to master the piece. This fact is not universally accepted, however, and his performance as reproduced in 1997 for the Nimbus Records series The Composer Plays is certainly virtuosic. Additionally, none of the leading biographies of Prokofiev—those written by Harlow Robinson, Victor Seroff, and even Israel Nestyev—mention him having any technical problems beyond poor performance techniques in childhood, which were later rectified through years of study after his graduation from the Saint Petersburg Conservatory. Among the notable recordings of the piece, interpretations by Idil Biret, Vladimir Horowitz and Emil Gilels can be heard.
