= String Quartet No. 2 (Prokofiev) =

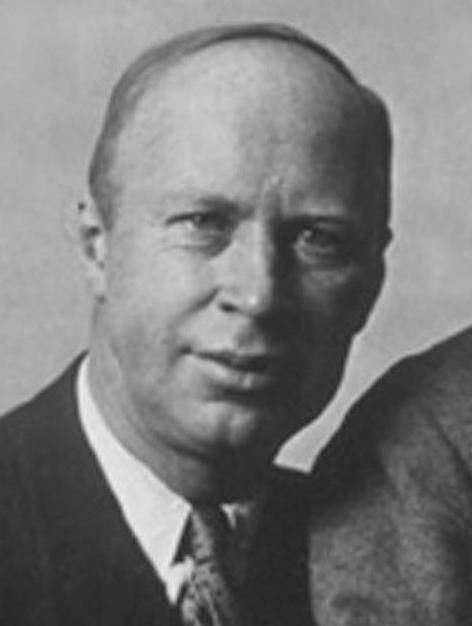
Sergei Prokofiev in 1936

Sergei Prokofiev's String Quartet No. 2 in F major, Op. 92 (1941) was first performed by the Beethoven Quartet in Moscow on 7 April 1942. A later concert in Moscow, on 5 September 1942, was delayed by a Nazi air raid and started late. Prokofiev thought it "an extremely turbulent success." The string quartet, lasting for 20–25 minutes, is in three movements.

== Background ==
Prokofiev, along with other Soviet artists, was evacuated from the major cities when the Nazis broke their non-aggression pact and invaded the Soviet Union in 1941. On August 8, 1941, Prokofiev traveled to Nalchik with other artists, among them his friend, musician Nikolai Myaskovsky, actors, such as Anton Chekhov's widow, and others. Prokofiev stayed in the town of Nalchik, the provincial capital of the Kabardino-Balkar Autonomous SSR, in the North Caucasus, about 900 miles south of Moscow (bordered by the European Russia, Turkey, and the Black and Caspian Seas). During this stay, Prokofiev was told by a government official to write a quartet using Kabardino-Balkar folk themes and wrote this string quartet, with themes based on folk tunes, rhythms and textures.

This quartet, along with the first, has entered the repertory of many string quartets.

== Movements ==
The work is in three movements:

1. Allegro sostenuto
2. Adagio
3. Allegro

== Analysis ==
Prokofiev utilized Kabardino-Balkar folk themes in his string quartet, while at the same retaining his unique style of harmonization. The folk music character is made evident by the string quartet's imitation of oriental plucked and percussion instruments, combined with resourceful use of sonic effects. The background accompaniment in the second movement attempts to imitate the playing of the kamancheh, a stringed instrument played by Caucasians.

Nikolai Myaskovsky, Prokofiev's close friend, wrote two works on Kabardino-Balkar themes, his 23rd symphony and 7th string quartet. The symphony shares a theme with the finale of Prokofiev's quartet.

== See also ==
- Prokofiev - String Quartet No. 1 in B minor
- Prokofiev - Chamber Music
- Prokofiev - List of Compositions
