= Trapèze (Prokofiev) =

Ballet by Sergei Prokofiev

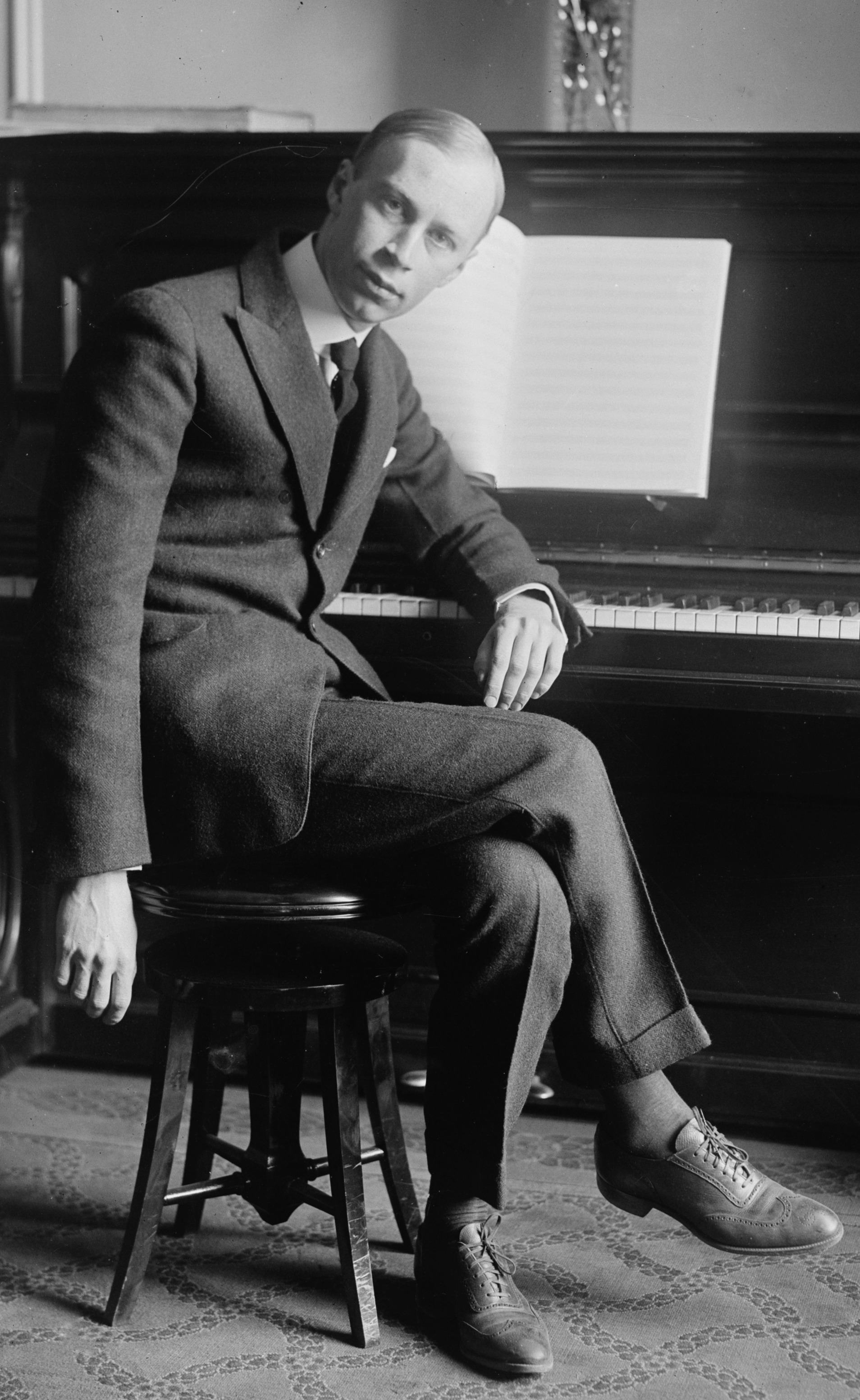
Sergei Prokofiev c. 1918

Trapèze (Russian: Трапе́ция) is a ballet by Sergei Prokofiev. Closely related to his Quintet, Op. 39 (1924), it contains eight movements (in five parts) and lasts 20–25 minutes. The complete ballet in eight movements was first performed in Gotha, a German town near Hanover, on 6 November 1925.

== Background ==
In 1924, when Prokofiev was staying in Paris, a travelling troupe commissioned a chamber ballet from him. However, the ensemble that provided music accompaniment to the troupe only contained five members. This provided Prokofiev an opportunity to write more chamber music. His most recent chamber piece had been the Overture on Hebrew Themes, Op. 34 (1919).

Later, Prokofiev incorporated the ballet music into two pieces: Quintet, Op. 39 (1924) and Divertissement, Op. 43 (1925–29).

== Movements ==
The Trapèze Ballet, reconstructed in 2002, is in five parts and eight movements:

1. Overture

1. Moderato, molto ritmato

2. "Matelote"

2. Allegro

3. "The Ballerina"

3. Tema con variazioni
4. Andante energico

4. "Dance of the Tumblers"

5. Allegro sostenuto, ma con brio
6. Adagio pesante
7. Allegro precipitato, ma non troppo presto

5. "Mourning the Ballerina"

8. Andantino

The related Quintet is in six movements as follows:

1. Tema con variazioni
2. Andante energico
3. Allegro sostenuto, ma con brio
4. Adagio pesante
5. Allegro precipitato, ma non troppo presto
6. Andantino

== See also ==
- List of ballets by title
