= Tales of an Old Grandmother =

1918 piano composition by Sergei Prokofiev

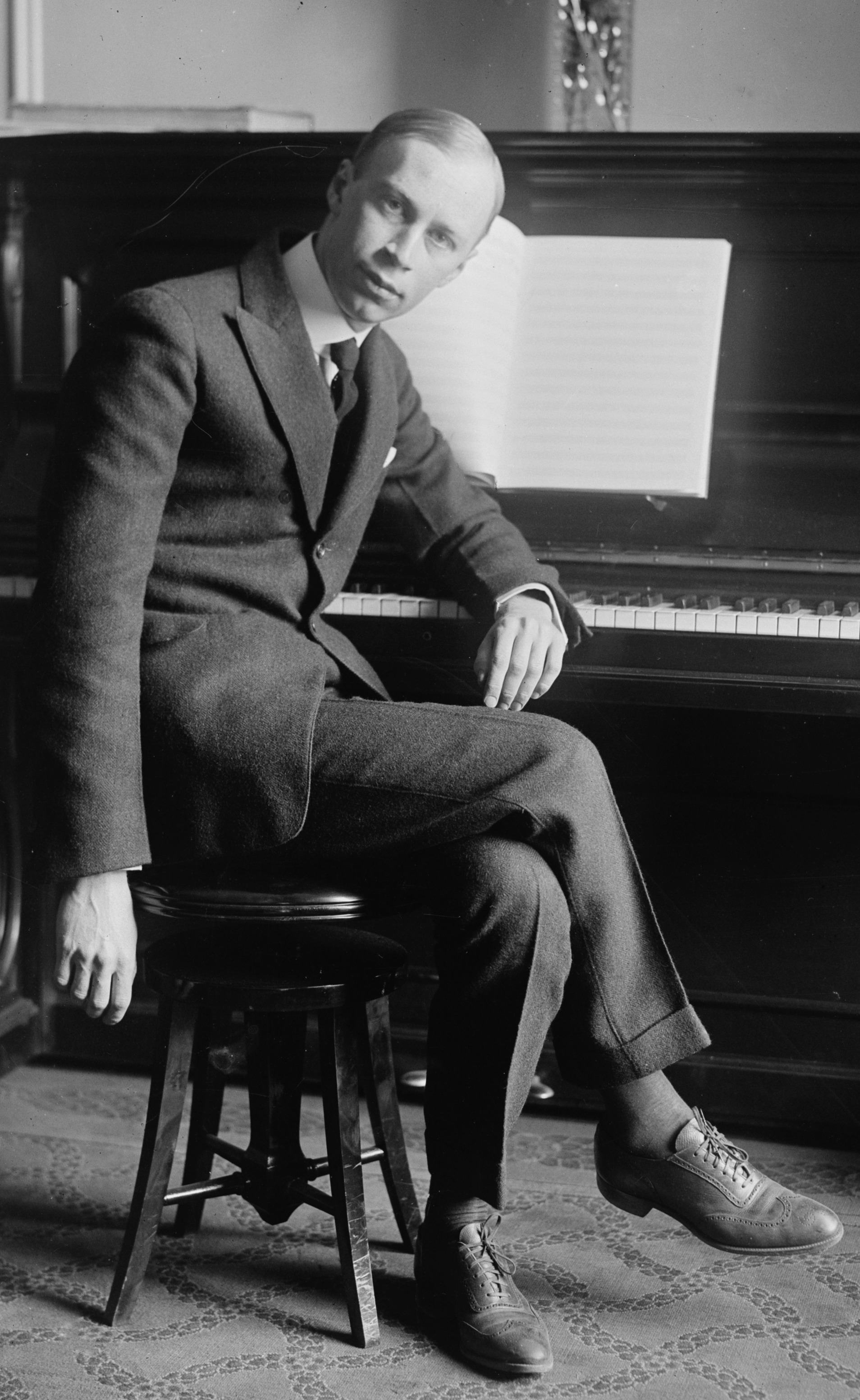
Sergei Prokofiev c. 1918

Tales of an Old Grandmother, Op. 31 (Russian: Сказки старой бабушки, romanized: Skazki staroy babushki) is a set of four piano pieces by Sergei Prokofiev. It was composed in 1918 and premiered by the composer himself on January 7 the following year in New York City, probably at Aeolian Hall. It has an approximate duration of ten minutes and it was first published by Gutheil in Moscow in 1922. It was composed during Prokofiev's exile in the United States after the outbreak of the Russian Revolution. An arrangement for orchestra also exists.

== Background ==
Prokofiev's pianistic output of this period is scarce since he put all his efforts into composing his opera The Love for Three Oranges. He also composed, around that time, Four Pieces, Op. 32. Both were written in order to mitigate his economic situation because of the delay of the opera's premiere; however, he did not obtain the money in royalties he expected for them.

== Description ==
The set of works describes an old grandmother narrating tales to her young grandson who listens carefully in her lap. It is full of nostalgia, with all the movements written in minor keys.

The work comprises four untitled movements:

1. Moderato (D minor)
2. Andantino (F♯ minor)
3. Andante assai (E minor)
4. Sostenuto (B minor)

A performance lasts between eight and ten minutes.

== Sources ==
- Prokofiev, Sergei (1991). Soviet Diary 1927 and Other Writings. London: Faber and Faber.
- Shlifstein, S, ed. (1961). S. Prokofiev: Autobiography, Articles, Reminiscences. Moscow: Foreign Languages Publishing House.
