= Four Pieces for Piano, Op. 4 (Prokofiev) =

Four Pieces for Piano
- by Sergei Prokofiev
- Opus: 4
- Year: 1908
- Duration: 7 minutes approx.
- Movements: 4
- Scoring: Piano

Four Pieces for Piano, Op. 4 (Russian: Четыре пьесы для фортепиано) is the third set of short pieces for piano by Russian composer Sergei Prokofiev. Notably, this set includes the Suggestion diabolique, one of the composer's best-known works.

== Background ==
Prokofiev's Op. 4 was one of the compositions that were born out of his frustration with his teacher Anatoly Lyadov from the St. Petersburg Conservatory. During his involvement with the “Evenings of Contemporary Music”, a series of concerts about contemporary music hosted by Alfred Nourok and Walter Nouvel, beginning in 1908, Prokofiev presented several of his newest piano works, including the pieces that would become Op. 4, composed in 1908 but later revised for publication between 1910 and 1912. These performances, given alongside other early sets such as Op. 2 and Op. 3, which are also entitled Four Pieces for Piano, played an important role in establishing his reputation as a bold young modernist. Prokofiev cited the Suggestion diabolique retrospectively as a notable part of his search to find "a language in which to express strong emotions".

The premiere took place on December 18, 1908, at the St. Petersburg Conservatory, with the composer at the piano. It was published in Moscow after it was revised, in 1913, by P. Jurgenson, and has been republished by many other publishers, such as Muzgiz, Anton J. Benjamin, and Dover Publications.

== Structure ==
The set consists of four short pieces for solo piano. It has an approximate total duration of 7-8 minutes. The list of movements is as follows:

1. Воспоминания (Reminiscences). Tranquillo
2. Порыв (Elan). Molto allegro
3. Отчаяние (Despair). Andante con agitazione e dolore
4. Наваждение (Suggestion diabolique / Diabolic Suggestion). Prestissimo fantastico

The fourth movement is arguably this set's most famous piece, and one of Prokofiev's best-known works for piano.

== Recordings ==
Prokofiev was so fond of his Suggestion diabolique that he recorded the piece under HMV, along with his third piano concerto and some other works for solo piano, particularly a few Visions fugitives, a solo piano arrangement of the gavotte from his Classical symphony, and the second movement of his Piano Sonata No. 4. The recording of the Suggestion took place on January 4, 1935, in Paris. This piece has been recorded in full many times by various pianists, even though it is also common for pianists to record only the fourth movement.
