= Waltz Suite (Prokofiev) =

Musical composition

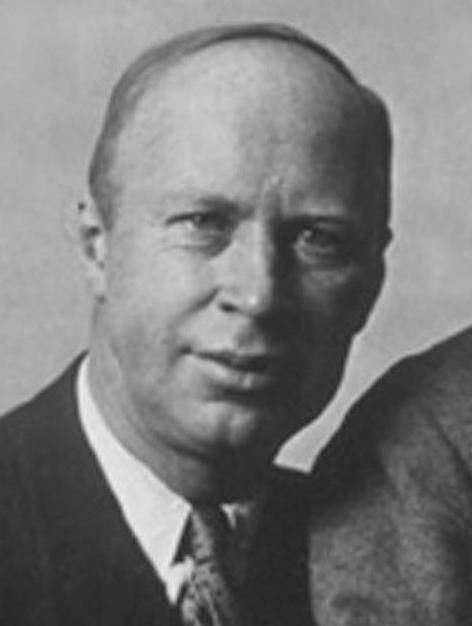
Sergei Prokofiev in 1936

Sergei Prokofiev composed and compiled his Waltz Suite, Op. 110, during the Soviet Union's post-Great Patriotic War period of 1946–1947.

In creating this work for the concert hall, the composer drew upon waltzes previously written for three of his most recent works for the stage and screen: the opera War and Peace (completed circa 1943–1944 but not yet premiered at that time); the ballet Cinderella (stage premiere, 1945); and, lastly, his score to the 1943 Soviet film Lermontov by Albert Gendelshtein and Konstantin Paustovsky.

== Movements ==
The Waltz Suite comprises six movements, or waltzes:

1. Since We Met, from War and Peace
2. In the Palace, from Cinderella
3. Mephisto Waltz, from Lermontov
4. End of the Fairy Tale, from Cinderella
5. New Year's Eve Ball, from War and Peace
6. Happiness, from Cinderella

== Premiere ==
The work's premiere was conducted by the composer himself on 13 May 1947 in Moscow.

The suite had its American premiere in Kansas City, Missouri, on 2 December 1958, more than five years after the composer's death.

== Recordings ==
Among recordings of the Waltz Suite released on compact disc are ones by:

- Marin Alsop, conducting the São Paulo State Symphony Orchestra (Naxos)
- Neeme Järvi, conducting the Scottish National Orchestra (Chandos)
- Theodore Kuchar, conducting the National Symphony Orchestra of Ukraine (Naxos)
- Gennady Rozhdestvensky, conducting the Moscow Radio Symphony Orchestra (Russian Revelation)
- Hans Schwieger, conducting the Kansas City Philharmonic (Varèse Sarabande)
- Alexander Titov, conducting the Saint Petersburg Philharmonic Orchestra (Beaux Authentics).
