= Seven, They Are Seven =

Cantata by Sergei Prokofiev

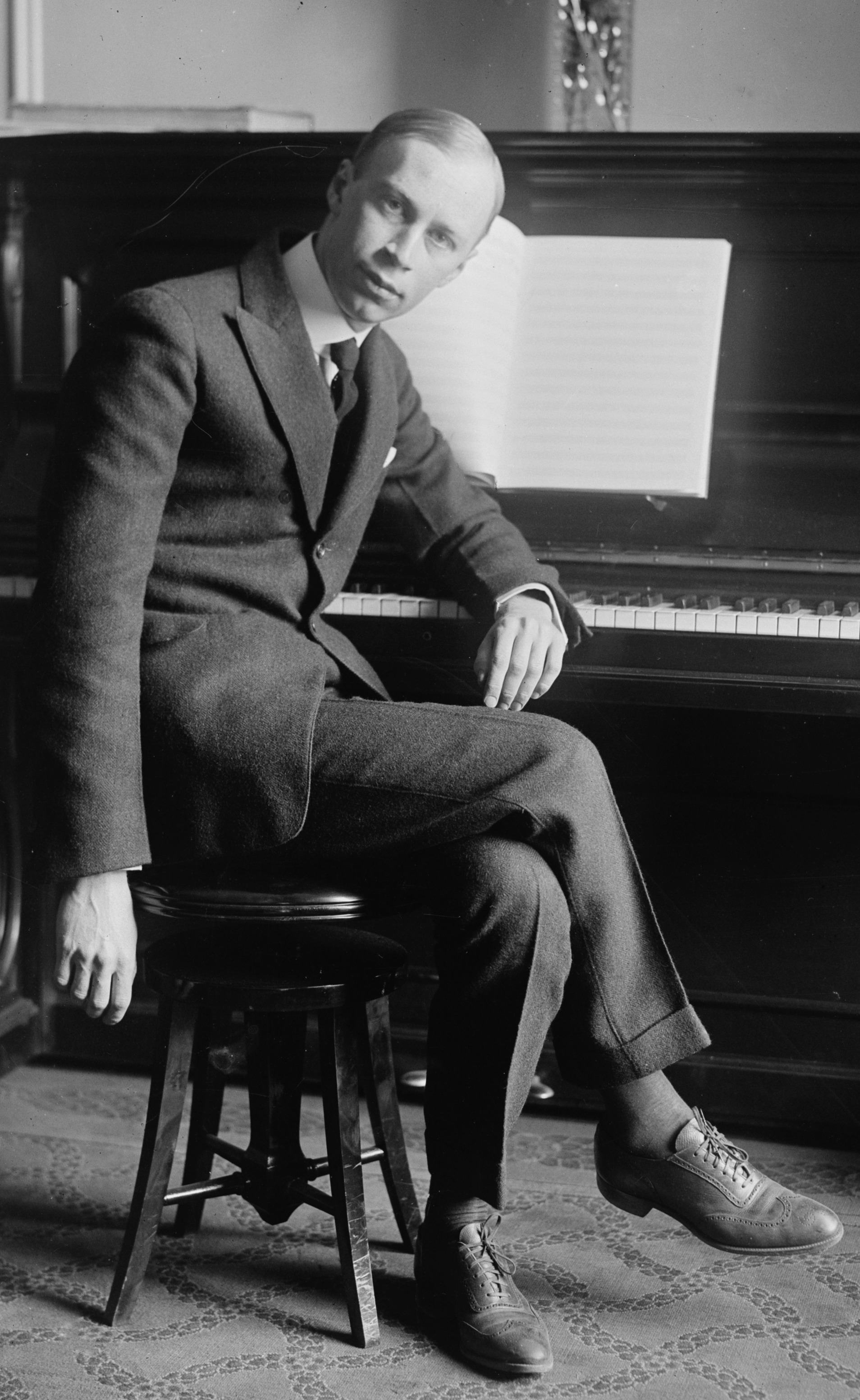
Sergei Prokofiev c. 1918

Seven, They Are Seven (Russian: Семеро их) (op. 30) is a cantata by Sergei Prokofiev composed in 1917 for large orchestra, choir, and tenor soloist. It was composed in Yessentuki and Kislovodsk, and the words are taken from the poem Ancient Calls (Зовы древности) by Konstantin Balmont. It was revised by Prokofiev in 1933.

The work was composed in the year that the Russian tsar, Nicholas II of Russia, was overthrown. This was followed by the Russian Civil War, and Seven, They Are Seven was not performed until 1924 in Paris, and was conducted by Serge Koussevitzky. It was first performed in Russia in 1956, three years after Prokofiev had died.

The poem that the work was composed to is a Russian translation of a cuneiform in a Mesopotamian temple from the third millennium BC. It describes seven demonic gods who have power over the elements, and also describes the power of these gods.
