= Pushkin Waltzes (Prokofiev) =

Orchestra works by Sergei Prokofiev

Sergei Prokofiev wrote the two Pushkin Waltzes (Op. 120) in 1949. The waltzes were written to a commission from the Moscow Radio Committee, for 1949 was the 150th anniversary of Pushkin's birth.

The two waltzes (lasting around 8 minutes) are titled:

1. Allegro espressivo (F major)
2. Allegro meditativo (C♯ minor)

The work is scored for 2 flutes, 2 oboes, cor anglais, 2 clarinets, bass clarinet, 2 bassoons, 4 horns, 2 trumpets, 3 trombones, tuba, percussion (timpani, bass drum, snare drum, wood blocks, cymbals, tambourine, and triangle), and strings.

== Premiere ==
01-Jan-1952, Moscow (radio performance), conducted by Samuel Samosud.

== Recordings ==
Orchestra	Conductor	Record Company	Year of Recording	Format
National Symphony Orchestra of Ukraine	Theodore Kuchar	Naxos Records	1995	CD
Royal Scottish National Orchestra	Neeme Järvi	Chandos Records	1985	CD
Seattle Symphony Orchestra	Gerard Schwarz	Delos	?	CD
USSR Radio/TV Large Symphony Orchestra	Fuat Mansurov	Consonance	1973	CD
USSR Radio Symphony Orchestra	Samuil Samosud	Melodiya	ca. 1958	LP
