= Music for Children (Prokofiev) =

- by Sergei Prokofiev
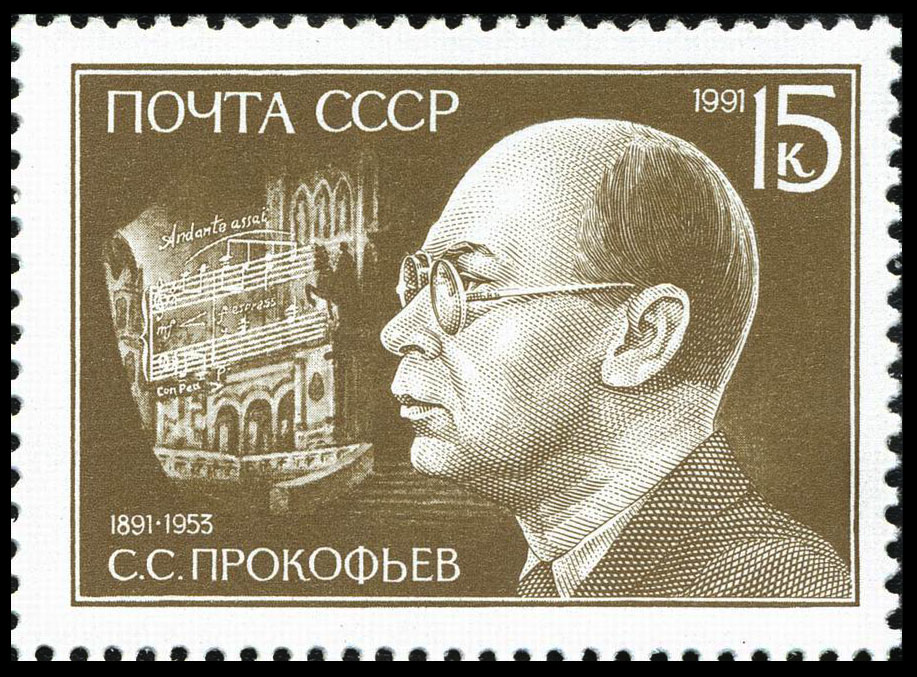
- Opus: Op. 65
- Composed: 1935
- Performed: April 11, 1936, Moscow
- Duration: approx. 18 minutes
- Movements: 12 character pieces

Music for Children, Op. 65 (Russian: Музыка для детей, Muzyka dlya detey), is a cycle of twelve character pieces for piano by Sergei Prokofiev (1891–1953). Composed in 1935, it is – beside its compositors qualities – considered one of the most popular collections of pedagogical piano music of the 20th century.

== Background ==
Prokofiev completed Music for Children in 1935, inspired by his former stays in Paris, in the same year as his ballet Romeo and Juliet, Op. 64, and his Six Mass Songs, Op. 66. The work was written during a period when Prokofiev was preparing for his return to the Soviet Union, which he completed in 1936.

The twelve pieces were first published in 1935 in Berlin by Éditions Russes de Musique. Prokofiev himself performed the premiere on April 11, 1936, in Moscow.

== Structure ==
The cycle consists of twelve short character pieces, each depicting a childlike scene or mood:

1. "Morning (Утро)"
2. "Promenade (Прогулка)"
3. "A Little Story (Сказочка)"
4. "Tarantella (Тарантелла)"
5. "Regret (Раскаяние)"
6. "Waltz (Вальс)"
7. "Parade of the Grasshoppers (Шествие кузнечиков)"
8. "The Rain and the Rainbow (Дождь и радуга)"
9. "Playing Tag (Пятнашки)"
10. "March (Марш)"
11. "Evening (Вечер)"
12. "The Moon Strolls in the Meadow (Ходит месяц над лугами)"

Seven of these were later orchestrated by Prokofiev and published in 1941 as the suite Summer Day (or A Summer Day), Op. 65.

== Style ==
Music for Children reflects Prokofiev's neoclassical style: clear forms, memorable melodies, and harmonic modernity with occasional modal coloring and bitonality. The pieces are miniatures in simple AB or ABA forms, combining technical accessibility with expressive characterization. Rhythmic variety, syncopated motifs, and dance-like energy lend the cycle its playful charm.

== Educational value ==
The cycle is aimed at young and intermediate piano students. It fosters technique, articulation, dynamics, and musical imagination, with titles that invite programmatic interpretation.

== Reception ==
In the Soviet Union, Music for Children quickly became part of the standard teaching repertoire and was widely reprinted. While not as famous as Peter and the Wolf or Romeo and Juliet, it is regarded as a successful example of high-quality music written for children. Individual pieces werde or continue to be performed in concert by pianists such as Sviatoslav Richter, Evgeny Kissin, and Anna Malikova and (many) others.

== Significance ==
The work marked a turning point in Prokofiev's career, moving from more avant-garde compositions toward a more accessible, folk-inspired idiom compatible with Soviet cultural policy. Later composers such as Dmitry Kabalevsky and Aram Khachaturian adopted this approach.

In the next year he composed Peter and the Wolf (Russian: Петя и волк, romanized: Pétya i volk), Op. 67 (1936) – a musical fairy tale for children, one of his most famous works, in which each instrument represents an animal or a character.

== See also ==
- Peter and the Wolf

== Literature ==
- Peter Klein: Sergei Prokofiev's Children's Pieces, Op. 65: a comprehensive approach to learning about a composer and his works: biography, style, form and analysis. SpringerPlus, 2014 (Online)
