= Gutheil (publisher) =

Russian music publishing firm (founded 1859)

Gutheil, sometimes spelled Gutkheyl, was a Russian music publishing firm based in Moscow. It was founded in 1859 by Aleksandr Bogdanovich Gutheil (1818–1882) and included among its clientele composers Aleksander Gurilyov and Aleksandr Varlamov. In 1886 the firm acquired the publishing company of Fyodor Stellovsky; purchasing the business from his sister after both Stellovsky and his wife were deceased. Through this transaction they gained the rights to works composed by Mily Balakirev, Alexander Dargomyzhsky, Mikhail Glinka, and Alexander Serov. The firm was Sergei Rachmaninoff's sole publisher from 1892–1914.

In 1882 Aleksandr Gutheil died and his son Karl Gutheil (born 1851) took over the business. He sold the firm to Serge Koussevitzky in 1914 who absorbed it into his publishing firm Editions Russes.
