= Songs of Our Days (Prokofiev) =

Cantata by Sergei Prokofiev

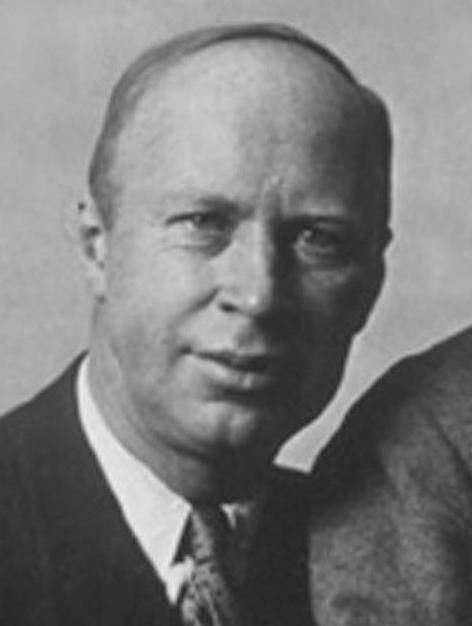
Sergei Prokofiev in 1936

Songs of Our Days, Op. 76 (Russian: Песни наших дней), is a rarely performed cantata for mezzo-soprano and baritone soloists, chorus and orchestra composed by Sergei Prokofiev in 1937, during the height of Stalin's power. With rousing marches and text extolling (somewhat unrealistically) Russian virtues and Stalin's magnanimity, the work is composed in a much more approachable style than one would expect of Prokofiev's music during this period.

The total work contains eight songs:

1. March – a Russian march for the full orchestra only
2. Over the Bridge, Cavalry Song – for the male chorus
3. Goodbye! – solo baritone and chorus
4. Golden Ukraine, Folksong – full chorus
5. Brother for Brother – solo baritone and chorus
6. Girls – solo baritone and chorus
7. A Twenty-year old – solo baritone and chorus
8. Lullaby – mezzo-soprano and chorus
9. October Flame – full orchestra and chorus

The text contains many references to Stalin. These were subsequently removed during the Khrushchev Thaw.

The work was premiered on January 5, 1938 in Moscow, conducted by Aleksandr Gauk.

The work was first premiered in Western Europe with the original text by the Goldsmiths Sinfonia and Chorus in London, conducted by Alexander Ivashkin.
