= Piano Sonata No. 10 (Prokofiev) =

Sergei Prokofiev's Piano Sonata No. 10 in E minor, Op. 137 (1952) is an unfinished sonata composed for solo piano.

== Movements ==
1. unfinished - fragment - Contains only the exposition

== Length ==
A performance of this fragment of a sonata lasts approximately 1 minute and 10 seconds. It's tempo marking is 'Allegro Moderato'
