= Cello Concertino (Prokofiev) =

Incomplete work by Sergei Prokofiev

Sergei Prokofiev's Cello Concertino in G minor, Op. 132 was left incomplete at the composer's death in 1953. It was completed by Mstislav Rostropovich and Dmitry Kabalevsky.

== History ==
Prokofiev had been impressed by Mstislav Rostropovich, after working with him for his Symphony-Concerto, so he undertook to write a number of other cello pieces for him. The Cello Concertino was such a piece, intended to be of a light nature.

Prokofiev's death in 1953 left the work unfinished, the finale in particular. However, the composer had indicated to Rostropovich what his intentions were, so he undertook to complete it. Dmitry Kabalevsky orchestrated the piece.

== Movements ==
The concertino is approximately 19 minutes in duration.

1. Andante mosso
2. Andante
3. Allegretto

== Sources ==
- Liner notes by Andrew Huth to DG recording of the Cello Concertino
