= Piano Sonata No. 1 (Prokofiev) =

Sergei Prokofiev's Piano Sonata No. 1 in F minor, Op. 1 was written in 1909. It consists of a single movement in sonata form marked Allegro – Meno mosso – Piu mosso – Meno mosso.
