= Piano Sonata No. 2 (Prokofiev) =

Solo piano piece

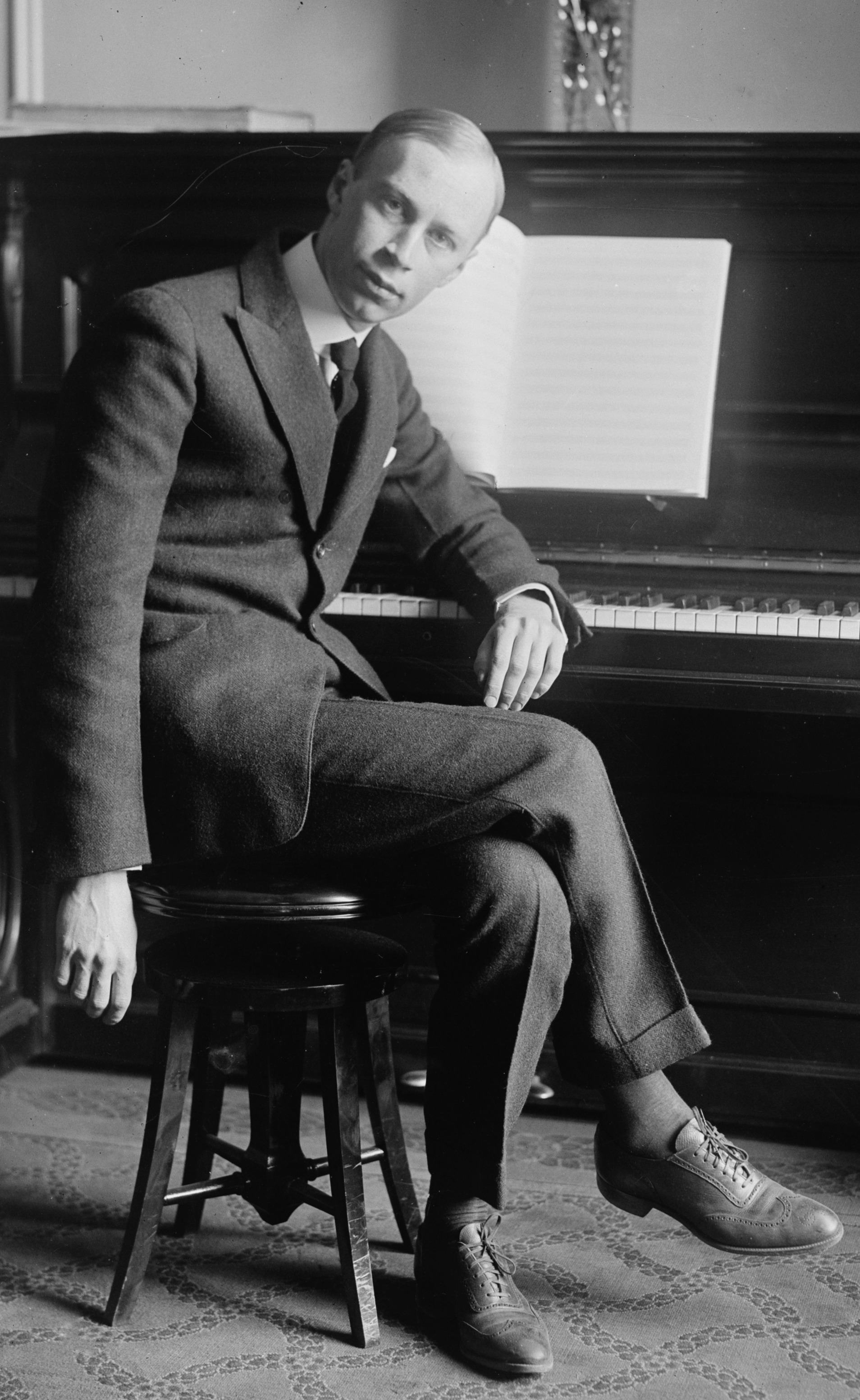
Sergei Prokofiev c. 1918

Sergei Prokofiev's Piano Sonata No. 2 in D minor, Op. 14, is a sonata for solo piano, written in 1912. First published by P. Jurgenson in 1913, it was premiered on 5 February 1914 in Moscow with the composer performing. Prokofiev dedicated the work to his friend and fellow student at the St. Petersburg Conservatory, Maximilian Schmidthof, who committed suicide in 1913. Concert pianist Boris Berman has said of this sonata that it 'covers a huge emotional range: from Romantic lyricism to aggressive brutality'.

== Movements ==
The piano sonata has four movements:

1. Allegro, ma non troppo – Più mosso – Tempo primo (in D minor)
2. Scherzo. Allegro marcato (in A minor)
3. Andante (in G♯ minor)
4. Vivace – Moderato – Vivace (in D minor)

== Sources ==
- Berman, Boris (2008). Prokofiev's Piano Sonatas: A Guide for the Listener and the Performer. London: Yale University Press. ISBN 978-0-300-14500-7.
