= Piano Sonata No. 4 (Prokofiev) =

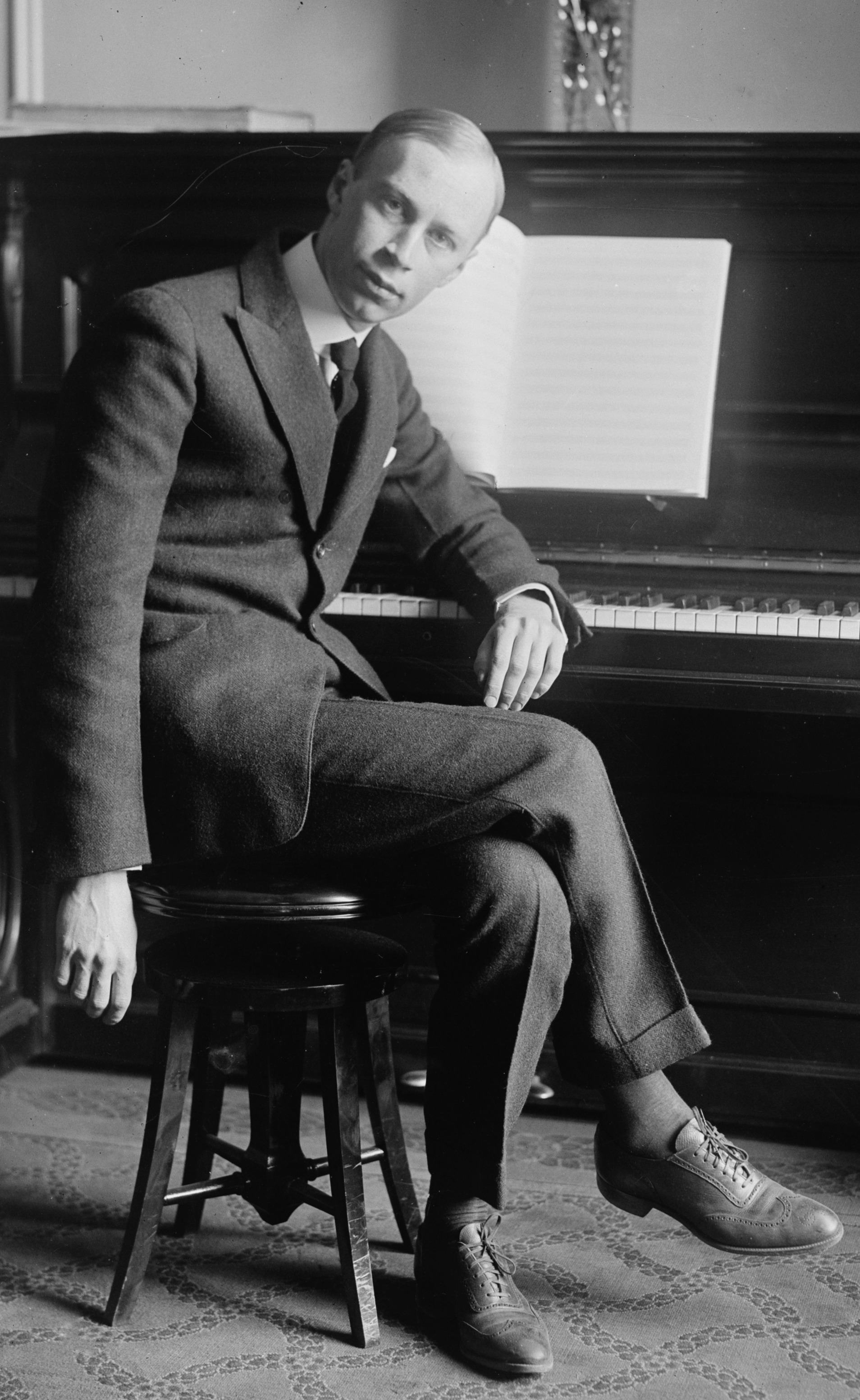
Sergei Prokofiev c. 1918

Sergei Prokofiev's Piano Sonata No. 4 in C minor, Op. 29, subtitled D’après des vieux cahiers, or After Old Notebooks, was composed in 1917 and premiered on April 17 the next year by the composer himself in Petrograd. The work was dedicated to Prokofiev's late friend Maximilian Schmidthof, whose suicide in 1913 had shocked and saddened the composer.

== Movements ==
The piano sonata has three movements:

1. Allegro molto sostenuto
2. Andante assai
3. Allegro con brio, ma non leggiero

== Style ==
In his notes accompanying the full set of recordings of Prokofiev's sonatas by Boris Berman, David Fanning states the following:

Whether the restrained, even brooding quality of much of the Fourth Sonata relates in any direct way to Schmidthof's death is uncertain, but it is certainly striking that the first two movements both start gloomily in the piano's low register. Allegro molto sostenuto is the intriguing and apt marking for the first, in which a hesitant and uncertain mood prevails - the reverse of Prokofiev's usual self-confidence. The Andante assai second movement alternates between progressively more elaborate statements of the opening theme and a nostalgic lyrical episode reminiscent of a Rachmaninov Etude-tableau; finally the two themes are heard in combination. With the rumbustious finale Prokofiev seems to be feeling himself again. But for all the gymnastics with which the main theme is varied there is less showiness in this essentially rather introvert work than in any of the other piano sonatas.

In his own notes accompanying the full set of recordings of Prokofiev's piano works by Frederic Chiu, he writes:

Poles apart from the high-energy display of its twin, the Fourth Sonata looks inwardly. Its first movement is the most tenebrous movement in all of the Sonatas. Buried deep in the lower third of the keyboard where the close motion and full chords speak with difficulty, the irregular placement of slurred two-note motifs in triple time creates an ambiguous pulsation, which the later appearance of a light, chirping melody does nothing to clarify. This play with rhythm and sound was a rare experiment for Prokofiev, whose preferred musical genre was the march, and whose consistent rhythmic intelligibility is a joy for ballet dancers everywhere. The second movement provides no respite from the darkness. The cloudy atmosphere persists, created by the multiple layers of musical activity, which also reflects the movement’s origins as a symphonic work. Prokofiev the prankster makes a late but unmistakable appearance in the finale and, as always, rides the thin line between amusement and offense. The music begins by parodying the Alberti bass accompaniments so common in Classical piano writing, perks up what would otherwise be an unremarkable series of descending arpeggios by “missing” the bottom of each group by a half step, and otherwise creates havoc by haphazardly misplacing melodic notes by an octave.
