= Symphonic Song (Prokofiev) =

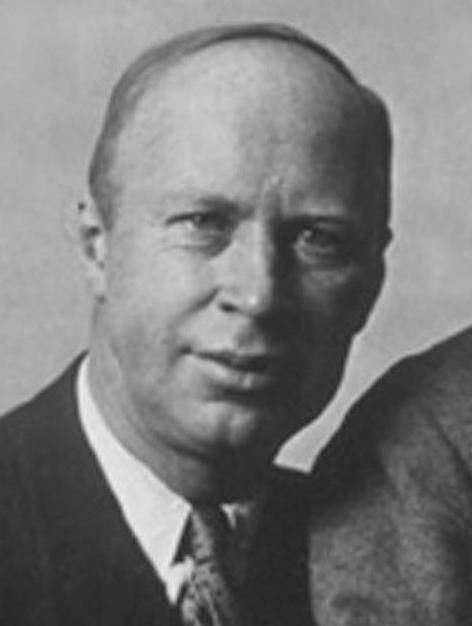
Sergei Prokofiev in 1936

Sergei Prokofiev's Symphonic Song (Russian: Симфоническая песнь), Op. 57, was written in 1933.

== Analysis ==
Symphonic Song is a work demonstrating Prokofiev's transition from Parisian modernism to Soviet lyricism. Prokofiev had described of it as "a serious piece of work, and I took great care in choosing the thematic material. It consists of three closely integrated parts."

Although there is no programme, the mood of the three parts might be defined as:

- Darkness: A dark and gloomy theme emerges. Crushing brass chords and eerie string sonorities add tension to the music.
- Struggle: The music becomes livelier, but there are still occasional dissonant outbursts.
- Achievement: A lyrical melody soars freely, and the music ends in ecstatic triumph.

The work lasts around 13 minutes, and is in one continuous movement.

== Instrumentation ==
The music is scored for piccolo, 2 flutes, 2 oboes, English horn, 2 clarinets, bass clarinet, 2 bassoons, contrabassoon, 4 horns, 3 trumpets, 3 trombones, tuba, percussion (timpani, cymbals, triangle, bass drum, snare drum, and tambourine), and strings.

== Premiere ==
14/04/1934, Moscow, conducted by Alexander Gauk.

== Recordings ==
Orchestra	Conductor	Record Company	Year of Recording	Format
Scottish National Orchestra	Neeme Järvi	Chandos Records	1989	CD
USSR Ministry of Culture State Symphony Orchestra	Gennadi Rozhdestvensky	Melodiya	?	LP
