= Sonata for Solo Cello (Prokofiev) =

Unfinished composition for solo cello by Sergei Prokofiev

Sergei Prokofiev began composing his Sonata for Solo Cello, Op. 134, in 1952. The sonata was intended to be written in four movements, but as it was one of seven compositions which the composer was writing during this time, only the beginning of the first movement (marked Andante) was completed before Prokofiev's death in March 1953.

While the first subject of the exposition of the Andante was written entirely by Prokofiev, the second subject was partially written by his friend, the cellist Mstislav Rostropovich. Prokofiev's writing resumes at the beginning of the development section of the Andante, yet the rest of the movement – and the rest of the sonata – was left unwritten. Years later, in 1972, the Russian musicologist and composer, Vladimir Blok, set about completing Prokofiev's Sonata for Solo Cello as a single, performable movement.

== Performances ==
Blok's reconstruction of the Sonata for Solo Cello was premiered by Natalia Gutman in Moscow in 1972, and was published the next year by publisher Hans Sikorski. It was not until a decade later, in 1984, that the first recording of the work was made by the British cellist, Steven Isserlis.

Rostropovich himself never recorded the sonata although he is known to have performed it during his lifetime. In addition to Isserlis, recordings were made by Alexander Ivashkin, Raphael Wallfisch,Yan Levionnois and Luciano Tarantino. Performances generally last between 8 and 12 minutes.

Isserlis performed this work at the funerals of both Lina Prokofiev (the composer's first wife) and Oleg Prokofiev (the composer's youngest son).

== Catalog inconsistencies ==
There is some disagreement when it comes to assigning the proper opus number to this sonata. Prokofiev marked the sonata's manuscript itself with Opus 133, but when dictating a list of his final compositions to his second wife Mira Mendelson just before he died, he told her that the sonata was to be Opus 134. Some scholars, such as Vladimir Blok, believe that the correct opus number is the one found on the manuscript itself – yet a consensus was never reached and therefore the Sonata for Solo Cello can now be found as Opus 133 or Opus 134 depending on the particular catalog, edition, or recording.

In addition to the inconsistent opus number, the sonata is often cataloged as "Sonata for Solo Cello in C♯ minor". This would likely have made sense if Prokofiev had completed the composition, but no part of the extant manuscript is in that key; Blok's reconstruction of the sonata is clearly based in the key of F♯ minor.
