= Chout =

Ballet by Sergei Prokofiev

Set and costume designs by Mikhail Larionov for the 1921 premiere at the Théâtre de la Gaîté-Lyrique in Paris

Chout, Op. 21, is a ballet by Sergei Prokofiev. It was originally composed in 1915, then extensively revised at the request of Serge Diaghilev in 1921. The composer extracted an orchestral suite from it, Op. 21 bis. The ballet's full title is Tale of the Jester Who Outwits Seven Other Jesters (Russian: Сказка про шута, семерых шутов перешутившего, romanized: Skazka pro shuta, semerykh shutov pereshutivshego). The most commonly used title for the work is based on the French transliteration of the Russian word for "jester", shut.

== Background ==
Chout was Prokofiev's first completed ballet score for Sergei Diaghilev. Diaghilev had first commissioned Ala and Lolli but rejected the score submitted by Prokofiev. Although the composer recast some of the music as the Scythian Suite, the projected ballet never saw the light of day. Instead, Diaghilev asked Prokofiev to write a ballet based on a folk tale recorded by Alexander Afanasyev. The story had been previously suggested to Diaghilev by Igor Stravinsky as a possible subject for a ballet, and Diaghilev and his choreographer Léonide Massine helped Prokofiev to shape this into a ballet scenario.

The story involves seven buffoons who all murder their wives after being told by an eighth buffoon that he has killed his own wife and brought her back to life with a magic whip and promises to do the same for them. When he fails to deliver on his promise, the other buffoons seek revenge. The principal buffoon is forced to disguise himself as a woman and is chosen for marriage by a wealthy merchant. He escapes after swindling the merchant out of 300 roubles.

Prokofiev wrote the score in 1915. Although Diaghilev was again not happy with the music, this time he was prepared to work with the composer to recast it into six scenes and retain the best parts of the music already written. He also wanted new entr'actes to make the music play continuously, which Prokofiev did, but not until 1920. In the meantime, the ballet was not produced. He revised the score while staying at Mantes-sur-Seine near Paris. He wrote the piano reduction while travelling by ship to the United States and finished the full score in early 1921 after his return to France. He played through the score for Stravinsky in Paris, who liked it. Shortly afterwards, Diaghilev also approved the changes. Over 40 per cent of the original score was either deleted or rewritten, and the required additional entr'actes were composed.

The first performance of the ballet was given by the Ballets Russes on 17 May 1921, at the Théâtre Municipal de la Gaîté, Paris, with choreography by Fyodor Slavinsky and supervision by Mikhail Larionov. The orchestra was conducted by the composer. It was fairly well received, however the London premiere on 9 June was bitterly attacked by audiences and critics alike.

== Structure ==
The structure of the ballet is:

- Scene 1: The Buffoon's Kitchen
- Entr'acte 1
- Scene 2: The Seven Clowns
- Entr'acte 2
- Scene 3: The Buffoon's Courtyard
- Entr'acte 3
- Scene 4: The Buffoon's Sitting Room
- Entr'acte 4
- Scene 5: The Buffoon's Bedroom
- Entr'acte 5
- Scene 6: In the Merchant's Garden

== Suite ==
Although he initially thought that a symphonic suite of 12 movements would be too long, in 1922-23 Prokofiev arranged such a suite from the ballet, which was premiered in Brussels on 15 January 1924 under Frans Rühlmann. The suite consists of:

1. The Buffoon and His Wife
2. Dance of the Wives
3. Fugue. The Buffoons Kill Their Wives
4. The Buffoon as a Young Woman
5. Third Entr'acte
6. Dance of the Buffoons' Daughters
7. Entry of the Merchant and His Welcome
8. In the Merchant's Bedroom
9. The Young Woman Becomes a Goat
10. Fifth Entr'acte and the Goat's Burial
11. The Buffoon and the Merchant Quarrel
12. Final Dance.

The 12 movements take 35–40 minutes to play (as compared to an hour for the full ballet).

While neither the ballet nor the suite can be said to have found a large following, the suite is performed more often than the ballet. The ballet was only presented once in the Soviet Union, in January 1928 under the Ukrainian title Blazen at the Kiev Theatre of Opera and Ballet under A. S. Orlov. The music had to be reconstructed from the symphonic suite, minus the entr'actes, resulting in prolonged pauses. Other attempts to stage it in the Soviet Union failed – Prokofiev refused to allow any changes. The suite has been recorded a number of times and has often been performed in concert, but it was not until the mid-1980s that Gennady Rozhdestvensky made the first recording of the entire music for the ballet.
