= Simon Morrison =

Scholar and writer

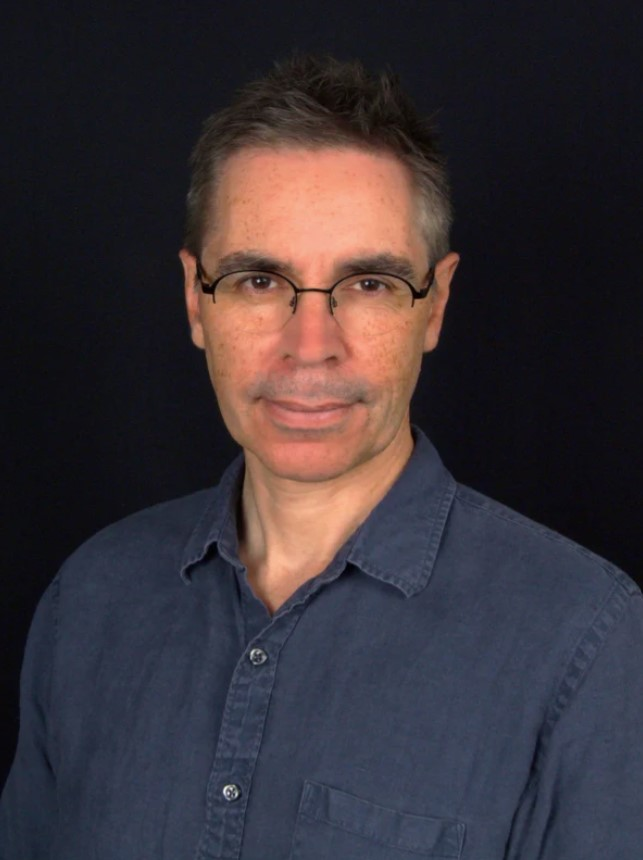
Professor Simon Morrison in 2022.

Simon Morrison is a scholar and writer specializing in 20th-century music, particularly Russian, Soviet, and French music, with special interests in dance, cinema, aesthetics, and historically informed performance based on primary sources.

He has conducted archival research in St. Petersburg, Stockholm, Paris, London, New York, Washington D.C., Copenhagen, Los Angeles, and extensively in Moscow. He has traveled to Tel Aviv, Beijing, Hong Kong, Montreal, Moscow, Copenhagen, Bangkok, Tokyo, and elsewhere to give invited lectures and graduate seminars. He divides his time between Princeton and Los Angeles.

Morrison is the author of Tchaikovsky's Empire (Yale University Press, 2024), named by the Financial Times as one of the "Best Books of the Year," Mirror in the Sky: The Life and Music of Stevie Nicks (California, 2022), Roxy Music's Avalon (Bloomsbury, 2021), Russian Opera and the Symbolist Movement (California, 2002, 2019), Bolshoi Confidential: Secrets of the Russian Ballet from the Tsars to Today (W.W. Norton, 2016), The Love and Wars of Lina Prokofiev (Houghton, 2013), and The People’s Artist: Prokofiev’s Soviet Years (Oxford, 2009) as well as editor of Prokofiev and His World (Princeton, 2008) and, with Klara Moricz, Funeral Games: In Honor of Arthur Vincent Lourié (Oxford, 2014).

His history of Moscow, A Kingdom and a Village: A One-Thousand-Year History of Moscow, is to be published by Knopf in spring 2026. He is currently at work on a study of Shostakovich to be published by Norton.

Morrison also maintains a profile as a public intellectual by continuing to write books and feature articles, assisting in ballet and theatre productions, and giving interviews and lectures in his areas of expertise, especially for the 92nd Street Y in New York.

== Career ==
Morrison received his B.Mus. from the University of Toronto (1987), Master's in Musicology from McGill University (1993), and Ph.D. from Princeton University (1997), where he is Professor of Music. His distinctions include the Alfred Einstein Award of the American Musicological Society (1999), an American Council of Learned Societies Fellowship (2001), a Phi Beta Kappa Society Teacher Award (2006), a Guggenheim Fellowship (2011), and the Howard T. Behrman Award for Distinguished Achievement in the Humanities (2022). He is a leading authority on composer Sergey Prokofiev and received unprecedented access to the composer's papers, housed in Moscow at RGALI.

=== As a writer ===
Morrison is most noted as a scholar of Russian and Soviet music, particularly Tchaikovsky, Prokofiev, and Shostakovich, and an expert on ballet. His archival study of the Bolshoi Ballet, Bolshoi Confidential, was published by Liveright (W.W. Norton) in 2016, with additional translations and editions from Random House (Canada), Fourth Estate (UK), and Belfond (France). It was widely reviewed in major news outlets and shortlisted for the Book Prize of Pushkin House, London.

His biography of Lina Prokofiev Lina and Serge: The Love and Wars of Lina Prokofiev was featured on BBC Radio 4 (as "Book of the Week"), BBC World News (TV), and WYNC. Favorable reviews appeared in The Guardian, The Boston Globe, The New Yorker, The Daily Beast, and The American Spectator.

Morrison is also author of The People's Artist: Prokofiev's Soviet Years (Oxford University Press, 2009) as well as Russian Opera and the Symbolist Movement (University of California Press, 2002; 2nd ed., 2019). As Scholar-in-Residence for the 2008 Bard Music Festival, he edited the essay collection Sergey Prokofiev and His World (Princeton University Press, 2008). Among his other publications are essays on Ravel's ballet Daphnis et Chloé, Rimsky-Korsakov, Scriabin, Shostakovich's ballet The Bolt, numerous reviews and shorter articles, including pieces for the New York Times, The New York Review of Books, and London Review of Books. In honor of the late scholar Boris Wolfson (d. 2024), Morrison edited Wolfson's unfinished monograph Travesty Actors: Self and Theater in Stalinist Culture (Northwestern University Press, forthcoming).

Morrison has also authored two books on popular music: Mirror in the Sky: The Life and Music of Stevie Nicks and Roxy Music's Avalon, about the eighth and final studio album by the English rock band Roxy Music, as part of its popular music series 33 1/3.

=== As a producer ===
Morrison is actively engaged in the performing arts, most notably ballet, and has translated his archival findings into new productions.

In 2005, he oversaw the recreation of the Prokofiev ballet Le Pas d'Acier at Princeton University and in 2007 co-produced a world premiere staging of Alexander Pushkin's drama Boris Godunov featuring Prokofiev's incidental music and Vsevolod Meyerhold's directorial concepts. In 2008, Morrison restored the scenario and score of the original (1935) version of Prokofiev's Romeo and Juliet for the Mark Morris Dance Group. The project involved orchestrating act IV (featuring a happy ending) from Prokofiev's annotations and rearranging the order and adjusting the content of acts I-III. This version of the ballet was premiered on July 4, 2008, and began an international tour in September. Morrison also brought to light Prokofiev's score Music for athletes/Fizkul’turnaya muzyka (1939), which Morrison describes as "cheerful, sardonic music composed for a scary political cause: a Stalinist (totalitarian) display of the physical prowess of Soviet youth."

In the spring of 2010, he staged Claude Debussy's final masterpiece, the ballet The Toy-Box (La boîte à joujoux), using a version of the score premiered in 1918 by the Moscow Chamber Theater that features a previously unknown "jazz overture." Also newly staged was the original version of John Alden Carpenter's jazz ballet, Krazy Kat (1921), based on the iconic comic strip.

In February 2012, Morrison oversaw a world-premiere performance of Prokofiev's incidental music for Eugene Onegin, set to a playscript by Sigizmund Krzhizhanovsky. A concert version was performed by the Princeton Symphony Orchestra, and the play staged by Princeton faculty and students. Both performances were part of a conference Morrison co-organized at Princeton, "After the End of Music History," celebrating the career of musicologist Richard Taruskin.

In 2017, Morrison collaborated with the Penguin Cafe Orchestra to present a revival of Within the Quota (1923), a ballet with music by Cole Porter. The production was featured on NPR, the BBC World News America, and in a news story by the AP.

=== As a public speaker ===
Morrison is a public speaker for both academic and general audiences. His areas of focus include the history of ballet in France, Russia, and the United States; the music of Tchaikovsky, Prokofiev, and Shostakovich; politics and culture in the Soviet Union, France, Russia, and the United States; Russian culture under Putin; cultural exchange between the Soviet Union and the United States; imperial culture under the Russian tsars; and contemporary developments in Russian music and dance.

He is sought after as a pre-concert lecturer, having been lauded at the Lincoln Center, Carnegie Hall, and the Metropolitan Opera in particular. He has spoken extensively on the music of Tchaikovsky, Prokofiev, Shostakovich, Debussy, Musorgsky, Beethoven, Poulenc, and many other beloved composers.

Morrison is a favored guest on radio and television programs worldwide, including broadcasts in Canada, Australia, New Zealand, Scotland, the UK, and United States.

== Selected publications ==
- “Prokofiev’s Gambler.” In Dostoevsky’s The Gambler: The Allure of the Wheel, edited by Svetlana Evdokimova. Lanham: Lexington Books, 2024.
- Tchaikovsky’s Empire. London: Yale University Press, 2024.
- Mirror in the Sky: The Life and Music of Stevie Nicks. Oakland: University of California Press, 2022; paper, 2024.
- "The Facts and Fictions of Shostakovich's Lady Macbeth." New York Times, October 6, 2022.
- "Still in Search of Satanilla," 19th-Century Music 46, no. 1 (2022): 3–38.
- "Canceling Russian Artists Plays into Putin's Hands," The Washington Post, March 11, 2022.
- “What Next? Shostakovich’s Sixth Symphony as Sequel and Prequel,” Twentieth-Century Music 16, no. 2 (2019): 1-27.
- “Tchaikovsky: Polestar of the music of the future,” Times Literary Supplement, March 21, 2019.
- [with Jason Wang and Nicholas Soter] “Whipped Cream – Viennese Ballet and Pop Surrealism Meet Dark Medicine,” Journal of the American Medical Association 321, no. 7 (2019): 630–31.
- "Galina Ustvolskaya Outside, Inside, and Beyond Music History,” Journal of Musicology 36, no. 1 (2019): 96–129.
- “The Golden Cockerel, Censored and Uncensored.” In Rimsky-Korsakov and His World, edited by Marina Frolova-Walker. Princeton: Princeton University Press, 2018.
- “Experience Prokofiev’s Romeo and Juliet – Without Dance,” Playbill, January 23, 2018.
- “Prokofiev: Reflections on an Anniversary, and a Plea for a New Critical Edition,” Iskusstvo muzïki. Teoriya i istoriya 16 (2017): 6-20.
- “Art in an Artless Age.” Times Literary Supplement, July 22, 2016, 16–17.
- “Landed: Cole Porter’s Ballet.” In A Cole Porter Companion, edited by Don M. Randel, Matthew Shaftel, and Susan Forscher Weiss. Urbana: University of Illinois Press, 2016.
- “‘Zolotoy Petushok’: zametki ob opere, kotoraya stala operoy-baletom i zatem baletom.” In Triumf russkoy muzïki. Rimskiy-Korsakov – okno v mir, edited by L. O. Ader. St. Petersburg: SPb GBUK, 2016.
- "What the Candidates' Rally Music Says About Them," Time, May 25, 2016.
- "Debussy's Toy Stories," The Journal of Musicology 30, no. 3 (2013).
- "Against Bare Bottoms," London Review of Books 35, no. 6, 2013.
- "The Bolshoi's Spinning Dance of Power," New York Times, November 26, 2013.
- Lina and Serge: The Love and Wars of Lina Prokofiev. New York: Houghton Mifflin Harcourt, 2013.
- The People's Artist: Prokofiev's Soviet Years. New York: Oxford University Press, 2009.
- [Editor]. Sergey Prokofiev and His World. Princeton: Princeton University Press, 2008.
- [with Nelly Kravetz]. "The Cantata for the Twentieth Anniversary of October, or How the Specter of Communism Haunted Prokofiev." Journal of Musicology 23, no. 2 (2006): 227–62.
- "Russia’s Lament." In Word, Music, History: A Festschrift for Caryl Emerson, edited by Lazar Fleishman, Gabriella Safran, Michael Wachtel. Stanford Slavic Studies 29-30 (2005).
- "Shostakovich as Industrial Saboteur: Observations on The Bolt." In Shostakovich and His World, edited by Laurel Fay. Princeton: Princeton University Press, 2004.
- Russian Opera and the Symbolist Movement. Berkeley and Los Angeles: The University of California Press, 2002; second edition, 2019.
- "Skryabin and the Impossible." Journal of the American Musicological Society 51, no. 2 (1998): 283–330; reprint, Journal of the Scriabin Society of America 7, no. 1 (2002–03): 29–66.
