= Lina and Serge: The Love and Wars of Lina Prokofiev =

2013 book by Simon Morrison

- Author: Simon Morrison
- Language: English
- Publisher: Houghton Mifflin Harcourt
- Publication date: March 2013

Lina and Serge: The Love and Wars of Lina Prokofiev was a biography of Lina Prokofiev, wife of composer Sergei Prokofiev, written by Simon Morrison and first published in the US during March 2013. The book was published in the UK the same month under the title The Love and Wars of Lina Prokofiev: the Story of Lina and Sergei Prokofiev.

== Reception ==
Stephen Walsh, writing in The Guardian, commented that "Morrison tells a good story, without excess or indulgence, and with touching empathy for his heroine."

The book was featured as BBC Radio 4's Book of the Week during March 2013.
