= The Giant (opera) =

Opera by Sergei Prokofiev

- Opera by Sergei Prokofiev
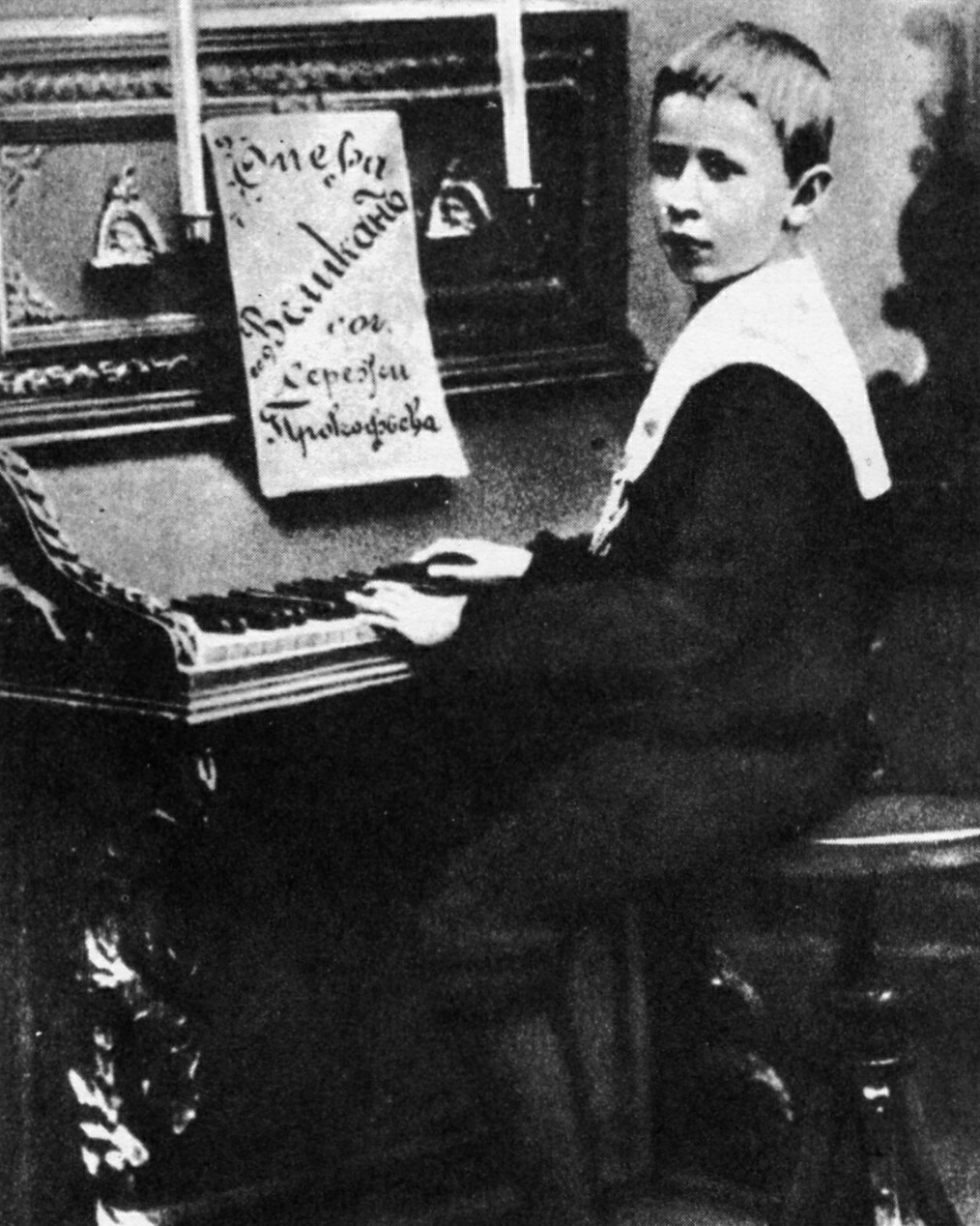
- The eight-year-old Prokofiev with the score of The Giant
- Native title: Russian: Великан
- Librettist: Prokofiev
- Language: Russian
- Premiere: c. 1900

The Giant (Russian: Великан, romanized: Velikan) is an opera in three acts by Sergei Prokofiev. The 12-page work was written for performance by the nine-year-old composer's family.

== Composition history ==
In 1899, at the age of eight, Prokofiev, who had already evinced remarkable musical abilities and had composed some piano pieces, was taken by his parents to Moscow, where he heard opera for the first time, (including Alexander Borodin's Prince Igor and Charles Gounod's Faust). Keen to write an opera of his own, he wrote out a libretto in three acts and six scenes. With the help of his mother, the music he devised for this was transcribed. The plot was elaborated from the children's games he played with his friends Egorka and Stenya, whose names are preserved in those of the characters. In the following year, the first act of the opera was given a premiere by the family at the estate of one of Prokofiev's uncles near Kaluga, with his aunt Tatiyana taking the title part, and the composer and his cousins taking the other leading roles. There is no record of further performances.

== Roles ==
Role	Voice type	Premiere Cast, Summer 1901 (first act only) (Director: Sergei Prokofiev - Piano accompaniment Andrei Rayevsky)
The Giant		Tatiyana Raevskaa
Sergeev		Sergey Prokofiev
Ustinia, the heroine		Katya Raevskaa
Egorov, Sergeev's friend		Shura Raevskiy
King		Raevskiy

== Synopsis ==
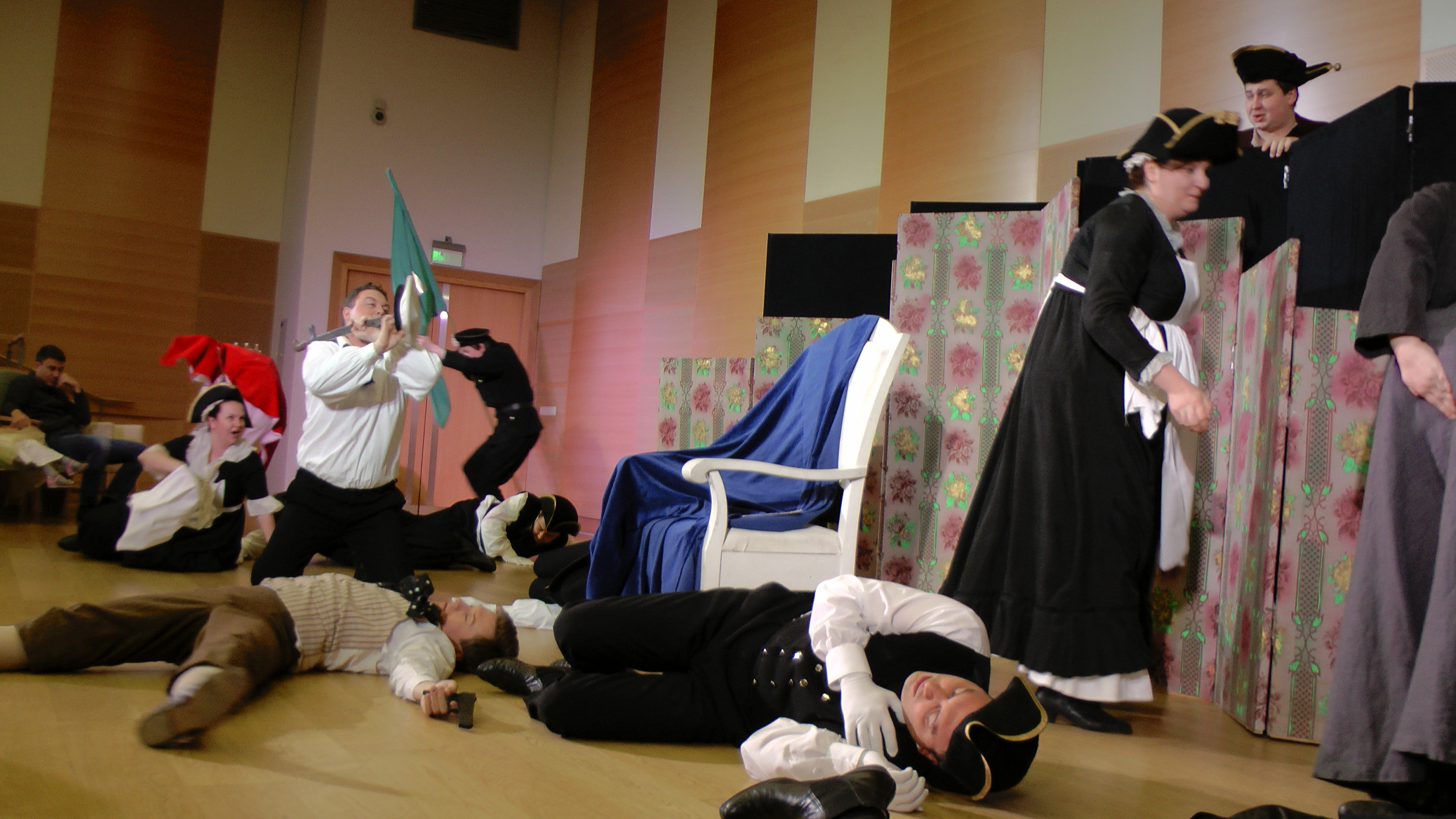
"The Giant" scene, 2016

The opera is apparently nearly entirely lost, although Nestyev quotes some musical extracts.

A terrible Giant tries to kidnap the little girl Ustinya, who is rescued by her friends Sergeyev and Yegorov with the assistance of a good King. However, according to Prokofiev's mother, the opera ended with the defeat of the King by the Giant. She wrote, "Now at the time of extremely strict monarchy, this idea was not approved of by the paternal authority, and the young composer, very much put out by this censorship, would not consent to write an ending involving a reconciliation.". Perhaps this refers to an earlier version, but scholarship has not advanced on this tricky point.

== Reception ==
The composer recalled that 'although I had directed the rehearsal [...] I was so nervous that when I came out on stage I began to sing the wrong part'. Nevertheless, the audience of six applauded and the composer's uncle said 'When your operas are performed on the Imperial stage, remember that your first opera was staged in my house'.

A TV documentary film about Prokofiev by Andrey Nekrasov The Prodigal Son (1991) contains a 'recreation' of the premiere of The Giant, but this is inaccurate since it shows Prokofiev at the piano, whereas it was his cousin Andrei who accompanied.
