= Lina Prokofiev =

Spanish singer (1897–1989)

Lina Ivanovna Prokofieva
- Born: Carolina Codina Nemísskaia; 21 October 1897; Madrid, Madrid Province, New Castile, Kingdom of Spain
- Died: 3 January 1989 (aged 91); London, England
- Other names: Lina Llubera
- Occupation: Singer
- Spouse: Sergei Prokofiev (1921–separation 1941; marriage declared null and void 1948)
- Children: 2

Lina Ivanovna Prokofieva (Russian: Лина Ивановна Прокофьева), born Carolina Codina Nemísskaia, (21 October 1897 – 3 January 1989) was a Spanish singer and the first wife of Russian composer Sergei Prokofiev. They married in 1923. Despite misgivings about her husband's decision to move to the Soviet Union, she settled there with him in 1936. They separated in 1941. In 1948, their marriage was ruled null and void, a verdict that was upheld in 1958 by the Supreme Court of the USSR. Her stage name was Lina Llubera.

== Early life ==
Carolina Codina was born in Madrid on 21 October 1897 to Olga Vladislavovna (née Nemísskaia) and Juan Codina y Llubera. Her mother was a Russian of Polish, Lithuanian, and Alsatian ancestry; her father was a Spaniard born to a Catalan family in Barcelona. Both of her parents were singers and they met while studying singing in Milan at the Theatre Academy of La Scala.

In 1899, Carolina traveled to Russia with her parents. Along the way they stayed with family friends in Moscow and Saint Petersburg, before arriving at her maternal grandparents' home in Odessa, where her grandfather worked for the Imperial Ministry of Railways. Although her father suffered from stage fright, he earned a successful living in Russia as a recitalist, and was referred to in the local press as the "distinguished Spanish tenor." By 1905, both of Codina's maternal grandparents were dead; her parents then decided to move to the United States.

The family lived in Switzerland before sailing across the Atlantic on the Statendam to New York City in 1907. Lina graduated from Brooklyn's Public School No. 3; the graduation was held at the nearby Commercial High School on 24 June 1913.

She worked for a month as an assistant to Russian socialist Catherine Breshkovsky in 1919.

== Marriage to Prokofiev and separation ==
In 1923 she married Prokofiev in Germany. After living in France and the United States, the couple settled permanently in the Soviet Union in 1936. Lina attempted to dissuade her husband from relocating with his family to his homeland after being urged to do so by Pierre Souvtchinsky, who drew her attention to the persecution of Dmitri Shostakovich in the wake of the official denunciation against his opera Lady Macbeth of the Mtsensk District. What Sergei said to reassure Lina about the matter is unknown, but a note he made to himself in a personal notebook from the time said: "The attacks on formalism neither affected me nor Myaskovsky."

In August 1938, Sergei met Mira Mendelson, a 23-year-old literary student who was a poet and translator. They were each vacationing in Kislovodsk with their respective families. What had begun as a professional partnership quickly developed into an extramarital affair. Although Sergei had initially been dismissive about Mira to Lina, within months he revealed to her the extent of his new relationship. Lina replied that she did not object to it as long as he did not go to live with her, she recalled in interviews decades later. Their marriage continued to deteriorate; on 15 March 1942, Sergei announced that he was going to live with Mira, effectively ending his marriage with Lina. A few months later when the German invasion of the Soviet Union threatened Moscow, Prokofiev tried to persuade Lina and their sons to accompany him as evacuees out of the capital, but Lina refused.

== Illegality of marriage and arrest ==
After the end of World War II, Sergei attempted to serve Lina with divorce papers through their son Oleg, who did not carry the task through for the sake of his mother's well-being. Sergei then filed for divorce in court on 22 November 1947. Five days later, the court announced that it had rejected his petition on the grounds that the marriage had been invalid in the first place because it had taken place outside of the country and was not properly registered with Soviet authorities. After a second court upheld the verdict, Sergei and his companion Mira were married on 13 January 1948.

On 20 February 1948, Lina was arrested. Her elder son Svyatoslav later stated that she had received a call in the evening requesting that she pick up a package addressed to her. Upon stepping out of her home, she was forced into a car that had been waiting outside. Her apartment was searched by the police, who confiscated various family heirlooms and artifacts. Frederick Reinhardt, an employee of the American Embassy in Moscow who was acquainted with Lina, suggested that her persistent efforts to obtain an exit visa had caused her to be noticed unfavorably by Soviet authorities. She was sentenced to incarceration in the gulag for 20 years, serving part of her sentence at the Intalag camp in the Komi ASSR, before being moved to the Mordovian ASSR to serve the remainder, in Abezlag. The specific charges were later listed in a petition for release that she submitted to Procurator General of the Soviet Union Roman Rudenko in 1954. They included "attempting to defect," "theft of a secret document," and "criminal ties" to foreign embassies. A fellow prisoner recalled that Lina attempted to follow her ex-husband's life and career, but that she only managed to learn of his death months after it had occurred:

[S]omeone came running from the bookroom and said: "They just announced on the radio that in Argentina a concert was held in memory of the composer Prokofiev." Lina Ivanovna began to weep and, without uttering a word, walked away.

== Release from the gulag ==
After serving eight years of her sentence, she was freed on 30 June 1956. Subsequent petitions to Shostakovich and Tikhon Khrennikov, the latter a friend of Lina, resulted in her successful rehabilitation during the Khrushchev Thaw. Soon thereafter, Lina petitioned the courts to have them reassert her rights as Prokofiev's sole and legitimate spouse. An initial ruling in her favor was reversed by the Supreme Court of the Soviet Union on 12 March 1958, which reaffirmed that their marriage had no legal validity. Shostakovich, Khrennikov, and Dmitry Kabalevsky were among the witnesses called upon by the court to testify in the case.

== Final years and death ==
In 1974 Lina left the Soviet Union. She outlived her ex-husband by many years, dying in London on 3 January 1989, and being buried in the French town of Meudon. Royalties from his music provided her with a modest income. Their sons Sviatoslav (1924–2010), an architect, and Oleg (1928–1998), an artist, painter, sculptor and poet, dedicated a large part of their lives to the promotion of their father's life and work. She was the subject of Simon Morrison's 2013 biography Lina and Serge: The Love and Wars of Lina Prokofiev.

== Notes ==
=== Sources ===
- Chemberdjí, Valentina (2010). Lina Prokófiev: Una española en el gulag (in Spanish). Translated by Novosílzov, Natalia. Madrid: Siglo XXI de España Editores, S.A. ISBN 978-84-323-1416-2.
- Morrison, Simon (2009). The People's Artist: Prokofiev's Soviet Years. Oxford University Press. ISBN 9780199830985.
- Morrison, Simon (2013). The Love and Wars of Lina Prokofiev: The Story of Lina and Serge Prokofiev. Random House. ISBN 978-1-4481-5626-9.
- Prokofiev, Sergei (2008). Diaries 1915–1923: Behind the Mask. Translated by Phillips, Anthony. London / Ithaca: Faber and Faber/Cornell University Press. ISBN 978-0-571-22630-6.
- Wilson, Elizabeth (1994). Shostakovich: A Life Remembered. Princeton University Press. ISBN 9780691029719.
