= Le pas d'acier (Prokofiev) =

Ballet by Sergei Prokofiev

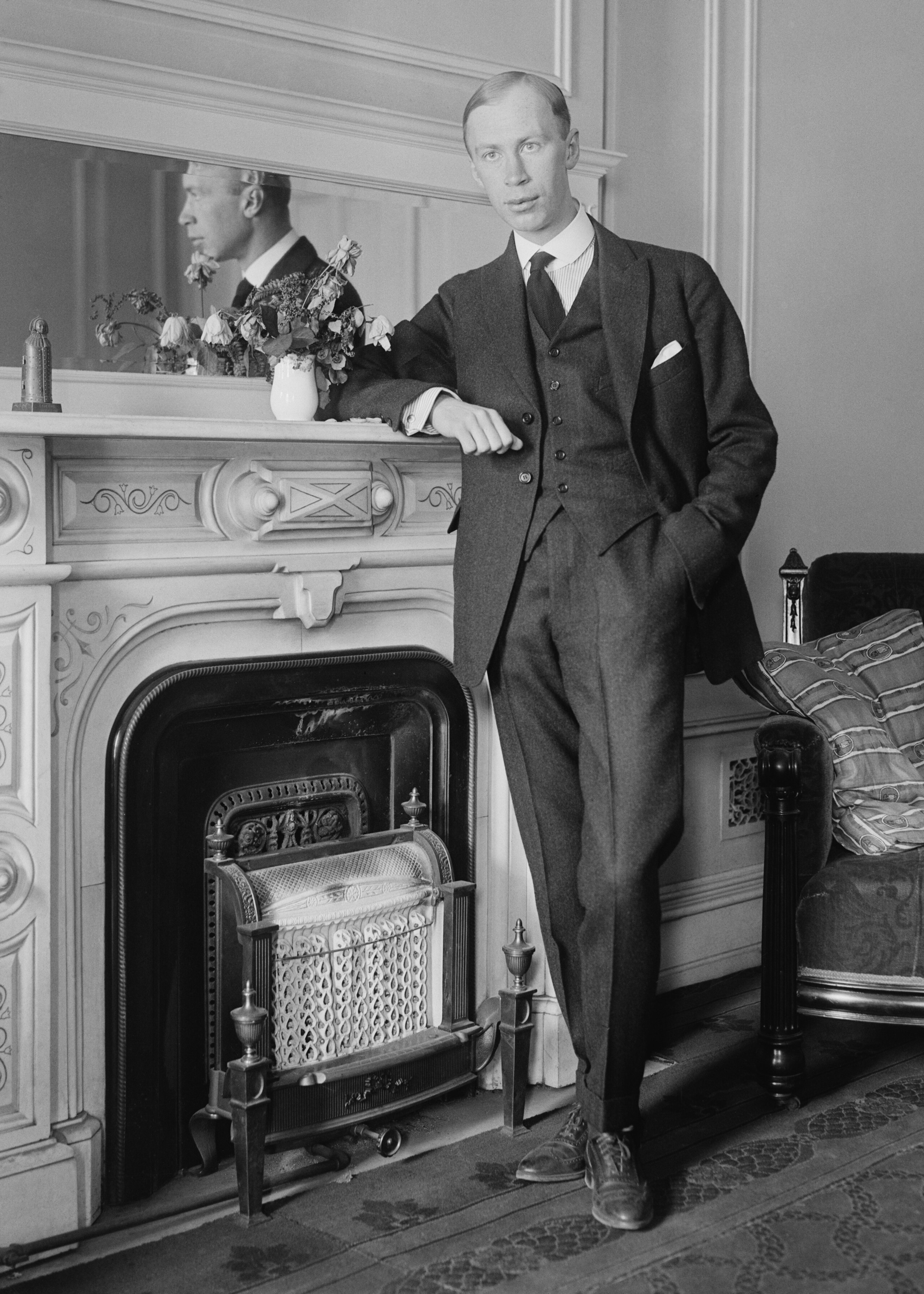
Sergei Prokofiev

Le pas d'acier (The Steel Step or The Leap of Steel; Russian: Стальной скок), Op. 41, is a 1926 ballet in two scenes containing eleven dances composed by Sergei Prokofiev. Prokofiev also created a four-movement orchestral suite from the ballet (Op. 41b).

== Origin ==
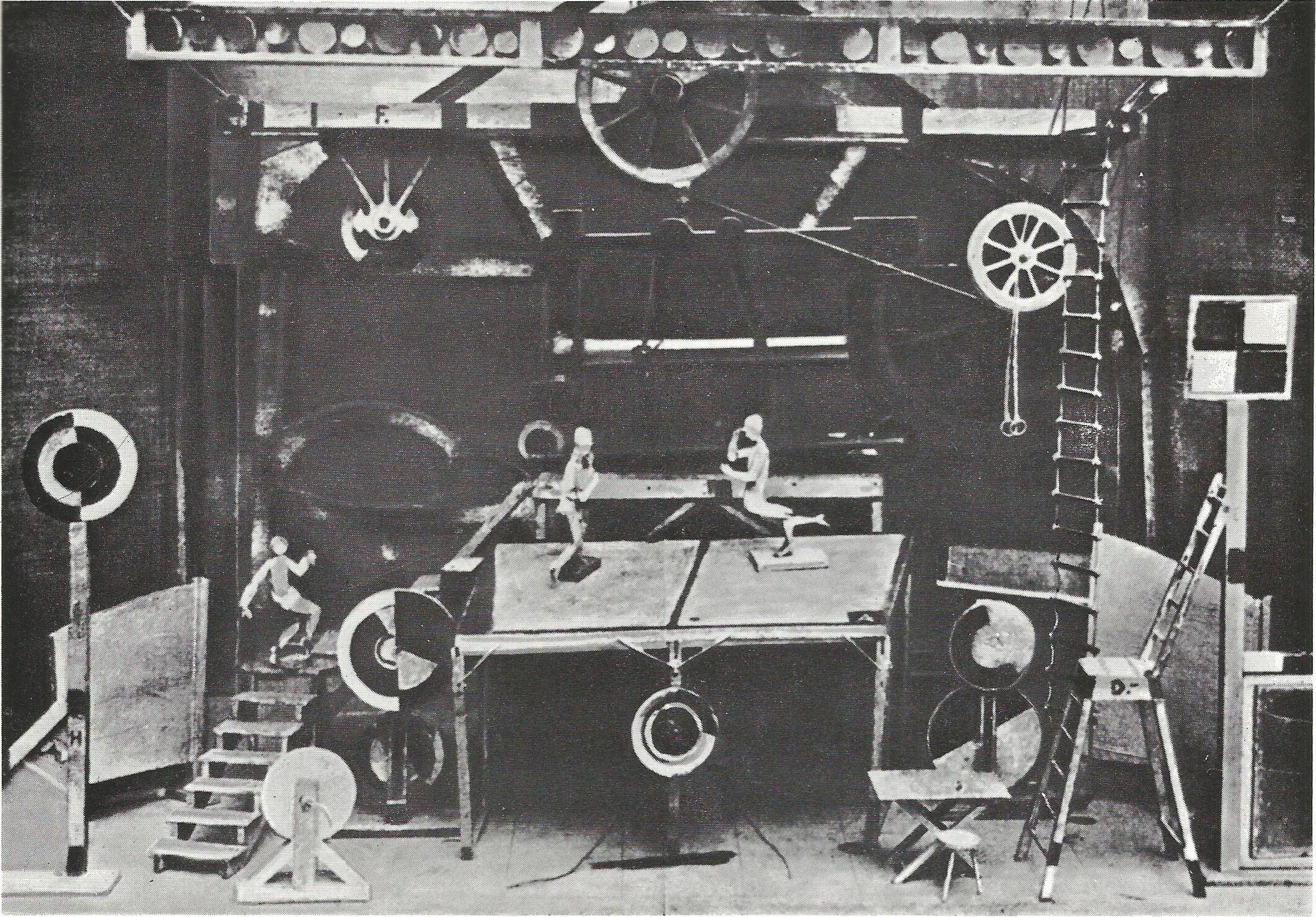
G. Yakulov. Scene model for the ballet Le pas d'acier (1927)

The ballet was commissioned by impresario Sergei Diaghilev, who had been greatly impressed by the exhibition in Paris in 1925 of Russian contemporary artists at the International Exposition of Modern Industrial and Decorative Arts, and was originally intended to "celebrate Soviet industrialization." Prokofiev wrote the score, based on a scenario by the Constructivist artist Georgi Yakulov and himself, in 1925–1926, much of it during his tour of the United States. Prokofiev wrote that his music represented "a move towards a Russian musical language, not that of the Fairy Tales of [the folklorist] Afanasyev, but one which could describe contemporary life. [...It] was a decisive step leading me towards chromaticism and diatonics [...] A whole series of themes is composed solely for the white keys."

The original scenario was titled Ursignol, and was approved by Diaghilev in the autumn of 1925. It appears however that over the next two years the story-line was changed, against Yakulov's wishes, as Diaghilev made preparations for the first production. The original scenario was rooted in scenes of Soviet life, of which Yakulov had experience (but the émigrés Prokofiev and Diaghilev did not), involving speculators, sailors and workers, and with scenes in a station, a market and a factory, centered on life in the early Soviet Union. The factory scene features machines and sprocketed wheels as the setting for a danced romance between a sailor and a young girl worker. It is interesting that in the factory scene the chromatic ostinato figure of the viola is nearly the same as the one of Mosolov's contemporary "Iron Foundry".

== Premiere ==
Although no record of the choreography of the eventual 1927 production has survived, it is clear from the comments of critics that the scenario had been altered from the original so as to include scenes of Russian folklore, which were a typical element of Ballets Russes productions. With choreography by Léonide Massine, the Ballets Russes premiered the work in Paris at the Théâtre Sarah-Bernhardt on June 7, 1927. Critical reaction was extremely mixed. The critic André Levinson wrote:

In this architectural decor agitates a poor drama, undecided between enthusiasm for Bolshevism and bitter irony. Only the musician was carried away in depth by the material – for the rest, is it a homage or a parody? Is it for real or cynical derision? Must one laugh or cry? Neither one nor the other, it seems to me, the superficial eccentricity conceals the pain of a fundamental emptiness and a dishonest conception.

Richard Taruskin notes that Igor Stravinsky, (from whose Rite of Spring Taruskin claims the Le pas d'acier "poached a bit"), "declared that it made him ill."

Wilhelm Furtwangler conducted a suite from the ballet in concert with the Vienna Philharmonic in 1929.

== Performance history ==
Le pas d'acier was a major success for Prokofiev and Diaghilev in Paris, where it was performed for three consecutive seasons. Diaghilev was a confirmed supporter of Prokofiev's compositions, going so far as to term him "my second son" (Stravinsky being his metaphorical "first"), and Diaghilev's death in 1929 removed Prokofiev's primary source of ballet commissions and practical support in the field in Paris and the West. The ballet was performed under new choreography and cast at the Bolshoi Theatre with the help of Prokofiev's friend Boris Gusan. It was also performed in London and, in 1931, in the USA, where the Philadelphia Public Ledger commented "one wonders whether [the ballet] is propaganda or music."

== Revival ==
After 1931, the next performance of the ballet was in 2005, when it was staged at Princeton University, New Jersey. This production was described as "faithful to the original, never-performed concept of a celebration of Soviet workers' lives, instead of a mockery of them, which was the version seen by audiences of the early 20th century."
