= Sergei Prokofiev =

Russian composer and pianist (1891–1953)

- Сергей Прокофьев
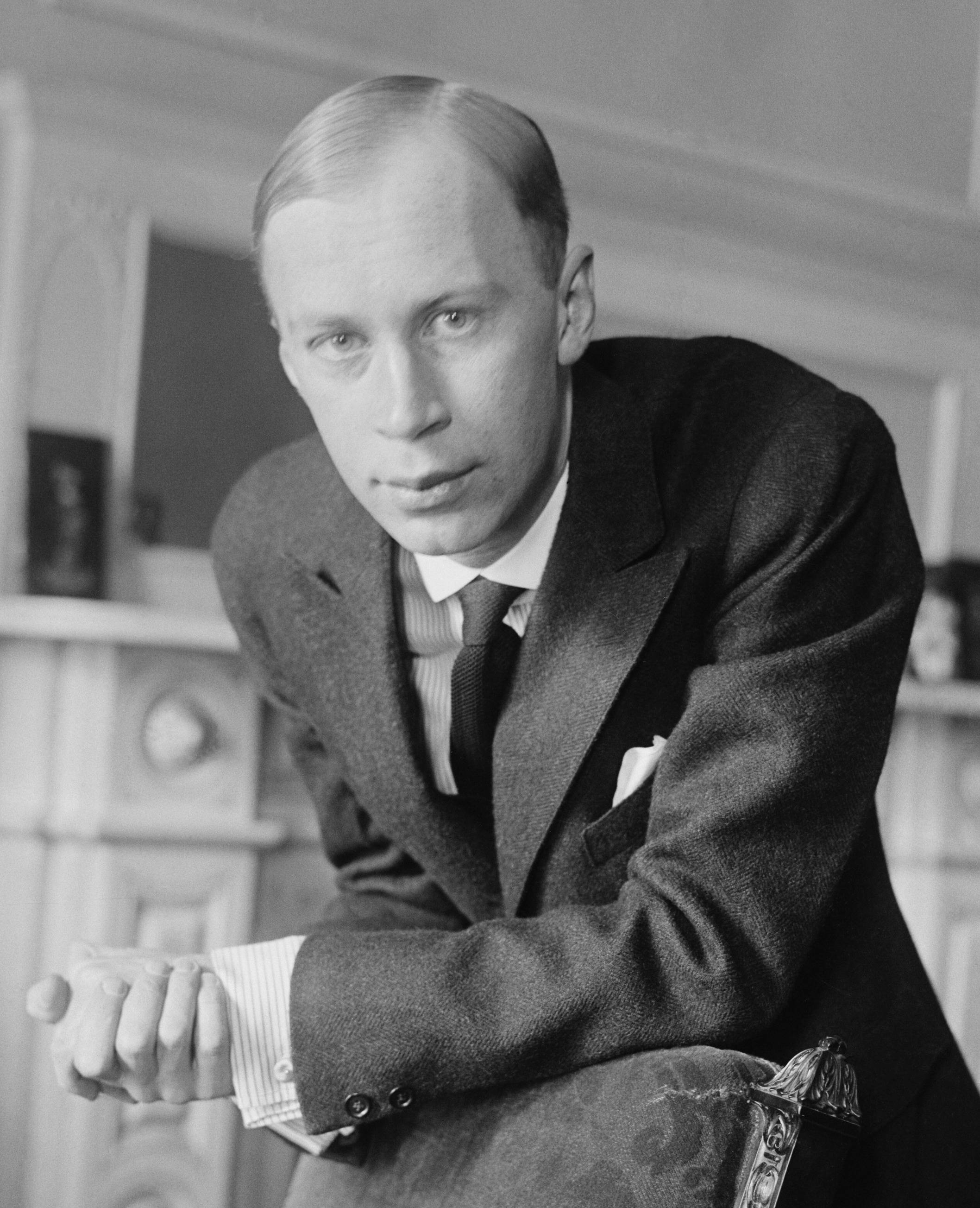
- Prokofiev, c. 1918
- Born: Sergei Sergeyevich Prokofiev; 27 April 1891; Sontsovka, Russian Empire (now in Ukraine)
- Died: 5 March 1953 (aged 61); Moscow, Soviet Union
- Education: Saint Petersburg Conservatory
- Occupations: Composer; pianist; conductor
- Works: List of compositions
- Spouses: Carolina Codina (m. 1921; sep. 1941) (Note: Marriage declared null and void in 1948.); Mira Mendelson (m. 1948)
- Children: 2, including Oleg

Sergei Sergeyevich Prokofiev (Note: /prəˈkɒfiɛf, proʊ-, -ˈkɔː-, -ˈkoʊ-, -jɛf, -jɛv, -iəf/; Russian: Сергей Сергеевич Прокофьев, romanized: Sergey Sergeyevich Prokofiev, IPA: [sʲɪˈrɡʲej sʲɪˈrɡʲe(j)ɪvʲɪtɕ prɐˈkofʲjɪf]; alternative transliterations of his name include Sergey or Serge, and Prokofief, Prokofieff, or Prokofyev. In this name that follows East Slavic naming customs, the patronymic is Sergeyevich and the family name is Prokofiev.) (27 April [O.S. 15 April] 1891 – 5 March 1953) (Note: While Prokofiev himself believed 11/23 April to be his birth date, the posthumous discovery of his birth certificate showed that he was actually born four days later, on 15/27 April.) was a Russian (Note: Attributed to the following sources:) composer, pianist, and conductor who later worked in the Soviet Union. As the creator of acknowledged masterpieces across numerous music genres, he is regarded as one of the major composers of the 20th century. His works include such widely heard pieces as the March from The Love for Three Oranges, the suite Lieutenant Kijé, the ballet Romeo and Juliet—from which "Dance of the Knights" is taken—and Peter and the Wolf. Of the established forms and genres in which he worked, he created—excluding juvenilia—seven completed operas, seven symphonies, eight ballets, five piano concertos, two violin concertos, a cello concerto, a symphony-concerto for cello and orchestra, and nine completed piano sonatas.

A graduate of the Saint Petersburg Conservatory, Prokofiev initially made his name as an iconoclastic composer-pianist, achieving notoriety with a series of ferociously dissonant and virtuosic works for his instrument, including his first two piano concertos. In 1915, Prokofiev made a decisive break from the standard composer-pianist category with his orchestral Scythian Suite, compiled from music originally composed for a ballet commissioned by Sergei Diaghilev of the Ballets Russes. Diaghilev commissioned three further ballets from Prokofiev—Chout, Le pas d'acier and The Prodigal Son—which, at the time of their original production, all caused a sensation among both critics and colleagues. But Prokofiev's greatest interest was opera, and he composed several works in that genre, including The Gambler and The Fiery Angel. Prokofiev's one operatic success during his lifetime was The Love for Three Oranges, composed for the Chicago Opera and performed over the following decade in Europe and Russia.

After the Revolution of 1917, Prokofiev left Russia with the approval of Soviet People's Commissar Anatoly Lunacharsky, and resided in the United States, then Germany, then Paris, making his living as a composer, pianist and conductor. In 1923 he married a Spanish singer, Carolina (Lina) Codina, with whom he had two sons; they divorced in 1947. In the early 1930s, the Great Depression diminished opportunities for Prokofiev's ballets and operas to be staged in America and Western Europe. Prokofiev, who regarded himself as a composer foremost, resented the time taken by touring as a pianist, and increasingly turned to the Soviet Union for commissions of new music; in 1936, he finally returned to his homeland with his family. His greatest Soviet successes included Lieutenant Kijé, Peter and the Wolf, Romeo and Juliet, Cinderella, Alexander Nevsky, the Fifth and Sixth Symphonies, On Guard for Peace, and the Piano Sonatas Nos. 6–8.

The Nazi invasion of the USSR spurred Prokofiev to compose his most ambitious work, an operatic version of Leo Tolstoy's War and Peace; he co-wrote the libretto with Mira Mendelson, his longtime companion and later second wife. In 1948, Prokofiev was attacked for producing "anti-democratic formalism". Nevertheless, he enjoyed personal and artistic support from a new generation of Russian performers, notably Sviatoslav Richter and Mstislav Rostropovich: he wrote his Ninth Piano Sonata for the former and his Symphony-Concerto for the latter.

== Life and career ==
=== Childhood and first compositions ===
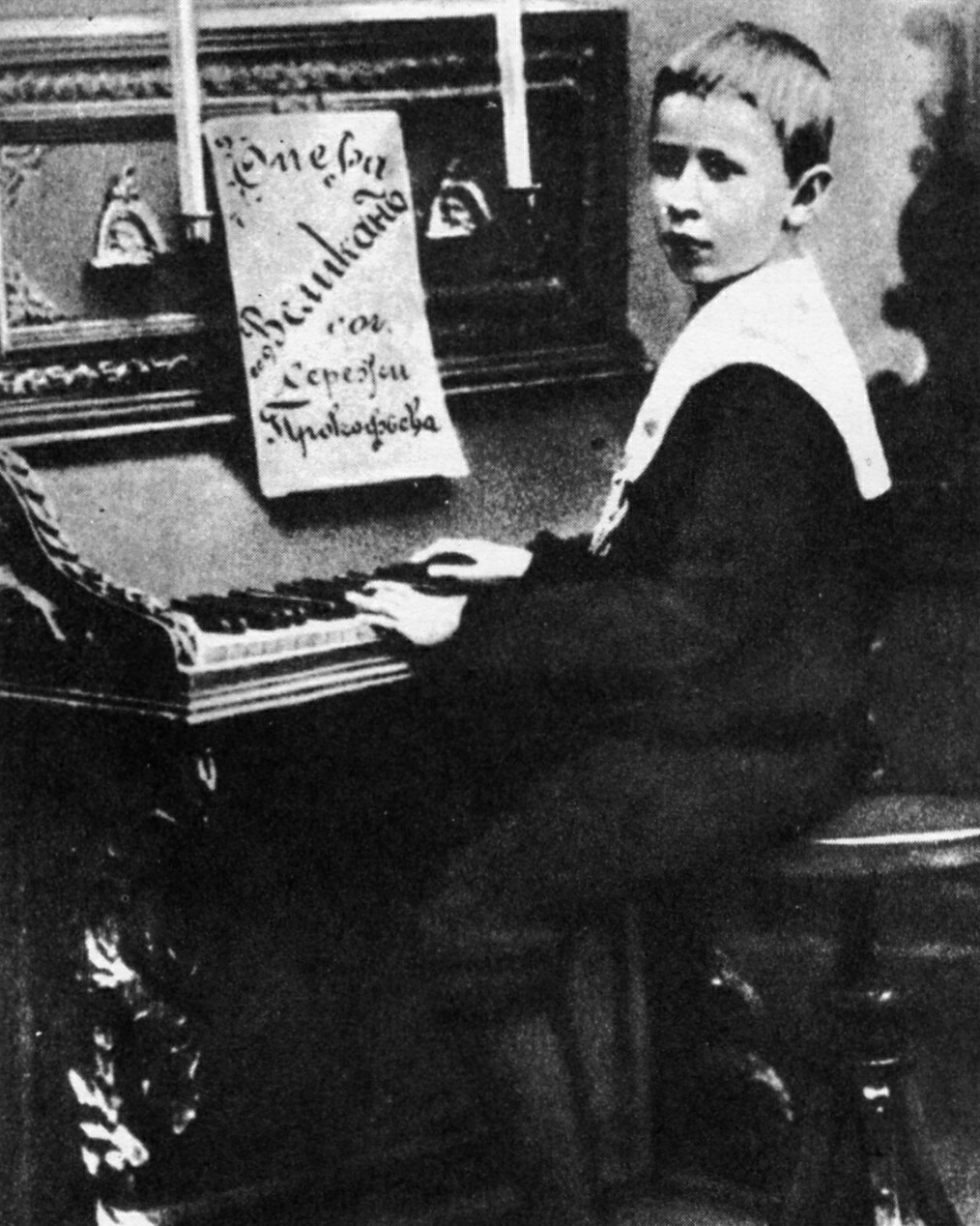
Prokofiev, aged 9, with the score of his opera The Giant

Sergei Sergeyevich Prokofiev was born on 27 April [O.S. 15 April] 1891 at a rural estate in Sontsovka, then part of Bakhmut uezd, Yekaterinoslav Governorate, Russian Empire, and now part of Ukraine. His father, Sergei Alekseyevich Prokofiev, was an agronomist from a mercantile family in Moscow. Prokofiev's mother, Maria (née Zhitkova), came from a Saint Petersburg family of former serfs who had been owned by the Sheremetev family, under whose patronage serf-children were taught theatre and arts from an early age. She was described by Reinhold Glière, Prokofiev's first composition teacher, as "a tall woman with beautiful, clever eyes … who knew how to create an atmosphere of warmth and simplicity about her." After their wedding in the summer of 1877, the Prokofievs moved to a small estate in the Smolensk governorate. Eventually, Sergei Alekseyevich found employment as a soil engineer, employed by one of his former fellow-students, Dmitri Sontsov, to whose estate in the Ukrainian steppes the Prokofievs moved.

By the time of Prokofiev's birth, Maria—having previously lost two daughters—had devoted her life to music; during her son's early childhood, she spent two months a year in Moscow or St Petersburg taking piano lessons. Sergei Prokofiev was inspired by hearing his mother practicing the piano in the evenings, mostly works by Chopin and Beethoven, and wrote his first piano composition at the age of five, an "Indian Gallop", which was written down by his mother: it was in the F Lydian mode (a major scale with a raised 4th scale degree), as the young Prokofiev felt "reluctance to tackle the black notes". By seven, he had also learned to play chess. Chess remained a passion of his, and he became acquainted with world chess champions José Raúl Capablanca, whom he beat in a simultaneous exhibition match in 1914, and Mikhail Botvinnik, with whom he played several matches in the 1930s. (Note: Prokofiev has the rare distinction for a composer of having won a game against a future world chess champion, albeit in the context of a simultaneous match: his win over Capablanca of 16 May 1914 can be played through at chessgames.com (Java required). For extracts from Prokofiev's notebooks recounting his games against Capablanca, see: The Game (part 2), sprkfv.net.) At the age of nine, he composed his first opera, The Giant, as well as an overture and various other pieces. Opera remained the genre Prokofiev was most fond of working in.

=== Education and early works ===
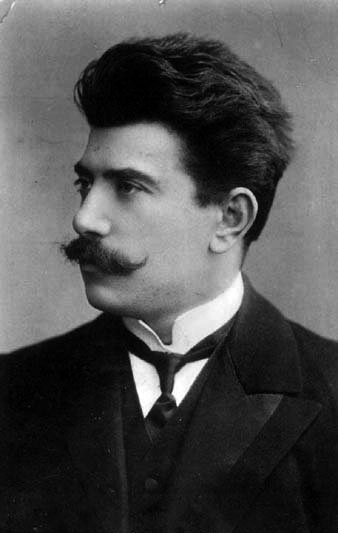
Composer Reinhold Glière, Prokofiev's first composition teacher

In 1902, Prokofiev's mother met Sergei Taneyev, director of the Moscow Conservatory, who initially suggested that Prokofiev should start lessons in piano and composition with Aleksandr Goldenweiser. Unable to arrange that, Taneyev instead arranged for composer and pianist Reinhold Glière to spend the summer of 1902 in Sontsovka teaching Prokofiev. The first series of lessons culminated, at the 11-year-old Prokofiev's insistence, with the budding composer making his first attempt to write a symphony. The following summer, Glière revisited Sontsovka to give further tuition. When, decades later, Prokofiev wrote about his lessons with Glière, he gave due credit to his teacher's sympathetic method but complained that Glière had introduced him to "square" phrase structure and conventional modulations, which he subsequently had to unlearn. Nonetheless, equipped with the necessary theoretical tools, Prokofiev started experimenting with dissonant harmonies and unusual time signatures in a series of short piano pieces he called "ditties" (after the so-called "song form", more accurately ternary form, on which they were based), laying the basis for his own musical style.

Despite his growing talent, Prokofiev's parents hesitated over starting their son on a musical career at such an early age, and considered the possibility of his attending a good high school in Moscow. By 1904, his mother had decided instead on Saint Petersburg, and she and Prokofiev visited the then capital to explore the possibility of moving there for his education. They were introduced to composer Alexander Glazunov, a professor at the Saint Petersburg Conservatory, who asked to see Prokofiev and his music; Prokofiev had composed two more operas, Desert Islands and The Feast during the Plague, and was working on his fourth, Undina. Glazunov was so impressed that he urged Prokofiev's mother to have her son apply for admission to the Conservatory. He passed the introductory tests and enrolled that year.

Several years younger than most of his class, Prokofiev was viewed as eccentric and arrogant and annoyed a number of his classmates by keeping statistics on their errors. During that period, he studied under, among others, Alexander Winkler for piano, Anatoly Lyadov for harmony and counterpoint, Nikolai Tcherepnin for conducting, and Nikolai Rimsky-Korsakov for orchestration (though when Rimsky-Korsakov died in 1908, Prokofiev noted that he had only studied with him "after a fashion"—he was just one of many students in a heavily attended class—and regretted that he otherwise "never had the opportunity to study with him"). He also shared classes with the composers Boris Asafyev and Nikolai Myaskovsky, the latter becoming a close and lifelong friend.

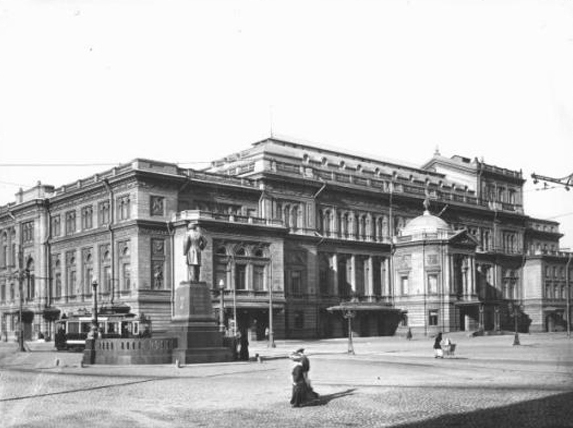
Saint Petersburg Conservatory in 1913

As a member of the Saint Petersburg music scene, Prokofiev developed a reputation as a musical rebel, while getting praise for his original compositions, which he performed himself on the piano. In 1909, he graduated from his class in composition with unremarkable marks. He continued at the Conservatory, studying piano under Anna Yesipova and continuing his conducting lessons under Tcherepnin.

In 1910, Prokofiev's father died and Sergei's financial support ceased. Fortunately, he had started making a name for himself as a composer and pianist outside the Conservatory, making appearances at the St Petersburg Evenings of Contemporary Music. There he performed several of his more adventurous piano works, such as his highly chromatic and dissonant Etudes, Op. 2 (1909). His performance of it impressed the organisers of the Evenings sufficiently for them to invite Prokofiev to give the Russian premiere of Arnold Schoenberg's Drei Klavierstücke, Op. 11. Prokofiev's harmonic experimentation continued with Sarcasms for piano, Op. 17 (1912), which makes extensive use of polytonality. He composed his first two piano concertos around then, the latter of which caused a scandal at its premiere (23 August 1913, Pavlovsk). According to one account, the audience left the hall with exclamations of "'To hell with this futuristic music! The cats on the roof make better music!'", but the modernists were in rapture.

In 1911, help arrived from renowned Russian musicologist and critic Alexander Ossovsky, who wrote a supportive letter to music publisher Boris P. Jurgenson (son of publishing-firm founder Peter Jurgenson [1836–1904]); thus a contract was offered to the composer. Prokofiev made his first foreign trip in 1913, travelling to Paris and London where he first encountered Sergei Diaghilev's Ballets Russes.

=== First ballets ===
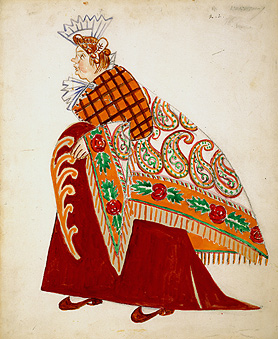
Sketch of the costume for the ballet Chout, 1916

In 1914, Prokofiev finished his career at the Conservatory by entering the 'battle of the pianos', a competition open to the five best piano students for which the prize was a Schroeder grand piano; Prokofiev won by performing his own Piano Concerto No. 1.

Soon afterwards, he journeyed to London where he made contact with the impresario Sergei Diaghilev. Diaghilev commissioned Prokofiev's first ballet, Ala and Lolli; but when Prokofiev brought the work in progress to him in Italy in 1915 he rejected it as "non-Russian". Urging Prokofiev to write "music that was national in character", Diaghilev then commissioned the ballet Chout ("The Buffoon"). (The original Russian-language full title was Сказка про шута, семерых шутов перешутившего, meaning "The Tale of the Buffoon who Outwits Seven Other Buffoons".) Under Diaghilev's guidance, Prokofiev chose his subject from a collection of folk tales by the ethnographer Alexander Afanasyev; the story, concerning a buffoon and a series of confidence tricks, had been previously suggested to Diaghilev by Igor Stravinsky as a possible subject for a ballet, and Diaghilev and his choreographer Léonide Massine helped Prokofiev to shape it into a ballet scenario. Prokofiev's inexperience with ballet led him to revise the work extensively in the 1920s, following Diaghilev's detailed critique, (Note: "Diaghilev pointed out a number of places which had to be rewritten. He was a subtle and discerning critic and he argued his point with great conviction. ... we had no difficulty in agreeing on the changes." Prokofiev 2000, p. 56) prior to its first production.

The ballet's premiere in Paris on 17 May 1921 was a huge success and was greeted with great admiration by an audience that included Jean Cocteau, Igor Stravinsky and Maurice Ravel. Stravinsky called the ballet "the single piece of modern music he could listen to with pleasure", while Ravel called it "a work of genius".

=== First World War and Revolution ===
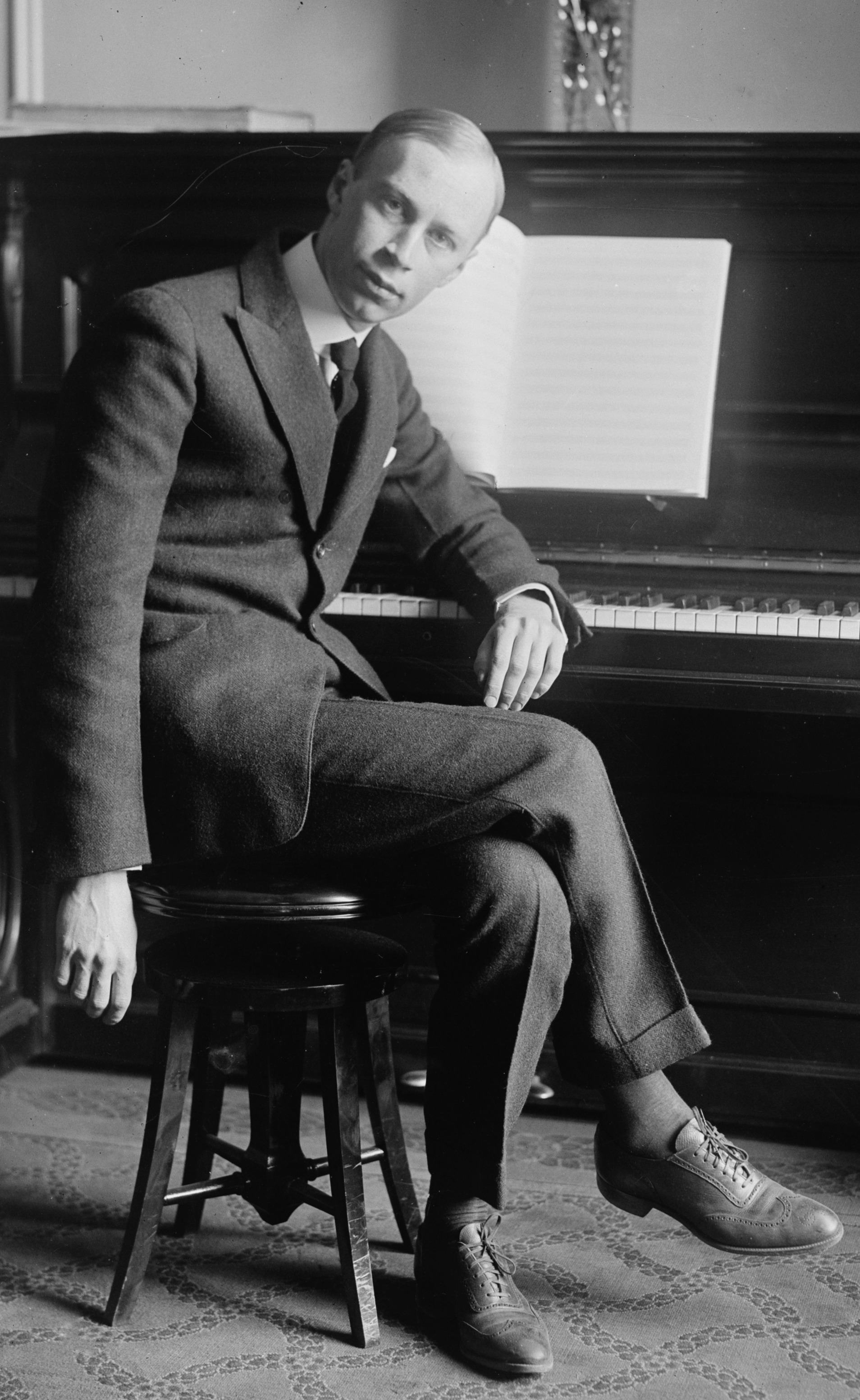
Prokofiev c. 1918

During World War I, Prokofiev returned to the Conservatory and studied organ to avoid conscription. In 1916, he debuted his Toccata. Shortly after this he composed The Gambler based on Fyodor Dostoyevsky's novel of the same name, but rehearsals were plagued by problems, and the scheduled 1917 première had to be cancelled because of the February Revolution. In the summer of that year, Prokofiev composed his first symphony, the Classical. The name was Prokofiev's own; the music is in a style that, according to Prokofiev, Joseph Haydn would have used if he were alive at the time. The music is more or less Classical in style but incorporates more modern musical elements (see Neoclassicism).

The symphony was also an exact contemporary of Prokofiev's Violin Concerto No. 1 in D major, Op. 19, which was scheduled to premiere in November 1917. The first performances of both works had to wait until 21 April 1918 and 18 October 1923, respectively. Prokofiev stayed briefly with his mother in Kislovodsk in the Caucasus.

After completing the score of Seven, They Are Seven, a "Chaldean invocation" for chorus and orchestra, Prokofiev was "left with nothing to do and time hung heavily on [his] hands". Believing that Russia "had no use for music at the moment", Prokofiev decided to try his fortunes in America until the turmoil in his homeland had passed. He set out for Moscow and Petersburg in March 1918 to sort out financial matters and to arrange for his passport. In May, he headed for the US, having obtained official permission to do so from Anatoly Lunacharsky, the People's Commissar for Education, who told him: "You are a revolutionary in music, we are revolutionaries in life. We ought to work together. But if you want to go to America I shall not stand in your way."

=== Life abroad ===
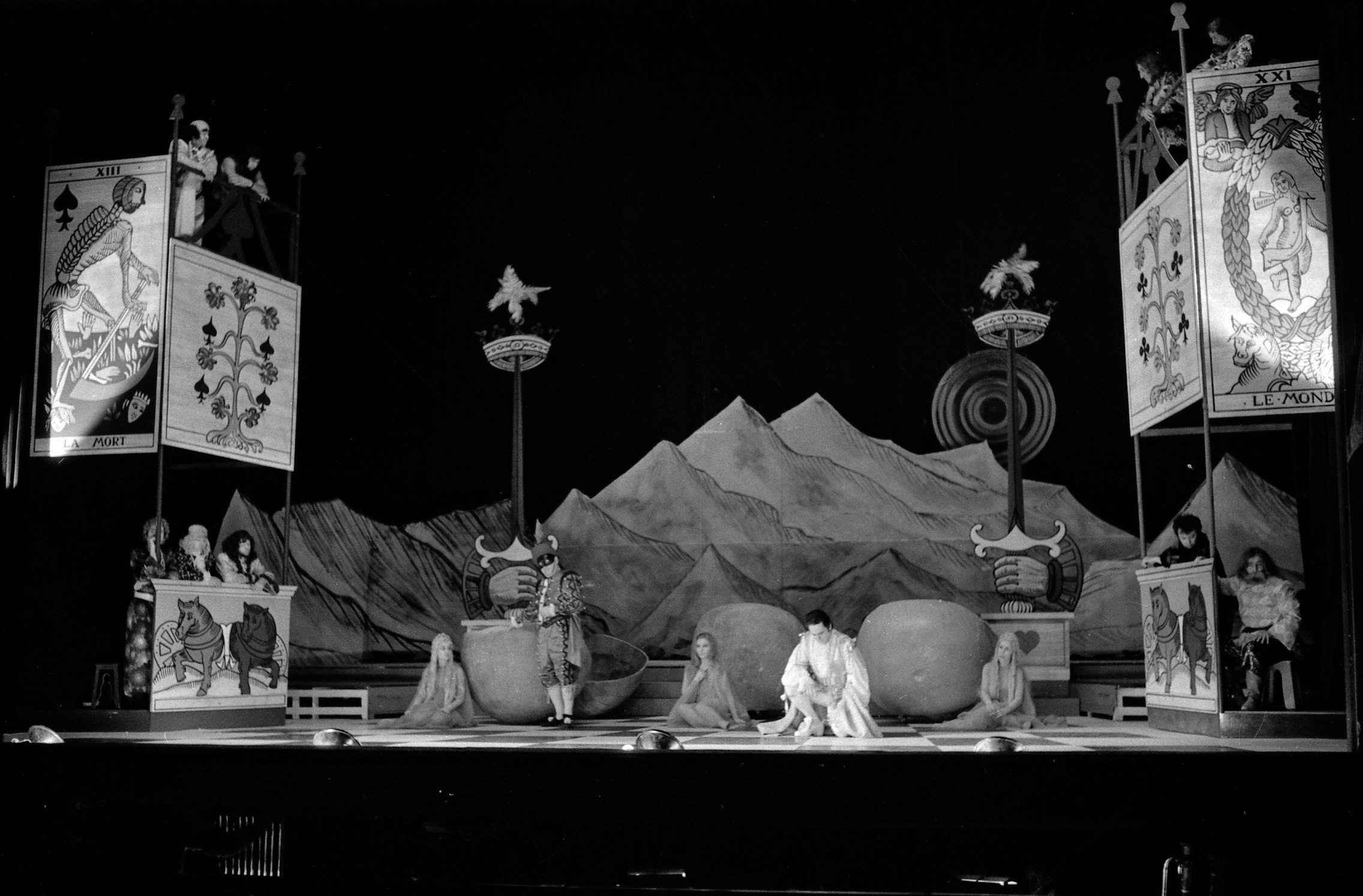
Prokofiev's opera The Love for Three Oranges at the Théâtre du Capitole, 1971

Arriving in San Francisco after having been released from questioning by immigration officials on Angel Island on 11 August 1918, Prokofiev was soon compared to other famous Russian exiles, such as Sergei Rachmaninoff. His debut solo concert in New York led to several further engagements. He also received a contract from the music director of the Chicago Opera Association, Cleofonte Campanini, for the production of his new opera The Love for Three Oranges, but due to Campanini's illness and death, the premiere was postponed. The delay was another example of Prokofiev's bad luck in operatic matters. The failure also cost him his American solo career since the opera took too much time and effort. He soon found himself in financial difficulties, and in April 1920, he left for Paris, not wanting to return to Russia as a failure.

In Paris, Prokofiev reaffirmed his contacts with Diaghilev's Ballets Russes. He also completed some of his older, unfinished works, such as his Third Piano Concerto. The Love for Three Oranges finally premièred in Chicago, under the composer's baton, on 30 December 1921. Diaghilev became sufficiently interested in the opera to request Prokofiev play the vocal score to him in June 1922, while they were both in Paris for a revival of Chout, so he could consider it for a possible production. Stravinsky, who was present at the audition, refused to listen to more than the first act. When he then accused Prokofiev of "wasting time composing operas", Prokofiev retorted that Stravinsky "was in no position to lay down a general artistic direction, since he is himself not immune to error". According to Prokofiev, Stravinsky "became incandescent with rage" and "we almost came to blows and were separated only with difficulty". As a result, "our relations became strained and for several years Stravinsky's attitude toward me was critical."

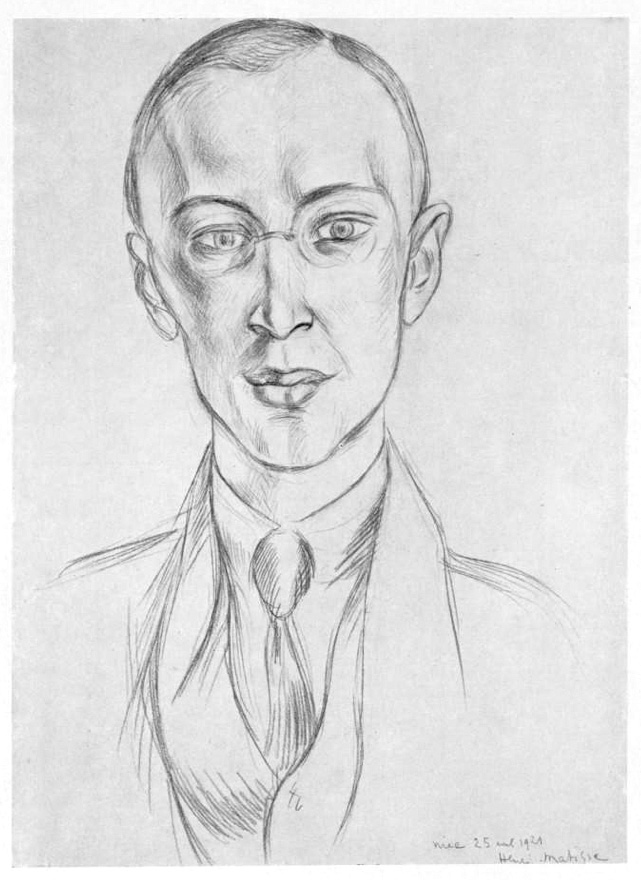
Prokofiev, as drawn by Henri Matisse for the premiere of Chout (1921)

In March 1922, Prokofiev moved with his mother to the town of Ettal in the Bavarian Alps, where for over a year he concentrated on an opera project, The Fiery Angel, based on the novel by Valery Bryusov. His later music had acquired a following in Russia, and he received invitations to return there, but decided to stay in Western Europe. In 1923, Prokofiev married the Spanish singer Carolina Codina (1897–1989, stage name Lina Llubera) before moving back to Paris.

In Paris, several of his works, including the Second Symphony, were performed, but their reception was lukewarm and Prokofiev sensed that he "was evidently no longer a sensation". Still, the Symphony appeared to prompt Diaghilev to commission Le pas d'acier (The Steel Step), a "modernist" ballet score intended to portray the industrialisation of the Soviet Union. It was enthusiastically received by Parisian audiences and critics.

Around 1924, Prokofiev was introduced to Christian Science. He began to practice its teachings, which he believed to be beneficial to his health and to his fiery temperament and to which he remained faithful for the rest of his life, according to biographer Simon Morrison.

Prokofiev and Stravinsky restored their friendship, though Prokofiev particularly disliked Stravinsky's "stylization of Bach" in such recent works as the Octet and the Concerto for Piano and Wind Instruments. (Note: It has been suggested that Prokofiev's use of text from Stravinsky's Symphony of Psalms to characterise the invading Teutonic knights in the film score for Eisenstein's Alexander Nevsky (1938) was intended as a dig at Stravinsky's "pseudo-Bachism".) For his part, Stravinsky described Prokofiev as the greatest Russian composer of his day, after himself.

=== First visits to the Soviet Union ===
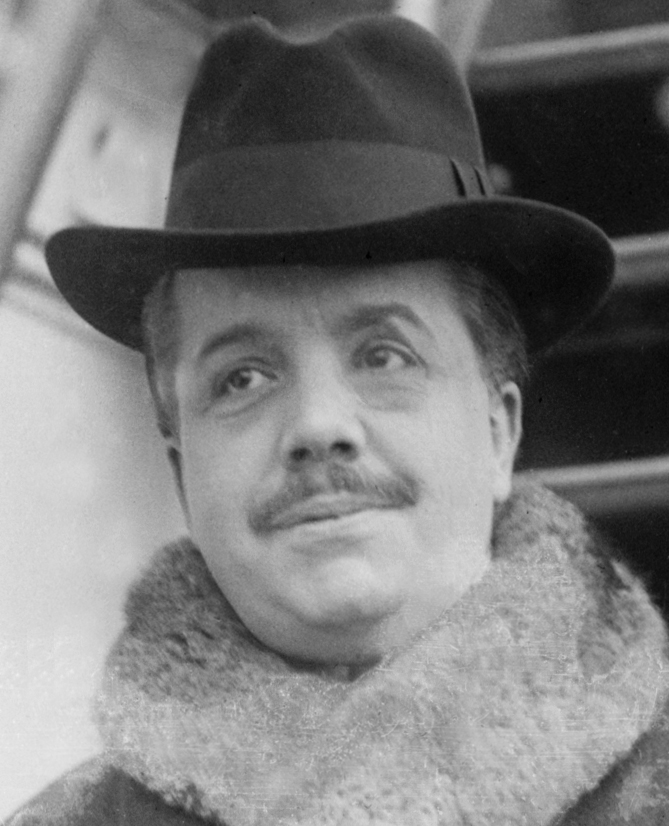
Sergei Diaghilev in 1916

Prokofiev met Boris Krasin in the violinist Joseph Szigeti's Paris apartment in 1924. In 1927, Prokofiev made his first concert tour in the Soviet Union. Over more than two months, he spent time in Moscow and Leningrad (as St Petersburg had been renamed), where he enjoyed a very successful staging of The Love for Three Oranges in the Mariinsky Theatre. In 1928, Prokofiev completed his Third Symphony, which was broadly based on his unperformed opera The Fiery Angel. The conductor Serge Koussevitzky characterized the Third as "the greatest symphony since Tchaikovsky's Sixth".

In the meantime, under the influence of the teachings of Christian Science, Prokofiev had turned against the expressionist style and the subject matter of The Fiery Angel. (Note: Quote: "I decided a long time ago that I must compose in a quite different style, and that I would set about it as soon as I had extricated myself from the revisions of Fiery Angel and The Gambler. If God is the unique source of creation and of reason, and man is his reflection, it is abundantly clear that the works of man will be better the more closely they reflect the works of the Creator". Prokofiev 2012, p. 699) He now preferred what he called a "new simplicity", which he found more sincere than the "contrivances and complexities" of so much modern music of the 1920s. (Note: That is not to say that Prokofiev approved of simplistic music: when in June 1926 he arranged "a simplified version of the March from Oranges as a crowd-pleaser", Prokofiev observed in his diary, "The process of denuding for the sake of simplicity is highly disagreeable".) In 1928–29, Prokofiev composed his last ballet for Diaghilev, The Prodigal Son. When first staged in Paris on 21 May 1929, choreographed by George Balanchine with Serge Lifar in the title role, the audience and critics were particularly struck by the final scene, in which the prodigal son drags himself across the stage on his knees to be welcomed by his father. Diaghilev had recognised that in the music to the scene, Prokofiev had "never been more clear, more simple, more melodious, and more tender". Only months later, Diaghilev died.

That summer, Prokofiev completed the Divertimento, Op. 43 (which he had started in 1925) and revised his Sinfonietta, Op. 5/48, a work started in his days at the Conservatory. (Note: Prokofiev wrote in his autobiography that he could never understand why the Sinfonietta was so rarely performed, whereas the "Classical" Symphony was played everywhere.) In October of that year, he had a car crash while driving his family back to Paris from their holiday: as the car turned over, Prokofiev pulled some muscles on his left hand. Prokofiev was therefore unable to perform in Moscow during his tour shortly after the accident, but he was able to enjoy watching performances of his music from the audience. Prokofiev also attended the Bolshoi Theatre's "audition" of his ballet Le pas d'acier, and was interrogated by members of the Russian Association of Proletarian Musicians (RAPM) about the work: he was asked whether the factory portrayed "a capitalist factory, where the worker is a slave, or a Soviet factory, where the worker is the master? If it is a Soviet factory, when and where did Prokofiev examine it, since from 1918 to the present he has been living abroad and came here for the first time in 1927 for two weeks [sic]?" Prokofiev replied, "That concerns politics, not music, and therefore I won't answer." The RAPM condemned the ballet as a "flat and vulgar anti-Soviet anecdote, a counter-revolutionary composition bordering on Fascism". The Bolshoi had no option but to reject the ballet.

With his left hand healed, Prokofiev toured the United States successfully at the start of 1930, propped up by his recent European success. That year, Prokofiev began his first non-Diaghilev ballet On the Dnieper, Op. 51, a work commissioned by Serge Lifar, who had been appointed maitre de ballet at the Paris Opéra. In 1931 and 1932, he completed his fourth and fifth piano concertos. The following year saw the completion of the Symphonic Song, Op. 57, which Prokofiev's friend Myaskovsky—thinking of its potential audience in the Soviet Union—told him "isn't quite for us… it lacks that which we mean by monumentalism—a familiar simplicity and broad contours, of which you are extremely capable, but temporarily are carefully avoiding."

By the early 1930s, both Europe and America were suffering from the Great Depression, which inhibited both new opera and ballet productions, though audiences for Prokofiev's appearances as a pianist were, in Europe at least, undiminished. But Prokofiev saw himself as a composer first and foremost, and increasingly resented the time lost to composition through his appearances as a pianist. Having been homesick for some time, Prokofiev began to build substantial bridges with the Soviet Union.

Following the dissolution of the RAPM in 1932, he acted increasingly as a musical ambassador between his homeland and western Europe, and his premieres and commissions were increasingly under the auspices of the Soviet Union. One such was Lieutenant Kijé, which was commissioned as the score to a Soviet film.

Another commission, from the Kirov Theatre (as the Mariinsky had now been renamed) in Leningrad, was the ballet Romeo and Juliet, composed to a scenario created by Adrian Piotrovsky and Sergei Radlov following the precepts of "drambalet" (dramatised ballet, officially promoted at the Kirov to replace works based primarily on choreographic display and innovation). Following Radlov's acrimonious resignation from the Kirov in June 1934, a new agreement was signed with the Bolshoi Theatre in Moscow on the understanding that Piotrovsky would remain involved. But the ballet's original happy ending (contrary to Shakespeare) provoked controversy among Soviet cultural officials, and the ballet's production was postponed indefinitely when the staff of the Bolshoi was overhauled at the behest of the chairman of the Committee on Arts Affairs, Platon Kerzhentsev.

=== Return to Russia ===
Video of performance of "Song about Alexander Nevsky", Section 2 of Alexander Nevsky cantata. Length: 2 min, 56 sec

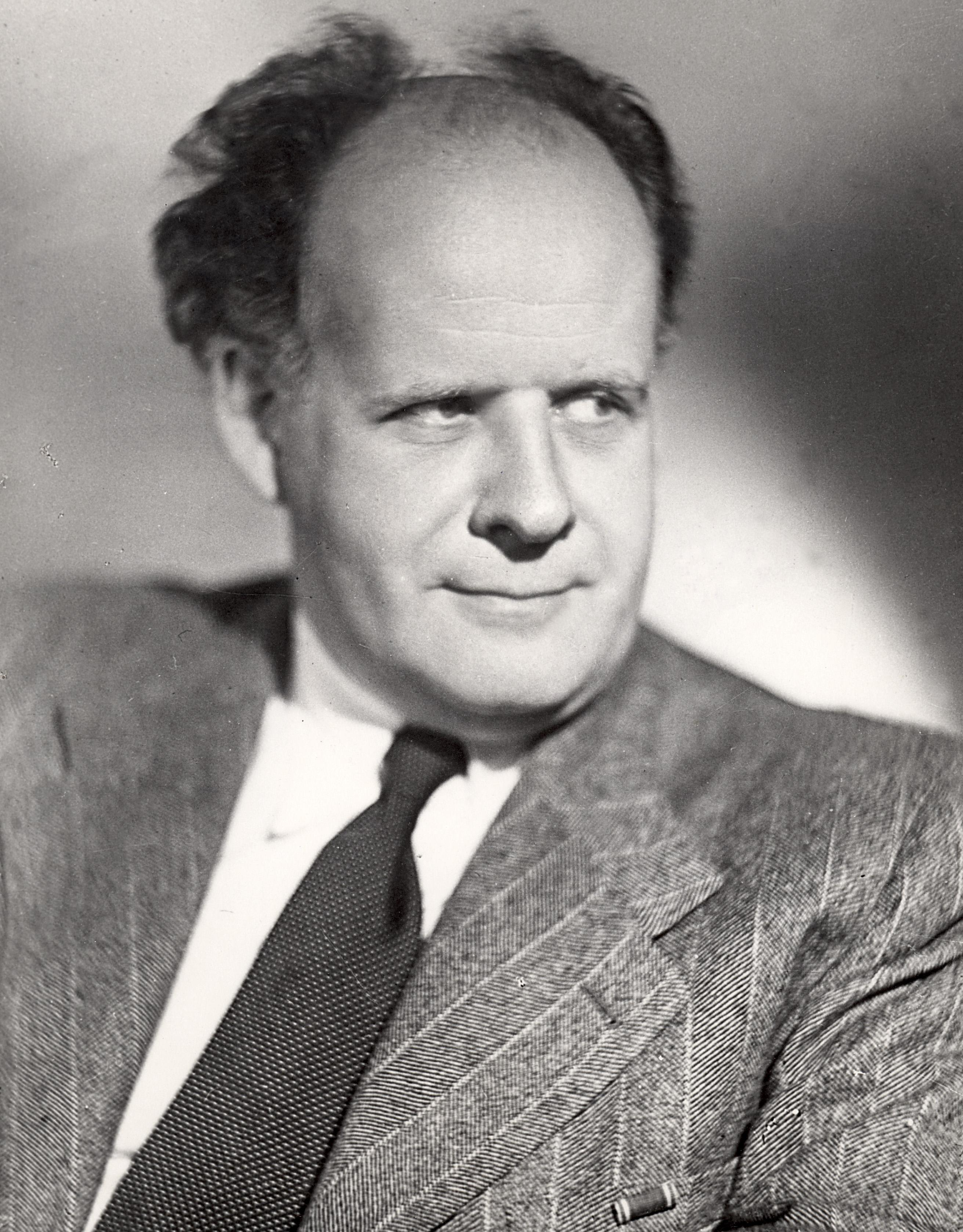
Prokofiev wrote the scores for two films by director Sergei Eisenstein: Alexander Nevsky (1938) and Ivan the Terrible (1945).

In 1936, Prokofiev and his family settled permanently in Moscow, after shifting back and forth between Moscow and Paris for the previous four years.

That year, Prokofiev composed one of his most famous works, Peter and the Wolf, for Natalya Sats' Central Children's Theatre. Sats also persuaded him to write two songs for children, "Sweet Song", and "Chatterbox"; they were eventually joined by "The Little Pigs" and published as Three Children's Songs, Op. 68. Prokofiev also composed the gigantic Cantata for the 20th Anniversary of the October Revolution, originally intended for performance during the anniversary year but effectively blocked by Kerzhentsev, who demanded at the work's audition before the Committee on Arts Affairs, "Just what do you think you're doing, Sergey Sergeyevich, taking texts that belong to the people and setting them to such incomprehensible music?" The Cantata was not performed until 5 April 1966, just over 13 years after the composer's death.

Forced to adapt to the new circumstances (whatever private misgivings he had about them), Prokofiev wrote a series of "mass songs" (Opp. 66, 79, 89), using the lyrics of officially approved Soviet poets. In 1938, he collaborated with Eisenstein on the historical epic Alexander Nevsky, composing some of his most inventive and dramatic music. Although the film had very poor sound recording, Prokofiev adapted much of his score into a large-scale cantata for mezzo-soprano, orchestra and chorus, which was extensively performed and recorded. In the wake of Alexander Nevsky's success, Prokofiev composed his first Soviet opera, Semyon Kotko, which was intended to be produced by the director Vsevolod Meyerhold. The opera's première was postponed because Meyerhold was arrested on 20 June 1939 by the NKVD, and shot on 2 February 1940. At the end of the same year, Prokofiev was commissioned to compose Zdravitsa (literally "Cheers!", but sometimes subtitled Hail to Stalin in English) (Op. 85) to celebrate Joseph Stalin's 60th birthday.

Starting in 1939, Prokofiev composed his Piano Sonatas Nos. 6, 7, and 8, Opp. 82–84, widely known today as the "War Sonatas". Premiered respectively by Prokofiev (No. 6: 8 April 1940), Sviatoslav Richter (No. 7: Moscow, 18 January 1943) and Emil Gilels (No. 8: Moscow, 30 December 1944), they were subsequently championed in particular by Richter. Biographer Daniel Jaffé argued that Prokofiev, "having forced himself to compose a cheerful evocation of the nirvana Stalin wanted everyone to believe he had created" (i.e., in Zdravitsa) then subsequently, in the three sonatas, "expressed his true feelings". As evidence, Jaffé has pointed out that the central movement of Sonata No. 7 opens with a theme based on the Robert Schumann lied "Wehmut" ("Sadness", from the Liederkreis, Op. 39): its words translate, "I can sometimes sing as if I were glad, yet secretly tears well and so free my heart. Nightingales … sing their song of longing from their dungeon's depth … everyone delights, yet no one feels the pain, the deep sorrow in the song." Sonata No. 7 received a Stalin Prize (Second Class) and No. 8 a Stalin Prize (First Class).

Meanwhile, Romeo and Juliet was staged by the Kirov Ballet, choreographed by Leonid Lavrovsky, on 11 January 1940. To the surprise of all of its participants, the dancers having struggled to cope with the music's syncopated rhythms and almost having boycotted the production, the ballet was an instant success and became recognised as the crowning achievement of Soviet dramatic ballet.

=== War years ===
Prokofiev had been considering making an opera out of Leo Tolstoy's epic novel War and Peace, when news of the German invasion of the Soviet Union on 22 June 1941 made the subject seem all the more timely. Because of the war, he was evacuated together with a large number of other artists, initially to the Georgian SSR, where he lived in Tbilisi from 11 November 1941 until 29 June 1942. While there he began to compose the original version of War and Peace. While in the Georgian SSR he also composed his Second String Quartet and Piano Sonata No. 7. His relationship with the 25-year-old writer and librettist Mira Mendelson had finally led to his separation from his wife Lina. Despite their acrimonious separation, Prokofiev tried to persuade Lina and their sons to accompany him as evacuees out of Moscow, but Lina opted to stay.

During the war years, restrictions on style and the demand that composers write in a 'socialist realist' style were slackened, and Prokofiev was generally able to compose in his own way. The Violin Sonata No. 1, Op. 80, The Year 1941, Op. 90, and the Ballade for the Boy Who Remained Unknown, Op. 93 all came from this period. In 1943, Prokofiev joined Eisenstein in Alma-Ata, the largest city in Kazakhstan, to compose more film music (Ivan the Terrible), and the ballet Cinderella (Op. 87), one of his most melodious and celebrated compositions. Early that year, he also played excerpts from War and Peace to members of the Bolshoi Theatre collective, but the Soviet government had opinions about the opera that resulted in many revisions. (Note: "Prokofiev wrote the first version of War and Peace during the Second World War. He revised it in the late forties and early fifties, during the period of the 1948 Zhdanov Decree, which attacked obscurantist tendencies in the music of leading Soviet composers." "Prokofiev's War and Peace" by Alex Ross, The New Yorker, 4 March 2002, via Ross's blog.) In 1944, Prokofiev composed his Fifth Symphony (Op. 100) at a composer's colony outside Moscow. He conducted its first performance on 13 January 1945, just a fortnight after the triumphant premieres on 30 December 1944 of his Eighth Piano Sonata and, on the same day, the first part of Eisenstein's Ivan the Terrible. With the premiere of his Fifth Symphony, which was programmed alongside Peter and the Wolf and the Classical Symphony (conducted by Nikolai Anosov), Prokofiev appeared to reach the peak of his celebrity as a leading Soviet composer.

On 20 January 1945, Prokofiev suffered a concussion after fainting in his apartment due to untreated chronic hypertension. The composer Dmitry Kabalevsky visited him in hospital and found him semi-conscious, and "with a heavy heart, I left him, I thought it was the end." He never fully recovered from the injury, and, following medical advice, restricted his composing activity.

=== Postwar ===
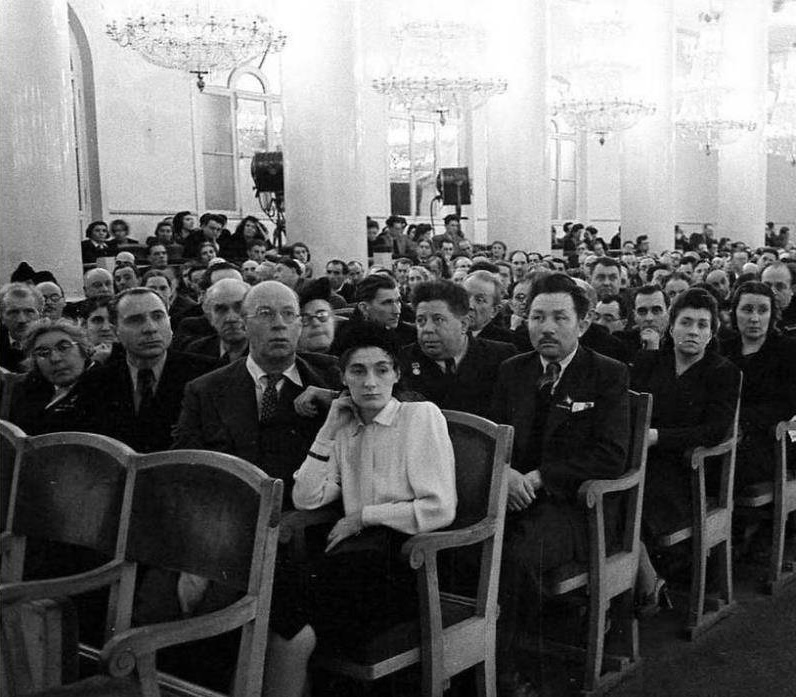
Sergei Prokofiev and his wife (front center) at the inauguration for the First All-Union Congress of Composers at the House of the Unions; 1 April 1948

Prokofiev had time to write his postwar Sixth Symphony and his Ninth Piano Sonata (for Sviatoslav Richter) before the so-called "Zhdanov Doctrine". On the day before the decree was published, 10 February 1948, Prokofiev was at a ceremony in the Kremlin to mark his elevation to the status of People's Artist of the RSFSR.

The decree followed a three-day conference of more than 70 composers, musicians and music lecturers convened on 10 January, presided over by Zhdanov. Prokofiev was berated by a minor composer, Viktor Bely, who accused him of "innovation for innovation's sake" and "artistic snobbishness", but unlike Dmitri Shostakovich, Aram Khachaturian and others, Prokofiev gave no speech. His silence set off rumors that he had been deliberately defiant and uncooperative. There is no official record, but according to a variety of witnesses, Prokofiev did not attend on the first day, and had to be fetched, arriving on day two wearing a brown suit and baggy-kneed trousers tucked into his felt boots. Ilya Ehrenburg, who was not in the hall, claimed in his memoirs that Prokofiev fell asleep, woke up suddenly and loudly asked who Zhdanov was. The cellist Mstislav Rostropovich heard that Prokofiev was chatting to the person next to him when a senior figure sitting nearby warned him to be quiet. Prokofiev asked: "Who are you?" The official said that his name did not matter, but that Prokofiev had better pay attention to him, to which Prokofiev retorted: "I never pay attention to comments from people who haven't been introduced to me." This possibly apocryphal story was corroborated by the head of the composers' union, Tikhon Khrennikov, who said that the person Prokofiev snubbed was the Stalinist official Matvei Shkiryatov.

The decree, published on 11 February, denounced six artists—Shostakovich, Prokofiev, Khachaturian, Shebalin, Popov, and Myaskovsky, in that order—for the crime of "formalism", described as a "renunciation of the basic principles of classical music" in favor of "muddled, nerve-racking" sounds that "turned music into cacophony". Eight of Prokofiev's works were banned from performance: The Year 1941, Ode to the End of the War, Festive Poem, Cantata for the Thirtieth Anniversary of October, Ballad of an Unknown Boy, the 1934 piano cycle Thoughts, and Piano Sonatas Nos. 6 and 8. Such was the perceived threat behind the banning of the works that even works that had avoided censure were no longer programmed. By August 1948, Prokofiev was in severe financial straits, his personal debt amounting to 180,000 rubles.

On 22 November 1947, Prokofiev filed a petition in court to begin divorce proceedings against his estranged wife. Five days later the court ruled that the marriage had no legal basis since it had taken place in Germany, and had not been registered with Soviet officials, thus making it null and void. After a second judge upheld the verdict, he and his partner Mira wed on 13 January 1948. On 20 February 1948, Prokofiev's first wife Lina was arrested and charged with espionage for trying to send money to her mother in Spain. After nine months of interrogation, she was sentenced by a three-member Military Collegium of the Supreme Court of the USSR to 20 years of hard labor. She was released eight years later on 30 June 1956 and in 1974 left the Soviet Union.

Prokofiev's latest opera projects, among them his desperate attempt to appease the cultural authorities, The Story of a Real Man, were quickly cancelled by the Kirov Theatre. The snub, in combination with his declining health, caused Prokofiev to progressively withdraw from public life and from various activities, even chess, and increasingly devote himself to his own work. After he had a stroke on 7 July 1949, his doctors ordered him to limit his composing to an hour a day.

In spring 1949, Prokofiev wrote his Cello Sonata in C major, Op. 119, for the 22-year-old Mstislav Rostropovich, who gave the first performance in 1950, with Sviatoslav Richter. For Rostropovich, Prokofiev also extensively recomposed his Cello Concerto, transforming it into a Symphony-Concerto, a landmark in the cello and orchestra repertory today. The last public performance he attended, on 11 October 1952, was the première of the Seventh Symphony, his last completed work. The symphony was written for the Children's Radio Division.

=== Death ===
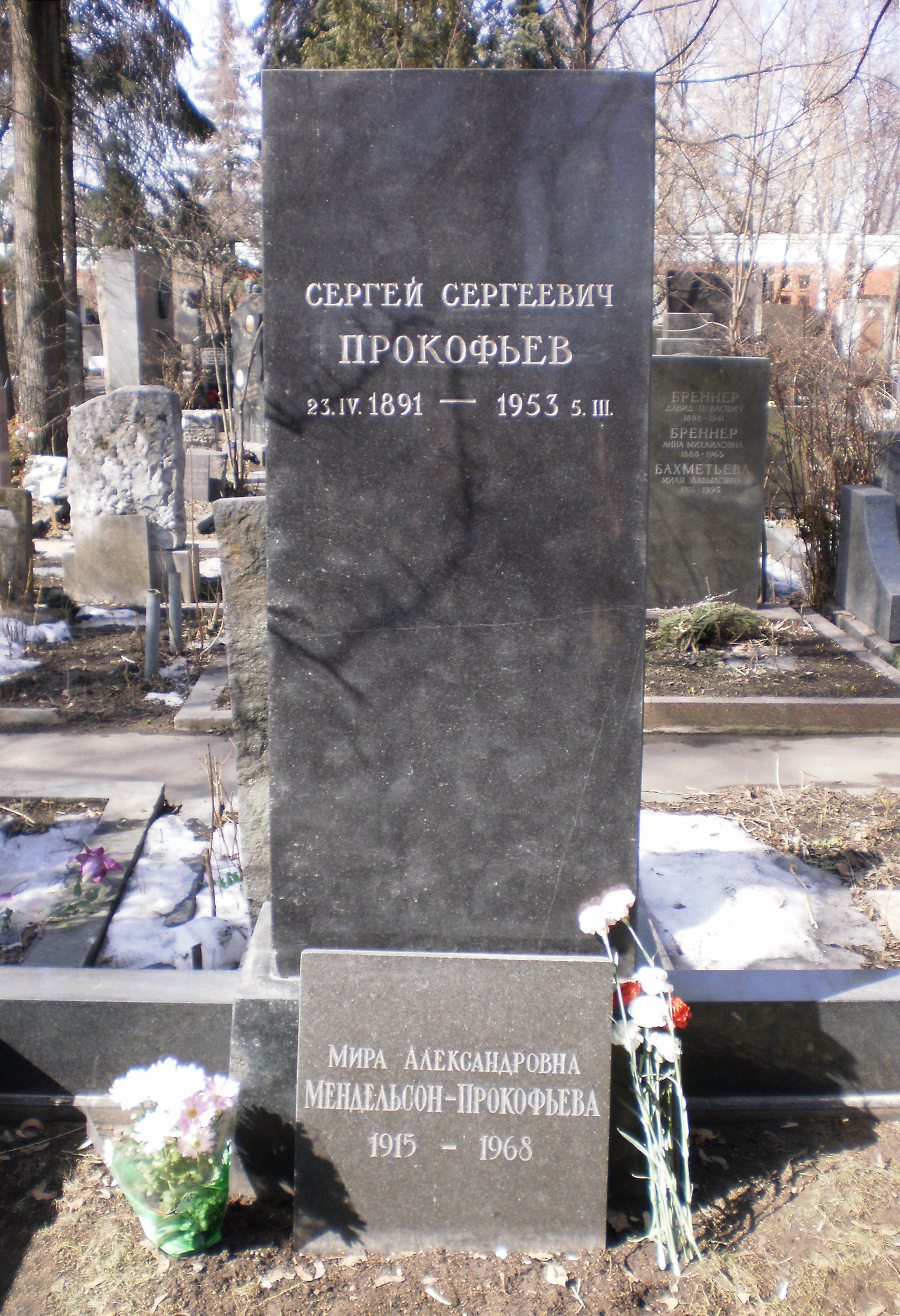
Prokofiev's grave in Novodevichy Cemetery. His wife Mira's gravestone is at the bottom.

Prokofiev died of hypertensive crisis at age 61 on 5 March 1953, the same day as Joseph Stalin. He had lived in a communal apartment on Chamberlain Lane next to the Red Square, and for three days throngs gathered to mourn Stalin, making it impossible to hold Prokofiev's funeral service at the headquarters of the Soviet Composers' Union. Because the hearse was not allowed near Prokofiev's house, his coffin had to be moved by hand through back streets in the opposite direction of the masses of people going to visit Stalin's body. About 30 people attended the funeral, Shostakovich among them. Although they had not seemed to get along when they met, in the later years their interactions had become far more amicable, with Shostakovich writing to Prokofiev, "I wish you at least another hundred years to live and create. Listening to such works as your Seventh Symphony makes it much easier and more joyful to live." Prokofiev is buried in Moscow's Novodevichy Cemetery.

The leading Soviet musical periodical reported Prokofiev's death as a brief item on page 116 (the first 115 pages were devoted to Stalin's death). Prokofiev's death is usually attributed to cerebral hemorrhage. He had been chronically ill for eight years.

Prokofiev's wife Mira Mendelson spent her final years living in the Moscow apartment they had shared. She occupied her time organizing her husband's papers, promoting his music, and writing her memoirs, having been strongly encouraged by Prokofiev to embark on the latter. Work on the memoirs was difficult for her; she left them incomplete at her death. Mendelson died of a heart attack in Moscow in 1968, 15 years after Prokofiev. Inside her purse a message dated February 1950 and signed by Prokofiev and Mendelson instructed: "We wish to be buried next to each other." Their remains are buried together at Novodevichy Cemetery.

Lina Prokofiev outlived her ex-husband by many years, dying in London in early 1989. Royalties from his music provided her with a modest income, and she acted as storyteller for a recording of her husband's Peter and the Wolf (released on CD by Chandos Records) with Neeme Järvi conducting the Scottish National Orchestra. Their sons Sviatoslav (1924–2010), an architect, and Oleg (1928–1998), an artist, painter, sculptor and poet, dedicated much of their lives to promoting their father's work.

== Legacy ==
=== Reputation ===
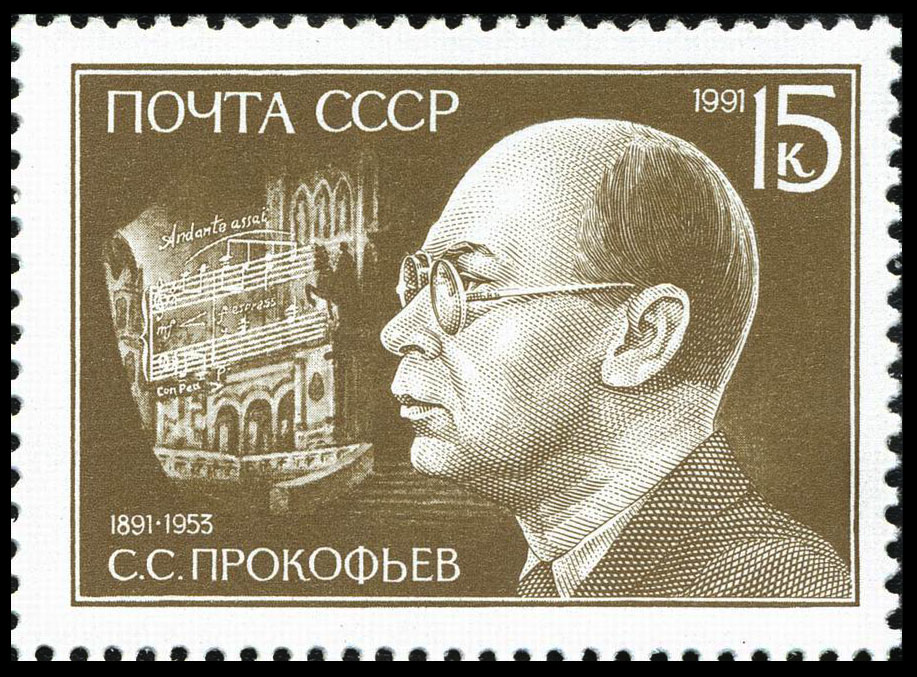
A Soviet stamp marking Prokofiev's centenary in 1991

Arthur Honegger said that Prokofiev would "remain for us the greatest figure of contemporary music", and the American scholar Richard Taruskin wrote of Prokofiev's "gift, virtually unparalleled among 20th-century composers, for writing distinctively original diatonic melodies". Yet for some time Prokofiev's reputation in the West suffered as a result of Cold War antipathies, and his music has never won from Western academics and critics the same esteem as Igor Stravinsky's and Arnold Schoenberg's, which had greater influence on younger musicians. Nonetheless, his unique approach to composition (which he reflected on significantly in autobiographical writings) continues to receive steady musicological examination.

In Donetsk Oblast, the Donetsk State Music Academy Named After Sergei Prokofiev and Donetsk Sergei Prokofiev International Airport are named in Prokofiev's honor. The latter facility was destroyed in 2014 during the First and Second Battle of Donetsk Airport.

The All-Ukrainian open musical competition named after Prokofiev is held annually in Kyiv and comprises three categories: piano, composition, and conducting.

=== Recordings ===
Overture on Hebrew Themes
Overture on Hebrew Themes (1919), performed by members of the Advent Chamber Orchestra

Prokofiev was a soloist with the London Symphony Orchestra, conducted by Piero Coppola, in the first recording of his Piano Concerto No. 3, recorded in London by His Master's Voice in June 1932. Prokofiev also recorded some of his solo piano music for HMV in Paris in February 1935; these recordings were issued on CD by Pearl and Naxos. In 1938, he conducted the Moscow Philharmonic Orchestra in a recording of the second suite from his Romeo and Juliet ballet; this performance was later released on LP and CD. A short sound film has been discovered of Prokofiev playing some of the music from his opera War and Peace and then explaining the music.

== Honours and awards ==
- Six Stalin Prizes:

(1943), 2nd degree – for Piano Sonata No. 7
(1946), 1st degree – for Symphony No. 5 and Piano Sonata No. 8
(1946), 1st degree – for the music for the film "Ivan the Terrible" Part 1 (1945)
(1946), 1st degree – for the ballet "Cinderella" (1944)
(1947), 1st degree – for Violin Sonata No. 1
(1951), 2nd degree – for vocal-symphonic suite Winter Bonfire and the oratorio On Guard for Peace on poems by Samuil Marshak

- Lenin Prize (1957 – posthumous) – for Symphony No. 7
- People's Artist of the RSFSR (1947)
- Order of the Red Banner of Labour
- In 2011, his 120th birthday was honored with a Google Doodle.

== Works ==
Important works include (in chronological order):

- Piano Concerto No. 1 in D♭ major, Op. 10
- Toccata in D minor, Op. 11, for piano
- Piano Sonata No. 2 in D minor, Op. 14
- Piano Concerto No. 2 in G minor, Op. 16
- Sarcasms, Op. 17, for piano
- Violin Concerto No. 1 in D major, Op. 19
- Scythian Suite, Op. 20, suite for orchestra
- Chout, Op. 21, ballet in six scenes
- Visions fugitives, Op. 22, set of twenty piano pieces
- The Gambler, Op. 24, opera in four acts
- Symphony No. 1 in D major "Classical", Op. 25
- Piano Concerto No. 3 in C major, Op. 26
- Tales of an Old Grandmother, Op. 31, four piano pieces
- The Love for Three Oranges, Op. 33, opera in four acts
- Overture on Hebrew Themes, Op. 34, for clarinet and piano quintet
- Quintet, Op. 39, for oboe, clarinet, violin, viola, and double-bass
- The Fiery Angel, Op. 37, opera in five acts
- Symphony No. 2 in D minor, Op. 40
- Le pas d'acier, Op. 41, ballet in two scenes
- Divertissement, Op. 43
- Symphony No. 3 in C minor, Op. 44
- The Prodigal Son, Op. 46, ballet in three scenes
- Symphony No. 4 in C major, Op. 47 (revised as Op. 112)
- Sinfonietta, Op. 5/48
- Four Portraits from The Gambler, Op. 49
- String Quartet No. 1 in B minor, Op. 50
- Symphonic Song, Op. 57
- Lieutenant Kije, Op. 60, suite for orchestra, includes the famous Troika
- Violin Concerto No. 2 in G minor, Op. 63
- Romeo and Juliet, Op. 64, ballet in four acts
  - Suite No. 1 from Romeo and Juliet, Op. 64bis
  - Suite No. 2 from Romeo and Juliet, Op. 64ter
  - Suite No. 3 from Romeo and Juliet, Op. 101
  - Ten Pieces for Piano from Romeo and Juliet, Op. 75
- Peter and the Wolf, Op. 67, a children's tale for narrator and orchestra
- Alexander Nevsky, Op. 78, cantata for mezzo-soprano, chorus, and orchestra
- Violin Sonata No. 1 in F minor, Op. 80
- The "War Sonatas":
  - Piano Sonata No. 6 in A major, Op. 82
  - Piano Sonata No. 7 in B♭ major, Op. 83
  - Piano Sonata No. 8 in B♭ major, Op. 84
- Zdravitsa, Op. 85
- Betrothal in a Monastery, Op. 86, opera
- Cinderella, Op. 87, ballet in three acts
- War and Peace, Op. 91, opera in thirteen scenes
- String Quartet No. 2 in F major, Op. 92
- Flute Sonata in D, Op. 94 (later arranged as Violin Sonata No. 2, Op. 94a)
- Symphony No. 5 in B♭ major, Op. 100
- Piano Sonata No. 9 in C major, Op. 103
- Symphony No. 6 in E♭ minor, Op. 111
- Ivan the Terrible, Op. 116, music for Eisenstein's film
- The Tale of the Stone Flower, Op. 118, ballet in two acts
- On Guard for Peace, Op. 124
- Symphony-Concerto for Cello and Orchestra in E minor, Op. 125
- Symphony No. 7 in C♯ minor, Op. 131

== Writings ==
- Prokofiev, Sergei (1979). David H. Appel (ed.). Prokofiev by Prokofiev: A Composer's Memoir. Guy Daniels (translator). New York: Doubleday & Co. ISBN 978-0-385-09960-8.
- Prokofiev, Sergei (1991). Soviet Diary 1927 and Other Writings. London: Faber and Faber.
- Prokofiev, Sergei (2000) [1960]. S. Shlifstein (ed.). Sergei Prokofiev: Autobiography, Articles, Reminiscences. Translated by Rose Prokofieva. The Minerva Group. ISBN 978-0-89875-149-9.
- Prokofiev, Sergei (2002). Dnyevnik 1907–1933 (3 vols) (in Russian). Спркфв. ISBN 978-2-9518138-0-9. ISBN 978-2-9518138-1-6, ISBN 978-2-9518138-2-3
- Prokofiev, Sergei (2006). Diaries 1907–1914: Prodigious Youth. Translated by Phillips, Anthony. London/Ithaca: Faber and Faber/Cornell University Press. ISBN 978-0-8014-4540-8.
- Prokofiev, Sergei (2008). Diaries 1915–1923: Behind the Mask. Translated by Phillips, Anthony. London / Ithaca: Faber and Faber/Cornell University Press. ISBN 978-0-571-22630-6.
- Prokofiev, Sergei (2012). Diaries 1924–1933: Prodigal Son. Translated by Phillips, Anthony. London/ Ithaca: Faber and Faber/Cornell University Press. ISBN 978-0-571-23405-9.
- Bibliography, Prokofiev Center
