= Scythian Suite =

Orchestral suite by Sergei Prokofiev

- Orchestral suite by Sergei Prokofiev
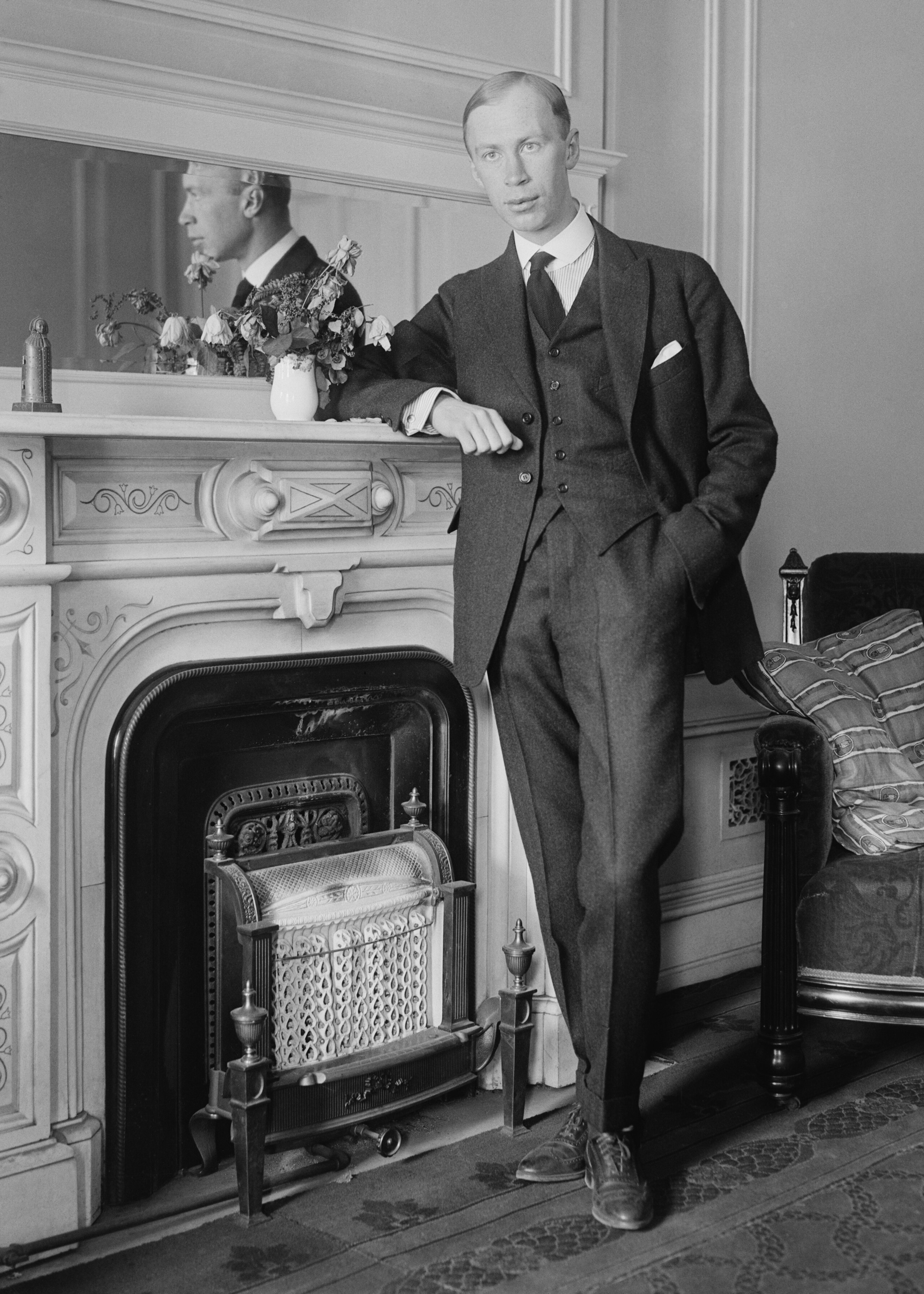
- Sergei Prokofiev in 1918
- Opus: 20
- Composed: 1915
- Movements: Four
- Scoring: Orchestra

Premiere
- Date: 16 January 1916
- Location: St. Petersburg
- Conductor: Sergei Prokofiev

The Scythian Suite, Op. 20 is an orchestral suite by Sergei Prokofiev written in 1915.

== Background ==
Prokofiev originally wrote the music for the ballet Ala i Lolli, the story of which takes place among the Scythians. Commissioned by Sergei Diaghilev, the ballet was written to a scenario by Russian poet Sergey Gorodetsky. But when Diaghilev rejected the score even before its completion, the composer reworked the music into a suite for concert performance.

The suite was premiered on 29 January [O.S. 16 January] 1916 at the Mariinsky Theatre in St. Petersburg, conducted by the composer.

A scheduled Moscow performance of the suite that December was cancelled at the last minute due to the difficulty of finding musicians to play the piece; it called for an enlarged orchestra and, as many performers had been mobilized due to World War I, enough players could not be found. Nevertheless, the Moscow music critic Leonid Sabaneyev gave the music a scathing review. Prokofiev responded that the supposed performance must have been a product of Sabaneyev's imagination, as the only copy of the score was in the composer's hands and thus he had not even been able to see it.

== Movements ==
The suite is in four movements and lasts around 20 minutes.

1. Invocation to Veles and Ala – barbaric and colorful music describing the Scythians' invocation of the sun
2. The Evil God and the Dance of the Pagan Monsters (also known as "The Alien God and the Dance of the Evil Spirits") – as the Scythians make a sacrifice to Ala, daughter of Veles, the Evil God performs a violent dance surrounded by seven monsters
3. Night – the Evil God harms Ala; the Moon Maidens descend to console her
4. The Glorious Departure of Lolli and the Cortège of the Sun – Lolli, the hero, comes to save Ala; the Sun God assists him in defeating the Evil God. They are victorious, and the suite ends with a musical picture of the sunrise

== Instrumentation ==
The music is scored for a large orchestra:

Woodwinds
piccolo
3 flutes (3rd doubling alto flute)
3 oboes
cor anglais
3 clarinets (3rd doubling E♭ clarinet)
bass clarinet
3 bassoons
contrabassoon
Brass
8 horns
4 (optionally 5) trumpets (3rd doubling E♭ trumpet)
4 trombones
tuba

Percussion

timpani

glockenspiel
xylophone
2 cymbals
tamtam
triangle
bass drum
snare drum
tambourine

Keyboards
celesta
piano
Strings
2 harps
violins I, II
violas
cellos
double basses

== Adaptations ==
The Bermuda Triangle (1978) is an electronic adaptation by Isao Tomita that includes the first movement (The Adoration of Veles and Ala) of the Scythian Suite.

The track "The Enemy God Dances with the Black Spirits" on Works Volume 1 by progressive rock group Emerson, Lake & Palmer is an arrangement of the second movement.

The San Francisco Symphony Orchestra, conducted by Michael Tilson Thomas, performed the piece during Metallica's S&M2 concerts at Chase Center, San Francisco on September 6 and 8, 2019.
