= List of compositions by Alexander Scriabin =

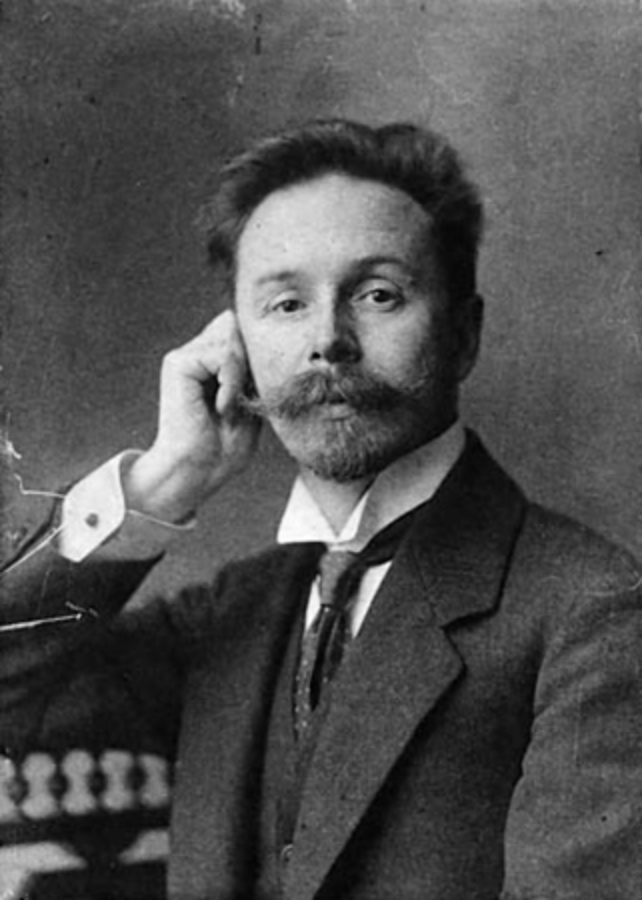
Alexander Nikolayevich Scriabin

This is a list of compositions by Alexander Scriabin.

The list is categorized by Genre, with Piano works organized by style of piece. The list can be sorted by Opus number and WoO number (mostly early works published posthumously) and Anh number (mostly fragmentary works), by clicking on the "Opus" header of the table. Sorted in this Opus/WoO/Anh order, duplicate entries (those listed initially under more than one genre) are moved to the bottom of the list with the unused genre headers.

The majority of Scriabin's works have opus numbers. His work can be divided into three (somewhat arbitrary) periods, based on increasing atonality: early, 1883–1902 (Opp. 1–29); middle, 1903–1909 (Opp. 30–58); and late, 1910–1915 (Opp. 59–74). The development of Scriabin's style can be traced in his ten published sonatas for piano. The first four are in the Romantic style. Initially the music is reminiscent of Chopin, but Scriabin's unique voice, present from the beginning, becomes fully present even in these early pieces. With the fourth and fifth sonatas, Scriabin explored more complex, chromatic harmonies. Each of the following sonatas are often highly dissonant and have a new form of tonality that some describe as atonal and others describe as simply different from conventional tonality. Vers la flamme was intended to be the eleventh sonata, but he was forced to publish it early due to financial concerns. Most of Scriabin's sonatas consist of only a single movement; the first and third are the only ones with multiple movements typical of the sonata form.

== List of compositions ==
Opus	Title	Scoring	Date	Notes
=== Orchestral works ===
	Rondo	orchestra	1883–87	no details available
A18	Scherzo in F major	string orchestra	1888 (1889?)	fragment; reconstructed by Daniel Bosshard 1987 as 2nd mvt. of "Andante and Scherzo" with Anh 20
20	Piano Concerto in F♯ minor	piano & orchestra	1896	
W24	Symphonic Allegro in D minor	orchestra	1896(–97?)	unfinished; possibly intended as a movement of a symphony; completed by Alexander Gauk 1949 as "Symphonic Poem in D minor", recorded by Boris Demchenko (cond), released Melodiya LP 1972, CD 1993; also arranged for piano solo by Leonid Sabaneyev as Poème (en forme d'une sonate) published 1926 as No. 2 of 2 Oeuvres posthumes with his piano solo arrangement of Fantaisie, WoO 18; also arranged for piano solo by Nikolai Zhilyayev published 1928
24	Rêverie	orchestra	1898	also arranged for piano four-hands by Alexander Winkler at the request of Scriabin, published 1899
A20	Andante in A major	string orchestra	1899	fragment; reconstructed by Daniel Bosshard 1987 as 1st mvt. of "Andante and Scherzo" with Anh 18
26	Symphony No. 1 in E major	orchestra, with chorus and soloists	1900	also arranged for piano four-hands by Alexander Winkler at the request of Scriabin, published 1900
29	Symphony No. 2 in C minor	orchestra	1902	also arranged for piano four-hands by Vasily Kalafati at the request of Scriabin, published 1903
43	Le divin poème (The Divine Poem), Symphony No. 3 in C minor	orchestra	1903	also arranged for piano four-hands by Lev Konyus (Léon Conus) at the request of Scriabin, published 1905
54	Le Poème de l'extase (The Poem of Ecstasy), (Symphony No. 4)	orchestra	1907	also arranged for 2 pianos by Lev Konyus (Léon Conus) at the request of Scriabin, published 1908
60	Prométhée, Le Poème du feu (Prometheus, The Poem of Fire), (Symphony No. 5)	orchestra, with piano, organ, clavier à lumières, and chorus	1910	also arranged for 2 pianos by Leonid Sabaneyev at the request of Scriabin, published 1913
=== Piano works ===
==== Album Leaves ====
W17	Feuillet d'Album de Monighetti (Album Leaf for O. I. Monighetti) in A♭ major (Monighetti's Album Leaf)	piano	1889	published 1947
45#1	Feuillet d'album (Album Leaf) in E♭ major, No. 1 from 3 Morceaux, Op. 45	piano	1904	
W25	Feuillet d'Album (Album Leaf) in F♯ major	piano	1905	published 1905
58	Feuillet d'Album (Album Leaf)	piano	1910	
==== Dances ====
51#4	Danse languide (Languid Dance), No. 4 from 4 Morceaux, Op. 51	piano	1906	
57#2	Caresse dansée (Dancing Caress), No. 2 from 2 Morceaux, Op. 57	piano	1908	
73	2 Danses: 1. Guirlandes (Garlands); 2. Flammes sombres (Dark flames)	piano	1914	
==== Etudes ====
A8	Étude in D♭ major	piano	1887	fragment only
A9	Étude in F♯ major	piano	1887?	fragment only
2#1	Étude in C♯ minor, No. 1 from 3 Morceaux, Op. 2	piano	1887	
W22	Étude in D♯ minor	piano	1894	intended as No. 12 of 12 Études, Op. 8, but discarded; published 1947
8	12 Études: 1. C♯ major 2. F♯ minor 3. B minor 4. B major 5. E major 6. A major 7. B♭ minor 8. A♭ major 9. G♯ minor 10. D♭ major 11. B♭ minor 12. D♯ minor	piano	1894	
42	8 Études: 1. D♭ major 2. F♯ minor 3. F♯ major 4. F♯ major 5. C♯ minor 6. D♭ major 7. F minor 8. E♭ major	piano	1903	
49#1	Étude in E♭ major, No. 1 from 3 Morceaux, Op. 49	piano	1905	
56#4	Étude, No. 4 from 4 Pièces, Op. 56	piano	1908	
65	3 Études: 1. (Allegro fantastico); 2. (Allegretto); 3. (Molto vivace)	piano	1911–12	
==== Fantasies ====
W6	Sonate-Fantaisie (Sonata-Fantasy) in G♯ minor	piano	1886	published 1940
W18	Fantaisie in A minor	2 pianos	1892–93	many catalogues and publications date this 1889, but the unpublished manuscript is dated Dec 1892 – Jan 1893; intended for piano & orchestra, the 2nd piano part is clearly an orchestral reduction, while the 1st piano is clearly the soloist; however, it is not clear if this is the original working version to be later orchestrated, or a reduction from a now-lost orchestral score; if the latter, the lost orchestral score might be the version composed in 1889; 2nd piano part orchestrated by G. Zinger, recorded by Igor Zhukov (p) Mikhail Yurovsky (cond), released Melodiya LP 1972, CD 1993; 2nd piano part orchestrated by Gennady Rozhdestvensky, recorded 1998 Rozhdestvensky (cond) Viktoria Postnikova (p), released Chandos 1999; rearranged by Ethel Bartlett & Rae Robertson that redistributes the 2 piano parts more equally between them, published 1940, various recordings; also arranged for piano solo by Leonid Sabaneyev published 1926 as No. 1 of 2 Oeuvres posthumes with his piano solo arrangement of "Symphonic Allegro", WoO 24
19	Sonate-Fantaisie (Sonata-Fantasy) No. 2 in G♯ minor	piano	1897	
28	Fantaisie in B minor	piano	1900	
==== Fugues ====
W12	Fugue in F minor	piano	1888	
–	Fugue in F minor	2 pianos	1888?	arrangement of WoO 12
W13	Fugue in F minor	piano	1888	
–	Fugue in F minor	2 pianos	1888?	arrangement of WoO 13
W20	Fugue à 5 voix (Fugue in 5 parts) in E minor (Fuga a 5)	piano	1892	published 1916
==== Impromptus ====
A13	Valse-impromptu in E♭ major	piano	1887	fragment only
2#3	Impromptu à la mazur (Impromptu-Mazurka) in C major, No. 3 from 3 Morceaux, Op. 2	piano	1889	
7	2 Impromptus à la mazur (2 Impromptu-Mazurkas): 1. G♯ minor 2. F♯ major	piano	1892	
10	2 Impromptus: 1. F♯ minor 2. A major	piano	1894	
12	2 Impromptus: 1. F♯ major 2. B♭ minor	piano	1895	
14	2 Impromptus: 1. B major 2. F♯ minor	piano	1895	
==== Mazurkas ====
W14	Mazurka in B minor	piano	1884	
W11; W15; W16	3 Mazurkas: 1. C major 2. B minor 3. F major	piano	1886; 1889; 1889	published 1893
2#3	Impromptu à la mazur (Impromptu-Mazurka) in C major, No. 3 from 3 Morceaux, Op. 2	piano	1889	
3	10 Mazurkas: 1. B minor 2. F♯ minor 3. G minor 4. E major 5. D♯ minor 6. C♯ minor 7. E minor 8. B♭ minor 9. G♯ minor 10. E♭ minor	piano	1889	
7	2 Impromptus à la mazur (2 Impromptu-Mazurkas): 1. G♯ minor 2. F♯ major	piano	1892	
25	9 Mazurkas: 1. F minor 2. C major 3. E minor 4. E major 5. C♯ minor 6. F♯ major 7. F♯ minor 8. B major 9. E♭ minor	piano	1899	
40	2 Mazurkas: 1. D♭ major 2. F♯ major	piano	1903	
==== Morceaux ====
2	3 Morceaux: 1. Étude in C♯ minor 2. Prélude in B major 3. Impromptu à la mazur (Impromptu-Mazurka) in C major	piano	1887; 1889; 1889	
9	Prélude et Nocturne: 1. Prélude in C♯ minor 2. Nocturne in D♭ major	piano left-hand	1894	
45	3 Morceaux: 1. Feuillet d'album (Album Leaf) in E♭ major 2. Poème fantasque (Whimsical Poem) in C major 3. Prélude in E♭ major	piano	1904	
49	3 Morceaux: 1. Étude in E♭ major 2. Prélude in F major 3. Rêverie in C major	piano	1905	
51	4 Morceaux: 1. Fragilité (Fragility); 2. Prélude in A minor 3. Poème ailé (Winged Poem); 4. Danse languide (Languid Dance)	piano	1906	
52	3 Morceaux: 1. Poème in C major 2. Enigme (Enigma); 3. Poème languide (Languid Poem) in B major	piano	1907	
56	4 Pièces: 1. Prélude in E♭ major 2. Ironies in C major 3. Nuances; 4. Étude	piano	1908	
57	2 Morceaux: 1. Désir (Desire); 2. Caresse dansée (Dancing Caress)	piano	1908	
59	2 Pièces: 1. Poème; 2. Prélude	piano	1910	
==== Nocturnes ====
W3	Nocturne in A♭ major	piano	1884–86(–85?)	published 1910
5	2 Nocturnes: 1. F♯ minor 2. A major	piano	1890	
9#2	Nocturne in D♭ major, No. 2 from "Prélude et Nocturne", Op. 9	piano left-hand	1894	
61	Poème-Nocturne	piano	1912	
==== Poems ====
32	2 Poèmes: 1. F♯ major 2. D major	piano	1903	
34	Poème tragique (Tragic Poem) in B♭ major	piano	1903	
36	Poème satanique (Satanic Poem) in C major	piano	1903	
41	Poème in D♭ major	piano	1903	
44	2 Poèmes: 1. C major (Lento); 2. C major (Moderato)	piano	1904	
45#2	Poème fantasque (Whimsical Poem) in C major, No. 2 from 3 Morceaux, Op. 45	piano	1904	
51#3	Poème ailé (Winged Poem), No. 3 from 4 Morceaux, Op. 51	piano	1906	
52#1	Poème in C major, No. 1 from 3 Morceaux, Op. 52	piano	1907	
52#3	Poème languide (Languid Poem) in B major, No. 3 from 3 Morceaux, Op. 52	piano	1907	
59#1	Poème, No. 1 from 2 Pièces, Op. 59	piano	1910	
61	Poème-Nocturne	piano	1912	
63	2 Poèmes: 1. Masque (Mask); 2. Étrangeté (Strangeness)	piano	1912	
69	2 Poèmes: 1. (Allegretto); 2. (Allegretto)	piano	1913	
71	2 Poèmes: 1. Fantastique (Fantastic); 2. En rêvant (Dreaming)	piano	1914	
72	Vers la flamme (Toward the Flame), Poème	piano	1914	
==== Preludes ====
	Prélude in D minor	piano	1883	no details available
2#2	Prélude in B major, No. 2 from 3 Morceaux, Op. 2	piano	1889	
9#1	Prélude in C♯ minor, No. 1 from "Prélude et Nocturne", Op. 9	piano left-hand	1894	
11	24 Préludes: 1. C major 2. A minor 3. G major 4. E minor 5. D major 6. B minor 7. A major 8. F♯ minor 9. E major 10. C♯ minor 11. B major 12. G♯ minor 13. G♭ major 14. E♭ minor 15. D♭ major 16. B♭ minor 17. A♭ major 18. F minor 19. E♭ major 20. C minor 21. B♭ major 22. G minor 23. F major 24. D minor	piano	1888–96	#4 was originally an unfinished Ballade, Anh. 14, written in 1887. Its themes were reworked in 1888 and retitled Prélude, intended in a group of Morceaux. After #6 and the Prélude of Op. 2 were written in 1889, only the Op. 2 was grouped into a Morceaux collection, and #4 and #6 were put aside. After writing another Prélude #10 in 1893–94, Scriabin decided in 1895 to write a set of 24 in all the major and minor keys, and included the 3 previously-written in the new set. The remaining 21 were written 1895–96.
13	6 Préludes: 1. C major 2. A minor 3. G major 4. E minor 5. D major 6. B minor	piano	1895	
15	5 Préludes: 1. A major 2. F♯ minor 3. E major 4. E major 5. C♯ minor	piano	1896	
16	5 Préludes: 1. B major 2. G♯ minor 3. G♭ major 4. E♭ minor 5. F♯ major	piano	1895	
17	7 Préludes: 1. D minor 2. E♭ major 3. D♭ major 4. B♭ minor 5. F minor 6. B♭ major 7. G minor	piano	1896	
22	4 Préludes: 1. G♯ minor 2. C♯ minor 3. B major 4. B minor	piano	1897	
27	2 Préludes: 1. G minor (Patetico); 2. B major (Andante)	piano	1901	
31	4 Préludes: 1. D♭ major/C major 2. F♯ minor 3. E♭ minor 4. C major	piano	1903	
33	4 Préludes: 1. E major 2. F♯ major 3. C major 4. A♭ major	piano	1903	
35	3 Préludes: 1. D♭ major 2. B♭ major 3. C major	piano	1903	
37	4 Préludes: 1. B♭ minor 2. F♯ major 3. B major 4. G minor	piano	1903	
39	4 Préludes: 1. F♯ major 2. D major 3. G major 4. A♭ major	piano	1903	
45#3	Prélude in E♭ major, No. 3 from 3 Morceaux, Op. 45	piano	1904	
48	4 Préludes: 1. F♯ major 2. C major 3. D♭ major 4. C major	piano	1905	
49#2	Prélude in F major, No. 2 from 3 Morceaux, Op. 49	piano	1905	
51#2	Prélude in A minor, No. 2 from 4 Morceaux, Op. 51	piano	1906	
56#1	Prélude in E♭ major, No. 1 from 4 Pièces, Op. 56	piano	1908	
59#2	Prélude, No. 2 from 2 Pièces, Op. 59	piano	1910	
67	2 Préludes: 1. (Andante); 2. (Presto)	piano	1913	
74	5 Préludes: 1. (Douloureux, déchirant); 2. (Très lent, contemplatif); 3. (Allegro drammatico); 4. (Lent, vague, indécis); 5. (Fier, belliqueux)	piano	1914	
==== Scherzos ====
W4	Scherzo in E♭ major	piano	1886	
W5	Scherzo in A♭ major	piano	1886	
46	Scherzo	piano	1905	
==== Sonatas ====
W6	Sonate-Fantaisie (Sonata-Fantasy) in G♯ minor	piano	1886	dedicated to Natalya Sekerina; published 1940
A11	Sonata in C♯ minor	piano	1887	fragment only
W19	Sonate in E♭ minor: 1. Allegro appassionato 2. Andantino; 3. Presto	piano	1887–89	published 1986 with 2nd mvt completed by someone else; 1. revised as Op. 4; 2. unfinished 3. first published separately in 1947 as "Presto"
6	Sonate No. 1 in F minor	piano	1892	
19	Sonate-Fantaisie (Sonata-Fantasy) No. 2 in G♯ minor	piano	1897	
23	Sonate No. 3 in F♯ minor, (États d'âme (Moods))	piano	1898	
30	Sonate No. 4 in F♯ major	piano	1903	
53	Sonate No. 5	piano	1907	
62	Sonate No. 6	piano	1911–12	
64	Sonate No. 7, (Messe blanche (White Mass))	piano	1912	
66	Sonate No. 8	piano	1912–13	
68	Sonate No. 9, (Messe noire (Black Mass))	piano	1913	
70	Sonate No. 10, (Insect Sonata)	piano	1913	
==== Waltzes ====
W8	Valse in D♭ major	piano	1886	published 1929
W7	Valse in G♯ minor	piano	1886	
1	Valse in F minor	piano	1886	
A13	Valse-impromptu in E♭ major	piano	1887	fragment only
38	Valse in A♭ major	piano	1903	
47	Quasi-valse in F major	piano	1905	
==== Miscellaneous ====
W1	Canon in D minor	piano	1883(–84?)	published 1927
	Rhapsodie hongroise (Hungarian Rhapsody)	piano	1883–87	no details available
W9	Variations sur un thème de M'lle Egorov (Variations on a Theme by Mademoiselle Yegorova) in F minor (Egoroff Variations)	piano	1887	published 1947
A14	Ballade in B♭ minor	piano	1887(–88?)	fragment only; some themes used later in Prélude, Op. 11 No. 4
A16	Piano Piece in B♭ minor	piano	1887	discovered to be complete
4	Allegro Appassionato in E♭ minor	piano	1892	revised version of 1st mvt. of Sonate in E♭ minor, WoO 19
18	Allegro de concert (Concert Allegro) in B♭ minor	piano	1896	
–	Allegro in D minor	2 pianos	1897?	reduction of "Symphonic Allegro", WoO 24; published 1997
21	Polonaise in B♭ minor	piano	1897	
–	Piano Concerto in F♯ minor	2 pianos	1896–98?	reduction of the orchestral part of Op. 20 for a 2nd piano
49#3	Rêverie in C major, No. 3 from 3 Morceaux, Op. 49	piano	1905	
51#1	Fragilité (Fragility), No. 1 from 4 Morceaux, Op. 51	piano	1906	
52#2	Enigme (Enigma), No. 2 from 3 Morceaux, Op. 52	piano	1907	
56#2	Ironies in C major, No. 2 from 4 Pièces, Op. 56	piano	1908	
56#3	Nuances, No. 3 from 4 Pièces, Op. 56	piano	1908	
57#1	Désir (Desire), No. 1 from 2 Morceaux, Op. 57	piano	1908	
57#2	Caresse dansée (Dancing Caress), No. 2 from 2 Morceaux, Op. 57	piano	1908	
63#1	Masque (Mask), No. 1 from 2 Poèmes, Op. 63	piano	1912	
63#2	Étrangeté (Strangeness), No. 2 from 2 Poèmes, Op. 63	piano	1912	
'71#1	Fantastique (Fantastic), No. 1 from 2 Poèmes, Op. 71	piano	1914	
'71#2	En rêvant (Dreaming), No. 2 from 2 Poèmes, Op. 71	piano	1914	
72	Vers la flamme (Toward the Flame), Poème	piano	1914	
73#1	Guirlandes (Garlands), No. 1 from 2 Danses, Op. 73	piano	1914	
73#2	Flammes sombres (Dark Flames), No. 2 from 2 Danses, Op. 73	piano	1914	
=== Other works ===
W10	Duett in D minor	2 voices & piano	1886	
	Fantasie in A minor	instrumentation unknown	1887–88	same as WoO 18?
W21	Romance in A minor	horn (or cello) & piano	1890 (1893–97?)	published 1927
W2	Romance in F♯ major	voice & piano	1894 (1892–93?)	dedicated to Natalya Sekerina; published 1924
A?	Keistut and Biruta	opera	c.1898	unfinished; completed from sketches by Alexander Nemtin c.1971 as an Oratorio for soprano, baritone, and orchestra, premiered c.1971, recorded c.1971 privately by Nemtin unreleased
W23	"Variations on a Russian Theme" (theme & 11 variations) in G major	string quartet	1899 (1898?)	collaborative composition by Artsybushev, Scriabin, Glazunov, Rimsky-Korsakov, Lyadov, Vītols, Blumenfeld, Ewald, Winkler, and Sokolov; Scriabin wrote Variation No. 2; published 1899
50	(opus number reserved or unused)		1905–06	
55	(opus number reserved or unused)		1907–08	
A?	Mysterium	stage	1903–15	multimedia interactive stage work; unfinished, fragments of "Prefatory Act" in manuscript; "Prefatory Action" completed from sketches by Alexander Nemtin as "Preparation for the Final Mystery" in 3 parts: Part 1 "Universe" 1970–72 Part 2 "Mankind" 1976–80 Part 3 "Transfiguration" 1996; Part 1 recorded 1973 Kiril Kondrashin (cond), released LP 1973, All 3 parts premiered/recorded 1996 Vladimir Ashkenazy (cond), released CD 2000
–	Nuances: Op. 52#3, 59#1, 58, 51, 57#1, 57#2, 65#1, 61, 74#5, 71#1, 59#2, 63#1, 63#2, 65#3	ballet		suite of 14 late Scriabin piano pieces orchestrated by Alexander Nemtin 1975, premiered/recorded 1996 Vladimir Ashkenazy (cond), released CD 2000
