= Sonata =

Type of instrumental composition

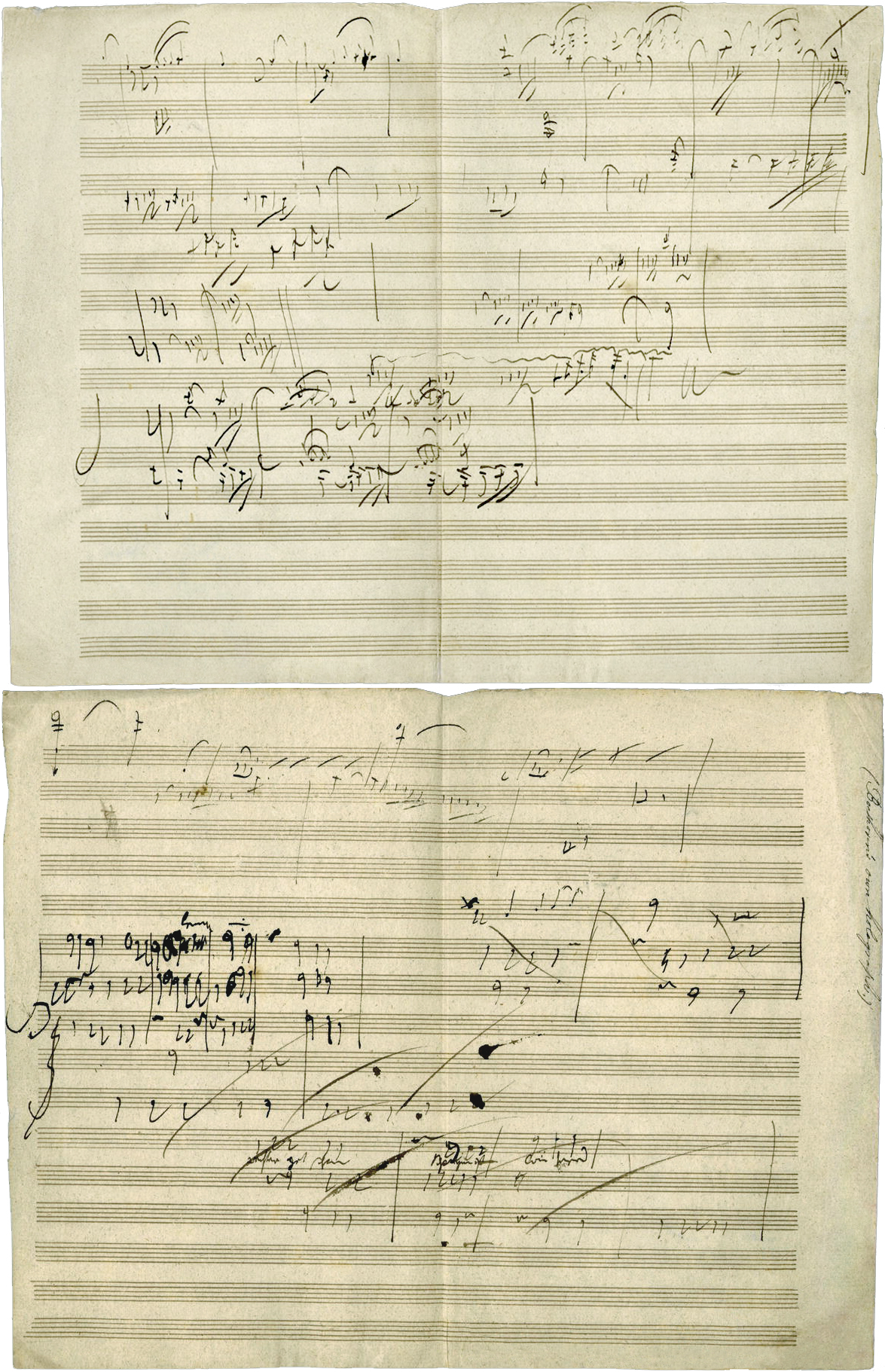
Ludwig van Beethoven's manuscript sketch for Piano Sonata No. 28, Movement IV Geschwind, doch nicht zu sehr und mit Entschlossenheit (Allegro), in his own handwriting. The piece was completed in 1816.

Beethoven's Piano Sonata No. 28 in A major, Op. 101
I. Allegro, ma non troppo

II. Vivace alla marcia

III. Adagio, ma non troppo, con affetto
IV. Allegro
Performed by Daniel Veesey

In music, a sonata (/səˈnɑːtə/; pl. sonate) (Note: Italian: [soˈnaːta]; from Latin and Italian: sonare [archaic Italian; replaced in the modern language by suonare], "to sound") is a piece that consists of 3 or 4 movements that can be for different musical instruments. The term evolved through the history of music, designating a variety of forms until the Classical era, when it took on increasing importance. Sonata is a vague term, with varying meanings depending on the context and time period. By the early 19th century it came to represent a principle of composing large-scale works. It was applied to most instrumental genres and regarded—alongside the fugue—as one of two fundamental methods of organizing, interpreting and analyzing concert music. Though the musical style of sonatas has changed since the Classical era, most 20th- and 21st-century sonatas maintain the overarching structure.

The term sonatina, pl. sonatine, the diminutive form of sonata, is often used for a short or technically easy sonata.

== Instrumentation ==
In the Baroque period, a sonata was for one or more instruments, almost always with continuo. After the Baroque period most works designated as sonatas specifically are performed by a solo instrument, most often a keyboard instrument, or by a solo instrument accompanied by a keyboard instrument.

Sonatas for a solo instrument other than keyboard have been composed, as have sonatas for other combinations of instruments.

There are some general guidelines a typical sonata might follow, however, the term sonata still hadn’t taken shape yet in the 17th century because of the sinfonia conflating the term. Sinfonia were pieces played by multiple instruments together, upholding the characteristics of the imitative canzona. The sinfonia showed precursors to the introductory movement of sonata form today. As newer types of canzonas and concertos began to form (called stile moderno), the sonata was still an ambiguous genre because many characteristics of other forms became entangled with early sonatas.

The sonata finally began to become a separate entity starting in the 17th to 18th centuries when the canzona became less popular and the suite, concerto, and sonata all developed in different directions. In short, a suite is a sequence of movements based on dance movements, whereas sonatas do not possess complete dance like movements. Sonatas can contain movements assembled from parts of dance movements, but the passages are not formal enough to be called a suite. Sonatas were standardized to either fall into being a sonata da camera, “chamber sonata,” or a sonata da chiesa, “church sonata.” The twelve chamber trio sonatas of Corelli’s Op. 2 (1685) were foundational to the development of the sonata, and these along with his other prolific work in trio sonatas inspired Bach, Vivaldi, Handel, and Telemann.

The sonata and the suite were two forms that experienced overlap in France, Germany, and England; however, they remained separate in Italy because the scoring criteria were different. Beste writes that during this time period, the keyboard repertoire evolved with the sonata as Bach was writing his keyboard suites, with BWV 825-30 being called “partitas.” Beste writes on the partita that “By the late seventeenth century, however, [the partita] had come to denote a multi-movement instrumental cycle, either still as a set of variations or as a succession of dances. Only in its latter connotation does it overlap with the sonata, and only in a specific instrumental and geographical context: its widespread currency is limited to Germany, and to the solo keyboard repertoire (12). The overlap between sonata and partita is interesting to consider looking at Bach’s unaccompanied sonatas for violin, as Beste writes “they conform to the four-movement ‘church sonata’ pattern established by Corelli, for which no other generic term was available. The partitas, on the other hand, borrow their designation from the keyboard repertoire, as multi-movement dance cycles for solo instrument.”

== History ==
=== Baroque ===
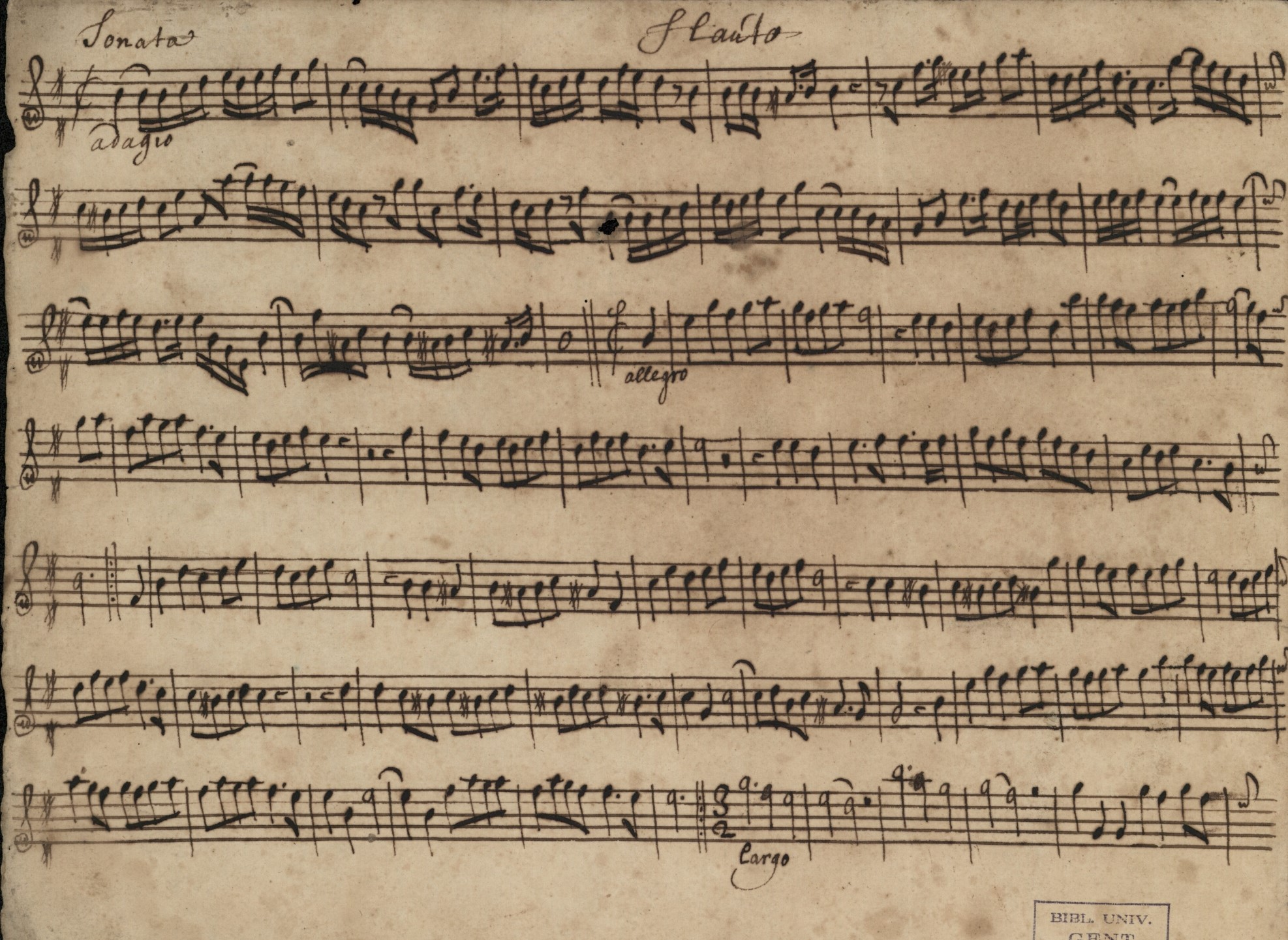
Individual sheet music of a sonata, written in the Baroque period.

In the works of Arcangelo Corelli and his contemporaries, two broad classes of sonata were established, and were first described by Sébastien de Brossard in his Dictionaire de musique (third edition, Amsterdam, ca. 1710): the sonata da chiesa (that is, suitable for use in church), which was the type "rightly known as Sonatas", and the sonata da camera (proper for use at court), which consists of a prelude followed by a succession of dances, all in the same key. Although the four, five, or six movements of the sonata da chiesa are also most often in one key, one or two of the internal movements are sometimes in a contrasting tonality.

The sonata da chiesa, generally for one or two violins and basso continuo, consisted normally of a slow introduction, a loosely fugued allegro, a cantabile slow movement, and a lively finale in some binary form suggesting affinity with the dance-tunes of the suite. This scheme, however, was not very clearly defined, until the works of Arcangelo Corelli when it became the essential sonata and persisted as a tradition of Italian violin music.

The sonata da camera consisted almost entirely of idealized dance-tunes. On the other hand, the features of sonata da chiesa and sonata da camera then tended to be freely intermixed. Although nearly half of Johann Sebastian Bach's 1,100 surviving compositions, arrangements, and transcriptions are instrumental works, only about 4% are sonatas.

The term sonata is also applied to the series of over 500 works for harpsichord solo, or sometimes for other keyboard instruments, by Domenico Scarlatti, originally published under the name Essercizi per il gravicembalo (Exercises for the Harpsichord). Most of these pieces are in one binary-form movement only, with two parts that are in the same tempo and use the same thematic material, though occasionally there will be changes in tempo within the sections. They are frequently virtuosic, and use more distant harmonic transitions and modulations than were common for other works of the time. They were admired for their great variety and invention.

Both the solo and trio sonatas of Vivaldi show parallels with the concerti he was writing at the same time. He composed over 70 sonatas, the great majority of which are of the solo type; most of the rest are trio sonatas, and a very small number are of the multivoice type.

The sonatas of Domenico Paradies are mild and elongated works with a graceful and melodious little second movement included.

=== Classical period ===
The practice of the Classical period would become decisive for the sonata; the term moved from being one of many terms indicating genres or forms, to designating the fundamental form of organization for large-scale works. This evolution stretched over fifty years. The term came to apply both to the structure of individual movements (see Sonata form and History of sonata form) and to the layout of the movements in a multi-movement work. In the transition to the Classical period there were several names given to multimovement works, including divertimento, serenade, and partita, many of which are now regarded effectively as sonatas. The usage of sonata as the standard term for such works began somewhere in the 1770s. Haydn labels his first piano sonata as such in 1771, after which the term divertimento is used sparingly in his output. The term sonata was increasingly applied to either a work for keyboard alone (see piano sonata), or for keyboard and one other instrument, often the violin or cello. It was less and less frequently applied to works with more than two instrumentalists; for example, piano trios were not often labelled sonata for piano, violin, and cello.

Initially the most common layout of movements was:

1. Allegro, which at the time was understood to mean not only a tempo, but also some degree of "working out", or development, of the theme.
2. A middle movement, most frequently a slow movement: an Andante, an Adagio or a Largo; or less frequently a Minuet or Theme and Variations form.
3. A closing movement was generally an Allegro or a Presto, often labeled Finale. The form was often a Rondo or Minuet.

However, two-movement layouts also occur, a practice Haydn uses as late as the 1790s. There was also in the early Classical period the possibility of using four movements, with a dance movement inserted before the slow movement, as in Haydn's piano sonatas No. 6 and No. 8. Mozart's sonatas were also primarily in three movements. Of the works that Haydn labelled piano sonata, divertimento, or partita in Hob XIV, seven are in two movements, thirty-five are in three, and three are in four; and there are several in three or four movements whose authenticity is listed as "doubtful." Composers such as Boccherini would publish sonatas for piano and obbligato instrument with an optional third movement—–in Boccherini's case, 28 cello sonatas.

But increasingly instrumental works were laid out in four, not three movements, a practice seen first in string quartets and symphonies, and reaching the sonata proper in the early sonatas of Beethoven. But two- and three-movement sonatas continued to be written throughout the Classical period: Beethoven's opus 102 pair has a two-movement C major sonata and a three-movement D major sonata. Nevertheless, works with fewer or more than four movements were increasingly felt to be exceptions; they were labelled as having movements "omitted," or as having "extra" movements.

The four-movement layout was by this point standard for the string quartet, and overwhelmingly the most common for the symphony. The usual order of the four movements was:

1. An allegro, which by this point was in what is called sonata form, complete with exposition, development, and recapitulation.
2. A slow movement: an andante, an adagio, or a largo.
3. A dance movement, frequently minuet and trio or—especially later in the classical period—a scherzo and trio.
4. A finale in faster tempo, often in a sonata–rondo form.

When movements appeared out of this order they would be described as "reversed", such as the scherzo coming before the slow movement in Beethoven's 9th Symphony. This usage would be noted by critics in the early 19th century, and it was codified into teaching soon thereafter.

It is difficult to overstate the importance of Beethoven's output of sonatas: 32 piano sonatas, plus sonatas for cello and piano or violin and piano, forming a large body of music that would over time increasingly be thought essential for any serious instrumentalist to master.

=== Romantic period ===
In the early 19th century, the current usage of the term sonata was established, both as regards form per se, and in the sense that a fully elaborated sonata serves as a norm for concert music in general, which other forms are seen in relation to. From this point forward, the word sonata in music theory labels as much the abstract musical form as particular works. Hence there are references to a symphony as a sonata for orchestra. This is referred to by William Newman as the sonata idea.

Among works expressly labeled sonata for the piano, there are the three of Frédéric Chopin, those of Felix Mendelssohn, the three of Robert Schumann, Franz Liszt's Sonata in B minor, and later the sonatas of Johannes Brahms and Sergei Rachmaninoff.

In the early 19th century, the sonata form was defined, from a combination of previous practice and the works of important Classical composers, particularly Haydn, Mozart, Beethoven, but composers such as Clementi also. It is during this period that the differences between the three- and the four-movement layouts became a subject of commentary, with emphasis on the concerto being laid out in three movements, and the symphony in four.

Ernest Newman wrote in the essay "Brahms and the Serpent":

That, perhaps, will be the ideal of the instrumental music of the future; the way to it, indeed, seems at last to be opening out before modern composers in proportion as they discard the last tiresome vestiges of sonata form. This, from being what it was originally, the natural mode of expression of a certain eighteenth century way of thinking in music, became in the nineteenth century a drag upon both individual thinking and the free unfolding of the inner vital force of an idea, and is now simply a shop device by which a bad composer may persuade himself and the innocent reader of textbooks that he is a good one.

=== After the Romantic period ===
The role of the sonata as an extremely important form of extended musical argument would inspire composers such as Hindemith, Prokofiev, Shostakovich, Tailleferre, Ustvolskaya, and Williams to compose in sonata form, and works with traditional sonata structures continue to be composed and performed.

== Scholarship and musicology ==
=== Sonata idea or principle ===
Research into the practice and meaning of sonata form, style, and structure has been the motivation for important theoretical works by Heinrich Schenker, Arnold Schoenberg, and Charles Rosen among others; and the pedagogy of music continued to rest on an understanding and application of the rules of sonata form as almost two centuries of development in practice and theory had codified it.

The development of the classical style and its norms of composition formed the basis for much of the music theory of the 19th and 20th centuries. As an overarching formal principle, sonata was accorded the same central status as Baroque fugue; generations of composers, instrumentalists, and audiences were guided by this understanding of sonata as an enduring and dominant principle in Western music. The sonata idea begins before the term had taken on its present importance, along with the evolution of the Classical period's changing norms. The reasons for these changes, and how they relate to the evolving sense of a new formal order in music, is a matter to which research is devoted. Some common factors which were pointed to include: the shift of focus from vocal music to instrumental music; changes in performance practice, including the loss of the continuo.

Crucial to most interpretations of the sonata form is the idea of a tonal center; and, as the Grove Concise Dictionary of Music puts it: "The main form of the group embodying the 'sonata principle', the most important principle of musical structure from the Classical period to the 20th century: that material first stated in a complementary key be restated in the home key".

The sonata idea has been thoroughly explored by William Newman in his monumental three-volume work Sonata in the Classic Era (A History of the Sonata Idea), begun in the 1950s and published in what has become the standard edition of all three volumes in 1972.

=== 20th-century theory ===
Heinrich Schenker argued that there was an Urlinie or basic tonal melody, and a basic bass figuration. He held that when these two were present, there was basic structure, and that the sonata represented this basic structure in a whole work with a process known as interruption.

As a practical matter Schenker applied his ideas to the editing of the piano sonatas of Beethoven, using original manuscripts and his own theories to "correct" the available sources. The basic procedure was the use of tonal theory to infer meaning from available sources as part of the critical process, even to the extent of completing works left unfinished by their composers. While many of these changes were and are controversial, that procedure has a central role today in music theory, and is an essential part of the theory of sonata structure as taught in most music schools.

== Notable sonatas ==
=== Baroque (c. 1600 – c. 1760) ===
- Johann Sebastian Bach
  - Sonatas for solo violin (BWV 1001, 1003 and 1005)
  - Sonatas for violin and continuo (BWV 1021, 1023), and the doubtful 1024
  - Sonatas for flute and continuo (BWV 1034, 1035)
  - Trio sonatas: for organ (BWV 525–530); for violin and harpsichord (BWV 1014–1019); for viola da gamba and harpsichord (BWV 1027–1029); for flute and harpsichord (BWV 1030, 1032); for flute, violin and continuo (Sonata sopr'il Soggetto Reale included in The Musical Offering)
- Heinrich Ignaz Franz Biber
  - Rosary Sonatas
- George Frideric Handel
  - Sonata for Violin and Continuo in D major (HWV 371)
- Giuseppe Tartini
  - Devil's Trill Sonata
- Domenico Scarlatti
  - 555 sonatas for harpsichord solo

=== Classical (c. 1760 – c. 1830) ===
- Wolfgang Amadeus Mozart
  - Piano Sonata No. 8 in A minor (K. 310)
  - Piano Sonata No. 11 in A major (K. 331/300i)
  - Piano Sonata No. 12 in F major (K. 332)
  - Piano Sonata No. 13 in B♭ major (K. 333)
  - Piano Sonata No. 14 in C minor (K. 457)
  - Piano Sonata No. 15 in F major (K. 533/494)
  - Piano Sonata No. 16 in C major (K. 545)
  - Sonata in A for Violin and Keyboard (K. 526)
- Joseph Haydn
  - Sonata No. 1 in C major, Hob. XVI:1 – Piano Sonata No. 62, Hob.XVI:52
- Franz Schubert
  - Sonata in C minor, D. 958
  - Sonata in A major, D. 959
  - Sonata in B♭ major, D. 960

=== Romantic (c. 1795 – c. 1900) ===
- Ludwig van Beethoven
  - Piano Sonata No. 8 "Pathétique"
  - Piano Sonata No. 14 "Moonlight" (Sonata quasi una fantasia)
  - Piano Sonata No. 17 "Tempest"
  - Piano Sonata No. 19 "Leichte"
  - Piano Sonata No. 21 "Waldstein"
  - Piano Sonata No. 23 "Appassionata"
  - Piano Sonata No. 29 "Hammerklavier"
  - Piano Sonata No. 32 in C minor, Op. 111
  - Violin Sonata No. 5 "Spring"
  - Violin Sonata No. 9 "Kreutzer"
  - Cello Sonata No. 1 in F major Op. 5
  - Cello Sonata No. 2 in G minor Op. 5
  - Cello Sonata No. 3 in A major Op. 69
- Johannes Brahms
  - Cello Sonata No. 1
  - Cello Sonata No. 2
  - Clarinet Sonatas No. 1 and No.2
  - Violin Sonata No. 1
  - Violin Sonata No. 2
  - Violin Sonata No. 3
- Johannes Brahms, Albert Dietrich, and Robert Schumann
  - 'F-A-E' Sonata
- Frédéric Chopin
  - Piano Sonata No. 2 in B♭ minor
  - Piano Sonata No. 3 in B minor
- Paul Dukas
  - Piano Sonata in E♭ minor (1900)
- George Enescu
  - Sonata No. 1 for violin and piano in D major, Op. 2 (1897)
  - Sonata No. 2 for violin and piano in F minor, Op. 6 (1899)
- Edvard Grieg
  - Three sonatas for Violin and Piano
  - Cello Sonata in a-minor
- Franz Liszt
  - Sonata after a Reading of Dante (Fantasia Quasi Sonata)
  - Sonata in B minor
- Robert Schumann
  - Violin Sonata No. 1 in A minor, Op. 105

=== 20th-century and contemporary (c. 1910–present) ===
- Samuel Barber
  - Cello Sonata Op. 6
  - Piano Sonata Op. 26 (1949)
- Jean Barraqué
  - Piano Sonata (1950–52)
- Béla Bartók
  - Sonata for Two Pianos and Percussion
  - Sonata for Piano (1926)
  - Sonata for Solo Violin
  - Sonata No. 1 for Violin and Piano
  - Sonata No. 2 for Violin and Piano
- Alban Berg
  - Sonata for Piano, Op. 1
- Leonard Bernstein
  - Sonata for Clarinet and Piano
- Pierre Boulez
  - Piano Sonata No. 1
  - Piano Sonata No. 2
  - Piano Sonata No. 3
- Benjamin Britten
  - Sonata for Cello and Piano, Op. 65
- John Cage
  - Sonata for Unaccompanied Clarinet
  - Sonatas and Interludes for Prepared Piano (1946–48)
- Claude Debussy
  - Sonata No. 1, for cello and piano (1915)
  - Sonata No. 2, for flute, viola and harp (1915)
  - Sonata No. 3, for violin and piano (1916–1917)
- George Enescu
  - Sonata No. 3 for violin and piano, in A minor, dans le caractère populaire roumain Op. 25 (1926)
  - Sonata No. 2 for cello and piano in C major, Op. 26, No. 2 (1935)
  - Piano Sonata No. 1 in F♯ minor, Op. 24, No. 1 (1924)
  - Piano Sonata No. 3 in D major, Op. 24, No. 3 (1933–1935)
- Karel Goeyvaerts
  - Sonata for Two Pianos, Op. 1
- Hans Werner Henze
  - Royal Winter Music, Guitar Sonatas No. 1 and 2
- Paul Hindemith
  - Sonata for Viola and Piano, Op. 11, No. 4 (1919)
- Charles Ives
  - Piano Sonata No. 2, Concord, Mass., 1840–60
- Leoš Janáček
  - 1. X. 1905 (Janáček's Sonata for Piano)
- Ben Johnston
  - Sonata for Microtonal Piano
- György Ligeti
  - Sonata, for solo cello (1948/1953)
- Nikolai Medtner
  - Piano Sonata No. 1 in F minor, Op. 5 (1901-3)
  - Piano Sonata No. 2 in A♭, Op. 11 (1904-7)
  - Piano Sonata No. 3 in D minor, Sonate-Elegie, Op. 11 (1904-7)
  - Piano Sonata No. 4 in C, Op. 11 (1904-7)
  - Piano Sonata No. 5 in G minor, Op. 22 (1909–10)
  - Piano Sonata No. 6 in C minor, Sonata-Skazka, Op. 22 (1910–11)
  - Piano Sonata No. 7 in E minor, Night Wind, Op. 22 (1910–11)
  - Piano Sonata No. 8 in F♯, Sonata-Ballade, Op. 27 (1912–14)
  - Piano Sonata No. 9 in A minor, War Sonata , Op. 30 (1914–17)
  - Piano Sonata No. 10 in A minor, Sonata-reminiscenza, Op. 38 No. 1 (1920)
  - Piano Sonata No. 11 in C minor, Sonata Tragica, Op. 39, No. 5 (1920)
  - Piano Sonata No. 12 in B♭ minor, Romantica, Op. 53 No. 1 (1930)
  - Piano Sonata No. 13 in F minor, Minacciosa, Op. 53, No. 2 (1930)
  - Piano Sonata No. 14 in G, Sonata-Idyll, Op. 56 (1937)
- Darius Milhaud
  - Sonata for flute, oboe, clarinet, and piano, Op. 47 (1918)
- Sergei Prokofiev
  - Piano Sonatas—six juvenile (1904, 1907, 1907, 1907–08, 1908, 1908–09)
  - Piano Sonata No. 1 in F minor, Op. 1 (1907–09)
  - Piano Sonata No. 2 in D minor, Op. 14 (1912)
  - Piano Sonata No. 3 in A minor, Op. 28 (1907–17)
  - Piano Sonata No. 4 in C minor, Op. 29 (1917)
  - Piano Sonata No. 5 in C major (original version), Op. 38 (1923)
  - Violin Sonata No. 1 in F minor, Op. 80 (1938–46)
  - Piano Sonata No. 6 in A major, Op. 82 (1939–40)
  - Piano Sonata No. 7 in B♭ major, Stalingrad, Op. 83 (1939–42)
  - Piano Sonata No. 8 in B♭ major, Op. 84 (1939–44)
  - Flute Sonata in D major, Op. 94 (1943)
  - Violin Sonata No. 2 in D major, Op. 94 bis (1943)
  - Piano Sonata No. 9 in C major, Op. 103 (1947)
  - Sonata for Solo Violin (Unison Violins) in D major, Op. 115
  - Cello Sonata in C major, Op. 119
  - Sonata for Solo Cello in C♯ minor, Op. 133
  - Piano Sonata No. 5 in C major (revised version), Op. 135 (1952–53)
- Sergei Rachmaninoff
  - Piano Sonata No. 2 in B♭ minor, Op. 36 (1913, revised in 1931)
  - Sonata for Cello and Piano in G minor, Op. 19 (1901)
- Alexander Scriabin
  - Piano Sonata No. 2 (Sonata-Fantasy)
  - Piano Sonata No. 3
  - Piano Sonata No. 4
  - Piano Sonata No. 5
  - Piano Sonata No. 6
  - Piano Sonata No. 7 "White Mass"
  - Piano Sonata No. 8
  - Piano Sonata No. 9 "Black Mass"
  - Piano Sonata No. 10
- Kaikhosru Shapurji Sorabji
  - Piano Sonata No. 0
  - Piano Sonata No. 1
  - Piano Sonata No. 2
  - Piano Sonata No. 3
  - Piano Sonata No. 4
  - Piano Sonata No. 5 "Opus Archimagicum"
- Igor Stravinsky
  - Sonata for Two Pianos (1943)
- Eugène Ysaÿe
  - Six Sonatas for solo violin (1923)
