= Piano Sonata No. 10 =

Piano Sonata No. 10 may refer to:

- Piano Sonata No. 10 (Beethoven), by Ludwig van Beethoven
- Piano Sonata No. 10 (Mozart), by Wolfgang Amadeus Mozart
- Piano Sonata No. 10 (Scriabin), by Alexander Scriabin
- Piano Sonata No. 10 (Prokofiev), by Sergei Prokofiev
