= Anatol Ugorski =

Classical pianist (1942–2023)

- Анатолий Угорский
- Ugorski in the 1990s
- Born: 28 September 1942; Rubtsovsk, Russian SFSR, Soviet Union
- Died: 5 September 2023 (aged 80); Lemgo, North Rhine-Westphalia, Germany
- Education: Leningrad Conservatory
- Occupations: Classical pianist; Academic teacher
- Organizations: Leningrad Conservatory; Hochschule für Musik Detmold

Anatol Ugorski (Russian: Анатолий Зальманович Угорский, romanized: Anatoliy Zal'manovich Ugorskiy, 28 September 1942 – 5 September 2023) was a Russian-born German classical pianist and academic teacher. He studied at the Leningrad Conservatory, and played works by composers such as Schoenberg, Alban Berg, Olivier Messiaen and Pierre Boulez rather than the usual repertoire for Russian pianists. An incident at a concert of Boulez in 1968 made Soviet authorities doubt his political reliability, and they largely interrupted his career for more than ten years. In 1982, he became professor at the Leningrad Conservatory. When his daughter suffered antisemitic harassment in 1990, the family fled to East Berlin, where they lived in a refugee camp for several months. Irene Dische managed to arrange for him to record Beethoven's Diabelli Variations for Deutsche Grammophon in 1991, which launched a career of performing and recording. He became professor of the Hochschule für Musik Detmold, remaining in the post until 2007.

== Life and career ==
Anatol Ugorski was born in Rubtsovsk on 28 September 1942 into a poor family, growing up with five siblings. In 1945 his parents moved to Leningrad where he attended his first school, singing and playing the xylophone. At age six, he passed selection for the music school of the Leningrad Conservatory, although he had not played piano before; he studied there until 1960. He subsequently studied with Nadezhda Golubovskaya until 1965. As a student he attracted attention through the interpretation of avant-garde pieces, instead of the repertoire traditionally associated with Russian pianists. In the USSR he played some of the works of then controversial Western composers such as Arnold Schoenberg, including Pierrot Lunaire, assisted by his wife, musicologist Maja Elik. He played music by Russians such as Sergei Slonimsky, Galina Ustvolskaya, Edison Denisov, Sofia Gubaidulina; the Pole Witold Lutosławski; as well as Soviet premieres of music by Western composers such as Schoenberg, Alban Berg, Olivier Messiaen and Pierre Boulez. In 1968, he won third prize in the George Enescu International Piano Competition.

During a concert tour of Boulez in Leningrad in the autumn of 1968, in a period of relative cultural openness (shortly after the Prague Spring and the invasion of the Warsaw Pact troops), Ugorski's enthusiastic applause was interpreted as a political gesture. He was summoned by the Rectorate and suspected of being politically unreliable, because of his passion for Western contemporary music. His career was stopped for more than ten years and he was confined to work in the provinces, as accompanist of a Young Pioneers choir. Although the choir was only allowed to perform for provincial schoolchildren and in private performances within the Eastern Bloc, their concerts were well-attended.

Irene Dische, an American author, comments: "In this perfect artistic freedom, he played only for himself." His solo concerts became very popular. Ugorski confided that he performed his best Scarlatti concert for children in the industrial city of Asbest. It was only in 1982, under the pressure of his artistic reputation, that he obtained a post of professor at the Leningrad Conservatory.

Unlike other Jews, he had not considered emigrating, but in the spring of 1990 his daughter Dina Ugorskaja, then age 16 and also a pianist and pupil of the Conservatory, suffered antisemitic harassment and felt threatened. The Ugorski family escaped without preparation or papers for East Berlin, living in a refugee camp for several months. After Irene Dische heard him play Beethoven's Diabelli Variations, she arranged for him to record them for Deutsche Grammophon in 1991; Dische wrote the liner notes for the album. Ugorski signed an exclusive contract with the label.

Ugorski's international career was launched in 1992 when he was fifty years old and soon to be naturalized. His first concerts took place in the Milan Conservatory and at the Vienna Festival. He performed either solo or with orchestras such as the WDR Symphony Orchestra Cologne, the Czech Philharmonic, the Royal Concertgebouw Orchestra in Amsterdam and the Orchestre de Paris. He also regularly played at important festivals around the world, including the 1992 Salzburg Festival, where he played the Diabelli Variations, excerpts from Messiaen's Catalogue d'oiseaux, and Schubert's Wanderer-Phantasie.

From 1992 to 2007, Ugorski was professor of piano at the Hochschule für Musik Detmold, where he lived. He stepped in once more from 2010 to 2014, when his successor, Jean-Efflam Bavouzet, was on leave. Several of his students, namely Rinko Hama, Christian Petersen and his daughter Dina, became piano professors. He is remembered not only for performances but also inspired public lectures. He was also a member of the jury of the ARD International Music Competition in Munich.

=== Personal life and death ===
Ugorski was married to the musicologist Maja Elik; their daughter Dina was born in 1973, studied piano in Leningrad, and became a piano professor in Detmold and Munich. Dina died of cancer in 2019.

Ugorski died of cancer in Lemgo on 5 September 2023, at the age of 80.

== Recordings ==
Among Ugorski's most important recordings are Messiaen's Catalogue d'oiseaux, a recording earning an Echo Klassik prize in 1995, and Scriabin's Piano Concerto in F-sharp minor, Op. 20, with the Chicago Symphony Orchestra directed by Boulez. For this recording, Ugorski was nominated for a Grammy Award in February 2000. In 2005, he and his daughter Dina Ugorskaja recorded concertos for two pianos, Bach's Concerto for two harpsichords in C minor, BWV 1060, Mozart's Piano Concerto No. 10, and Shostakovich's Concertino in A minor, Op. 94. In 2010, he played the complete sonatas of Scriabin for Cavi-music. A reviewer noted that "from the suppleness of the playing here, you'd think you were listening to a teenager. The interpretation is a different story, and Ugorski's grasp of this music is clearly the result of decades of close study". Ugorski also recorded Shostakovich's Piano Quintet with the Delial Quartet for Oehms Classics in 2014. His complete recordings for DG were published as a set in 2018.

- Bach: Viol Sonatas BWV 1027–1029 – Yuri Kramarov, viola; Ugorski, harpsichord (1976, LP Melodiya C10 67925-26)
- Beethoven:
  - Piano Sonata, Op. 111; Bagatelles, Op. 126; Für Elise; Rage Over a Lost Penny, Op. 129 (1992, DG 435 881-2)
  - Diabelli Variations (1991, DG) OCLC 715702162
- Messiaen: Catalogue d'oiseaux (2003, 3CD DG) OCLC 716474039
- Moussorgski: Pictures at an Exhibition; Stravinski, 3 movements of Petrouchka (1992, DG 435 882-2) OCLC 887764660
- Schumann: Davidsbündlertänze, Op. 6; Schubert, Wanderer Fantasy, D.760 / Op. 15 (September 1992, DG 437 539-2) OCLC 66153796
- Scriabin:
  - Piano Concerto; Prométhée (1999, DG )
  - Piano Sonatas 1–10 (2010, 2CD Cavi-Music)
