= Op. 51 =

In music, Op. 51 stands for Opus number 51. Compositions that are assigned this number include:

- Arnold – Tam O'Shanter Overture
- Beethoven – Two rondos for piano
- Brahms – Two String Quartets
- Chopin – Impromptu No. 3
- Dvořák – String Quartet No. 10
- Elgar – The Kingdom
- Fibich – Šárka
- Holst – A Choral Fantasia
- MacDowell – Woodland Sketches
- Prokofiev – On the Dnieper
- Schubert – Three Marches Militaires
- Schumann – Lieder und Gesänge volume II (5 songs)
- Scriabin – Prelude in A minor, Op. 51, No. 2
- Sibelius – Belshazzar's Feast (Belsazars gästabud), theatre score and suite (1906, arranged 1907)
- Tchaikovsky – 6 Pieces for solo piano
