= Piano Sonata No. 8 =

Piano Sonata No. 8 may refer to:

- Piano Sonata No. 8 (Beethoven)
- Piano Sonata No. 8 (Mozart)
- Piano Sonata No. 8 (Prokofiev)
- Piano Sonata No. 8 (Scriabin)
