= Nocturne in A-flat major =

Nocturne in A-flat major may refer to:

- Nocturne in A-flat major, Op. 32, No. 2, by Frédéric Chopin
- Nocturne in A-flat (Scriabin) by Alexander Scriabin
