= Dina Ugorskaja =

German pianist (1973–2019)

- Born: August 26, 1973; Leningrad, Soviet Union
- Died: September 17, 2019 Munich, Germany
- Genre: Classical
- Occupation: Teacher
- Instruments: Piano; Harpsichord; Voice
- Years active: 1980–2019

Dina Ugorskaja (26 August 1973 – 17 September 2019) was a Soviet-born German pianist.

== Life ==
Dina Ugorskaja was born in Leningrad and grew up in a family of musicians. Her father was the pianist Anatol Ugorski. Maja Elik (1933–2012), her mother, was a musicologist who was born in Prague, where she and Ugorski were studying at the time. Ugorskaja grew up in Beltsy, Moldavian SSR. Her parents had first met in 1967 when they worked together on the Soviet premiere of Arnold Schoenberg's Pierrot Lunaire. Elik, who was working for a music publisher, had been engaged to produce a Russian translation of the work's German text.

Ugorskaja's first piano teacher was her father. She made her public debut when she was seven, performing at the Leningrad Philharmonia in 1980. Between 1980 and 1990 she attended the specialist music academy of the Leningrad Conservatory, studying piano and composition. Her piano teachers were her father and Maria Mekler, while she studied composition with, Yevgeny Irshay, the head of the piano faculty. Ugorskaja also studied singing with a focus on early music. She was 14 when she appeared in Leningrad for her concerto debut, performing Ludwig van Beethoven's Piano Concerto No. 4. In 1989, Ugorskaja made her public debut as a composer with the first performance of her string quartet at the Leningrad Philharmonia Hall.

The Perestroika years in the Soviet Union were accompanied by an increase in lawlessness and increasingly open antisemitism. Ugorskaja found herself targeted by racist threats from supporters of Pamyat, a Russian ultra-nationalist organization. When Ugorskaja was 16, she and her family relocated to East Berlin, where they arrived without their identity papers in order. At the time of her emigration to East Germany in 1988, the country was in the process of Die Wende, which eventually resulted in German reunification that augured well for her father's international career. Ugorskaja also enjoyed professional opportunities. She immediately applied for admission into the Hochschule für Musik "Hanns Eisler". She studied there between 1990 and 1992; her teachers were Annerose Schmidt and Galina Iwanzowa. Subsequently she moved on to the Hochschule für Musik Detmold where she studied again under Iwanzowa, and also as participated in a masterclass with Nerine Barrett. In 2001, she graduated to the post-graduate level concert exams ("Konzertexamen") degree. Ugorskaja retained close links with Hochschule für Musik Detmold, where she taught piano from 2002 until 2007, and held an associate professorship.

In 2007, she relocated to Munich. In October 2016, she accepted a post as professor of piano and harpsichord at the Ludwig van Beethoven Institute of the University of Music and Performing Arts Vienna. Ugorskaja died of cancer at her home in Munich on Tuesday 17 September 2019. A memorial service was held for her at the Beethoven Institute on 27 November 2019.

== Career highlights ==
Ugorskaja gave concerts in Germany, Russia, France, Austria and Ukraine. She played at the Leipzig Gewandhaus concert hall and at the Schwetzingen Festival. She also performed at a large number of other festivals, including the "Hitzacker Days of Music" ("Sommerliche Musiktage Hitzacker") festival and the Dijon Music Festival. Notable conductors with whom she appeared included Vladimir Jurowski, Peter Gülke and Frank Beermann. She performed regularly with the MDR Leipzig Radio Symphony Orchestra and the North West German Philharmonic Orchestra).

She teamed up with her father to issue a recording of concertos for two pianos by Bach (Concerto in C minor: BWV 1060), Mozart's Concerto No. 10 in E-flat major and the Shostakovich's Concertino for two pianos op.94. Further recordings followed, including one of the Beethoven First Piano Concerto with the Pforzheim-based South-west German Chamber Orchestra conducted, as in the case of her earlier two-piano concerto recordings with her father, by Vladislav Czarnecki.
