= Op. 49 =

In music, Op. 49 stands for Opus number 49. Compositions that are assigned this number include:

- Beethoven – Piano Sonatas Nos. 19 and 20
- Brahms – Wiegenlied
- Chopin – Fantaisie in F minor
- Elgar – The Apostles
- Klebe – Jacobowsky und der Oberst
- Krenek – Der Diktator
- Mendelssohn – Piano Trio No. 1
- Milhaud – Little Symphony No. 2
- Schumann – Romanzen & Balladen volume II (3 songs)
- Scriabin – Prelude in F major, Op. 49, No. 2
- Shostakovich – String Quartet No. 1
- Sibelius – Pohjola's Daughter (Pohjolan tytär), tone poem for orchestra (1906)
- Tchaikovsky – 1812 Overture
