= Piano Sonata No. 7 =

Piano Sonata No. 7 may refer to:

- Piano Sonata No. 7 (Beethoven)
- Piano Sonata No. 7 (Mozart)
- Piano Sonata No. 7 (Prokofiev)
- Piano Sonata No. 7 (Scriabin)
