= Violin Sonata No. 2 (Prokofiev) =

Sonata composed by Sergei Prokofiev

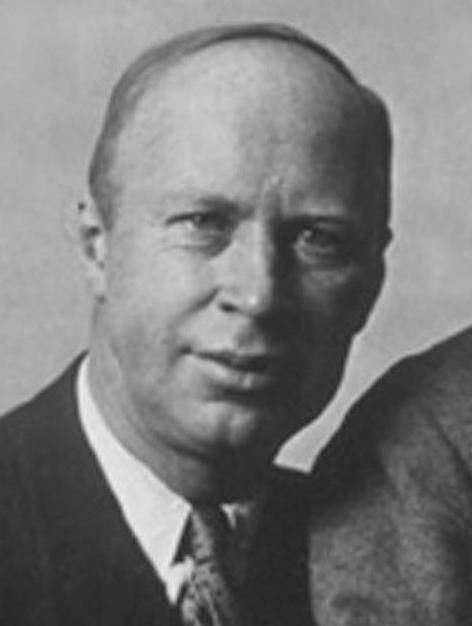
Sergei Prokofiev in 1936

Sergei Prokofiev's Violin Sonata No. 2 in D major, Op. 94a (sometimes written as Op. 94bis), was based on the composer's own Flute Sonata in D, Op. 94, written in 1942 but arranged for violin in 1943 when Prokofiev was living in Perm in the Ural Mountains, a remote shelter for Soviet artists during the Second World War. Prokofiev transformed the work into a violin sonata at the prompting of his close friend, the violinist David Oistrakh. It was premiered on 17 June 1944 by David Oistrakh and Lev Oborin.

== Structure ==
The work is about 24 minutes long and consists of four movements:

1. Moderato
2. Presto – Poco più mosso del – Tempo I
3. Andante
4. Allegro con brio – Poco meno mosso – Tempo I – Poco meno mosso – Allegro con brio

The work is highly classical in design as it opens with a sonata movement which is followed by a scherzo, a slow movement, and a finale. The violin part is replete with virtuosic display but is also highly lyrical and elegant, evidence of the work's inception as a sonata for flute.
