= Nerine Barrett =

Jamaican classical pianist and music professor

- Born: 3 February 1944 (age 81); Kingston, Colony of Jamaica, British Empire
- Other names: Nerine Barrett-Kanngiesser, Nerine Barrett-Kanngießer
- Occupations: Classical pianist; Academic teacher
- Organizations: Hochschule für Musik Saar; Hochschule für Musik Detmold; Trio Paideia

Nerine Barrett (born 3 February 1944) is a Jamaican classical pianist, one of the few black women who have achieved international recognition as a pianist. (Note: Mark Mitchell, in his book Virtuosi states that "no black women have achieved major international careers as classical pianists". Among the shortlist of black women he cites 13 known, who have played internationally "with distinction": Barrett, Armenta Adams, Monica Gaylord, Helen Eugenia Hagan, Hazel Harrison, Natalie Hinderas, Philippa Schuyler, Vivian Scott, Thomasina Tally, Flora Thompson, Lois Towles, Althea Waites, and Frances Walker-Slocum.) She was selected in 1966 by the Young Concert Artists to appear at Carnegie Hall and the following year won the Mozart Memorial Prize of the Haydn-Mozart Society of London. In the 1980s, she began teaching music as a professor at the Hochschule für Musik Saar and later at the Hochschule für Musik Detmold. She continued to perform both as a solo artist and as part of the Trio Paideia.

== Early life and education ==
Nerine Barrett was born on 3 February 1944, in Kingston, Jamaica to Mary M. (née McDonald) and Everald A. Barrett. She was the youngest of three sisters and had a younger brother. Her mother worked as a teacher and secretary and her father was a mathematician and physicist, who was the headmaster at Cornwall College. Barrett began to play the piano when she was two years old and performed on Radio Jamaica for her third birthday. She was first taught piano by Ena Helps and then studied with Trinidadian teacher Rita Coore. She attended Wolmer's Girls' School in Kingston.

In 1958, Barrett was selected along with Maxime Franklin to represent Jamaica as the country's performers at the West Indies Festival of the Arts in Port of Spain, Trinidad. She appeared as a guest artist with the Jamaican Philharmonic Symphony Orchestra for the organization's 20th-anniversary concert in 1960. The following year, based on a recommendation from Dame Myra Hess, she was awarded a government scholarship to study abroad in England with Ilona Kabos.

Moving to London in 1962 with Coore, Barrett studied for three years and began participating in piano competitions. In 1964, she placed third at the Casella International Piano Competition held in Milan and the following year was selected to play with the Birmingham Symphony Orchestra. In 1966, Barrett was one of the semi-finalists at the Leeds International Piano Competition, which led to performances as a soloist at the St Pancras Arts Festival and on BBC Radio. She also performed twice at the Royal Festival Hall conducted by John Barbirolli. Barrett was selected that year by the non-profit Young Concert Artists of New York City to be a touring artist for the company the following season.

== Career ==
Barrett debuted at Wigmore Hall in London in October 1967 and in November, she was honored with the Mozart Memorial Prize of the Haydn-Mozart Society of London. Later that month she began her first tour of the United States, opening at Carnegie Hall in New York City and then performing in Baltimore, Boston, and Philadelphia to critical acclaim. Barrett returned to Carnegie Hall in 1969 for the debut of the New Jersey Symphony Orchestra and then toured in Pittsburgh, Pennsylvania; Kansas City and St. Louis, Missouri; Dayton, Ohio; East Lansing, Michigan, and Montreal, Quebec, before performing two concerts with the Seattle Symphony. In 1970, she returned to Washington State and played with the Spokane Symphony for their celebrations of Beethoven's bicentennial and then with the Royal Liverpool Philharmonic. Home in London Barrett performed in several BBC Radio productions, before ending the season at the Marlboro Music Festival in Vermont.

In 1971, Barrett was the recipient of the first Michaels Award given by the Young Concert Artists. The award secured engagements for Barrett in the 1972 to 1973 season with the symphony orchestras of Baltimore, Boston, Chicago, Denver, Louisville, and St. Louis. She married Claus Kanngiesser, a German cellist, with whom she had two daughters, and moved to Germany. She continued to perform internationally, participating in the Marlboro Music Festival in 1973, with the Royal Philharmonic Orchestra in 1974, and in Washington, D. C. in 1975. In the early 1980s, Barrett began teaching at the Hochschule für Musik Saar in Saarbrücken. She continued to perform as a soloist and as a member of the Trio Paideia, with her husband as the cellist and clarinetist Hans Dietrich Klaus. In 1989, she was appointed a professor at the Hochschule für Musik Detmold, where she remained until her retirement.

Barrett was known for her Mozart playing, as reviewed by both The Guardian and The New York Times. Philip Hope-Wallace, critic for The Guardian, wrote that she offered "full singing tone in the slow movement and she did not let those handfuls of notes in the robust rondo slip through her fingers". She also received good reviews for her interpretation of Beethoven, Chopin, Prokofiev, Schubert, and Schumann. Her technical skill was known for its vivacity, rhythmic sense, secure touch, and tasteful presentation, devoid of showmanship.
