= Prelude in A minor, Op. 51, No. 2 (Scriabin) =

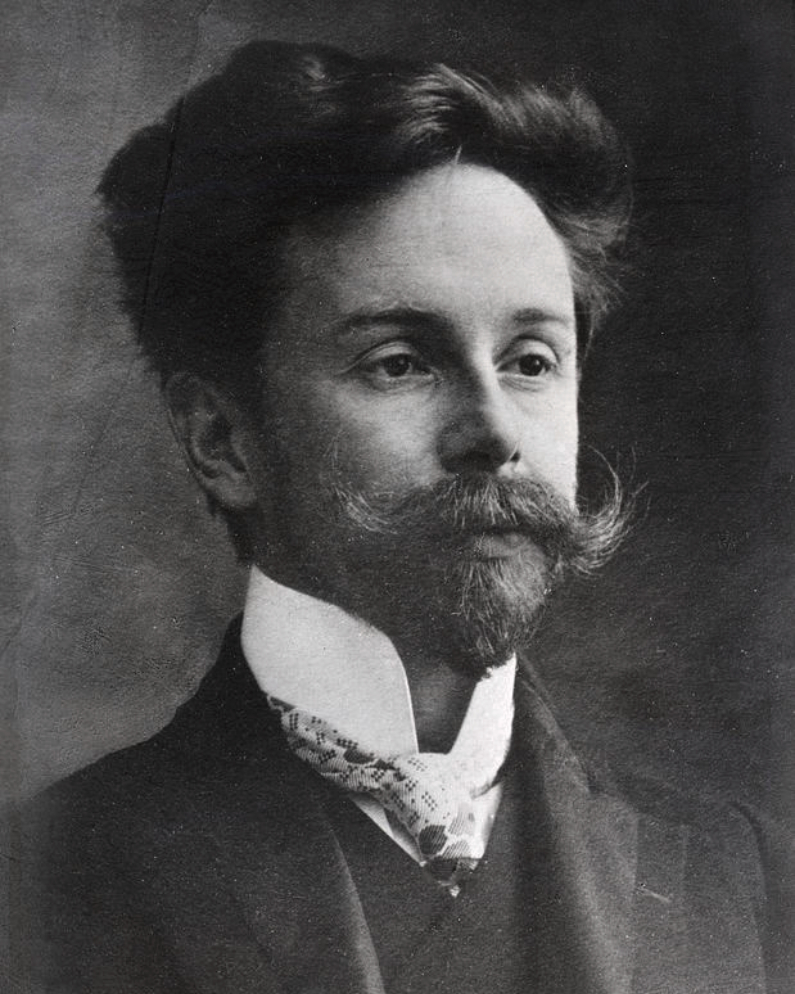
Alexander Scriabin in 1909

Alexander Scriabin's Prelude in A minor, Op. 51, No. 2 is the second of his Quatre Morceaux (Four Pieces) op. 51, published in 1906. It is notated in A minor. It is written in a 6/8 beat in 30 measures (plus upbeat) and should be expressed Lugubre (dire).

This is one of several pieces Scriabin never played in public (together with the Sonata No. 6 (op. 62)). He called it "Shattered Strings" (German "Zersprungene Saiten") when Leonid Sabaneyev reminded him of the piece during a discussion about minor and major. Sabaneyev quotes him with "Oh, let's not talk about this! This is a ghastly piece! [...] I was in an appalling situation back then. This Prelude, and also the Marche funebre in the First Sonata formed in moments disheartenment... But only these two!" (referring to his allegation that he had abandoned the minor tonality a long time ago).
