= Prelude, Op. 59, No. 2 (Scriabin) =

The Prelude Op. 59 No. 2 is one of the latest works written by Alexander Scriabin, it was completed in 1910, five years before his death. It is notated as "Sauvage, Belliqueux" (Savage/wild, belligerent).
