= Flute Sonata (Prokofiev) =

1943 composition by Sergei Prokofiev

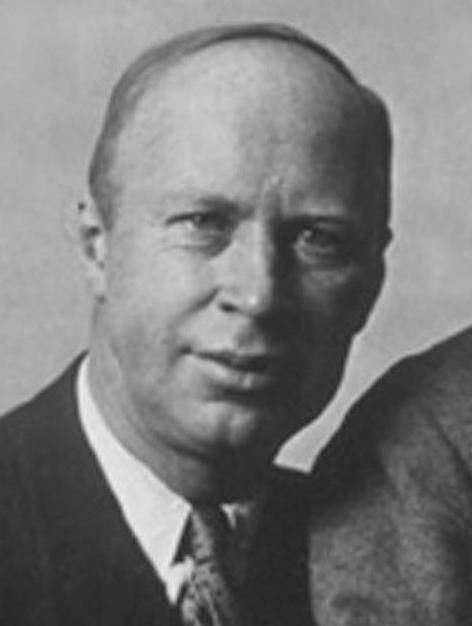
Sergei Prokofiev in 1936

The Flute Sonata in D major, Op. 94, is a musical work composed by Sergei Prokofiev in 1943. It was initially composed for flute and piano, and was later transcribed for violin as Op. 94a, both versions have been recorded several times. The piece contains four movements.

== History ==
The Flute Sonata in D was completed in the summer of 1943. At that same time, Prokofiev was working on music for "Ivan the terrible". The flute sonata in D was first performed in Moscow, Russia on December 7, 1943 by Nicolai Kharkovsky (flute) and Sviatoslav Richter (piano). It was later transcribed for violin in 1944, by the composer with the help of violinist David Oistrakh, as Op. 94a. The violin version was first performed by David Oistrakh (violin) and Lev Oborin, Piano, on June 17, 1944.

== Movements ==
There are four movements:

1. Moderato
2. Scherzo: Presto
3. Andante
4. Allegro con brio
