= Vivian Scott =

American classical pianist and music educator

- Scott at her 1946 graduation
- Born: Vivian Eileen Scott; 1926; Pontiac, Michigan, US
- Died: 2010 (aged 83–84); Southfield, Michigan, US
- Other names: Vivian Scott Ramsey
- Occupation(s): pianist, music educator
- Children: 2

Vivian Eileen Scott (1926–2010) was an American classical pianist and music educator. After obtaining an undergraduate degree from Howard University and a master's degree from Juilliard, she performed with distinction internationally throughout the 1950s. She was also involved in the desegregation of the Girl Scouts of the United States of America.

== Biography ==
Vivian Eileen Scott was born in 1926 in Pontiac, Michigan. She grew up in a home which included her mother, Mary Belle (née Riddick) Scott, sister Phyllis, her grandmother Bertha Riddick, her uncle Cedric Riddick and his family, and in her early years, her aunt Hortense Riddick. Scott gave her first piano recital at age 12. She completed high school in 1943 and went on to pursue music studies at Howard University. Graduating magna cum laude in 1946, Scott went on to continue her studies at Juilliard and completed her master's degree in 1949.

Scott married Andrew Ramsey around the time of her graduation and had two children, Rheva and Drew. In 1951, she appeared in two episodes of the Skitch Henderson Show and that year opened Howard University's season of concerts. In 1953, Scott was awarded the John Hay Whitney Fellowship and continued post-graduate studies in Paris. She returned to the United States the following year and performed at a benefit concert for the Harlem Mission Project. Her performance, described in the Paterson, New Jersey, Morning Call included Chopin's "Etude" Opus 24 No. 10 and "Polonaise", and Howard Swanson's "Sonata".

In 1955, Scott was granted a concert appearance by the philanthropic organization Jugg, Inc., which financed debut recitals for young, trained musicians. Her debut occurred at The Town Hall in New York City on March 20. She played works from Bach, Busoni, Chopin, Schumann, and Swanson in a two-hour event. In 1956, she became a faculty member of Howard University and moved from New York City to Washington, D.C. When she tried to enroll her daughter Rheva in her Michigan Park neighborhood Girl Scout troop, Scott was told there were no openings. She waited until the fall and tried again, but was told that the troop had decided that they would be a "white only" group. Scott wrote to the national headquarters to enlist their help in desegregating the Girl Scout Movement in Washington, D. C.

At the end of 1956, Scott appeared in Atlanta, playing selections of music by Albéniz, Czerny, Debussy, Mompou, Prokofiev, and Ravel, as well as Bach's Jesu, Joy of Man's Desiring, Chopin's Études, and Schumann's Davidsbündlertänze, leaving the audience "spellbound" by her "technical excellence". In 1957, she held a second performance at The Town Hall, containing much of the same repertoire as she had in Atlanta. The New York Times critic said of the Czerny Toccata Op. 92, "the brilliance of her playing and bravura spirit won shouts of approval" from the audience. She continued to play throughout the United States and Canada, into the early 1960s. Scott is remembered as one of the few black women who have played classical music on the piano internationally with distinction.
