= Piano Sonata No. 7 (Scriabin) =

Piano sonata written by Alexander Scriabin

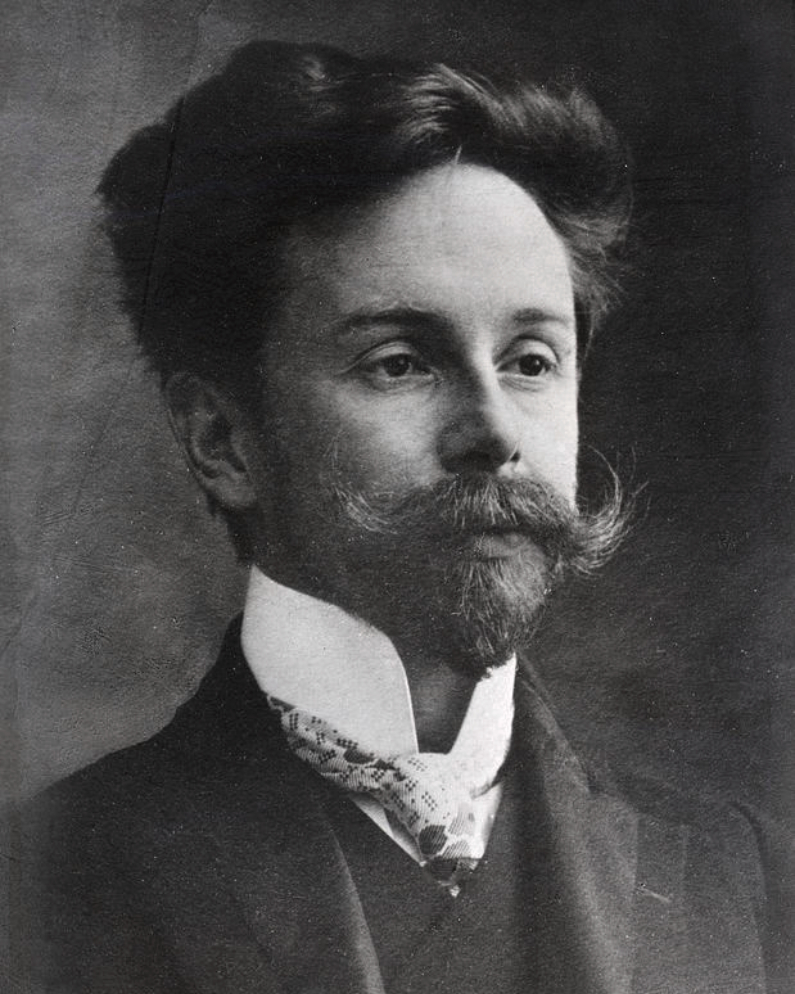
Alexander Scriabin in 1909

The Piano Sonata No. 7, Op. 64, subtitled Messe Blanche (White Mass), was written by Alexander Scriabin in 1911. The idea and the first sketches of the Sixth Sonata by A. N. Scriabin originated in a country house on the estate of Obraztsovo-Karpovo, Serpukhov district, Moscow province (now Bolshoe Obraztsovo, Stupino city district, Moscow region).

As one of the late piano sonatas of Scriabin's career, the music is highly chromatic and almost atonal. George Perle says that, "the primary set upon which the Seventh Sonata is based," is, in linear order as spelled by Scriabin, E, F♯, G, A, B♭, C, D♭, and that the mystic chord may be derived from the quartal spelling of this set (with D♮ and without G).

== Background ==
The White Mass is closely related to its predecessor, the Sixth Sonata. Both works were written in 1911–12 and have structurally and stylistically more in common than any other pair of Scriabin sonatas. Scriabin reportedly feared the Sixth Sonata, considering the work to be corrupted by demonic forces and going so far as to refuse to play the work in public. Scriabin composed his Seventh Sonata as an exorcism against the darkness of the Sixth Sonata, subtitling the work White Mass in order to reflect its celestial nature. He intended the mood of the piece to be ecstatic, evoking images of winged flight, voluptuous rapture and overwhelming forces.

The composer was especially fond of the piece, probably due to its messianic context and perfected structure, which features more contrast, rhythmic and dynamic, than most of his work. Like the Second Sonata however, the White Mass gave him a great deal of trouble during its composition.

The White Mass Sonata is not structurally directly related to Scriabin's Ninth Sonata, which was composed in 1912–13 and would later earn the nickname Black Mass Sonata.

== Structure and content ==
The piece consists of a single movement, lasting around 10–13 minutes, and is marked "Allegro," although the "Allegro" marking was added later by the publisher. The original tempo marking in Scriabin's hand at the top of the autograph score is "Prophétique." Additional markings provide clues to the different moods Scriabin intended to convey throughout the work, such as "mystérieusement sonore" (mysteriously sonorous), or "avec une sombre majesté" (with a dark majesty).

Like the Sixth, the Seventh Sonata is full of violent contrasts, complex counterpoint, advanced tritonal harmonies, and rippling, incandescent arpeggios. The theme marked "avec une céleste volupté" (with a heavenly voluptuousness) melodically presents a harmony that recurs throughout the sonata. Another recurring harmony is presented by the theme marked "étincelant" (sparkling).

Passages throughout the sonata imitate lightning, clouds of perfume, and distant bells. The chords imitating the ringing of bells were a favourite of Scriabin's, and they provide another harmony that recurs throughout the work (two minor thirds separated by a minor sixth). According to Leonid Sabaneyev, when Scriabin himself played these chords, the ringing sounded from near and afar at the same time; a part of them sounded very real, while another sounded like an echo.

There is also a significant five-octave arpeggiated chord at the end, representing a flash of blinding light. The music that follows surges upward in register until the end of the sonata where it dissipates, representing "enervation and nonexistence after the act of love."

== Performance history ==
The White Mass sonata is one of Scriabin's most advanced works. Notable Scriabin masters such as Vladimir Horowitz and Vladimir Sofronitsky did not play or record the piece. However, Sviatoslav Richter performed it a number of times throughout his career, and played it on tours as late as 1994. Marc-André Hamelin has both performed it live at many instances and his studio recording was released by Hyperion Records.

== See also ==
- Synthetic chord
- Romantic music
- 20th-century classical music
