= Sonata-Fantaisie in G-sharp minor (Scriabin) =

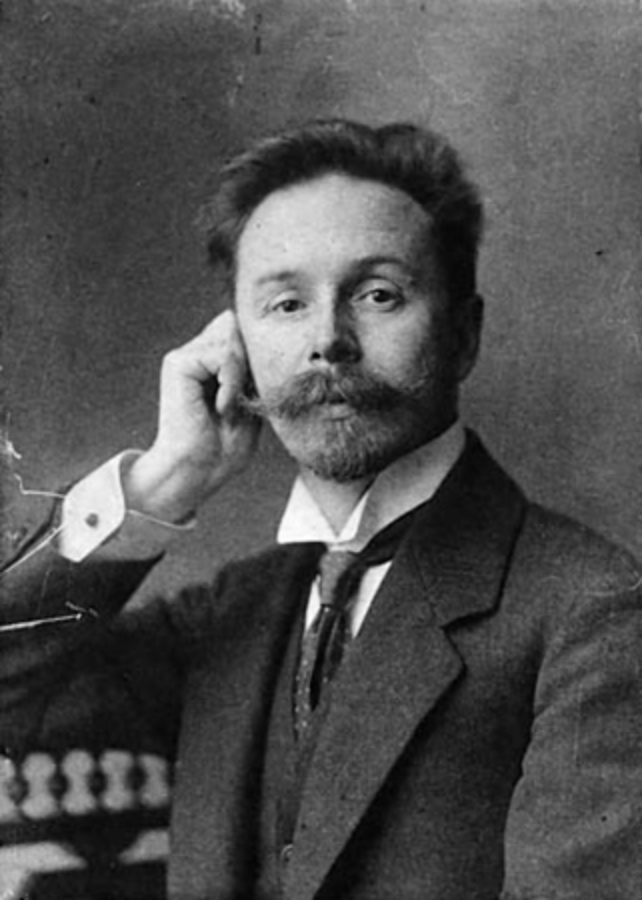
Alexander Scriabin

Alexander Scriabin's Sonata-Fantaisie (or Sonate-Fantaisie) in G♯ minor was composed in 1886, when he was 14. It is dedicated to Natalya Sekerina, the sweetheart of his adolescence.

The opening Andante gives way to a more agitated sonata movement. The cadence theme, especially on its return where it is accompanied by simple chords rather than flowing accompaniment figures, has a touch of a mazurka about it. The development section, with its broken tenths in the left hand and the polyphony in the treble, is very original in its sonorities. The end introduces a reminiscence of an ensuing idea in the introduction. Its chromaticism is highly characteristic of Scriabin's later works.

It was written during the time when Scriabin was studying under Nikolai Zverev.
