= Piano Sonata No. 2 (Scriabin) =

Piano sonata written by Alexander Scriabin

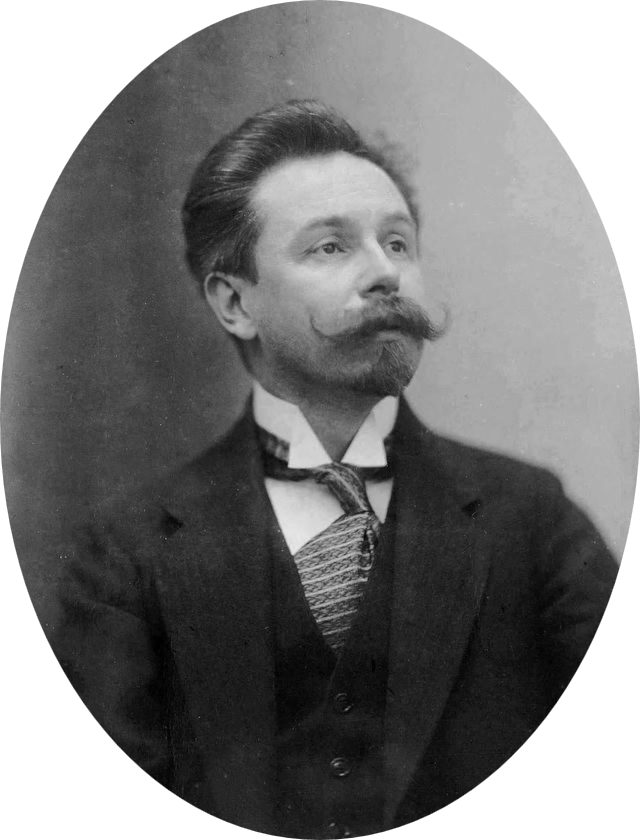
Alexander Scriabin in 1900

Alexander Scriabin began working on his Second Sonata, Op. 19 "Sonata-fantaisie" in Genoa in 1892 and completed it in the Crimea in 1897.

The seaside locations where Scriabin was working on the Sonata influenced its musical imagery. According to Scriabin’s biographer Yuri Engel, the Sonata had a program: ‘The first movement is a quiet southern night at the seashore. In the development - a dark, agitated, deep sea. The E-major section is caressing moonlight after darkness. The second movement (Presto) is the broad expanse of a restless sea.”

Scriabin himself premiered the work at the Salle Erard in Paris on the 5 May, 1896 and remained fond of the sonata throughout his career, performing it often, so much so that he recorded it on a piano roll for the Hupfeld company in 1908.

It is dedicated to the composer's first sweetheart, Natalya Sekerina, making it one of the rare few in his output to carry a personal inscription.

Typical of Scriabin's piano sonatas, it is technically and musically demanding for the pianist. A usual performance lasts between 11-13 minutes.

== History ==
The two movements were not conceived together. Scriabin wrote the Presto approximately four years before the first movement and the composition of the sonata took much longer than he had anticipated. In October 1895, Scriabin wrote to his publisher Mitrofan Beliaev and to the composer Anatoly Liadov that the sonata was almost finished. On 6 April 1896, he reported to Beliaev that it was done, only to revise it again. Two months later he wrote that he would send the score shortly, before admitting in a subsequent letter that "even though I've finished the Sonata, I am absolutely dissatisfied with it, despite seven rewrites. It looks like I'll have to forget about it for a while." He later told Beliaev he might set the work aside until the autumn. In a letter dated 27 July 1897, he stated tersely that the sonata was still not complete. In August of 1897, Beliaev writes to Scriabin: "Sasha, you've had the Second Sonata long enough. Don't fuss with it anymore." Two months later, the manuscript was finally sent to Beliaev that fall and published the following year in 1898.

=== Premiere ===
On the 5th of May, 1896, Scriabin premiered the Sonata at the Salle Erard, despite the work not being fully completed. The manuscript from 1896 shows, according to Faubion Bowers, "a number of blank spaces where his inner hearing has halted." At the premiere, Scriabin "had completed or improvised" the missing passages" and designates its key as "A flat" instead of "G#" on the program. He also makes the same mistake with the Prelude, Op. 11 No. 13, calling it F#, rather than G flat.

== Structure and title ==
The sonata is cast in two highly contrasting movements. The work's slow–fast structure parallels that of an earlier, unpublished sonata Scriabin composed in 1886, also titled Sonata-fantasie and also in G# minor.

The title "Sonata-fantasie" seems to reference Beethoven's Piano Sonata Op. 27 No. 2, subtitled Quasi una fantasia and commonly known as the "Moonlight" Sonata. The precedent of Beethoven's work afforded Scriabin the luxury of opening with a slow movement, an unusual structural choice that the "Moonlight" Sonata had helped legitimise. Scriabin's two-movement design also follows the same broad outline as several of Beethoven's two-movement sonatas, including Op. 90 in E minor and Op. 111 in C minor.

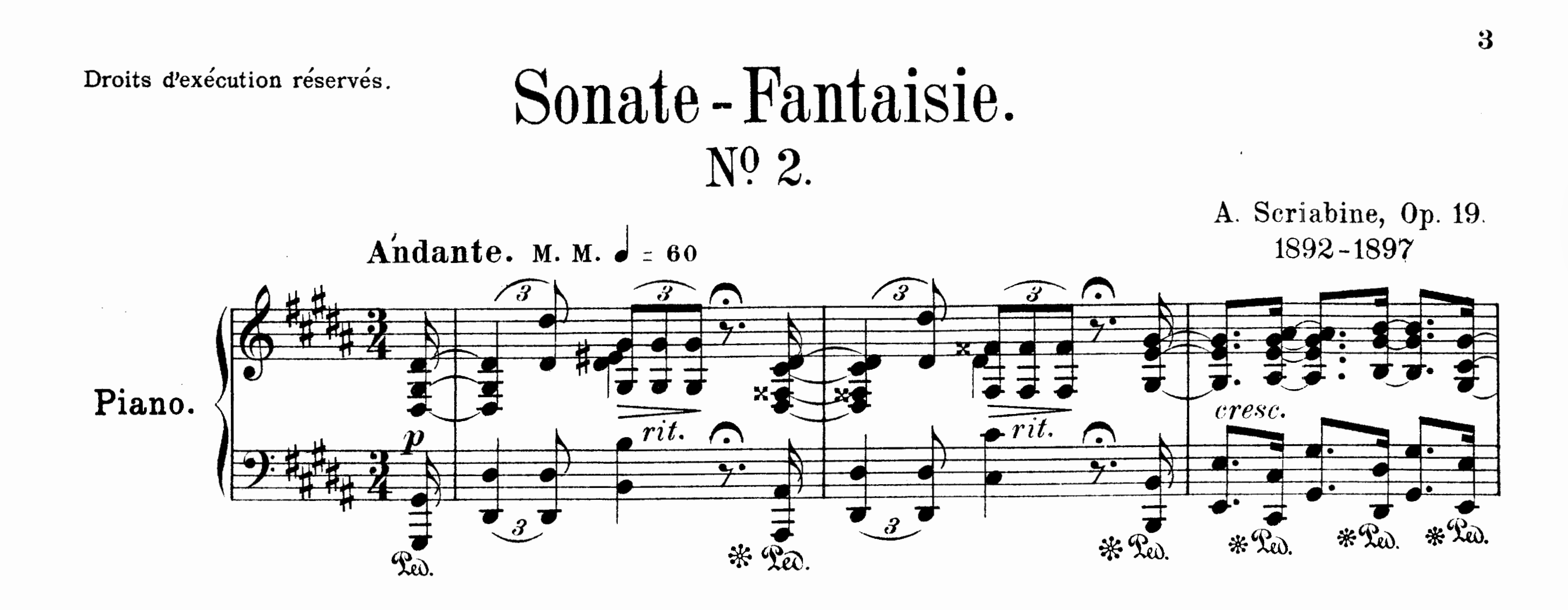
The opening bars of Scriabin's Piano Sonata No. 2 "Sonata-fantaisie" in G# minor

=== I. Andante ===
Exposition:

- Introduction: m. 1-12
- 1st subject: m. 13-18
- Transition: m. 19-22
- 2nd subject: m. 23-36
- Transition: m. 37-45
- 3rd subject: m. 46-51
- Codetta: m. 52-57

Development:

- m. 58-88

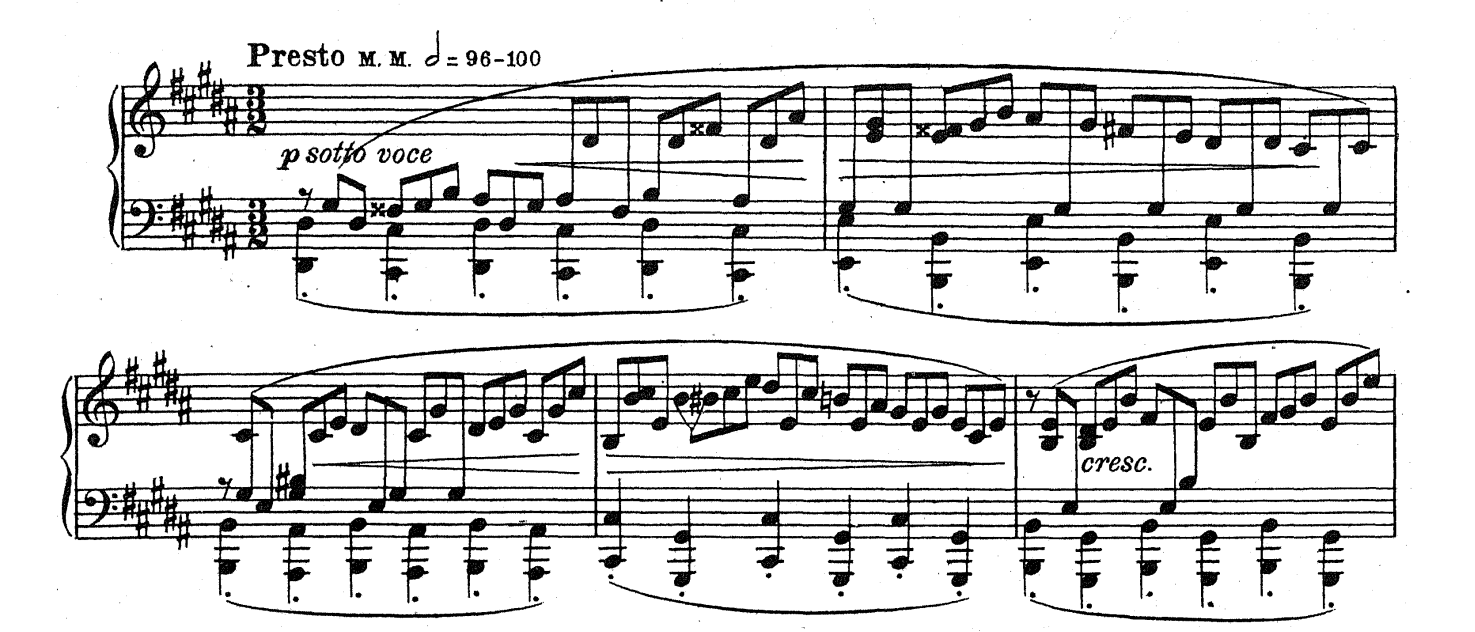
Opening measures of the Presto

Recapitulation:

- 1st subject: m. 89-94
- Transition: m. 95-99
- 2nd subject: m. 100-112
- Transition: m. 113-121
- 3rd subject: m. 122-127

Coda:

- m. 128-136

=== II. Presto ===
- A: m. 1-40
- B: m. 41-78
- A: m. 79-92
- Coda: 93-110

== Music ==
Scriabin included brief program notes and regarded the work as a vision of the sea.

"The first movement represents the quiet of a southern night on the seashore; the development is the dark agitations of the deep, deep sea. The E major middle section shows caressing moonlight coming after the first darkness of night. The second movement, presto, represents the vast expanse of the ocean stormily agitated."

The first movement is in sonata form. It opens with echoing effects, among them the three-note triplet figure that recurs throughout Scriabin's early output and appears also in the Piano Concerto Op. 20. Two lyrical themes follow: the first in G# minor, the subsequent two in B major, the relative major. After a short climactic development, the music modulates to E major (also C# minor) for the recapitulation, where the lyrical themes return with a slightly more elaborate accompaniment.

The second movement Presto stands in sharp contrast to the first: it is fast and intense throughout. Alternating crescendos and decrescendos evoke the impression of waves. The opening theme returns in varied forms, and in the Coda the interlaced treble lines are motivically derived from earlier material rather than purely decorative in function.

== Recordings ==
- Scriabin's Piano Sonata No. 2 in G-sharp minor, Op. 19 played by Maria Perrotta
