= Nocturne in A-flat (Scriabin) =

Alexander Scriabin's Nocturne in A♭ major was written from about 1884 to 1886 (when Scriabin was about twelve years old) and is without opus number. It was found in the estate of Nikolai Zverev by Leonid Sabaneyev and published by him in 1910 in the musical publication Muzyka.

The piece consists of 43 measures in 6/8 meter.
