= Piano Sonata No. 8 (Scriabin) =

Piano sonata written by Alexander Scriabin

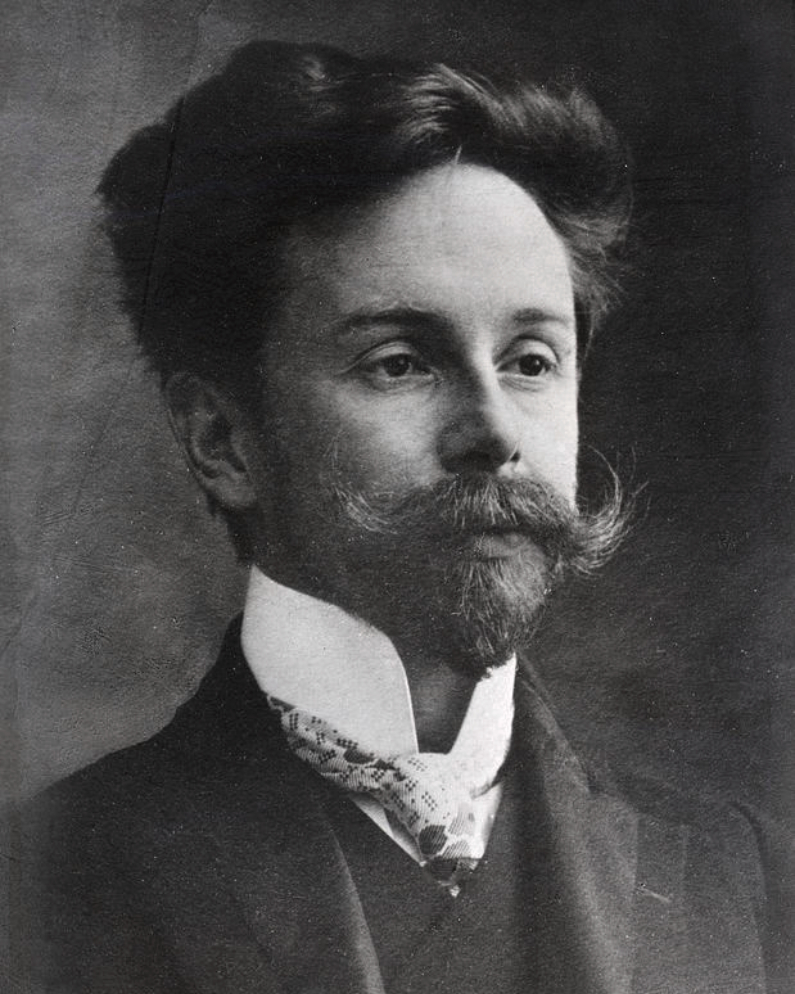
Alexander Scriabin in 1909

The Piano Sonata No. 8, Op. 66, by Alexander Scriabin, was composed between 1912 and 1913. As one of Scriabin's late piano sonatas, the Eighth Sonata features non-tertian harmony, though is arguably less dissonant than some of his other late works.

Like Scriabin's other late piano sonatas, the Eighth Sonata reflects the composer's mystical interests. Scriabin saw some parts of this sonata, which, like the Sixth Sonata, he never performed in public, as "the most tragic episode of my creative work".

== Structure and content ==
The Eighth Sonata consists of a single movement, and performances range from 10 minutes (Michael Ponti) to 18 1/2 minutes (Vladimir Stoupel). It is marked: Lento – Allegro agitato.

This work is regarded as one of Scriabin's most difficult pieces. It is the longest of Scriabin's sonatas by pages, and many passages are written on three and four staves to a system, as opposed to the typical two staves, to accommodate the complex counterpoint and large intervallic spaces. The character of the Eighth Sonata is perhaps consciously less extreme than that of the Sixth and Seventh, with fewer aggressive dissonances than the former and climaxes that do not explode with the extreme reckless energy of the latter.

The Eighth Sonata begins with almost disquieting placidity as a series of muted bell-like chords are sounded. This languid episode deciduates quite quickly into passages of agitated energy. There are none of the characteristic instructions common in Scriabin's other late sonatas. The furthest he goes is the word "Tragique" to indicate moments of distressed apathy and futility. In other respects, this is one of Scriabin's more formally experimental sonatas. It is rather episodic, with passages appearing at times to be sewn together almost arbitrarily, like the "presto" section which begins with staccato chords 'bouncing away' from the previous theme. There are definite moments of serenity (indeed this is the prevailing mood of the sonata), but a large portion of the music seems urgent and fervid. The composer Boris Asafiev argued that the themes in the piece represent natural elements

Like his Sixth Sonata, Scriabin never performed this sonata in public. He considered parts of it "the most tragic episode of my creative work", and described its harmony as "drawn from nature, as if it had existed before". Stravinsky described the piece as "incomparable."
