= Prelude in F major, Op. 49, No. 2 (Scriabin) =

Alexander Scriabin's Prelude, Op. 49, No. 2 is the second of his Trois Morceaux Op. 49 (Three Pieces), which were written in 1905. It is notated in F major, 3/4 measure, with a speed of 69 per quarter note, and lasts for 23 measures (and an upbeat). It should be expressed Bruscamente irato (very irate).

== Recordings ==
There are recordings by Glenn Gould (from 1973) and Mikhail Pletnev (from 1996).

- The Glenn Gould Edition: Chopin Piano Sonata No. 3, Mendelssohn Songs without Words etc. (S2K 52622) (also featured on volume 11 of the video Ecstasy and Wit (Sony SHV 48417)
- Mikhail Pletnev: Scriabin: 24 Preludes, Sonatas 4 & 10, etc. (2002)
