= Piano Sonata No. 9 (Scriabin) =

Piano sonata by Alexander Scriabin, c.1913

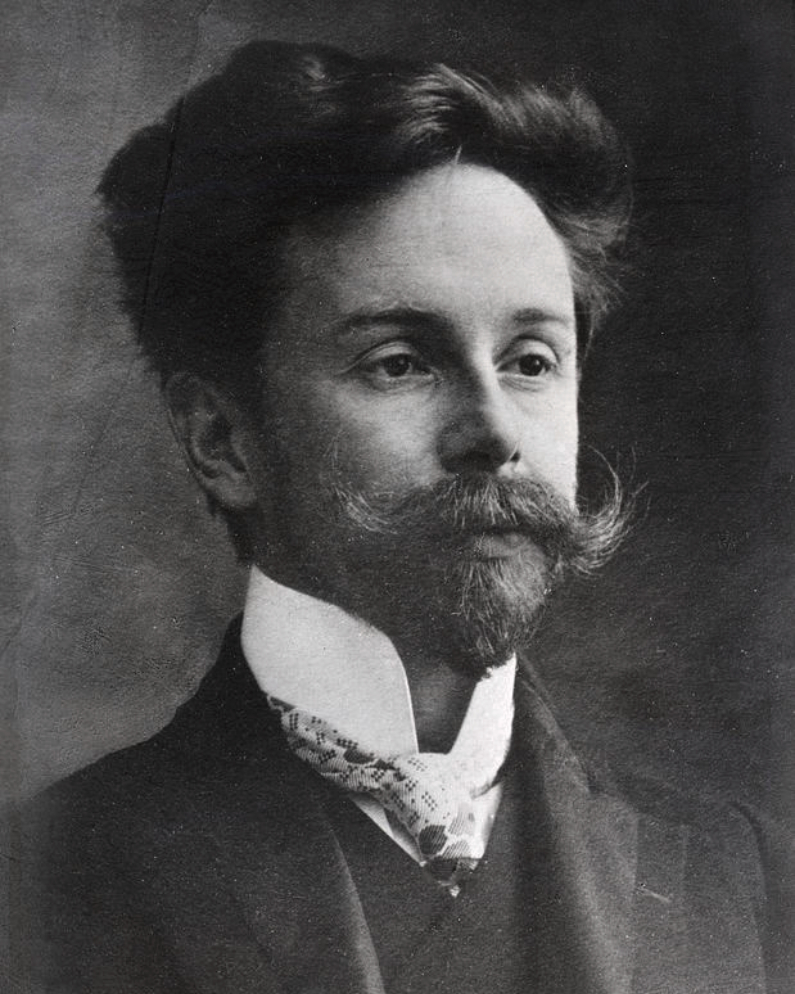
Alexander Scriabin in 1909

The Piano Sonata No. 9, Op. 68, commonly known as the Black Mass Sonata, is one of the late piano sonatas composed by Alexander Scriabin. The work was written around 1912–1913. Although its nickname was not invented by Scriabin (unlike the nickname White Mass given to his Piano Sonata No. 7), he approved of it.

== Structure and content ==
Piano Sonata No. 9, Op. 68
MIDI capture from piano performance (8:43)

The ninth sonata is a single movement. It typically lasts 8 to 10 minutes, and is marked as follows:

Moderato quasi andante – Molto meno vivo – Allegro molto – Alla marcia – Allegro – Presto – Tempo primo

Like Scriabin's other late works, the piece is highly chromatic. The Black Mass Sonata is particularly dissonant because many of its themes are based around an interval of a minor ninth, one of the most unstable sounds. Its marking legendaire captures the sense of distant mysterious wailing which grows in force and menace.

The opening theme is constantly transformed, from the early trill arpeggio's sounding unsettling and then completely shifting, eventually tumbling in rapid cascades into a grotesque march. Scriabin builds a continuous structure of mounting complexity and tension, and pursues the combination of themes with unusual tenacity, eventually reaching a climax as harsh as anything in his music. The piece ends with the original theme reinstated.

Like Scriabin's other sonatas, it is both technically and musically highly demanding for the pianist, sometimes extending to three staves as opposed to the standard two used in piano music.

== Recordings ==
One of Scriabin's better-known works, the ninth sonata has been recorded and performed extensively, notably by Vladimir Horowitz, Vladimir Sofronitsky, Vladimir Ashkenazy, Sviatoslav Richter, Andrej Hoteev, Garrick Ohlsson, Burkard Schliessmann and Pietro Scarpini.
