= Piano Sonata No. 6 (Scriabin) =

Piano sonata written by Alexander Scriabin

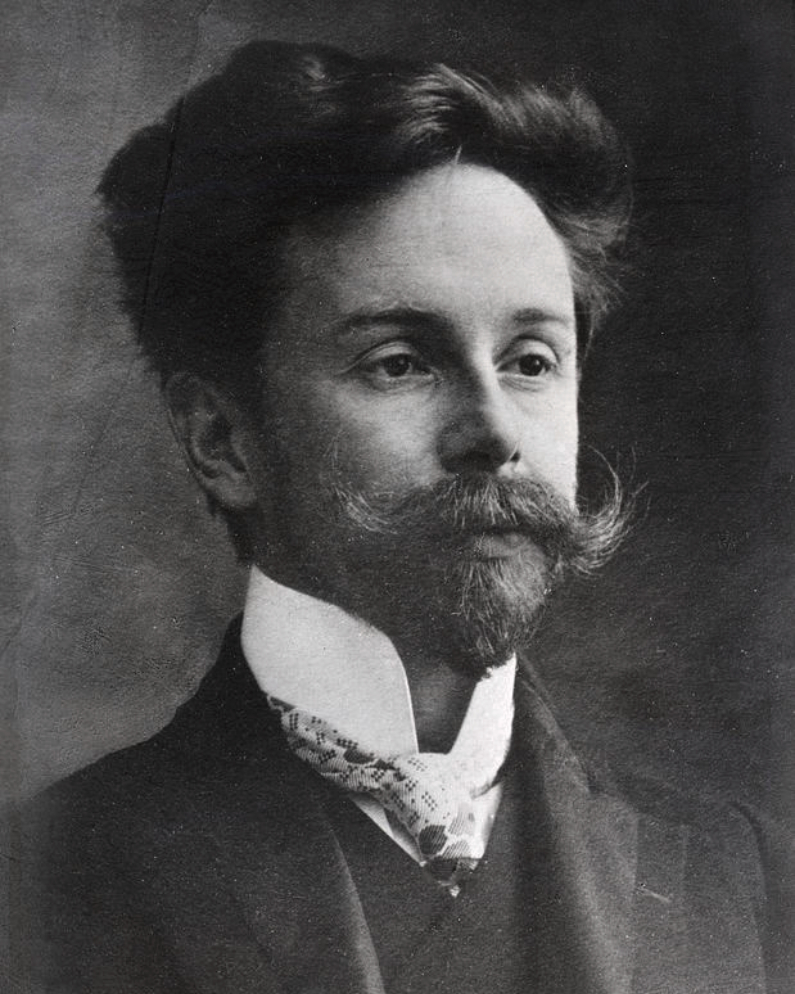
Alexander Scriabin in 1909

The Piano Sonata No. 6, Op. 62, by Alexander Scriabin was composed in 1911. Although it was named the sixth sonata, the piece was preceded by the Sonata No. 7. As it is one of the late piano sonatas of Scriabin's career, the music consists of a single movement and is almost atonal, although it is sometimes listed as being in the key of G. Scriabin reportedly never played the sonata in public, because he feared its darkness.

The idea and the first sketches of the Sixth Sonata by A. N. Scriabin originated in a country house on the estate of Obraztsovo-Karpovo, Serpukhov district, Moscow province (now Bolshoe Obraztsovo, Stupino city district, Moscow region). It received its premiere on 19 March 1912 in Moscow by Elena Bekman-Shcherbina.

== Structure and content ==
The piece consists of a single movement, typically lasting around 11–12 minutes, and is marked as follows: "Modéré: mystérieux, concentré". The mood of the piece is marked "mystérieux" by the composer, but most striking are the sudden moments of horror that interrupt its dreamlike atmosphere, explicitly marked "l'épouvante surgit" (surge of terror) by Scriabin. The final passages are colourful and languid, like an elaborate Debussy prelude, but darker forces are released at the end. Richard Strauss' Elektra chord is featured in the sonata, lending it a nightmarish quality that Scriabin's mystic chord could not provide alone.

According to Scriabin's biographer, Faubion Bowers, “The Sixth Sonata is a netherstar. Its dark and evil aspect embraces horror, terror, and the omnipresent Unknown. ‘Only my music expresses the inexpressible,’ Scriabin boasted, and called the Sixth's sweet and harsh harmonies, “nightmarish… fuliginous… murky… dark and hidden… unclean… mischievous.’ When he played excerpts for friends, he would stare off in the distance away from the piano, as if watching effluvium rise from the floor and walls around him. He seemed frightened and sometimes shuddered.”

It is one of a few pieces Scriabin never played in public, because he felt it was "nightmarish, murky, unclean and mischievous". He often started shuddering after playing a few measures for other people.

It is the first piece that the composer explored the use of the octatonic scale, a scale which has the structure of alternating half and whole steps. The music is demanding of the performer and sometimes the musical material is notated with three staves.
