= Piano Sonata No. 10 (Scriabin) =

Piano sonata written by Alexander Scriabin

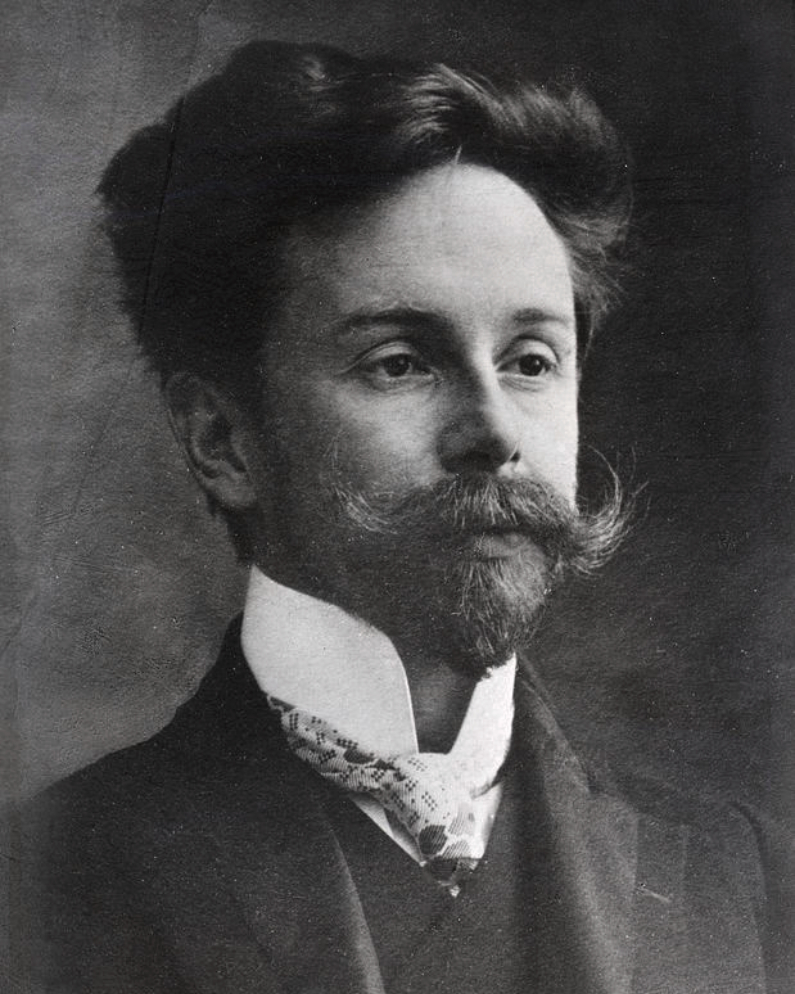
Alexander Scriabin in 1909

The Piano Sonata No. 10, Op. 70, was written by Alexander Scriabin in 1913. It was his final work in this form. The piece is highly chromatic and tonally ambiguous like Scriabin's other late works, although arguably less dissonant than most of his late works. It is characterized by frequent trills and tremolos.

Like Scriabin's other sonatas, it is both technically and musically highly demanding for the pianist. A typical performance is about 12 minutes.

== Name ==
It is sometimes called his Insect Sonata, in reference to the following statement he made that was recorded by Leonid Sabaneev:

Insects, butterflies, moths – they are all living flowers. They are the most subtle caresses, almost without touching...They are all born of the sun and the sun nourishes them... This sunlike caress is the closest to me – take my tenth sonata – it is an entire sonata from insects."

This statement originates in a conversation in which Scriabin, his common-law-wife Tatiana Scriabina, and Sabaneev discuss the ways that various animals "correspond to the movements of our souls." They are particularly interested in the types of caresses that different animals resemble - "birds correspond to elated caresses," while "harrowing caresses - these are beasts" - and the above quotation is prompted by Sabaneev somewhat jokingly asking Scriabin "and what about other living creatures, like worms, insects?." While many have taken the insect quote to refer to a literalistic resemblance between the sonata's trills and the buzzing of insect wings, the musicologist Ross Mitchell has argued that Scriabin intended a more nuanced and philosophical metaphor.

The insects that Skryabin had in mind while writing this sonata are not simply buzzing busybodies, but sun-kissed and sparkling with a dazzling gleam and an erotic delicacy as they caress with their gentle wingbeats. These insects combine many of Skryabin’s favored philosophical, symbolic, and metaphorical strains – ceaseless activity, fluttering, illumination, seduction – into one potent symbol for enabling spiritual enlightenment.

== Music ==
The atmosphere of the introductory pages of the Tenth Sonata is veiled and distant, like an impressionist reflection, but much more intensely elevated and spiritual. Trills soon sweep into every corner of the music, and in the last pages they are transformed into a glorious reverberation, as if shimmering with pulses of glowing light and taking on lives of their own. Such life and light/sound corroborations are typical of the composer's own imaginative world.

The Tenth Sonata is in closer dialogue with sonata form than some of his other sonatas. It opens with a few desolate notes, forming an augmented chord and then a diminished chord. Then, it moves on to a simple chromatic theme, and then back to the opening theme. Scriabin then introduces the luminous trills that pervade the rest of the piece, and then moves on to a third theme with a chromatically descending melody. Following the sonata format, these three themes take on a modified form in the development before settling down to the recapitulation.

During the middle portion, the feverish buzzing rises to a ferocious climax that thrusts both hands' trills into the upper register of the instrument. The very first, single-line gesture of the piece is not given again until after the richly-varied "recapitulation" has been made; it arrives quite unexpectedly, and is punctuated by a falling fourth in the bass that ends on C natural—a pitch that, in his last music, assumes great significance for Scriabin, who came to view it as a kind of cleansing tonal focus.

== Recordings ==
Notable recorded performances of this piece include that of Scriabin's son-in-law and musical champion, Vladimir Sofronitzky, and that of the great pianist Vladimir Horowitz, who also championed many of Scriabin's works throughout his long career. The Russian virtuoso Arcadi Volodos took the very unusual step of opening his Carnegie Hall debut concert with this Sonata, reflecting a daring approach to programming as well as a commitment to Scriabin's legacy. In 2018, Yuja Wang performed the Sonata in a recital tour, including Carnegie Hall and Berliner Philharmonie. The Berlin recital was recorded and released by Deutsche Grammophon as The Berlin Recital; the album received a Grammy Award nomination for "Best Classical Instrumental Solo".
