= On Guard for Peace =

1950 oratorio by Sergei Prokofiev

- Oratorio by Sergei Prokofiev
- Opus: 124
- Text: Samuil Marshak
- Language: Russian
- Composed: 1949–1950
- Published: 1952
- Publisher: Muzgiz, Hans Sikorski Musikverlage
- Duration: 37 minutes
- Movements: 10
- Scoring: narrators, mezzo-soprano, boy soprano, boys choir, mixed chorus, orchestra

Premiere
- Date: December 19, 1950
- Location: House of the Unions, Moscow, Russian SFSR
- Conductor: Samuil Samosud
- Performers: Natalia Efron, Anton Shvarts (speakers); Zara Dolukhanova (mezzo-soprano); Yevgeny Talanov (boy soprano); Boys Choir of the Moscow Choir School (Alexander Sveshnikov, choirmaster); Large Choir of the USSR All-Union Radio (Klavdiy Ptitsa, choirmaster); USSR All-Union Radio Symphony Orchestra

On Guard for Peace (Russian: На страже мира, romanized: Na strazhe mira), also translated as On Guard of Peace, Op. 124 is an oratorio by Sergei Prokofiev scored for narrators, mezzo-soprano, boy soprano, boys choir, mixed choir, and symphony orchestra. Each of its ten movements sets texts by Samuil Marshak, who had collaborated previously with the composer in the work Winter Bonfire, Op. 122.

Prokofiev composed On Guard for Peace under difficult personal circumstances. He had been among six composers censured by the Union of Soviet Composers in its 1948 Anti-Formalist Resolution on Music, which had immediate professional and financial consequences for him. The resulting stress exacerbated his chronic health problems from hypertension, which led to a stroke in 1949. Against his doctors' advice, Prokofiev wanted to compose a large oratorio on the theme of world peace, which he hoped would result in a paid commission from the Union of Soviet Composers or the Committee on Arts Affairs. With help from Alexander Fadeyev and Sergey Balasanian, Prokofiev was granted a commission for his oratorio from the children's programming division of the Radio Information Committee.

During the composition process, Prokofiev revised the name of the oratorio and some of its movements several times before settling on their final names. As in many of his late works, Prokofiev willingly amended his score according to the advice offered by his collaborators and friends.

On Guard for Peace was premiered on December 19, 1950, in Moscow; the performance was conducted by Samuil Samosud. It was received warmly in the Soviet Union, where it earned a Stalin Prize, second class, Prokofiev's last; it also signaled the beginning of his political rehabilitation. Discourse about the work in the West was affected by the Cold War and tended to be hostile. Its reputation there has remained mixed.

== Background ==
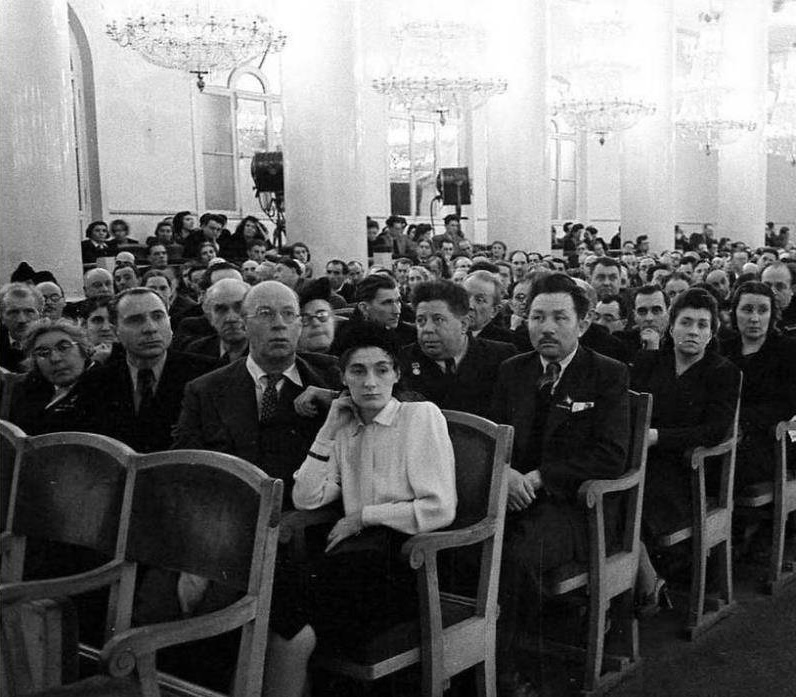
Sergei Prokofiev and his wife Mira Mendelson (front center) at the inauguration for the First All-Union Congress of Composers at the House of the Unions; April 1, 1948

The years spanning World War II and the immediate postwar were the most successful of Prokofiev's career. According to Sviatoslav Richter, Prokofiev "tirelessly replenished the treasury of the latest classical works" during this period. He was widely regarded as the leading composer of the Soviet Union and a living classic. By 1947, the number of distinctions and prizes he earned were unmatched in the history of Soviet music, on top of which were several foreign honors, including a gold medal from the Royal Philharmonic Society. His Sixth Symphony was premiered to widespread acclaim that year and was the last time any of his new music succeeded without need of outside intervention during the composition process.

On January 5, 1948, Joseph Stalin and members of the Politburo attended the Bolshoi Theatre for a performance of the opera The Great Friendship by the Georgian composer Vano Muradeli. The opera outraged Stalin for reasons that remain undetermined. He immediately directed Andrei Zhdanov to investigate the opera, which led to a wider campaign against musical formalism, during which Prokofiev emerged as one of the main targets. On February 10, Prokofiev and five other Soviet composers were censured by the Politburo in their 1948 Anti-Formalist Resolution on Music, which resulted in the banning of a number of his works, including previously lauded scores such as the Sixth and Eighth piano sonatas. With his music no longer performed or published in the Eastern Bloc, Prokofiev and his wife, Mira, had to rely on charity from friends in order to live. He was unable to maintain the loan that allowed him to purchase his dacha in Nikolina Gora and by August 1948, he had incurred a personal debt of R180,000. According to Marina Frolova-Walker, the punishment meted out to Prokofiev was arguably the harshest of all the censured composers, with its "devastating effect" leading to the "catastrophic deterioration of his health". He was out of official favor for a longer period of time than the other composers named in the resolution, an outcome which the failed reception of his opera The Story of a Real Man aggravated.

On July 7, 1949, Prokofiev had a stroke as a result of stress and chronic hypertension. Despite his declining health, Prokofiev insisted to his doctors, who strictly regimented his activities, that he be allowed more time to compose. One of them eventually gave way to the composer's demands:

One cannot keep an artist from creating ... the music will live in his soul, and the impossibility of writing it out will only worsen his moral and psychological state: "Let him live a shorter life, but as he wishes".

Prokofiev's health partially recovered in late 1949.

== Composition ==
=== Origin ===
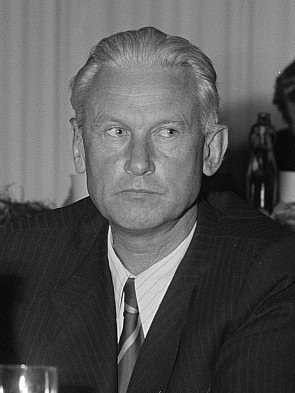
Alexander Fadeyev (pictured here in 1952) assisted Prokofiev in obtaining a commission and librettist for On Guard for Peace

Prokofiev had first expressed interest in composing a vocal-symphonic work on the topic of world peace while composing Winter Bonfire and the Cello Sonata earlier in 1949. He first discussed and developed the idea with Alexander Gayamov, a Russian-Armenian writer. Together, they devised an outline for a five-movement oratorio on a "broad Russian theme". It would have included an orchestral movement representing the Great Patriotic War, a recitative addressed to "the peoples of the world", a portrayal of "the citizens of the future" who protect the "ideal" of world peace, and ended with a choral apotheosis.

Prokofiev later explained in an article he wrote for Izvestia in 1951 that the oratorio's theme of peace "sprang from life itself" and his observations of "scenes from everyday Soviet life":

[On Guard for Peace] tells of the grim days of World War II, of the tears of mothers and orphans, of towns swept by fire, of the terrible trials that fell to the lot of our people; of Stalingrad and the victory over the enemy; of the radiant joy of creative labor, of the happy childhood of our children. In this composition I have sought to express my ideas about peace and war, and my firm belief that there will be no wars, that the nations of the world will safeguard the peace, save civilization, our children, our future.

In another article from that same year, Prokofiev said he was "possessed" with the need to contribute to the cause of peace:

"Everyone must fight for peace" is the main theme of the oratorio. [...] The ranks of peace advocates grow and grow stronger every day. They are stronger than all the instigators of war. They will block the path to war. The people of peace will stand up for peace.

On November 26, 1949, Prokofiev and his wife Mira attended the Moscow premiere of Dmitri Shostakovich's oratorio Song of the Forests. According to Mira, Prokofiev said "the oratorio was masterly, the instrumentation brilliant, but it was not rich in melodic material". Israel Nestyev wrote that Prokofiev was delighted by Shostakovich's scoring for children's choir, but felt it was used too infrequently. He first heard about Song of the Forests on July 1 from Levon Atovmyan, a mutual friend of both composers. With the success of Shostakovich's Song of the Forests, Prokofiev returned to the idea of composing a large-scale vocal-symphonic work, now clearly envisioned as an oratorio. He spent the closing months of 1949 preparing a program for the work and finding a librettist. Prokofiev's doctors warned him against taking on any more work, but he persisted as he hoped his proposal for an oratorio would result in a paid official commission from the Committee on Arts Affairs. Despite continuing health problems, Mira recalled that Prokofiev had a "burning, passionate desire to write [On Guard for Peace]" and that he resolved to complete as much music as he could:

[Prokofiev] did not like to talk about his illness. Nor did he like others talking about it. The only reason I am writing about it now only is because it was from autumn 1949 that he decisively changed his way of life, concentrating all his physical strength, and all the strength in his soul on the quickest possible fulfillment of his plans. "How much I could have, how much more I should have written", he told me in the last days of his life.

In January 1950, Prokofiev's health deteriorated again. Shostakovich interceded on Prokofiev's behalf and urged Vyacheslav Molotov to permit Prokofiev access to the Kremlin Hospital, which was granted on February 17. New doctors and caregivers confined the composer to his bed, prohibited him from working, and confiscated his manuscript paper; he then sketched his ideas on napkins that he hid under his pillow. By this time, he had started collaborating on the oratorio's libretto with the novelist Ilya Ehrenburg, who was unsure whether to proceed further with the project as he had never worked with a composer before.

Prokofiev was released from the hospital on April 3 and immediately traveled to Barvikha where he checked into a local sanatorium. (Note: Simon Morrison incorrectly states that Prokofiev's release date was April 20, 1950, but Mira Mendelson's diary entry for April 20 records that she had picked up Prokofiev on April 3, and "went straight to Barvikha" on that day) While convalescing, he was visited by the writer Alexander Fadeyev, a member of the Central Committee of the CPSU and Supreme Soviet. Fadeyev then told Sergey Balasanian, deputy director of the Radio Information Committee in charge of programming, to approve the commission of an oratorio from Prokofiev for the children's programming division. The composer attempted to negotiate an advance through Atovmyan, but was informed that it could only be offered once the score was completed and presented.

=== Finding a librettist ===
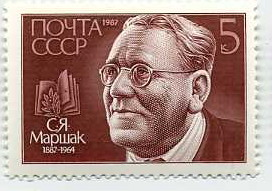
Samuil Marshak depicted on a 1987 Soviet stamp

Ehrenburg agreed to work on the oratorio and had promised to have the libretto ready for Prokofiev by the beginning of March 1950. However, on March 4, Prokofiev wrote a letter to his wife complaining that he still had not received the libretto.

Prokofiev kept working intermittently during his convalescence, preparing what ultimately became On Guard for Peace while simultaneously revising and editing the piano score for his ballet The Tale of the Stone Flower. Additionally, on March 29, Prokofiev received a letter from his wife informing him that Grigori Aleksandrov wanted him to compose the score for his forthcoming film, Kompozitor Glinka, and was prepared to accommodate the composer's wishes, including paying him at the "highest rate". Prokofiev seriously considered the offer, at one point expressing the hope that the film score could provide the basis for a future opera. The film's depictions of Mikhail Glinka's professional failures led Prokofiev to reflect on the neglect of his own operas; he ultimately declined Aleksandrov's offer.

On May 11, Prokofiev met with Fadeyev and Nikolai Tikhonov to discuss Ehrenburg's libretto. The composer also invited his father-in-law Abram Mendelson, whom he regularly consulted on political matters, to the meeting. Ehrenburg's libretto—which consisted of twelve sections and set the oratorio in a hypothetical Soviet Union devastated by preemptive nuclear strikes launched by the United States with the assistance of NATO—shared similar themes with his recent novel, The Ninth Wave. The libretto described Western financiers celebrating the North Atlantic Treaty and "traders of death" goading for nuclear warfare, but these are ultimately thwarted by a global coalition of nations led by the Soviet Union. "Peace will defeat war", it concluded.

Fadeyev said the scenario was "interesting", but that it seemed more appropriate for a film script than an oratorio libretto. He was displeased with Ehrenburg, who was considered politically "unreliable" at the time, and cautioned Prokofiev against setting his text. Fadeyev had already approached Tikhonov about writing the libretto instead, but the latter refused citing his lack of experience in children's literature. His next choice was Samuil Marshak, a celebrated writer for children and translator of Shakespeare, who accepted the offer. Fadeyev supervised the project in order to ensure that the pacifist and militarist themes in the oratorio were agreeably balanced; Prokofiev requested alterations to the libretto from him, not Marshak.

=== Collaboration and personal challenges ===
On May 18, Prokofiev was discharged from the sanatorium in Barvikha and returned to his dacha in Nikolina Gora. Fadeyev approved the use of chorus and children's voices in On Guard for Peace, but told composer and librettist to refrain from treacly sentiments. Although Fadeyev was generally obliging, he rejected a number of ideas, including music representing the chirping of crickets in the "Lullaby" movement. The name for the oratorio also changed several times during its creation: from Glory to Peace, The War for Peace, A Word On Peace, and In Defense of Peace, to the final choice of On Guard for Peace.

Beginning in June, Prokofiev's neighbor and longtime friend Nikolai Myaskovsky, who had been diagnosed with cancer in 1949, became terminally ill. His death on August 8 devastated Prokofiev, who was prohibited by his doctors from attending the memorial service at the Moscow Conservatory. On August 28, Prokofiev himself had a medical emergency: his wife returned from an outing to find him laying on the couch feeling dizzy, bleeding profusely from his nose, and with low blood pressure. Finding proper medical attention in Nikolina Gora was difficult; Prokofiev was finally aided by a neighbor who was a surgeon. She suggested to the couple that they return to Moscow in order to be closer to emergency medical services; they heeded her advice.

Despite these personal crises, Prokofiev focused on completing On Guard for Peace. He was pleased that Marshak worked quickly and was yielding to modifications to his libretto. The collaboration's focus shifted onto the music; specifically with outlining which sections would highlight the vocal soloists, the choruses, or the orchestra, whether individually or combined. On August 11, Prokofiev reported to Fadeyev that the music for the oratorio was complete and that he expected to finish orchestrating the last third of the score by October. A piano reduction for study had been given to Samuil Samosud, who was designated to conduct the premiere.

Although Prokofiev had completed the music, On Guard for Peace was submitted to a number of additional modifications from Samosud; apart from Prokofiev, his contribution to the score was the most extensive. While Fadeyev kept its libretto and music from becoming too sentimental, Samosud urged the opposite in order to better represent "the enchanting beauty of Communism" before the peoples of the world. The conductor suggested the addition of a populist number for boy soprano at a crucial dramatic point in On Guard for Peace and releasing doves during the premiere performance. The latter was rejected by the management of the House of the Unions, the venue chosen for the premiere, but the former was accepted; in response, Marshak wrote the poems "A Letter From an Italian Boy" and "A Lesson in One's Native Language". "A Letter From an Italian Boy" was about a schoolboy who decried the shipment of armaments from the United States to Italy; "A Lesson in One's Native Language", which Prokofiev chose to set, described schoolchildren in a Moscow classroom writing the phrase "Peace to all peoples of the world" over and over again on a chalkboard.

A private performance in September at the headquarters for the Radio Committee resulted in Atovmyan, Balasanyan, Samosud, and Klavdiy Ptitsa, the choirmaster for the Chorus of the USSR All-Union Radio, joining to request further alterations to the choral parts in order to mitigate the difficulty of their harmonies. To their surprise, Prokofiev yielded without dispute.

Even after acquiescing to numerous suggestions and demands that would make On Guard for Peace more acceptable to the political environment of the time, Prokofiev privately worried whether the audience would respond positively to it. While working on modifying and simplifying the oratorio, he regularly studied Shostakovich's Song of the Forests for comparison. Continued illness prevented him from attending the rehearsals, but he was regularly kept up to date on them by Samosud. Mira recalled that Samosud had privately expressed his concerns about the work to her:

Samosud was worried. Trembling, agitated. I asked him directly how he himself felt about the music. He was very complimentary about it, but said it might not be immediately understood, that they now want to hear music that is simple. [...] Samosud's fluctuations of mood reflected the vacillating or simply negative attitudes of a number of musicians on whom the performance depended. This became especially evident after [Samosud] told me, "If I feel that the outlook for the oratorio is bad, I will simply say that I am sick and unable to conduct". This meant that the performance of the oratorio could fail. [...] [A]t the same time, I knew how devastatingly such a failure would upset [Prokofiev], because I knew how dearly [he] felt about the work, how he scrambled to compose it, seeing it as his duty—the duty of a modern artist, how hard he worked.

In the days before the world premiere, Mira attended the rehearsals on behalf of Prokofiev. She was joined at one of them by Galina Ulanova, who had created the role of "Juliet" in the Kirov Theatre's 1940 production of Romeo and Juliet.

== Music ==
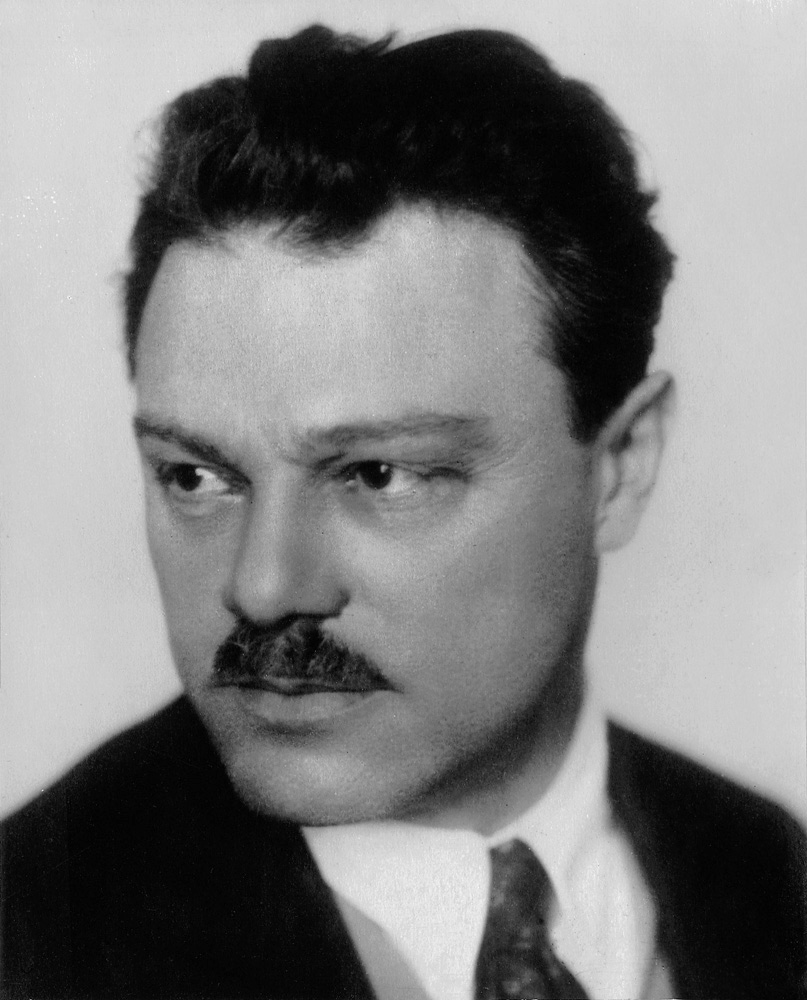
Samuil Samosud (pictured here in the 1930s) conducted the premiere of On Guard for Peace and offered advice during its composition

=== Movements ===
On Guard for Peace consists of ten movements.

1. "Barely Had Earth Recovered From the Thunder of War" (Andante mosso) (mixed choir and orchestra)
2. "Those Who Are Ten Years Old Today Remember the Nights of War" (Allegro moderato) (boy soprano, boys choir, mixed choir, and orchestra)
3. "City of Glory: Stalingrad" (Allegro moderato) (boys choir, mixed choir, and orchestra)
4. "May the Reward of Heroes be Enduring Peace on Earth" (Andante maestoso) (mixed choir and orchestra)
5. "We Do Not Want War" (Allegro) (boy soprano, boys choir, mixed choir, and orchestra)
6. "Dove of Peace" (Allegro moderato giocoso) (boys choir and orchestra)
7. "Lullaby" (Adagio) (mezzo-soprano, boys choir, mixed choir, and orchestra)
8. "At the Peace Festival" (Moderato animato) (boys choir, mixed choir, and orchestra)
9. "Radio Conversation" (narrators)
10. "The Entire World is Ready to Wage War Against War" (Moderato energico) (boys choir, mixed choir, and orchestra)

A typical performance takes approximately 37 minutes.

=== Instrumentation ===
The orchestra consists of the following instruments:

Woodwinds
3 flutes (3rd doubling piccolo)
3 oboes (3rd doubling English horn)
4 clarinets (4th doubling E-flat clarinet and bass clarinet)
3 bassoons (3rd doubling contrabassoon)
Brass
4 French horns
3 trumpets
3 trombones
tuba

Percussion
timpani
triangle
tambourine
snare drum
bass drum
woodblock
cymbals
tam-tam
glockenspiel
xylophone
Keyboards
celesta
piano

Voices:
2 narrators
mezzo-soprano
boy soprano
boys choir
mixed chorus

Strings
harp
1st violins
2nd violins
violas
cellos
double basses

== Reception ==
=== Premiere and Soviet appraisals ===
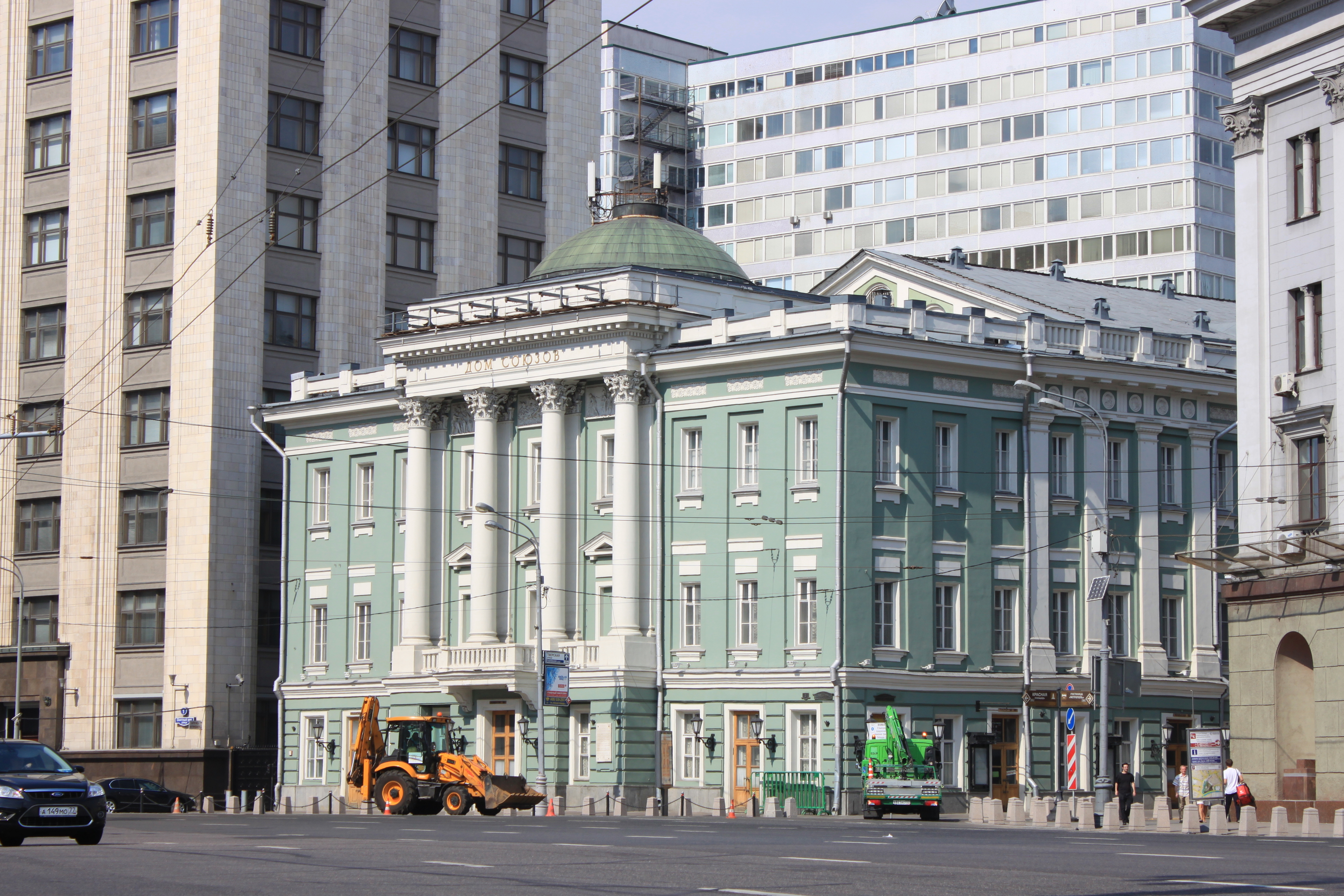
The premiere of On Guard for Peace took place at the House of the Unions in Moscow

On Guard for Peace was premiered on December 19, 1950, at the House of the Unions in Moscow. The performers were narrators Natalia Efron and Anton Shvarts, mezzo-soprano Zara Dolukhanova, boy soprano Yevgeny Talanov, the Boys Choir of the Moscow Choir School (Alexander Sveshnikov, choirmaster), Large Choir of the USSR All-Union Radio (Klavdiy Ptitsa, choirmaster), and the USSR All-Union Radio Symphony Orchestra conducted by Samosud. The oratorio was performed together with Prokofiev and Marshak's other collaboration, Winter Bonfire. The performance was a success, with prolonged applause following the middle movements. Nestyev later wrote that the oratorio had "stirred the audience with its vital and timely significance". He praised both Prokofiev and Marshak for the originality of their treatment of the central theme of world peace, but also complained about the "occasional wordiness" of the libretto.

Prokofiev attended the premiere alone because his wife was ill; she stayed at home where she listened to the broadcast of the performance with her father. Mira recalled that Prokofiev returned in a good mood and shared his impressions of the performance for a long while. He expressed gratitude for the kindness Samosud had shown him, then made humorous impersonations of the boy soprano Talanov. Later, Samosud called to ensure Prokofiev had arrived home safely; he told Mira about the glowing response to the oratorio. "They pretend that Prokofiev's music is incomprehensible", he told her, "but if only you had seen how joyfully they applauded him!" After the concert, Prokofiev was congratulated on his success by various collaborators, dignitaries, and admirers; among them Fadeyev. Prokofiev thanked him for his help and told him "You have really lifted my spirits".

In 1951, both On Guard for Peace and Winter Bonfire were nominated for a Stalin Prize, with the unanimous support of the prize committee's music division, possibly in deference to Prokofiev's declining health. Vladimir Zakharov said that whatever lingering traces of the "old Prokofiev" remained in the oratorio were atoned for by the "new Prokofiev". In spite of the prize committee's approval of both scores, Vladimir Kruzhkov from Agitprop disagreed with the suitability of awarding On Guard for Peace, saying that "in many episodes the music does not fit the text and contains elements of formalism". Agitprop then made a counter proposal to award a Stalin Prize, third class to Winter Bonfire only. In the end, the prize committee's original decision to award both Prokofiev works prevailed, an outcome Khrennikov took credit for:

When Prokofiev wrote On Guard for Peace, there was a lot of formalism there, but the government asked: "Has he taken a step towards regeneration?", and I said, yes, and not just one step, but two. And I was told: "If so, he has to be supported".

The 1952 Stalin Prize was the sixth and final one Prokofiev earned. According to David G. Tompkins, On Guard for Peace was an "important milestone" in Prokofiev's political rehabilitation in the Soviet Union. Its success made possible subsequent commissions from the Radio Information Committee that helped to further repair Prokofiev's reputation, including The Meeting of the Volga and the Don and the Seventh Symphony.

=== Western appraisals ===
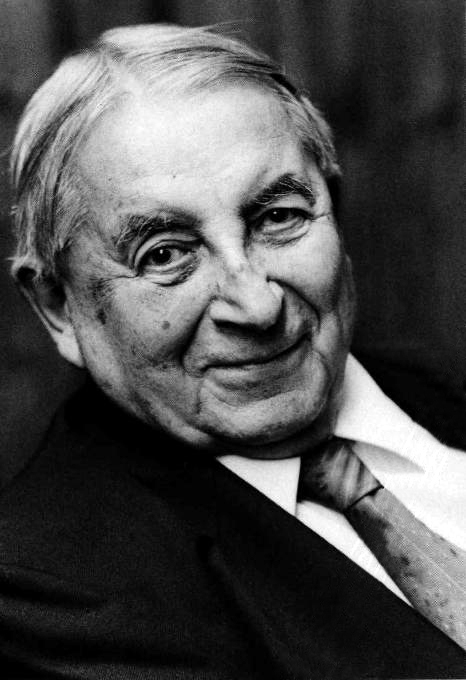
Nicolas Slonimsky wrote that On Guard for Peace was stylistically consistent with the rest of Prokofiev's work, despite its concessions to officialdom

On Guard for Peace, arriving at the height of the Cold War and the Second Red Scare, left most Western music critics of the time unimpressed. Time wrote that "Prokofiev once composed a charming piece for children called Peter and the Wolf", but that in On Guard for Peace "his latter-day Peter comes across a new species of wolf: the sinister, evil voices of the warmongers and Wall Street merchants on their way to Korea, carrying hundreds of thousands of death-dealing bombs. [The oratorio]'s enthusiastic conclusion: 'The children's best friend and protector lives in the Kremlin.'" A column by John O'Donnell published in the New York Daily News dismissed the oratorio as "Kremlin music" and criticized the creation of a "party-line" work so soon after the start of the Korean War.

Other commentators were skeptical of Prokofiev's sincerity. An article in the Louisville Courier-Journal speculated that On Guard for Peace was among the works that Prokofiev—"a confident, cynical man of the world"—composed "quite coolly to conform". In their obituary of Prokofiev, the Montreal Star called On Guard for Peace "quite obviously tongue-in-cheek" and that it showed its composer "went through the motions of conformity".

After the 1950s, opinions towards On Guard for Peace turned more conciliatory. Nell Lawson, reviewing for the Buffalo News a recording of the oratorio conducted by Gennady Rozhdestvensky, described it as "great music by a composer who had his own travail at the hands of the leaders of his day and a monument to his bravery". Linda Norris, writing for the Biggs News, praised the oratorio's tone as "positive, with an optimistic spirit conveyed in the voices of children", and added that the "music [was] stirring and the words touching", although she warned her readers against being "completely taken in" by its political message. Similarly, Jack Rudolph in the Appleton Post-Crescent wrote that the oratorio was "powerful propaganda" and that "as long the piece is recognized for what it is it can be appreciated and enjoyed on musical terms".

Nevertheless, On Guard for Peace still attracts detractors. Boris Schwartz wrote that the 1948 resolution "went deeper than some day-to-day adversities—they are reflected in the music of Prokofiev's last five years", and held up the oratorio as an example:

The official drive against "formalism", the simplistic stress on tunefulness and accessibility elevated musical insipidness to a status symbol. Prokofiev had loathed all such trends throughout his life; now he had barely the strength or spirit to fight back. The problems worked in his mind; he became doubtful, he listened to the advice of friends and colleagues while in his youth he had recognized no judgment but his own.

In 1999, one writer reviewing a recording conducted by Yuri Temirkanov called the oratorio "Stalinist era kitsch at its most egregious", while another said that the work "makes the prospect of world harmony seem downright terrifying".

Nicolas Slonimsky disagreed with dismissals of On Guard for Peace. He wrote that "Prokofiev retains even in this score his typical style". Although he said the oratorio "may be legitimately classified as serving the official ideology of the Soviet Union", he listed commonalities the score shared with earlier works such as Peter and the Wolf, The Love for Three Oranges, and the Scythian Suite.

== Legacy ==
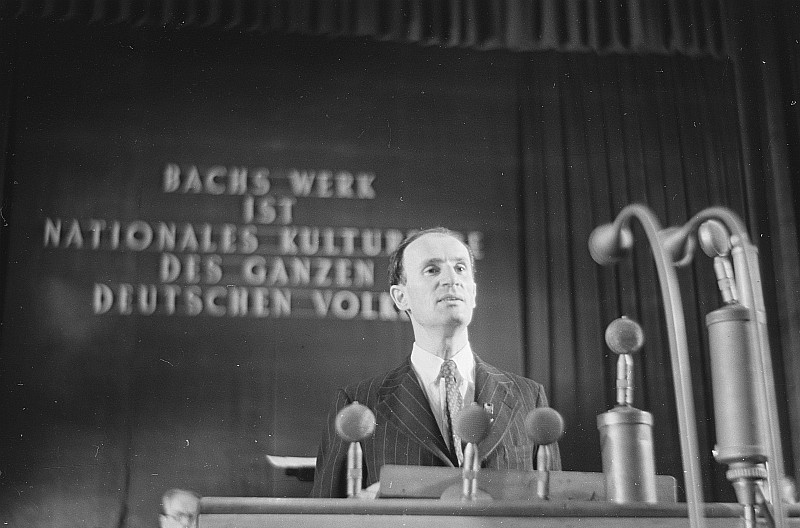
Ernst Hermann Meyer's approval of On Guard for Peace led to Prokofiev becoming an important influence on East German composers in the 1950s

=== Influence in the Eastern Bloc ===
In his book on socialist realism, Musik im Zeitgeschehen, Ernst Hermann Meyer cited On Guard for Peace as a key example of how the 1948 Anti-Formalist Resolution on Music had a beneficial effect on Prokofiev. In the February 1953 issue of Musik und Gesellschaft, Meyer reiterated his beliefs jointly with Paul Dessau. His approval helped to establish Prokofiev as one of the most important influences on new music in East Germany during the 1950s.

Elsewhere in the Eastern Bloc, On Guard for Peace was among the works that defined officially accepted socialist realist musical composition. It directly influenced composers in East Germany and Poland; including Stanisław Skrowaczewski, Tadeusz Baird, Hanns Eisler, Meyer, and Dessau. It also influenced an early work by Alfred Schnittke, his oratorio Nagasaki.

=== 21st century appraisals ===
The collaborative creation of On Guard for Peace has drawn criticism from later writers on music. Simon Morrison echoed Schwarz's criticisms, adding that he felt Mira Mendelson had missed the "obvious point" that the score's "paleness is the direct result of bureaucratic compromise".

Tom Service, reviewing for The Guardian a live 2003 performance of On Guard for Peace conducted by Vladimir Ashkenazy, wrote that it was "Communist bravado on [a grand] scale" singled out the "Lullaby" movement as a "moment that encapsulates the contradictions of Prokofiev's music, as this simple and beautiful melody pays homage to Stalin's murderous regime".

== Cited sources ==
- Frolova-Walker, Marina (2016). Stalin's Music Prize: Soviet Culture and Politics. Yale University Press. ISBN 9780300208849.
- Kravetz, Nelly (2012). Рядом с великими: Атовмьян и его время (in Russian). Москва: ГИТИС. ISBN 978-5-91328-104-3.
- McAllister, Rita; Guillaumier, Christina, eds. (2020). Rethinking Prokofiev. Oxford University Press. ISBN 978-0-19-067077-1.
- Mendelson-Prokofieva, Mira (2012). О Сергее Сергеевиче Прокофьеве. Воспоминания. Дневники (1938–1967) (in Russian). Москва: Композитор. ISBN 978-5-4254-0046-8.
- Mendelson-Prokofieva, Mira. "Как создавалась оратория 'На страже мира'". Недописанная страница: Самуил Маршак (in Russian). Archived from the original on October 4, 2022.
- Morrison, Simon (2009). The People's Artist: Prokofiev's Soviet Years. Oxford University Press. ISBN 978-0-19-518167-8.
- Nestyev, Israel (1960). Prokofiev. Translated by Jonas, Florence. Stanford University Press.
- Nice, David (November 2021). "Prokofieff: Work List" (PDF). Boosey & Hawkes. Archived from the original on April 24, 2023.
- Schlifstein, Semyon, ed. (1957). Sergei Prokofiev: Autobiography, Articles, Reminiscences. Moscow: Foreign Languages Publishing House.
