= Boris Pokrovsky =

Russian opera director

- Born: Boris Aleksandrovich Pokrovsky; 23 January 1912; Moscow, Russian Empire
- Died: 5 June 2009 (aged 97); Moscow, Russia
- Occupations: Theater director, opera director, theater pedagogue

Boris Aleksandrovich Pokrovsky (Russian: Борис Александрович Покровский; 23 January 1912 – 5 June 2009) was a Soviet and Russian opera director and pedagogue, best known as the stage director of the Bolshoi Theatre between 1943 and 1982.

== Early life and career ==
Pokrovsky was born in Moscow, Russian Empire in 1912.

His first production was a staging of Georges Bizet's Carmen in Nizhny Novgorod. He served as the artistic director of the Bolshoi in 1952-1963 and 1973-1982 and was named a People's Artist of the USSR in 1961. His production of Vano Muradeli's opera The Great Friendship was the target of the second Zhdanov Ukase (1948), and it was he who first staged Sergei Prokofiev's War and Peace, in 1946. He took this opera to Italy for its first full staging there, in 1964.

In 1965 in Moscow he directed the first Russian-language production of Benjamin Britten's A Midsummer Night's Dream.

In 1972 Pokrovsky founded the Moscow Chamber Opera Theater with Gennady Rozhdestvensky, and he produced operas such as Igor Stravinsky's The Rake's Progress, Alfred Schnittke's Life with an Idiot, and in 1974 the first Soviet production of Dmitri Shostakovich's The Nose since 1929.

In 1975 he took the Bolshoi Theatre on its first American tour.

== Awards and honors ==
- Order of the Badge of Honour
- Three Stalin Prizes first degree (1947, 1948, 1950)
- Stalin Prize second degree (1949)
- People's Artist of the RSFSR (1957)
- People's Artist of the USSR (1961)
- Two Orders of Lenin (1967, 1976)
- Two Orders of the Red Banner of Labour (1972, 1982)
- Lenin Prize (1980)
- Two State Prizes of the Russian Federation (1995, 2004)
- Two Golden Masks (1996, 2004)
- Order "For Merit to the Fatherland", 3rd class (1997)
- Medal of Pushkin (1999)
- Order "For Merit to the Fatherland", 2nd class (2002)
- Order of the Cross of Terra Mariana, 3rd class (2004)
- Order "For Merit to the Fatherland", 1st class (2007)

== Family ==
He was the father of actress Alla Pokrovskaya, father-in-law of Mariya Lemesheva, and the grandfather of actor Mikhail Yefremov. His second wife was the soprano Irina Maslennikova.

== Death ==
Boris Pokrovsky died in Moscow in 2009.
