= Yevgeny Gorbenko =

- Born: 1910
- Origin: Russia
- Died: 1979 (aged 68–69)
- Occupation(s): Choirmaster, Music teacher

Yevgeny Pavlovich Gorbenko (Russian: Евгений Павлович Горбенко; 1910–1979) was a Soviet choirmaster, music teacher, the first chief choirmaster of the Novosibirsk Opera and Ballet Theatre, Honored Artist of the RSFSR (1955).

== Biography ==
Yevgeny Gorbenko was born on February 12, 1910, in Saint Petersburg

In 1928, he graduated from the Leningrad State Academic Capella.

In 1936, the musician moved to Novosibirsk. From 1936 to 1941, he worked as a choirmaster and pianist-accompanist at the Novosibirsk Radio Committee.

From June 6, 1944, to 1963 and from 1969 to 1978, Gorbenko was the chief choirmaster of the Novosibirsk Opera and Ballet Theatre. In 1963–1969, he worked as a choirmaster of this theatre.

In Novosibirsk, as a choirmaster producer, he realized more than 50 opera performances: Ivan Susanin (M. Glinka), Carmen (G. Bizet), Zaporozhets za Dunayem (I. Dzerzhinsky), Faust (Ch. Gounod), The Queen of Spades (P. Tchaikovsky), Sevastopoltsy (M. Koval, the work was first staged in 1947), Eugene Onegin (P. Tchaikovsky), Aida (G. Verdi), The Great Friendship (V. Muradeli) etc.

He died on May 9, 1979, in Novosibirsk.

== Family ==
- daughter – Tatiana Gorbenko (born 1941) is the chief choirmaster of the Novosibirsk Musical Theatre, Honored Artists of the Russian Federation (1995).
