= Gamrekeli (surname) =

Gamrekeli (Georgian: გამრეკელი) is a Georgian surname. Notable people with the surname include:

- Gamrekeli, also known as Toreli, a medieval Georgian noble family
- David Gamrekeli (1911–1977), Georgian baritone opera singer
- Irakli Gamrekeli (1894–1943), Georgian set designer
