= Zara Dolukhanova =

Soviet and Russian singer (1918–2007)

- Зара Долуханова
- Born: 15 March 1918; Moscow, Soviet Union
- Died: 4 December 2007 (aged 89); Moscow, Russia
- Awards: Order "For Merit to the Fatherland"; Lenin Prize; Stalin Prize

Zara Aleksandrovna Dolukhanova (Armenian: Զարուհի Դոլուխանյան, Russian: Зара Александровна Долуханова; 15 March 1918 – 4 December 2007) was a Soviet Armenian mezzo-soprano who achieved fame performing on many lauded radio broadcasts of operas and works from the concert repertoire during the 1940s through the 1960s. Although considered one of Soviet-era Russia's most accomplished opera singers, Dolukhanova made only a relatively small number of appearances on the actual opera stage and her fame rests primarily in her extensive work for radio and performances on the concert stage.

Dolukhanova's voice was a rare coloratura-mezzo, of unique clarity and unusually wide range. Considered one of the great singers of the Soviet era, Dolukhanova was notable for her championing of the operas of Gioachino Rossini, drawing particular acclaim for her Isabella in L'italiana in Algeri and Angelina in La Cenerentola. She also performed a wide range of works from concert repertoire that encompassed most of the great Russian composers as well as numerous works by Handel, Haydn, Mozart and Meyerbeer. In 1966, she was awarded the Lenin Prize.

== Life ==
Dolukhanova was born Zara Makaryan, in Moscow, to parents of Armenian and Kurdish descent. Her mother, Elena Makaryan, was also a professional singer, and her father, Aghasi Makaryan, was a professional flautist, clarinettist and trumpeter. She first studied the piano, then the violin, but finally decided at age 16 that she wanted to study singing. She studied at the Gnessin Institute in Moscow with V. Belyayeva-Tarassevitch. She made her operatic debut in 1938 at the Yerevan Opera Theatre as Siebel in Gounod's Faust. She remained a member of that company for the next three years, singing mainly minor roles.

Shortly after leaving the Yerevan Opera Theatre, Dolukhanova married the composer Alexander Dolukhanian, and from this point on used her married name when she performed. She continued to perform with minor opera houses in Armenia until she and her husband relocated to Moscow in 1944, when she was appointed as a soloist with the USSR All-Union Radio Symphony Orchestra. She sang often with the orchestra over the next two decades, including in the world premiere of Sergei Prokofiev's On Guard for Peace. In 1959, she became a leading soloist with the Moscow Philharmonic Orchestra, performing with the orchestra frequently during the 1960s. After 1963, she began to take on soprano roles, including the title roles in Norma, Aida, and Tosca. She notably performed in the Russian premieres of Suor Angelica and Strauss's Four Last Songs, as well as the 1955 world premiere of Shostakovich's song cycle From Jewish Folk Poetry.

Outside of Russia, Dolukhanova maintained an unusually active concert and recital schedule for a Soviet-era artist. She made her United States debut at Carnegie Hall in New York City in 1959 and also toured the United Kingdom, Scandinavia, Japan, New Zealand, and Latin America during her career with Pianist Nina Svetlanova.

In 1970, Dolukhanova retired from singing and joined the voice faculty at the Gnessin Institute, where she taught for more than twenty-five years. Among her pupils was the mezzo-soprano Olga Borodina.

She died aged 90 on December 4, 2007 in Moscow. She was buried in the Moscow Armenian Cemetery.

== Recordings ==
- Rossini: L'italiana in Algeri: Zara Dolukhanova, A. Nikitin, Vladimir Zakharov, Georgi Abramov, Anatoly Tikhonov, Moscow Philharmonic Orchestra, Moscow Radio Chorus, conductor: Samuil Samosud. Gala Records, 1951.
- Rossini: Zolushka – La cenerentola: Zara Dolukhanova, Anatoly Orfenov, Vladimir Zakharov, Genady Troitsky, Moscow Radio Orchestra, Moscow Radio Chorus, conductor: Onissim Bron. 1950.

== Honours and awards ==
- Order of Merit for the Fatherland 4th class (14 March 2003)
- Medal "For the Development of Virgin Lands"
- Jubilee Medal "In Commemoration of the 100th Anniversary since the Birth of Vladimir Il'ich Lenin"
- Medal "Veteran of Labour" (1984)
- Jubilee Medal "50 Years of Victory in the Great Patriotic War 1941-1945"
- Medal "In Commemoration of the 850th Anniversary of Moscow"
- Lenin Prize (1966)
- People's Artist of the RSFSR (1956)
- State Prize of the USSR
- People's Artist of the USSR (1990)
- Miner's Glory Medal
