= David Gamrekeli =

Georgian opera singer (1911–1977)

- დავით გამრეკელი
- Born: July 27, 1911; Chiatura, Kutaisi Governorate, Russian Empire
- Died: November 29, 1977 (aged 66); Tbilisi, Georgian SSR, Soviet Union
- Education: Tbilisi State Conservatory (1935)
- Occupation: Opera singer

David Aleksandrovich Gamrekeli (Georgian: დავით ალექსანდრეს ძე გამრეკელი, 27 July 1911 – 29 November 1977) was a Georgian baritone opera singer. He was awarded the title People's Artist of the Georgian SSR in 1943 and the Stalin Prize in 1950.

== Biography ==
Gamrekeli was born in Chiatura. In 1935, he graduated from the Tbilisi State Conservatory, studying under Professor Vronsky. That year, the young baritone sang at the Tbilisi Opera and Ballet Theatre the role of Prince Yeletsky from Tchaikovsky's opera The Queen of Spades. In 1937 in Moscow, Georgian Literature and the Arts of the decade, he performed Kiazo's role in Paliashvili's opera Daisi (Sunset). One year later he became laureate of the First All-Union Competition of Vocalists.

He sang the leading roles from Georgian and foreign operas at the Tbilisi Opera and Ballet Theatre. He performed as a soloist at the Bolshoi Theatre from 1944 to 1952. In 1947 he took the role of the Commissar (Sergo Ordzhonikidze) in Vano Muradeli's ill-fated opera, The Great Friendship.

Gamrekeli's opera repertoire included thirty opera roles, including Tchaikovsky's Eugene Onegin, Verdi's Rigoletto, the roles of Renato and Germont, Escamillo from Bizet's Carmen and others.

He died in Tbilisi in 1977, aged 66.

== Awards and honours ==
- People's Artist of the Georgian SSR (1943)
- Honoured Worker of the Arts Industry of the RSFSR (1951)
- Stalin Prize, 1st class (1950)
- Two Orders of the Red Banner of Labour (24 February 1946 and 27 May 1951)
- Two Orders of the Badge of Honour (14 January 1937 and 25 May 1976)
