= From Jewish Folk Poetry =

1948 song cycle by Dmitri Shostakovich

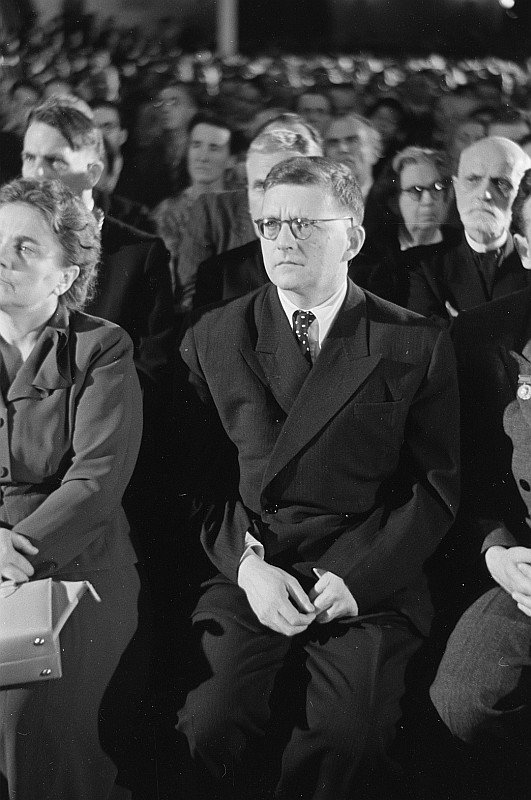
Composer Dmitri Shostakovich in 1950

From Jewish Folk Poetry, Op. 79, is a song cycle for soprano, contralto, tenor and piano (or orchestra) by Dmitri Shostakovich. It uses texts taken from the collection Jewish folk songs, compiled by I. Dobrushin and A. Yuditsky, edited by Y. M. Sokolov (Goslitizdat, 1947).

The cycle is just one of many works by Shostakovich to incorporate elements of Jewish music; he said that he was attracted by "a jolly melody on sad intonations". The first eight songs of the piano version was composed in August 1948, after Shostakovich's denunciation in the Zhdanov decree of that year. Three more songs, which explore the great life Jews enjoyed under the Soviet regime, were added in October 1948 in order to allow the cycle to pass the censors. Shostakovich also wrote an orchestra version for the cycle, and completed the first 8 songs by October 1948.

The composer's situation made a public premiere impossible until January 15, 1955, when it was performed by Shostakovich himself on piano with Nina Dorliak (soprano), Zara Dolukhanova (mezzo-soprano) and Aleksei Maslennikov (tenor). Before the premiere the work received a number of private performances. Premiere of the orchestra version was on February 19, 1964, Gennady Rozhdestvensky conducted Gorky Philharmonic Orchestra with Galina Pisarenko (soprano), Larisa Avdeyeva (mezzo-soprano) and Aleksei Maslennikov (tenor) as the soloists.

== Structure ==
The cycle consists of 11 songs:

1. The Lament for the Dead Child. Russian translation by T. Spendiarova (1 August 1948)
2. The Thoughtful Mother and Aunt. Russian translation by A. Globa (5 August 1948)
3. Lullaby. Russian translation by V. Zvyagintseva (10 August 1948)
4. Before a Long Parting. Russian translation by A. Globa (15 August 1948)
5. A Warning. Russian translation by N. Ushakov (20 August 1948)
6. The Abandoned Father. Russian translation by S. Mar (25 August 1948)
7. The Song of Misery. Text by B. Shafir. Russian translation by B. Semyonov (29 August 1948)
8. Winter. Russian translation by B. Semyonov (29 August 1948)
9. A Good Life. Russian translation by S. Olender (10 October 1948)
10. The Young Girl's Song. Russian translation by S. Olender (16 October 1948)
11. Happiness. Russian translation by L. Dligach (24 October 1948)

== References and sources ==
- Wilson, Elizabeth (2006). Shostakovich: A Life Remembered. London: Faber. ISBN 0-571-22050-9.
