= Tatiana Gorbenko =

Tatiana Yevgenievna Gorbenko (Russian: Татьяна Евгеньевна Горбенко; born 4 April 1941) is a Soviet and Russian theater figure, the chief choirmaster of the Novosibirsk Musical Theatre, pedagogue, Honored Artist of the Russian Federation (1995).

== Biography ==
She was born on April 4, 1941, in Novosibirsk. Her father Yevgeny Gorbenko was the first chief choirmaster of the Novosibirsk Opera and Ballet Theatre, her mother worked at the Novosibirsk House of Models and Tatiana Gorbenko's grandmother was Polish who, according to her recollections, sang and played the piano well.

She graduated from the music school with a red diploma and the Faculty of Choral Conducting of the Novosibirsk Conservatory. In 1975, she began her career at the Novosibirsk Theatre of Musical Comedy.

For 15 years, she has been teaching choir disciplines and headed the musical and cultural educational schools.

In the operetta theatre, her first work as a choirmaster-director was the Vasily Tyorkin (1975) by A. Novikov.

Together with the Honored Art Worker Eleonora Titkova, she staged such works as Maritza, Mister Iks, Passion of Saint Michael, Irresistible Saprykin, Krechinsky's Wedding and others.
