= Symphony No. 7 (Prokofiev) =

1952 symphony by Sergei Prokofiev

- by Sergei Prokofiev
- Key: C♯ minor
- Opus: 131
- Composed: 1952
- Duration: 31–35 min
- Movements: Four

Premiere
- Date: October 11, 1952
- Location: Trade Union Hall of Columns, Moscow
- Conductor: Samuil Samosud
- Performers: All-Union Radio Orchestra

Sergei Prokofiev's Symphony No. 7 in C♯ minor, Op. 131, was completed in 1952, the year before his death. It is his last symphony.

== Background ==
Most of the symphony is emotionally restrained, nostalgic and melancholy in mood, including the ending of the Vivace final movement. However, Prokofiev was later convinced to add an energetic and optimistic coda, so as to win the Stalin Prize of 5,000 rubles. Before he died, Prokofiev indicated that the original quiet ending was to be preferred.

The premiere was well-received, and in 1957, four years after Prokofiev's death, the symphony was awarded the Lenin Prize.

== Movements ==
The symphony is in four movements, lasting 30–35 minutes:

1. Moderato
2. Allegretto
3. Andante espressivo
4. Vivace

The first movement, in sonata form, opens with a melancholic first theme on violins, which contrasts with the warm and lyrical second theme on winds. After a brief development section, the recapitulation of the two themes follows, and the movement ends in a reflective mood with the clock-ticking sounds on glockenspiel and xylophone.

The second movement is an autumnal waltz, reminiscent of Prokofiev's ballet Cinderella, while the third movement is an expressive and singing slow movement.

The finale, in D♭ major (C♯ major enharmonic), contains an innocent cheerfulness. There is a slowing of pace and the return of the warm wind theme from the first movement, and the symphony ends with the same tinkling sounds from the tuned percussion as the first movement.

== Instrumentation ==
The work scores for the following:

Woodwinds

piccolo
2 flutes
2 oboes
cor anglais
2 clarinets
bass clarinet
2 bassoons

Brass

4 horn
3 trumpets
3 trombones
tuba

Percussion

timpani
bass drum
snare drum
cymbals
tambourine
triangle
wood blocks
xylophone
glockenspiel

Keyboards

piano

Strings

harp

violins (1st and 2nd)
violas
cellos
double basses

== Recordings ==
Samuil Samosud conducted the premiere performance (Trade Union Hall of Columns, Moscow, All-Union Radio Orchestra, 11 October 1952); he recorded it with the same orchestra, using the original slow ending, in 1953 (reissued in 1957 as "Moscow Radio-TV Orchestra".) The first recording with the new ending was by Eugene Ormandy and the Philadelphia Orchestra, from sessions on 26 April 1953. Nikolai Malko and the Philharmonia Orchestra were the first to record the music in stereo, in 1955.

== Bibliography ==
- Berger, Liubov’ Grigor’evna. Sed’maia simfoniia S. Prokof’eva, poiasnenie. Moscow: Sovetskii Kompozitor, 1961.
- Jaffé, Daniel. Sergey Prokofiev. 20th-Century Composers. London; New York: Phaidon Press, 1998. ISBN 0714835137 (cloth); ISBN 0714847747 (pbk.).
- Slonimskii, Sergei Mikhailovich. Simfonii Prokof’eva: opyt issledovaniia. Leningrad: Muzyka [Leningradskoe otd-nie], 1964.
- Clark, Colin. Review of Prokofiev Symphony Recordings (Gergiev, etc.) MusicWeb, http://www.musicweb-international.com/SandH/2004/May-Aug04/Prokofiev_CC.htm
- Ottaway, Hugh. "Prokofiev's Seventh Symphony." The Musical Times, vol. 96, no. 1344 (February 1955), pp. 74–75.
- Prokofiev, Sergei. Symphony No. 7, Philadelphia Orchestra, Eugene Ormandy, 1953 (discography of symphony recordings) http://www.reocities.com/Tokyo/1471/symphony.html
- Prokofiev, Sergei. Symphony No. 7, All-Union Orchestra ("Moscow Radio-TV Orchestra" in reissue of 1957), Samuil Samosud, cond. https://web.archive.org/web/20030308094425/http://www.prokofiev.org/recordings/album.cfm?aid=000727
