= Piano Sonata No. 8 (Prokofiev) =

1944 piano sonata by Sergei Prokofiev

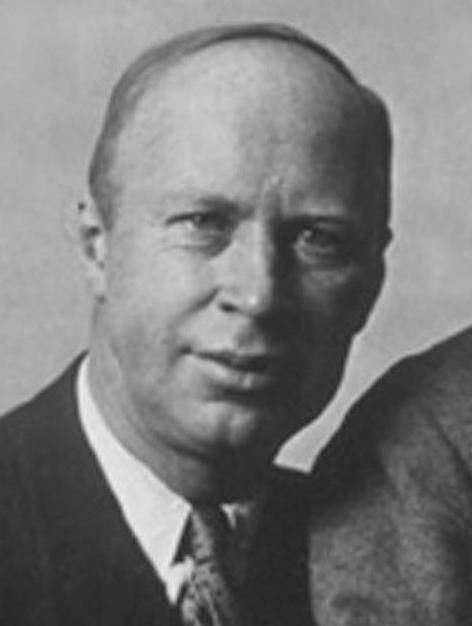
Sergei Prokofiev in 1936

Sergei Prokofiev's Piano Sonata No. 8 in B♭ major, Op. 84 is a sonata for solo piano, the third and longest of the three "war sonatas", with performances typically lasting around 30 minutes. He completed it in 1944 and dedicated it to his partner Mira Mendelson, who later became his second wife. The sonata was first performed on 30 December 1944, in Moscow, by Emil Gilels.

== Movements ==
The sonata has three movements.

1. Andante dolce – Allegro moderato (in B♭ major)
2. Andante sognando (in D♭ major)
3. Vivace (in B♭ major)

=== I. Andante dolce – Allegro moderato ===
The movement begins with a lyrical theme. The key is B♭ major, but the sense of tonality is weak due to Prokofiev's frequent modulations to remote keys. Next is a theme in G minor that goes through a series of modulations which prepares the development section. The development section is tonally unstable and propelled by motoric rhythms. Another theme emerges, leading into a reprise of the first theme, followed by a truncated reprise of the development section, this time in B♭ minor. The movement ends in B♭ major.

=== II. Andante sognando ===
In this brief movement, Prokofiev uses a theme from his then unperformed melodramatic adaptation of Eugene Onegin.

=== III. Vivace ===
The movement begins with a driving theme in several arpeggios, introducing one of the main themes, in B♭ major. Tonality is weak, as the very next theme is in A minor. After a brief return to B♭ major, it then introduces another theme in the key of B major. Then another theme enters, this one in C major. After the initial section, the piece enters into a waltz-like portion that is in D♭ major. The movement segues into a much quieter section, alternating in D♭ major and C♯ minor. Throughout this section, the left hand includes references to the waltz-like section. Then after this section, the A minor theme returns, building into the return of the opening theme. The final section combines nearly all of the elements that have come before. Tonality is still weak. The C major theme enters, transposed to B♭ major. Then the A minor theme returns, also transposed to B♭ major. There is a new theme, building up to a coda in B♭ major.
