= Mira Mendelson =

Soviet writer (1915–1968)

- Мира Мендельсон
- Born: Mariya-Cecilia Abramovna Mendelson; January 8, 1915; Kiev, Russian Empire
- Died: June 8, 1968 (aged 53); Moscow, Russian SFSR, Soviet Union
- Resting place: Novodevichy Cemetery
- Occupations: Poet; writer; translator
- Spouse: Sergei Prokofiev (m. 1948; died 1953)

Mariya-Cecilia Abramovna Mendelson-Prokofieva (Russian: Мария-Цецилия Абрамовна Мендельсон-Прокофьева; January 8, 1915 [O.S. December 26, 1914] – June 8, 1968), better known as Mira Mendelson (Russian: Мира Александровна Мендельсон), was a Russian poet, writer, and translator who was the second wife of the composer Sergei Prokofiev. She was the co-librettist of her husband's operas Betrothal in a Monastery, The Story of a Real Man, and War and Peace, as well as the ballet The Tale of the Stone Flower.

== Early life and education ==
Mendelson was born in Kiev on January 8, 1915; the only child of Abram Solomonovich (1885–1968) and Vera Natanovna Mendelson (1886–1951). Her father was an economist and statistician, while her mother had earned recognition for her work as a member of the Communist Party of the Soviet Union. As a young woman she began her studies in higher education at the Energy Sector of the Genplan Institute of Moscow, before transferring to the Maxim Gorky Literature Institute to major in poetry and English translation.

== Meeting Sergei Prokofiev ==
The details of how she first met Prokofiev, or how her professional relationship with the then married composer developed into an extramarital affair remain unclear. According to Mendelson's memoirs, she met her future husband in August 1938 at a resort in Kislovodsk, where they were vacationing with their respective families. She remembered that the son of Alexander Fersman drew her attention to Prokofiev's presence at the resort. Shortly thereafter she saw the composer for the first time:

At lunchtime a diminutive woman entered the dining room of the sanatorium, followed by a tall man with an extraordinary stride and a very serious expression on his face. Maybe this is what they mean by 'love at first sight.'

In a letter written to Prokofiev less than a year before their final separation, his then wife Lina decried what she perceived as Mendelson's calculated pursuit of him:

Remember what you wrote after the first meeting. It was hardly you who chose [Mendelson and her family], but they who "chose" you—where? At a health resort—you, not some speck of sand, but [Sergei Sergeyevich Prokofiev], the leading composer of the nation, a famous person with a family man aura, twice as old. Perhaps you will say "love at first sight"—who will believe that? There were sufficient witnesses in Kislovodsk to the fact that she followed you everywhere.

After their first conversation on August 26, Mendelson and Prokofiev began taking walks together wherein they discussed music and literature. Mendelson later wrote that she had been fascinated by Prokofiev's "foreign" elegance and charm. The composer maintained feeling a sense of déjà vu upon meeting her, citing her resemblance to his previous infatuations, Nina Meshcherskaya and Ida Rubinstein. At the end of their vacation they promised each other to meet again in Kislovodsk the following year and to remain in contact in the meantime. In January 1939 he gifted to her a signed photograph of himself, which bore the inscription: "To a blossoming poet, from a modest admirer." For his birthday in April of that same year, Mendelson wrote a poem for him where she declared that "your necklace of kisses, tender words is a gift/brighter than all the diamonds in the world."

Early on their relationship had raised the suspicions of Prokofiev's first wife. She stated in interviews after her former husband's death that he had initially described Mendelson as "just some girl who wants me to read her bad poetry." Later he defended his meetings with her on professional grounds, telling his wife that Mendelson was helping him to find suitable libretti for his projected operas. By 1939, the relationship between composer and budding poet became a source of gossip in the Soviet musical world. Lina's suspicions were confirmed in a message to her from an acquaintance, but felt powerless to impede her husband from continuing his affair. When he finally disclosed the affair to his wife, she replied that she would not object to it so long as he did not go to live with Mendelson.

== Beginnings of romantic and professional relationship with Prokofiev ==
Prokofiev began to appear in public with Mendelson in the fall of that same year, including at the premiere of Semyon Kotko, an event at which his wife was also in attendance, leading to an uncomfortable scene between the three. During this period, Prokofiev and Mendelson began their first collaboration, the opera Betrothal in a Monastery. Based on Richard Brinsley Sheridan's libretto to The Duenna, Mendelson translated the work from English into Russian. Prokofiev also began sketching out the Piano Sonata No. 8, a work whose first movement "Andante dolce" theme he told Mendelson was inspired by her. He dedicated the score to her upon its completion in 1944.

On March 15, 1941, Prokofiev declared to his wife that their marriage was over. He moved into Mendelson's apartment in central Moscow a few days later. Despite the acrimonious separation, Prokofiev continued to financially support his estranged wife and family, sometimes employing his friend and colleague Levon Atovmyan as an intermediary.

The German invasion of the Soviet Union forced Mendelson and Prokofiev to flee Moscow, first to the Georgian SSR, then to the Kazakh SSR. During this period, they collaborated on a number of operatic projects, many of which were abandoned, including a proposed setting of Tolstoy's Resurrection. Out of that came the couple's most important artistic collaboration, the opera War and Peace, a subject Mendelson's father suggested was better suited for the composer.

== Marriage, widowhood, and legal battles ==
After the end of World War II, the couple returned to Moscow, and spent the rest of their summers together at their dacha in Nikolina Gora. While there the couple enjoyed gardening and venturing into the surrounding forests to forage for mushrooms, sometimes joined by his friend Nikolai Myaskovsky. On November 22, 1947, Prokofiev filed a petition in court to begin divorce proceedings against his estranged wife, Lina. Five days later the court rejected his petition, ruling that the marriage had no legal basis since it had taken place in Germany, and had not been registered with Soviet officials, thus making it null and void. After a second judge upheld the verdict, he and Mendelson wed on January 15, 1948. On February 20, 1948, Prokofiev's ex-wife was arrested in Moscow and subsequently sentenced to 20 years in the Gulag for "attempting to defect" and maintaining "criminal ties" with foreign embassies.

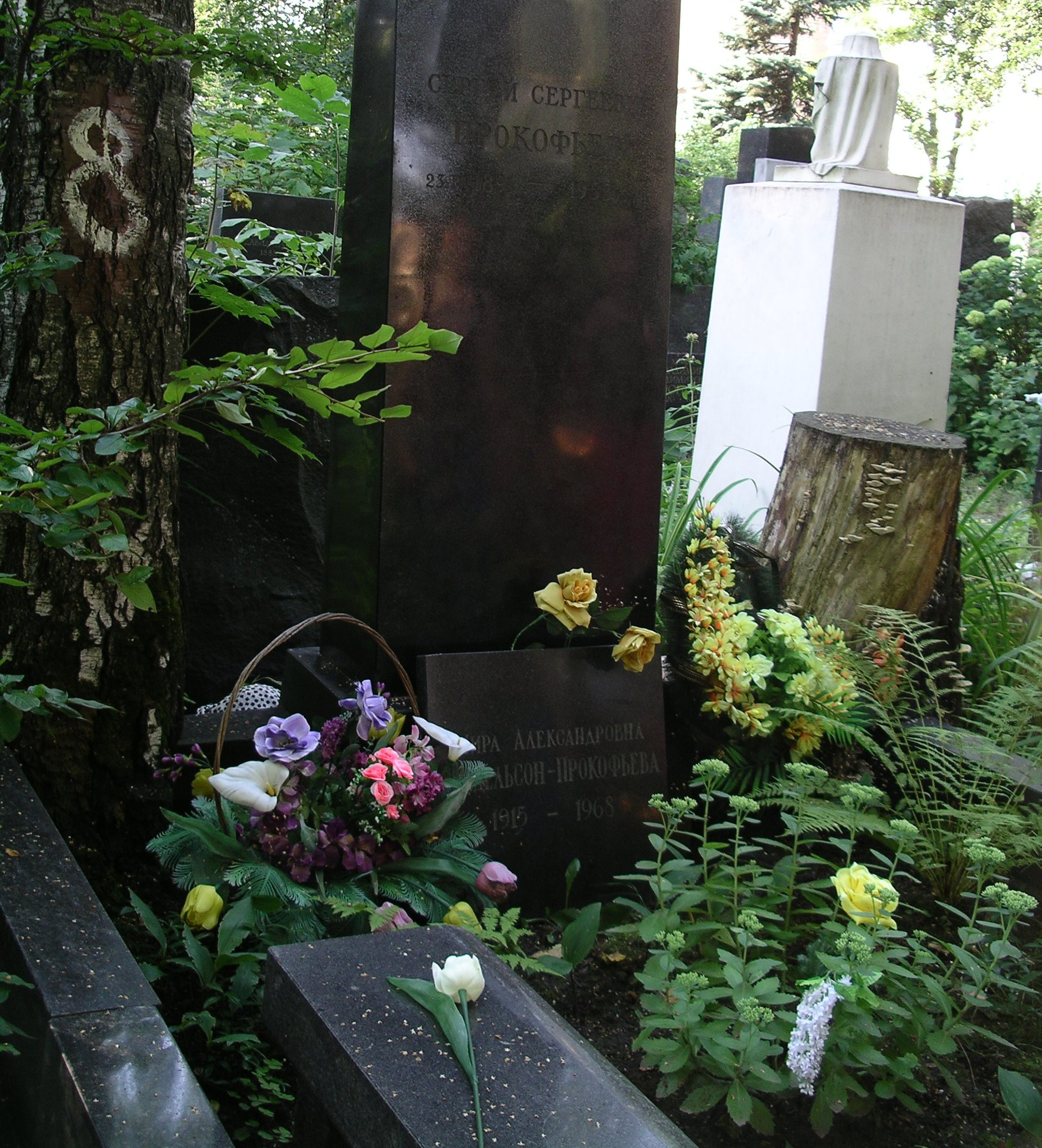
Mira Mendelson's grave next to Sergei Prokofiev's at the Novodevichy Cemetery

Prokofiev's final years were beset by health problems brought upon by hypertension, which necessitated Mendelson's additional assistance as secretary and sometimes caregiver. Despite his increasing physical ailments, Mendelson worked to aid him as much as possible in order for him to retain his customary working schedule, as well as maintain his interests in new music and art. He died from a cerebral hemorrhage on March 5, 1953. "It was good that we were together", he told Mendelson before his death.

In the weeks after her husband's death, she helped to organize a memorial concert at the Union of Soviet Composers to commemorate what would have been his 62nd birthday. Performances by Sviatoslav Richter, Nina Dorliak, and Mstislav Rostropovich were preceded by tributes from Dmitry Kabalevsky and Reinhold Glière. She also supervised the rehearsals for the posthumous premiere of his final ballet, The Tale of the Stone Flower, but was dismayed by the cuts demanded by conductor Yuri Fayer, as well as by his insistence on commissioning Boris Pogrebov to reorchestrate the score.

In 1956, upon her release from the Gulag, Prokofiev's first wife Lina petitioned the courts to reassert her rights as her ex-husband's sole and legitimate spouse. An initial ruling in her favor was reversed on March 12, 1958, by the Supreme Court of the Soviet Union, which reaffirmed that her marriage had no legal validity. Dmitry Kabalevsky, Dmitri Shostakovich, and Tikhon Khrennikov were among the witnesses called upon by the court to give their testimonies. The legal process, statements by Lina which Mendelson considered to be smears against Prokofiev, and the aid his ex-wife received in her petition by her personal friend Khrennikov, whom Mendelson regarded a tormentor to her husband, left her feeling despondent.

== Final years and death ==
Mendelson spent her own final years living in the same Moscow apartment she had shared with her husband, although she privately commented on how her neighbors distressed her and how difficult life without Prokofiev was. She occupied her time organizing her husband's papers, promoting his music, and writing her memoirs. The idea for her memoirs was kindled by Prokofiev, who had insisted to her that she write them. Nevertheless, work on the memoirs was difficult for her; they ultimately remained incomplete. After the death of her father earlier in the year, Mendelson died of a heart attack in Moscow on June 8, 1968. Inside her purse was found a message dated February 1950, signed by both her and her husband: "We wish to be buried next to each other." Their wishes were honored and their remains are buried together at Novodevichy Cemetery.

== Legacy ==
Mendelson's diary was published in 2004. It was reissued and expanded with the inclusion of the entirety of her surviving writings about her husband in 2012. Two years before her death, she bequeathed various personal belongings to the Sergei Prokofiev Museum in Moscow.
