= Samuil Samosud =

Soviet conductor (1884–1964)

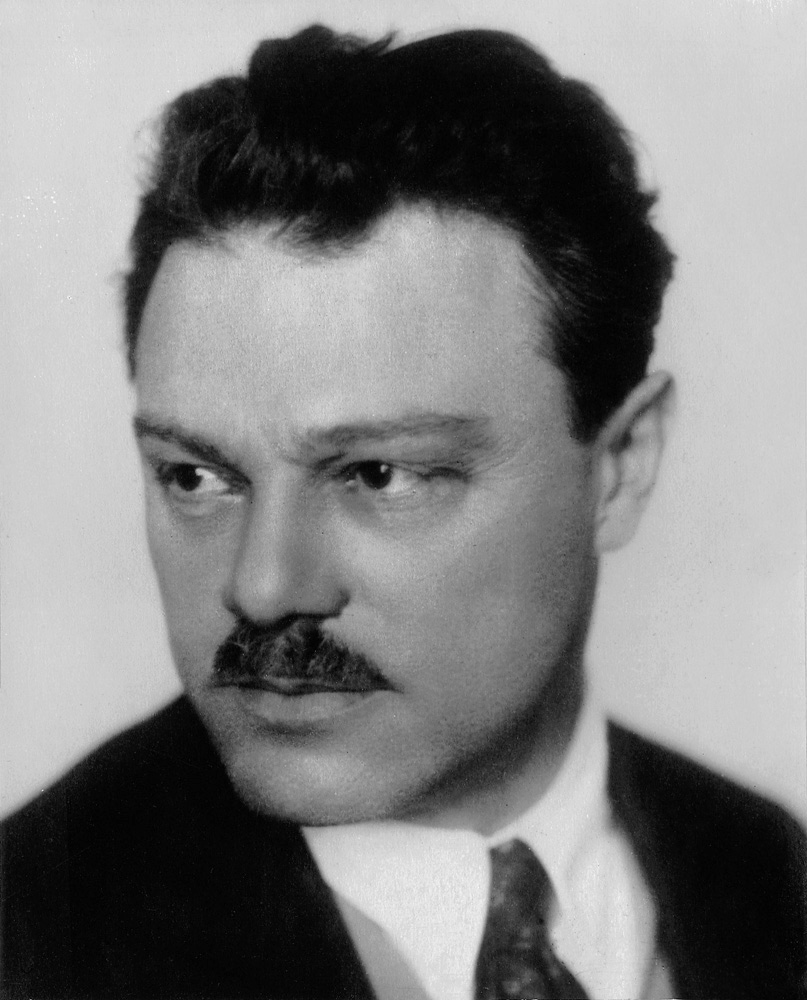
Samuil Samosud in the 1930s

Samuil Abramovich Samosud (Russian: Самуи́л Абра́мович Самосу́д; 14 May [O.S. 2 May] 1884, Tiflis — 6 November 1964, Moscow) was a Soviet and Russian Jewish conductor and pedagogue.

He started his musical career as a cellist, before becoming a conductor at the Mariinsky Theatre, Petrograd in 1917. From 1918 to 1936 he conducted at the Maly Operny, Leningrad. In 1936 he became musical director at the Bolshoi Theatre, Moscow. He founded what became the Moscow Philharmonic Orchestra in 1951. He premiered several important works, including Shostakovich's Lady Macbeth of Mtsensk, The Nose and the Seventh Symphony; as well as Prokofiev's War and Peace and On Guard for Peace. Shostakovich "had a high opinion" of Samosud's theatrical performances, and regarded him as "the supreme interpreter" of operatic works including Lady Macbeth. Nonetheless, after hearing Samosud conduct the Seventh Symphony, the composer wrote that he wanted to hear Yevgeny Mravinsky perform the symphony, as he didn't "have great faith in Samosud as a symphonic conductor".

== Awards and honors ==
- Honored Artist of the RSFSR
- People's Artist of the RSFSR (1936)
- Order of the Badge of Honour (1936)
- People's Artist of the USSR (1937)
- Order of Lenin (1937)
- Stalin Prize first degree (1947)
- Two Stalin Prizes first degree (1941, 1952)
- Order of the Red Banner of Labour (1964)
- Medal "For Valiant Labour in the Great Patriotic War 1941–1945"
- Medal "In Commemoration of the 800th Anniversary of Moscow"

Cultural offices
Preceded by unknown	Music Directors, Bolshoi Theatre, Moscow; 1936–1942	Succeeded by Ari Pazovsky
Preceded by none	Music Directors, Moscow Philharmonic Orchestra; 1951–1957	Succeeded by Kiril Kondrashin
Preceded by none	Principal Conductors, USSR Ministry of Culture Symphony Orchestra; 1957–1964	Succeeded by Yuri Ahronovich
