= Marina Frolova-Walker =

Russian-born British musicologist (born 1966)

Prof. Marina Frolova-Walker
- Education: Moscow Conservatoire College
- Occupation: Professor Researcher Lecturer Broadcaster
- Employer(s): University of Cambridge, Clare College, Gresham College
- Notable work: Stalin's Music Prize: Soviet Culture and Politics (Yale, 2016)
- Spouse: Jonathan Walker
- Website: https://www.marinafrolova-walker.com/

Marina Frolova-Walker FBA (Russian: Марина Фролова-Уокер; born 1966) is a Russian-born British musicologist and music historian, who specialises in German Romanticism, Russian and Soviet music, and nationalism in music. She is Professor of Music History at the University of Cambridge and Director of Studies in Music at Clare College, Cambridge. In June 2019 it was announced that she would be the 36th Professor of Music at Gresham College. She has authored several books and a number of academic articles.

== Biography ==
Born in Moscow, she first attended the college (ru) of the Moscow Conservatory and then subsequently completed her graduate studies at the conservatory proper. In 1994 she defended her doctorate on the symphonies of the 19th century German composer Robert Schumann and their influence on Russian music. She moved to the United Kingdom in the same year "for personal, rather than political reasons." Between 1994 and 2000 she taught at various universities in the UK, namely at the University of Ulster, Goldsmiths, University of London, and University of Southampton. In 2000 she started teaching at the University of Cambridge.

In her biography, Frolova-Walker writes that she began teaching at 19, and adds that she has given more than 100 lectures before concerts in locations ranging from Carnegie Hall to factories in Kazakhstan.

In 2014, Frolova-Walker was elected as a Fellow of the British Academy, the United Kingdom's national academy for the humanities and social sciences.

In 2015, Frolova-Walker was elected to professorship at the University of Cambridge. She delivered her inaugural professorial lecture at the University of Cambridge in October 2015. Also in 2015 Frolova-Walker was awarded the Dent Medal for outstanding contribution to musicology.

Frolova-Walker has appeared regularly on TV and Radio including the BBC Proms. In 2015 she appeared on BBC Radio 3 Proms Extra speaking on Shostakovich's Leningrad Symphony. She has also contributed to the BBC Radio 3 Stravinsky 'A to Z', BBC Radio 3 Composer of the Week, and BBC Radio 3 Record Review. In 2018-19, Frolova-Walker gave a series of lectures on 'Russian Opera and the State' at Gresham College; in 2019-20 her Gresham lectures will be on Diaghilev and the Ballets Russes. Links to her radio broadcasts, filmed lectures, and selected articles can be found on Frolova-Walker's website.

== Works ==
Frolova-Walker's interest in historiography of Russian music and the nationalist/exoticist myths resulted in the book titled Russian Music and Nationalism: from Glinka to Stalin (2008), which is considered her magnum opus. It has received generally favourable reviews from critics. Andrew Wachtel, although pointing out several errors and shortcomings, wrote that it "will be important for all scholars interested in manifestations of Russian nationalist thinking and/or in the process of cultural nation-building."

In 2011-13 she held a Major Research Fellowship from the Leverhulme Trust, which allowed her to pursue extensive archival research in Russia, leading to the publication of Stalin's Music Prize: Soviet Culture and Politics (Yale University Press, 2016).

Books

- Frolova-Walker, Marina (2008). Russian Music and Nationalism: from Glinka to Stalin. New Haven and London: Yale University Press. ISBN 9780300112733.
- Frolova-Walker, Marina; Walker, Jonathan (2012). Music and Soviet Power, 1917–1932. Woodbridge: Boydell Press. ISBN 978-1843837039.
- Frolova-Walker, Marina (2016). Stalin's Music Prize: Soviet Culture and Politics. New Haven and London: Yale University Press. ISBN 9780300208849.
- Frolova-Walker, Marina and Patrick Zuk (eds.) (2017). Russian Music Since 1917: Reappraisal and Rediscovery. Oxford University Press/British Academy. ISBN 9780197266151
- Frolova-Walker, Marina (ed.) (2018). Rimsky-Korsakov and His World. Princeton, NJ.: Princeton University Press. ISBN 9780691185514.

Selected articles

- ""National in Form, Socialist in Content": Musical Nation-Building in the Soviet Republics'". Journal of the American Musicological Society. 52 (2): 331–371. 1998.
- Frolova-Walker, Marina (2006). "The Soviet Opera Project: Ivan Dzerzhinsky vs. Ivan Susanin". Cambridge Opera Journal. 18 (2). Cambridge University Press: 181–216. doi:10.1017/S0954586706002163. S2CID 190717242.
- Frolova-Walker, Marina (1997). "On Ruslan and Russianess". Cambridge Opera Journal. 9 (1). Cambridge University Press: 21–45. doi:10.1017/S0954586700005140.
- Frolova-Walker, Marina (2004). "Stalin and the Art of Boredom". Twentieth-Century Music. 1 (1): 101–124. doi:10.1017/S1478572204000088. S2CID 194076112.
- Frolova-Walker, Marina (2001). "From Modernism to Socialist Realism in Four Years: Myaskovsky and Asafyev". Muzikologija. 3 (3): 199–217. doi:10.2298/MUZ0303199F.
- "A Ukrainian Tune in Medieval France: Perceptions of Nationalism and Local Color in Russian Nationalism". 19th-Century Music. 35 (2). University of California Press: 115–131. 2011. doi:10.1525/ncm.2011.35.2.115.
- "Opera and Obsolescence in the Russian Culture Wars". Opera Quarterly. 2010. doi:10.1525/ncm.2011.35.2.115.
- "Against Germanic Reasoning: The Search for a Russian Style of Musical Argumentation". Musical Constructions of Nationalism: Essays on the History and Ideology of European Musical Culture, 1800-1945. Cork University Press. 2001.

== Awards and honors ==
- 2015: Dent Medal for Excellence in the field of Musicology
