= Zhdanov Doctrine =

Soviet cultural doctrine by Andrei Zhdanov

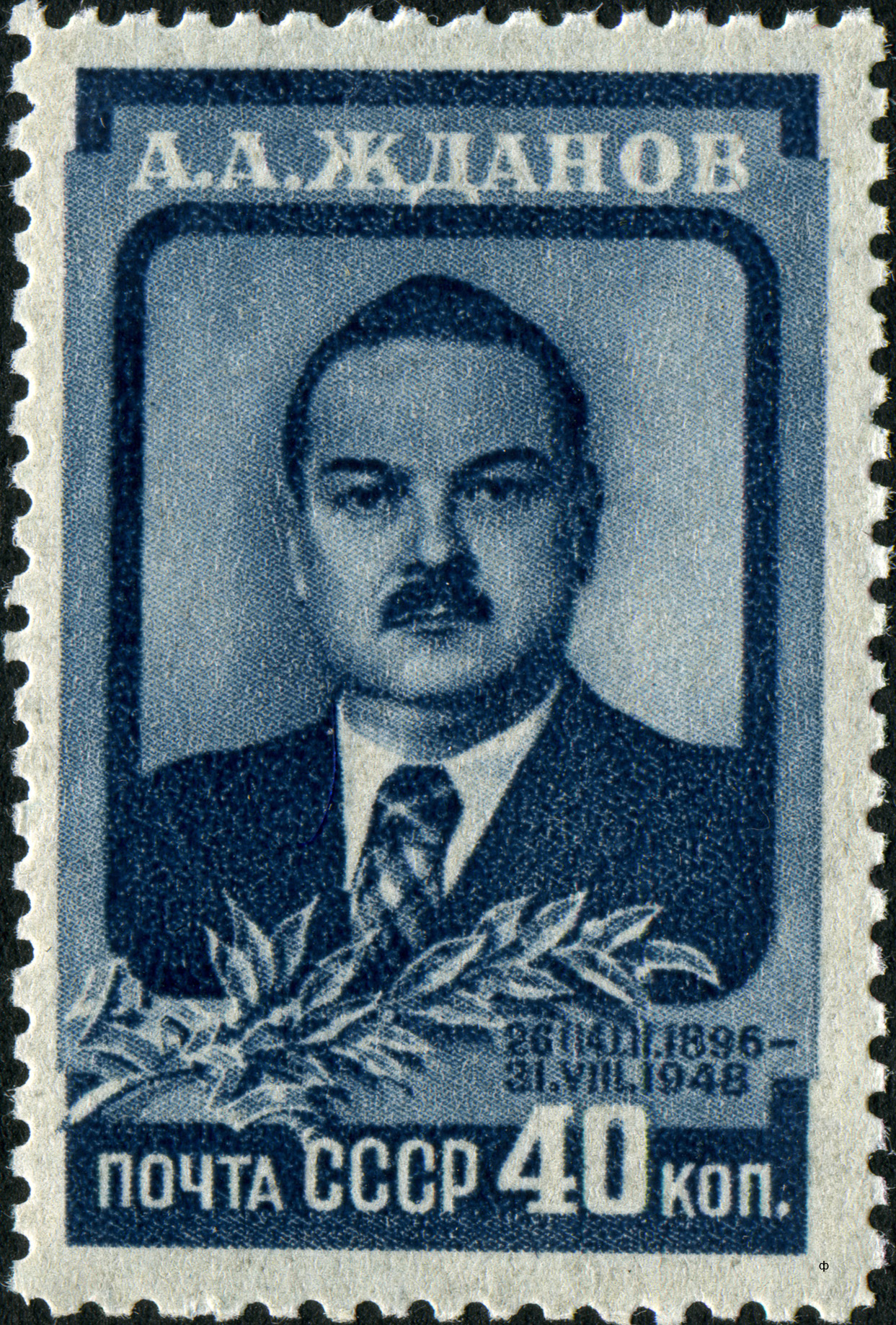
USSR stamp of Andrei Zhdanov.

The Zhdanov Doctrine (also called Zhdanovism or Zhdanovshchina; Russian: доктрина Жданова, ждановизм, ждановщина) was a Soviet cultural doctrine developed by Central Committee secretary Andrei Zhdanov in 1946. The main principle of the Zhdanov Doctrine was a strict interpretation of Socialist Realism and a focus upon positive artistic works that exalted the proletariat, and its role in socialist construction. Zhdanovism soon became a Soviet cultural policy, meaning that Soviet artists, writers, and intelligentsia with few exceptions had to clearly conform to the party line in their creative works. Under this policy, artists who failed to comply with the government's wishes risked public scorn and harm to their career. The policy remained in effect until the death of Joseph Stalin in 1953.

== History ==
The 1946 resolution of the Central Committee was directed against two literary magazines, Zvezda and Leningrad, which had published supposedly apolitical, "bourgeois", individualistic works of the satirist Mikhail Zoshchenko and the poet Anna Akhmatova. Part of Zhdanovism was a campaign against "cosmopolitanism", which meant that foreign models were not to be unthinkingly emulated, and native Russian accomplishments were emphasized.

A further decree on music was issued on 20 February 1948, "On Muradeli's Opera The Great Friendship" and marked the beginning of the so-called "anti-formalism campaign". (The term "formalism" referred to art for art's sake which did not serve a larger social purpose.) Nominally aimed at Vano Muradeli's opera The Great Friendship, it signaled a sustained campaign of criticism and persecution against many of the Soviet Union's foremost composers, notably Dmitri Shostakovich, Sergei Prokofiev, Aram Khachaturian and Dmitri Klebanov for allegedly writing "hermetic" music and misusing dissonance. The decree was followed in April by a special congress of the Composers' Union, where many of those attacked were forced publicly to repent. The campaign was satirized in the Antiformalist Rayok by Shostakovich. The composers condemned were formally rehabilitated by a further decree issued on 28 May 1958.

In Wrocław, a congress met in mid-1948. Accompanying Soviet consolidation of power in Eastern Europe, Zhdanov's chosen man Fadeyev, president of the Soviet writer's union, made a speech establishing the base for socialist realism outside of the Soviet Union. This targeted three main groups – Soviet-leaning Western intellectuals that Zhdanov hoped would be brought around to Zhdanovism instead of just preaching peace, sympathetic non-Communist artists and intellectuals in liberal democracies, and artists and intellectuals in Eastern Europe and Soviet-occupied Germany who were to be forced to accept the tenets of Zhdanovism and socialist realism. This led to ripples in the West that led to more sympathies and pacifism in the West and benefited the Socialist Unity Party of Germany (SED) in later East Germany.

== See also ==
- Anti-cosmopolitan campaign

== Bibliography ==
- Braudel, Fernand, 1993. A History of Civilizations, translated by Richard Mayne. New York: A. Lane, 1993. ISBN 9780713990225. Reprinted New York: Penguin Books, 1994. ISBN 978-0-140-12489-7; ISBN 978-0-713-99022-5 (pbk).
- Green, Jonathan, and Nicholas J. Karolides. 2005. The Encyclopedia of Censorship, rev. ed. New York: Facts On File. ISBN 978-0816044641.
- Taruskin, Richard, 2010. Music in the Late Twentieth Century. Oxford: Oxford University Press. ISBN 978-0-19-538485-7.
- Solomon, Maynard, ed. (1979). Marxism and Art: Essays Classic and Contemporary. Detroit: Wayne State University Press. ISBN 0-8143-1620-4. OCLC 4831801.
