= Vano Muradeli =

Soviet Georgian composer (1908–1970)

Vano Muradeli

Vano Muradeli (Georgian: ვანო მურადელი; Russian: Вано Ильич Мурадели; 6 April [O.S. 24 March] 1908 – 14 August 1970), was a Soviet Georgian composer.

== Biography ==
He was born in Gori, Georgia (then part of Imperial Russia) to Georgian -Armenian parents. He graduated from Tbilisi State Conservatoire in 1931; then studied with Nikolai Myaskovsky at the Moscow Conservatory. From 1934 to 1938, he worked there. From 1942 to 1944, he served as a principal and artistic director of the Central Ensemble of the Soviet Navy. In 1946, he was awarded the Stalin Prize. In 1948, his opera The Great Friendship was censured by the resolution of the Communist Party Central Committee. After Joseph Stalin's death, he was restored to favor and granted the title of the People's Artist of the USSR in 1968.

== Works ==
Opera:

- "The Great Friendship" (1947; premiere, Moscow, 7 November 1947)
- "October" (1950; revised 1962; premiere, Moscow, 22 April 1964)

Operetta:

- "Moscow-Paris-Moscow" (1968)

Orchestra:

- Symphony No. 1 "To the Memory of Kirov" (1938; premiere Moscow, 28 November 1938)
- Symphony No. 2 (1945; received Stalin Prize)
- Georgian Dance Suite for symphony orchestra (1939)
- Festive Overture for symphony orchestra (1940)
- Symphonic poem, "The Path of Victory" for chorus and orchestra (1950)

Vocal with orchestra:

- Cantata: "Our Leader" (for the 60th birthday of Stalin, 1939)
- Cantata: "Together for Ever" (1959)
- Cantata: "Lenin is Among Us" (1960)
- Song on the Youth of Stalin for solo-voice and orchestra (1940)
- "Zdravitza" for mixed chorus and orchestra (1941)
- March for mixed chorus and wind orchestra (1941)

"Бухенвальдский набат" на стихи Александра Соболева 1968г

One of his compositions, My dear land, my Kabardia (Note: Russian: Край мой родной, моя Кабарда; Kabardian: Си хэку лъапӏэ, си Къэбэрдей) is now used as the anthem of the city of Nalchik since 2014.
